= Himeanole (film) =

2016 Japanese film by Keisuke Yoshida

- Directed by: Keisuke Yoshida
- Written by: Minoru Furuya (original story); Keisuke Yoshida (screenplay)
- Starring: Go Morita; Gaku Hamada
- Cinematography: Takayuki Shida
- Edited by: Shinichi Suzuki
- Music by: Takashi Nomura
- Production companies: Django Film; Happinet; J Storm
- Distributed by: Nikkatsu
- Release dates: 25 April 2016 (Udine); 28 May 2016 (Japan)
- Running time: 99 minutes
- Country: Japan
- Language: Japanese

Hime-anole (ヒメアノ～ル, Hime-anōru) (Note: The title ヒメアノ～ル (Hime-anōru) has been variously rendered as Hime-Anole, Hime-anole, Hime Anole, and Himeanole in its international festival screenings and subsequent reviews. The compound is pronounced as two words Hīmè and Anōle.) is a 2016 Japanese romantic thriller black comedy film directed by Keisuke Yoshida. It is based on the manga series of the same name written by Minoru Furuya, serialized in the Weekly Young Magazine between 2008 and 2010, and republished into six volumes. The film received an R-15 rating in Japan. It is the second of Furuya's works to be adapted to the big screen, following 2011's Himizu.

The film marks the debut of V6 boyband singer Go Morita in his first starring role in a feature film as the antagonist Soichi Morita, and stars Gaku Hamada as the naive protagonist Okada among a cast of odd characters entrenched amid love triangles and shoddy friendships. It premiered at the Far East Film Festival in Udine, Italy on 25 April 2016, and was released theatrically on 28 May in Japan.

== Plot ==
Ando works at a cleaning company where he is tasked in charge of clumsy newcomer Okada. While Ando struggles to remember his name, referring to him as "Okamura", the two slowly develop a friendship. Okada, who loathes himself for leading a useless and aimless life, mentions to Ando how he is dissatisfied for having no hobbies, girlfriend, leading a repetitive life and wasting away. Ando comforts him stating no one is satisfied, and dissatisfaction is the driving force behind life. When asked if he feels the same way, Ando replies with a blunt no, stating "I live each day for love."

Okada joins Ando at a nearby café to meet his "girlfriend", which turns out to be the waitress Yuka he has a crush on but never confessed to. Ando then notices "the blond dude" sitting outside, who he thinks has his eyes set on his beloved Yuka. Okada glances and remembers him as Morita, a highschool classmate. Ando tells Okada to talk to him, in case he has ill intent towards Yuka. Okada approaches Morita, who denies ever having come here before, and the two exchange phone numbers. As Ando and Okada leave the café, he asks Okada to investigate. Okada hesitates but agrees to talk to Yuka. Okada waits outside the café in the evening for Yuka to finish her shift. The nervous Yuka mentions she fears she is being stalked, including receiving harassing phone calls and her mail disappearing. The next day at work, Ando tells Okada the pair shall go to the café everyday to ensure Yuka's well-being. Okada hands her their numbers, and later Ando rambles to Okada about wanting to take Yuka on a date.

Morita, a habitual smoker and pachinko player, makes a phone call to Wagusa at his workplace demanding $5000. The nervous Wagusa meets his girlfriend Kumiko, a coworker, to help him steal the money from his father's business where the two work. She eventually demands to know why he keeps giving him money. Wagusa reveals the two were classmates bullied by the same kids throughout highschool. A week before graduation, Morita visited Wagusa at night to tell him "I caught Kawashima," to enact revenge for his years of torment. Morita tells Wagusa to beat him with a bat, before Morita kills him and buries his body. Since the incident, Wagusa notes something changed in Morita who began extorting him for money.

During an awkward double date between Ando, Okada, Yuka and her friend Ai, the outspoken Ai tells Ando he has no chance with Yuka. The two have been friends since kindergarten and she can tell Yuka loves someone else. Ando urges Okada to determine whether Yuka would date Ando, so Okada waits outside the next day to talk to her but Yuka maintains she likes someone else. She reveals the person she likes is actually him. The nervous Okada wonders if it is a prank and stares around for hidden cameras. Instead, he notices Ando hiding at a corner who overhears everything; Ando collapses before letting out an unending scream. Yuka panics and begins screaming herself, before the two run away in opposite directions.

Okada and Yuka meet again in private after Ando had been absent from work for a week. The two talk before Yuka convinces him they should date. Before long, the seemingly shy Yuka turns out to be very sexual. Awkwardness ensues when the inexperienced Okada prods her with questions about her partner count and when she lost her virginity. Morita, who has been stalking Yuka outside her house, notices the two having sex and decides to call Wagusa to help him kill Okada. Kumiko convinces Wagusa they should kill Morita instead. This leads to a string of events involving Morita which sees several people dead, and Okada and Yuka's lives in increasing danger.

== Cast ==
- Go Morita as Shōichi Morita
- Gaku Hamada as Susumu Okada
- Aimi Satsukawa as Yuka Abe
- Tsuyoshi Muro as Yūji Andō
- Ryusuke Komakine as Wagusa Kōsuke
- Maho Yamada as Kumiko, girlfriend of Wagusa
- Isamu Nobue as Ai Iida, best friend of Yuka
- Eishin Hayashida as Kawashima, the school bully
- Satoshi Yamanaka as the neighbor of Yuka
- Makoto Otake as the cleaning company boss

== Release ==
The film had its world premiere at the Far East Film Festival in Udine, Italy on 25 April 2016, and its North American premiere at the San Diego Asian Film Festival on 7 November in San Diego, California. It was released theatrically in Japan on 28 May 2010, and in Taiwan on 30 September.

== Reception ==
=== Critical response ===
Himeanole received largely positive reviews. Japanese critic Hinataka of CinemasPlus praised the manner in which the film was adapted and condensed from the manga: "it was constructed so skillfully that it could be said to be perfect." Panos Kotzathanasis of AsianMoviePulse commended the effortless genre-blending: "Beginning as a comedy-drama ... Continuing as a violent thriller ... Yoshida manages to merge two films into one ... This transition between the two parts is portrayed through an intricate and very impressive scene. As Susumu and Yuka have sex, Morita tortures and kills a woman, with the setting switching a number of times and the moves of each "couple" mirror each other in the most unsettling fashion. The scene exemplifies the direction, the camera work, the editing, the sound, and the special effects of the film." Spanish critic Omar Parra of TerrorWeekend rated it 4.5/5, describing the film "as American Pie meets I Saw the Devil, the premise is inconceivable but I think the director has managed to blend both genres to perfection."

James Mudge of EasternKicks rated it 5/5 and praised the cast's performances, singling out Morita "who does an amazing job of distancing himself from his former boy band image as the unstable Morita, expressing a wide range of psychological states and emotions." In a follow-up piece, Mudge lamented that since its world premiere the film "hasn't been seen as widely as it should" adding that most East Asian films released that year were "generic and unadventurous" while Himeanole was "a brutal punch to the gut" and memorable. Harris Dang of VCinemaShow praised the chemistry between Hamada and Muro, adding that the "production values are great, especially the music score and the editing. The cinematography is also interesting as shots start off static and gradually become more hand-held when the depravity sets in. The film is also refreshingly free of CGI."

Mark Schilling of The Japan Times rated it 4/5, praising Morita's acting, and spoke of "the film's central theme: Human beings are capable of both good and evil, and crossing the line from the former to the latter can be more a matter of fate than choice ... And Okada's sin? Silence, in the name of survival." Andrew Mack of Screen Anarchy praised the film for its anti-bullying message: "While a lot of western films want to show or capture the shattering effects of bullying at the teen level, few have ever ventured into adulthood like Himeanole has to show how long lasting those effects are." Italian critic Massimo Volpe of LinkInMovies rated the film 3.5/5, describing it as "among the best seen at this year's Far East Film Festival" and that "the figure of Morita arouses some compassionate gaze, if not solidarity" following his "chronic bullying suffered at school of which Okada was a guilty Pilatian observer."

French critic Fabrice Sayag of LesChroniquesDeCliffhanger, in his review of its screening at the L'Étrange Festival, criticized the romantic comedy element and found the flashbacks expounding upon Morita's violent impulses as not well-integrated and sometimes "useless." He admonished the director's foray into the genre, stating that Yoshida "is not at ease in these violent scenes, staged without inventiveness," and rated the film 2/5. French critic Pascal Voglimacci of JournalDuJapon stated that "[Morita's] outbursts of violence are anything but gratuitous. They reflect the psychological wandering of the character of Morita, almost always absent, like an undead drifting in limbo." He lauded the film's balancing act, its special effects, and the characters "[proving] much more complex than they appeared in the first scenes" as constituting the successes of the film.

=== Year-end lists ===
EasternKicks ranked the film at #6 on its list of the "Top 10 Films of 2016" in December 2016. TasteOfCinema ranked the film at #2 on its list of "The 10 Best Japanese Films of 2016" in December 2016, and at #4 on its list of "The 25 Best Japanese Movies of The 2010s (So Far)" in August 2017.

AsianMoviePulse included the film as part of its list of "The 20 Best Asian Films of 2016" in January 2017, and ranked the film at #22 on its list of "The 60 Best Asian Films of the Decade (2011-2020)" in January 2021, at #10 on its list of "The 40 Best Japanese Movies of the Decade (2011-2020)" in February 2021, and at #17 of its list of "20 Great Contemporary Japanese Crime Movies" in April 2021.

=== Accolades ===
Award	Date of ceremony	Category	Nominee	Result	Ref.
41st Hochi Film Awards	29 November 2016 (Note: The nominations for the jury awards and the results of the Readers' Choice awards were announced on 14 November 2016. The winners of the jury awards were announced on 29 November, and the formal ceremony was held on 20 December 2016.)	Best Picture	Himeanole	Nominated	
41st Hochi Film Awards	29 November 2016	Best Picture – Readers' Choice	Himeanole	Won	
41st Hochi Film Awards	29 November 2016	Best Actor	Go Morita	Nominated	
41st Hochi Film Awards	29 November 2016	Best Actor – Readers' Choice	Go Morita	Won	
5th Japan Action Awards	18 March 2017	Best Action Picture	Himeanole	Nominated	
5th Japan Action Awards	18 March 2017	Best Action Scene	"Window-breaking stunt scene with two people"	Nominated	
5th Japan Action Awards	18 March 2017	Best Stuntman	Daisuke Hibari; Yukihiro Sakate	Nominated	
7th Video Shop Awards	24 March 2017	Grand Prix	Himeanole	Won	
