= Tsuwamonogatari =

Japanese manga series

- First tankōbon volume cover, featuring Souji Okita

ツワモノガタリ (Tsuwamonogatari)
- Genre: Chanbara; Historical
- Manga
- Written by: Tadataka Hosokawa
- Published by: Kodansha
- Imprint: Young Magazine KC
- Magazine: Weekly Young Magazine (2021–2022); YanMaga Web (2022–2023)
- Original run: November 29, 2021 – June 3, 2023
- Volumes: 8

Tsuwamonogatari (ツワモノガタリ) (Note: The title is a blend of tsuwamono (兵; "strong warrior") and monogatari (物語; "story").) is a Japanese manga series written and illustrated by Tadataka Hosokawa. It started in Kodansha's seinen manga magazine Weekly Young Magazine in November 2021. It finished in the magazine in November 2022; it was transferred to the YanMaga Web website and app in that same day, and finished in June 2023. Its chapters have been collected in eight tankōbon as of September 2023.

== Premise ==
The story takes place in 1864 at the end of the Edo period, one evening at the Shinsengumi camp the members of the Shinsengumi were having a lively drink, In an atmosphere of swordsmanship that could easily lead to a serious sword fight if alcohol were involved, Kondo proposed to Zao a discussion about who is the strongest swordsman in the country. when it was time to talk about the strongest opponent the Shinsengumi had ever defeated, it was Okita, who had arrived late, started the conversation and the name he mentioned was Kazu.

== Characters ==
Souji Okita (沖田 (総司), Souji Okita)
Assistant to the Shinsengumi Vice-Chief. Tennen Rishin style. He respects Isamu Kondo as his teacher.
Isamu Kondo (近藤 (勇), Isamu Kondo)
Director of Shinsengumi. Fourth generation head of Tennen Rishin-ryu. He proposes that he gather his friends and talk about who is the strongest assassin.
Toshizo Hijikata (土方 (歳三), Toshizo Hijikata)
Deputy leader of the Shinsengumi. Tennen Rishin style. Although he was born as a peasant, he became a samurai through his own talent. He will face off against Sakamoto, who has completely opposite ideas.
Ryoma Sakamoto (坂本 (龍馬), Ryoma Sakamoto)
Born in Tosa. Although he was born as a samurai, he abandoned his status as a samurai and worked hard to bring Japan closer to a modern nation. He confronts Hijikata, who lives the exact opposite way.
Yamanami Keisuke (山南 (敬助), Yamanami Keisuke)
Deputy leader of the Shinsengumi. Hokushin Itto-ryu. he was present when Okita and Serizawa fought each other and witnessed their strength.
Kamo Serizawa (芹沢 (鴨), Kamo Serizawa)
The first head of the Shinsengumi. He is Shinto Munen-ryu. Due to his domineering and careless behavior, the Shinsengumi's reputation deteriorated, leading to him being assassinated and clashing with Okita.
Heisuke Todo (藤堂 (平助), Heisuke Todo)
Shinsengumi's Kirikomi captain and later the head of the 8th division. He became fascinated with Hokushin Itto-ryu, a practical style of swordsmanship, and became his student. He talks a lot, but he doesn't hesitate to cut people down.
Hanpeita Takeichi (武市 (半平太), Hanpeita Takeichi)
Leader of the Tosa Kinnoto Party. One sword style. He is a popular and politically skilled person, and the only person who understands Shinbei Tanaka, who does not show his emotions. I could tell that he was hiding something hot.
Sanosuke Harada (原田 (佐之助), Sanosuke Harada)
Shinsengumi's strongest spear wielder. He learned the Taneda-ryu spear technique from Sanjuro Tani (later the head of Shinsengumi's 7th division), and then entered the Hozoin-ryu. Therefore, he called himself the Taneda Hozoin school.
Shinsaku Takasugi (高杉 (晋作), Shinsaku Takasugi)
He is Shoin Yoshida's best disciple and one of the Four Heavenly Kings of Matsushita Sonjuku. He founded the Kiheitai in the Choshu domain. The most charismatic person from the end of the Edo period, who has the ability to pass the Yagyu Shinkage-ryu license.

== Publication ==
Written and illustrated by Tadataka Hosokawa, Tsuwamonogatari started in Kodansha's seinen manga magazine Weekly Young Magazine on November 29, 2021. It finished in the magazine on November 21, 2022, and moved to the YanMaga Web website and app in that same day. It finished on June 3, 2023. Kodansha has collected its chapters into individual tankōbon volumes. The first volume was released on May 6, 2022. As of September 20, 2023, eight volumes have been released.

In France, the manga is licensed by Pika.

=== Volumes ===
No.	Release date	ISBN
1	May 6, 2022	978-4-06-527021-9
2	July 6, 2022	978-4-06-528419-3
3	September 20, 2022	978-4-06-529069-9
4	November 4, 2022	978-4-06-529809-1
5	January 19, 2023	978-4-06-530420-4
6	April 20, 2023	978-4-06-531385-5
7	June 20, 2023	978-4-06-532057-0
8	September 20, 2023	978-4-06-533036-4

== Reception ==
The series was recommended and acclaimed by the critic Mei Chan of Real Sound, she praised the extensive research that has been done in the sword fighting scenes, described Hosokawa's manga as "an advanced shinsengumi manga that interprets the swordsmen of the late Edo period not in terms of friendship or youth, but in terms of their strength", and she said that "the research and understanding that is the foundation of swordsmanship power is accurately depicted", she also praised the duel in the first volume, which took place between two men centered on "sword fighting", and called the scenes "amazing".

== See also ==
- Shinsengumi
