= Yanwari Kazama =

Japanese manga artist

- Born: birth name not made public June 13, 1977 Itabashi, Tokyo
- Died: October 22, 2013 (aged 36) Tokyo
- Area: yonkoma
- Notable works: Taberemasen, Pochi kyokudō

Yanwari Kazama (風間やんわり, Kazama Yanwari; June 13, 1977 – October 22, 2013) was a Japanese manga artist.

He started drawing the Taberemasen ("not fit for consumption") yonkoma cartoon in 1995 in the Kodansha-published Young Magazine while still in high school, and continued the series until 2013. Besides publishing in Young Magazine, he also published social satire cartoons in the weekly magazine Friday.

He died on October 22, 2013, from liver failure.
