= Heisei Haizanhei Sumire-chan =

Japanese manga series

- First tankōbon volume cover

平成敗残兵☆すみれちゃん
- Manga
- Written by: Satomi U
- Published by: Kodansha
- Imprint: Young Magazine KC Special
- Magazine: Weekly Young Magazine
- Original run: January 22, 2024 – present
- Volumes: 11
- icon

Heisei Haizanhei Sumire-chan (平成敗残兵☆すみれちゃん; 'The Defeated Straggler of the Heisei Era, Sumire-chan') is a Japanese manga series written and illustrated by Satomi U. It was originally published as a one-shot in March 2023, before beginning serialization in Kodansha's Weekly Young Magazine in January 2024. The series has been compiled into eleven volumes as of August 2026.

== Plot ==
The series follows Sumire Tōjō, a 31-year-old former idol who lives alone after leaving the entertainment industry. When her cousin Yūsei encourages her to become a doujin idol and sell a self-published photobook, she is initially hesitant. However, she decides to go along with his plan given how financially lucrative it could be.

== Characters ==
Sumire Tōjō (東条 すみれ, Tōjō Sumire)
Voiced by: Yōko Hikasa (PV)
The title character. She is a 31-year-old former idol who lives alone in a run-down apartment. She was previously the gravure leader of the group First Lovers, but left the industry due to the group's lack of success. She is an alcoholic and a heavy smoker who stays at home apart from working part-time at a snack bar. Because of her low income, her aunt Mika, who is Yūsei's mother, pays for her living expenses. She travels around on an old scooter.
Yūsei Izumi (泉 雄星, Izumi Yūsei)
Voiced by: Chiaki Kobayashi (PV)
A high school student and Sumire's cousin. He is aware of Sumire's past and even search for her old goods, believing her idol career's failure happened due to mismanagement rather than any fault of her own. He encourages her to become a doujin idol in order to earn more money.
Ayumi Maeda (前田 安祐美, Maeda Ayumi)
A former member of Sumire's idol group.
Sōko Mitarai (御手洗 颯子, Mitarai Sōko)
Voiced by: Hiromi Igarashi (PV)
A former member of Sumire's idol group. After the group's disbandment, she became a doujin manga artist under the pen name Sushi Karma (すしカルマ, Sushi Karuma).
Ninzaburō Femme Fatale (ファムファタ任三郎, Famufata Ninzaburō)
A cosplayer and gravure model who is the representative director and founder of Femme Fatale Production. She offers to work with Sumire.
Mika (ミカ)
Yūsei's mother and the mama of the snack bar where Sumire works part-time.

== Publication ==
Heisei Haizanhei Sumire-chan is written and illustrated by Satomi U. It was originally published as a one-shot in March 2023, before beginning serialization in Kodansha's Weekly Young Magazine in January 2024. The series has been compiled into eleven tankōbon volumes as of August 2026. A promotional video featuring Hiromi Igarashi voicing the character Sushi Karma was released in December 2024 to promote the fourth volume. A collaboration manga chapter with the manga series Noa-senpai wa Tomodachi was released that same month.

No.	Release date	ISBN
1	May 7, 2024	978-4-06-535215-1
2	August 6, 2024	978-4-06-536540-3
3	October 4, 2024	978-4-06-537269-2
4	December 6, 2024	978-4-06-537902-8
5	March 6, 2025	978-4-06-538915-7
6	June 6, 2025	978-4-06-539949-1
7	September 5, 2025	978-4-06-540849-0
8	December 5, 2025	978-4-06-541758-4
9	March 6, 2026	978-4-06-542881-8
10	May 20, 2026	978-4-06-543543-4
11	August 6, 2026	978-4-06-544231-9

== Reception ==
The series was nominated for the 11th Next Manga Awards in the print category in 2025, and was ranked fifth. The series has been nominated for the 50th Kodansha Manga Award in 2025 in the general category.

== See also ==
- Beauty and the Feast, another manga series by the same author
