= Minoru Furuya =

Japanese manga artist

Minoru Furuya 古谷 実
- Born: March 28, 1972 (age 54)
- Area: Manga artist
- Notable works: The Ping Pong Club

Minoru Furuya (古谷 実, Furuya Minoru; born March 28, 1972) is a Japanese manga artist from Saitama Prefecture.

His debut work is The Ping Pong Club, published in Young Magazine. It was adapted into a 26-episode anime series in 1995. In 1996, he won the Kodansha Manga Award for The Ping Pong Club. In March 2021, Kodansha USA licensed Ciguatera.

Two of his series have been adapted to the big screen, namely Himizu in 2011, and Himeanole in 2016.

== Works ==
Title	Year	Notes	Refs
The Ping Pong Club	1993–1996	Serialized in Weekly Young Magazine; Published by Kodansha in 13 volumes	
The Same as Me (僕といっしょ, Boku to Issho)	1997–1998	Serialized in Weekly Young Magazine; Published by Kodansha in 5 volumes	
Green Hill (グリーンヒル, Gurinhru)	1999–2000	Serialized in Weekly Young Magazine; Published by Kodansha in 3 volumes	
Himizu (ヒミズ)	2001–2002	Serialized in Weekly Young Magazine; Published by Kodansha in 4 volumes	
Ciguatera (シガテラ, Shigatera)	2003–2005	Serialized in Weekly Young Magazine; Published by Kodansha in 6 volumes	
Wanitokagegisu (わにとかげぎす)	2006–2007	Serialized in Weekly Young Magazine; Published by Kodansha in 4 volumes	
Himeanole (ヒメアノ～ル, Himeanoru)	2008–2010	Serialized in Weekly Young Magazine; Published by Kodansha in 6 volumes	
Saltiness (サルチネス, Saruchinesu)	2012–2013	Serialized in Weekly Young Magazine; Published by Kodansha in 4 volumes	
Gereksiz (ゲレクシス, Gerekushisu)	2016–2017	Serialized in Evening; Published by Kodansha in 2 volumes	
