= Gereksiz =

Japanese manga series

- First tankōbon volume cover

ゲレクシス (Gerekushisu)
- Genre: Black comedy; Fantasy
- Manga
- Written by: Minoru Furuya
- Published by: Kodansha
- Magazine: Evening
- Original run: April 12, 2016 – February 14, 2017
- Volumes: 2
- icon

Gereksiz (Japanese: ゲレクシス, Hepburn: Gerekushisu) is a Japanese manga series written and illustrated by Minoru Furuya. It was serialized in Kodansha's seinen manga magazine Evening from April 2016 to February 2017, with its chapters collected in two tankōbon volumes.

== Publication ==
Written and illustrated by Minoru Furuya, Gereksiz was serialized in Kodansha's seinen manga magazine Evening from April 12, 2016, to February 14, 2017. Kodansha collected its chapters in two tankōbon volumes, released on September 23, 2016, and March 23, 2017.

=== Volumes ===
No.	Release date	ISBN
1	September 23, 2016	978-4-06-354637-8
2	March 23, 2017	978-4-06-354662-0
