= Me and the Prez, Drinking Under the Stars =

Japanese manga series

- First tankōbon volume cover

社長と酒と星 (Shachō to Sake to Hoshi)
- Genre: Romantic comedy
- Manga
- Written by: Zurikishi
- Published by: Kodansha
- English publisher: NA: Seven Seas Entertainment
- Imprint: Young Magazine KC
- Magazine: Weekly Young Magazine
- Original run: May 12, 2025 – present
- Volumes: 9

Me and the Prez, Drinking Under the Stars (Japanese: 社長と酒と星, Hepburn: Shachō to Sake to Hoshi) is a Japanese manga series written and illustrated by Zurikishi. It began serialization in Kodansha's Weekly Young Magazine in May 2025, and has been compiled into nine volumes of October 2026.

== Plot ==
Kenichi Ishizumi, a 37-year-old salaryman working at Izutsu Printing, is working under Reina Izutsu, the company's current president. She recently came to the position following the death of her father. However, despite showing a strong personality at work, she is actually finding it difficult to cope with her responsibilities. One night, Kenichi encounters Reina sobbing and drinking at a park, with Reina mistaking him for an old classmate and wanting to quit her job. Feeling sorry about her, he vows to support her work and cheer her up.

== Characters ==
Kenichi Ishizumi (石墨 憲一, Ishizumi Kenichi)
A 37-year-old section chief at Izutsu Printing. He encounters Reina at a park one night and cheers her up when she was upset over her responsibilities at the company. Knowing her situation, he decides to help her becoming more confident about her role, while also supporting her job. He often encounters her at the park at night. As time goes on he develops feelings for her.
Reina Izutsu (井筒 玲奈, Izutsu Reina)
The 24-year-old president of Izutsu Printing, who succeeded her father after his sudden death. Due to the nature of her succession, she felt unprepared for the job, leading her to act harsh towards her colleagues. However, this is actually a façade, as she feels intense pressure to perform. Due to this, she is fond of drinking alcohol. During her times drinking at the park, she becomes so drunk that she does not recognize Ishizumi.

== Publication ==
The series is written and illustrated by Zurikishi, who began serializing it in Kodansha's Weekly Young Magazine on May 12, 2025. The first tankōbon volume was released on August 6, 2025; the first volume included a recommendation by voice actress Yoko Hikasa, who was also interviewed in Weekly Young Magazine to coincide with the volume's release. Nine volumes have been released as of October 6, 2026. The series is licensed in English by Seven Seas Entertainment, which will release its first volume in November 2026.

No.	Original release date	Original ISBN	North American release date	North American ISBN
1	August 6, 2025	978-4-06-540226-9	November 10, 2026	979-8-89863-474-2
2	October 6, 2025	978-4-06-541161-2	March 9, 2027	979-8-89863-512-1
3	December 5, 2025	978-4-06-541767-6	—	—
4	February 6, 2026	978-4-06-542551-0	—	—
5	April 6, 2026	978-4-06-543193-1	—	—
6	June 5, 2026	978-4-06-543816-9	—	—
7	July 6, 2026	978-4-06-544245-6	—	—
8	August 6, 2026	978-4-06-544571-6	—	—
9	October 6, 2026	978-4-06-545209-7	—	—

== Reception ==
The series was ranked tenth in the print category at the twelfth Next Manga Award in 2026.
