= Hen na Chishiki ni Kuwashii Kanojo Takayukashiki Sōko-san =

Japanese manga series

- First tankōbon volume cover

変な知識に詳しい彼女 高床式草子さん
- Genre: Romantic comedy
- Manga
- Written by: Ohana-chan
- Published by: Kodansha
- Magazine: Weekly Young Magazine
- Original run: January 22, 2018 – March 9, 2020
- Volumes: 5
- icon

Hen na Chishiki ni Kuwashii Kanojo Takayukashiki Sōko-san (変な知識に詳しい彼女 高床式草子さん) is a Japanese manga series written and illustrated by Ohana-chan. It was serialized in Kodansha's seinen manga magazine Weekly Young Magazine from January 2018 to March 2020.

== Publication ==
Written and illustrated by Ohana-chan, Hen na Chishiki ni Kuwashii Kanojo Takayukashiki Sōko-san was serialized in Kodansha's seinen manga magazine Weekly Young Magazine from January 22, 2018, to March 9, 2020. Kodansha collected its chapters in five tankōbon volumes, released from September 6, 2018, to May 7, 2020.

=== Volumes ===
No.	Japanese release date	Japanese ISBN
1	September 6, 2018	978-4-06-512824-4
2	February 6, 2019	978-4-06-514510-4
3	June 6, 2019	978-4-06-515743-5
4	November 6, 2019	978-4-06-517732-7
5	May 7, 2020	978-4-06-519552-9
