= Myō-chan Sensei wa Kaku Katariki =

Japanese manga series

- First tankōbon volume cover

みょーちゃん先生はかく語りき
- Genre: Erotic comedy
- Manga
- Written by: Tokusaku Kanari
- Illustrated by: Soda Muteki
- Published by: Kodansha
- Imprint: Young Magazine KC
- Magazine: Weekly Young Magazine
- Original run: February 13, 2023 – October 27, 2025
- Volumes: 12
- icon

Myō-chan Sensei wa Kaku Katariki (Japanese: みょーちゃん先生はかく語りき; lit. 'Thus Spoke Myō-chan-sensei') is a Japanese manga series written by Tokusaku Kanari and illustrated by Soda Muteki. It was serialized in Kodansha's Weekly Young Magazine from February 2023 to October 2025, and was compiled into twelve tankōbon volumes.

== Plot ==
The series follows Miyoka Sasafune, also known as Myō-chan, a nurse who works at a high school. Because of her position, many students come to her for advice, including about love. However, students often ask about sex lives, much to her astonishment. Despite her confusion and surprise regarding their questions, she does her best to answer them, hoping to be as helpful as possible.

== Characters ==
Miyoka Sasafune (笹舟 みよか, Sasafune Miyoka)
A 24-year-old school nurse who gives love advice to students. She is well-liked by students, who have nicknamed her Myō-chan (みょーちゃん). She is married.
Renami Yoshiki (吉木 れなみ, Yoshiki Renami)
Miyoka's colleague and a teacher at their school. They often go out together for drinks.
Ikori Kashi (樫 いこり, Kashi Ikori)
An art teacher known for her mysterious personality.

== Publication ==
The series is written by Tokusaku Kanari and illustrated by Soda Muteki. It was serialized in Kodansha's Weekly Young Magazine from February 13, 2023, to October 27, 2025. The first tankōbon volume was released on June 6, 2023, and the twelfth and last volume was released on February 6, 2026. The series has had collaborations with the manga series Medaka Kuroiwa Is Impervious to My Charms and Even the Student Council Has Its Holes!.

No.	Release date	ISBN
1	June 6, 2023	978-4-06-531758-7
2	September 6, 2023	978-4-06-533009-8
3	December 6, 2023	978-4-06-533991-6
4	March 6, 2024	978-4-06-535064-5
5	June 6, 2024	978-4-06-535821-4
6	September 5, 2024	978-4-06-536882-4
7	November 6, 2024	978-4-06-537596-9
8	February 6, 2025	978-4-06-538460-2
9	June 6, 2025	978-4-06-539619-3
10	August 6, 2025	978-4-06-540531-4
11	November 6, 2025	978-4-06-541403-3
12	February 6, 2026	978-4-06-542529-9
