= Beauty and the Feast =

Japanese manga series

- First tankōbon volume cover

八雲さんは餌づけがしたい (Yakumo-san wa Eduke ga Shitai)
- Genre: Romantic comedy; Slice of life
- Manga
- Written by: Satomi U
- Published by: Square Enix
- English publisher: NA: Square Enix
- Magazine: Young Gangan
- Original run: March 4, 2016 – March 19, 2021
- Volumes: 11

Beauty and the Feast (Japanese: 八雲さんは餌づけがしたい, Hepburn: Yakumo-san wa Eduke ga Shitai) is a Japanese manga series written and illustrated by Satomi U. It was serialized in Square Enix's Young Gangan from March 2016 to March 2021, and published in eleven volumes.

== Plot ==
28-year-old Shuuko Yakumo is aimlessly living day-to-day life since she lost her husband. She's content to live out her days in peace until a 15-year-old high school student named Shohei Yamato moves next door. Curious about her new neighbor, she soon finds that he lives alone and works himself to the bone as the only scholarship student for his school's baseball team. Not only that, but he's been living off nothing but convenience store food.

Worried for his health, Yakumo invites Yamato to eat dinner at her place from now on so he can perform his best. But after extending this invitation, she soon finds that the high schooler possesses a monstrous appetite, and she has to get creative to keep up with his dietary needs. All the while, Yamato's ability to pack away food brings back memories of Yakumo's husband.

And so begins the story of a lonely widow rediscovering her passion for cooking to feed a very hungry high schooler.

== Publication ==
The series is written and illustrated by Satomi U. It started serialization in Young Gangan on March 4, 2016. The series ended in Young Gangan on March 19, 2021. The series was collected into eleven tankōbon volumes. An autograph session with the author was held to commemorate the release of the final volume.

In November 2019, Square Enix announced they would publish the manga in English starting in October 2020. However, it was later delayed to February 2021 due to the COVID-19 pandemic.

=== Volume list ===
No.	Original release date	Original ISBN	English release date	English ISBN
1	September 24, 2016	978-4-75-755110-7	March 23, 2021	978-1-64-609062-4
2	November 25, 2016	978-4-75-755164-0	September 28, 2021	978-1-64-609063-1
3	April 25, 2017	978-4-75-755334-7	July 19, 2022	978-1-64-609064-8
4	October 25, 2017	978-4-75-755509-9	October 11, 2022	978-1-64-609065-5
5	March 24, 2018	978-4-75-755672-0	November 22, 2022	978-1-64-609066-2
6	October 25, 2018	978-4-75-755892-2	January 24, 2023	978-1-64-609067-9
7	March 25, 2019	978-4-75-756028-4	March 28, 2023	978-1-64-609068-6
8	September 25, 2019	978-4-75-756315-5	May 23, 2023	978-1-64-609069-3
9	March 25, 2020	978-4-75-756575-3	July 25, 2023	978-1-64-609087-7
10	October 24, 2020	978-4-75-756912-6	September 19, 2023	978-1-64-609124-9
11	March 25, 2021	978-4-75-757167-9	November 21, 2023	978-1-64-609137-9

== Reception ==
Sean Gaffney from Manga Bookshelf praised the first volume, calling it "sweet". Rebecca Silverman from Anime News Network praised the plot and characters, while criticizing the artwork in some frames. Like Gaffney, Demelza from Anime UK News also called the series "sweet".

== See also ==
- Heisei Haizanhei Sumire-chan, another manga series by Satomi U
