= Yuki ni Tsubasa =

Japanese manga series

- First tankōbon volume cover

雪にツバサ
- Genre: Fantasy; Romance
- Manga
- Written by: Shin Takahashi
- Published by: Kodansha
- Magazine: Weekly Young Magazine
- Original run: July 16, 2011 – May 13, 2013
- Volumes: 8
- Manga

Yuki ni Tsubasa: Haru
- Written by: Shin Takahashi
- Published by: Kodansha
- Magazine: Weekly Young Magazine
- Original run: May 27, 2013 – February 2, 2015
- Volumes: 8
- icon

Yuki ni Tsubasa: Esper meets girl @ northern small town (雪にツバサ; "Wings in the Snow") is a Japanese manga series written and illustrated by Shin Takahashi. It was serialized in Kodansha's seinen manga magazine Weekly Young Magazine from July 2011 to May 2013, with its chapters collected in eight tankōbon volumes. A sequel, titled Yuki ni Tsubasa: Haru, was serialized in the same magazine from May 2013 to February 2015, with its chapters collected in eight tankōbon volumes.

== Publication ==
Written and illustrated by Shin Takahashi, Kanata-Kakeru was serialized in Kodansha's seinen manga magazine Weekly Young Magazine from July 16, 2011, to May 13, 2013. Kodansha collected its chapters in eight tankōbon volumes, released from December 6, 2011, to December 20, 2013.

A sequel to the manga, titled Yuki ni Tsubasa: Haru (雪にツバサ・春; "Wings in Snow: Spring"), was serialized in the same magazine from May 27, 2013, to February 2, 2015. Kodansha collected its chapters in eight tankōbon volumes, released from May 2, 2014, to October 6, 2015.

=== Volumes ===
==== Yuki ni Tsubasa ====
No.	Japanese release date	Japanese ISBN
1	December 6, 2011	978-4-06-382119-2
2	January 23, 2012	978-4-06-382126-0
3	May 7, 2012	978-4-06-382177-2
4	September 6, 2012	978-4-06-382217-5
5	December 21, 2012	978-4-06-382246-5
6	May 2, 2013	978-4-06-382297-7
7	September 6, 2013	978-4-06-382348-6
8	December 20, 2013	978-4-06-382388-2

==== Yuki ni Tsubasa: Haru ====
No.	Japanese release date	Japanese ISBN
1	May 2, 2014	978-4-06-382449-0
2	August 6, 2014	978-4-06-382505-3
3	November 6, 2014	978-4-06-382529-9
4	December 5, 2014	978-4-06-382541-1
5	March 6, 2015	978-4-06-382562-6
6	May 1, 2015	978-4-06-382587-9
7	July 6, 2015	978-4-06-382628-9
8	October 6, 2015	978-4-06-382677-7
