= Dragon no I de Oyasumi =

Japanese manga series

- First tankōbon volume cover

ドラゴンの胃でおやすみ (Doragon no I de Oyasumi)
- Genre: Fantasy
- Manga
- Written by: Yū Ōhashi
- Illustrated by: Ryū Nishimura
- Published by: Kodansha
- Imprint: Young Magazine KC
- Magazine: Weekly Young Magazine
- Original run: February 8, 2026 – present
- Volumes: 3
- icon

Dragon no I de Oyasumi (Japanese: ドラゴンの胃でおやすみ, Hepburn: Doragon no I de Oyasumi; lit. 'Good Night in the Dragon's Stomach') is a Japanese manga series written by Yū Ōhashi and illustrated by Ryū Nishimura. It began serialization in Kodansha's seinen manga magazine Weekly Young Magazine in February 2026.

== Synopsis ==
Lisa Linna, is a knight commander who is the object of everyone's admiration. Though she loves the attention for her work, Lisa's real job is reminiscent to that of a middle manager, where she is given orders by her superiors. One day while at work, Lisa encounters a dragon, and ends up getting eaten. She later wakes up and finds out that she has entered a world different from her own.

== Publication ==
Written by Yū Ōhashi and illustrated by Ryū Nishimura, Dragon no I de Oyasumi began serialization in Kodansha's seinen manga magazine Weekly Young Magazine on February 8, 2026. Its chapters have been compiled into three tankōbon volumes as of September 2026.

No.	Release date	ISBN
1	May 1, 2026	978-4-06-543360-7
2	July 6, 2026	978-4-06-544251-7
3	September 17, 2026	978-4-06-544837-3

== Reception ==
The series was ranked fourth in the fifth Crea Late Night Manga Awards in 2026.
