= The Ping Pong Club =

Japanese manga series

- First tankōbon volume cover, featuring Maeno (center) and the rest of the members of the Ping Pong Club

行け!稲中卓球部 (Ike! Inachū Takkyū-bu)
- Genre: Comedy
- Manga
- Written by: Minoru Furuya
- Published by: Kodansha
- Magazine: Weekly Young Magazine
- Original run: 1993 – 1996
- Volumes: 13
- Anime television series
- Directed by: Masami Hata
- Written by: Sukehiro Tomita
- Music by: Katz Hoshi
- Studio: Grouper Productions
- Licensed by: NA: Central Park Media
- Original network: TBS
- Original run: April 6, 1995 – September 8, 1995
- Episodes: 26
- icon

The Ping Pong Club (Japanese: 行け!稲中卓球部, Hepburn: Ike! Inachū Takkyū-bu; lit. 'Go! Inachū Middle School Ping-Pong Club') is a Japanese manga series written and illustrated by Minoru Furuya. It was serialized in Kodansha's seinen manga magazine Weekly Young Magazine from 1993 to 1996, with its chapters collected in 13 tankōbon volumes. It is about the dysfunctional members of a middle school ping-pong club.

The Ping Pong Club was adapted by Grouper Productions into a 26-episode anime television series. It was licensed in North America by Central Park Media.

The Ping Pong Club manga has had over 25 million copies in circulation. In 1996, the manga won the 20th Kodansha Manga Award for the general category.

== Plot ==
The series focuses on an unconventional ping-pong club whose members show greater interest in lewd humor than athletic competition. When Kyōko Iwashita becomes the club's manager, she attempts to redirect the team's focus toward actual ping-pong, despite constant distractions and the members' lack of discipline.

== Characters ==
Maeno (前野)
Voiced by: Kōsuke Okano (Japanese); James Carter Cathcart (as Jimmy Zoppi) (English)
Maeno is the de facto leader of the Ping Pong Club, known for his eccentric demeanor and pride in his physique, particularly his backside. Despite his peculiar and often perverse behavior, he unexpectedly attracts female attention, as well as the admiration of his close friend Izawa.
Hiromi Izawa (井沢 ひろみ, Izawa Hiromi)
Voiced by: Takumi Yamazaki (Japanese); Buddy Woodward (English)
Izawa, a chivalrous but sometimes pervert boxing fan, models his shoulder-length hair after Ashita no Joe protagonist Joe Yabuki. He often plays female roles in games with Maeno, despite their close friendship. Izawa opposes Maeno's romantic pursuits, even impersonating a woman to interfere.
Takeda (竹田)
Voiced by: Tsutomu Takayama (Japanese); Crispin Freeman (as Mark Percy) (English)
Takeda is one of the Ping Pong Club's most attractive members, recognized for his bowl-cut hairstyle with short bangs. Kyōko harbors a strong romantic interest in him, which culminates in an incident where he touches her breasts while Maeno, Izawa, and Tanaka hide naked in a locker.
Yūsuke Kinoshita (木之下 ゆうすけ, Kinoshita Yūsuke)
Voiced by: Susumu Kaseta (Japanese); Wayne Grayson (as Hans Brikfeice) (English)
Kinoshita is one of the Ping Pong Club's most attractive members, sporting shoulder-length hair and widespread popularity among female students. His composed demeanor makes him a frequent object of admiration, though Maeno and Izawa once manipulate his appearance by dressing him as a woman, leading Tanaka to pursue him. In the English adaptation, he speaks with a relaxed, surfer-like accent.
Tanaka (田中)
Voiced by: Yasuhiro Takato (Japanese); Gil Goujons (English)
Tanaka, a diminutive yet notorious figure in the Ping Pong Club, comes from a family historically associated with peculiar obsessions. He frequently becomes an unwitting participant in Maeno and Izawa's antics and habitually addresses female crushes as "Mommy".
Gorō Mitchell Tanabe (田辺・ミッチェル・五郎, Tanabe Mitcheru Gorō)
Voiced by: Masato Amada (Japanese); Dan Green (as Jack Bean) (English)
Tanabe, a biracial Japanese-American, stands out with his blond hair and blue eyes. Kind-hearted and compassionate, he frequently assists others, particularly his close friend Tanaka. Despite his gentle nature, he struggles with severe body odor, which only pool disinfectant has proven effective against.
Kyōko Iwashita (岩下 京子, Iwashita Kyōko)
Voiced by: Sakura Uehara (Japanese); Sharon Becker (as Cookie D'Goodie) (English)
Kyōko serves as the Ping Pong Club's strict manager, appointed by the principal to curb her rebellious tendencies. She endures the team's persistent advances with barely restrained patience. During a crucial tournament, she motivates the underperforming team by offering a provocative reward—a pass entitling the best player to unrestricted access to her body for a month—which drives them to reach the city finals.
Chiyoko Kamiya (神谷 ちよこ, Kamiya Chiyoko)
Voiced by: Nanami Kurosaki (Japanese); Kayzie Rogers (as Paula Brown) (English)
A shy transfer student develops romantic feelings for Kinoshita and joins the Ping Pong Club to attract his attention. Seeking to improve her skills, she naively chooses Izawa as her instructor. Izawa, who fantasizes about dominating an obedient female student, quickly exploits his position of authority over her.

== Media ==
=== Manga ===
Written and illustrated by Minoru Furuya, The Ping Pong Club was serialized in Kodansha's seinen manga magazine Weekly Young Magazine from 1993 to 1996. Kodansha collected its chapters in thirteen tankōbon volumes, released from November 6, 1993, to February 6, 1997.

==== Volumes ====
No.	Release date	ISBN
1	November 6, 1993	4-06-323432-0
2	March 5, 1994	4-06-323450-9
3	June 6, 1994	4-06-323471-1
4	September 6, 1994	4-06-323487-8
5	January 9, 1995	4-06-323510-6
6	April 6, 1995	4-06-323528-9
7	July 6, 1995	4-06-323546-7
8	December 6, 1995	4-06-323568-8
9	March 6, 1996	4-06-323586-6
10	July 5, 1996	4-06-336605-7
11	October 4, 1996	4-06-336627-8
12	January 8, 1997	4-06-336644-8
13	February 6, 1997	4-06-336648-0

=== Anime ===
A 26-episode (consisting of two segments each) anime television series adaptation, animated by Grouper Productions, was broadcast in Japan on TBS from April 6 to September 28, 1995.

In North America, the series was licensed by Central Park Media and released under their Software Sculptors label. The series had first a sub only release on VHS starting in 1999. It was later released with an English dub on five DVDs, starting from the fourth volume, released on October 9, 2001; the fifth volume was released on December 11, 2001, and the first to third DVDs were released from August 13 to December 3, 2002. A DVD box collection was released on December 3, 2002.

==== Episodes ====
No.	Title	Original release date
1	"School Boys / Evil Plot"; Transliteration: "Kōsha no Rokuri / Jiage Kyōshi no Inbō" (Japanese: 校舎の六人 / 地上げ教師の陰謀)	April 6, 1995
2	"Half-Baked / The Worms"; Transliteration: "Fukanzen Nenshō Otoko / Mushikera no Gyakushū" (Japanese: 不完全燃焼男 / 虫けらの逆襲)	April 12, 1995
3	"Maeno Germ / Seductive Snob"; Transliteration: "Dango Mushi no Yō ni / Tsuntsun Musume" (Japanese: ダンゴ虫のように / ツンツン娘)	April 29, 1995
4	"The Purchase / Hot Summer"; Transliteration: "Kaimono Bugi / Natsuiatsu" (Japanese: 買い物ブギ / 夏い暑)	April 27, 1995
5	"Training Camp / Curse of Takeda"; Transliteration: "Osaru na Gasshuku / Norowa Reta Kamo Shirenai Takeda" (Japanese: おサルな合宿 / 呪われたかもしれない竹田)	May 4, 1995
6	"Sixty Years / Burning Spirit"; Transliteration: "Takkyū-reki Roku Jū-nen no Waza / Sorezore no Yaru Ki" (Japanese: 卓球歴六十年の技 / それぞれのヤル気)	May 11, 1995
7	"Inachu Vs. / Sex Ticket"; Transliteration: "Inachu Bāsasu Kishinaka / Furī Sekkusu-ken no Yukue" (Japanese: 稲中VS岸中 / フリーセックス券の行方)	May 18, 1995
8	"Love & Comedy / Love & Comedy Part II"; Transliteration: "Rabu Kome Shine Shinedan Tōjō (Mae-hen) / Rabu Kome Shine Shinedan Tōjō (Ato-hen)" (Japanese: ラブコメ死ね死ね団 登場 （前編） / ラブコメ死ね死ね団登場（後編）)	May 24, 1995
9	"First Love / Loser's Community"; Transliteration: "Ubawa Reta Hatsukoi / Dame Ningen Kyōdōtai" (Japanese: うばわれた初恋 / ダメ人間共同体)	June 1, 1995
10	"Dress-Up Dolls / Ultra Tanabe"; Transliteration: "Kise Ka e Ningyō / Chōjin Tanabe" (Japanese: 着せかえ人形 / 超人TANABE)	June 8, 1995
11	"Winning the Lottery! Part 1 / Winning the Lottery! Part 2"; Transliteration: "Ikkakusenkin Otoko Mae-hen / Ikkakusenkin Otoko Ato-hen" (Japanese: 一獲千金男前 編 / 一獲千金男後 編)	June 15, 1995
12	"Shibazaki's Plan / Survival"; Transliteration: "Shiba-chan no Buin Kōsei Keikaku / Sabaibaru" (Japanese: 柴ちゃんの部員更生計画 / サバイバル)	June 29, 1995
13	"Friendship / Tsutomu"; Transliteration: "Tomojō / Boku no Sukina Tsutomu-kun" (Japanese: 友情 / ぼくの好きなつとむ君)	July 6, 1995
14	"Saturday Hare / The Wimp"; Transliteration: "Doyō no Usagi / Koshinuke Otoko" (Japanese: 土曜のウサギ / 腰抜け男)	July 13, 1995
15	"The Outcast / Shorty"; Transliteration: "O miso / Chibi" (Japanese: おみそ / チビ)	July 20, 1995
16	"Dr. Maeno Part I / Dr. Maeno Part II"; Transliteration: "Dokutā Maeno "Orega Yarazu ni Dare ga Yaru" Dai Sakusen Mae-hen / Dokutā Maeno "Orega Yarazu ni Dare ga Yaru" Dai Sakusen Ato-hen" (Japanese: ドクター前野「オレがやらずに誰がやる」大作戦前編 / ドクター前野「オレがやらずに誰がやる」大作戦後編)	July 27, 1995
17	"Find Happiness / Sheds His Skin"; Transliteration: "Maeno, Shiawase o Tsukamu / Maeno, Hitokawa Mukeru" (Japanese: 前野、幸せをつかむ / 前野、ひと皮むける)	August 3, 1995
18	"Partner? Part I / Partner? Part II"; Transliteration: "Aikata wa Dokoda? Zenpen / Aikata wa Dokoda? Kōhen" (Japanese: 相方はどこだ？ 前編 / 相方はどこだ？ 後編)	August 10, 1995
19	"The Unfortunates / May I Have It?"; Transliteration: "Fukōna Kyōdai / Sore, Kudasa" (Japanese: 不幸な兄妹 / それ、ください)	August 17, 1995
20	"A River / Retirement"; Transliteration: "Kawa / Intai" (Japanese: 川 / 引退)	August 24, 1995
21	"Loan King / Flaming Perverts"; Transliteration: "Shakkin Ō / Honō no Reipā" (Japanese: 借金王 / 炎のレイパー)	August 31, 1995
22	"The Invasion / Into the Big Sky"; Transliteration: "Shinryaku / Ōzora ni Mukatte" (Japanese: 侵略 / 大空に向かって)	September 7, 1995
23	"I've Got Guts / A Dramatic Photo!"; Transliteration: "Konjō Arimasu / Gekisha!" (Japanese: 根性あります / 激写！)	September 14, 1995
24	"Fake Drunkard / Takeda Fondles"; Transliteration: "Nise Dorankā / Takeda, Oppai o Momu" (Japanese: にせドランカー / 竹田、おっぱいをもむ)	September 21, 1995
25	"Wanted Part I / Wanted Part II"; Transliteration: "Kyūbo Zenpen / Kyūbo Kōhen" (Japanese: 急募 前編 / 急募 後編)	September 25, 1995
26	"Dandy Principal / The Drifters"; Transliteration: "Dandi Kōchō / Nagare-sha" (Japanese: ダンディ校長 / 流れ者)	September 28, 1995

== Reception ==
The manga has had over 25 million copies in circulation. In 1996, the manga won the 20th Kodansha Manga Award for general manga.
