= Wanitokagegisu =

Japanese manga series

- First tankōbon volume cover

わにとかげぎす
- Genre: Comedy; Mystery; Suspense
- Manga
- Written by: Minoru Furuya
- Published by: Kodansha
- Magazine: Weekly Young Magazine
- Original run: March 27, 2006 – May 14, 2007
- Volumes: 4
- Television drama
- Directed by: Toshio Tsuboi; Izuru Kumasaka; Izumi Masahide; Aya Matsuki
- Written by: Izumi Takahashi
- Music by: Akihiro Manabe
- Original network: TBS
- Original run: July 19, 2017 – September 27, 2017
- Episodes: 10
- icon

Wanitokagegisu (わにとかげぎす; 'Crocodile and Lizard') is a Japanese manga series written and illustrated by Minoru Furuya. It was serialized in Kodansha's seinen manga magazine Weekly Young Magazine from March 2006 to May 2007, with its chapters collected in four tankōbon volumes. A ten-episode television drama adaptation was broadcast from July to September 2017.

== Media ==
=== Manga ===
Written and illustrated by Minoru Furuya, Wanitokagegisu was serialized in Kodansha's seinen manga magazine Weekly Young Magazine from March 27, 2006, (Note: It started in the magazine's 17th issue of 2006, released on March 27 of that same year.) to May 14, 2007. (Note: It finished in the magazine's 24th issue of 2007, released on May 14 of that same year.) Kodansha collected its chapters in four tankōbon volumes, released from September 6, 2006, to July 6, 2007.

=== Drama ===
A ten-episode television drama adaptation was broadcast on TBS from July 19 to September 27, 2017.
