= Kenka Shōbai =

Japanese manga series

- Cover of the first volume of the manga

喧嘩商売
- Genre: Martial arts
- Manga
- Written by: Yasuaki Kita
- Published by: Kodansha
- Imprint: Young Magazine KC
- Magazine: Weekly Young Magazine
- Original run: 2005 – 2010
- Volumes: 24
- Manga

Kenka Kagyō
- Written by: Yasuaki Kita
- Published by: Kodansha
- Imprint: Young Magazine KC
- Magazine: Weekly Young Magazine
- Original run: December 9, 2013 – present
- Volumes: 13

Kenka Shōbai (喧嘩商売; 'Fighting Business') is a Japanese manga series written and illustrated by Yasuaki Kita. It was published in Kodansha's seinen manga magazine Weekly Young Magazine from 2005 to 2010. Twenty four volumes compiling the chapters were published between 2005 and 2011. Kenka Kagyō (喧嘩稼業), a related series by the same author, is published in the same magazine since December 9, 2013, and thirteen volumes compiling the chapters have been released so far.

== Plot ==
The series follows the adventures of Jubei Sato, a high school student who transferred from Tokyo to a high school in Utsunomiya, and gets involved in a life of fighting. Sato, who is extremely self-centered, narcissistic, boisterous, and irreverent, happens to be a genius at fighting, who does not hesitate to use any means necessary to win, often using various schemes to gain an advantage over his opponents.

== Volumes ==
=== Kenka Shōbai ===
Number	Release date	Oricon	Copies sold	Ref.
1	October 6, 2005			
2	January 6, 2006			
3	April 6, 2006			
4	July 6, 2006			
5	November 6, 2006			
6	March 6, 2007			
7	June 6, 2007			
8	August 6, 2007			
9	December 6, 2007			
10	March 6, 2008			
11	June 6, 2008			
12	September 6, 2008			
13	December 6, 2008		47,875	
14	March 6, 2009	29	48,098	
15	May 6, 2009	17	42,644	
16	July 6, 2009	21	35,953	
17	September 6, 2009	24	44,404	
18	November 6, 2009	23	46,683	
19	February 5, 2010	25	50,217	
20	April 5, 2010	13	45,928	
21	July 5, 2010	14	43,903	
22	September 5, 2010	10	45,845	
23	November 5, 2010	25	52,411	
24	February 4, 2011	16	54,914	

=== Kenka Kagyō ===
Number	Release date	Oricon	Copies sold	Ref.
1	April 4, 2014	39	45,868	
2	September 5, 2014	24	51,360	
3	January 6, 2015	23	57,965	
4	June 5, 2015			
5	October 6, 2015			
6	April 6, 2016			
7	June 6, 2016			
8	April 6, 2017			
9	November 6, 2017			
10	April 6, 2018			
11	September 6, 2018			
12	November 6, 2019			
13	April 6, 2020			
