= Manchuria Opium Squad =

Japanese manga series

- First tankōbon volume cover, featuring Li Hua

満州アヘンスクワッド (Manshū Ahen Sukuwaddo)
- Genre: Crime; Historical; Suspense
- Manga
- Written by: Tsukasa Monma
- Illustrated by: Shikako (2020–25); Tsurushima (2026–present)
- Published by: Kodansha
- English publisher: Kodansha (digital); NA: Kodansha USA
- Magazine: Comic Days (April 9, 2020 – September 9, 2021); Weekly Young Magazine (September 18, 2021 – present)
- Original run: April 9, 2020 – present
- Volumes: 22
- Anime
- icon

Manchuria Opium Squad (Japanese: 満州アヘンスクワッド, Hepburn: Manshū Ahen Sukuwaddo) is a Japanese manga series written by Tsukasa Monma and illustrated by Shikako (2020–2025) and Tsurushima (since 2026). It was first serialized on Kodansha's Comic Days online platform from April 2020 to September 2021, before being transferred to the publisher's seinen manga magazine Weekly Young Magazine. Its chapters have been collected in 22 tankōbon as of November 2025. An anime adaptation has been announced.

== Plot ==
In the puppet state of Manchukuo during the Second Sino-Japanese War, a young man named Isamu Higata is sent to serve the Imperial Japanese Army's Kwantung branch. After his mother contracts plague, he utilizes botanical and chemical knowledge to make money from producing opioids, slipping into a deeper conspiracy where he encounters various gang members and oppressive government officials.

== Characters ==
Isamu Higata (日方 勇, Higata Isamu)
Originally a soldier for the Kwantung Army, Isamu becomes the breadwinner of his mother and two siblings. After his mother catches the plague, Isamu becomes a manufacturer of opium to afford medicine. Isamu has extensive knowledge on chemistry and plants, which gives him the skills to create pure opium. After the death of his mother, Isamu vows to give his siblings a better life. Isamu befriends Li Hua, a former member of the Green Gang, and begins his infiltration of the opium trade in Manchuria. After some obstacles and hardships, Isamu's morals change for the worse. His opium causes an increase in addiction and death, which Isamu claims is a necessary cost for a better life. Eventually, Isamu becomes the Emperor of the criminal underworld, a complete change to the man he was in the past.

== Media ==
=== Manga ===
Written by Tsukasa Monma and illustrated by Shikako (2020–2025) and Tsurushima (since 2026), Manchuria Opium Squad started on Kodansha's online platform Comic Days on April 9, 2020. Its 64th and last chapter on the platform was published on September 9, 2021, and the series was transferred to the publisher's seinen manga magazine Weekly Young Magazine on September 18 of the same year. Kodansha has collected its chapters into individual tankōbon volumes. The first volume was released on August 11, 2020. As of November 6, 2025, 22 volumes have been released.

In October 2025, it was announced that the manga would switch to an irregular release schedule out of consideration for Shikako's health. On December 22, 2025, the manga editors announced that Shikako died on November 8 due to a choroidal melanoma. The illustrator wanted someone to complete the series in their place, and the Young Magazine staff stated they would respect their wishes, adding that plans to find a replacement artist were undetermined at the time of the announcement. In September 2026, it was announced that manga artist Tsurushima, a senior colleague of Shikako from their time working as assistants on Yasuhisa Hara's Kingdom, would take over as the series's artist. Hara stated that Shikako expressed before they died the hope that an artist from Kingdom would take over the artwork for Manchuria Opium Squad. The series resumed Weekly Young Magazine on October 5, 2026, with two chapters. The 12-page Chapter 216 was originally planned to be 16 pages long. Shikako was able to complete 11 pages before their death. Monma arranged the 12th page, which does not feature any characters, and the assistant(s) who supported Shikako drew the background. From Chapter 217, the manga features Tsurushima's art.

Kodansha publishes the series digitally in English on its K Manga service. Kodansha USA started publishing the volumes digitally on September 10, 2024. In October 2026, Kodansha USA announced that it would begin releasing print volumes in January 2027.

==== Volumes ====
No.	Original release date	Original ISBN	English release date	English ISBN
1	August 11, 2020	978-4-06-520467-2	September 10, 2024	979-8-88-933482-8
2	November 11, 2020	978-4-06-521342-1	October 15, 2024	979-8-88-933483-5
3	February 10, 2021	978-4-06-522292-8	November 12, 2024	979-8-88-933484-2
4	May 12, 2021	978-4-06-523340-5	January 14, 2025	979-8-88-933655-6
5	August 11, 2021	978-4-06-524339-8	March 11, 2025	979-8-88-933656-3
6	November 5, 2021	978-4-06-525875-0	May 13, 2025	979-8-88-933657-0
7	February 4, 2022	978-4-06-526827-8	July 8, 2025	979-8-89-478282-9
8	April 6, 2022	978-4-06-527477-4	September 23, 2025	979-8-89-478283-6
9	June 6, 2022	978-4-06-528107-9	November 25, 2025	979-8-89-478284-3
10	September 6, 2022	978-4-06-529116-0	January 6, 2026	979-8-89-478285-0
11	December 6, 2022	978-4-06-530032-9	March 3, 2026	979-8-89-478286-7
12	March 6, 2023	978-4-06-531057-1	May 5, 2026	979-8-89-478287-4
13	June 6, 2023	978-4-06-532030-3	July 7, 2026	979-8-89-478288-1
14	September 6, 2023	978-4-06-533013-5	September 8, 2026	979-8-89-478289-8
15	January 9, 2024	978-4-06-534301-2	—	—
16	April 5, 2024	978-4-06-535242-7	—	—
17	July 5, 2024	978-4-06-536270-9	—	—
18	October 4, 2024	978-4-06-537261-6	—	—
19	January 6, 2025	978-4-06-538177-9	—	—
20	April 4, 2025	978-4-06-539223-2	—	—
21	July 4, 2025	978-4-06-540169-9	—	—
22	November 6, 2025	978-4-06-541401-9	—	—

=== Anime ===
In October 2026, it was announced that the manga will receive an anime adaptation.

== Reception ==
By October 2026, the manga had over 3.5 million copies in circulation. The manga was nominated for the 47th Kodansha Manga Award in the general category in 2023. It was also nominated for the 70th Shogakukan Manga Award in 2024.

== See also ==
- Guilty Circle, another manga series by the same writer
