= Zomia (manga) =

Japanese manga series by Sohei Asamura and Ten Ishida

- First tankōbon volume cover

ゾミア
- Genre: Epic, Historical
- Manga
- Written by: Sohei Asamura
- Illustrated by: Ten Ishida
- Published by: Kodansha
- Imprint: Young Magazine KC
- Magazine: Weekly Young Magazine (February 2022–July 2022); Yanmaga Web (August 2022–September 2022)
- Original run: February 28, 2022 – September 17, 2022
- Volumes: 3

Zomia (Japanese: ゾミア) is a Japanese manga series written by Sohei Asamura and illustrated by Ten Ishida. It started in Kodansha's seinen manga magazine Weekly Young Magazine in February 2022. It finished in the magazine in July 2022, and moved to the Yanmaga Web website and app in August of the same year. The series ended its serialization in September 2022, with its chapters collected in three tankōbon volumes.

In 2020, Zomia won two awards at 83rd Chiba Tetsuya Award in the shōnen category.

== Publication ==
Zomia based on a one-shot that Sohei Asamura wrote and illustrated. The manga series illustrated by Ten Ishida began its serialization in Kodansha's seinen manga magazine Weekly Young Magazine on February 28, 2022. The series finished in Weekly Young Magazine on July 15, 2022, and moved to the Yanmaga Web manga website and app on August 6 of the same year. The series ended its serialization on September 17, 2022. Kodansha collected its chapters in three tankōbon volumes, released from May 6, 2022, to November 4, 2022.

=== Volumes ===
No.	Release date	ISBN
1	May 6, 2022	978-4-06-527807-9
2	August 5, 2022	978-4-06-528802-3
3	November 4, 2022	978-4-06-529752-0

== Reception ==
In 2020, Zomia won two awards at 83rd Chiba Tetsuya Award in the shōnen category.
