= Himizu (manga) =

Japanese manga series

- First tankōbon volume cover

ヒミズ
- Genre: Psychological drama
- Manga
- Written by: Minoru Furuya
- Published by: Kodansha
- Magazine: Weekly Young Magazine
- Original run: January 29, 2001 – March 11, 2002
- Volumes: 4
- Live-action film
- Himizu (2011 film)
- icon

Himizu (ヒミズ) is a Japanese manga series written and illustrated by Minoru Furuya. It was serialized in Kodansha's seinen manga magazine Weekly Young Magazine from January 2001 to March 2002, with its chapters collected in four tankōbon volumes. The manga was adapted into a live action film adaptation which was shown at the 68th Venice International Film Festival, held in Venice, Italy, in 2011, and premiered in Japan in January 2012.

== Synopsis ==
The series follows Sumida, a 14-year-old boy who tries to live quietly and independently, like a mole (himizu), after his alcoholic, abusive father abandons the family and his mother leaves with another man.

== Media ==
=== Manga ===
Written and illustrated by Minoru Furuya, Himizu was serialized in Kodansha's seinen manga magazine Weekly Young Magazine from January 29, 2001, to March 11, 2002. Kodansha collected its chapters in four tankōbon volumes, released from July 23, 2001, to August 5, 2005.

==== Volumes ====
No.	Japanese release date	Japanese ISBN
1	July 23, 2001	4-06-336962-5
2	December 26, 2001	4-06-361010-1
3	May 2, 2002	4-06-361040-3
4	July 5, 2002	4-06-361055-1

=== Film ===
A live action film adaptation was shown at the 68th Venice International Film Festival, held from August 31 to September 10, 2011, in Venice, Italy, and premiered in Japan on January 14, 2012.

=== Stage play ===
A stage play adaptation ran at the Mixalive Tokyo's Theater Mixa, Tokyo, from September 18–26, 2021.
