= Minetarō Mochizuki =

Japanese manga artist

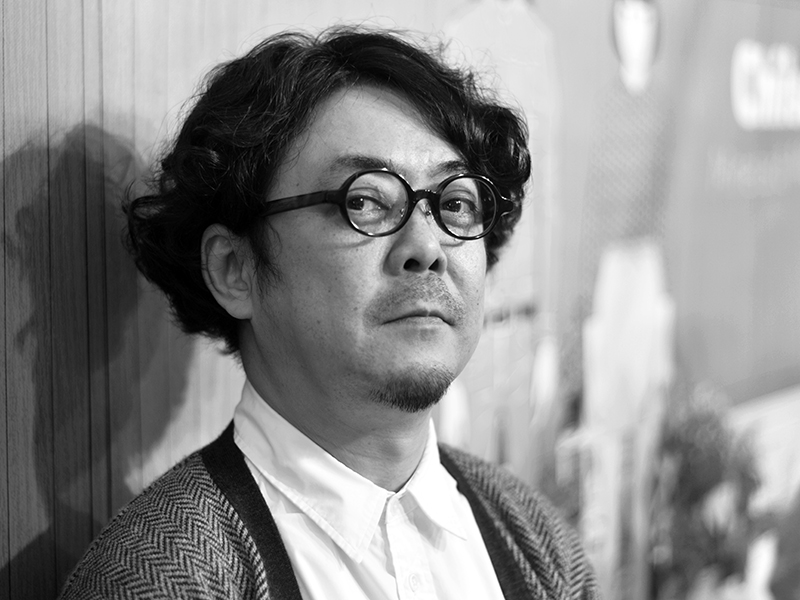
- Born: January 29, 1964 (age 62) Yokohama, Japan
- Area: Manga artist
- Notable works: Batāshi Kingyo; Dragon Head
- Awards: 4th Tezuka Osamu Cultural Prize Award for Excellence – Dragon Head; 21st Kodansha Manga Award (General Manga) – Dragon Head

Minetarō Mochizuki (Japanese: 望月峯太郎, Hepburn: Mochizuki Minetarō; born January 29, 1964) is a Japanese manga artist.

== Life and career ==
He grew up in a single parent household and spent a lot of time alone at home, which is when he would start drawing on the shoji at home. He became an avid reader of the horror manga of Kazuo Umezu in elementary school.

Mochizuki graduated from Tokyo Design Gakuin. In 1984, he won the 11th Tetsuya Chiba Award for outstanding newcomer for the short story "Tadatada Honobo no Heart". He wanted to participate in the competition, because he respected Tetsuya Chiba and knew that he would be one of the judges. This newcomer award led to his first publication as a professional manga artist in 1985 in Kodansha's seinen manga magazine Weekly Young Magazine. He immediately published his first series, Bataashi Kingyo, which became a success and ran until 1988. In the comedy, an unpopular high school student joins the swimming team of his school for his romantic interest, even though he cannot swim.

He continued working for Young Magazine and was successful throughout the 1990s. He drew the horror manga Hauntress (1993) and the comedy Samehada Otoko to Momojiri Onna (1993–1994). One of his biggest successes came with Dragon Head, which he serialized in Young Magazine from 1994 until 1999. The manga follows a high school student whose train enters a tunnel and has an accident. When he manages to get out of the tunnel, he finds the world devastated and tries to unravel what happened.

In the 2000s, he started working for the magazine Morning instead, although still with Kodansha. He published the series Maiwai (2002–2008) and Tōkyō Kaidō (2008–2010) in the magazine.

In the 2010s, he started to work for Shogakukan's seinen magazines as well and shifted his focus towards adaptations rather than original stories. He drew Chiisakobee, based on a novel by Shūgorō Yamamoto, for Big Comic Spirits from 2012 until 2015. After a break, he drew a manga version of the animation film Isle of Dogs upon Wes Anderson's and Kunichi Nomura's request and serialized it in Morning in 2018.

== Style ==
Mochizuki was influenced by the New Wave movement that came up in the late 1970s and early 1980s. He cites especially heta-uma artist Yoshikazu Ebisu as an influence in his work.

In the 2000s, with Tōkyō Kaidō, his style became gradually more streamlined, with more attention to details and to body parts. He thought that limiting lines and choosing them well would make the series stronger.

== Reception ==
Three of his works have been adapted into live-action films. Bataashi Kingyo (1990) was directed by Joji Matsuoka, Samehada Otoko to Momojiri Onna (1999) by Katsuhito Ishii and Dragon Head (2003) by George Iida. Ochanoma was adapted into a TV drama in 1993.

His work has been translated into English, French, Spanish, Italian, German, and Polish.

He won the Award for Excellence at the 4th Tezuka Osamu Cultural Prize and the Award for General Manga at the 21st Kodansha Manga Award for Dragon Head. For Chiisakobee, he received an Excellence Award at the 17th Japan Media Arts Festival in 2013. The manga also won the Fauve D'Angoulême – Prix de la Série at the Angoulême International Comics Festival in 2017.

== Works ==
Title	Year	Notes	Refs
Bataashi Kingyo (バタアシ金魚)	1985–1988	Serialized in Weekly Young Magazine; Published by Kodansha in 6 vol.	
Bikemen (バイクメ〜ン)	1989–1990	Serialized in Weekly Young Magazine; Published by Kodansha in 4 vol.	
Ochanoma (お茶の間)	1991–1992	Serialized in Mister Magazine; Published by Kodansha in 3 vol.	
Hauntress (座敷女, Zashiki Onna)	1993	Serialized in Weekly Young Magazine; Published by Kodansha in 1 vol.	
Samehada Otoko to Momojiri Onna (鮫肌男と桃尻女)	1993–1994	Serialized in Mister Magazine; Published by Kodansha in 1 vol.	
Dragon Head (ドラゴンヘッド, Doragon heddo)	1994-1999	Serialized in Weekly Young Magazine; Published by Kodansha in 10 vol.	
Zutto Saki no Hanashi (ずっと先の話)	2001	Short story collection published by Kodansha; Includes short stories published in Weekly Young Magazine, Comic Cue, Young Magazine Kaizokuban, Mister Magazine and Zōkan Exacta between 1988 and 2001	
Maiwai (万祝)	2002-2008	Serialized in Morning; Published by Kodansha in 11 vol.	
Tōkyō Kaidō (東京怪童)	2008–2010	Serialized in Morning; Published by Kodansha in 3 vol.	
Chiisakobee (ちいさこべえ)	2012–2015	Based on a novel by Shūgorō Yamamoto; Serialized in Weekly Big Comic Spirits; Published by Shogakukan in 4 vol.	
Isle of Dogs (犬ヶ島, Inugashima)	2018	Based on the film Isle of Dogs by Wes Anderson; Serialized in Morning; Published by Kodansha in 1 vol.	
Frederick (フレデリック)	2020–2021	Story by Naoto Yamakawa based on a book by Leo Lionni; Serialized in Big Comic Original	
No Comic, No Life (没有漫画 没有人生 ノーコミック ノーライフ)	2022–2023	Serialized in Big Comic Original; Published by Shogakukan in 1 vol. (as of July 2023)	
