= Himeanole =

Japanese manga series

- First tankōbon volume cover

ヒメアノ～ル (Himeanōru)
- Genre: Mystery, suspense
- Manga
- Written by: Minoru Furuya
- Published by: Kodansha
- Magazine: Weekly Young Magazine
- Original run: June 2, 2008 – February 22, 2010
- Volumes: 6
- Live-action
- 2016 film
- icon

Himeanole (Japanese: ヒメアノ～ル, Hepburn: Himeanōru) is a Japanese manga series written and illustrated by Minoru Furuya. It was serialized in Kodansha's seinen manga magazine Weekly Young Magazine from June 2008 to February 2010, with its chapters collected in six tankōbon volumes. It was adapted into a live action film premiered in 2016.

== Plot ==
The series follows two former classmates whose lives diverge dramatically: Susumu Okada, a 25-year-old cleaning company employee trapped in a mundane existence, and Shoichi Morita, a psychologically disturbed serial killer. While Okada navigates an ordinary romance with coworker Yuji Ando and café clerk Yuka Abe, Morita's traumatic past manifests in violent sexual fantasies stemming from his first murder—strangling a high school bully.

Morita fixates on Yuka as his next victim, stalking her while committing other murders. After Okada and Yuka discover the threat and flee, Morita's mental state deteriorates. In a climactic dream sequence, he envisions himself in a hospital with severe brain damage, confronting his lifelong awareness of being psychologically "abnormal" since adolescence. This hallucination culminates in his tearful awakening to police capture, underscoring his tragic self-awareness and failed desire for normalcy.

== Media ==
=== Manga ===
Written and illustrated by Minoru Furuya, Himeanole was serialized in Kodansha's seinen manga magazine Weekly Young Magazine from June 2, 2008, to February 22, 2010. Kodansha collected its chapters in six tankōbon volumes, released from November 6, 2008, to April 6, 2010.

==== Volumes ====
No.	Release date	ISBN
1	November 6, 2008	978-4-06-361732-0
2	February 5, 2009	978-4-06-361754-2
3	June 5, 2009	978-4-06-361794-8
4	October 6, 2009	978-4-06-361827-3
5	February 5, 2010	978-4-06-361867-9
6	April 6, 2010	978-4-06-361881-5

=== Film ===
A live action film adaptation premiered in Japan on May 28, 2016.

== Reception ==
The six volumes of Himeanole were featured on Oricon's weekly chart of the best-selling manga; volume 1 sold 49,371 copies in its first two weeks; volume 2 sold 54,058 copies in its first two weeks; volume 3 sold 55,151 in its first two weeks; volume 4 sold 41,500 copies in its first week; volume 5 sold 48,215 copies in its first two weeks; and volume 6 sold 40,935 copies in its first week.
