= Chiisakobee =

Japanese manga series by Minetarō Mochizuki

- First tankōbon volume cover

ちいさこべえ
- Created by: Shūgorō Yamamoto
- Manga
- Written by: Minetarō Mochizuki
- Published by: Shogakukan
- English publisher: NA: Abrams ComicArts
- Magazine: Weekly Big Comic Spirits
- Original run: September 3, 2012 – February 9, 2015
- Volumes: 4
- icon

Chiisakobee (ちいさこべえ) is a Japanese manga series by Minetarō Mochizuki. It is a modern adaptation of Shūgorō Yamamoto's historical novel of the same name. It was serialized in Shogakukan's seinen manga magazine Weekly Big Comic Spirits from September 2012 to February 2015, with its chapters collected in four tankōbon volumes.

== Publication ==
Written and illustrated by Minetarō Mochizuki, Chiisakobee is a modern adaptation of Shūgorō Yamamoto's historical novel of the same name. The manga was serialized in Shogakukan's seinen manga magazine Weekly Big Comic Spirits from September 3, 2012, to February 9, 2015. Shogakukan collected its chapters in four tankōbon volumes, released from March 29, 2013, to March 30, 2015.

In October 2025, Abrams ComicArts announced that it had licensed the manga for English release in North America under its Kana imprint, with the first volume set to be released on June 23, 2026.

=== Volumes ===
No.	Original release date	Original ISBN	English release date	English ISBN
1	March 29, 2013	978-4-09-185109-3	June 23, 2026	9798887079608
2	September 30, 2013	978-4-09-185507-7	—	—
3	March 28, 2014	978-4-09-186137-5	—	—
4	March 30, 2015	978-4-09-186848-0	—	—

== Reception ==
Chiisakobee received an Excellence Award at the 17th Japan Media Arts Festival in 2013. The manga won the Fauve D'Angoulême - Prix de la Série at the Angoulême International Comics Festival in 2017.
