= Dragon Head =

Japanese manga series

- First tankōbon volume cover

ドラゴンヘッド (Doragon Heddo)
- Genre: Post-apocalyptic; Psychological horror; Science fiction
- Manga
- Written by: Minetarō Mochizuki
- Published by: Kodansha
- English publisher: NA: Tokyopop (former); Kodansha USA (current)
- Magazine: Weekly Young Magazine
- Original run: 1994 – 1999
- Volumes: 10
- Live-action film
- Directed by: George Iida
- Produced by: Takashi Hirano
- Written by: Masaru Nakamura; Hiroshi Saito; George Iida
- Music by: Yoshihiro Ike
- Studio: TBS; Dentsu; Amuse Pictures; Toho; Tokyo FM; The Mainichi Newspapers; Wowow; Culture Publishers; Sports Nippon; Twins Japan
- Released: August 30, 2003
- icon

Dragon Head (Japanese: ドラゴンヘッド, Hepburn: Doragon Heddo) is a Japanese manga series written and illustrated by Minetaro Mochizuki. It was serialized in Kodansha's seinen manga magazine Weekly Young Magazine from 1994 to 1999, with its chapters collected in ten tankōbon volumes. It was licensed for English release in North America by Tokyopop and later by Kodansha USA.

A live-action film adaptation directed by George Iida, was released in Japan in August 2003. It starred Satoshi Tsumabuki and Sayaka Kanda.

In 1997, Dragon Head won the 21st Kodansha Manga Award in the general category.

== Plot ==
Teru Aoki (青木 輝, Aoki Teru) witnesses a strange sight before his train derails in a tunnel during an earthquake. Awakening to find everyone dead except bullied classmate Nobuo Takahashi and injured Ako Seto, Teru helps Ako recover as Nobuo's paranoia grows. When Nobuo turns violent, Teru fights him off and escapes with Ako through ventilation shafts as lava fills the tunnel.

Emerging into an ash-covered wasteland, they learn society has collapsed. After encountering dangerous survivors, they meet military helicopter pilot Iwada and unstable Captain Nimura. When Nimura's crew turns hostile, Teru accidentally kills one with a Molotov cocktail before escaping a firestorm in their helicopter.

Diverted to Izu peninsula by ash clouds, they find survivors planning mass suicide. They rescue mysterious boy Kikuchi before fleeing the burning town. Discovering Mount Fuji has vanished, replaced by a massive crater, they crash-land near Tokyo. Separated, Teru finds Iwada dead and follows Ako's note to Tokyo's ruins.

There, he encounters a scientist's cult using fear-suppressing drugs before reuniting with Ako. Nimura turns on them, revealing Teru's family died in the disaster. After subduing him, they witness foreign soldiers arriving as a new volcano erupts in Tokyo's ruins, clinging to hope amid the devastation.

== Media ==
=== Manga ===
Written and illustrated by Minetarō Mochizuki, Dragon Head was serialized in Kodansha's seinen manga magazine Weekly Young Magazine from 1994 to 1999. Kodansha collected its chapters in ten tankōbon volumes, published from March 6, 1995, to April 21, 2000.

In North America, the manga was licensed for English release by Tokyopop. The ten volumes were released from January 10, 2006, to April 8, 2008. Kodansha USA re-licensed the series and released the ten volumes digitally on February 27, 2018. In February 2025, Kodansha USA announced that it will publish the series in four "2.5-in-1" omnibus volumes.

=== Live-action film ===
A live-action film adaptation directed by George Iida, was released in Japan by Toho on August 30, 2003. It starred Satoshi Tsumabuki and Sayaka Kanda.

== Reception ==
The manga has sold over 6.5 million copies. Dragon Head won the 21st Kodansha Manga Award in the general category in 1997. It won the Award for Excellence at the 4th Tezuka Osamu Cultural Prize in 2000.
