= Dare Demo Dakeru Kimi ga Suki =

Japanese manga series

- First tankōbon volume cover

だれでも抱けるキミが好き
- Genre: Erotic comedy; Romantic comedy
- Manga
- Written by: Super Takeda
- Published by: Kodansha
- Imprint: Young Magazine KC Special
- Magazine: Weekly Young Magazine
- Original run: April 17, 2023 – present
- Volumes: 11

Dare Demo Dakeru Kimi ga Suki (だれでも抱けるキミが好き) is a Japanese manga series written and illustrated by Super Takeda. It began serialization in Kodansha's seinen manga magazine Weekly Young Magazine in April 2023.

== Synopsis ==
Gotou is an ordinary high school student who admires his classmate Agawa, due to her personality and sociable behavior. One day after school, he catches Agawa having sex in class with another student, and Agawa invites him to participate. He later finds out that Agawa is a promiscuous girl with multiple sex friends.

== Publication ==
Written and illustrated by Super Takeda, Dare Demo Dakeru Kimi ga Suki began serialization in Kodansha's seinen manga magazine Weekly Young Magazine on April 17, 2023. Its chapters have been compiled into eleven tankōbon volumes as of October 2026.

No.	Release date	ISBN
1	September 6, 2023	978-4-06-532755-5
2	December 6, 2023	978-4-06-533949-7
3	March 6, 2024	978-4-06-535065-2
4	August 6, 2024	978-4-06-535827-6
5	December 6, 2024	978-4-06-536287-7
6	April 4, 2025	978-4-06-538913-3
7	August 6, 2025	978-4-06-540171-2
8	February 6, 2026	978-4-06-542532-9
9	April 6, 2026	978-4-06-543194-8
10	July 6, 2026	978-4-06-544233-3
11	October 6, 2026	978-4-06-545176-2

== Reception ==
By August 2025, the series had over a million copies in circulation.
