= Sanzennenme no Kamitaiō =

Japanese manga series

- First tankōbon volume cover

三千年目の神対応
- Genre: Romantic comedy
- Manga
- Written by: Fumitaka Katō
- Published by: Kodansha
- Imprint: Young Magazine KC
- Magazine: Weekly Young Magazine
- Original run: December 21, 2020 – November 22, 2021
- Volumes: 3

Sanzennenme no Kamitaiō (三千年目の神対応; "God's Response to the 3000th Year") is a Japanese manga series written and illustrated by Fumitaka Katō. It was serialized in Kodansha's seinen manga magazine Weekly Young Magazine from December 2020 to November 2021, with its chapters collected in three tankōbon volumes.

== Publication ==
Written and illustrated by Fumitaka Katō, Sanzennenme no Kamitaiō was serialized in Kodansha's seinen manga magazine Weekly Young Magazine from December 21, 2020, to November 22, 2021. Kodansha collected its chapters in three tankōbon volumes, released from June 4, 2021, to February 4, 2022.

In France, the manga has been licensed by Michel Lafon.

=== Volumes ===
No.	Japanese release date	Japanese ISBN
1	June 4, 2021	978-4-06-523662-8
2	October 6, 2021	978-4-06-525097-6
3	February 4, 2022	978-4-06-526822-3
