= Sengoku (manga) =

Japanese manga series

- First tankōbon volume cover

センゴク
- Genre: Epic; Historical
- Manga
- Written by: Hideki Miyashita
- Published by: Kodansha
- Imprint: YMKC Special
- Magazine: Weekly Young Magazine
- Original run: May 3, 2004 – October 22, 2007
- Volumes: 15
- Manga

Sengoku Gaiden Okehazama Senki
- Written by: Hideki Miyashita
- Published by: Kodansha
- Imprint: KC Deluxe, YMKC Special
- Magazine: Bessatsu Young Magazine (2007–2009); Monthly Young Magazine (2009–2010); Weekly Young Magazine (2006–2009)
- Original run: February 16, 2007 – November 15, 2010
- Volumes: 5
- Manga

Sengoku Tenshō-ki
- Written by: Hideki Miyashita
- Published by: Kodansha
- Imprint: YMKC Special
- Magazine: Weekly Young Magazine
- Original run: December 17, 2007 – May 28, 2012
- Volumes: 15
- Manga

Sengoku Ittō-ki
- Written by: Hideki Miyashita
- Published by: Kodansha
- Imprint: YMKC Special
- Magazine: Weekly Young Magazine
- Original run: July 2, 2012 – October 5, 2015
- Volumes: 15
- Manga

Sengoku Gonbe
- Written by: Hideki Miyashita
- Published by: Kodansha
- Imprint: YMKC Special
- Magazine: Weekly Young Magazine
- Original run: November 9, 2015 – February 28, 2022
- Volumes: 27

Sengoku (Japanese: センゴク) is a Japanese manga series written and illustrated by Hideki Miyashita. It was serialized in Kodansha's seinen manga magazine Weekly Young Magazine from May 2004 to October 2007, with its chapters collected in fifteen tankōbon volumes.

Miyashita's manga includes three sequels, Sengoku Tenshō-ki, Sengoku Ittō-ki and Sengoku Gonbe, which were serialized together in the same magazine as the original manga from December 2007 to February 2022, as well as a prequel titled Sengoku Gaiden Okehazama Senki serialized in Kodansha's three magazines, Bessatsu Young Magazine, Monthly Young Magazine, and Weekly Young Magazine from February 2007 to November 2010.

By October 2023, the manga franchise had over 10.59 million copies in circulation.

== Publication ==
Written and illustrated by Hideki Miyashita, Sengoku was serialized in Kodansha's seinen manga magazine Weekly Young Magazine from May 3, 2004, to October 22, 2007. Kodansha collected its chapters in fifteen tankōbon volumes, published from November 3, 2004, to December 28, 2007.

=== Sequels ===
Miyashita published three sequels to his Sengoku manga in the same magazine in three time periods. The first sequel titled Sengoku Tenshō-ki (Note: Japanese: センゴク天正記, Hepburn: Sengoku II) was serialized from December 17, 2007, (Note: It started in the magazine's 3rd issue of 2008 (cover date January 15), which was released on December 17, 2007.) to May 28, 2012. (Note: It finished in the magazine's 26th issue of 2012 (cover date June 11), which was released on May 28.) Kodansha collected its chapters in fifteen volumes, published from April 28, 2008, to October 5, 2012.

the second sequel titled Sengoku Ittō-ki (Note: Japanese: センゴク一統記) was serialized from July 2, 2012, (Note: It started in the magazine's 31st issue of 2012 (cover date July 16), which was released on July 2.) to October 5, 2015. (Note: It finished in the magazine's 45th issue of 2015 (cover date October 19), which was released on October 5.) Kodansha collected its chapters in fifteen volumes, published from October 5, 2012, to March 4, 2016.

the third sequel titled Sengoku Gonbe (Note: Japanese: センゴク権兵衛) was serialized from November 9, 2015, (Note: It started in the magazine's 50th issue of 2015 (cover date November 23), which was released on November 9.) to February 28, 2022. (Note: It finished in the magazine's 13th issue of 2022 (cover date March 14), which was released on February 28.) Kodansha collected its chapters in twenty-seven volumes, published from March 4, 2016, to May 6, 2022.

=== Prequel ===
Miyashita wrote Sengoku Gaiden Okehazama Senki (Note: Japanese: センゴク外伝 桶狭間戦記) a prequel to the original manga, serialized it through Kodansha's three magazines, Bessatsu Young Magazine, Monthly Young Magazine, and Weekly Young Magazine from February 16, 2007, to November 15, 2010. Kodansha collected its chapters in five volumes, published from February 6, 2008, to December 29, 2010. A Special edition released on the same day with final volume.

=== Volumes ===
==== Sengoku ====
No.	Release date	ISBN
1	November 3, 2004	978-4-06-361284-4
2	November 3, 2004	978-4-06-361285-1
3	December 25, 2004	978-4-06-361298-1
4	March 3, 2005	978-4-06-361318-6
5	June 4, 2005	978-4-06-361345-2
6	September 4, 2005	978-4-06-361373-5
7	December 23, 2005	978-4-06-361411-4
8	March 4, 2006	978-4-06-361432-9
9	April 28, 2006	978-4-06-361440-4
10	August 4, 2006	978-4-06-361464-0
11	November 6, 2006	978-4-06-361490-9
12	February 6, 2007	978-4-06-361522-7
13	April 27, 2007	978-4-06-361550-0
14	September 6, 2007	978-4-06-361586-9
15	December 28, 2007	978-4-06-361630-9

==== Sengoku Gaiden Okehazama Senki ====
No.	Release date	ISBN
1	February 6, 2008	978-4-06-361642-2
2	March 06, 2009	978-4-06-375666-1
3	June 4, 2010	978-4-06-375926-6
4	October 6, 2010	978-4-06-375972-3
5	December 29, 2010	978-4-06-376001-9; 978-4-06-362185-3 (SE)

==== Sengoku Tenshō-ki ====
No.	Release date	ISBN
1	April 28, 2008	978-4-06-361665-1
2	August 6, 2008	978-4-06-361710-8
3	November 6, 2008	978-4-06-361734-4
4	March 6, 2009	978-4-06-361766-5
5	May 1, 2009	978-4-06-361787-0
6	August 6, 2009	978-4-06-361814-3
7	November 6, 2009	978-4-06-361836-5
8	March 5, 2010	978-4-06-361873-0
9	June 4, 2010	978-4-06-361899-0
10	April 6, 2011	978-4-06-382019-5
11	August 5, 2011	978-4-06-382061-4
12	November 4, 2011	978-4-06-382105-5
13	February 6, 2012	978-4-06-382130-7
14	May 7, 2012	978-4-06-382169-7
15	October 5, 2012	978-4-06-382223-6

==== Sengoku Ittō-ki ====
No.	Release date	ISBN
1	October 5, 2012	978-4-06-382231-1
2	January 4, 2013	978-4-06-382252-6
3	April 5, 2013	978-4-06-382287-8
4	July 5, 2013	978-4-06-382324-0
5	October 4, 2013	978-4-06-382363-9
6	December 6, 2013	978-4-06-382401-8
7	March 6, 2014	978-4-06-382435-3
8	June 6, 2014	978-4-06-382477-3
9	September 5, 2014	978-4-06-382512-1
10	November 6, 2014	978-4-06-382527-5
11	February 6, 2015	978-4-06-382557-2
12	April 6, 2015	978-4-06-382591-6
13	June 23, 2015	978-4-06-382623-4
14	October 6, 2015	978-4-06-382684-5
15	March 4, 2016	978-4-06-382750-7

==== Sengoku Gonbe ====
No.	Release date	ISBN
1	March 4, 2016	978-4-06-382751-4
2	June 6, 2016	978-4-06-382807-8
3	September 6, 2016	978-4-06-382848-1
4	December 6, 2016	978-4-06-382894-8
5	February 6, 2017	978-4-06-382923-5
6	April 6, 2017	978-4-06-382961-7
7	July 6, 2017	978-4-06-510015-8
8	October 6, 2017	978-4-06-510255-8
9	January 5, 2018	978-4-06-510702-7
10	March 6, 2018	978-4-06-511102-4
11	May 7, 2018	978-4-06-511453-7
12	August 6, 2018	978-4-06-512436-9
13	November 6, 2018	978-4-06-513560-0
14	February 6, 2019	978-4-06-514563-0
15	May 7, 2019	978-4-06-515472-4
16	August 6, 2019	978-4-06-516726-7
17	November 6, 2019	978-4-06-517737-2
18	February 6, 2020	978-4-06-518490-5
19	May 7, 2020	978-4-06-519544-4
20	August 5, 2020	978-4-06-520464-1
21	November 6, 2020	978-4-06-521340-7
22	February 5, 2021	978-4-06-522300-0
23	May 6, 2021	978-4-06-523292-7
24	August 5, 2021	978-4-06-524342-8
25	November 5, 2021	978-4-06-525845-3
26	February 4, 2022	978-4-06-526833-9
27	May 6, 2022	978-4-06-527799-7

== Reception ==
By October 2023, the series and its sequels and prequel combined have 10.59 million copies in circulation. The series was acclaimed by manga authors Hitoshi Iwaaki, said the manga is the best Japanese manga about Sengoku period and described it as a pure historical work without relying on historical legends, and Masami Yuki, considered the manga a great achievement.
