= Guilty Circle =

Japanese manga series

- First tankōbon volume cover

ギルティサークル (Giruti Sākuru)
- Genre: Suspense
- Manga
- Written by: Tsukasa Monma
- Illustrated by: Yammy Yamamoto
- Published by: Kodansha
- Imprint: Shōnen Magazine Comics
- Magazine: Magazine Pocket
- Original run: May 4, 2021 – present
- Volumes: 22

Guilty Circle (ギルティサークル, Giruti Sākuru) is a Japanese manga series written by Tsukasa Monma and illustrated by Yammy Yamamoto. It began serialization on Kodansha's Magazine Pocket website and app in May 2021.

== Plot ==
Doji Sawaya, a first-year student at Seio University, begins college hoping that moving to Tokyo, entering university, and joining a club will help him get a girlfriend. During the spring club recruitment period, he meets Kaede Hoshimi, a beautiful student, and attends a club welcome party with her. After joining the group, Sawaya discovers that the club is hiding a dark side beneath its sociable exterior.

== Publication ==
Written by Tsukasa Monma and illustrated by Yammy Yamamoto, Guilty Circle began serialization on Kodansha's Magazine Pocket website and app on May 4, 2021. Its chapters have been collected into twenty-two tankōbon volumes as of September 2026.

No.	Release date	ISBN
1	September 9, 2021	978-4-06-524833-1
2	December 9, 2021	978-4-06-526273-3
3	March 9, 2022	978-4-06-527264-0
4	June 9, 2022	978-4-06-528165-9
5	September 9, 2022	978-4-06-529090-3
6	December 9, 2022	978-4-06-529949-4
7	March 9, 2023	978-4-06-530916-2
8	June 8, 2023	978-4-06-531878-2
9	September 8, 2023	978-4-06-532883-5
10	November 9, 2023	978-4-06-533503-1
11	February 8, 2024	978-4-06-534545-0
12	May 9, 2024	978-4-06-535502-2
13	August 7, 2024	978-4-06-536512-0
14	November 8, 2024	978-4-06-537424-5
15	February 7, 2025	978-4-06-538411-4
16	May 9, 2025	978-4-06-539457-1
17	August 7, 2025	978-4-06-540363-1
18	November 7, 2025	978-4-06-540363-1
19	February 9, 2026	978-4-06-542618-0
20	May 8, 2026	978-4-06-543621-9
21	August 7, 2026	978-4-06-544649-2
22	September 9, 2026	978-4-06-544965-3

== See also ==
- Manchuria Opium Squad, another manga series by the same writer
