= Go to Go =

Japanese manga series

- First tankōbon volume cover

伍と碁
- Genre: Sports
- Manga
- Written by: Tōto Hasuo
- Illustrated by: Haruka Nakazato
- Published by: Kodansha
- Imprint: Young Magazine KC
- Magazine: Weekly Young Magazine
- Original run: January 27, 2025 – present
- Volumes: 8

Go to Go (Japanese: 伍と碁; lit. 'Five and Go') is a Japanese manga series written by Tōto Hasui and illustrated by Haruka Nakazato. It began serialization in Kodansha's seinen manga magazine Weekly Young Magazine in January 2025.

== Synopsis ==
Kosei Akiyama was a child prodigy who excelled at sports and academics in elementary school. One day while in sixth grade, he discovers Go and decides to join a class for it. However, Kosei suffers defeats at the hands of his five classmates which forces him to quit. Later in high school, he rediscovers Go and vows to regain his passion and take revenge on his ex-classmates.

== Publication ==
Written by Tōto Hasuo and illustrated by Haruka Nakazato, Go to Go began serialization in Kodansha's seinen manga magazine Weekly Young Magazine on January 27, 2025. Its chapters have been compiled into eight tankōbon volumes as of October 2026.

No.	Release date	ISBN
1	May 7, 2025	978-4-06-538729-0
2	July 4, 2025	978-4-06-540176-7
3	October 6, 2025	978-4-06-541141-4
4	December 6, 2025	978-4-06-541764-5
5	March 6, 2026	978-4-06-542882-5
6	June 5, 2026	978-4-06-543830-5
7	August 6, 2026	978-4-06-544497-9
8	October 6, 2026	978-4-06-545207-3

== Reception ==
The series was ranked 14th in the seventh Sanyodo Bookstore Comic Awards in 2026.
