= Zeikin de Katta Hon =

Japanese manga series

- First tankōbon volume cover

税金で買った本
- Genre: Comedy
- Manga
- Written by: Zuino
- Illustrated by: Kei Keiyama
- Published by: Kodansha
- Imprint: Young Magazine KC Special
- Magazine: YanMaga Web (2021); Weekly Young Magazine (2021–present)
- Original run: August 16, 2021 – present
- Volumes: 21
- Television drama
- Directed by: Hiroyuki Muramatsu; Tomoki Sakanashi
- Written by: Riko Sakaguchi
- Music by: Kei Yoshikawa
- Studio: NHK Enterprises
- Original network: NHK General TV
- Original run: August 24, 2026 – October 15, 2026
- Episodes: 32
- Anime television series
- icon

Zeikin de Katta Hon (税金で買った本; lit. 'Books Bought with Taxes') is a Japanese manga series written by Zuino and illustrated by Kei Keiyama. It started in Kodansha's online platform YanMaga Web in August 2021, and was later transferred to the publisher's manga magazine Weekly Young Magazine in December of that same year. A 32-episode live-action television drama adaptation aired from August to October 2026, and an anime television series adaptation has been announced.

== Plot ==
The story follows Ishidaira, an unruly student who, after discovering a love of books, comes to work at a library. Along with his senior coworkers Hayasemaru and Shirai, he solves problems such as damaged books and the mysteries behind them.

== Characters ==
Kiichi Ishidaira (石平 紀一, Ishidaira Kiichi)
Portrayed by: Daiken Okudaira
A high-schooler, whose delinquency and belligerent attitude belies his natural inquisitiveness and love of learning. Eventually comes to work part-time at the library.
Sayaka Hayasemaru (早瀬丸 小夜香, Hayasemaru Sayaka)
Portrayed by: Nanase Nishino
A librarian, who sets down Ishidaira on a path to (re)discovering his love of reading by prompting him to reimburse a borrowed book he had lost. She is passionate about her work and acts as Ishidaira's (and by proxy, the reader's) guide to the inner workings of a public library.
Satoyuki Shirai (白井 里雪, Shirai Satoyuki)
Portrayed by: Macho Aoki (Kakeochi)
Another librarian, who works closely with Hayasemaru. Originally physically weak, he bulked up in order to better respond to threats and complaints towards the library and his co-workers. His assertiveness is often utilized to deal with uncooperative patrons.
Asako Asano (朝野 亜沙子, Asano Asako)
Portrayed by: Sayaka Isoyama
Hotta (堀田)
Portrayed by: Akira Kawashima (Kirin)
Kiichi's father (紀一の父, Kiichi no Chichi)
Portrayed by: Hiroyuki Hirayama
Ryoko Ishidaira (石平 りょうこ, Ishidaira Ryoko)
Portrayed by: Akiko Yada

== Media ==
=== Manga ===
Written by Zuino and illustrated by Kei Keiyama, Zeikin de Katta Hon started in Kodansha's online platform YanMaga Web on August 16, 2021. The series was later transferred to the publisher's manga magazine Weekly Young Magazine on December 13 of that same year. Kodansha has collected its chapters into individual tankōbon volumes. The first volume was released on December 20, 2021. As of October 6, 2026, twenty-one volumes have been released.

An official guidebook was released on May 6, 2023.

==== Volumes ====
No.	Japanese release date	Japanese ISBN
1	December 20, 2021	978-4-06-526168-2
2	March 4, 2022	978-4-06-527113-1
3	June 6, 2022	978-4-06-528104-8
4	September 6, 2022	978-4-06-529118-4
5	December 6, 2022	978-4-06-530054-1
6	March 6, 2023	978-4-06-530709-0
7	May 8, 2023	978-4-06-531639-9
8	August 4, 2023	978-4-06-532248-2
9	November 6, 2023	978-4-06-533638-0
10	February 6, 2024	978-4-06-534610-5
11	May 7, 2024	978-4-06-535589-3
12	August 6, 2024	978-4-06-536545-8
13	November 6, 2024	978-4-06-537451-1
14	February 6, 2025	978-4-06-538459-6
15	May 7, 2025	978-4-06-539622-3
16	August 6, 2025	978-4-06-540528-4
17	November 6, 2025	978-4-06-541404-0
18	February 6, 2026	978-4-06-542528-2
19	May 1, 2026	978-4-06-543531-1
20	August 6, 2026	978-4-06-544465-8
21	October 6, 2026	978-4-06-545006-2

=== Drama ===
A live-action television drama adaptation was announced on February 28, 2026. The series was directed by Hiroyuki Muramatsu and Tomoki Sakanashi, with Riko Sakaguchi writing the scripts and Kei Yoshikawa composing the music. It aired for 32 episodes on NHK General TV's Yoru Dra (Evening Drama) programming block from August 24 to October 15, 2026.

=== Anime ===
An anime television series adaptation was also announced on February 28, 2026.

== Reception ==
The manga was nominated for the sixth Takao Saito Award in 2022. The series ranked 49th on the 2022 "Book of the Year" list by Da Vinci magazine; it ranked tenth on the 2023 list. It ranked ninth in the Nationwide Bookstore Employees' Recommended Comics of 2023.
