= Lili-Men =

Japanese manga series

- First tankōbon volume cover
- Genre: Action; Fantasy
- Manga
- Written by: Takuma Tokashiki
- Published by: Kodansha
- English publisher: Kodansha
- Imprint: Young Magazine KC
- Magazine: Weekly Young Magazine; (September 12, 2022–September 9, 2024); YanMaga Web; (September 28, 2024–March 14, 2026)
- Original run: September 12, 2022 – March 14, 2026
- Volumes: 13

Lili-Men (stylized in all caps) is a Japanese manga series written and illustrated by Takuma Tokashiki. It initially began serialization in Kodansha's seinen manga magazine Weekly Young Magazine in September 2022. It was later transferred to the YanMaga Web manga website in September 2024, where it ran until March 2026.

== Plot ==
A race called "Succubi" reproduces by using humans as fertile hosts, while humans, in turn, seek to eradicate them. After a long time, as these two incompatible races begin to clash, a "King" is born—destined to bring the war to an end.

The protagonist, Nito, has lived in a detention facility since childhood and is considered a failure among his peers because he cannot achieve good results in the tests. In reality, this facility is an institution used by the succubi to feed on humans and to turn those who "leave the structure" into fertile hosts for them.

All of Nito's friends are used for this purpose, and when he discovers the truth, he is attacked by a succubus and mortally wounded. However, he manages to gather his remaining strength, enters an egg that has grown behind the facility, and absorbs all its power—awakening as a being that is neither human nor succubus.

Having narrowly escaped death, he manages to flee into the outside world with the help of a mysterious woman named Hiiro, who had been hiding within the facility. In that new world, he gradually begins to claim the "normal life" he was never able to live before.

== Publication ==
Written and illustrated by Takuma Tokashiki, Lili-Men was initially serialized in Kodansha's seinen manga magazine Weekly Young Magazine from September 12, 2022, to September 9, 2024. It was later transferred to the YanMaga Web website on September 28, 2024, and ended serialization on March 14, 2026. Its chapters were compiled into thirteen tankōbon volumes released from January 6, 2023, to June 19, 2026.

The series' chapters are simultaneously published in English on Kodansha's K Manga app.

No.	Release date	ISBN
1	January 6, 2023	978-4-06-530397-9
2	March 6, 2023	978-4-06-531055-7
3	June 6, 2023	978-4-06-532034-1
4	August 4, 2023	978-4-06-532632-9
5	December 6, 2023	978-4-06-534102-5
6	March 6, 2024	978-4-06-534913-7
7	June 6, 2024	978-4-06-535822-1
8	September 5, 2024	978-4-06-536874-9
9	January 20, 2025	978-4-06-538298-1
10	May 20, 2025	978-4-06-539626-1
11	September 19, 2025	978-4-06-540973-2
12	January 20, 2026	978-4-06-542156-7
13	June 19, 2026	978-4-06-543824-4

== Reception ==
The first volume received recommendations from manga creators Hiroya Oku, ONE, Hideo Yamamoto, Kazu Inabe and visual artist Kōji Tajima.
