= Boys Run the Riot =

Japanese manga series by Keito Gaku

- Cover of the first tankōbon volume, featuring Ryo Watari

ボーイズ・ラン・ザ・ライオット (Bōizu Ran za Raiotto)
- Genre: Coming-of-age
- Manga
- Written by: Keito Gaku
- Published by: Kodansha
- English publisher: NA: Kodansha USA
- Magazine: Weekly Young Magazine; (January 27 – August 31, 2020); Comic Days; (September 9 – October 14, 2020)
- Original run: January 27, 2020 – October 14, 2020
- Volumes: 4

Boys Run the Riot (Japanese: ボーイズ・ラン・ザ・ライオット, Hepburn: Bōizu Ran za Raiotto) is a Japanese manga series written and illustrated by Keito Gaku. The story follows the struggles of a transgender high school boy who launches a fashion brand with his friends. The manga was first serialized in Kodansha's seinen manga magazine Weekly Young Magazine from January to August 2020. It was then transferred to Kodansha's Comic Days manga app, where it ran from September to October 2020. Its chapters were collected in four tankōbon volumes. The manga is licensed in English by Kodansha USA, who hired an all-transgender localization team to edit and translate the manga.

== Plot ==
Boys Run the Riot follows a transgender high school boy named Ryo Watari (渡 凌, Watari Ryō) and his struggles in a school setting that does not accept his gender. His interest in men's street fashion leads to him to befriend Jin Sato (佐藤 迅, Satō Jin), a cisgender boy and transfer student who is also an outcast, despite Ryo's initial doubts about him. After Ryo confides in Jin about his gender dysphoria, they decide together to launch their own fashion brand, which they name "Boys Run the Riot".

== Publication ==
Boys Run the Riot was written and illustrated by Keito Gaku, a transgender man. It was first serialized in Kodansha's seinen manga magazine Weekly Young Magazine from January 27 to August 31, 2020. It was then transferred to Kodansha's Comic Days manga app, where it ran from September 9 to October 14, 2020. Kodansha collected its 37 chapters in four tankōbon volumes, released from July 6, 2020, to February 5, 2021.

In North America, Kodansha USA announced the English-language release of Boys Run the Riot in November 2020. The company hired an all-transgender localization team to edit and translate the manga. Kodansha USA also commissioned Keito Gaku to draw new cover art for the second, third, and fourth volumes. The first chapter of Boys Run the Riot was released for free online on March 31, 2021, in honor of International Transgender Day of Visibility. The first volume was published two months later on May 25, 2021, featuring an alternate cover from the Japanese edition. The fourth and final volume was published digitally on November 30, 2021, and in print on January 18, 2022.

=== Volumes ===
| No. | Original release date | Original ISBN | English release date | English ISBN |
|---|---|---|---|---|
| 1 | July 6, 2020 | 978-4-06-519996-1 | May 25, 2021 | 978-1-64651-248-5 |
1. "Encounter"; 2. "Liar"; 3. "Shame"; 4. "Moderately"; 5. "Sneer"; 6. "Collapse"; 7. "Riot"
| 2 | September 4, 2020 | 978-4-06-520685-0 | July 27, 2021 | 978-1-64651-117-4 |
8. "Attack"; 9. "Restart"; 10. "Subtle"; 11. "Express"; 12. "Simple Is Best"; 13. "Awkward"; 14. "Tough"; 15. "Proof"; 16. "Dive"
| 3 | December 4, 2020 | 978-4-06-521708-5 | October 5, 2021 | 978-1-64651-119-8 |
17. "Stare"; 18. "Extort"; 19. "Growing Apart"; 20. "Indebtedness"; 21. "Border"; 22. "Revolution"; 23. "Scandal"; 24. "Betrayal"; 25. "Irresponsible"; 26. "Character"
| 4 | February 5, 2021 | 978-4-06-522297-3 | November 30, 2021 (digital); January 18, 2022 (print) | 978-1-64651-121-1 |
27. "Play"; 28. "Gift"; 29. "Loser"; 30. "Master"; 31. "Concept"; 32. "Renovate"; 33. "Motif"; 34. "Step by Step"; 35. "Presence"; 36. "My Way"; 37. "Freedom"

== Reception ==
Boys Run the Riot was nominated for a Harvey Award in the Best Manga category in 2021. The School Library Journal listed the first volume of Boys Run the Riot as one of the top 10 manga of 2021, while YALSA listed the first three volumes in its 2022 Great Graphic Novels for Teens Top Ten list. The first volume appeared on the 2022 Bank Street Children's Book Committee's Best Books of the Year List.
