= Saltiness (manga) =

Japanese manga series

- First tankōbon volume cover

サルチネス (Saruchinesu)
- Genre: Comedy
- Manga
- Written by: Minoru Furuya
- Published by: Kodansha
- Magazine: Weekly Young Magazine
- Original run: May 28, 2012 – July 13, 2013
- Volumes: 4
- icon

Saltiness (Japanese: サルチネス, Hepburn: Saruchinesu) is a Japanese manga series written and illustrated by Minoru Furuya. It was serialized in Kodansha's seinen manga magazine Weekly Young Magazine from May 2012 to July 2013, with its chapters collected in four tankōbon volumes.

== Plot ==
31-year-old Takehiko Nakamaru has spent most of his life as a NEET and a local eccentric, residing with his more well-adjusted sister, Ai, and their grandfather in the countryside. When their grandfather expresses concern that Takehiko's dependence on the family might prevent Ai from finding a husband and starting a family, Takehiko sneaks out and hitchhikes to Tokyo, determined to become independent.

== Publication ==
Written and illustrated by Minoru Furuya, Wanitokagegisu was serialized in Kodansha's seinen manga magazine Weekly Young Magazine from May 28, 2012, to July 13, 2013. Kodansha collected its chapters in four tankōbon volumes, released from September 6, 2012, to September 6, 2013.

=== Volumes ===
| No. | Release date | ISBN |
|---|---|---|
| 1 | September 6, 2012 | 978-4-06-382219-9 |
| 2 | February 6, 2013 | 978-4-06-382265-6 |
| 3 | July 5, 2013 | 978-4-06-382326-4 |
| 4 | September 6, 2013 | 978-4-06-382350-9 |

== Reception ==
The manga was nominated for the 46th Angoulême International Comics Festival in the Best Comic category in 2019. It was nominated for the 2019 ACBD's Prix Asie de la Critique.
