= Ciguatera (manga) =

Japanese manga series

- First tankōbon volume cover

シガテラ (Shigatera)
- Genre: Coming-of-age; Romance
- Manga
- Written by: Minoru Furuya
- Published by: Kodansha
- English publisher: NA: Vertical
- Magazine: Weekly Young Magazine
- Original run: July 14, 2003 – June 6, 2005
- Volumes: 6
- icon

Ciguatera (Japanese: シガテラ, Hepburn: Shigatera) is a Japanese manga series written and illustrated by Minoru Furuya. It was serialized in Kodansha's seinen manga magazine Weekly Young Magazine from July 2003 to June 2005, with its chapters collected in six tankōbon volumes.

== Media ==
=== Manga ===
Written and illustrated by Minoru Furuya, Ciguatera was serialized in Kodansha's seinen manga magazine Weekly Young Magazine from July 14, 2003, (Note: It debuted in the magazine's 33rd issue of 2003, released on July 14 of the same year.) to June 6, 2005. (Note: It finished in the magazine's 27th issue of 2005, released on June 6 of the same year.) Kodansha collected its chapters in six tankōbon volumes, released from December 25, 2003, to August 5, 2005.

In North America, the manga was licensed for English release by Kodansha USA (as a Vertical title) published it in a three-volume omnibus edition, released from November 9, 2021, to July 12, 2022.

==== Volumes ====
No.	Original release date	Original ISBN	English release date	English ISBN
1	December 25, 2003	978-4-06-361193-9	November 9, 2021	978-1-63699-450-5
2	April 6, 2004	978-4-06-361226-4	November 9, 2021	978-1-63699-450-5
3	September 6, 2004	978-4-06-361255-4	May 10, 2022	978-1-63699-589-2
4	February 4, 2005	978-4-06-361309-4	May 10, 2022	978-1-63699-589-2
5	April 30, 2005	978-4-06-361334-6	July 12, 2022	978-1-68491-102-8
6	August 5, 2005	978-4-06-361361-2	July 12, 2022	978-1-68491-102-8

=== Drama ===
In March 2023, it was announced that the series would receive a television drama adaptation, directed by Masataka Hayashi, Yū Inose, Takahiro Takasugi, and Yōsuke Nakamura, with scripts by Yōsuke Masaike, and premiered on TV Tokyo's "Drama 24" block on April 7 of the same year. It stars Kotaro Daigo as Yusuke Ogino and Nagisa Sekimizu as Yumi Nagumo.

== Reception ==
Ciguatera was one of the Jury Recommended Works at the 8th and 9th Japan Media Arts Festival in 2004 and 2005, respectively.
