= Bataashi Kingyo =

Japanese manga series

- First tankōbon volume cover

バタアシ金魚
- Manga
- Written by: Minetarō Mochizuki
- Published by: Kodansha
- Imprint: Yanmaga KC Special
- Magazine: Weekly Young Magazine
- Original run: 1985 – 1988
- Volumes: 6
- Live-action film
- Directed by: Joji Matsuoka
- Produced by: Haruo Umekawa
- Written by: Joji Matsuoka
- Music by: Masamichi Shigeno
- Studio: Nippon Victor
- Released: June 2, 1990
- Runtime: 95 minutes

Bataashi Kingyo (バタアシ金魚; "Flutter Kick Goldfish") is a Japanese manga series written and illustrated by Minetarō Mochizuki. It was serialized in Kodansha's seinen manga magazine Weekly Young Magazine from 1985 to 1988. A live-action film adaptation, directed by Joji Matsuoka, premiered in June 1990.

== Media ==
=== Manga ===
Written and illustrated by Minetarō Mochizuki, Bataashi Kingyo was serialized in Kodansha's seinen manga magazine Weekly Young Magazine from 1985 to 1988. Kodansha collected its chapters in six tankōbon volumes, released from May 15, 1986, to September 12, 1988.

=== Live-action film ===
A live-action film adaptation, directed by Joji Matsuoka, and starring Michitaka Tsutsui Saki Takaoka, Kazuko Shirakawa and Azuma Mikihisa, premiered on June 2, 1990.

== Reception ==
The film was chosen as the third-best film at the 12th Yokohama Film Festival. Joji Matsuoka won the Award for Best New Director, Saki Takaoka won the award for Best Newcomer and Norimichi Kasamatsu won the award for Best Cinematography.
