= Hauntress =

Japanese manga series

- Tankōbon volume cover

座敷女 (Zashiki Onna)
- Genre: Psychological horror
- Manga
- Written by: Minetarō Mochizuki
- Published by: Kodansha
- English publisher: NA: Kodansha USA
- Magazine: Weekly Young Magazine
- Published: 1993
- Volumes: 1
- icon

Hauntress (Japanese: 座敷女, Hepburn: Zashiki Onna; "Phantom Stalker Woman") is a Japanese manga series written and illustrated by Minetarō Mochizuki. It was serialized in Kodansha's seinen manga magazine Weekly Young Magazine in 1993, with its chapters collected in a single tankōbon volume.

== Publication ==
Written and illustrated by Minetarō Mochizuki, Hauntress was serialized in Kodansha's seinen manga magazine Weekly Young Magazine in 1993. Kodansha collected its chapters in a single tankōbon volume released on July 6 of that same year.

In July 2024, Kodansha USA announced that it had licensed the manga for English release in North America, with one volume releasing on February 25, 2025.

== Reception ==
The series ranked ninth on the "Most Traumatizing Manga" poll conducted by Japanese website Goo Ranking in 2015; it ranked eleventh on the "Horror Manga To Keep You Up at Night" poll conducted by the same website in 2018.
