= Imōto wa Shitte Iru =

Japanese manga series

- First tankōbon volume cover

妹は知っている
- Genre: Comedy
- Manga
- Written by: Mari Gangi
- Published by: Kodansha
- Imprint: Young Magazine KC Special
- Magazine: Weekly Young Magazine
- Original run: November 25, 2024 – present
- Volumes: 9
- icon

Imōto wa Shitte Iru (妹は知っている; lit. 'My Little Sister Knows') is a Japanese manga series written and illustrated by Mari Gangi. It began serialization in Kodansha's Weekly Young Magazine in November 2024, and has been compiled into nine volumes as of October 2026.

== Plot ==
The series follows Kiichirō Miki, a salaryman who lives with his younger sister Miki. Despite having a boring personality in real life, he is secretly Fruit Parfait, a radio listener known for frequently sending detailed postcards to the program All Night Nippon. However, only Miki is aware of his secret identity.

== Characters ==
Kiichirō Miki (三木 貴一郎, Miki Kiichirō)
A 26-year-old salaryman who works as a system engineer. His alternate persona as Fruit Parfait is well-known among radio listeners, although only his younger sister Miki is aware of his identity. He was born Kiichirō Makabe (真壁 貴一郎, Makabe Kiichirō), but adopted his mother's maiden family name Miki after she divorced their father. He became closer to Miki after appearing with her in a variety show, substituting for one of Miki's idol groupmates. He cares deeply for Miki, to the point he gets angry when others criticize her.
Miki Miki (三木 美貴)
Kiichirō's younger sister and a member of the idol group xoxo (pronounced "Kiss Kiss"). She is known for her cold personality, but she cares deeply about Kiichirō, to the point she can even see his true emotions. She often appears in variety shows, particularly after her appearance with Kiichirō. She was born Miki Makabe (真壁 美貴, Makabe Miki); despite the initial hesitation of her mother as it would mean Miki would have the same first and last name, she decided to adopt the surname Miki after their parents' divorce.
Sumine Hirose (広瀬 澄音, Hirose Sumine)
Kiichirō's co-worker and friend, who is popular among their male co-workers. She previously had a boyfriend, but they broke up following an argument.
Tsubomi Yokō (横尾 蕾, Yokō Tsubomi)
Kiichirō's co-worker and an accounting manager. As she is 34 years old, others jokingly refer to her as an "old lady". Like Kiichirō, she is an avid radio listener and also often sends postcard to programs, although she has not had any success in being acknowledged on-air. She is initially unfamiliar with Kiichirō's identity as Fruit Parfait, although she later finds out after a certain incident.
Akari (あかり)
An idol who belongs to the same group as Miki. She was supposed to appear on the same variety program as Miki, but because she was unavailable, Kiichirō substituted for her at the last minute.

== Publication ==
The series is written and illustrated by Mari Gangi. It began serialization in Kodansha's Weekly Young Magazine on November 25, 2024. Gangi created the series as they found the concept of "postcard craftsmen", people who create detailed postcards to send to radio programs, interesting. She originally aimed for the Miki siblings to have a more cheerful personality, but changed them to have a more reserved personality at the suggestion of her editor. The first tankōbon volume was released on March 6, 2025; nine volumes have been released as of October 2026.

No.	Release date	ISBN
1	March 6, 2025	978-4-06-538788-7
2	June 6, 2025	978-4-06-539948-4
3	August 6, 2025	978-4-06-540537-6
4	October 6, 2025	978-4-06-541138-4
5	December 5, 2025	978-4-06-541763-8
6	March 6, 2026	978-4-06-542883-2
7	June 5, 2026	978-4-06-543828-2
8	August 6, 2026	978-4-06-544527-3
9	October 6, 2026	978-4-06-545205-9

== Reception ==
The series was nominated for the 2025 Next Manga Award in the print category, and was ranked thirteenth. The series was nominated for the 19th Manga Taishō in 2026, and was ranked twelfth.

The series received attention online for its discussion on postcard craftsmen, with a tweet promoting the series getting over 50,000 likes on Twitter. Volume one received a reprint a few days after release due to high demand.
