= Kōgyō Aika Volley Boys =

Japanese manga series

- Cover of the first tankōbon volume

工業哀歌バレーボーイズ (Kōgyō Aika Barē Bōizu)
- Genre: Comedy; Coming-of-age; Sports
- Manga
- Written by: Hiroyuki Murata
- Published by: Kodansha
- Magazine: Weekly Young Magazine
- Original run: 1989 – 2006
- Volumes: 50
- Original video animation
- Directed by: Kunihiko Yuyama
- Written by: Hiroshi Toda
- Music by: Tsuneyoshi Saito
- Studio: J.C.Staff
- Released: March 17, 1997 – April 25, 1997
- Runtime: 50 minutes
- Episodes: 2
- Manga

Kōshoku Aika Volley Boys
- Written by: Hiroyuki Murata
- Published by: Kodansha
- Magazine: Weekly Young Magazine
- Original run: 2006 – 2011
- Volumes: 17
- Live-action film
- Directed by: Kōmei
- Written by: Shōichirō Masumoto
- Released: November 22, 2008
- Runtime: 89 minutes
- icon

Kōgyō Aika Volley Boys (Japanese: 工業哀歌バレーボーイズ, Hepburn: Kōgyō Aika Barē Bōizu) is a Japanese manga series written and illustrated by Hiroyuki Murata. It was serialized in Kodansha's seinen manga magazine Weekly Young Magazine from 1989 to 2006, with its chapters collected in 50 tankōbon volumes. A sequel, Kōshoku Aika Volley Boys, was serialized in the same magazine from 2006 to 2011, with its chapters collected in 17 tankōbon volumes. It was adapted into a two-episode original video animation (OVA) in 1997, a three-episode drama video in 2006 and a live-action film in 2008.

== Media ==
=== Manga ===
Written and illustrated by Hiroyuki Murata, Kōgyō Aika Volley Boys was serialized in Kodansha's seinen manga magazine Weekly Young Magazine from 1989 to 2006. Kodansha collected its chapters in fifty tankōbon volumes, released from July 17, 1989, to April 6, 2006.

A sequel, titled Kōshoku Aika Volley Boys (好色哀歌 元バレーボーイズ, Kōshoku Aika Barē Bōizu), was serialized in the same magazine from 2006 to 2011. Its chapters were collected in seventeen tankōbon volumes, released from August 4, 2006, to July 6, 2011.

=== Original video animation ===
A two-episode original video animation, animated by J.C.Staff and distributed Toho, was released in 1997.

=== Live-action ===
The series was adapted into a three-episode live-action drama video in 2006. A live-action film adaptation premiered on November 22, 2008.

== Reception ==
By February 2021, the manga had over 12 million copies in circulation.
