= Cherry Nights =

Japanese manga series

- Cover of the first volume of manga.

チェリーナイツ
- Genre: Comedy
- Manga
- Written by: Dragon Odawara
- Published by: Kodansha
- Magazine: Weekly Young Magazine
- Original run: 2005 – 2011
- Volumes: 10
- Television drama
- Original network: BS Fuji
- Original run: October 10, 2010 – December 12, 2010
- Episodes: 8
- Manga

Wild Cherry Nights
- Written by: Dragon Odawara
- Published by: Kodansha
- Magazine: Weekly Young Magazine
- Original run: 2011 – 2012
- Volumes: 2
- Manga

Cherry Nights R
- Written by: Dragon Odawara
- Published by: Kodansha
- Magazine: Weekly Young Magazine
- Original run: 2012 – 2014

Cherry Nights (チェリーナイツ) is a Japanese manga series by Dragon Odawara. It ran from 2005 to 2011. It has since been followed by two sequels Wild Cherry Nights and Cherry Nights R.

It was adapted into a live action television drama series in 2010.

== Manga ==
Cherry Nights is written and illustrated by Dragon Odawara. It was serialized in Weekly Young Magazine from 2005 to 2011. A sequel Wild Cherry Nights was serialized from 2011 to 2012. A third series, Cherry Nights R was serialized from 2012 to 2014.

=== Volume list ===
==== Cherry Nights ====
| No. | Release date | ISBN |
|---|---|---|
| 01 | February 3, 2006 | 978-4-06-361419-0 |
| 02 | April 6, 2007 | 978-4-06-361547-0 |
| 03 | July 4, 2008 | 978-4-06-361698-9 |
| 04 | April 6, 2009 | 978-4-06-361767-2 |
| 05 | October 6, 2009 | 978-4-06-361826-6 |
| 06 | October 6, 2010 | 978-4-06-361923-2 |
| 07 | November 5, 2010 | 978-4-06-361960-7 |
| 08 | February 4, 2011 | 978-4-06-361995-9 |
| 09 | July 6, 2011 | 978-4-06-382049-2 |
| 10 | November 4, 2011 | 978-4-06-382096-6 |

==== Wild Cherry Nights ====
| No. | Release date | ISBN |
|---|---|---|
| 01 | April 6, 2012 | 978-4-06-382165-9 |
| 02 | October 5, 2012 | 978-4-06-382230-4 |
