= Himizu (film) =

2011 film

- Film poster advertising this film in Japan
- Directed by: Sion Sono
- Written by: Minoru Furuya (manga); Sion Sono (screenplay)
- Based on: Himizu by Minoru Furuya
- Produced by: Haruo Umekawa; Masashi Yamazaki
- Starring: Shōta Sometani; Fumi Nikaidō
- Cinematography: Sohei Tanikawa
- Edited by: Jun'ichi Itô
- Music by: Tomohide Harada
- Production companies: Gaga; Kodansha; Studio Three Co., Ltd.
- Distributed by: Gaga
- Release dates: 5 September 2011 (Venice); 14 January 2012 (Japan)
- Running time: 130 minutes
- Country: Japan
- Language: Japanese

Himizu (Japanese: ヒミズ) is 2011 Japanese drama film based on the manga series of the same name by Minoru Furuya and directed by Sion Sono. The word himizu is the Japanese name for a species of mole. The film competed in competition at the 68th Venice International Film Festival in September. At the festival, Shōta Sometani and Fumi Nikaidō received the Marcello Mastroianni Award for Best New Young Actor and Actress for their work in the film.

== Cast ==
- Shōta Sometani as Yuichi Sumida
- Fumi Nikaidō as Keiko Shazawa
- Megumi Kagurazaka
- Asuka Kurosawa
- Denden
- Mitsuru Fukikoshi
- Tetsu Watanabe
- Makiko Watanabe
- Ken Mitsuishi
- Jun Murakami
- Yōsuke Kubozuka as Teruhiko
- Yuriko Yoshitaka as Miki
- Takahiro Nishijima as You
- Anne Suzuki as Waitress

== Production ==
=== Development ===
The director Sion Sono had already written the film's script when the Tōhoku earthquake and tsunami struck Japan on 11 March 2011. After this disaster, he decided to rewrite the script to adapt the film to this disaster.

=== Casting ===
The lead stars of the film were officially announced on 10 June 2011. The lead actor for the film is Shōta Sometani, who plays the role of Sumida, a 15-year-old who suffers from the violence that his father inflicted onto him. Actress Fumi Nikaidō his co-star, plays Chazawa, a rich girl who is Sumida's classmate.

Additional cast members of the film are Yōsuke Kubozuka, Yuriko Yoshitaka, Anne Suzuki and singer Takahiro Nishijima. Actress Yoshitaka previously starred in the 2006 film Noriko's Dinner Table, which was also directed by Sion Sono. Nishijima is from the music group AAA, and also previously starred in Sion Sono's 2009 award-winning film Love Exposure.

=== Filming ===
Most of the filming took place at a special set in Ibaraki Prefecture during May 2011.

== Reception ==
=== Critical reception ===
Himizu currently holds a 94% approval rating on Rotten Tomatoes. The film was a New York Times Critics' Pick, with Miriam Bale praising its sound design and noting Sono "uses sound, a low, grumbling noise like an earthquake, to convey [dystopian Japan]. He also gives the film a harrowing cacophony and a sense of trauma with sound effects, including subtle echoes." Deborah Young of The Hollywood Reporter criticized the film as being "fraught with brutal violence and needless repetition that draws out its two-hour running time" and added that the film "is still not an easy film to like". However, the reviewer praised the ending of the film, which she describes as "achingly real" and "extraordinarily intense and effective". She also praised the film's young leads Shōta Sometani and Fumi Nikaidō, who she said "grow in stature as the film progresses".

=== Accolades ===
Year	Award	Category	Result	Recipient
2011	68th Venice International Film Festival	Marcello Mastroianni Award	Won	Shōta Sometani and Fumi Nikaidō

== Charleston church shooting ==
Quoting the line "Even if my life is worth less than a speck of dirt, I want to use it for the good of society" in his manifesto "The Last Rhodesian," Dylann Roof, the man who carried out the Charleston church shooting on 17 June 2015, identified Himizu as his "favorite film."
