= Weekly Young Magazine =

Japanese manga magazine

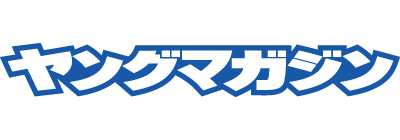

- Cover of the 13th issue of Weekly Young Magazine in 2014, published by Kodansha on March 10, 2014, featuring Yuki Kashiwagi of the pop group AKB48
- Editor-in-Chief: Kazushi Suzuki
- Categories: Seinen manga
- Frequency: Biweekly (1980–1989); Weekly (since 1989)
- Circulation: 127,500; (July–September 2026)
- First issue: June 16, 1980
- Company: Kodansha
- Country: Japan
- Based in: Tokyo
- Language: Japanese
- Website: Official website

Weekly Young Magazine (Japanese: 週刊ヤングマガジン, Hepburn: Shūkan Yangu Magajin) is a Japanese weekly anthology magazine published in Tokyo each Monday by Kodansha. The magazine started on June 16, 1980, and is targeted at the adult male (seinen) demographic. It was published biweekly under the title Young Magazine (ヤングマガジン, Yangu Magajin), on the second and fourth Mondays of every month, until switching to a weekly publication in April 1989. The chapters of the series that run in Weekly Young Magazine are collected and published in tankōbon volumes under the "YoungKC" imprint every four months. The magazine usually features color photos of pinup girl gravure idols on the cover and first few pages of each issue.

Since December 9, 2009, Kodansha has published a monthly sister magazine, Monthly Young Magazine (月刊ヤングマガジン, Gekkan Yangu Magajin), a retitled makeover of their previous publication Bessatsu Young Magazine (別冊ヤングマガジン, Bessatsu Yangu Magajin), which had published a total of 36 bimonthly issues during its existence.

== Series in publication ==
There are currently 35 manga titles serialized in Weekly Young Magazine. Out of them, Seven Shakespeares: Non Sanz Droict, Kenka Kagyō, and Tobaku Datenroku Kaiji: 24-oku Dasshutsu-hen are on hiatus.

Series Title	Author	Premiered
1-nichi Gaishutsuroku Hanchō (1日外出録ハンチョウ)	Tensei Hagiwara, Motomu Uehara, Kazuya Arai	December 2016
Amateur Vigilante (アマチュアビジランテ, Amachua Bijirante)	Sōhei Asamura, Kōtarō Naitō	June 2024
Ari to Hachi (蟻と蜂)	Kaito Shimizu, Edogawa Edogawa	July 2026
Bōryoku Banzai (暴力万歳)	Homura Kawamoto, Nadainishi	March 2025
Chainsmoker Cat (ヤニねこ, Yani Neko)	NyanNyanFactory	February 2023
Dare Demo Dakeru Kimi ga Suki (だれでも抱けるキミが好き)	Super Takeda	April 2023
Go to Go (伍と碁)	Tōto Hasuo, Haruna Nakazato	January 2025
Golden Drop (ゴールデンドロップ, Gōruden Doroppu)	Keiichi Tsuha, Ryō Kōzuki	May 2023
Heisei Haizanhei Sumire-chan (平成敗残兵☆すみれちゃん)	Satomi U	January 2024
Higanjima 48-nichi-go... (彼岸島 48日後...)	Kouji Matsumoto	August 2014
Hime Goto Kakushi Goto (ひめごとかくしごと)	Tsukumonoi	May 2026
Kakuriki (カクリキ)	Gohōbi	April 2026
Kenka Kagyō (喧嘩稼業)	Yasuaki Kita	December 2013
Manchuria Opium Squad (満州アヘンスクワッド, Manshū Ahen Sukuwaddo)	Tsukasa Monma, Shikako, Tsurushima	September 2021
Me and the Prez, Drinking Under the Stars (社長と酒と星, Shachō to Sake to Hoshi)	Zurikishi	May 2025
Minami-ke (みなみけ)	Koharu Sakuraba	March 2004
Imōto wa Shitte Iru (妹は知っている)	Mari Gangi	November 2024
Nezumi's First Love (ねずみの初恋, Nezumi no Hatsukoi)	Riku Ooseto	November 2023
Parallel Paradise (パラレルパラダイス, Parareru Paradaisu)	Lynn Okamoto	March 2017
Rat Collective (ラットコレクティブ, Ratto Korekutibu)	Chikara Ōmura	May 2026
Roh-Warai (ローワライ, Rō Warai)	Ashita Yukino	January 2026
Seven Shakespeares: Non Sanz Droict (7人のシェイクスピア NON SANZ DROICT, Nana-nin no Sheikusupia: Non Sanzu Doroikuto)	Harold Sakuishi	December 2016
Shōjōhime (猩猩姫)	ippatu	December 2025
Still You	Kami Nishio	August 2026
Subaru and Subaru (昴と彗星, Subaru to Subaru)	Shuichi Shigeno	July 2025
Tawawa on Monday (月曜日のたわわ, Getsuyōbi no Tawawa)	Kiseki Himura	November 2020
The Exiled Heavy Knight Knows How to Game the System (追放された転生重騎士はゲーム知識で無双する, Tsuihō Sareta Tensei Jū Kishi wa Gēmu Chishiki de Musō Suru)	Nekoko, Jaian, Lee Brocco	September 2024
Dragon no I de Oyasumi (ドラゴンの胃でおやすみ, Doragon no I de Oyasumi)	Yū Ōhashi, Ryū Nishimura	February 2026
The Fable: The Third Secret (ザ・ファブル The third secret, Za Faburu: Za Sādo Shīkuretto)	Katsuhisa Minami	March 2025
Tobaku Datenroku Kaiji: 24-oku Dasshutsu-hen (賭博堕天録カイジ 24億脱出編)	Nobuyuki Fukumoto	August 2017
Under Ninja (アンダーニンジャ, Andā Ninja)	Kengo Hanazawa	July 2018
With You and the Rain (雨と君と, Ame to Kimi to)	Kō Nikaidō	August 2020
xxxHolic: Rei (×××HOLiC◆戻)	Clamp	April 2013
Ya Boy Kongming! (パリピ孔明, Paripi Kōmei)	Yuto Yotsuba, Ryō Ogawa	November 2021
Zeikin de Katta Hon (税金で買った本)	Zuino, Kei Keiyama	December 2021

== Past series ==
=== 1980s ===
- Hello Harinezumi (ハロー張りネズミ) by Kenshi Hirokane (1980–1989)
- Gambler Jiko Chuushinha (ぎゅわんぶらあ自己中心派) by Masayuki Katayama (1982–1987)
- Akira by Katsuhiro Otomo (1982–1990)
- Be-Bop High School (ビー・バップ・ハイスクール) by Kazuhiro Kiuchi (1983–2003)
- Bataashi Kingyo (バタアシ金魚) by Minetarō Mochizuki (1985–1988)
- Judo-bu Monogatari (柔道部物語) by Makoto Kobayashi (1985–1991)
- Shakotan Boogie (シャコタン☆ブギ) by Michiharu Kusunoki (1986–1996)
- Gorillaman (ゴリラーマン) by Harold Sakuishi (1988–1993)
- 3×3 Eyes by Yuzo Takada (1989–2002) (transferred from Young Magazine Zōkan Kaizokuban)
- Kōgyō Aika Volley Boys (工業哀歌バレーボーイズ) by Hiroyuki Murata (1989–2006)

=== 1990s ===
- Ghost in the Shell 1.5: Human-Error Processor (攻殻機動隊 HUMAN-ERROR PROCESSOR) by Masamune Shirow (1991–1996)
- Wangan Midnight (湾岸ミッドナイト) by Michiharu Kusunoki (1992–2008)
- Weather Woman (お天気お姉さん) by Tetsu Adachi (1992–1994)
- Hauntress (座敷女, Zashiki Onna) by Minetaro Mochizuki (1993)
- The Ping Pong Club (行け!稲中卓球部) by Minoru Furuya (1993–1996)
- Dragon Head (ドラゴンヘッド) by Minetaro Mochizuki (1994–1999)
- Initial D (頭文字D) by Shuichi Shigeno (1995–2013)
- Taberemasen (食べれません) by Yanwari Kazama (1995–2013)
- Tobaku Mokushiroku Kaiji (賭博黙示録カイジ) by Nobuyuki Fukumoto (1996–1999)
- Ghost in the Shell 2: Man-Machine Interface (攻殻機動隊 MAN-MACHINE INTERFACE) by Masamune Shirow (1997)
- Ago Nashi Gen to Ore Monogatari (アゴなしゲンとオレ物語) by Akira Hiramoto (1998–2009)
- Ippatsu Kiki Musume (イッパツ危機娘) by Shigemitsu Harada (1998–2000)
- Flowers & Bees (花とみつばち, Hana to Mitsubachi) by Moyoco Anno (1999–2003)
- Bakugyaku Familia (莫逆家族) by Hiroshi Tanaka (1999–2004)
- Naniwa Tomoare (ナニワトモアレ) by Katsuhisa Minami (1999–2006)

=== 2000s ===
- Karate Shōkōshi Kohinata Minoru (空手小公子 小日向海流) by Baba Yasushi (2000–2012)
- Tobaku Hakairoku Kaiji (賭博破戒録カイジ) by Nobuyuki Fukumoto (2000–2004)
- Chobits (ちょびっツ) by Clamp (2000–2002)
- Himizu (ヒミズ) by Minoru Furuya (2001–2002)
- Gagagaga (ガガガガ) by Yutaka Yamashita (2001) (transferred to Monthly Afternoon in June 2005)
- Higanjima (彼岸島) by Kōji Matsumoto (2002–2010)
- Remote (リモート) by Tadashi Agi and Tetsuya Koshiba (2002–2004)
- xxxHolic by Clamp (2003–2011)
- Ciguatera (シガテラ) by Minoru Furuya (2003–2005)
- Saru Lock (猿ロック) by Naoki Serizawa (2003–2009)
- Out Law (アウト・ロー) by Kōji Kōno (2003–2007)
- Sengoku (センゴク) by Hideki Miyashita (2004–2007)
- Tobaku Datenroku Kaiji (賭博堕天録カイジ) by Nobuyuki Fukumoto (2004–2008)
- Biomega (バイオメガ) by Tsutomu Nihei (2004) (transferred to Shueisha's Ultra Jump in May 2006)
- Sweet Poolside (スイートプールサイド) by Shūzō Oshimi (2004)
- Kenka Shōbai (喧嘩商売) by Yasuaki Kita (2005–2011)
- Cherry Nights (チェリーナイツ) by Dragon Odawara (2005–2011)
- Shinjuku Swan (新宿スワン) by Ken Wakui (2005–2013)
- The Yagyu Ninja Scrolls (Y十M ～柳生忍法帖～) by Masaki Segawa (2005–2008)
- Wanitokagegisu (わにとかげぎす) by Minoru Furuya (2006–2007)
- Kōshoku Aika Volley Boys (好色哀歌 元バレーボーイズ) by Hiroyuki Murata (2006–2011)
- Winning Ticket (ウイニング・チケット) by Hiromoto Komatsu (2006–2011)
- Sengoku Tenshō-ki (センゴク天正記) by Hideki Miyashita (2007–2012)
- Himeanole (ヒメアノ～ル, Himeanōru) by Minoru Furuya (2008–2010)
- Kiss×sis by Bow Ditama (2008–2009) (transferred to Monthly Young Magazine in December 2009)
- Coppelion (コッペリオン) by Tomonori Inoue (2008–2016)
- Wangan Midnight: C1 Runner by Michiharu Kusunoki (2008–2012)
- All Esper Dayo! (みんな!エスパーだよ!) by Kiminori Wakasugi (2009–2016)
- Tobaku Datenroku Kaiji: Kazuya-hen (賭博堕天録カイジ 和也編) by Nobuyuki Fukumoto (2009–2012)
- Kaitan (カイタン) by Hiroshi Kisashi (2009–2010)
- Ghost in the Shell: Stand Alone Complex by Yu Kinutani (2009–2010)
- Sengoku Gaiden Okehazama Senki (センゴク外伝 桶狭間戦記) by Hideki Miyashita (2010) (transferred from Monthly Young Magazine, originally published in Bessatsu Young Magazine)

=== 2010s ===
- Montage (モンタージュ) by Jun Watanabe (2010–2015)
- Higanjima: Saigo no 47 Nichikan (彼岸島 最後の47日間) by Kōji Matsumoto (2010–2014)
- Kurohyō: Ryū ga Gotoku Shinshō (クロヒョウ 龍が如く新章) by Yukai Asada (2010–2011)
- Prison School (監獄学園) by Akira Hiramoto (2011–2017)
- Psychometrer (サイコメトラ) by Yuma Ando and Masashi Asaki (2011–2014) (indefinite hiatus)
- Green Blood by Masasumi Kakizaki (2011–2013)
- Yuki ni Tsubasa (雪にツバサ) by Shin Takahashi (2011–2013)
- Wild Cherry Nights (ワイルドチェリーナイツ) by Dragon Odawara (2011–2012)
- Saltiness (サルチネス, Saruchinesu) by Minoru Furuya (2012–2013)
- 8♀1♂ (ハチイチ) by Kaori Saki (2012–2015)
- Sengoku Ittō-ki (センゴク一統記) by Hideki Miyashita (2012–2015)
- Hantsu × Trash (ハンツー×トラッシュ) by Hiyoko Kobayashi (2012–2020)
- Cherry Nights R (チェリーナイツR) by Dragon Odawara (2012–2014)
- Tobaku Datenroku Kaiji: One Poker-hen (賭博堕天録カイジ ワン・ポーカー編) by Nobuyuki Fukumoto (2013–2017)
- Yuki ni Tsubasa: Haru (雪にツバサ・春) by Shin Takahashi (2013–2015)
- Tokkō Jimuin Minowa (特攻事務員ミノワ) by Kei Ogawa (2013)
- Debusen (でぶせん) by Yuma Ando and Masashi Asaki (2014–2016)
- Takane no Hana (高嶺の花) by Shuichi Shigeno (2014)
- GTO: Paradise Lost (GTO パラダイス・ロスト) by Tooru Fujisawa (2014–2023) (transferred to Magazine Pocket in April 2024)
- Harem Marriage (ハレ婚。, Harekon.) by NON (2014–2019)
- The Fable (ザ・ファブル, Za Faburu) by Katsuhisa Minami (2014–2019)
- Back Street Girls (バックストリートガールズ) by Jasmine Gyuh (2015–2018)
- Sailor Ace (セーラーエース) by Shuichi Shigeno (2015–2017)
- Shōjo Fujuubun (少女不十分) by Mitsuru Hattori (2015–2016)
- Sengoku Gonbe (センゴク権兵衛) by Hideki Miyashita (2015–2022)
- Magical Sempai (手品先輩, Tejina Senpai) by Azu (2016–2021)
- Origin by Boichi (2016–2019)
- Are You Lost? (ソウナンですか？, Sōnan desu ka?) by Kentarō Okamoto and Riri Sagara (2017–2022)
- Satanophany (サタノファニ) by Yamada Yoshinobu (2017–2023) (transferred to Yanmaga Web)
- Korosazaru Mono, Ikubekarazu (殺さざる者、生くべからず) by Yousuke Nakamura (2017)
- Why the Hell Are You Here, Teacher!? (なんでここに先生が!?, Nande Koko ni Sensei ga!?) by Soborou (2017–2024)
- NeuN by Tsutomu Takahashi (2017–2020)
- My Home Hero (マイホームヒーロー) by Masashi Asaki, Naoki Yamakawa (2017–2024)
- Basilisk: The Ouka Ninja Scrolls (バジリスク〜桜花忍法帖〜) by Tatsuya Shihira (2017–2019)
- MF Ghost (MFゴースト) by Shuichi Shigeno (2017–2025)
- Hen na Chishiki ni Kuwashii Kanojo Takayukashiki Sōko-san (変な知識に詳しい彼女 高床式草子さん) by Ohana-chan (2018–2020)
- My Dearest Self with Malice Aforethought (親愛なる僕へ殺意をこめて, Shinainaru Boku e Satsui o Komete) by Hajime Inoryū and Shōta Itō (2018–2019) (transferred to Comic Days in August 2019)
- My Boy (私の少年, Watashi no Shōnen) by Hitomi Takano (2018–2020)
- My Roomie Is a Dino (ギャルと恐竜, Gal to Kyōryū) by Moriko Mori and Cota Tomimura (2018–2022)
- Fujimi no Tokkouhei: Ikitoshi Ikeru Monotachi e (不死身の特攻兵 生キトシ生ケル者タチヘ) by Naoki Azuma and Shouji Koukami (2018–2020)
- New Nobunaga Chronicles (新・信長公記 〜ノブナガくんと私〜) by Shinobu Kaitani (2019–2020) (transferred to Comic Days in July 2020)
- Yukionna to Kani o Kuu (雪女と蟹を食う) by Gino0808 (2019–2020)
- Chigirenai Hito (契れないひと) by Takeshi Taka (2019–2020)
- Minagoroshi no Arthur (皆殺しのアーサー) by Yuichirō Koga (2019–2020)
- Kubi o Kiraneba Wakarumai (首を斬らねば分かるまい) by Tsukasa Monma and Yoshiki Kanata (2019–2020)
- Does a Hot Elf Live Next Door to You? (おたくの隣りはエルフですか?, Otaku no Tonari wa Elf desu ka?) by Meguru Ueno (2019–2021)
- Red Card (レッドカード, Reddo Kādo) by Masa Ichikawa (2019–2020)

=== 2020s ===
- Boys Run the Riot (ボーイズ・ラン・ザ・ライオット) by Keito Gaku (2020)
- Kissei Rettō (寄生列島) by Edogawa Edogawa (2020–2021)
- Bukuro Kicks (ブクロキックス) by Matsuki Ikka (2020–2021)
- God of Dog by Kō Kimura (2020–2021)
- Renkin Buraikan (錬金ブライカン) by Hakaru Takarai (2020–2021)
- Tokoshie × Bullet (永久×バレット) by Morion Airline and Akeji Fujimura (2020–2021)
- Gorillaman 40 (ゴリラーマン40) by Harold Sakuishi (2020–2022)
- Opekan (オペ看) by Mao Ningen and Misao (2020–2021)
- Sanzennenme no Kamitaiō (三千年目の神対応) by Fumitaka Katō (2020–2021)
- Tsugumi Project (虎鶫 とらつぐみ -TSUGUMI PROJECT-, Tora Tsugumi: Tsugumi Project) by Ippatu (2021–2023)
- The Fable: The Second Contact (ザ・ファブル The second contact) by Katsuhisa Minami (2021–2023)
- Gestalt (ゲシュタルト) by Ringo Yōtō (2021)
- Nazotoki yori mo Taihen da (謎解きよりも大変だ) (2021) by Jun Endō
- Rikō ni Naruniha Ao Sugiru (利口になるには青すぎる) by Yuto Uchida and Ryuki Ōnuma (2021)
- Gal-sen (ギャルせん, Gyaru sen) by Meguru Ueno (2021–2022) (transferred to Yanmaga Web)
- Kimi ga Kemono ni Naru Mae ni (君が獣になる前に) by Takashi Sano (2021–2023)
- Tsuwamonogatari (ツワモノガタリ) by Tadataka Hosokawa (2021–2022) (transferred to Yanmaga Web)
- Zomia (ゾミア) by Sohei Asamura and Ten Ishida (2022) (transferred to Yanmaga Web)
- Lili-Men by Meguru Ueno (2022–2024) (transferred to Yanmaga Web)
- Gorillaman 40: Family Arc (ゴリラーマン40 ファミリー編) by Harold Sakuishi (2022–2024)
- Myō-chan Sensei wa Kaku Katariki (みょーちゃん先生はかく語りき) by Tokusaku Kanari and Soda Muteki (2023–2025)
- Toxic Daughter: Chi-chan (ちーちゃん, Chii-chan) by Shūzō Oshimi (2024)
- Jin: Kakuto Haō-den (JIN 格斗破王伝) by Yūsuke Utsumi (2025–2026)
- Aya-gari no Kanoka (妖狩のカノカ) by Hatsu Minato (2026)
- Official Adultery? (公式不倫, Kōshiki Furin) by Nikumaru (2026)

== Circulation ==
Year / Period	Weekly circulation	Magazine sales (est.)	Sales revenue (est.)	Issue price (est.)
1986 to 1987	1,000,000	104,000,000	¥18,720,000,000	¥180
1988	1,400,000	72,800,000	¥13,104,000,000	¥180
1989	1,300,000	67,600,000	¥12,168,000,000	¥180
1990	1,500,000	78,000,000	¥14,040,000,000	¥180
1991	1,500,000	78,000,000	¥14,040,000,000	¥180
1992	1,500,000	78,000,000	¥14,820,000,000	¥190
1993	1,550,000	80,600,000	¥15,314,000,000	¥190
1994	1,550,000	80,600,000	¥16,926,000,000	¥210
1995	1,700,000	88,400,000	¥18,564,000,000	¥210
1996	1,740,000	90,480,000	¥19,000,800,000	¥210
1997	1,670,000	86,840,000	¥18,236,400,000	¥210
1998	1,500,000	78,000,000	¥16,380,000,000	¥210
1999	1,430,000	74,360,000	¥15,615,600,000	¥210
2000	1,300,000	67,600,000	¥14,196,000,000	¥210
2001 to 2002	1,250,000	130,000,000	¥27,300,000,000	¥210
2003	1,140,000	59,280,000	¥12,448,800,000	¥210
2004	1,100,000	57,200,000	¥12,012,000,000	¥210
2005	1,012,209	52,634,868	¥12,632,368,320	¥240
2006	998,198	51,906,296	¥12,457,511,040	¥240
2007	981,229	51,023,908	¥12,245,737,920	¥240
2008	940,817	48,922,484	¥11,741,396,160	¥240
2009	857,013	44,564,676	¥10,695,522,240	¥240
2010	807,871	42,009,292	¥10,082,230,080	¥240
January 2011 to September 2011	725,235	28,284,165	¥6,788,199,600	¥240
October 2011 to September 2012	665,407	34,601,164	¥8,304,279,360	¥240
October 2012 to September 2013	607,920	31,611,840	¥7,586,841,600	¥240
October 2013 to September 2014	537,105	27,929,460	¥6,703,070,400	¥240
October 2014 to September 2015	450,417	23,421,684	¥5,621,204,160	¥240
October 2015 to September 2016	415,592	21,610,784	¥5,186,588,160	¥240
October 2016 to September 2017	394,829	20,531,108	¥4,927,465,920	¥240
October 2017 to September 2018	361,946	18,821,192	¥4,517,086,080	¥240
1986 to September 2018	1,097,847	1,869,632,921	¥392,375,101,040 ($4.862 billion)	¥210
