= Dye Blue, Even If You Die. =

Japanese manga series

- First tankōbon volume cover

蒼く染めろ (Aoku Somero)
- Genre: Drama; Sports
- Manga
- Written by: Miyato Sakurai
- Published by: Kodansha
- Imprint: Shōnen Magazine Comics
- Magazine: Magazine Pocket; Comic Bull
- Original run: September 19, 2021 – present
- Volumes: 21

Dye Blue, Even If You Die. (蒼く染めろ, Aoku Somero) is a Japanese manga series written and illustrated by Miyato Sakurai. It began serialization on Kodansha's Magazine Pocket and Comic Bull website and app since September 2021, with its chapters collected in twenty-one tankōbon volumes as of August 2026.

== Publication ==
Written and illustrated by Miyato Sakurai, Dye Blue, Even If You Die. began serialization on Kodansha's Magazine Pocket website and app on September 19, 2021, and a week later in Comic Bull app on September 26. Kodansha has collected its chapters into individual tankōbon volumes. The first volume was released on December 17, 2021. As of August 17, 2026, twenty-one volumes have been released.

=== Volumes ===
No.	Release date	ISBN
1	December 17, 2021	978-4-06-525698-5
2	March 17, 2022	978-4-06-527287-9
3	July 15, 2022	978-4-06-528185-7
4	October 17, 2022	978-4-06-529130-6
5	December 16, 2022	978-4-06-530241-5
6	February 17, 2023	978-4-06-530614-7
7	May 17, 2023	978-4-06-531560-6
8	July 14, 2023	978-4-06-532193-5
9	October 17, 2023	978-4-06-532895-8
10	January 17, 2024	978-4-06-534183-4
11	March 15, 2024	978-4-06-534879-6
12	May 16, 2024	978-4-06-535513-8
13	August 16, 2024	978-4-06-535513-8
14	November 15, 2024	978-4-06-537135-0
15	February 17, 2025	978-4-06-538423-7
16	May 16, 2025	978-4-06-539448-9
17	August 12, 2025	978-4-06-540370-9
18	November 17, 2025	978-4-06-541548-1
19	February 17, 2026	978-4-06-542631-9
20	May 15, 2026	978-4-06-543632-5
21	August 17, 2026	978-4-06-544638-6

== Reception ==
The series was recommended by Blue Lock manga creators Muneyuki Kaneshiro and Yusuke Nomura.
