= List of Blue Lock episodes =

Key visual for the series

Blue Lock is an anime television series based on the manga series of the same name written by Muneyuki Kaneshiro and illustrated by Yusuke Nomura. It was announced on August 12, 2021. The series is produced by Eight Bit and directed by Tetsuaki Watanabe, with Shunsuke Ishikawa serving as assistant director, Taku Kishimoto overseeing the series' scripts, Masaru Shindō providing the main character designs and serving as chief animation director, Hisashi Tojima serving as chief action director, and Jun Murayama composing the music. The series' first season ran for 24 episodes from October 9, 2022, to March 26, 2023, on TV Asahi's NUMAnimation programming block. (Note: TV Asahi lists the series premiere at 25:30 on October 8, 2022, which is effectively 1:30 a.m. JST on October 9.) The first opening theme song is "Chaos ga Kiwamaru" (カオスが極まる; "Chaos Reigns") by Unison Square Garden, while the first ending theme song is "Winner" by Shugo Nakamura. The second opening theme song is "Judgement" by Ash Da Hero, while the second ending theme song is "Numbness Like a Ginger" by Unison Square Garden.

Crunchyroll has licensed the series, and have streamed an English dub starting on October 22, 2022. Medialink licensed the series in Asia-Pacific. It was broadcast on Animax Asia in the region.

Following the end of the first season, a second season was announced, along with a film adaptation of the Episode Nagi manga which released in Japanese theaters on April 19, 2024. Titled vs. U-20 Japan, the season aired from October 5 to December 28, 2024, on TV Asahi's brand new IMAnimation block. The opening theme song is "Bōjaku no Charisma" (傍若のカリスマ, Bōjaku no Karisuma), performed by Unison Square Garden, while the ending theme song is "One", performed by Snow Man.

On September 28, 2025, a third season covering the "Neo Egoist League" story arc was announced at the "Blue Lock Egoist Fest 2025" event.

== Series overview ==
Season	Episodes	Originally released	
Season	Episodes	First released	Last released
1	24	October 9, 2022	March 26, 2023
2	14	October 5, 2024	December 28, 2024

== Episodes ==
=== Season 1 (2022–23) ===
No. overall	No. in season	Title	Directed by (Note: Production staff information is taken from the ending credits of each episode.)	Storyboarded by	Original release date	English air date
1	1	"Dream"; Transliteration: "Yume" (Japanese: 夢)	Tetsuaki Watanabe, Masao Kawase & Kazuki Yokoyama	Tetsuaki Watanabe	October 9, 2022	February 8, 2026
2	2	"Monster"; Transliteration: "Kaibutsu" (Japanese: かいぶつ)	Shunsuke Ishikawa	Shunsuke Ishikawa	October 16, 2022	February 15, 2026
3	3	"Soccer's "Zero""; Transliteration: "Sakkā no Zero" (Japanese: サッカーの0)	Kazuki Yokoyama	Tetsuaki Watanabe & Takaaki Ishiyama	October 23, 2022	February 22, 2026
4	4	"Premonition and Intuition"; Transliteration: "Yokan to Chokkan" (Japanese: 予感と直感)	Takahiro Enokida	Shunsuke Ishikawa	October 30, 2022	March 1, 2026
5	5	"To Be Reborn"; Transliteration: "Umarekawaru no wa" (Japanese: 生まれ変わるのは)	Chihiro Kumano	Tetsuaki Watanabe & Takaaki Ishiyama	November 6, 2022	March 8, 2026
6	6	"I'm Sorry"; Transliteration: "Gomen" (Japanese: ごめん)	Tatsuya Ishiguro	Satoshi Shimizu	November 13, 2022	March 15, 2026
7	7	"Rush"; Transliteration: "Tagiri" (Japanese: 滾り)	Yoshito Mikamo & Akira Toba	Tetsuaki Watanabe, Shunsuke Ishikawa & Takaaki Ishiyama	November 20, 2022	March 22, 2026
8	8	"The Formula for Goals"; Transliteration: "Gōru no Hōtei Shiki" (Japanese: 成功(ゴール)の方程式)	Kentarō Sugimoto	Tomohiro Furukawa	November 27, 2022	March 29, 2026
9	9	"Awakening"; Transliteration: "Kakusei" (Japanese: 覚醒)	Takayuki Tanaka	Kiyoshi Okuyama, Nitta Chishima & Yūji Haibara	December 4, 2022	April 5, 2026
10	10	"Just the Way It Is"; Transliteration: "Kono Mama de" (Japanese: このままで)	Kazuki Yokoyama	Kazuki Yokoyama	December 11, 2022	April 12, 2026
11	11	"The Final Piece"; Transliteration: "Saigo no Pīsu" (Japanese: 最後の欠片(ピース))	Norio Kashima	Shigeru Morikawa	December 18, 2022	April 19, 2026
12	12	"The Second Selection"; Transliteration: "Ni-ji Serekushon" (Japanese: 二次選考(セレクション))	Yūsuke Onoda	Masashi Kojima	December 25, 2022	April 26, 2026
13	13	"Top 3" (Note: Stylized in all caps)	Yasushi Muroya	Kazuki Yokoyama	January 8, 2023	May 3, 2026
14	14	"The Geniuses and the Average Joes"; Transliteration: "Tensai to Bonsai" (Japanese: 天才と凡才)	Hiroshi Kimura & Fukutarō Hattori	Kiyoshi Okuyama & Chihiro Nitta	January 15, 2023	May 10, 2026
15	15	"Devour"; Transliteration: "Kurau" (Japanese: 喰)	Yoshito Mikamo & Shintarō Inokawa	Keiichi Sekino	January 22, 2023	May 17, 2026
16	16	"Tri-Fusion"; Transliteration: "Torai-Sesshon" (Japanese: 三者融合(トライ・セッション))	Kōhei Kuratomi	Shigeru Morikawa	January 29, 2023	May 24, 2026
17	17	"Donkey"; Transliteration: "Hetakuso" (Japanese: ヘタクソ)	Yūsuke Onoda & Shintarō Inokawa	Kiyoshi Okuyama & Chihiro Nitta	February 5, 2023	May 31, 2026
18	18	"The Stage for the Lead"; Transliteration: "Shuyaku no Sutēji" (Japanese: 主役の座(ステージ))	Hiroshi Kimura & Fukutarō Hattori	EdgeWorks & Isowa Yuri	February 12, 2023	June 14, 2026
19	19	"Dancing Boy"	Norio Kashima	Yasushi Muroya	February 19, 2023	June 21, 2026
20	20	"Super Link-Up Play"; Transliteration: "Chō Rendō" (Japanese: 超連動)	Takayuki Tanaka & Noriyoshi Sasaki	Kiyoshi Okuyama & Chihiro Nitta	February 26, 2023	June 28, 2026
21	21	"I'm Not There"; Transliteration: "Ore ga Inai" (Japanese: 俺がいない)	Kōhei Kuratomi	Barnstorm Design Labo & Yoshikazu Miyao	March 5, 2023	July 5, 2026
22	22	"Voice"; Transliteration: "Koe" (Japanese: 声)	Kazuki Yokoyama	Kiyoshi Okuyama & Chihiro Nitta	March 12, 2023	July 12, 2026
23	23	"Luck"	Hiroshi Kimura & Fukutarō Hattori	Kōhei Kuratomi	March 19, 2023	July 19, 2026
24	24	"The Time Has Come"; Transliteration: "Toki wa Kitari" (Japanese: 時は来たり)	Tetsuaki Watanabe, Kōhei Kuratomi & Shintarō Inokawa	Tetsuaki Watanabe, Chihiro Nitta & Kiyoshi Okuyama	March 26, 2023	July 26, 2026

=== Season 2: Blue Lock vs. U-20 Japan (2024) ===
No. overall	No. in season	Title	Directed by	Storyboarded by	Original release date
25	1	"Tryouts"; Transliteration: "Toraiauto" (Japanese: 適性試験(トライアウト))	Masahiro Amano & Ryōtarō Honda	Kiyoshi Okuyama & Chihiro Nitta	October 6, 2024 (Note: This episode aired at 12:00 a.m. JST, 30 minutes after the original air time on TV Asahi.)
26	2	"The Assassin and the Ninja"; Transliteration: "Koroshi-ya to Ninja" (Japanese: 殺し屋と忍者)	Fukutarō Hattori & Hiroshi Kimura	Chihiro Nitta, Akemi Nakajima & Chisaki Satō	October 12, 2024
27	3	"The World You Feel"; Transliteration: "Kanjiru Sekai" (Japanese: 感じる世界)	Mitsutoshi Satō	Chihiro Nitta & Kiyoshi Okuyama	October 19, 2024
28	4	"Chameleon"; Transliteration: "Kamereon" (Japanese: カメレオン)	Yuki Nishiyama	Chisaki Satō, Chihiro Nitta & Kiyoshi Okuyama	October 26, 2024
29	5	"Flow"	Hiroshi Kimura & Fukutarō Hattori	Chisaki Satō	November 2, 2024
30	6	"The Big Stage"; Transliteration: "Ōbutai" (Japanese: 大舞台)	Kenji Yasuda	Suzuka Yoshida, Chihiro Nitta & Kiyoshi Okuyama	November 9, 2024
31	7	"Itoshi Sae"; Transliteration: "Itoshi Sae" (Japanese: 糸師 冴)	Yūsuke Kamata & Kentarō Sugimoto	Katsumi Terahigashi	November 16, 2024
32	8	"Blue Genes"; Transliteration: "Ao no Idenshi" (Japanese: 青の遺伝子)	Mitsutoshi Satō	Kiyoshi Okuyama & Chihiro Nitta	November 23, 2024
33	9	"Night Snow"; Transliteration: "Naito Sunō" (Japanese: ナイトスノウ)	Hiroshi Kimura & Fukutarō Hattori	Masashi Kojima	December 1, 2024
34	10	"The Subs Take to the Stage"; Transliteration: "Kōtai Geki" (Japanese: 交代劇)	Aya Ikeda	Chisaki Satō	December 8, 2024 (Note: This episode aired at 12:30 a.m. JST, 1 hour after the original air time on TV Asahi.)
35	11	"What You Taught Us"; Transliteration: "Oshieta Koto" (Japanese: 教えた感情(コト))	Shin Tosaka	Kiyoshi Okuyama & Chihiro Nitta	December 14, 2024
36	12	"Flowers"; Transliteration: "Hana" (Japanese: 花)	Mitsutoshi Satō	Chihiro Nitta & Kiyoshi Okuyama	December 21, 2024
37	13	"Not Alone"; Transliteration: "Hitori Janai" (Japanese: ひとりじゃない)	Yūsuke Kamata & Daisuke Tsukushi	Chihiro Nitta, Kiyoshi Okuyama & Chisaki Satō	December 28, 2024 (Note: Episodes 13 and 14 premiered back-to-back, with Episode 13 airing 30 mins earlier than the original air time on TV Asahi.)
38	14	"Last Attack"; Transliteration: "Owari Geki" (Japanese: 終撃)	Kentarō Sugimoto & Hajime Nihira	Kiyoshi Okuyama, Chisaki Satō & Hajime Nihira	December 28, 2024

== Home media release ==
=== Japanese ===
Bandai Namco Filmworks (Japan – Region 2/A)
Vol.	Episodes	Cover character(s)	Release date	Ref.
Season 1
1	1–6	Yoichi Isagi and Meguru Bachira	January 27, 2023	
2	7–12	Rensuke Kunigami and Hyōma Chigiri	March 24, 2023	
3	13–18	Seishiro Nagi and Reo Mikage	May 26, 2023	
4	19–24	Yoichi Isagi and Rin Itoshi	July 28, 2023	
Season 2
1	25–31	Yoichi Isagi, Yō Hiori and Nijirō Nanase	March 26, 2025	
2	32–38	Rin and Sae Itoshi	May 28, 2025	

=== English ===
Crunchyroll, LLC (North America – Region 1/A)
Part	Episodes	Release date	Ref.
Season 1
1	1–12	November 14, 2023	
2	13–24	May 28, 2024	
Season 2
1	25–38	January 13, 2026	
