= Blue Lock season 1 =

Season of anime television series

Blue Lock
- Season 1
- Japanese cover art for the first Blu-ray volume of the season, featuring Yoichi Isagi (L) and Meguru Bachira (R)
- No. of episodes: 24

Release
- Original network: TV Asahi
- Original release: October 9, 2022 – March 26, 2023

Season chronology
- Next → Season 2

Blue Lock is an anime television series based on the manga series Blue Lock, written by Muneyuki Kaneshiro and illustrated by Yusuke Nomura. The first season was produced by Eight Bit and directed by Tetsuaki Watanabe, with Shunsuke Ishikawa serving as assistant director, Taku Kishimoto overseeing the series' scripts, Masaru Shindō providing the main character designs and serving as chief animation director, Hisashi Tojima serving as chief action director, and Jun Murayama composing the music. The 24-episode season aired from October 9, 2022, to March 26, 2023, on TV Asahi's NUMAnimation programming block. (Note: TV Asahi listed the series premiere as airing on October 8, 2022, at 25:30, which is effectively October 9 at 1:30 a.m. JST.) The first season adapts the first eleven volumes of the manga (chapters 1–94). The series follows Yoichi Isagi, an unknown high school football player who is conflicted about his playing style, deciding to join the Blue Lock program managed by Jinpachi Ego alongside 299 other players, so that he can become the best striker in the world.

The first opening theme song is "Chaos ga Kiwamaru" (カオスが極まる; lit. 'Chaos Reigns'), performed by Unison Square Garden, while the first ending theme song is "Winner", performed by Shugo Nakamura. The second opening theme song is "Judgement", performed by Ash Da Hero, while the second ending theme song is "Numbness Like a Ginger", performed by Unison Square Garden.

Crunchyroll licensed the series and began streaming an English dub on October 22, 2022. Medialink licensed the series in Asia-Pacific. In January 2026, it was announced that the English dub would make its broadcast television premiere in the United States on Adult Swim's Toonami programming block beginning on February 8, 2026.

== Episodes ==
No. overall	No. in season	Title	Directed by (Note: Production staff information is taken from the ending credits of each episode.)	Storyboarded by	Original release date	English air date
1	1	"Dream"; Transliteration: "Yume" (Japanese: 夢)	Tetsuaki Watanabe, Masao Kawase & Kazuki Yokoyama	Tetsuaki Watanabe	October 9, 2022	February 8, 2026
In the prefectural tournament finals with his team trailing 1–0, striker Yoichi Isagi, heeding the words from his coach about soccer being a team game, opts to pass the ball to his wide-open teammate rather than shooting at the goal himself, and his teammate misses. The opponent takes the ball the other way, with their captain Ryosuke Kira kicking the match-clinching goal to advance to the national tournament. Sometime later, Isagi is summoned to the Japan Football Union, and he finds himself being one of 300 strikers confined at a remote soccer training facility called Blue Lock directed by coach Jinpachi Ego, being put through a survival boot camp in order to develop the ultimate striker for the Japan national football team with the winner becoming the team's starting striker and the rest banned from playing for the national team. The first trial is a game of tag in which the person who is struck by a kicked ball is 'it', and whoever is 'it' when time expires is eliminated. The lowest-ranked striker, Gurimu "Igaguri" Igarashi, starts out being 'it', and Isagi ends up being tagged to become 'it'. Rather than choosing to eliminate Igarashi while he is down, Isagi takes the risk to eliminate a stronger player, and just before time expires, he tags Kira to eliminate him.
2	2	"Monster"; Transliteration: "Kaibutsu" (Japanese: かいぶつ)	Shunsuke Ishikawa	Shunsuke Ishikawa	October 16, 2022	February 15, 2026
In a meeting at the Japan Football Union, new recruit and creator of Blue Lock, Anri Teieri, criticizes the board for their way of thinking. Back at Blue Lock, Ego explains to Kira that his lack of egoism made him unfit to be the ultimate striker as he leaves Blue Lock. Ego then explains that the 11 players remaining will form Team Z and live together, with the message that at times the players will work together and at other times betray each other. Afterwards, the players train and eat together. At night, Isagi practices with teammate Meguru Bachira, and Bachira explains that he has some monster inside of him that tells him the best course of action. Afterwards, Ego explains that teams are assigned based on player rank and Team Z has all the lowest-rated players. He then explains the next trial that will be a group play tournament against the other four teams in their building, one of five in the facility, with the top two teams advancing. With all players being forwards, Ego has tasked the players to play soccer from zero. Team Z prepares to play their first match against Team X.
3	3	"Soccer's "Zero""; Transliteration: "Sakkā no Zero" (Japanese: サッカーの0)	Kazuki Yokoyama	Tetsuaki Watanabe & Takaaki Ishiyama	October 23, 2022	February 22, 2026
Before the match, Ego explains that in addition to the two winning teams, the leading scorers from the eliminated teams will also advance. The match begins with fighting amongst teammates to advance by being the top scorer, but Team X starts to play as a team with Shouei Barou scoring the first goal as the trigger while the in-fighting continues with Team Z, allowing Team X to take a 5–0 lead. The zero on the scoreboard leads Isagi to believe that what Ego meant by playing soccer from zero means scoring the first goal. Team Z avoids the shutout with a goal by Rensuke Kunigami before time expires to make the final score 5–1. After the match, Jingo Raichi confronts Isagi, demanding to know why he passed the ball to Kunigami despite Raichi being more wide open, while Barou advises Isagi not to be nervous in front of the goal. Back in the locker room, Isagi explains what he concluded when Ego said to play soccer from zero, pointing to Barou's goal as the catalyst. Ego then explains that while Isagi is partially correct, his message relates to the open-ended nature of a striker, pointing out that Japanese athletes are successful when they have defined roles, but struggle in sports that rely heavily on open-ended roles like in soccer.
4	4	"Premonition and Intuition"; Transliteration: "Yokan to Chokkan" (Japanese: 予感と直感)	Takahiro Enokida	Shunsuke Ishikawa	October 30, 2022	March 1, 2026
With Isagi struggling mentally, he asks Kunigami why he plays soccer, responding that he idolizes strikers as real-life superheroes and wants to become one. Kunigami also explains that goal scorers get bonus points to spend for stuff to improve quality of life at Blue Lock, and Kunigami uses his for a steak he shares with Isagi as gratitude for the assist. Kunigami also tells Isagi that he has a special talent for sensing where to go with the ball to score goals. The next day, Team Z and Team Y play a match that amounts to an elimination game with both teams losing badly in their first match. Team Z puts their position rotation strategy into motion with Bachira starting out as the striker, but Bachira struggles as his shots get blocked. Team Y then puts their plan into motion to focus on defense, then steal the ball, and following a long pass to the team's best player, Hibiki Ohkawa, he scores on a breakaway to give Team Y a 1–0 lead. Having taken the lead, Team Y deploys stall tactics by passing the ball around to run out the clock, but Team Z steals possession and ties the match with a goal from Gin Gagamaru, all while Isagi notices that Ohkawa's teammate Ikki Niko is the team's true leader who is calling the shots.
5	5	"To Be Reborn"; Transliteration: "Umarekawaru no wa" (Japanese: 生まれ変わるのは)	Chihiro Kumano	Tetsuaki Watanabe & Takaaki Ishiyama	November 6, 2022	March 8, 2026
Having figured out that Niko possesses the same ability he has, Isagi sees his former self inside of Niko. With the match tied at 1–1, Team Y continues to play defense until the last minute. Having drawn Team Z into the offensive zone, Team Y rushes towards the goal with Niko passing the ball to Ohkawa for a wide-open shot to score the game-winning goal. However, Isagi manages to run back just in time to block Ohkawa's shot and take possession of the ball. Isagi completes a long pass to Kunigami, who passes the ball to Bachira, and then passes it to Isagi to score and give Team Z the win by the final score of 2–1. Afterwards, the team celebrates their win with a potluck. That night, Hyoma Chigiri tells Isagi that he tore his ACL a year ago and that he is afraid that he might tear it again, which would end his playing career, and Isagi lets Chigiri know that he needs to be prepared to give up everything in order to make it in the sport. The next day, Ego releases new rankings, and Isagi is now Team Z's top player, while explaining that each player has a different talent that they need to figure out how to utilize.
6	6	"I'm Sorry"; Transliteration: "Gomen" (Japanese: ごめん)	Tatsuya Ishiguro	Satoshi Shimizu	November 13, 2022	March 15, 2026
The current standings are revealed with Team V on top, having won both of their matches, while the other four teams have one win each. Team Z enters their match against Team W with a great sense of urgency, knowing that their final match is against Team V, who has dominated the block. Team Z takes a 3–0 lead into halftime over Team W with a hat trick scored by Wataru Kuon. However, that lead is quickly erased at the start of the second half. With Isagi noticing that Team W is in perfect position to counter Team Z's strategy, as well as Kuon intentionally making mistakes that allowed the Wanima twins to score easy goals for Team W, Isagi correctly deduces that Kuon is betraying the team. Kuon explains that he made a deal with the Wanima twins to allow Team W to win in exchange for allowing Kuon to advance for being Team Z's leading goal scorer, and as such, they allowed Kuon to score three goals in the first half, and then Kuon would give away Team Z's strategy. Now aware that the match is 10 against 12, Isagi scrambles to figure out a new strategy.
7	7	"Rush"; Transliteration: "Tagiri" (Japanese: 滾り)	Yoshito Mikamo & Akira Toba	Tetsuaki Watanabe, Shunsuke Ishikawa & Takaaki Ishiyama	November 20, 2022	March 22, 2026
Down 4–3 with Kuon leaking Team Z's strategy to Team W, Chigiri recalls his soccer career as he was called the genius and played for the same high school as the Wanima twins. He was a star player known for his speed, but tore his ACL, which put his career on hold and has been holding him back, fearing that he might reinjure his knee, which would end his career. Needing a new strategy that can't be countered by Kuon, Team Z places their hopes on Chigiri since Kuon does not know about Chigiri's injury. With the match entering stoppage time, Isagi passes the ball to the other side of the pitch. Using his speed, having heeded Isagi's advice about being prepared to lose everything, Chigiri takes the ball and scores the equalizer in the final minute to end the match in a 4–4 draw. After the match, Kuon is beaten up by Team W for not telling them about Chigiri. Sometime later, Kuon attempts to negotiate a similar deal with Seishiro Nagi, Reo Mikage, and Zantetsu Tsurugi of Team V, but they are uninterested. Overhearing the conversation and bothered by their view of the game, Isagi confronts Team V to criticize them for their commitment to soccer.
8	8	"The Formula for Goals"; Transliteration: "Gōru no Hōtei Shiki" (Japanese: 成功(ゴール)の方程式)	Kentarō Sugimoto	Tomohiro Furukawa	November 27, 2022	March 29, 2026
Reo explains that he got interested in soccer when watching the World Cup, but with his father wanting him to succeed him as the CEO of his family's company, he did not approve of his soccer dream. One day, Reo encountered Nagi, and they have since become teammates. As Team Z prepares for their final match against Team V, which they must win to advance, Ego explains to Team Z that the goals they scored are not reproducible and that reproducibility is a critical skill for a striker. With that message, Isagi asks Barou for advice on reproducibility, and after seeing him score twice on him in practice, he figures out the mechanics that lead him to mastering the art of reproducing goals. The next day, Team Z has their match with Team V, having come up with a strategy that does not involve Kuon, and the plan initially works. However, the shot misses. Off the missed shot, Reo completes a long and risky no-look pass to Nagi on the opposite side of the pitch, and Nagi scores the first goal of the match for Team V.
9	9	"Awakening"; Transliteration: "Kakusei" (Japanese: 覚醒)	Takayuki Tanaka	Kiyoshi Okuyama, Nitta Chishima & Yūji Haibara	December 4, 2022	April 5, 2026
Team V goes up 3–0 after Nagi scores another goal using the same pass, and Zantetsu uses his speed while taking advantage of Team Z's attention on Nagi to score from long range. Realizing that their tactics are not working, Bachira awakens his monstrous self in the thrill of battle to send a message to Team Z to awaken their hidden potential to become super special. Bachira dribbles past Reo, fakes Zantetsu out, and lobs the ball over Team V's goalkeeper to cut Team V's lead to 3–1, prompting Team Z to follow Bachira's lead to evolve and awaken their hidden abilities. Kunigami scores with a mid-range shot that fools the goalkeeper due to the lack of spin to make the score 3–2 going into halftime. The second half begins with Gagamaru's shot blocked by Zantetsu, with Isagi taking the rebound, but his hesitation allows Nagi to take the ball away. Raichi psyches Reo out, leading Reo to a yellow card for elbowing Raichi. Chigiri takes the free kick, and taking advantage of his superior top speed despite Zantetsu's superior acceleration, he passes the ball to a distant spot on the pitch where only he can get to the ball and ties the score at 3–3 with 30 minutes left in the match.
10	10	"Just the Way It Is"; Transliteration: "Kono Mama de" (Japanese: このままで)	Kazuki Yokoyama	Kazuki Yokoyama	December 11, 2022	April 12, 2026
Faced with the prospect of defeat after dominating all previous matches, Team V responds to Team Z's awakening by evolving their game. Team V takes the lead with a goal by Nagi kicked from an impossibly tight angle. With that goal, Nagi suddenly finds soccer fun after viewing the game as boring. In response, Chigiri makes another long pass to himself with assistance from Isagi, who blocks Nagi from getting to the ball, and shoots at the goal that is saved. Gagamaru gets the rebound and makes a shot that is blocked by Reo, and on the rebound, Kunigami shoots and scores to tie the score at 4–4. In seeing the way his teammates are playing, Kuon recalls that he used to be enthusiastic about soccer, but his overbearing demeanor alienated his teammates. With the match entering stoppage time, Nagi breaks away for an easy goal, but Kuon tackles Nagi, which gets him a red card. On the ensuing free kick outside the penalty box, Nagi's shot is blocked by Gagamaru just before it enters the net. Isagi gets the ball on the rebound as he leads the charge to make one last attempt to score the match-winning goal that gets Team Z into the next round.
11	11	"The Final Piece"; Transliteration: "Saigo no Pīsu" (Japanese: 最後の欠片(ピース))	Norio Kashima	Shigeru Morikawa	December 18, 2022	April 19, 2026
Isagi leads Team Z down the pitch, and using his foresight, he finds a spot to the left of Chigiri and Kunigami in front of the net, correctly anticipating that Team V would send their defenders to mark them. However, he failed to notice Nagi marking him. After going through his thought process, Isagi decides to risk it all with a direct shot and scores the match-winning goal. With the first selection completed, everybody on Team V and Team Z advances for finishing first and second, while Junichi Wanima, Niko, and Barou advance for being the leading scorers on the eliminated teams. In preparation for the second selection, Ego has the remaining strikers undergo physical conditioning. Sometime later, the remaining strikers gather, and Ego reveals that all buildings at Blue Lock were actually labelled as Building 5 to get everybody to experience inferiority. He then explains that the first selection was about understanding what being a striker is about, and the second selection will be a series of individual challenges in five stages in which only teams of five strikers will make it through to the end.
12	12	"The Second Selection"; Transliteration: "Ni-ji Serekushon" (Japanese: 二次選考(セレクション))	Yūsuke Onoda	Masashi Kojima	December 25, 2022	April 26, 2026
In the 1st stage, Isagi enters a small soccer ground where he sees a holographic Blue Lock Man appear with a holographic gate and goal zone. Given 90 minutes to score 100 goals, Isagi clears the round and improves his shooting. When he enters the second stage, he sees Nagi and Reo among other players. A message appears, telling them to form a team of three to proceed to the next stage. Moments later, Bachira appears and immediately forms his team with Isagi. Initially planning to take Kunigami or Chigiri as their third member, Nagi offers Isagi to join his team. He declines, as he has already made his team with Bachira. Nagi opts to join them, leaving Reo. Moving to the third stage, they find a team consisting of Rin Itoshi, Jyubei Aryu, and Aoshi Tokimitsu, the highest-ranked players. Ego explains they are free to choose their opponents. The team that scores five goals first will win. The winning team can choose any member from the losing team. Isagi and his team decide to play against Rin's team.
13	13	"Top 3" (Note: Stylized in all caps)	Yasushi Muroya	Kazuki Yokoyama	January 8, 2023	May 3, 2026
The match starts between Isagi's team, in white, and Rin's team, in red. Team White scores a goal working together but is tied when Rin lands a shot from kick-off. In the next round, a pass to Isagi from Bachira is intercepted by Aryu, using his height and long limbs to steal the ball and score. When Bachira attempts to outmaneuver Tokimitsu next round, his skittish and meek demeanor suddenly gives way to monstrous speed and strength, overwhelming Bachira and Isagi to score. Nagi attempts a formation between the three of them to block their opponents' individual strengths, allowing them to score. Rin attempts another shot at kick-off but is blocked by Isagi, putting the ball out of bounds. Believing they have him locked down, Rin's ability to curve shots allows him to score from the corner with ease. With one goal left for Team Red, Team White uses the formation again. Bachira gives the ball to Isagi, and Rin moves behind him. Despite Isagi believing the space was open to score, Rin steals the ball and scores the winning goal for Team Red. They select Bachira to join them and proceed to the next stage.
14	14	"The Geniuses and the Average Joes"; Transliteration: "Tensai to Bonsai" (Japanese: 天才と凡才)	Hiroshi Kimura & Fukutarō Hattori	Kiyoshi Okuyama & Chihiro Nitta	January 15, 2023	May 10, 2026
Returning to the 2nd stage, Isagi and Nagi realize they are being tested on their individual strengths. To Isagi's surprise, Barou and former Team Z teammate Asahi Naruhaya are among the unselected; Barou, despite his excellent shooting, was not chosen for his selfish attitude. While training, Isagi is approached by Naruhaya; knowing that their lesser skill compared to Barou and Nagi will lead to their disqualification from Blue Lock should they lose, the two agree to play against each other. At the start of the match, Barou takes the ball from Nagi, showcasing his increased shooting range and scoring. In the next round, Isagi passes to Nagi, who uses his fine control to bypass Barou, allowing him to score. Later, Barou takes the ball but refuses to pass it to Naruhaya; Isagi steals it and passes it to Nagi for another goal. Angered, Barou tries a shot from kick-off next round but misses the net. Isagi runs for the ball but is beaten by Naruhaya, who passes it to Barou for a goal. He reveals the true reason they challenged them is that they know of Isagi's inability to score alone. When Barou passes to Naruhaya, he makes his way past Isagi and shoots.
15	15	"Devour"; Transliteration: "Kurau" (Japanese: 喰)	Yoshito Mikamo & Shintarō Inokawa	Keiichi Sekino	January 22, 2023	May 17, 2026
Though Naruhaya's shot hits the post, Barou takes possession and scores. Next round, Isagi passes to Nagi as they rush the net, where he scores. Barou shoots from kick-off again, but Nagi blocks it; Isagi takes possession, but Naruhaya steals it, passing to Barou to score. Isagi realizes that Naruhaya always positions himself in his blind spot, allowing him to get close unnoticed, similar to Rin. Nagi scores again, tying the game. It is revealed that Naruhaya's desire to succeed stems from wanting to support his struggling family after their parents' deaths. Barou tries once more to shoot from kick-off but is blocked; emulating Isagi's Direct Shot, Naruhaya shoots but hits the post. Nagi takes possession, and Isagi heads to the net, causing Barou to follow him. Seeing Barou change targets, Isagi sprints to the net, emulating Naruhaya's footwork; Nagi passes the ball and Isagi scores, winning the match. Naruhaya laments his missed shot; Isagi claims either team could have won, but Naruhaya declares him the superior player. Isagi selects Barou to join the team but thanks Naruhaya for helping him improve. On the previous day, angered that Bachira and Isagi had left them, Kunigami and Chigiri approach Reo to join them, who accepts in order to defeat Nagi for leaving him.
16	16	"Tri-Fusion"; Transliteration: "Torai-Sesshon" (Japanese: 三者融合(トライ・セッション))	Kōhei Kuratomi	Shigeru Morikawa	January 29, 2023	May 24, 2026
At a JFU meeting, Anri reports that in Blue Lock, different players going against and working with each other is how they will find the best. The board disagrees and wants the most talented player available. Ego criticizes them for wanting someone who may seem successful but will suffer due to a lack of preparation. To him, talent isn't being born with gifts or physicality but the skills to improve them. Isagi and Nagi learn that Barou is particular in maintaining a regimen, be it cleanliness or intense training; his self-discipline is the key to his developed shooting and physique. At the public bath, Isagi is surprised to see Kunigami and Chigiri are still in the third stage. Joined by the rest of their teams, all agree to play each other. Isagi decides to be the link between Nagi and Barou since both refuse to cooperate. Meanwhile, Tokimitsu and Aryu struggle to find a team unafraid to play them, and Bachira attempts to show Rin that soccer can be enjoyable, not just a competition. At the match's start, Barou takes the ball, and Kunigami marks him. His refusal to pass allows Reo to bypass Isagi and steal the ball, passing it to Chigiri. He outpaces Nagi and scores the first goal.
17	17	"Donkey"; Transliteration: "Hetakuso" (Japanese: ヘタクソ)	Yūsuke Onoda & Shintarō Inokawa	Kiyoshi Okuyama & Chihiro Nitta	February 5, 2023	May 31, 2026
Isagi passes to Barou intent on scoring, but his refusal to pass it back allows Kunigami to score. Next round, he passes to Nagi instead, who is able to avoid Chigiri and score. Isagi once again tries to work with Barou, who declares he'd rather lose than change his play. Nonetheless, Barou angrily admits that he is not winning with his skills. Next round, as Reo takes possession, Isagi realizes he is the link between Kunigami and Chigiri since his skills are balanced, not specialized; Chigiri takes it and passes in front of the net, where Kunigami headers a goal. Isagi decides that instead of adapting to Barou, he will force him to follow instead. He pretends to pass to him, tricking Barou and his opponents and allowing Nagi to take possession. Surrounded and with Barou calling for the ball, Nagi passes to an unimpeded Isagi, and he scores. Next round, Barou takes the ball but is marked by Kunigami and Reo; Isagi takes the ball and passes it to Nagi, who scores. However, Chigiri uses a new gentle kick to avoid slowing down while dribbling and scores by himself. Elsewhere, in the 3rd stage, Junichi Wanima decides to team up with Raichi and Gagamaru.
18	18	"The Stage for the Lead"; Transliteration: "Shuyaku no Sutēji" (Japanese: 主役の座(ステージ))	Hiroshi Kimura & Fukutarō Hattori	EdgeWorks & Isowa Yuri	February 12, 2023	June 14, 2026
With Isagi's team down one point, Barou shoots the ball at the goal directly from the kickoff and misses. Kunigami gets the loose ball and passes it to Reo, who tries to pass it to Chigiri but is marked by Barou. He thinks about taking the shot but instead passes to Isagi, who ties the game. Isagi and Nagi then strategize without telling Barou their plan, while Barou sorts out his feelings. Play resumes with Reo taking the ball and trying to pass it to Chigiri after running behind Nagi towards the net, but Nagi intercepts the pass, and Barou gets the loose ball. He goes down the pitch having awakened and fakes out Kunigami with a chop, then Reo with another chop, and then scores the match-winning goal. Afterwards, Barou explains to Isagi and Nagi that he had been the lead actor on the pitch this whole time, but those two were the first to steal the lead away from him. While watching the match, Ego explains to Anri that dealing with defeat is a critical aspect, as Barou demonstrated resilience in that match. Isagi decides on which team member to select with a match against Bachira looming.
19	19	"Dancing Boy"	Norio Kashima	Yasushi Muroya	February 19, 2023	June 21, 2026
Isagi chooses Chigiri, believing he can generate the greatest chemical reaction. Nagi unexpectedly ends his friendship with Reo as he and Kunigami move back to the second stage, while Isagi, Nagi, Barou, and Chigiri move up to the fourth stage to face Bachira, Rin, Aryu, and Tokimitsu. As Isagi's team rests inside the break room, Isagi and Barou talk about the kind of soccer they want to play, as Barou asks in order to devour his skills in the next match. Meanwhile, as Bachira prepares, he looks back at his life as he was hooked on soccer from an early age and largely played soccer alone due to other boys seeing him as a monster, and his mother is a famous painter. After painting a picture for Bachira, he began to imagine a monster and played against it when playing alone. He was invited to Blue Lock, where he can play soccer the way he wants. Isagi leaves the break room and encounters Rin and Bachira in the hallway, declaring that he will win and get Bachira back.
20	20	"Super Link-Up Play"; Transliteration: "Chō Rendō" (Japanese: 超連動)	Takayuki Tanaka & Noriyoshi Sasaki	Kiyoshi Okuyama & Chihiro Nitta	February 26, 2023	June 28, 2026
The match between Isagi's team, in white, and Rin's team, in red, begins with Bachira taking the kickoff, and after making an unconventional move, Isagi steals the ball. He passes to Nagi, who then passes to a spot expecting Chigiri to get there with his speed. He gets the ball and scores to give Team White the first point. On the next possession, Isagi has Bachira tightly marked, but Bachira gets the ball away with a no-look pass that Aryu gets to first, passing to Tokimitsu to set up Rin, who had precisely calculated the turn of events to score. After a break to strategize, with Isagi explaining how Rin's vision is exceptional, Isagi attempts to sneak out and receive a long pass from Chigiri while the opponents are focused on Nagi, but Rin is not fooled and intercepts the pass. He passes to Bachira, who passes high to where only Aryu can reach it, allowing him to score. Nagi reflects on how Bachira is making him all fired up. On the next possession, Team White executes the same play, but this time to set Nagi up. Nagi receives the pass and, after faking Rin out, uses the opportunity to score to tie the match at 2–2.
21	21	"I'm Not There"; Transliteration: "Ore ga Inai" (Japanese: 俺がいない)	Kōhei Kuratomi	Barnstorm Design Labo & Yoshikazu Miyao	March 5, 2023	July 5, 2026
Watching the match, Anri considers Nagi's goal to be a miracle, which Ego counterargues. With the match tied, play continues with Rin passing the ball to Tokimitsu, who passes it to Aryu, then to Rin. He then fakes a pass to Bachira to get Isagi out of position, allowing him to score. Team White strategizes as they look for a way to get out of Rin's vision. Play resumes as Team White deploys their tactic to try and set up Isagi from Rin's blind spot, but he anticipates the move and sneaks up in front of Isagi. However, Barou steals the ball from Isagi, with Rin failing to account for his selfish playing style, allowing him to tie the game. On the ensuing kickoff, Nagi and Chigiri swap marking assignments. They both mark Bachira to confuse Team Red, allowing Barou to steal the ball and break away. However, Rin quickly reacts to Barou and manages to knock the ball out of bounds to stop Barou's goal-scoring attempt. Play resumes with a throw-in, and Team Red takes advantage of Team White's fatigue and Tokimitsu's freshness as he takes the ball and breaks away, leading to Barou and Chigiri committing fouls that get them yellow cards. On the free kick, Rin shoots the ball that arcs precisely over Isagi and drops into the net to give Team Red the 4–3 lead.
22	22	"Voice"; Transliteration: "Koe" (Japanese: 声)	Kazuki Yokoyama	Kiyoshi Okuyama & Chihiro Nitta	March 12, 2023	July 12, 2026
Play resumes with Isagi taking the kickoff and passing to Chigiri after outrunning Aryu for the ball. Isagi positions himself after a diagonal move to create an opening. Rin sneaks up behind Isagi to try and take the ball away, but having correctly anticipated this course of action, he turns his back towards the goal and shoots with his back heel to tie the match at 4–4, with the next goal deciding the winner. Play resumes with Tokimitsu taking the kickoff and passing the ball to Rin, who passes it high to Aryu to take advantage of his high-jumping ability, and Aryu passes to Bachira. Chigiri steals the ball from Bachira, and Isagi and Barou pass the ball back and forth. Bachira makes a tackle attempt at Isagi after hearing his inner voice, but Isagi dodges it and shoots the ball. At the last second, Rin blocks the shot with his head. Bachira takes the ball the other way and, in doing so, shakes off the monster inside him in order to score himself. Bachira shoots, but his shot is blocked by Isagi.
23	23	"Luck"	Hiroshi Kimura & Fukutarō Hattori	Kōhei Kuratomi	March 19, 2023	July 19, 2026
The ball lands in front of Rin, allowing him to take the winning goal for his team. He selects Isagi to join them, in order to defeat him one day. Though disheartened, Chigiri, Barou, and Nagi refuse Isagi's words of support and allow him to take his place with Rin's team. Isagi asks Rin how he had surpassed him in order to understand, but Rin answers that it was simply luck. Ego lectures them on the topic, stating that luck is not just coincidental but an element they can utilize, noting how Rin took the chance of running to where he believed the ball might land when it could have been anywhere. The team now faces the World Five: Spain's Leonardo Luna, England's Adam Blake, Argentina's Pablo Cabassos, Brazil's Dada Silva, and France's prodigious star Julian Loki. During a break, Isagi asks Rin about his relationship with his brother, who states they are not antagonistic with each other but competitive. At the match's kick-off, Bachira dribbles past Cabassos and gives it to Rin, who lands the first goal against the Five.
24	24	"The Time Has Come"; Transliteration: "Toki wa Kitari" (Japanese: 時は来たり)	Tetsuaki Watanabe, Kōhei Kuratomi & Shintarō Inokawa	Tetsuaki Watanabe, Chihiro Nitta & Kiyoshi Okuyama	March 26, 2023	July 26, 2026
Despite scoring the first goal, the team is overwhelmed by the World Five's superior skills and loses. While Isagi, Bachira, Aryu, and Tokimitsu are disappointed, Rin takes the loss poorly. At a JFU meeting, Blue Lock is nearly canceled due to high spending and a lack of faith from board members. Ego decides to show them the outcome of Blue Lock's training and offers a proposal. After playing the Five, the team moves to the second stage of the selection and meets the remaining six teams. Among them are Nagi, Barou, Chigiri, Zantetsu, Niko, Raichi, Gagamaru, Wanima, Igarashi, and Reo. Isagi asks Reo about Kunigami after seeing he was not selected, but the last player to appear, the eccentric and aggressive Ryusei Shidou, antagonizes him by stating he was the one to disqualify Kunigami, earning Chigiri and Bachira's ire. Ego informs the finalists about a change with the next selection, now a match between them and Japan's U20 team, which includes Rin's brother Sae. If they lose, the program will be shut down, but if they win, they can supersede the team's positions. Ego remarks about his faith in them, dearly believing they can win.

== Home media release ==
=== Japanese ===
Bandai Namco Filmworks (Japan – Region 2/A)
Vol.	Episodes	Cover character(s)	Release date	Ref.
1	1–6	Yoichi Isagi and Meguru Bachira	January 27, 2023	
2	7–12	Rensuke Kunigami and Hyōma Chigiri	March 24, 2023	
3	13–18	Seishiro Nagi and Reo Mikage	May 26, 2023	
4	19–24	Yoichi Isagi and Rin Itoshi	July 28, 2023	

=== English ===
Crunchyroll, LLC (North America – Region 1/A)
Part	Episodes	Release date	Ref.
1	1–12	November 14, 2023	
2	13–24	May 28, 2024	
