= Blue Lock season 2 =

Season of anime television series

Blue Lock
- Season 2
- First Blu-ray volume cover
- No. of episodes: 14

Release
- Original network: TV Asahi
- Original release: October 5 – December 28, 2024

Season chronology
- ← Previous; Season 1

Blue Lock is an anime television series based on the manga series by Muneyuki Kaneshiro and illustrated by Yusuke Nomura. The second season is produced by Eight Bit and directed by Yūji Haibara, Taku Kishimoto overseeing the series' scripts, Kenji Tanabe providing the main character designs and serving as chief animation director along with Tomoko Mori and Sorato Shimizu, Tadayoshi Okimura serving as action director, and Jun Murayama composing the music. Titled vs. U-20 Japan, the season aired from October 5 to December 28, 2024, on TV Asahi's brand new IMAnimation block. It adapts volumes 13–17 of the manga (chapters 109–149/151). (Note: Chapters 95–108 from volumes 12 to mid-13, adapts the "Third Selection" story arc, if not the focus of "U-20 Japan" arc throughout a season.)

The season follows Yoichi Isagi and the other players who survived and advanced to the next stage of Blue Lock program, facing the biggest challenge to keep the program alive as the players proven their skills in an attempt to be chosen for the upcoming match.

The opening theme song is "Bōjaku no Charisma" (傍若のカリスマ, Bōjaku no Karisuma), performed by Unison Square Garden, while the ending theme song is "One", by Snow Man.

Crunchyroll licensed the season, and is streaming an English dub starting on October 18, 2024. Medialink licensed the season in Asia-Pacific.

== Episodes ==
No. overall	No. in season	Title	Directed by (Note: Production staff information is taken from the ending credits of each episode.)	Storyboarded by	Original release date
25	1	"Tryouts"; Transliteration: "Toraiauto" (Japanese: 適性試験(トライアウト))	Masahiro Amano & Ryōtarō Honda	Kiyoshi Okuyama & Chihiro Nitta	October 6, 2024 (Note: This episode aired at 12:00 a.m. JST, 30 minutes after the original air time on TV Asahi.)
In a flashback, Rin is challenged by Sae, who criticizes his lack of progression compared to him. Ego addresses the finalists and informs them that the match will be held in three week's time. He then names the top six players: Rin, Shidou, Tabito Karasu, Eita Otoya, Kenyu Yukimiya, and Nagi. He explains that three teams will be formed based on a pair of the six and the choosing of the remaining finalists. In a rotational match format, three players will join a pair once and face another group in a test to find who can synergize the most effectively with them; as the runner-up, Bachira will play twice. This will determine spots for the final team. Initially, Isagi has difficulty choosing who he will play with, deciding between what he knows and what he could learn; after chatting with Bachira, Barou, Niko, and Reo, he chooses to play with Rin and Shidou, as does Bachira. At the same time, Rin and Shidou clash over an intense mutual dislike. Angered by the match, the JFU resolve to crush Blue Lock no matter what; U20 team captain Oliver Aiku accepts the challenge. The U20 Japan VS. Blue Lock Match will begin.
26	2	"The Assassin and the Ninja"; Transliteration: "Koroshi-ya to Ninja" (Japanese: 殺し屋と忍者)	Fukutarō Hattori & Hiroshi Kimura	Chihiro Nitta, Akemi Nakajima & Chisaki Satō	October 12, 2024
In the first match, Rin and Shidou are joined by Nijiro Nanase, Yo Hiori, and Isagi, facing Karasu, Otoya, Shiguma Kyohei, Saramadara Kairu, and Chigiri. At kick off, Shidou is guarded and passes to Isagi, who gives it to Rin. Chigiri intercepts them but Shidou steals the ball and scores the first goal. In the next play, Karasu, having analyzed his opponents, takes the ball and scores his team's first point. Next play, Karasu is cornered and passes to Otoya, who sneaks behind everyone and takes the ball to score. Rin, in the next play, ignores everyone to curve a shot for a second point. The rest of the players realize they must assert themselves to the top four. Chigiri shows his speed to an impressed Karasu, who passes to him; he evades Rin to pass it to Otoya for a third point. In the next play, Hiori passes to Rin but Shidou collides with him; Chigiri takes the loose ball and passes it to Otoya, who gives it to Karasu for a fourth goal. Isagi, watching Shidou and Rin fight, realizes he can use their incompatibility to his advantage.
27	3	"The World You Feel"; Transliteration: "Kanjiru Sekai" (Japanese: 感じる世界)	Mitsutoshi Satō	Chihiro Nitta & Kiyoshi Okuyama	October 19, 2024
Isagi sees Shidou in an impossible position and passes to him, thinking he'll pass the ball back, but Shidou shoots anyway and scores, making the score 4-3 for Team B. Hiori hits a cross towards Isagi, who misses the ball. Rin gets the loose ball, gets past Karasu and scores the equalizer. To score the last goal, Hiori encourages Isagi to think reflexively. Shidou intercepts a pass from Karasu to Chigiri, and Hiori makes a pass for either Rin or Shidou. Isagi gets in his flow state and manages to get between the two of them, steal the ball, and shoot the winning goal for Team A. Meanwhile, Reo is chosen as a player on Team C for the next match.
28	4	"Chameleon"; Transliteration: "Kamereon" (Japanese: カメレオン)	Yuki Nishiyama	Chisaki Satō, Chihiro Nitta & Kiyoshi Okuyama	October 26, 2024
The second match starts, with Rin and Shidou joined by Aryu, Igarashi and Yukio Ishikari, against Yukimiya and Nagi, who are joined by Reo, Gagamaru and Shingen Tanaka. Gagamaru intercepts Igarashi's pass to Shidou, and Yukimiya gets the ball, dribbling past both Rin and Shidou. Yukimiya proceeds to shoot a long-range gyro shot, which ends with Nagi trapping the ball and scoring the first goal. Rin scores the equalizer with an aerial assist from Aryu. Reo surpasses his limits and, instead of passing to Nagi, he shoots a copy of Yukimiya's gyro shot, and manages to score, introducing his brand new Chameleon playstyle. Despite that, Rin's team ends up winning the match 5-3, with Reo still unhappy with his current level. Meanwhile Sae, in a meeting with the JFU chairman and U20 team manager, is unhappy with the quality of players on the U20 team, especially the forwards. He threatens to leave the team, but decides to stay after stating that there's a player in Blue Lock he wants to team up with.
29	5	"Flow"	Hiroshi Kimura & Fukutarō Hattori	Chisaki Satō	November 2, 2024
After the final match of the tryouts ends with Rin scoring the last goal, Shidou violently attacks Rin and gets him bleeding, forcing Ego to remotely electrocute Shidou. Ego gathers all the Blue Lock players and announces the Blue Lock 11 team lineup, consisting of Gagamaru as the goalkeeper, Aryu, Niko, Bachira and Chigiri in defense, Karasu, Otoya, Yukimiya, Nagi and Isagi in midfield and Rin as the center forward and captain. Upon being questioned why Shidou wasn't on the team despite being the second best player, Ego reveals that Sae Itoshi chose Shidou to join him on the U20 Japan team. In the U20 training camp, Sae tells the U20 players not to disappoint him, and Shidou starts a fight with the U20 team's star striker Shuto Sendou, considering him a waste of a striker, only to get stopped by U20 defender and captain Oliver Aiku. Meanwhile, Ego proceeds to teach his players about the flow state, declaring that Blue Lock reaching it will be key to winning the match.
30	6	"The Big Stage"; Transliteration: "Ōbutai" (Japanese: 大舞台)	Kenji Yasuda	Suzuka Yoshida, Chihiro Nitta & Kiyoshi Okuyama	November 9, 2024
31	7	"Itoshi Sae"; Transliteration: "Itoshi Sae" (Japanese: 糸師 冴)	Yūsuke Kamata & Kentarō Sugimoto	Katsumi Terahigashi	November 16, 2024
32	8	"Blue Genes"; Transliteration: "Ao no Idenshi" (Japanese: 青の遺伝子)	Mitsutoshi Satō	Kiyoshi Okuyama & Chihiro Nitta	November 23, 2024
33	9	"Night Snow"; Transliteration: "Naito Sunō" (Japanese: ナイトスノウ)	Hiroshi Kimura & Fukutarō Hattori	Masashi Kojima	December 1, 2024
34	10	"The Subs Take to the Stage"; Transliteration: "Kōtai Geki" (Japanese: 交代劇)	Aya Ikeda	Chisaki Satō	December 8, 2024 (Note: This episode aired at 12:30 a.m. JST, 1 hour after the original air time on TV Asahi.)
Shidou subs into the U20 team and coordinates with Sendou. After a pass from Sae, Shidou gets fouled by Niko, who gets a yellow card, earning the U20s a free kick. Sae takes the free kick and passes to Shidou. Despite Chigiri's attempt to intercept the pass, Shidou scores the equalizer with a jumping volley. Ego makes two substitutions for Blue Lock, replacing Chigiri and Niko with Hiori and Reo. Hiori and Nagi's passing leads to an Isagi attack, which is stopped by Aiku. On the counter, Shidou is about to get the ball, but he gets stopped by Reo, who copies Aiku's abilities with his Chameleon Defense.
35	11	"What You Taught Us"; Transliteration: "Oshieta Koto" (Japanese: 教えた感情(コト))	Shin Tosaka	Kiyoshi Okuyama & Chihiro Nitta	December 14, 2024
After being shut down by Reo, Shidou receives a cross from Sae, only for Gagamaru to intercept it and head the ball away. Shidou awakens his flow state and jumps, shooting a long range bicycle kick and scoring to make it 3-2 for the Japan U20s. Isagi asks Ego what to do to win, insisting that neither he nor anyone else wants to give up on the match. Ego decides to sub in Barou, replacing Otoya. After the restart, Isagi has the ball stolen from him by Barou, who uses his chop dribbles to pass the U20 defense, and shoots, but the shot hits the post. Yukimiya gets the ball, and shoots his gyro shot, only for Aiku, who has now entered flow state himself, to block it at the last moment.
36	12	"Flowers"; Transliteration: "Hana" (Japanese: 花)	Mitsutoshi Satō	Chihiro Nitta & Kiyoshi Okuyama	December 21, 2024
After Aiku remembers his past of wanting to be a striker, but being forced to change and become a defender, a U20 counterattack leads to Gagamaru blocking Shidou's shot with a handstand block. Reo clears away the ball by copying Nagi's trapping abilities, and in the counter, Isagi uses Karasu and Nagi to get himself through on goal, only to be met by Sae, who throws him off balance, leaving him unable to shoot. Isagi makes a desperate pass to Rin, who is marked by Aiku, only for Barou to steal the ball and score the equalizer with a sliding shot. Barou gets a yellow card for removing his shirt, as he, Nagi, Isagi and Rin all declare they will score the winning goal.
37	13	"Not Alone"; Transliteration: "Hitori Janai" (Japanese: ひとりじゃない)	Yūsuke Kamata & Daisuke Tsukushi	Chihiro Nitta, Kiyoshi Okuyama & Chisaki Satō	December 28, 2024 (Note: Episodes 13 and 14 premiered back-to-back, with Episode 13 airing 30 mins earlier than the original air time on TV Asahi.)
Sae enters his flow state and announces he's raising the level of the game, proceeding to dribble past the entire Blue Lock team single-handedly. Rin manages to stop his pass to Shidou, but gets his face kicked by Shidou in the process. On the counter, Isagi passes to Bachira, who solo dribbles past the entire U20 defense with his monster trance, including Aiku and the goalkeeper, only for Sendou to clear his shot at the last moment. Sae reaches Blue Lock's box, and makes a surprise pass to Aiku, who reminds that he used to be a striker, but his shot gets blocked by Rin, leading to a corner. Rin thinks Sae will pass to Aiku from the corner, but he passes to Shidou instead. Rin thinks he's been completely defeated, but Isagi stops Shidou and clears the ball away. Angered that Isagi didn't even let him lose to Sae in peace, Rin starts thinking that he's not alone, and has all of Blue Lock supporting him, before saying he finds that disgusting, entering his flow state and declaring he'll mangle Isagi.
38	14	"Last Attack"; Transliteration: "Owari Geki" (Japanese: 終撃)	Kentarō Sugimoto & Hajime Nihira	Kiyoshi Okuyama, Chisaki Satō & Hajime Nihira	December 28, 2024
Rin, now in his destructive flow state, tears through the U20 team's defense, and challenges Aiku, who gets backup from Shidou. Rin shoots, but Aiku gets a touch, causing the shot to hit the post, with Sae taking possession with one minute of additional time left. Isagi, Barou and Nagi try to stop Sae, but he effortlessly dribbles past all three of them. Rin clashes with Sae as the clock winds down on the match, deflecting the ball as Sae tries to nutmeg it. While Aiku tries to defend, Isagi, having predicted that Rin would do this, manages to get the ball and scores, winning the U20 Japan game. In a post-match interview, Isagi states that he will lead Japan to victory in the U20 world cup, and Ego declares that Phase 1 of Blue Lock is complete. Afterwards, Isagi tries to thank Rin, saying the goal belonged to the both of them together, but Rin is furious, and formally declares Isagi his rival, while a changed Kunigami returns from the Wild Card program. Elsewhere, a blond man with a blue rose tattoo on his neck answers a call from Ego, telling Blue Lock to get on their knees.

== Home media release ==
=== Japanese ===
Bandai Namco Filmworks (Japan – Region 2/A)
Vol.	Episodes	Cover character(s)	Release date	Ref.
1	25–31	Yoichi Isagi, Yō Hiori and Nijirō Nanase	March 26, 2025	
2	32–38	Rin and Sae Itoshi	May 28, 2025	

=== English ===
Crunchyroll, LLC (North America – Region 1/A)
Part	Episodes	Release date	Ref.
1	25–38	January 13, 2026	
