= List of Blue Lock chapters =

Blue Lock is a Japanese manga series written by Muneyuki Kaneshiro and illustrated by Yusuke Nomura. It started in Kodansha's Weekly Shōnen Magazine on August 1, 2018. Kodansha has collected its chapters into individual tankōbon volumes. The first volume was released on November 16, 2018. As of November 17, 2026, 42 volumes have been released. . The next one should be out fairly soonIn January 2021, Kodansha USA announced that they have licensed the manga for English digital release in North America, starting on March 16, 2021. In January 2022, Kodansha USA announced that they would release the manga in print.

A spin-off manga focusing on Seishiro Nagi, titled Blue Lock: Episode Nagi, was serialized in Kodansha's Bessatsu Shōnen Magazine from June 9, 2022, to July 9, 2025. The spin-off is written by Muneyuki Kaneshiro and illustrated by Kōta Sannomiya. Its chapters were collected in eight tankōbon volumes, released from October 17, 2022, to August 12, 2025. In October 2023, Kodansha USA announced that the manga is planned to be published in print. The first volume was released on October 15, 2024.

== Blue Lock volumes ==
No.	Original release date	Original ISBN	English release date	English ISBN
1	November 16, 2018	978-4-06-513400-9	March 16, 2021 (digital); June 21, 2022 (print)	978-1-64-651654-4
1. "Dream" (夢, Yume); 2. "Moving In" (入寮, Nyūryō); 3. "Monster" (かいぶつ, Kaibutsu); 4. "Right Now" (今こそ, Ima Koso)
2	January 17, 2019	978-4-06-514121-2	April 20, 2021 (digital); August 30, 2022 (print)	978-1-64-651655-1
5. "The "Zero" Soccer" (サッカーの0, Sakkā no Zero); 6. "1 = Individual" (1 = 個性, Ichi = Kosei); 7. "We'll Meet in Front of the Goal" (ゴール前で逢おう, Gōru Mae de Aō); 8. "Message" (啓示(メッセージ), Messēji); 9. "Superhero" (スーパーヒーロー, Sūpāhīrō); 10. "Operation: Me, Next 9" (次俺9作戦, Tsugi Ore Nain Sakusen); 11. "Premonition & Intuition" (予感と直感, Yokan to Chokkan); 12. "Signal" (合図(スイッチ), Suitchi); 13. "The One to Be Reborn" (生まれ変わるのは, Umarekawaru no wa)
3	March 15, 2019	978-4-06-514447-3	May 18, 2021 (digital); October 25, 2022 (print)	978-1-64-651656-8
14. "Resolve" (覚悟, Kakugo); 15. "Spiral" (螺旋(スパイラル), Supairaru); 16. "One Shot" (一撃, Ichigeki); 17. "Sorry" (ごめん, Gomen); 18. "Thanks for the Help" (おつかれ, Otsukare); 19. "Overwhelming Disadvantage" (圧倒的不利(ディスアドバンテージ), Disuadobantēji); 20. "Boiling" (滾り, Tagiri); 21. "Break Through!" (ブチ抜け!, Buchinuke!); 22. "Until This Fire Burns Out" (この熱が尽きるまで, Kono Netsu ga Tsukiru Made)
4	June 17, 2019	978-4-06-515450-2	June 15, 2021 (digital); December 20, 2022 (print)	978-1-64-651657-5
23. "Until They Met" (出逢うまでは, Deau Made wa); 24. "Goal Formula" (成功(ゴール)の方程式, Gōru no Hōtei Shiki); 25. "Trick" (法則(カラクリ), Karakuri); 26. "Last Game"; 27. "Only One" (ただひとり, Tada Hitori); 28. "Super Special" (スーパースペシャル, Sūpā Supesharu); 29. "Flash of Evolution" (進化の一閃, Shinka no Issen); 30. "Extreme Frenzy" (極限の熱狂, Kyokugen no Nekkyō); 31. "Awakening" (覚醒, Kakusei)
5	August 16, 2019	978-4-06-516336-8	July 20, 2021 (digital); February 21, 2023 (print)	978-1-64-651662-9
32. "Impetus" (衝動, Shōdō); 33. "Attack Waves" (波状攻撃, Hajō Kōgeki); 34. "At This Rate" (このままで, Kono Mama de); 35. "Last Chance" (ラストチャンス, Rasuto Chansu); 36. "Right Here" (いまここにある, Ima Koko ni Aru); 37. "The Last Piece" (最後の欠片(ピース), Saigo no Pīsu); 38. "More" (もっと, Motto); 39. "Hungry" (飢餓(ハングリー), Hangurī); 40. "Second Selection" (二次選考(セレクション), Ni-ji Serekushon)
6	October 17, 2019	978-4-06-517167-7	August 17, 2021 (digital); April 18, 2023 (print)	978-1-64-651663-6
41. "Blue Lock Man"; 42. "About-Face" (一変, Ippen); 43. "Three-Man Teams" (3人1組, Sannin Ichikumi); 44. "Rivalry Battle" (奪敵決戦(ライバルリー・バトル), Raibarurī Batoru); 45. "Battle to the Death" (殺し合い, Koroshiai); 46. "Top 3"; 47. "Chemical Reaction" (化学反応, Kagaku Han'nō); 48. "The Beauty of the Parabola" (その放物線の美しさに, Sono Hōbutsusen no Utsukushi-sa ni); 49. "After the Parting" (別離の後先, Betsuri no Atosaki)
7	January 17, 2020	978-4-06-517887-4	September 21, 2021 (digital); June 27, 2023 (print)	978-1-64-651664-3
50. "Match Confirmed" (試合(マッチング)成立, Macchingu Seiritsu); 51. "Creator" (創造主, Sōzōshu); 52. "Talent and Mediocrity" (天才と凡才, Tensai to Bonsai); 53. "Blind Spot" (死角, Shikaku); 54. "Devour" (喰(くらう), Kurau); 55. "A Dream That Won't Come True" (叶わない夢, Kanawanai Yume); 56. "Proof I've Wagered My Life" (人生を懸けた証明, Jinsei o Kaketa Shōmei); 57. "Chance Encounter" (邂逅, Kaikō); 58. "The Battle Begins" (決戦の火蓋, Kessen no Hibuta)
8	March 17, 2020	978-4-06-518559-9	October 19, 2021 (digital); August 29, 2023 (print)	978-1-64-651665-0
59. "Triple Combo" (三者融合(トライ・セッション), Torai Sesshon); 60. "Field Vision" (戦場視界(フィールド・ビジョン), Fīrudo Bijon); 61. "Leverage" (生かす, Ikasu); 62. "Loser" (ヘタクソ, Hetakuso); 63. "Buried Ego" (埋もれる人間(エゴ), Umoreru Ego); 64. "The Lead Actor's Stage" (主役の座(ステージ), Sutēji); 65. "Trick of Fate" (運命の悪戯, Unmei no Itazura); 66. "Loser's Crossroads" (敗北者の岐路, Haiboku-sha no Kiro); 67. "Power of Despair" (絶望の才能, Zetsubō no Sainō)
9	May 15, 2020	978-4-06-518854-5	November 16, 2021 (digital); October 17, 2023 (print)	978-1-64-651666-7
68. "Promise" (約束, Yakusoku); 69. "Chaos" (大混沌(カオス), Kaosu); 70. "Dancing Boy"; 71. "Friends" (ともだち, Tomodachi); 72. "Match Up!!"; 73. "Ultra-Coordination" (超連動, Chō Rendō); 74. "Monster" (異次元選手(モンスター), Monsutā); 75. "Wild Dance" (乱舞, Ranbu); 76. "Can't Go Back" (もう戻れない, Mōmodorenai)
10	August 17, 2020	978-4-06-520360-6	December 21, 2021 (digital); December 26, 2023 (print)	978-1-64-651667-4
77. "All-Out" (本気, Honki); 78. "Irregular" (イレギュラー, Iregyurā); 79. "I'm Not There" (俺がいない, Ore ga Inai); 80. "Unlimited" (無限界(ノーリミット), Nō Rimitto); 81. "Last Action" (最終行動(ラスト・アクション), Rasuto Akushon); 82. "I Don't Need You" (いらない, Iranai); 83. "Voice" (声, Koe); 84. "Initial Impulse" (初期衝動, Shoki Shōdō); 85. "Eight Seconds Ago" (8秒前, Hachi-byō Mae)
11	October 16, 2020	978-4-06-521018-5	January 18, 2022 (digital); February 27, 2024 (print)	978-1-64-651668-1
86. "Pride" (誇り, Hokori); 87. "Luck"; 88. "World All-Stars" (世界選抜, Sekai Senbatsu); 89. "Demon" (悪魔, Akuma); 90. "Third Selection" (三次選考(セレクション), Sanji Serekushon); 91. "Divine Speed" (神速, Shinsoku); 92. "The Closest" (一番近くで, Ichiban Chikaku de); 93. "Gathering" (集結, Shūketsu); 94. "The Time Has Come" (時は来たり, Toki wa Kitari)
12	December 17, 2020	978-4-06-521638-5	March 15, 2022 (digital); April 30, 2024 (print)	978-1-64-651669-8
95. "Tryouts" (適性試験(トライアウト), Toraiauto); 96. "Chosen Path" (選んだ道, Eranda Michi); 97. "Last Ticket" (最終切符, Saishū Kippu); 98. "Villain" (曲者(クセモノ), Kusemono); 99. "The Assassin and the Ninja" (殺し屋と忍者, Koroshi-ya to Ninja); 100. "Optimal X Supreme = Worst" (Saiteki × Saikō = Saiaku); 101. "New Relation" (新しい関係性(カタチ), Atarashī Katachi); 102. "The World of Feeling" (感じる世界, Kanjiru Sekai); 103. "Total Sensory Experience" (全感覚体験, Zen Kankaku Taiken)
13	March 17, 2021	978-4-06-522073-3	May 17, 2022 (digital); June 25, 2024 (print)	978-1-64-651670-4
104. "Trance" (夢中(トリップ), Torippu); 105. "5×6"; 106. "Chameleon" (カメレオン, Kamereon); 107. "All Matches Over" (全試合終了, Zen Shiai Shūryō); 108. "Top 11" (11傑, Jūichi Ketsu); 109. "Battle Group" (戦闘集団, Sentō Shūdan); 110. "Newcomer" (新参者, Shinsanmono); 111. "Flow"; 112. "Grand Stage" (大舞台, Ōbutai)
14	May 17, 2021	978-4-06-523148-7	July 19, 2022 (digital); August 27, 2024 (print)	978-1-64-651671-1
113. "Cops and Robbers" (泥棒と警察, Dorobō to Keisatsu); 114. "Quartet" (カルテット, Karutetto); 115. "Sae Itoshi" (糸師 冴, Itoshi Sae); 116. "Revenger" (復讐者(リベンジャー), Ribenjā); 117. "Nice to Meet You" (はじめまして, Hajimemashite); 118. "Warped" (歪, Ibitsu); 119. "Third Arrow" (第三の矢, Dai San no Ya); 120. "Blue Genes" (青の遺伝子, Ao no Idenshi); 121. "1st Half"
15	August 17, 2021	978-4-06-524479-1	September 20, 2022 (digital); October 29, 2024 (print)	978-1-64-651672-8
122. "Headliner" (ヘッドライナー, Heddorainā); 123. "World's Best" (世界一, Sekaiichi); 124. "Night Snow" (ナイトスノウ, Naito Sunō); 125. "Ruin" (ぐちゃぐちゃ, Guchagucha); 126. "Second Half"; 127. "Dragon Drive" (ドラゴン・ドライヴ, Doragon Doraivu); 128. "Dramatic Exchange" (交代劇, Kōtai Geki); 129. "Cool Head and Chameleon" (冷徹と変幻, Reitetsu to Hengen); 130. "The World Doesn't Know Me Yet" (世界はまだ俺を知らない, Sekai wa Mada Ore o Shiranai); 131. "What You Taught Us" (教えた感情(コト), Oshieta Koto)
16	October 15, 2021	978-4-06-525141-6	November 15, 2022 (digital); December 31, 2024 (print)	978-1-64-651673-5
132. "Dictator" (独裁の王, Dokusai no Ō); 133. "Extreme Focus" (極限集中, Kyokugen Shūchū); 134. "Flowers" (花, Hana); 135. "Shachihoko" (鯱(シャチホコ)); 136. "Culmination" (集大成, Shūtaisei); 137. "Last Step" (最後の一歩, Saigo no Ippo); 138. "One Mind in Two Bodies" (一心同体, Isshindōtai); 139. "Synchronize" (シンクロ, Shinkuro); 140. "Essence" (真髄, Shinzui)
17	December 17, 2021	978-4-06-526286-3	January 17, 2023 (digital); February 25, 2025 (print)	978-1-64-651674-2
141. "Monster Trance" (怪物夢中(モンスタートランス), Monsutā Toransu); 142. "World Standard" (世界標準(ワールドスタンダード), Wārudo Sutandādo); 143. "Not Alone" (ひとりじゃない, Hitori Janai); 144. "Disposition" (性癖, Seiheki); 145. "Born Slippy"; 146. "Final Match-up"; 147. "Last Attack" (終撃, Shūgeki); 148. "Declaration" (宣言, Sengen); 149. "Complete" (計画完遂(コンプリート), Konpurīto)
18	March 17, 2022	978-4-06-527288-6	March 21, 2023 (digital); April 29, 2025 (print)	978-1-64-651755-8
150. "Holiday" (休暇, Kyūka); 151. "Changing World" (変わる世界, Kawaru Sekai); 152. "Restart" (再始動, Saishidō); 153. "Environment" (環境, Kankyō); 154. "Master" (指導者(マスター), Masutā); 155. "Neo Egotist League" (新英雄大戦(ネオ・エゴイストリーグ), Neo Egoisuto Rīgu); 156. "Bastard"; 157. "Kaiser" (カイザー, Kaizā); 158. "All Time" (全ての瞬間(とき)を, Subete no Toki o)
19	May 17, 2022	978-4-06-527913-7	May 16, 2023 (digital); June 24, 2025 (print)	978-1-64-651798-5
159. "Martial Law" (覇道, Hadō); 160. "Ginga x Monster" (ジンガ×モンスター, Jinga x Monsutā); 161. "Bee Shot" (蜂撃(ビーショット), Bī Shotto); 162. "Kaiser Impact" (カイザーインパクト, Kaizā Inpakuto); 163. "Embodiment" (体現者, Taigen-sha); 164. "Butterfly" (蝶(バタフライ), Batafurai); 165. "God-Given" (神に与えられし, Kami ni Ataerare Shi); 166. "Vessel" (器, Utsuwa); 167. "Cross Flow"
20	July 15, 2022	978-4-06-528501-5	July 18, 2023 (digital); July 22, 2025 (print)	979-8-88-933041-7
168. "Full Scope" (全貌, Zenbō); 169. "Super Entertainment" (超常娯楽(スーパーエンターテイメント), Sūpā Entāteimento); 170. "Body Revolution" (肉体革命, Nikutai Kakumei); 171. "After the Game"; 172. "Double Suicide" (心中, Shinjū); 173. "vs.England"; 174. "Opening Shot" (オープニング・シュート, Ōpuningu Shūto); 175. "Ideal and Reality" (理想と現実, Risō to Genjitsu); 176. "44"
21	October 17, 2022	978-4-06-529489-5	September 5, 2023 (digital); August 26, 2025 (print)	979-8-88-933138-4
177. "Orbital Resonance" (惑星ホットライン, Wakusei Hottorain); 178. "Face the Hack Forward" (前向いていきまっしょい, Mae Muite iki Masshoi); 179. "Under Development" (発展途上中, Hattentojō-chū); 180. "Chick" (ヒヨッコ, Hiyokko); 181. "Big Bang Piece" (限界突破欠片(ビッグバン・ピース), Bigguban Pīsu); 182. "Meta Vision" (超越視界(メタ・ビジョン), Meta Bijon); 183. "Scenery" (景色, Keshiki); 184. "Best Goal Piece" (最適得点欠片(ベストゴールピース), Besuto Gōru Pīsu); 185. "Rebirth" (新生, Shinsei)
22	December 16, 2022	978-4-06-529987-6	November 7, 2023 (digital); September 16, 2025 (print)	979-8-88-933262-6
186. "Karma" (業(カルマ), Karuma); 187. "Crossroads" (CROSS ROAD); 188. "Vortex" (渦, Uzu); 189. "Yes Boss"; 190. "Revolutionary" (回天, Kaiten); 191. "Here I Come" (COMING SOON); 192. "Upheaval" (動乱, Dōran); 193. "Fangs" (牙, Kiba); 194. "World's #2" (世界2位(ナンバーツー), Nanbā Tsū)
23	March 16, 2023	978-4-06-530927-8	January 2, 2024 (digital); October 28, 2025 (print)	979-8-88-933317-3
195. "Divine Trial" (神の試練, Kami no Shiren); 196. "Stories" (物語, Monogatari); 197. "Protagonist Feeling" (主人公感, Shujinkō-kan); 198. "Zero Points" (0点, Rei-ten); 199. "What Can You See?" (何が視える, Nani ga Mieru); 200. "I Don't Need a Next Time" (次なんかいらない, Tsugi Nanka Iranai); 201. "Without Being Found by Anyone" (誰にも見つけられずに, Darenimo Mitsuke Rarezu ni); 202. "Sword Heart" (HEART OF SWORD); 203. "Overheat (オーバーヒート, Ōbāhīto)
24	May 17, 2023	978-4-06-531566-8	March 5, 2024 (digital); November 18, 2025 (print)	979-8-88-933403-3
204. "War Buddies" (戦友, Sen'yū); 205. "Man of the Match" (MOM(マン・オブ・ザ・マッチ), Man obu za Matchi); 206. "Expectations" (期待, Kitai); 207. "Two Pair" (ツーペア, Tsū Pea); 208. "100%"; 209. "Vs. Ubers" (vs.ユーヴァース, Vs. Yūvāsu); 210. "Ace Eater" (主役喰い(エース・イーター), Ēsu Ītā); 211. "Zombie" (ゾンビ, Zonbi); 212. "Unknown"
25	July 14, 2023	978-4-06-532183-6	May 7, 2024 (digital); December 16, 2025 (print)	979-8-88-933488-0
213. "Egoist Four" (E・4(エゴイスティック・フォー), Egoisutikku Fō); 214. "Work" (仕事, Shigoto); 215. "Successor" (後継者, Kōkeisha); 216. "Stealth Kill" (隠密殺撃(ステルス・キル), Suterusu Kiru); 217. "Predator Eyes" (捕食者視界(プレデター・アイ), Puredetā Ai); 218. "Game Changer" (変革者(ゲームチェンジャー), Gēmu Chenjā); 219. "Dynamism" (超連鎖活動(ダイナミズム), Dainamizumu); 220. "Seesaw Game" (シーソーゲーム, Shīsō Gēmu); 221. "Take Me With You" (連れてって, Tsuretette)
26	September 14, 2023	978-4-06-532844-6	July 2, 2024 (digital); January 20, 2026 (print)	979-8-88-933615-0
222. "Design" (設計(デザイン), Dezain); 223. "Are You Willing to Die?" (死ねるか, Shineru ka); 224. "An Easy Job" (簡単なお仕事, Kantan na Oshigoto); 225. "Raid Battle" (レイドバトル, Reido Batoru); 226. "Letter of Resignation" (退職願, Taishokunegai); 227. "Scales to the Future" (未来への天秤, Mirai e no Tenbin); 228. "Unruly Brat" (悪童, Akudō); 229. "Underdog" (UNDER DOG); 230. "Buddy" (同志(バディ), Badi)
27	December 15, 2023	978-4-06-533904-6	September 3, 2024 (digital); February 17, 2026 (print)	979-8-89-478004-7
231. "Dive to the Blue" (DIVE TO BLUE); 232. "High Evolution" (爆発多様進化(ハイ・エボリユーション), Hai Eboriyūshon); 233. "Keys" (鍵, Kagi); 234. "Producer" (演出家, Enshutsuka); 235. "The Reason You Were Born" (生まれてきた意味, Umarete Kita Imi); 236. "Goodbye" (サヨナラ, Sayonara); 237. "The Center of the World" (世界の中心, Sekai no Chūshin); 238. "Dreamers"; 239. "Creation" (創生, Sōsei)
28	March 15, 2024	978-4-06-534561-0	November 5, 2024 (digital); March 24, 2026 (print)	979-8-89-478154-9
240. "Triple Jump Up" (トリプルジャップアップ, Toripuru Jappu Appu); 241. "Pickled Radish and Natto" (たくあんと納豆, Takuan to Nattō); 242. "The Magician and the Blue Rose (Part 1)" (魔法使いと青い着薇(前編), Mahōtsukai to Aoi Bara (Zenpen)); 243. "The Magician and the Blue Rose (Part 2)" (魔法使いと青い着薇(後編), Mahōtsukai to Aoi Bara (Kōhen)); 244. "PXG" (P(パリ)・X(エクス)・G(ジェン), Pari Ekusu Jen); 245. "Die At Once" (いっべん死んでこい, Ibben Shinde Koi); 246. "Irregularity & Abnormality" (変則・変態, Hensoku Hentai); 247. "Originality" (自己独創性(オリジナリティ), Orijinariti); 248. "Final Fight" (ファイナル・ファイト, Fainaru Faito)
29	May 16, 2024	978-4-06-535506-0	January 14, 2025 (digital); April 21, 2026 (print)	979-8-89-478307-9
249. "The Beginning"; 250. "The Unknown" (未知との攻防, Michi to no Kōbō); 251. "VIP Seat" (特等席, Tokutō Seki); 252. "Best Performance" (最高表現(ベストパフォーマンス), Besuto Pafōmansu); 253. "Hellhole" (魔境, Makyō); 254. "Self-Style, World-Style" (自分型・世界型, Jibungata Sekaigata); 255. "Still Burning" (まだ燃えてる, Mada Moeteru); 256. "Read Between the Lines Between the Lines" (裏の裏の裏, Ura no Ura no Ura); 257. "Two-Gun"
30	August 16, 2024	978-4-06-536520-5	March 4, 2025 (digital); May 19, 2026 (print)	979-8-89-478421-2
258. "Combine, Invent, New Weapon" (合体・発明・新兵器, Gattai Hatsumei Shin Heiki); 259. "Impossible Challenge" (不可能挑戦, Fukanō Chōsen); 260. "Piece of Trash" (クソ物(ブツ), Kuso Butsu); 261. "Malice" (悪意, Akui); 262. "Zero"; 263. "Borderline" (境界線(ボーダーライン), Bōdārain); 264. "Dead Dead Dead or Alive" (死死死生(デッドデッドデッドオアアライブ), Deddo Deddo Deddo oa Araibu); 265. "Beyond Restriction" (不自由の彼方, Fujiyū no Kanata); 266. "Super Star"
31	October 17, 2024	978-4-06-537047-6	May 6, 2025 (digital); June 23, 2026 (print)	979-8-89-478518-9
267. "Golden Ticket" (黄金切符(ゴールデン・チケット), Gōruden Chiketto); 268. "Pressure" (重圧, Jūatsu); 269. "Not Only" (だけじゃない, Dake Janai); 270. "Break"; 271. "Life is Beautiful" (ライフ・イズ・ビューティフル, Raifu Izu Byūtifuru); 272. "Rock, Paper, Scissors" (ジャンケン, Janken); 273. "Monster of Destruction" (破壊獣, Hakai Jū); 274. "Failure of a Rival" (宿敵(ライバル)失格, Raibaru Shikkaku); 275. "Crashoot!"; 276. "The Last"
32	December 17, 2024	978-4-06-537763-5	July 1, 2025 (digital); July 21, 2026 (print)	979-8-89-478582-0
277. "Genius and Prodigy" (天才と秀才, Tensai to Shūsai); 278. "〇△□"; 279. "Soccer Junkies" (フットボールジャンキーズ, Futtobōru Jankīzu); 280. "The Wall of the Talented" (秀才の壁, Shūsai no Kabe); 281. "The Formula of Evolution" (進化の方程式, Shinka no Hōteishiki); 282. "Need You"; 283. "Desperate Defense" (壊攻死守, Kaikō Shishu); 284. "Soul" (魂, Tamashī); 285. "Contract" (契約, Keiyaku)
33	March 17, 2025	978-4-06-538708-5	September 9, 2025 (digital); August 18, 2026 (print)	979-8-89-478683-4
286. "New Era" (新時代, Shin Jidai); 287. "Because You Were Here" (お前がいたから, Omaega Itakara); 288. "Death Game" (デスゲーム, Desugēmu); 289. "Pig" (ブタ, Buta); 290. "Blue Bad Boy"; 291. "Fastest"; 292. "Bad Luck" (悪運, Akūn); 293. "Birth of a New Egoist" (新英雄誕生, Shin Eiyū Tanjō); 294. "Champion"
34	June 17, 2025	978-4-06-539759-6	November 11, 2025 (digital); September 22, 2026 (print)	979-8-89-478762-6
295. "No. 1"; 296. "Ecstatic Experience" (脳汁体験, Nōjū Taiken); 297. "To the Future"; 298. "Alone, Together" (ヒトリ・フタリ, Hitori Futari); 299. "Blue Tears"; 300. "Innocent" (イノセント, Inosento); 301. "Parade" (パレード, Parēdo); 302. "That's Enough" (もういい, Mō ī); 303. "Blue Lock Japan"
35	August 12, 2025	978-4-06-540365-5	January 6, 2026 (digital); October 20, 2026 (print)	979-8-89-478835-7
304. "Benefactor of my Dream" (夢の恩人, Yume no Onjin); 305. "×23"; 306. "Hello"; 307. "Bunny" (バニー, Banī); 308. "Pride Chicken" (プライドチキン, Puraido Chikin); 309. "Reunion" (再逢(さいかい), Saikai); 310. "Give It Up" (やめちまえ, Yame Chimae); 311. "Side-B"; 312. "U-20 World Cup"
36	November 17, 2025	978-4-06-541554-2	March 17, 2026 (digital); November 17, 2026 (print)	979-8-89-830034-0
313. "Opening Warriors" (開幕戦士, Kaimaku Senshi); 314. "Core" (核, Kaku); 315. "What the Hell?!" (なんそれ, Nansore); 316. "I'm Here" (俺がいる, Ore ga Iru); 317. "I've Got This on Lock" (そこんとこヨロシク, Sokontoko Yoroshiku); 318. "Yearning for Victory" (勝ちたい, Kachitai); 319. "The Fanaticism Formula" (熱狂の方程式, Nekkyō no Hōteishiki); 320. "Hero or Death" (Hero or Die); 321. "Insatiable" (あくなき, Aku Naki)
37	January 16, 2026	978-4-06-542204-5	May 12, 2026 (digital) December 15, 2026 (print)	979-8-89-830101-9
322. "Myself"; 323. "Shining Hope" (白日の希望, Hakujitsu no Kibō); 324. "Afterglow" (残光, Zankō); 325. "The Student Becomes the Master" (青は藍より出でて藍より青し, Aowa Aiyori Idete Aiyori Aoshi); 326. "Cola" (コーラ, Kōra); 327. "Birdcage" (鳥かご, Torikago); 328. "God"; 329. "Don't Run Away" (逃げんなよ, Nigen Nayo); 330. "Favorite to Win" (優勝候補, Yūshō Kōho)
38	April 16, 2026	978-4-06-543322-5	June 16, 2026 (digital) January 12, 2027 (print)	—
331. "Logic"; 332. "Suitable Destiny Theory" (適性運命論, Tekisei Unmei-ron); 333. "Natural-Born" (ナチュラル・ボーン, Nachuraru Bōn); 334. "Time to Wake Up" (目覚めの時, Mezame no Toki); 335. "Transformation" (変身, Henshin); 336. "Crow & Ice"; 337. "For the Blue"; 338. "Double Jokers" (ダブルジョーカー, Daburu Jōkā)
39	June 17, 2026	978-4-06-543884-8	—	—
339. "Worst Possible Situation" (絶望的逆境, Zetsubō Teki Gyakkyō); 340. "No Guard" (ノーガード, Nō Gādo); 341. "Choice for the Future" (未(み)来(らい)への選(せん)択(たく), Mirai e no Sentaku); 342. "Recapture" (奪冠(だつかん), Datsukan); 343. "Vivien Hugo" (ヴィヴィアン・ユーゴ―, Vivian Yūgo); 344. "Rebel" (反逆者, Hangyakusha); 345. "True Ending" (トゥルーエンド, Turū Endo); 346. "Full Bet"
40	August 17, 2026	978-4-06-544643-0	—	—
347. "Destiny"; 348. "This Is It" (コレだよコレ, Kore dayo Kore); 349. "Re-Live"; 350. "Ego Is"; 351. "Ego Idiosyncrasy" (エゴ特性, Ego Tokusei); 352. "Worthless Puppet" (ザコ人形(ドール), Dōru); 353. "Super Dark Horse" (超常異端児蹴団(スーパーダークホース), Sūpā Dāku Hōsu); 354. "Incomplete Dream" (夢の途中, Yume no Tochū)
41	November 17, 2026	978-4-06-545715-3	—	—
355. "One to Infinity" (ワン・トゥ・インフィニティ, Wan tu Infiniti); 356. "Rainbow Knight" (七色騎士, Nanairo Kishi); 357. "Double-Wing" (ダブルウィング, Daburū Ingu); 358. "Breakthrough Shot" (天元突破弾, Tengan Toppa-dan); 359. "Got It?" (だぁよぉ, Daayoo); 360. "Origin"; 361. "Self-Abnegation" (自己無能感, Jiko Munōkan); 362. "Obsession" (偏愛, Hen'ai)

=== Chapters not yet in tankōbon format ===
- 363. "Taboo Game"
- 364. "One-Point Gamble" (一点賭け（前編）, Itten Kake)
- 365. "Otherworldly" (異界種, Ikaishu)
- 366. "What Doesn't Yet Exist" (まだこの世界に存在しない, Mada Kono Sekai ni sonzai Shinai)
- 367. "Manufacture and Creation" (加工と創造, Kakō to Sōzō)
- 368. "Path to Failure" (負け筋, Makesuji)
- 369. "Concord" (呼応, Kō)

== Blue Lock: Episode Nagi volumes ==
No.	Original release date	Original ISBN	English release date	English ISBN
1	October 17, 2022	978-4-06-528981-5	October 15, 2024	979-8-88-877175-4
1. "A True Prodigy" (天才とは, Tensai to wa); 2. "Promise" (約束, Yakusoku); 3. "Dummy" (バカ, Baka); 4. "The Game"
2	March 16, 2023	978-4-06-530930-8	January 14, 2025	979-8-88-877176-1
5. "vs.Team Y"; 6. "The Emperor, the Fool, and the Slacker" (帝王とバカと面倒臭がり屋と, Teiō to baka to mendōkusa gari-ya to); 7. "V" (ブイ, Bui); 8. "I'm Not His Servant" (奴隷じゃないし, Dorei janaishi); 9. "Observer" (観測者, Kansoku-sha)
3	September 14, 2023	978-4-06-532843-9	April 8, 2025	979-8-88-877240-9
10. "Sprout" (めばえ, Mebae); 11. "Light" (光 前編, Kō zenpen); 12. "Change" (変, Hen); 13. "I Never Thought..." (こんなにも, Konna ni mo); 14. "Single-Minded" (一途, Ichizu)
4	April 17, 2024	978-4-06-535171-0	July 15, 2025	979-8-88-877371-0
15. "True Nature" (本性, Honshō); 16. "Utter Trash" (ゴミカス, Gomikasu); 17. "Fake"; 18. "Bye Bye, Egotist" (バイバイエゴイスト, Baibai Egoisuto); 19. "Death's Counterattack" (逆襲の死神, Gyakushū no Shinigami)
5	July 17, 2024	978-4-06-536163-4	October 14, 2025	979-8-88-877474-8
20. "Ignorance" (無知, Muchi); 21. "Overcoming Weakness" (弱点克服, Jakuten Kokufuku); 22. "Kay" (あい, Ai); 23. "Final"; 24. "Self-Awareness" (自覚, Jikaku)
6	November 15, 2024	978-4-06-537432-0	January 6, 2026	979-8-88-877564-6
25. "Stakes" (利害関係, Rigai Kankei); 26. "Speed & Dance"; 27. "Fake & Real"; 28. "Bye Bye" (バイバイ, Baibai)
7	May 16, 2025	978-4-06-539351-2	April 7, 2026	979-8-88-877743-5
29. "Realize"; 30. "Final Attack"; 31. "Phantom" (幻, Maboroshi); 32. "To You, Who Will Die Someday" (いつか死ぬ君へ, Itsuka Shinu-kun e)
8	August 12, 2025	978-4-06-540366-2	October 27, 2026	979-8-88-877868-5
33. "Flapping" (羽ばたき, Habataki); 34. "Never Wake Up from This Dream" (夢から醒めない, Yume kara Samenai); 35. "Eternal Sunset"; 36. "I Still..." (まだ, Mada)
