= As the Gods Will (film) =

2014 film directed by Takashi Miike

- Theatrical release poster
- Directed by: Takashi Miike
- Screenplay by: Hiroyuki Yatsu
- Based on: As the Gods Will by Muneyuki Kaneshiro and Akeji Fujimura
- Produced by: Hisashi Usui; Yusuke Ishiguro; Misako Saka; Shigeji Maeda
- Starring: Sota Fukushi; Hirona Yamazaki; Shota Sometani; Mio Yuki; Nao Omori; Lily Franky; Ryunosuke Kamiki
- Cinematography: Nobuyasu Kita
- Edited by: Kenji Yamashita
- Music by: Koji Endo
- Production companies: Toho Pictures; OLM
- Distributed by: Toho
- Release dates: October 18, 2014 (Rome Film Festival); November 15, 2014 (Japan)
- Running time: 117 minutes
- Country: Japan
- Language: Japanese
- Box office: $1.9 million

As the Gods Will (Japanese: 神さまの言うとおり, Hepburn: Kami-sama no Iu Tōri) is a 2014 Japanese supernatural horror film directed by Takashi Miike. It is based on the first arc of the manga series As the Gods Will by Muneyuki Kaneshiro and Akeji Fujimura.

As the Gods Will premiered at the Rome Film Festival on October 18, 2014, and was released in Japan on November 15. It received mixed reviews from Western critics, with criticism for its plot but praise for its special effects. Upon release of South Korean thriller series Squid Game, it was compared to As the Gods Will, which drew some controversy.

== Plot ==
High school student Shun Takahata lives an ordinary life that he finds boring. At school he is suddenly forced to participate in a deadly game of daruma san ga koronda. When the Daruma doll turns toward the blackboard, it exposes a button on its back that the students can attempt to press to end the game. But, if the doll spins back around and sees anyone moving, then those students' heads will explode. Everyone in the class except Shun dies in this first game.

After the game, Shun finds his childhood friend Ichika and they make their way to the school gym. There they play Maneki Neko, where students attempt to throw a basketball-sized bell into a hoop attached to the collar of a giant cat doll. Those who miss are killed. Shun and Ichika devise a plan to trick the cat, which they pull off with the help of Takeru Amaya. However, after winning the challenge, Amaya kills the remaining students that did not help them win, stating that the unworthy do not deserve to live. Amaya and Shun fight but are knocked out by sleeping gas released by the giant cat doll.

It is revealed that high schools all over the world are experiencing similar tests. Shun wakes up in a giant cube hovering over Tokyo with several other students, but Ichika is not there. Shun meets another student, Takase, who forms an immediate attachment to him.

The next game is Kagome Kagome, in which the students are blindfolded and forced to guess which of four floating Kokeshi wooden dolls is behind them. Several classmates fail and are killed before Shun tricks the Kokeshi into prematurely revealing who is behind him, winning the game. One of the Kokeshi turns into a key which opens the door to the next level. Shun is reunited with Amaya and Ichika.

The next game is Shirou Kuma, where a giant polar bear asks questions that each student must answer truthfully. If someone lies, the group must choose who they believe to be the liar, who is then killed by the white bear. In answer to one of the bear's questions, Ichika, Takase, and Amaya all reveal that they like Shun. The bear claims that someone amongst the group of students is trying to get every other player killed. Takase and another student are killed before Shun realizes that the bear is the liar and there is no traitor.

The final game is matryoshoka. The remaining five students draw lots to see who is the "demon." The students who are not the demon must hide, as whoever's face is seen by the demon will be "captured." The demon must also retrieve a can and set it within a circle. If the can is kicked over before the demon can capture at least three players, the can will explode and save everyone except the one who kicked it, who will die.

Amaya is chosen as the demon. All players except Shun are captured. Shun puts on a suit of armor and a helmet to stop Amaya from seeing his face, but Amaya pulls the helmet off and captures him. However, Shun uses this proximity to chain Amaya long enough to allow him to kick the can. The can fails to explode; the matroyshka dolls claim that all players get to survive and give the remaining players ice cream, saying that the players may leave after finishing it.

However, it is revealed that the ice cream is actually a random draw, with all but Amaya and Shun receiving ice cream with "you die" written on the stick inside. Ichika and the other two students are killed.

Amaya and Shun appear standing atop the giant cube while the citizens of Tokyo chant "God's children." Shun claims there is no god. The Matroyshka doll lists each of the hosts of the games as gods, then says "and God" as a man is revealed. Shun turns around to look at him.

== Cast ==
- Sota Fukushi as Shun Takahata
- Hirona Yamazaki as Ichika Akimoto
- Ryūnosuke Kamiki as Takeru Amaya
- Mio Yūki as Shoko Takase
- Shōta Sometani as Satake
- Jingi Irie as Eiji Oku
- Ryosuke Yamamoto as Mikinori Taira
- Minori Hagiwara as Yumi Taoka
- Sasuke Otsuru as Yukio Sanada
- Naoto Takahashi as Kotaro Maeda
- Nijiro Murakami as Haruhiko Yoshikawa
- Lily Franky as Homeless man/God
- Nao Omori as Takumi
- Dori Sakurada as Class president (cameo)
- Atsuko Maeda as Maneki-neko (voice)
- Tsutomu Yamazaki as Polar Bear (voice)

== Release ==
The film earned $1.5 million domestically in Japan in its first weekend in November. It was later released on home media in the United States by Funimation.

== Controversy ==
In 2021, the South Korean Netflix series Squid Game was accused of plagiarizing the movie, as both involve children's games where the penalty for losing is death, with the first games in both being Red Light, Green Light. However, writer-director Hwang Dong-hyuk claimed he wrote Squid Game's script in 2009, five years before As the Gods Will was released, stating "the similarities that were pointed out are purely coincidental and there is no copying from either party."
