= Dragon Collection =

Japanese media franchise

ドラゴンコレクション (Doragon Korekushon)
- Video game
- Developer: Konami
- Genre: Social network game
- Platform: Android, iOS, i-mode, EZweb
- Released: 2010
- Manga

Dragon Collection: Ryū o Suberu Mono
- Written by: Muneyuki Kaneshiro
- Illustrated by: Kyōta Shibano
- Published by: Kodansha
- Magazine: Weekly Shōnen Magazine
- Original run: August 13, 2011 – September 19, 2012
- Volumes: 6
- Video game

DraColle & Poker
- Developer: Konami
- Genre: Social network game
- Platform: Android, iOS
- Released: 2013
- Video game

Dragon Collection RPG: Shōnen to Ryū-gari no Ryū
- Developer: Konami
- Genre: Social network game
- Platform: Android, iOS
- Released: 2014
- Anime television series
- Directed by: Keiichiro Kawaguchi
- Studio: OLM
- Original network: TXN (TV Tokyo)
- Original run: April 7, 2014 – March 30, 2015
- Episodes: 51
- icon

Dragon Collection (ドラゴンコレクション, Doragon Korekushon) is a Japanese social network game created by Konami that was released on the GREE social networking platform in 2010. A manga adaptation titled Dragon Collection: Ryū o Suberu Mono was serialized from 2011 to 2012 in Kodansha's shōnen manga magazine Weekly Shōnen Magazine. It was collected in six tankōbon volumes. A trading card arcade game was released in 2013. An anime television series adaptation aired on April 7, 2014, alongside Monster Retsuden Oreca Battle, another Konami video game adaptation. The series ended on March 23, 2015, but a bonus episode showing events after Hiro leaves Dragon Earth aired on March 30. This show, along with Oreca Battle, lacks an ending theme, a hallmark of anime that premiered on TV Asahi.

== Synopsis ==
A young boy named Hiro wishes to play the eponymous video game with his father. Arriving early to the arcade, he begins a game, finds himself whisked away to the Dragon Collection universe. Trapped within the game's plot, Hiro must become a Dragon Master to escape the game and return home. Hiro embarks on a quest to gather allies, conquer monsters, and prevent a terrible evil from being freed on Dragon Earth.

Opening theme

- "Dragon Collection ~Yūki no Tsubasa~" by Nagareda Project

== Episodes ==
This is a caption
No.	Title	Original release date
1	"What's Going On!? DraColle!"; Transliteration: "Nani kore!? Dorakore!" (Japanese: なにこれ!? ドラコレ!)	April 7, 2014
2	"A Weirdo Has Arrived!"; Transliteration: "Hen'na no ga Kita!" (Japanese: ヘンなのが来た!)	April 14, 2014
3	"Yet Another Weirdo Has Arrived!"; Transliteration: "Mata 1-ri Hen'na no ga Kita!" (Japanese: また1人ヘンなのが来た!)	April 21, 2014
4	"Octopus Extermination at Myseen Castle!"; Transliteration: "Maisen Jō no Tako Taiji!" (Japanese: マイセン城のタコ退治!)	April 28, 2014
5	"Combination? What's That!?"; Transliteration: "Gōsei? Nani sore!?" (Japanese: 合成? なにそれ!?)	May 5, 2014
6	"The Endlessly Pesky Green Pepper Gang!"; Transliteration: "Akumade Shitsukoi Shishitō-dan!" (Japanese: あくまでしつこいシシトウ団!)	May 12, 2014
7	"What's That? A Monster Dispenser!"; Transliteration: "Nanidasu? Monsuta Dasu!" (Japanese: ナニダス? モンスダス!)	May 19, 2014
8	"Run! Hiro and Rei!"; Transliteration: "Hashire! Hiro & Rei!" (Japanese: 走れ! ヒロ&レイ!)	May 26, 2014
9	"Looks Like a Traveler in Trouble"; Transliteration: "Sōnan-sha ga Iru-sō Nan desu!" (Japanese: 遭難者がいるそうなんです!)	June 2, 2014
10	"Smash the Green Pepper Gang!"; Transliteration: "Shishitō-dan o Buttsubuse!" (Japanese: シシトウ団をぶっつぶせ!)	June 9, 2014
11	"The Young Master and the Slick Trickster!?"; Transliteration: "Wakasama to Ikasama!?" (Japanese: 若様とイカサマ!?)	June 16, 2014
12	"The Captain Stinks!?"; Transliteration: "Senchō wa Kusakatte!?" (Japanese: 船長は臭かった!?)	June 23, 2014
13	"The Evil Bizarreda Triangle!"; Transliteration: "Ma no Bimyōda・Toraianguru!" (Japanese: 魔のビミョーダ・トライアングル!)	June 30, 2014
14	"Pirate King Doc Rowe!"; Transliteration: "Kaizoku-Ō Dokku・Rō!" (Japanese: 海賊王ドック・ロー!)	July 7, 2014
15	"Captain Yut's Ambition!"; Transliteration: "Kyapuren Yūto no Yabō!" (Japanese: キャプテンユートの野望!)	July 14, 2014
16	"Me Versus Me!?"; Transliteration: "Ore vs Ore!?" (Japanese: 俺vsオレ!?)	July 21, 2014
17	"Shiver Me Timbers! Pirates?!"; Transliteration: "Zokuzoku Kaizoku!?" (Japanese: ぞくぞく海賊!?)	July 28, 2014
18	"Fusion? I Don't Believe It!"; Transliteration: "Gattei Arienai'ndesu Kedo~o!" (Japanese: 合体ありえないんですけどぉ~!)	August 4, 2014
19	"Co Uta Mara Strikes Back Big-Time!"; Transliteration: "Ko・Uta・Māra no Dai Gyakushō!" (Japanese: コ・ウタ・マーラの大逆襲!)	August 11, 2014
20	"Farewell Launshe!"; Transliteration: "Sataba, Raunche-gō!" (Japanese: さらば, ランシェ号!)	August 18, 2014
21	"Uh-Oh, We`re in Ohto!"; Transliteration: "Ōtto, Ōto ni Tsuichatta!" (Japanese: おおっと, 王都に着いちゃった!)	August 25, 2014
22	"The Darkness Grimoire!"; Transliteration: "Yami no Gurimoa!" (Japanese: 闇のグリモア!)	September 1, 2014
23	"Dragonia Battle Tournament!"; Transliteration: "Doragonia Batoru Tōnamento" (Japanese: ドラゴニアバトルトーナメント!)	September 8, 2014
24	"Farewell, Rei!"; Transliteration: "Saraba, Rei!" (Japanese: さらば, レイ!)	September 15, 2014
25	"Papi? Papi Papi!"; Transliteration: "Papī? Papi Papi!" (Japanese: パピー? パピパピ!)	September 22, 2014
26	"No Way!? Shin Evolves!?"; Transliteration: "Uso!? Shin ga Shinka!?" (Japanese: ウソ!? シンが進化!?)	September 29, 2014
27	"Burn Up! Meatmania!"; Transliteration: "Kiero! Mītomania!" (Japanese: 燃えろ! ミートマニア!)	October 6, 2014
28	"No Way! Hiro Evolves, Too!?"; Transliteration: "Uso!? Hiro mo Shinka!?" (Japanese: ウソ!? ヒロも進化!?)	October 13, 2014
29	"Fierce Fight! The Flame-Filled Final Round!"; Transliteration: "Kekitō!Honō no Kesshō Batoru!" (Japanese: 激闘! 炎の決勝バトル!)	October 20, 2014
30	"This Is Bad! Rebirth of the Evil God!?"; Transliteration: "Yabakore! Jashin Fukkatsu!?" (Japanese: ヤバコレ!邪神復活!?)	October 27, 2014
31	"Three Altars? A Puzzling Message!"; Transliteration: "3-tsu no Saidan? Nazo no Messēji!" (Japanese: 3つの祭壇? 謎のメッセージ!)	November 3, 2014
32	"Peeved! Peeved! Papi!"; Transliteration: "Funsuka! Punsuka! Papi!" (Japanese: ぷんすか!プンスカ!パピ!)	November 10, 2014
33	"So Ripped! Side Chest!?"; Transliteration: "Kiretemasu! Saido Chesuto!?" (Japanese: キレてます!サイドチェスト!?)	November 17, 2014
34	"Shock! This Is the Key!?"; Transliteration: "Bukkuri! Kore ga Kagi!?" (Japanese: ビックリ! これが鍵!?)	November 24, 2014
35	"It's My Ma!"; Transliteration: "Oira no Kāchan!" (Japanese: おいらの母ちゃん!)	December 1, 2014
36	"Tee-Hee! I`m Forever Seventeen!"; Transliteration: "Ufu♥ Eien no 17-sai!" (Japanese: ウフ♥永遠の17歳!)	December 8, 2014
37	"Why Don`t I Get a Hunch!?"; Transliteration: "Naze Wagahai dake Pin to Konai no da!?" (Japanese: なぜ吾輩だけピンと来ないのだ!?)	December 15, 2014
38	"Big Battle at the Undersea Temple!"; Transliteration: "Kaitei Shinden de Dai Batoru!" (Japanese: 海底神殿で大バトル!)	December 22, 2014
39	"Forced Confession! It's Yuna's Secret!"; Transliteration: "Gekihaku! Yuno no Hi・mi・tsu!" (Japanese: 激白! ユナのヒ・ミ・ツ!)	January 5, 2015
40	"Where's That? The Tartarus Gate!"; Transliteration: "Dokosore? Tarutarosu no Mon!" (Japanese: ドコソレ? タルタロスの門!)	January 12, 2015
41	"Tell Us, Nastasya!"; Transliteration: "Oshiete! Nasutāsha!" (Japanese: 教えて! ナスターシャ!)	January 19, 2015
42	"The Dragon Wing is Burning!?"; Transliteration: "Ryū no Tsubasa wa Kieteiru ka!?" (Japanese: 竜の翼は燃えているか!?)	January 26, 2015
43	"Set Sail! Darkskull!"; Transliteration: "Hasshin! Dākusukaru-gō!" (Japanese: 発進! ダークスカル号!)	February 2, 2015
44	"Really!? Rei Evolves, Too!?"; Transliteration: "Maji!? Rei mo Shinka!?" (Japanese: マジ!? レイも進化!?)	February 9, 2015
45	"Danger! Nine Dragons!"; Transliteration: "Kyōi! 9-tai no Doragon!!" (Japanese: 脅威! 9体のドラゴン!!)	February 16, 2015
46	"The Evil God Descends!!"; Transliteration: "Jashin! Kōrin!!" (Japanese: 邪神! 降臨!!)	February 23, 2015
47	"Shudder! The Epic Battle!"; Transliteration: "Gakuburu! Sōzetsu Batoru!" (Japanese: ガクブル! 壮絶バトル!)	March 2, 2015
48	"Evil! The Wickedest Dragon!"; Transliteration: "Jāku! Saikyō Doragon!" (Japanese: 邪悪! 最凶ドラゴン!)	March 9, 2015
49	"Advent of the Chaos God Drake!"; Transliteration: "Kōrin! Kaosu Goddo・Doreiku!" (Japanese: 光臨! カオスゴッド・ドレイク!)	March 16, 2015
50	"Dragon Master!"; Transliteration: "Doragon Masutā!" (Japanese: ドラゴンマスター!)	March 23, 2015
51	"Time For Guts! Meatmania!"; Transliteration: "Gattsu Daze! Mītomania!" (Japanese: ガッツだぜ! ミートマニア!)	March 30, 2015
