= Tesla Note =

Japanese manga series

- Cover of the first manga volume, featuring Kuruma and Botan

テスラノート (Tesura Nōto)
- Genre: Action, spy
- Manga
- Written by: Masafumi Nishida; Tadayoshi Kubo
- Illustrated by: Kouta Sannomiya
- Published by: Kodansha
- English publisher: NA: Kodansha USA
- Imprint: Shōnen Magazine Comics
- Magazine: Weekly Shōnen Magazine; (January 6 – July 7, 2021); Magazine Pocket; (August 4, 2021 – April 13, 2022)
- Original run: January 6, 2021 – April 13, 2022
- Volumes: 7
- Anime television series
- Directed by: Michio Fukuda
- Written by: Masafumi Nishida
- Music by: Kaoru Wada
- Studio: Gambit (production) (Note: Although Gambit is credited for the main Animation Production (アニメーション制作) responsibilities, Gambit itself is not an animation company, but rather a casting company. The creative studio Risemore and CG studios Studio Bokan and Type Zero, although each credited as Production Assistance (制作協力), must then be responsible for the series' animation.); Risemore (animation); Studio Bokan (animation); Type Zero (animation)
- Licensed by: Crunchyroll
- Original network: Tokyo MX, BS11
- Original run: October 3, 2021 – December 26, 2021
- Episodes: 13
- icon

Tesla Note (Japanese: テスラノート, Hepburn: Tesura Nōto) is a Japanese manga series written by Masafumi Nishida and Tadayoshi Kubo and illustrated by Kouta Sannomiya. It was serialized in Kodansha's Weekly Shōnen Magazine from January to July 2021, and it was transferred to Magazine Pocket in August 2021. An anime television series adaptation produced by Gambit aired from October to December 2021.

== Plot ==
Botan Negoro, a highly trained operative descended from the Negoro ninja clan, is recruited for "Mission T", a secret operation intended to prevent global catastrophe. The mission involves "Tesla's Shards", crystals said to contain Nikola Tesla's complete inventions, which have the power to trigger dangerous and unexplained phenomena.

Following a mysterious incident in Norway, Botan is tasked with recovering the shards alongside Kuruma, a self-proclaimed top agent from Japan. Their search puts them at odds with intelligence agents and spies from other countries who are all competing to obtain the shards for their own purposes.

== Characters ==
=== Japan Safety and Promotion Company ===
Botan Negoro (根来 牡丹, Negoro Botan)
Voiced by: Konomi Kohara
Kuruma (クルマ) /Kuruma Tanaka (田中 車, Tanaka Kuruma)
Voiced by: Tatsuhisa Suzuki
Ryūnosuke Takamatsu (高松隆之介, Takamatsu Ryūnosuke)
Voiced by: Tomoaki Maeno
Kyōhei Himi (氷見 恭平, Himi Kyōhei)
Voiced by: Kazuya Nakai
Kensuke Toriumi (鳥海賢介, Toriumi Kensuke)
Voiced by: Hidenobu Kiuchi

=== Central Intelligence Agency ===
Mickey Miller (ミッキー・ミラー, Mikkī Mirā)
Voiced by: Junichi Suwabe
Oliver Thornton (オリバー・ソーントン, Oribā Sōnton)
Voiced by: Hiroshi Kamiya
Lily Steinem (リリー・スタイネム, Rirī Sutainemu)
Voiced by: Shizuka Itō

=== Allies ===
Jingo Negoro (根来 甚吾, Negoro Jingo)
Voiced by: Mugihito
Jingo is Botan's grandfather.

=== Small House ===
Pino (ピノ)
Voiced by: Akira Ishida
Elmo (エルモ, Erumo)
Voiced by: Takaya Kuroda

== Media ==
=== Manga ===
Tesla Note, written by Masafumi Nishida and Tadayoshi Kubo and illustrated by Kouta Sannomiya, was serialized in Kodansha's Weekly Shōnen Magazine from January 6 to July 7, 2021. The manga was transferred to Magazine Pocket on August 4, 2021, and finished on April 13, 2022. Kodansha collected its 58 individual chapters into seven tankōbon volumes, released between April 16, 2021, and June 17, 2022.

The manga is licensed in English by Kodansha USA in digital form.

==== Volumes ====
No.	Original release date	Original ISBN	English release date	English ISBN
1	April 16, 2021	978-4-06-522983-5	October 19, 2021	978-1-63-699451-2
2	June 17, 2021	978-4-06-523586-7	January 25, 2022	978-1-63-699479-6
3	September 16, 2021	978-4-06-524840-9	February 2, 2022	978-1-63-699628-8
4	October 15, 2021	978-4-06-525142-3	April 19, 2022	978-1-68-491134-9
5	January 17, 2022	978-4-06-526287-0	June 28, 2022	978-1-68-491238-4
6	April 15, 2022	978-4-06-527537-5	September 27, 2022	978-1-68-491460-9
7	June 17, 2022	978-4-06-528181-9	November 22, 2022	978-1-68-491558-3

=== Anime ===
In April 2021, it was announced that the series would receive an anime television series adaptation. The series is animated by Gambit and directed by Michio Fukuda, with Masafumi Nishida overseeing the series' scripts, Pokimari designing the characters, and Kaoru Wada composing the series' music. It aired from October 3 to December 26, 2021, on Tokyo MX and BS11. Tokyo Monsters performed the opening theme "Puppet's", while Yui Ninomiya performed the ending theme "Sanbunteki Life". Funimation licensed the series outside of Asia.

==== Episodes ====
No.	Title	Directed by	Written by	Storyboarded by	Original release date
1	"A Consideration on the "New-Fledged Spy""; Transliteration: ""Shinmai Supai" ni Tsuite no Kōsatsu" (Japanese: 「新米スパイ」についての考察)	Michio Fukuda	Masafumi Nishida	Michio Fukuda	October 3, 2021
In Norway, a Japanese girl named Botan Negoro aims to be a talented spy. She teams up with Kuruma in a mission to retrieve the Tesla Crystal.
2	"A Consideration on "Contention""; Transliteration: ""Sōdatsu" ni Tsuite no Kōsatsu" (Japanese: 「争奪」についての考察)	Michio Fukuda	Masafumi Nishida	Michio Fukuda	October 10, 2021
Botan and Kuruma team up to recover Tesla Fragment, the object responsible for the train disappearance incident, which was to contain records of the Tesla coil.
3	"A Consideration on "Mission IS""; Transliteration: ""Misshon IS" ni Tsuite no Kōsatsu" (Japanese: 「ミッションIS」についての考察)	Michio Fukuda	Masafumi Nishida	Michio Fukuda	October 17, 2021
The Tesla Shard No. 3 owned Botan and her companions one of the Tesla Shards are stolen. Jingo suspects that the culprit is a secret organization that has long coveted the power contained within these shards. Having returned to Japan from Norway, Botan moves into a shared house for intelligence agents where Kuruma and Ryunosuke live. Together, they track down the missing shard and uncover the Small House.
4	"A Consideration on "Divine Thunderbolts""; Transliteration: ""Kami no Ikazuchi" ni Tsuite no Kōsatsu" (Japanese: 「神の雷」についての考察)	Michio Fukuda	Masafumi Nishida; Kazuhito Yoneyama	Michio Fukuda	October 24, 2021
Botan and Kuruma head to Chicago and find the Corrad family is using Tesla Fragment, an object known as Prigiera is capable of manipulating lightning. However, Botan and the others find themselves in danger after becoming caught up in a conflict with a rival organization known as Bad Block.
5	"A Consideration on "Relationships of Trust""; Transliteration: ""Shinrai Kankei" ni Tsuite no Kōsatsu" (Japanese: 「信頼関係」についての考察)	Michio Fukuda	Masafumi Nishida; Kazuhito Yoneyama	Michio Fukuda	October 31, 2021
Teone, boss of the Conrad family, is targeted by Boze, his trusted second-in-command. As the search on the fifth Tesla Fragment in Boze's possession continues, Botan and the others itself joined in the fray by Oliver Thornton and Mickey Miller from the CIA (Central Intelligence Agency). However, Boze – who can manipulate lightning thanks to the power of the Tesla Fragment – fights back, leaving both teams struggling to find any opening to seize it.
6	"A Consideration on "Three-Way Battles""; Transliteration: ""Mitsudomoe" ni Tsuite no Kōsatsu" (Japanese: 「三つ巴」についての考察)	Michio Fukuda	Masafumi Nishida; Kazuhito Yoneyama	Michio Fukuda	November 7, 2021
When a car on the top floor of the Chicago Tower is shot, Mickey feels anxious and confused by the unexpected offer, but accepts it to save the car. At the same time, a mysterious force was moving to take away the slips of Tesla.
7	"A Consideration on "Hunger, and the Readiness to Face It""; Transliteration: ""Kūfukukan, Oyobi, Sore ni Mukiau Kakugo" ni Tsuite no Kōsatsu" (Japanese: 「空腹感、および、それに向き合う覚悟」についての考察)	Ryōji Takai	Masafumi Nishida; Kazuhito Yoneyama	Michio Fukuda	November 14, 2021
Botan and the others, alongside the CIA team, try to befriend Pino and Elmo, the members of Small House.
8	"A Consideration on "Truth""; Transliteration: ""Shinjitsu" ni Tsuite no Kōsatsu" (Japanese: 「真実」についての考察)	Ryōji Takai	Masafumi Nishida; Kazuhito Yoneyama	Michio Fukuda	November 21, 2021
In CIA's medical ship, Asclepios, a three-way battle between the Botan's team, the CIA, and Small House occurs. Botan's group follow Pino and Elmo, who have left the ship by boat, but they are killed.
9	"A Consideration on "Dog People""; Transliteration: ""Inuha" ni Tsuite no Kōsatsu" (Japanese: 「犬派」についての考察)	Ryōji Takai	Masafumi Nishida; Kazuhito Yoneyama	Jun'ichi Sakata; Michio Fukuda	November 28, 2021
Botan learns the truth about her parents from her grandfather, Jingo Nigoro. She feels her mother's feelings and declares his return to the intelligence officer. Meanwhile, in the CIA, Mickey is summoned from the upper echelons to be stunned when he is informed of the detention of Oliver. The group goes on a trip to Russia, where unidentified creature called Bigfoot suddenly attacked a mountain climber. Botan, who suspect the involvement of Tesla Fragment, contact Sergey, a mountain guide who says they encountered Bigfoot instead.
10	"A Consideration on "Suspects""; Transliteration: ""Yōgisha" ni Tsuite no Kōsatsu" (Japanese: 「容疑者」についての考察)	Ryōji Takai	Masafumi Nishida; Kazuhito Yoneyama	Michio Fukuda	December 5, 2021
11	"A Consideration on "Searches""; Transliteration: ""Tansaku" ni Tsuite no Kōsatsu" (Japanese: 「探索」についての考察)	Ryōji Takai	Masafumi Nishida; Kazuhito Yoneyama	Namako Umino; Michio Fukuda	December 12, 2021
12	"A Consideration on "Time Limits""; Transliteration: ""Taimu Rimitto" ni Tsuite no Kōsatsu" (Japanese: 「タイムリミット」についての考察)	Ryōji Takai	Masafumi Nishida; Kazuhito Yoneyama	Ten Ōguro; Michio Fukuda	December 19, 2021
13	"A Consideration on "By Your Will""; Transliteration: ""Gyoi" ni Tsuite no Kōsatsu" (Japanese: 「御意」についての考察)	Ryōji Takai	Masafumi Nishida; Kazuhito Yoneyama	Ten Ōguro; Michio Fukuda	December 26, 2021

== See also ==
- Blue Lock: Episode Nagi, another manga series illustrated by Kōta Sannomiya
