= Jagaaan =

Japanese manga series

- Cover of the first volume

ジャガーン (Jagān)
- Genre: Supernatural horror
- Manga
- Written by: Muneyuki Kaneshiro
- Illustrated by: Kensuke Nishida
- Published by: Shogakukan
- English publisher: NA: Abrams ComicArts
- Imprint: Big Comics
- Magazine: Weekly Big Comic Spirits
- Original run: February 6, 2017 – November 8, 2021
- Volumes: 14
- icon

Jagaaan (Japanese: ジャガーン, Hepburn: Jagān) is a Japanese manga series written by Muneyuki Kaneshiro and illustrated by Kensuke Nishida. It was serialized in Shogakukan's Weekly Big Comic Spirits from February 2017 to November 2021, with its chapters collected in fourteen tankōbon volumes.

== Publication ==
Written by Muneyuki Kaneshiro and illustrated by Kensuke Nishida, Jagaaan was serialized in Shogakukan's seinen manga magazine Weekly Big Comic Spirits from February 6, 2017, to November 8, 2021. Shogakukan collected its chapters in fourteen tankōbon volumes, released from May 30, 2017, to December 28, 2021.

In January 2026, Abrams ComicArts announced that it had licensed the series for English publication, with the first volume set to release in September of the same year.

=== Volumes ===
No.	Original release date	Original ISBN	English release date	English ISBN
1	May 30, 2017	978-4-09-189505-9	September 29, 2026	978-1-41-978638-9
2	July 28, 2017	978-4-09-189602-5	December 1, 2026	978-1-41-978639-6
3	October 30, 2017	978-4-09-189719-0	March 2, 2027	978-1-41-978640-2
4	February 23, 2018	978-4-09-189795-4	June 1, 2027	978-1-41-978641-9
5	June 29, 2018	978-4-09-189893-7	—	—
6	October 30, 2018	978-4-09-860120-2	—	—
7	February 28, 2019	978-4-09-860224-7	—	—
8	June 28, 2019	978-4-09-860317-6	—	—
9	November 29, 2019	978-4-09-860445-6	—	—
10	April 27, 2020	978-4-09-860597-2	—	—
11	September 30, 2020	978-4-09-860713-6	—	—
12	February 26, 2021	978-4-09-860857-7	—	—
13	July 30, 2021	978-4-09-861112-6	—	—
14	December 28, 2021	978-4-09-861171-3	—	—
