= As the Gods Will =

Japanese manga series

- First tankōbon volume cover showing a Daruma doll

神さまの言うとおり (Kami-sama no Iu Tōri)
- Genre: Psychological thriller; Survival
- Manga
- Written by: Muneyuki Kaneshiro
- Illustrated by: Akeji Fujimura
- Published by: Kodansha
- English publisher: NA: Kodansha USA (digital)
- Magazine: Bessatsu Shōnen Magazine
- Original run: February 9, 2011 – October 9, 2012
- Volumes: 5
- Manga

As the Gods Will: The Second Series
- Written by: Muneyuki Kaneshiro
- Illustrated by: Akeji Fujimura
- Published by: Kodansha
- English publisher: NA: Kodansha USA (digital)
- Magazine: Weekly Shōnen Magazine
- Original run: January 16, 2013 – December 28, 2016
- Volumes: 21
- Live-action film
- As the Gods Will (2014)

As the Gods Will (Japanese: 神さまの言うとおり, Hepburn: Kami-sama no Iu Tōri) is a Japanese manga series written by Muneyuki Kaneshiro and illustrated by Akeji Fujimura. It was serialized in Kodansha's shōnen manga magazine Bessatsu Shōnen Magazine from February 2011 to October 2012, with its chapters collected in five tankōbon volumes. A second series, As the Gods Will: The Second Series, was serialized in Weekly Shōnen Magazine from January 2013 to December 2016, with its chapters collected in 21 volumes. A four-chapter prequel series, titled As the Gods Will Zero, was published on Kodansha's Magazine Pocket app and website from January to February 2017. The first series was adapted into a live action film directed by Takashi Miike and premiered in November 2014.

== Plot ==
=== As the Gods Will ===
During a day at high school, Takahata Shun witnesses the explosion of his teacher's head, after which he and his classmates find themselves forced to play children's games, such as Daruma-san ga koronda, with deadly stakes. With no idea who is behind this mysterious deadly game session, and no way of knowing when it will finally end, the only thing Shun and other students can do is keep trying to win. Numerous games follow, each one with more and more casualties. Shun encounters Takeru Amaya, a muscular and disturbed young boy who takes great pleasure in the events. He is a psychopath, and despite being polar opposites, they manage to work with each other.

The final volume sees the creator of the games, Kamimaro, launching his final games with all the remaining victors. Shun and Amaya try to kill him with magical "bombs" used for one of the games, but they get wounded by their own weapons and as a result are thrown out, on the verge of death, for trying to cheat God.

=== As the Gods Will: The Second Series ===
During the same timeline as the first part, Yasuto Akashi skipped school the day the games began, after having a fight with his best friend, Senichi Aoyama. While his classmates competed in the games at school, Akashi and other students who skipped school must compete in a separate set of games in order to survive. After some deadly games and trials (where Aoyama dies after reconciling with Akashi), the two series align when Ushimitsu, one of Akashi's friends, save Shun and Amaya, protagonists of the first series, from their doom after they tried to cheat the "God" of their games.

The god of the second series, Sein Kami, is killed midway through the story, impaled by giant school tools when his sister Acid Mana finds his games to be too "boring". She then takes over the games. The god of the first series, Kaminokouji Kamimaro, is revealed to be a human fed up with life who was reluctantly given God powers by Mana. He created the games to find another god because he did not want to be God, and wanted to be erased in the new world. He dies together with Shun in Judgment Old Maid, the penultimate game, happy to have finally found a "friend" (Shun). In the end, Acid Mana is revealed to be a "human" living in the "outside world" and she has created the world where the events of the story take place. Her goal was to find the new god of this world through the games.

The last remaining survivors (Ushimitsu, Akashi and Amaya) become gods but realize they cannot bring back all the people who died during the games (only their memories of them, or empty shells/puppets). The final game between the three gods is a dice game where each number gives a number of hits, whereby each hit destroy a memory. Amaya standing as "the god of destruction" (living for himself) loses against Akashi "the god of hope" (living for the others) who dies shortly after, having lost each and every one of his memories, even that of himself. Ushimitsu, truly loving Akashi, decides to rewind the events at the beginning of the games with him as the god, waiting for Akashi to confront and release him of his loneliness.

=== As the Gods Will Zero ===
Mana is in fact Anam, an Earthling from the future, after the Earth has been swallowed up by the Sun. She, along with 99 others, won a lottery that let them board a spaceship to be the only people to escape the death of the Earth. They landed on a sentient planet, which killed all of the adults but granted the five children aboard godlike powers. Three of the children intentionally or unintentionally wish for death and have it granted as a wish. Mana develops her abilities for hundreds of millions of years, until she is able to create a perfectly replicated Earth, allowing her remaining friend to return to his family.

Later, she and Sein Kami, whom she created as a brother, enter the version of the Earth in the "most boring era" and grant Kamimaro his Tomfoolery, thus starting the entire story.

== Media ==
=== Manga ===
Written by Muneyuki Kaneshiro and illustrated by Akeji Fujimura, As the Gods Will was serialized in Kodansha's shōnen manga magazine Bessatsu Shōnen Magazine from February 9, 2011, to October 9, 2012. Its chapters were collected by Kodansha in five tankōbon volumes, released from July 8, 2011, to December 7, 2012. The manga has been licensed for English digital release in North America by Kodansha USA, and the first volume is set to be released on November 12, 2024.

A second series, As the Gods Will: The Second Series, was serialized in Weekly Shōnen Magazine from January 16, 2013, to December 28, 2016. Its chapters were collected by Kodansha in 21 volumes, released from April 17, 2013, to February 17, 2017. Crunchyroll started publishing the manga digitally in English on October 30, 2013. In North America, Kodansha USA published the volumes digitally from November 3, 2015. to October 10, 2017.

A four-chapter prequel story, titled As the Gods Will Zero (神さまの言うとおり零, Kami-sama no Iu Tōri Zero), was published on Kodansha's Magazine Pocket app and website from January 27 to February 17, 2017.

=== Live-action film ===
A live-action film based on the first series, directed by Takashi Miike, premiered on November 15, 2014.

== Reception ==
The manga had sold 1.5 million copies by 2013.
