= Blue Lock =

Japanese manga series

- First tankōbon volume cover, featuring Yoichi Isagi

ブルーロック (Burū Rokku)
- Genre: Sports; Thriller
- Manga
- Written by: Muneyuki Kaneshiro
- Illustrated by: Yusuke Nomura
- Published by: Kodansha
- English publisher: NA: Kodansha USA
- Imprint: Shōnen Magazine Comics
- Magazine: Weekly Shōnen Magazine
- Original run: August 1, 2018 – present
- Volumes: 41
- Manga

Blue Lock: Episode Nagi
- Written by: Muneyuki Kaneshiro
- Illustrated by: Kōta Sannomiya
- Published by: Kodansha
- English publisher: NA: Kodansha USA
- Magazine: Bessatsu Shōnen Magazine
- Original run: June 9, 2022 – July 9, 2025
- Volumes: 8
- Anime television series
- Directed by: Tetsuaki Watanabe (S1); Shunsuke Ishikawa (S1) (Note: Credited as Assistant Director (副監督, Fuku Kantoku)); Yūji Haibara (S2) (Note: Haibara was originally announced as the season's "chief director" with Shintarou Inokawa credited as director beneath him. For unknown reasons, Inokawa's credit was removed and his name does not appear on the series. Following Inokawa's removal and Haibara taking on the role of "director", Naoki Kusumoto and Kentarou Sugimoto were credited in the role of technial animation directors (アニメーション監督).)
- Written by: Taku Kishimoto
- Music by: Jun Murayama
- Studio: Eight Bit
- Licensed by: Crunchyroll (Note: In North America through Crunchyroll, LLC); SA/SEA: Medialink
- Original network: ANN (TV Asahi)
- English network: SEA: Animax Asia; US: Adult Swim (Toonami)
- Original run: October 9, 2022 – present
- Episodes: 38
- Anime film

Blue Lock: Episode Nagi
- Directed by: Shunsuke Ishikawa
- Written by: Taku Kishimoto
- Music by: Jun Murayama
- Studio: Eight Bit
- Licensed by: Crunchyroll
- Released: April 19, 2024
- Runtime: 91 minutes
- Live-action film
- Directed by: Yusuke Taki
- Produced by: Shinzo Matsuhashi
- Written by: Tetsuo Kamata
- Music by: Yoshiaki Dewa; Yasunori Nishiki; Kay; Nic Glitter; Mon/Ku
- Studio: Credeus; CK Works
- Released: August 7, 2026
- Runtime: 128 minutes
- icon

Blue Lock (Japanese: ブルーロック, Hepburn: Burū Rokku; stylized in Latin script as BLUELOCK) is a Japanese manga series written by Muneyuki Kaneshiro and illustrated by Yusuke Nomura. It has been serialized in Kodansha's Weekly Shōnen Magazine since August 2018, with its chapters collected in 41 tankōbon volumes as of November 2026. The series follows aspiring football star Yoichi Isagi as he attempts to qualify for the Japan national team, which has instituted a novel and intense program to develop the world's greatest striker.

An anime television series adaptation produced by Eight Bit aired from October 2022 to March 2023. An anime film adaptation based on the Episode Nagi spin-off manga premiered in April 2024. A second season, subtitled vs. U-20 Japan, aired from October to December 2024. A third season, subtitled Neo Egoist League, has been announced. A live-action film adaptation premiered in Japan in August 2026.

By August 2026, the manga had over 65 million copies in circulation worldwide, making it one of the best-selling manga series of all time. In 2021, Blue Lock won the 45th Kodansha Manga Award in the shōnen category.

== Plot ==
The Japan national team finished 16th in the 2018 FIFA World Cup. The Japan Football Association hires the football enigma Jinpachi Ego. His masterplan to lead Japan to stardom is Blue Lock, a training regimen designed to create the world's greatest egotistical striker. Those who fail Blue Lock will never again be permitted to represent Japan. Yoichi Isagi, an unknown high school football player who is conflicted about his playing style, decides to join the program competing against 299 other players to become the best striker in the world.

== Media ==
=== Manga ===
Written by Muneyuki Kaneshiro and illustrated by Yusuke Nomura, Blue Lock started in Kodansha's Weekly Shōnen Magazine on August 1, 2018. Kodansha has collected its chapters into individual tankōbon volumes. The first volume was released on November 16, 2018. As of November 17, 2026, 41 volumes have been released.

In January 2021, Kodansha USA announced that it had licensed the manga for English digital release in North America, starting on March 16, 2021. In January 2022, Kodansha USA announced that it would release the manga in print. In July 2025, Kodansha USA announced that it would publish the manga in an omnibus edition starting in Q2 2026.

A spin-off manga focusing on Seishiro Nagi, titled Blue Lock: Episode Nagi (ブルーロック-EPISODE 凪-), was serialized in Kodansha's Bessatsu Shōnen Magazine from June 9, 2022, to July 9, 2025. The spin-off is written by Muneyuki Kaneshiro and illustrated by Kōta Sannomiya. Its chapters were collected in eight tankōbon volumes, released from October 17, 2022, to August 12, 2025. Kodansha has published the series in English on its K Manga service. In October 2023, Kodansha USA announced that the manga is planned to be published in print. The first volume was released on October 15, 2024.

=== Anime ===
An anime television series adaptation was announced in August 2021. The series is produced by Eight Bit and directed by Tetsuaki Watanabe, with Shunsuke Ishikawa serving as assistant director, Taku Kishimoto overseeing the series' scripts, Masaru Shindō providing the main character designs and serving as chief animation director, Hisashi Tojima serving as a chief action director, and Jun Murayama composing the music. The series' first season ran for 24 episodes from October 9, 2022, to March 26, 2023, on TV Asahi's NUMAnimation programming block. (Note: TV Asahi lists the series premiere at 25:30 on October 8, 2022, which is effectively 1:30 a.m. JST on October 9.) The first opening theme song is "Chaos ga Kiwamaru" (カオスが極まる; lit. 'Chaos Reigns'), performed by Unison Square Garden, while the first ending theme song is "Winner", performed by Shugo Nakamura. The second opening theme song is "Judgement", performed by Ash Da Hero, while the second ending theme song is "Numbness Like a Ginger", performed by Unison Square Garden.

Following the conclusion of the first season, a second season was announced. Titled vs. U-20 Japan, the season aired from October 5 to December 28, 2024, on TV Asahi's brand new IMAnimation block. The opening theme song is "Bōjaku no Charisma" (傍若のカリスマ, Bōjaku no Karisuma), performed by Unison Square Garden, while the ending theme song is "One", performed by Snow Man.

In September 2025, a third season covering the "Neo Egoist League" story arc was announced at the "Blue Lock Egoist Fest 2025" event. The third season is titled Neo Egoist League.

==== English release ====
Crunchyroll has licensed the series for streaming and premiered an English dub on October 22, 2022. The company released the series on two Blu-ray Disc sets on November 14, 2023, and May 28, 2024. In January 2026, it was announced that the English dub would make its broadcast television premiere in the United States on Adult Swim's Toonami programming block beginning on February 8, 2026.

Medialink licensed the series in the Asia-Pacific region. It was broadcast on Animax Asia in the region.

==== Film ====
At the end of the first season, an anime film adaptation of the Episode Nagi manga was also announced. The film features the staff and cast reprising their roles, with Shunsuke Ishikawa, who served as assistant director for the first season, assigned to direct the film and manga writer Muneyuki Kaneshiro supervising the story. The film was distributed by Bandai Namco Filmworks and premiered in Japanese theaters on April 19, 2024. Nissy and Sky-Hi performed the film's theme song, "Stormy".

In April 2024, Crunchyroll announced that they had acquired North American and select international theatrical rights to the film. The film was released in the United States and Canada on June 28. In the Philippines, the film was released by Pioneer Films on July 31.

=== Live-action film ===
In September 2025, it was announced that the manga would receive a live-action film adaptation. It premiered in Japan on August 7, 2026. Credeus produced the film with CK Works and was distributed by Toho. The film's theme song is "Monstruo" (モンストロ, Monsutoro), performed by Ado.

=== Stage plays ===
A stage play adaptation of the manga was announced by Kodansha in December 2022. It ran on May 4–7, 2023, at Osaka's Sankei Hall Breeze and on May 11–14 at Tokyo's Sunshine Theater. The play was directed and written by Naohiro Ise. The cast included Ryōhei Takenaka as Yoichi Isagi, Nobunaga Satō as Meguru Bachira, Shōta Matsuda as Rensuke Kunigami, and Ryō Saeki as Hyōma Chigiri. A second play, subtitled 2nd Stage, ran on January 18–24, 2024, at Kyoto Theater and on January 25–31 at Hulic Hall Tokyo. The play was again directed and written by Ise, and Kōhei Nagata joined the cast as Rin Itoshi, with the other cast members returning to reprise their roles from the previous stage play.

A third play, subtitled 3rd Stage, ran on August 9–12, 2024, at the Higashi-Osaka Cultural Creation Hall Dream House Great Hall and on August 17–25 at Tokyo's Theater H. The new cast members including Ryono Kusachi, Gaku Matsuda, Kosuke Asuma, and Kairi Miura. A fourth play, subtitled 4th Stage, ran on May 15–25, 2025, at Tokyo's Theatre Milano-Za and on May 30–June 1 at the Higashi-Osaka Cultural Creation Hall Dream House Great Hall.

A stage play based on Episode Nagi spin-off manga ran on November 20–30, 2025, at Theatre G-Rosso. The cast included Takamichi Satō as Seishirō Nagi and Shūji Kikuchi as Reo Mikage. A second play, subtitled Re: Episode Nagi, ran on June 11–21, 2026, at Tokyo's Theater 1010 and on June 25–28 at Kyoto Theater.

A fifth play of the main series, covering the "Neo Egoist League" story arc, is scheduled to run in Q4 2026.

=== Video games ===
A smartphone game based on the series, titled Blue Lock: Blaze Battle, was released on March 1, 2024, for both iOS and Android devices. A promotional video for the game, featuring Hey! Say! JUMP's Ryosuke Yamada, was released. The game is set to end service on March 31, 2026. Another smartphone game, titled Blue Lock Project: World Champion, was released in English for both iOS and Android devices on April 23, 2024.

In March 2024, Konami announced a collaboration with the series for their eFootball 2024 game.

=== Novel ===
A prologue novel, titled Blue Lock: Tatakai no Mae, Bokura wa. Aryū, Barō, Yukimiya (ブルーロック 戦いの前、僕らは。 蟻生・馬狼・雪宮; lit. 'Blue Lock: Before the Fight, We are Aryu, Barō, Yukimiya'), penned by Momo Moegi and Yusuke Nomura, was published on July 17, 2024.

=== Other media ===
In a 2021 collaboration with FC Tokyo, artist Yusuke Nomura illustrated Blue Lock characters wearing FC Tokyo jerseys, while players such as Diego Oliveira, Adaílton, and Weverson Leandro Oliveira Moura appeared in promotional artwork. In November 2024, Liverpool FC and Kodansha held a Blue Lock exhibition at Comic Con Liverpool. The collaboration featured Liverpool players reimagined in the style of the series. The event included appearances by former player David James and mascot Mighty Red, with activities for LFC Foundation participants.

In June 2025, Blue Lock teamed up with Concacaf to produce exclusive content and limited-edition merchandise—marking the first-ever collaboration between a sports manga and a major football confederation.

== Reception ==
=== Manga ===
By August 2020, the manga had over 1.9 million copies in circulation, with growth in subsequent years. By August 2026, it had over 65 million copies in circulation.

Blue Lock was the best-selling manga series in the first half of 2023 (the period between November 2022 and May 2023), with over 8 million copies sold, while volumes 12–14 and 21–23 were among the best-selling manga volumes from the same period. Volumes 22–24 were among the best-selling manga volumes of 2023. Volume 24 was Kodansha's second-highest first print run manga volume of 2023–2024 (period from April 2023–March 2024), with 450,000 copies printed, while the third volume of Blue Lock: Episode Nagi was the fifth, with 210,000 copies printed.

The series was recommended by manga author Hajime Isayama of Attack on Titan fame, for whom Yusuke Nomura previously worked as an assistant. Blue Lock was one of the Top 3 Sports Manga Series of the "Nationwide Bookstore Employees' Recommended Comics of 2020" by Honya Club. Blue Lock won the 45th Kodansha Manga Award in the shōnen category in 2021. In 2022, the series was nominated for a Harvey Award in the Best Manga category, and the Youth Selection category at the 49th Angoulême International Comics Festival.

Rebecca Silverman of Anime News Network, in her review of the series' first two volumes, called the "dystopian sports" concept something that makes it stand out among other sports series; however, she said that it is so "blatantly absurd that it doesn't entirely work". Silverman praised its art, noting Tite Kubo's overtones, and concluded that while the first two volumes are not perfect, there is enough going to make her want to read more.

=== Anime ===
Bamboo Dong of Anime News Network described the first half of the first season, saying that while the superhuman abilities provide a good chuckle, the characters also go a long way in broadening the series' appeal for anime fans who didn't know or care about soccer. Dong praised the action scenes, noting that these plays are a "genuine thrill to watch", although she felt there are times when the consistency and quality dip. Nonetheless, she concluded that "Blue Lock is a really good time, especially if they have a high tolerance for camp and absurdity. ... Action fans will enjoy the strategy sessions and head-to-head showdowns, while soccer fans will enjoy the impassioned and mildly angry love story to the sport, like armchair quarterbacking brought to life."

Writing for The O'Colly, Baylor Bryant praised its dynamics in games, calling them both "strong" and "compelling." Baylor wrote that Blue Lock has flaws and is still a sports anime, while its climactic moments are still just soccer matches. However, the games are interesting, filled with their own storylines, and each match showcases new and unique strikers with their own style and narrative they bring to the story. The writer described the animation, noting that "it has moments, but with players moving around the field playing a game of soccer, it's not always clean and crisp." Nevertheless, despite its limitations, the anime was more enjoyable for viewers who wanted more comedy and avoided reading the manga.

Rafael Motamayor of IGN compared the show to 2021's Squid Game while describing it as "a fairly typical sports anime." Rafael said that the anime does have some interesting things to say about sports, their competitiveness, and what it means to be a great athlete. The animation was criticized, saying that the use of 3D computer animation, and particularly the back-and-forth between CG and traditional 2D animation, became "jarring" to watch compared to Haikyu!!, which is full of fluid movements. However, he concluded that it compensates for uneven CG with striking keyframes and fantastic use of visual metaphors.

In 2023, Blue Lock won the New Face Award at the Japan Character Awards by Japan's Character Brand Licensing Association (CBLA). The series ranked second behind Oshi no Ko in the anime category of the Yahoo! Japan Search Awards, based on the number of searches for a particular term compared to the year before. In 2025, three international voice actors were nominated in the Best Voice Artist Performance category at the 9th Crunchyroll Anime Awards: Julien Chaaya (Yoichi Isagi) and Mohammed Sami (Rin Itoshi) in Arabic, and Ranjit R Tiwari (Isagi) in Hindi.

The second season received criticism for its drop in animation quality, mainly in the second episode. Writing for Anime News Network, MrAJCosplay criticized the episode for its direction and the use of still frames, and calling it a bit "disorientating" between the characters' movements. Rayan Sayyed of IGN pointed out that an animator who is involved for its second episode, noting the working conditions about fluid animation and movements that results to production issues faced by the studio, while comparing it to MAPPA's controversy during the second season of Jujutsu Kaisen.

== Cultural influence ==
Inspired by the series' concept, Japan launched Future Camp, an initiative aimed at selecting and cultivating young Japanese football talents.

== See also ==
- Tesla Note, another manga series illustrated by Kōta Sannomiya
