= Muneyuki Kaneshiro =

Japanese manga artist (born 09.12.1987)

Muneyuki Kaneshiro 金城宗幸
- Born: 1987 (age 38–39)
- Area: Manga writer
- Notable works: As the Gods Will; Jagaaan; Blue Lock
- Awards: 45th Kodansha Manga Award in the shōnen category

Muneyuki Kaneshiro (Japanese: 金城宗幸, Hepburn: Kaneshiro Muneyuki; born 1987) is a Japanese manga writer. He debuted in 2011 with As the Gods Will, which was adapted into a live-action film. After serializing several other works, he launched Blue Lock with Yusuke Nomura in 2018, which won the 45th Kodansha Manga Award in the shōnen category.

== Biography ==
Kaneshiro was born in 1987 and is a native of Osaka Prefecture. He graduated from Kyoto Seika University under its Manga Production course. Kaneshiro debuted as a manga artist in 2011, with the story for As the Gods Will, which released its first chapter on February 9, 2011. The first series was completed on October 9, 2012, with a second series starting on January 16, 2013. The second series finished on December 28, 2016. In December 2013, it was reported the manga had sold 1.5 million copies. The series also received a live-action film adaptation.

In August 2011, Kaneshiro did the story for a manga adaptation of Konami's social network game Dragon Collection. In 2015, Kaneshiro did the story for the manga Bokutachi ga Yarimashita, which received a live-action television series adaptation. Starting on February 6, 2017, he did the story for the manga Jagaaan. Starting in July 2017, he did the story for Gnoshros.

On August 1, 2018, he launched Blue Lock with Yusuke Nomura. In August 2021, it was reported that Blue Lock had over 4.5 million copies in circulation. The series won the 45th Kodansha Manga Award in the shōnen category in 2021. An anime television series adaptation premiered in October 2022.

== Works ==
- As the Gods Will (神さまの言うとおり, Kami-sama no Iu Tōri) (2011–2012) (serialized in Bessatsu Shōnen Magazine; illustrated by Akeji Fujimura)
  - As the Gods Will: The Second Series (神さまの言うとおり弐, Kami-sama no Iu Toori Ni) (2013–2016) (serialized in Weekly Shōnen Magazine; illustrated by Akeji Fujimura)
- Dragon Collection: Ryū o Suberu Mono (ドラゴンコレクション 竜を統べるもの) (2011–2012) (serialized in Weekly Shōnen Magazine; illustrated by Kyōta Shibano)
- Billion Dogs (ビリオンドッグズ) (2014–2017) (serialized in Manga Box; illustrated by Naoki Serizawa)
- Bokutachi ga Yarimashita (僕たちがやりました) (2015–2017) (serialized in Weekly Young Magazine; illustrated by Hikaru Araki)
- Jagaaan (ジャガーン, Jagān) (2017–2021) (serialized in Big Comic Spirits; illustrated by Kensuke Nishida)
- Grashros (グラシュロス) (2017–2018) (serialized in Weekly Young Magazine; illustrated by Akeji Fujimura)
- Blue Lock (ブルーロック, Burū Rokku) (2018–present) (serialized in Weekly Shōnen Magazine; illustrated by Yusuke Nomura)
- Super Ball Girls (スーパーボールガールズ, Sūpā Bōru Gāruzu) (2022–2026) (serialized in Big Comic Superior; illustrated by Akira Hiramoto)
