= Evening (magazine) =

Japanese manga magazine

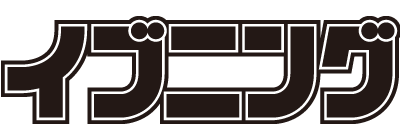

- Cover of the second issue of Evening in 2009, featuring Young Shima Kōsaku Shunin-hen
- Categories: Seinen manga
- Frequency: Monthly (2001–2003); Biweekly (2003–2023)
- Circulation: 42,467; (July – September 2022)
- First issue: August 20, 2001
- Final issue: February 28, 2023
- Company: Kodansha
- Country: Japan
- Based in: Tokyo
- Language: Japanese
- Website: Official website

Evening (Japanese: イブニング, Hepburn: Ibuningu) was a Japanese seinen manga magazine published by Kodansha from 2001 to 2023. Originally a sister magazine of Morning titled Morning Shin Magnum Zōkan (モーニング新マグナム増刊; lit. 'Morning New Magnum Special Issue'), it was renamed and launched as Monthly Evening in 2001, publishing new issues once every month. After the magazine's editorial department became independent from Morning in 2003, it rebranded itself as Evening and moved to publishing new issues biweekly, on the second and fourth Tuesdays of each month. Circulation was reported by the Japan Magazine Publishers Association at 115,617 copies in 2015.

In December 2022, the magazine announced that it will end publication on February 28, 2023, with its editorial department to merge back with Morning's. Some ongoing titles that were serialized in the magazine were moved to Kodansha's Comic Days website.

== List of serialized manga ==
=== 2000s ===
- Koi Kaze by Motoi Yoshida (2001–2004)
- Young Shima Kōsaku by Kenshi Hirokane (2001–2006)
- Sakuran by Moyoco Anno (2001–2003)
- Scout Seishirō (スカウト誠四郎) by Norifusa Mita (2001–2003)
- Aah! Harimanada: Gaiden Isao by Kei Sadayasu (2001–2005)
- What's Michael? 9-Kanme by Makoto Kobayashi (2001–2003)
- Mister Ajikko II by Daisuke Terasawa (2003–2012)
- Yugo the Negotiator by Shinji Makari (story) and Shū Akana (art) (2004–2015)
- K2 by Kazuo Mafune (2004–2023) (moved to Comic Days)
- Shamo by Izo Hashimoto (story) and Akio Tanaka (art) (2004–2015) (moved from Manga Action)
- Moyasimon: Tales of Agriculture by Masayuki Ishikawa (2004–2013) (moved to Monthly Morning Two)
- Garōden by Baku Yumemakura (story) and Keisuke Itagaki (art) (2005–2010) (moved from Young Magazine Uppers)
- Yama Onna Kabe Onna (山おんな壁おんな) by Atsuko Takakura (2005–2010)
- Shojo Fight by Yoko Nihonbashi (2005–2023) (moved to Comic Days)
- Young Shima Kōsaku Shunin-hen by Kenshi Hirokane (2006–2010)
- You're Being Summoned, Azazel by Kubo Yasuhisa (2007–2018)
- Moteki by Mitsurou Kubo (2008–2010)
- All-Rounder Meguru by Hiroki Endo (2008–2016)
- Captain Alice (CAPTAINアリス) by Yuzo Takada (2009–2013)
- Noririn (のりりん) by Mohiro Kitoh (2009–2015)
- Tōmei Axle (透明アクセル) by Norifusa Mita (2009–2010)

=== 2010s ===
- Blood Alone by Masayuki Takano (2010–2014)
- Kakarichō Shima Kōsaku by Kenshi Hirokane (2010–2013)
- Ōgari (王狩) by Sachiko Aoki (2010–2011)
- Yoiko no Mokushiroku (よいこの黙示録) by Kei Aoyama (2010–2011)
- Aventurier (アバンチュリエ) by Takashi Morita (2011–2013)
- Sanzoku Diary by Kentarō Okamoto (2011–2016)
- Battle Angel Alita: Last Order by Yukito Kishiro (2011–2014, moved from Ultra Jump)
- Lovely Muco by Takayuki Mizushina (2011–2020)
- Hitsuji no Ki by Tatsuhiko Yamagami (story) and Mikio Igarashi (art) (2011–2014)
- Narihirabashi Denki Shōten (なりひらばし電器商店) by Hisae Iwaoka (2012–2013)
- Bye-Bye Beanbag by Kazuyoshi Takeda (2012–2013)
- Boys Be… Adult Season by Masahiro Itabashi (story) and Hiroyuki Tamakoshi (art) (2012–2013)
- Kasane by Daruma Matsuura (2013–2018)
- Shōta no Sushi 2: World Stage by Daisuke Terasawa (2013–2015)
- Gakusei Shima Kōsaku by Kenshi Hirokane (2013–2017)
- Inuyashiki by Hiroya Oku (2014–2017)
- Kaizoku to yobareta otoko by Naoki Hyakuta (story) and Souichi Moto (art) (2014–2017)
- Deathtopia by Yoshinobu Yamada (2014–2016)
- Battle Angel Alita: Mars Chronicle (銃夢火星戦記, Ganmu Kasei Senki) by Yukito Kishiro (2014–2022) (moved to Comic Days)
- Kami-sama no Joker (神様のジョーカー) by Michiharu Kusunoki (story) and Mizu Sahara (art) (2015–2016)
- Gereksiz by Minoru Furuya (2016–2017)
- Op: Yoake Itaru no Iro no Nai Hibi (Op -オプ- 夜明至の色のない日々) by Kou Yoneda (2016–2023)
- Kannō-sensei (官能先生) by Motoi Yoshida (2016–2023) (moved to Monthly Morning Two)
- JJM: Joshi Judou-bu Monogatari (JJM 女子柔道部物語) by Yuko Emoto (story) and Makoto Kobayashi (story, art) (2016–2023) (moved to Comic Days)
- Sanzoku Diary SS by Kentarō Okamoto (2016–2017)
- Rieux o Machinagara by Ao Akato (2017–2018)
- Hayabusa Chan mo Tondemasu (隼ちゃんもとんでます) by Mohiro Kitoh (2017–2023)
- Sōsei no Taiga (創世のタイガ) by Kouji Mori (2017–2023)
- Gakusei Shima Kōsaku: Shūkatsu-hen by Kenshi Hirokane (2017–2018)
- Crusher Joe Rebirth (ラッシャージョウ REBIRTH) by Haruka Takachiho (story) and Yu Harii (art) (2017–2023)
- Kindaichi 37-sai no Jikenbo (金田一37歳の事件簿) by Shin Kibayashi (story) and Fumiya Satō (art) (2018–2023) (moved to Comic Days)
- Raw Hero by Akira Hiramoto (2018–2020)
- Solo Camping for Two (ふたりソロキャンプ, Futari Soro Kyanpu) by Yudai Debata (2018–2023) (moved to Comic Days)
- In Hand by Ao Akato (2018–2020)
- Island in a Puddle by Kei Sanbe (2019–2021)

=== 2020s ===
- Gurazeni: Natsunosuke no Seishun by Yūji Moritaka (story) and Yōsuke Uzumaki (art) (2020–2022)
- Legal Egg (リーガルエッグ) by Homura Kawamoto (story) and Yasoko Momen (art) (2020–2021)
- Karasu wa Aruji o Erabanai (烏は主を選ばない) by Chisato Abe (story) and Natsumi Matsuzaki (art) (2020–2021) (moved to Comic Days)
- A-bout! Surf by Masa Ishikawa (2021–2022)
- Kindaichi Shōnen no Jikenbo 30th (金田一少年の事件簿30th) by Shin Kibayashi (story) and Fumiya Satō (art) (2022–2023)
