= Hiramoto =

Hiramoto (written: 平本) is a Japanese surname. Notable people with the surname include:

- Akira Hiramoto (平本 アキラ; born 1976), Japanese manga artist
- Kazuki Hiramoto (平本 一樹; born 1981), Japanese footballer
