= Me and the Devil =

Me and the Devil may refer to:

- "Me and the Devil Blues", a 1937 blues song by Robert Johnson, with cover versions by, among others, Soap&Skin and Gil Scott-Heron
- Me and the Devil Blues, a 2003 manga series written and illustrated by Akira Hiramoto
- "Me and the Devil", a 2015 song by The Fratellis from the album Eyes Wide, Tongue Tied.
