= Bastard Swordsman (novel series) =

Japanese light novel series

- First light novel volume cover

バスタード・ソードマン (Basutādo Sōdoman)
- Genre: Isekai
- Novel series
- Written by: James Richman
- Published by: Hameln; Shōsetsuka ni Narō; Kakuyomu
- Original run: July 7, 2022 – present
- Light novel
- Written by: James Richman
- Illustrated by: Daiichi Matsuse
- Published by: Enterbrain
- Imprint: Famitsu Bunko
- Original run: May 30, 2023 – present
- Volumes: 8
- Manga
- Written by: James Richman
- Illustrated by: Mask the J
- Published by: ASCII Media Works
- Imprint: Dengeki Comics NEXT
- Magazine: Dengeki Comic Regulus
- Original run: January 19, 2024 – present
- Volumes: 4

Bastard Swordsman (バスタード・ソードマン, Basutādo Sōdoman) is a Japanese light novel series written by James Richman and illustrated by Daiichi Matsuse. It originally began serialization on the online publishing platform Hameln in July 2022, before being posted to the website Shōsetsuka ni Narō in September 2022. It was later picked up for publication by Enterbrain, which began releasing it as a light novel under their Famitsu Bunko imprint in May 2023; eight volumes have been released as of August 2026. A manga adaptation illustrated by Mask the J began serialization on ASCII Media Works' Dengeki Comic Regulus online service in January 2024 and has been compiled into four volumes as of June 2026.

== Plot ==
The series follows Mongrel, a guild member who was reincarnated from another world, although he has no memories of how he came into this world. He encounters a sword while visiting a weapons shop, and becomes attached to it despite being of moderate length. Despite being a guild member, he prefers to spend his days helping others and doing chores at the guild instead of fighting.

== Characters ==
Mongrel (モングレル, Mongureru)
A guild member who is the reincarnation of an unknown person. He has no memories of his previous life. He was born between the kingdoms of Harpelia and Sunglaire to parents who came from each kingdom; both died during a conflict between the two nations. Despite being gifted with magical skills and being potentially powerful enough to defeat strong monsters, he instead helps out with the guild and his neighbors. He uses a sword which he nicknames the Bastard Sword due to its short length compared to a long sword.
Ulrica (ウルリカ, Ururika)
Raina (ライナ, Raina)

== Media ==
=== Light novel ===
James Richman wrote the series with the intent to focus on the hero's daily life. He wanted to write the series based on his own personal preferences rather than the typical fantasy and isekai tropes. He wanted to write a fantasy novel featuring a protagonist familiar with modern technologies, a common fantasy trope, while putting his own twist on the theme. He cites manga such as Golden Kamuy and Sanzoku Diary as influences in writing the series. He used his experiences as a frequent camper in fleshing out the outdoor scenes.

Richman began posting the series on the online publishing platform Hameln on July 7, 2022, with him also posting the series on the website Shōsetsuka ni Narō from September 1, 2022. It is also posted on Kadokawa's online publishing platform Kakuyomu. Enterbrain later began publishing it as a light novel under their Famitsu Bunko imprint, featuring illustrations by Daiichi Matsuse. The first volume was released on May 30, 2023; eight volumes have been released as of August 2026.

No.	Japanese release date	Japanese ISBN
1	May 30, 2023	978-4-04-737441-6
2	October 30, 2023	978-4-04-737672-4
3	April 26, 2024	978-4-04-737870-4
4	September 30, 2024	978-4-04-738151-3
5	February 28, 2025	978-4-04-738254-1
6	August 29, 2025	978-4-04-738466-8
7	February 28, 2026	978-4-04-738767-6
8	August 28, 2026	978-4-04-500205-2

=== Manga ===
A manga adaptation illustrated by Mask the J began serialization on ASCII Media Works' Dengeki Comic Regulus online service on January 19, 2024, with the chapters being posted on Kadokawa's KadoComi service. The first tankōbon volume was released on September 27, 2024; four volumes have been released as of June 2026.

No.	Release date	ISBN
1	September 27, 2024	978-4-04-915879-3
2	April 25, 2025	978-4-04-916386-5
3	November 27, 2025	978-4-04-916788-7
4	June 26, 2026	978-4-04-952258-7

== Reception ==
The series was nominated for the 2024 edition of the Next Light Novel Award, placing 2nd in the Book category.
