= Peleliu: Guernica of Paradise =

Japanese manga series

- First tankōbon volume cover

ペリリュー -楽園のゲルニカ- (Periryū -Rakuen no Gerunika-)
- Genre: War
- Manga
- Written by: Kazuyoshi Takeda
- Published by: Hakusensha
- Imprint: Young Animal Comics
- Magazine: Young Animal
- Original run: February 12, 2016 – April 9, 2021
- Volumes: 11
- Manga

Peleliu Gaiden
- Written by: Kazuyoshi Takeda
- Published by: Hakusensha
- Imprint: Young Animal Comics
- Magazine: Young Animal
- Original run: July 21, 2021 – June 27, 2025
- Volumes: 4
- Anime film
- Directed by: Gorō Kuji
- Written by: Junji Nishimura; Kazuyoshi Takeda
- Music by: Kenji Kawai
- Studio: Shin-Ei Animation; Fugaku
- Released: December 5, 2025
- Runtime: 106 minutes
- icon

Peleliu: Guernica of Paradise (Japanese: ペリリュー -楽園のゲルニカ-, Hepburn: Periryū -Rakuen no Gerunika-) is a Japanese manga series written and illustrated by Kazuyoshi Takeda. It was serialized in Hakusensha's seinen manga magazine Young Animal from February 2016 to April 2021 and has been collected in eleven tankōbon volumes. A spin-off manga titled Peleliu Gaiden was serialized in Young Animal in July 2021 to June 2025. An anime film adaptation produced by Shin-Ei Animation and Fugaku premiered in December 2025.

== Synopsis ==
The story is set on the island of Peleliu taking part in the Battle of Peleliu during World War II and follows Private Tamaru during the summer of 1944. Unfortunately for Tamaru, a young soldier simply wishing to become a mangaka, he will quickly find himself in the heart of a terrible battlefield, where 10,000 Japanese soldiers will do their best to resist the onslaught of 40,000 American soldiers. Their only instruction: resist until the last.

== Characters ==
Hitoshi Tamaru (田丸均, Tamaru Hitoshi)
Voiced by: Rihito Itagaki
Keisuke Yoshiki (吉敷佳助, Yoshiki Keisuke)
Voiced by: Tomoya Nakamura

== Media ==
=== Manga ===
Written and illustrated by Kazuyoshi Takeda, Peleliu: Guernica of Paradise was serialized in Hakusensha's seinen manga magazine Young Animal from February 12, 2016, to April 9, 2021. The series was collected in eleven tankōbon volumes from July 2016 to July 2021.

A spin-off, titled Peleliu Gaiden, was announced at the end of the series in April 2021. It was serialized in Young Animal from July 21, 2021, to June 27, 2025. The spin-off was collected in four tankōbon volumes from July 2022 to July 2025.

==== Volumes ====
No.	Japanese release date	Japanese ISBN
1	July 29, 2016	978-4-592-14187-7
2	January 27, 2017	978-4-592-14188-4
3	July 28, 2017	978-4-592-14189-1
4	February 28, 2018	978-4-592-14190-7
5	July 27, 2018	978-4-592-16215-5
6	January 29, 2019	978-4-592-16216-2
7	July 29, 2019	978-4-592-16217-9
8	January 29, 2020	978-4-592-16218-6
9	July 29, 2020	978-4-592-16219-3
10	January 29, 2021	978-4-592-16220-9
11	July 29, 2021	978-4-592-16365-7

==== Peleliu Gaiden ====
No.	Japanese release date	Japanese ISBN
1	July 29, 2022	978-4-592-16366-4
2	July 28, 2023	978-4-592-16367-1
3	July 29, 2024	978-4-592-16368-8
4	July 29, 2025	978-4-592-16369-5

=== Anime film ===
In April 2021, it was announced at the end of the manga's final chapter that the series would receive an anime adaptation. In January 2025, it was later confirmed that it would be a film adaptation. The film is produced by Shin-Ei Animation and Fugaku and directed by Gorō Kuji, with the screenplay written by Junji Nishimura and series creator Takeda, characters designed by Ryōji Nakamori, and music composed by Kenji Kawai. The film is distributed by Toei Company and premiered in Japanese theaters on December 5, 2025. The film's theme song is "Kiseki no Yō na Koto" (奇跡のようなこと; 'Something Like a Miracle'), performed by Mone Kamishiraishi.

== Reception ==
Peleliu: Guernica of Paradise was one of the Manga division's Jury Selections at the 20th and 21st Japan Media Arts Festival in 2017 and 2018. The series ranked twelfth in the 2018 edition of Takarajimasha's Kono Manga ga Sugoi! list of best manga for male readers; it ranked ninth in the 2022 edition. The series also won the Excellence Award at the 46th Japan Cartoonists Association Awards. In 2021, it was nominated for the 25th Tezuka Osamu Cultural Prize. The manga was again nominated for the 26th Tezuka Osamu Cultural Prize in 2022. In 2026, it was awarded the Tezuka Osamu Cultural Prize's Special Prize in its 30th edition.

== See also ==
- Bye-Bye Beanbag, another manga series by the same author
