= Hiroki Endo's Tanpenshu =

Japanese manga series

- First tankōbon volume cover

遠藤浩輝短編集 (Endō Hiroki Tanpenshū)
- Genre: Psychological drama
- Manga
- Written by: Hiroki Endo
- Published by: Kodansha
- English publisher: NA: Dark Horse Comics
- Imprint: Afternoon KC
- Magazine: Monthly Afternoon; (December 25, 1995 – February 25, 1997); Afternoon Season Zōkan; (October 10, 1999 – February 9, 2001)
- Original run: December 25, 1995 – February 9, 2001
- Volumes: 2
- icon

Hiroki Endo's Tanpenshu (Japanese: 遠藤浩輝短編集, Hepburn: Endō Hiroki Tanpenshū; lit. 'Hiroki Endo's Short Stories Collection') is a Japanese anthology manga series written and illustrated by Hiroki Endo. It is a collection of various one-shot stories originally published in Kodansha's seinen manga magazines Monthly Afternoon (1995 to 1997) and Afternoon Season Zōkan (1999 to 2001). They were collected in two tankōbon volumes, released on April 1998 and September 2002.

== Overview ==
Hiroki Endo's Tanpenshu is a series of one-shot stories that explore the darker aspects of the human psyche. Each story follows the point-of-view of someone or a group of people of varying backgrounds, including Hiroki Endo himself.

== Development ==
In the play in "For Those of Us Who Don't Believe in God", the story of American serial killer Henry Lee Lucas is recounted. It is evident that Hiroki Endo put effort into his research of the man, as a short bibliography is listed within the manga itself. It is implied that Lucas was the basis for the killer character within the play.

== Publication ==
Written and illustrated by Hiroki Endo, the collection of one-shot stories were first published in Kodansha's seinen manga magazines Monthly Afternoon and its spin-off, Afternoon Season Zōkan, from December 25, 1995, to February 9, 2001. (Note: List of stories and magazine published in: "The Crows, the Girl, and the Yakuza"—Monthly Afternoon (February 1996) (Note: Released on December 25, 1995.); "Because You're Definitely a Cute Girl"—Monthly Afternoon (March 1996) (Note: Released on January 25, 1996.); "For Those of Us Who Don't Believe in God"—Monthly Afternoon (April 1997) (Note: Released on February 25, 1997.); "Hang"—Afternoon Season Zōkan #6 (2001) (Note: Released on February 9, 2001.); "High School Girl 2000"—Afternoon Season Zōkan #1 (1999) (Note: Released on October 10, 1999.); "Platform"—Monthly Afternoon (November–December 1996) (Note: Released on September 25 and October 25, 1996, respectively.)) Two of the one-shots were Afternoon Shiki Shō winners: "The Crows, the Girl and the Yakuza" won the Shiki Prize for Autumn 1995, and "Because You're Definitely a Cute Girl", won the Grand Prize for Winter 1995. The stories were compiled in two tankōbon volumes, released on April 23, 1998, and September 21, 2002.

In October 2006, Dark Horse Comics announced that they had licensed the manga, simply titled Tanpenshu, for English distribution. Two volumes were released on January 17 and May 30, 2007.

=== Volumes ===
| No. | Original release date | Original ISBN | English release date | English ISBN |
|---|---|---|---|---|
| 1 | April 23, 1998 | 978-4-06-314175-7 | January 17, 2007 | 978-1-59307-637-5 |
1. "The Crows, the Girl and the Yakuza" (カラスと少女とヤクザ, Karasu to Shōjo to Yakuza); 2. "Because You're Definitely a Cute Girl" (きっとかわいい女の子だから, Kitto Kawaii Onnanokodakara); 3. "For Those of Us Who Don't Believe in God" (神様なんて信じていない僕らのために, Kamisama nante Shinjite Inai Bokura no Tame ni)
Compiles stories from the February and March 1996 issues, and April 1997 issue of Monthly Afternoon. "The Crows, the Girl and the Yakuza" A lone yakuza member takes refuge from a gang war with a young woman who seems to have formed a strange relationship with crows. During his time with her, he comes to reconsider the course of his own life. "Because You're Definitely a Cute Girl" A girl's bewilderment over sex is overloaded by her widower father's decision to take a lover, driving her to a sudden swing from passive indifference to reactionary violence. "For Those of Us Who Don't Believe in God" Centers around a group of college drama students preparing and performing a play depicting a conversation between a serial killer and the sister of one of his victims. The process causes the group to reflect and ultimately confront their own individual problems.
| 2 | September 21, 2002 | 978-4-06-314275-4 | May 30, 2007 | 978-1-59307-645-0 |
4. "Hang"; 5. "High School Girl 2000" (女子高生2000, Joshikōsei Nisen); 6. "Platform" (プラットホーム, Purattohōmu); 7. "Boys Don't Cry" (ボーイズ・ドント・クライ, Bōizu Donto Kurai)
Compiles stories from the #6 and #1 issues of Afternoon Season Zōkan, the November and December 1996 issues of Monthly Afternoon, along with a newly written story for the volume titled "Boys Don't Cry". "Hang" A young couple and a cyborg head travels to see the "end of the world" in a post-apocalyptic setting where Earth is literally hanging by massive cables. Some pages with explicit sex were redrawn and toned down for the collected edition, but the English edition by Dark Horse has the original uncensored pages. "High School Girl 2000" A semi-autobiographical story, Hiroki Endo becomes distracted from work and goes through a brief midlife crisis. "Platform" A son estranged from his father and older brother for being yakuza is in love with a girl that his father uses for sex. The son's attempts to stop him end in tragedy. "Boys Don't Cry" A teenage boy and a girl have a conversation about sexuality while on a rooftop.

== Reception ==
Series of panels from "High School Girl 2000" (Dark Horse Comics edition).

Hiroki Endo's Tanpenshu received positive reviews and has been compared to Endo's more well-known work, Eden: It's an Endless World!.

In a review of the first Dark Horse Comics volume, Katherine Dacey of Pop Culture Shock graded it a B, praising the first story "The Crows, the Girl and the Yakuza" for giving depth to its characters while calling the other stories more "uneven" in its writing. David F. Smith of Newtype USA positively reviewed the first volume, noting the grimness in its stories that, for the first two, "end in tragedy, although knowing that in advance won't rob either tale of its power." He highlighted the final story, "For Those of Us Who Don't Believe in God", for its richness in its characters and dialogue.

In a review of the second Dark Horse Comics volume, Eduardo M. Chavez of Mania graded it an A+, comparing it to Eden with how it "features all the same ingredients that make [Eden] work so well – the violence, the sexuality, the humanity and Endo's strange sense of humor which verges on the perverse at times." He highlighted "High School Girl 2000" and "Hang" as stories that stood out.
