= Rieux o Machinagara =

Japanese manga series

- First tankōbon volume cover

リウーを待ちながら (Riū o Machinagara)
- Genre: Medical; Suspense
- Manga
- Written by: Ao Akato
- Published by: Kodansha
- Imprint: Evening KC
- Magazine: Evening
- Original run: January 10, 2017 – January 23, 2018
- Volumes: 3
- icon

Rieux o Machinagara (Japanese: リウーを待ちながら, Hepburn: Riū o Machinagara; lit. 'While Waiting for Rieux') (Note: The title is a reference to Dr. Rieux, a character from the novel The Plague, and the play Waiting for Godot.) is a Japanese manga series written and illustrated by Ao Akato. It was serialized in Kodansha's seinen manga magazine Evening from January 2017 to January 2018, with its chapters collected in three tankōbon volumes.

== Publication ==
Written and illustrated by Ao Akato, Rieux o Machinagara was serialized in Kodansha's seinen manga magazine Evening from January 10, 2017, to January 23, 2018. Kodansha collected chapters in three tankōbon volumes, released from June 23, 2017, to March 23, 2018.

In France, the manga has been licensed by Kana, which published it under the title Contamination.

=== Volumes ===
No.	Japanese release date	Japanese ISBN
1	June 23, 2017	978-4-06-354678-1
2	October 23, 2017	978-4-06-354696-5
3	March 23, 2018	978-4-06-511134-5

== See also ==
- In Hand, another manga series by the same author
