= Human Crossing =

Japanese anime and manga series

- First edition of Human Crossing, published by Shogakukan on October 1, 1981

人間交差点(ヒューマンスクランブル) (Hyūman Sukuranburu)
- Manga
- Written by: Masao Yajima
- Illustrated by: Kenshi Hirokane
- Published by: Shogakukan
- Magazine: Big Comic Original
- Original run: July 5, 1980 – December 20, 1991
- Volumes: 27
- Anime television series
- Directed by: Issei Kume
- Studio: A.C.G.T
- Licensed by: NA: Maiden Japan
- Original network: TV Tokyo
- English network: US: iaTV
- Original run: April 5, 2003 – June 28, 2003
- Episodes: 13

Human Crossing, originally titled Human Scramble (Japanese: 人間交差点(ヒューマンスクランブル), Hepburn: Hyūman Sukuranburu), is a Japanese manga written by Masao Yajima and illustrated by Kenshi Hirokane. The manga is about a series of unrelated stories of people's life and their lessons in life. Human Crossing received the 1985 Shogakukan Manga Award for the General category.

== Media ==
=== Manga ===
Shogakukan published Human Crossing in 27 tankōbon volumes between October 1, 1981, and March 1, 1991. The series was republished into 19 bunkoban between November 17, 1994, and June 15, 1996.

==== Volumes ====
No.	Release date	ISBN
1	October 1, 1981	4-09-180391-1
2	November 1, 1981	4-09-180392-X
3	September 1, 1982	4-09-180393-8
4	August 1, 1983	4-09-180394-6
5	February 1, 1984	4-09-180395-4
6	August 1, 1984	4-09-180396-2
7	December 1, 1984	4-09-180397-0
8	March 1, 1985	4-09-180398-9
9	October 1, 1985	4-09-180399-7
10	April 1, 1986	4-09-180400-4
11	August 1, 1986	4-09-181131-0
12	November 1, 1986	4-09-181132-9
13	January 1, 1987	4-09-181133-7
14	March 1, 1987	4-09-181134-5
15	May 1, 1987	4-09-181135-3
16	July 1, 1987	4-09-181136-1
17	December 1, 1987	4-09-181137-X
18	March 1, 1988	4-09-181138-8
19	April 1, 1988	4-09-181139-6
20	December 1, 1988	4-09-181140-X
21	April 1, 1989	4-09-181751-3
22	August 1, 1989	4-09-181752-1
23	December 1, 1989	4-09-181753-X
24	April 1, 1990	4-09-181754-8
25	August 1, 1990	4-09-181755-6
26	December 1, 1990	4-09-181756-4
27	March 1, 1991	4-09-181757-2

=== Anime ===
The series was adapted into a 13-episode anime in 2003 by A.C.G.T and produced by OB Planning. Directed by Issei Kume, it was broadcast on TV Tokyo between April 5, 2003, and June 28, 2003. It was licensed by Geneon in 2004. Each episode is a separate story of little relevance to each other. The anime is released in France by Kazé, and in Taiwan by Muse Communication.

The anime uses two pieces of theme song. "REVENGE ~Asu e no Chigai~" by Nana Katase is the opening theme, while "Believing" by Aki Asahina is the ending theme.

Geneon released a set of four DVDs for Human Crossing. They released the first DVD, Human Crossing - The 25th Hour on February 8, 2005, the second DVD, Human Crossing, Vol. 2: The Cicadas of Winter on April 26, 2005, the third DVD, Human Crossing, Vol. 3: Message in White on June 28, 2005, and the fourth and final DVD, Human Crossing, Vol. 4: Instructor's Rain on August 30, 2005. On March 13, 2007, Geneon released Human Crossing: Complete Brick Pack, which contains all four DVDs of the anime.

Maiden Japan has licensed the anime series.

==== Episodes ====
No.	Title	Original release date
1	"The Wound"; Transliteration: "Kizu" (Japanese: 傷)	April 5, 2003
2	"The 25th Hour"; Transliteration: "Hatsuyuki Ni Jū Go Ji" (Japanese: 初雪25時)	April 12, 2003
3	"A Promise"; Transliteration: "Yakusoku" (Japanese: 約束)	April 19, 2003
4	"Direction"; Transliteration: "Yukue" (Japanese: 行方)	April 26, 2003
5	"The Cicadas of Winter"; Transliteration: "Fuyu no Semi" (Japanese: 冬の蝉)	May 3, 2003
6	"The Beautiful Afterimage"; Transliteration: "Sougon Na Zanzō" (Japanese: 荘厳な残像)	May 10, 2003
7	"Sidelined"; Transliteration: "Sasen" (Japanese: 左遷)	May 17, 2003
8	"Message in White"; Transliteration: "Shiroi Henji (Messeeji)" (Japanese: 白い返事 (メッセージ))	May 24, 2003
9	"Smile"; Transliteration: "Bishō" (Japanese: 微笑)	May 31, 2003
10	"Street"; Transliteration: "Machi" (Japanese: 街)	June 7, 2003
11	"Whisper"; Transliteration: "Sasayaki" (Japanese: ささやき)	June 14, 2003
12	"Instructor's Rain"; Transliteration: "Kyōkan no Ame" (Japanese: 教官の雨)	June 21, 2003
13	"Watershed"; Transliteration: "Bunsuirei" (Japanese: 分水嶺)	June 28, 2003

=== Albums ===
Avex trax released a soundtrack CD on Human Crossing anime's ending theme called, Human Scramble - Believing, on June 4, 2003. The CD uses Bobby Caldwell, Marsga Randcliffe and Debra Shane lyrics. It was sung by Aki Asahina. On July 16, 2003, Hiboom released a soundtrack CD for Human Scramble, containing the opening and ending themes of the anime. On January 7, 2005, Universal Music released a CD for Human Scramble, which was sung by Shinji Tanimura. On March 11, 2009, Universal Music created a SHM-CD version of Shinji Tanimura's 10-part album, which includes "Ningen Kosaten - Human Scramble".

== Reception ==
Anime News Network's Theron Martin criticized "The 25th Hour" episode, "which comes off as preachy, improbable, and forced" but he also commended the "Direction" episode for its "poignancy and emotional appeal" at the end. Anime News Network's Carlo Santos criticized the second DVD of Human Crossing because of its animation, labeling it "stiff" and "choppy". Mania's Jennifer Rocks commented on the "stand-alone" nature of each episode more saying that it might be more rewarding if the anime is "viewed as a cultural study, rather than as pure entertainment". DVD Talk's Don Houston commended the anime on its "background detail" and wrote that many of the episodes had a "universal appeal".
