= Super Ball Girls =

Japanese manga series

- First tankōbon volume cover

スーパーボールガールズ (Sūpā Bōru Gāruzu)
- Genre: Harem; Horror; Science fiction
- Manga
- Written by: Muneyuki Kaneshiro
- Illustrated by: Akira Hiramoto
- Published by: Shogakukan
- English publisher: NA: Yen Press
- Magazine: Big Comic Superior
- Original run: October 14, 2022 – January 9, 2026
- Volumes: 7
- icon

Super Ball Girls (Japanese: スーパーボールガールズ, Hepburn: Sūpā Bōru Gāruzu) is a Japanese manga series written by Muneyuki Kaneshiro and illustrated by Akira Hiramoto. It was serialized in Shogakukan's seinen manga magazine Big Comic Superior from October 2022 to January 2026.

== Plot ==
Eita Ichiyoshi is a young man who works at a chocolate factory. He grew bored of the low pay and monotony of his life. One day, while walking home, he encounters a mysterious "super ball". After throwing it, a beautiful woman appears before him. This marks the beginning of his extraordinary journey.

The story follows the everyday the life of Ichiyoshi as he battles with what comes of being the caretaker and love interest of these horrific, yet beautiful girl-creatures.

== Publication ==
Written by Muneyuki Kaneshiro and illustrated by Akira Hiramoto, Super Ball Girls was serialized in Shogakukan's seinen manga magazine Big Comic Superior from October 14, 2022, to January 9, 2026. Shogakukan has collected its chapters into individual tankōbon volumes. The first volume was released on February 28, 2023. As of February 27, 2026, seven volumes have been released.

In August 2024, Yen Press announced that they have licensed the manga for an English release in North America.

=== Volumes ===
| No. | Original release date | Original ISBN | English release date | English ISBN |
|---|---|---|---|---|
| 1 | February 28, 2023 | 978-4-0986-1583-4 | March 25, 2025 | 979-8-8554-0580-4 |
| 2 | August 30, 2023 | 978-4-0986-2551-2 | December 23, 2025 | 979-8-8554-0582-8 |
| 3 | February 29, 2024 | 978-4-0986-2713-4 | February 24, 2026 | 979-8-8554-1583-4 |
| 4 | August 30, 2024 | 978-4-0986-3025-7 | July 28, 2026 | 979-8-8554-2376-1 |
| 5 | February 28, 2025 | 978-4-0986-3179-7 | November 24, 2026 | 979-8-8554-3941-0 |
| 6 | August 29, 2025 | 978-4-0986-3539-9 | — | — |
| 7 | February 27, 2026 | 978-4-0986-3787-4 | — | — |
