= Solo Camping for Two =

Japanese manga and anime series

- First tankōbon volume cover, featuring Gen Kinokura (front) and Shizuku Kusano (back)

ふたりソロキャンプ (Futari Soro Kyanpu)
- Genre: Comedy; Slice of life
- Manga
- Written by: Yudai Debata
- Published by: Kodansha
- English publisher: Kodansha (digital)
- Imprint: Evening KC
- Magazine: Evening (October 9, 2018 – February 28, 2023); Comic Days (April 21 – May 19, 2023); Morning (December 14, 2023 – present)
- Original run: October 9, 2018 – present
- Volumes: 25
- Television drama
- Directed by: Takashi Ninomiya; Katsutoshi Hirabayashi
- Written by: Ayako Kitagawa
- Studio: Headquarters
- Original network: Tokyo MX
- Original run: January 9, 2025 – February 27, 2025
- Episodes: 8
- Anime television series
- Directed by: Jun Hatori
- Written by: Aya Satsuki; Mitsuho Seta; Ōka Tanisaki
- Music by: Shōta Kowashi
- Studio: SynergySP
- Licensed by: Crunchyroll; SA/SEA: Medialink
- Original network: Tokyo MX, BS Asahi, NCC, ytv
- Original run: July 11, 2025 – December 19, 2025
- Episodes: 24
- icon

Solo Camping for Two (Japanese: ふたりソロキャンプ, Hepburn: Futari Soro Kyanpu) is a Japanese camping-themed manga series written and illustrated by Yudai Debata. It was serialized in Kodansha's seinen manga magazine Evening from October 2018 to February 2023, when the magazine ceased its publication. Following a brief run in the Comic Days manga app, the series resumed in Morning in December 2023. Its chapters have been collected in 24 tankōbon volumes as of June 2026.

A live-action television drama adaptation aired from January to February 2025, and an anime television series adaptation produced by SynergySP aired from July to December of the same year.

== Plot ==
Gen Kinokura, a 34-year-old man, loves solo camping and values quiet time alone in nature. During one of his usual trips, his peaceful routine is interrupted when Shizuku Kusano, a 20-year-old beginner with almost no camping experience, suddenly shows up at his campsite after getting lost and arriving unprepared. With no tent and no real knowledge of camping, she ends up relying on Gen for help.

Although Gen prefers to camp alone and initially wants nothing to do with her, he reluctantly teaches Shizuku basic camping skills so she can take care of herself. After this first encounter, Shizuku decides that Gen is the perfect person to learn from and begins showing up on his future camping trips. To deal with this, the two make an arrangement: they will camp together, but each of them will keep their own space and independence, as if they were solo camping. As they continue camping together, Shizuku gradually improves her skills, while Gen slowly warms up to having someone around.

== Characters ==
Gen Kinokura (樹乃倉 巌, Kinokura Gen)
Voiced by: Daiki Hamano
Portrayed by: Win Morisaki
An expert 34-year-old out-and-out solo camper who enjoys the quiet solitude away from the city, being able to appreciate nature.
Shizuku Kusano (草野 雫, Kusano Shizuku)
Voiced by: Mizuki Niizaki
Portrayed by: Miyu Honda
A 20-year-old junior college student with little experience about camping alone. She coerces Gen to be her mentor in order to develop her solo camping skills by camping together until she is able to manage on her own.
Akihito Takigawa (滝川 彰人, Takigawa Akihito)
Voiced by: Yōhei Azakami
Portrayed by: Yu Inaba
Mizuki Hino (火野 瑞希, Hino Mizuki)
Voiced by: Yuna Nemoto
Portrayed by: Saki Miyashita
Saya Ozora (大空 さや, Ōzora Saya)
Voiced by: Saya Aizawa
Portrayed by: Erika Takizawa

== Media ==
=== Manga ===
Written and illustrated by Yudai Debata, Solo Camping for Two debuted in Kodansha's seinen manga magazine Evening, under the title Hitori, Yaei Nite Omofu (独り、野営にて思ふ). Evening ceased its publication on February 28, 2023, and the series finished its first part in the last issue. Following three special chapters published in the Comic Days manga app from April 21 to May 19, 2023, the series resumed in Morning on December 14 of the same year. Kodansha has collected its chapters into individual tankōbon volumes, with the first volume released on March 22, 2019. As of October 22, 2026, 25 volumes have been released.

Kodansha started publishing the manga digitally in English on its K Manga service in June 2025.

==== Volumes ====
No.	Japanese release date	Japanese ISBN
1	March 22, 2019	978-4-06-514905-8
2	May 23, 2019	978-4-06-516174-6
3	August 6, 2019	978-4-06-516945-2
4	November 21, 2019	978-4-06-518010-5
5	March 23, 2020	978-4-06-518923-8
6	May 22, 2020	978-4-06-519585-7
7	August 11, 2020	978-4-06-520490-0
8	December 23, 2020	978-4-06-521819-8
9	March 23, 2021	978-4-06-522678-0; 978-4-06-523424-2 (LE)
10	July 14, 2021	978-4-06-524044-1; 978-4-06-524605-4 (LE)
11	November 22, 2021	978-4-06-525887-3; 978-4-06-525886-6 (LE)
12	March 23, 2022	978-4-06-527124-7; 978-4-06-527125-4 (LE)
13	July 22, 2022	978-4-06-528464-3
14	November 22, 2022	978-4-06-529761-2
15	April 21, 2023	978-4-06-530943-8
16	July 21, 2023	978-4-06-532426-4; 978-4-06-532536-0 (LE)
17	April 23, 2024	978-4-06-535251-9
18	July 23, 2024	978-4-06-536019-4
19	November 21, 2024	978-4-06-537522-8
20	April 23, 2025	978-4-06-538635-4
21	July 23, 2025	978-4-06-539894-4
22	November 21, 2025	978-4-06-541353-1
23	February 20, 2026	978-4-06-542661-6
24	June 23, 2026	978-4-06-543667-7
25	October 22, 2026	978-4-06-544975-2

=== Drama ===
A live-action television drama adaptation was announced on November 15, 2024. The drama is directed by Takashi Ninomiya and Katsutoshi Hirabayashi, with scripts written by Ayako Kitagawa. It aired from January 9 to February 27, 2025, on Tokyo MX.

=== Anime ===
An anime television series adaptation was announced in January 2025. It is produced by SynergySP and directed by Jun Hatori, with series composition by Aya Satsuki and screenplays by Satsuki, Mitsuho Seta and Ōka Tanisaki, character designs by Tomomi Shimazaki, and music composed by Shōta Kowashi. The series aired from July 11 to December 19, 2025, on Tokyo MX and other networks. (Note: Tokyo MX listed the series premiere on July 10 at 24:30, which is effectively July 11 at 12:30 a.m. JST.) The first opening theme song is "Akari wa Tōku" (灯りは遠く; 'The Light is Far Away'), performed by Skirt, and the second opening theme song is "Futari de Iyō ka" (ふたりでいようか; 'Shall we Be Together'), performed by Hokuto, while the series' ending theme song is "Futari Camp" (ふたりキャンプ), performed by Masayoshi Ōishi featuring Special Others.

Crunchyroll streamed the series. Medialink licensed the series in South and Southeast Asia for streaming on its Ani-One Asia's YouTube channel.

==== Episodes ====
No.	Title	Directed by (Note: Production staff information is taken from the ending credits of each episode.)	Written by	Storyboarded by	Original release date
1	"Pondering While Solo Camping"; Transliteration: "Hitori Yaei Nite Omofu" (Japanese: 独り野営にて思ふ)	Takatoshi Suzuki	Aya Satsuki	Jun Hatori	July 11, 2025
2	"Enjoy Going Solo"; Transliteration: "Soro o Tanoshime" (Japanese: 孤独(ソロ)を楽しめ)	Yūdai Takamoto	Aya Satsuki	Hitoyuki Matsui	July 18, 2025
3	"Beware of Gear Acquisition Traps"; Transliteration: "Gia Numa ni Goyōshin" (Japanese: ギア沼にご用心)	Shunji Yoshida	Aya Satsuki	Yukio Nishimoto	July 25, 2025
4	"What Do You Do While Camping"; Transliteration: "Kyanpu ni Itte, Nanisuruno?" (Japanese: キャンプに行って、何するの?)	Kenya Ueno	Mitsuho Seta	Hitoyuki Matsui	August 1, 2025
5	"The Path You Choose Yourself"; Transliteration: "Jibun de Erabu Michi" (Japanese: 自分で選ぶ道)	Takatoshi Suzuki	Ouka Tanisaka	Jun Hatori	August 8, 2025
6	"Master Mode"; Transliteration: "Shishō Mōdo" (Japanese: 師匠モード)	Kenya Ueno	Ouka Tanisaka	Hitoyuki Matsui	August 15, 2025
7	"The Origins of Going Solo"; Transliteration: "Soro no Hajimari" (Japanese: ソロのはじまり)	Kōji Sasaki	Aya Satsuki	Susumu Nishizawa	August 22, 2025
8	"Katsu! Use Gear Properly"; Transliteration: "Katsu! Dōgu wa Tadashiku Tsukae" (Japanese: 喝! 道具は正しく使え)	Shu Honma, Toshiteru Masamoto	Mitsuho Seta	Jun Hatori	August 29, 2025
9	"Occasionally, Like a Master"; Transliteration: "Tamani wa Shishōrashiku" (Japanese: たまには師匠らしく)	Takahide Ogata	Mitsuho Seta	Yuri Isowa	September 5, 2025
10	"Because I Like Gen-san"; Transliteration: "Gen-san ga, Sukidakara" (Japanese: 厳さんが、好きだから)	Masayuki Egami	Aya Satsuki	Hitoyuki Matsui	September 12, 2025
11	"Goodbye, Gen-kun"; Transliteration: "Sayōnara, Gen-kun" (Japanese: さようなら、厳くん)	Hitoyuki Matsui	Ouka Tanisaka	Susumu Nishizawa	September 19, 2025
12	"My Personal Preferences"; Transliteration: "Ore Dake no Kodawari" (Japanese: 俺だけのこだわり)	Kenya Ueno	Aya Satsuki	Hitoyuki Matsui	September 26, 2025
13	"What Do You Think of Shizuku?"; Transliteration: "Shizuku no Koto, Dō Omotterun Desu ka?" (Japanese: 雫のこと、どう思ってるんですか?)	Shu Honma, Toshiteru Masamoto	Aya Satsuki	Hitoyuki Matsui	October 3, 2025
14	"Dreaming While Camping Out Alone"; Transliteration: "Hitori Yaei Nite Yume o Omofu" (Japanese: 独り野営にて夢を思ふ)	Hitoyuki Matsui	Mitsuho Seta	Yuri Isowa	October 10, 2025
15	"Camping Like Ships Passing in the Night"; Transliteration: "Surechigai Kyanpu" (Japanese: すれちがいキャンプ)	Kenya Ueno	Ouka Tanisaki	Jun Hatori	October 17, 2025
16	"Graduation Test?!"; Transliteration: "Sotsugyō Shiken!?" (Japanese: 卒業試験!?)	Yudai Takamoto	Aya Satsuki	Hitoyuki Matsui	October 24, 2025
17	"You Don't Mind If I Take Him, Right?"; Transliteration: "Watashi ga Moratte mo, Mondainai yo ne?" (Japanese: ワタシがもらっても、問題ないよね?)	Thomson	Mitsuho Seta	Hitoyuki Matsui	October 31, 2025
18	"Solo Camping For Three"; Transliteration: "San-nin sorokyanputte Kotode" (Japanese: さんにんソロキャンプってことで)	Kenya Ueno	Aya Satsuki	Yoshiaki Okumura	November 7, 2025
19	"I'm Not Scared!"; Transliteration: "Bibitta Wakejanē!" (Japanese: びびったわけじゃねーっ!)	Hitoyuki Matsui	Ouka Tanisaka	Hitoyuki Matsui	November 14, 2025
20	"I Don't Want to Graduate Yet"; Transliteration: "Mada, Sotsugyō Shitakunai desu" (Japanese: まだ、卒業したくないです)	Kenya Ueno	Ouka Tanisaka	Hitoyuki Matsui	November 21, 2025
21	"What I Can Do"; Transliteration: "Watashi ni Dekiru Koto" (Japanese: 私にできること)	Hitoyuki Matsui	Aya Satsuki	Yuri Isowa	November 28, 2025
22	"A Dream Spun With Someone"; Transliteration: "Dareka to Tsumugu Yume" (Japanese: 誰かとつむぐ夢)	Kinya Nakamura	Mitsuho Seta	Hitoyuki Matsui	December 5, 2025
23	"Are You Giving It Serious Thought?"; Transliteration: "Shinken ni Kangaete Kuretemasu ka?" (Japanese: 真剣に考えてくれてますか?)	Kenya Ueno	Aya Satsuki	Yoshiaki Okamura	December 12, 2025
24	"We're Solo Campers For Two"; Transliteration: "Futari Soro Kyanpāda" (Japanese: ふたりソロキャンパーだ)	Yutaro Yamamoto, Takatoshi Suzuki	Aya Satsuki	Jun Hatori	December 19, 2025

== Reception ==
By December 2020, the manga had over 1 million copies in circulation (including digital versions). By November 2024, the manga had over 3 million copies in circulation. Solo Camping for Two was nominated for the 45th Kodansha Manga Award in the general category in 2021.
