= Hello Harinezumi =

Japanese manga series

- First tankōbon volume, featuring Goro Nanase
- Genre: Mystery, detective
- Manga
- Written by: Kenshi Hirokane
- Published by: Kodansha
- Magazine: Weekly Young Magazine
- Original run: 1980 – 1989
- Volumes: 24
- Original video animation

Domain of Murder
- Directed by: Hiroshi Morioka; Iku Suzuki
- Studio: Studio Deen
- Licensed by: Central Park Media
- Released: 1992
- Runtime: 51 minutes

Hello Harinezumi (Japanese: ハロー張りネズミ; lit. "Hello Hedgehog") is a Japanese manga series written and illustrated by Kenshi Hirokane. It was originally serialized in the manga magazine Weekly Young Magazine from 1980 to 1989. The series follows the exploits of Goro Nanase, a private detective in Tokyo. Hello Harinezumi has been adapted multiple times, including as a live-action film, an original video animation (OVA), and multiple live-action television dramas.

== Synopsis ==
Goro Nanase and his partner Hisaku Kogure are private detectives at the Akatsuka Detective Agency in Itabashi, Tokyo. Goro has earned the nickname "Harinezumi" (ハリネズミ; lit. "Hedgehog") from his colleagues due to his unkempt hair, which resembles the spikes of a hedgehog. The series follows the pair in an episodic format as they solve cases covering a range of themes and subjects, from realistic occurrences to paranormal phenomena.

== Media ==
=== Manga ===
Hello Harinezumi was serialized in Kodansha's manga magazine Weekly Young Magazine from 1980 to 1989. The company later published the series as 24 collected volumes.

=== Adaptations ===
In 1991, a live-action film adaptation of Hello Harinezumi starring Toshiaki Karasawa as Goro was released.

In 1992, an original video animation (OVA) titled Hello Harinezumi: Domain of Murder (ハロー張りネズミ〜殺意の領分〜) was released, directed by Hiroshi Morioka and Iku Suzuki, and featuring Shigeru Nakahara as the voice of Goro. The OVA was licensed by Central Park Media for release in North America, where it was titled simply Domain of Murder.

In 1996, TBS Television aired Hello Harinezumi: Shoka no Kamakura (ハロー張りネズミ 初夏の鎌倉-箱根), a one-off live-action television special, as part of its Monday Drama Special programming block. It starred Naoto Ogata as Goro.

In 2005, the Taiwanese network Public Television Service produced a 30-episode live-action television drama adaptation of Hello Harinezumi titled Zhēntàn Wùyǔ (偵探物語, lit. 'Detective Story').

In 2017, TBS Television aired a ten-episode live-action television drama adaptation of Hello Harinezumi starring Eita Nagayama as Goro.
