= Aah! Harimanada =

Japanese manga series and its franchise

- First tankōbon volume cover

ああ播磨灘 (Ā Harimanada)
- Genre: Sports
- Manga
- Written by: Kei Sadayasu
- Published by: Kodansha
- Imprint: Morning KC
- Magazine: Morning Open Zōkan; (September 1988 – July 1989); Morning; (April 1990 – September 1996)
- Original run: September 1988 – September 1996
- Volumes: 28
- Anime television series
- Directed by: Yukio Okazaki
- Music by: Masamichi Amano
- Original network: TXN (TV Tokyo)
- Original run: April 23, 1992 – October 1, 1992
- Episodes: 23
- Video game
- Developer: Sega
- Publisher: Sega
- Music by: Hirofumi Murasaki; Morihiko Akiyama; Masayuki Nagao
- Genre: Fighting
- Platform: Game Gear, Game Boy, Sega Mega Drive
- Released: Game Gear: JP: July 2, 1993; Game Boy: JP: July 23, 1993; Mega Drive: JP: September 3, 1993
- Manga

Gaiden Isao
- Written by: Kei Sadayasu
- Published by: Kodansha
- Imprint: Evening KC
- Magazine: Evening
- Original run: September 19, 2001 – March 8, 2005
- Volumes: 6
- icon

Aah! Harimanada (Japanese: ああ播磨灘, Hepburn: Ā Harimanada) is a Japanese manga series written and illustrated by Kei Sadayasu. It was originally serialized in Kodansha's seinen manga magazines Morning Open Zōkan (1988 to 1989) and Morning (1990 to 1996), and published in 28 tankōbon volumes. An anime television series was broadcast in 1992. The series was later adapted to a video game developed and published by Sega for the Game Gear and Mega Drive. A port was also released on the Game Boy, released by ASK. A spin-off manga series by Sadayasu was published in Kodansha's Evening magazine from September 2001 to March 2005.

== Premise ==
On the first day of the September Professional Sumo Tournament, the new yokozuna Harimanada enters the ring wearing an eerie mask, surprising the audience. He then declares that he will break Futabayama's streak of 69 consecutive wins, and that he would retire on the spot if he loses even once. This invokes the wrath of the Japan Sumo Association and makes an enemy of all makuuchi wrestlers.

== Characters ==
Isao Harimanada (播磨灘 勲, Harimanada Isao) / Isao Yamagata (山形 勲, Yamagata Isao)
Voiced by: Akio Otsuka
The protagonist. Stands at 6'0" and weighs 335 pounds.
Oyakata Raikō (雷光 親方, Raikō Oyakata)
Voiced by: Kenichi Ogata
Harimanada's master.
Atagoyama (愛宕山)
Voiced by: Yuzuru Fujimoto
The Chairman of the Sumo Association. He is modeled after Wakanohana, the then-incumbent head of the real-life Sumo Association.
Yasokichi Fugaku (富嶽 八十吉, Fugaku Yasokichi) / Iote Iyaokea
Voiced by: Masahiro Anzai
A mountainous 550-pound Hawaiian ozeki. He is modeled after Konishiki.

== Media ==
=== Manga ===
Written and illustrated by Kei Sadayasu, Aah! Harimanada was first serialized in the special issue of Kodansha's seinen manga magazine Morning, Morning Open Zōkan, from its A to F issues (cover dated September 20, 1988, and August 1, 1989, respectively). It was then transferred to Morning in April 1990, starting with its 20th issue of that year, (Note: Cover dated May 3, 1990.) where it was serialized until September 1996, in its 40th issue of that year. (Note: Cover dated September 19, 1996.) Kodansha compiled its chapters in 28 tankōbon volumes, published between March 20, 1991, and December 14, 1996. The series was reissued in 14 bunkobon volumes, published between March 12 and August 9, 2002.

A spin-off manga by Sadayasu, titled Aah! Harimanada: Gaiden Isao (ああ播磨灘外伝ISAO), was serialized in Kodansha's seinen manga magazine Evening from September 19, 2001, (Note: Debuted in the magazine's October 2001 issue, published on September 19.) to March 8, 2005. (Note: Finished in the magazine's seventh issue of 2005, published on March 8.) Kodansha compiled its chapters in six tankōbon volumes, published between January 21, 2003, and April 22, 2005. A prequel to the main series, it focused on Isao Harimanada during his middle school years.

=== Anime ===
E&G Film produced an anime television series based on the manga, titled It Makes Me Feel Strong When I Watch It! Yokozuna Anime: Aah! Harimanada (見ると強くなる 痛快!横綱アニメ ああ播磨灘, Miru to Tsuyoku Naru Tsūkai! Yokozuna Anime: Ā Harimanada). It was directed by Yukio Okazaki and series supervised by Norio Osada. The series premiered in Japan on TV Tokyo on April 23, 1992, and ran for 23 episodes until its conclusion on October 1, 1992. Aah! Harimanada is notable as an animated series based on the rare theme of sumo wrestling; following the end of the series' broadcast, no other such series would be produced until the premiere of Rowdy Wrestler!! Matsutaro in 2014.

=== Video games ===
Aah! Harimanada was adapted into three video games of the same name in 1993. A Game Gear title was developed by Sega and released on July 2. A Game Boy title by Ask Kodansha was released on July 23. Sega also developed a title for the Mega Drive that was released on September 3. The Mega Drive game was criticized for its "poor responsiveness" and "boring gameplay". British gaming magazine Sega Pro rated the Mega Drive version 59 out of 100.
