= Yatagarasu (novel series) =

Japanese novel series by Chisato Abe

- Second novel volume cover

八咫烏
- Genre: Historical fantasy
- Novel series
- Written by: Chisato Abe
- Published by: Bungeishunjū
- Imprint: Bunshun Bunko
- Original run: June 26, 2012 – present
- Volumes: 11 + 2 side stories
- Manga

A Raven for All Seasons
- Written by: Chisato Abe
- Illustrated by: Natsumi Matsuzaki
- Published by: Kodansha
- English publisher: US: Kodansha
- Imprint: Evening KC
- Magazine: Comic Days
- Original run: June 23, 2018 – April 11, 2020
- Volumes: 4
- Manga

Karasu wa Aruji o Erabanai
- Written by: Chisato Abe
- Illustrated by: Natsumi Matsuzaki
- Published by: Kodansha
- Imprint: Evening KC
- Magazine: Evening; (August 25, 2020 – October 2021); Comic Days; (November 5, 2021 – present)
- Original run: August 25, 2020 – present
- Volumes: 6
- Anime television series

Yatagarasu: The Raven Does Not Choose Its Master
- Directed by: Yoshiaki Kyōgoku
- Written by: Yukiko Yamamuro
- Music by: Eishi Segawa
- Studio: Pierrot
- Licensed by: Crunchyroll
- Original network: NHK General TV
- Original run: April 6, 2024 – September 21, 2024
- Episodes: 20
- icon

Yatagarasu (Japanese: 八咫烏) is a Japanese novel series written by Chisato Abe. The series began publication by Bungeishunjū in June 2012, with eleven main volumes and two side story volumes being released as of March 2026. A manga adaptation of the first novel was serialized on Kodansha's Comic Days manga website from June 2018 to April 2020 and collected into four volumes. A manga adaptation of the second novel began serialization in Kodansha's Evening magazine in August 2020, before being transferred to the Comic Days website in November 2021. An anime television series adaptation of the first three novels produced by Pierrot aired from April to September 2024.

== Characters ==
Yukiya (雪哉)
Voiced by: Mutsumi Tamura
Wakamiya (若宮)
Voiced by: Miyu Irino
Asebi (あせび)
Voiced by: Rina Honnizumi
Hamayū (浜木綿)
Voiced by: Hiroki Nanami
Masuho no Susuki (真赭の薄)
Voiced by: Ayaka Fukuhara
Shiratama (白珠)
Voiced by: Rie Kugimiya
Sumio (澄尾)
Voiced by: Eiji Takeuchi
Natsuka (長束)
Voiced by: Satoshi Hino
Rokon (路近)
Voiced by: Hiroshi Shirokuma
Atsufusa (敦房)
Voiced by: Kengo Kawanishi
Fujinami (藤波)
Voiced by: Yoshino Aoyama
Ōmurasake no Omae (大紫の御前)
Voiced by: Atsuko Tanaka
Kōme (小梅)
Voiced by: Yume Miyamoto

== Media ==
=== Novels ===
==== First part ====
No.	Title	Release date	ISBN
1	Ravens Shouldn't Wear Kimono; Karasu ni Hitoe wa Niawanai (烏に単は似合わない)	June 26, 2012	978-4-16-381610-4
2	The Raven Does Not Choose Its Master; Karasu wa Aruji o Erabanai (烏は主を選ばない)	July 10, 2013	978-4-16-382280-8
3	The Golden Raven; Kin no Karasu (黄金の烏)	July 23, 2014	978-4-16-390095-7
4	Kūkan no Karasu (空棺の烏)	July 29, 2015	978-4-16-390302-6
5	Tamayori Hime (玉依姫)	July 21, 2016	978-4-16-390489-4
6	Iyasaka no Karasu (弥栄の烏)	July 28, 2017	978-4-16-390684-3

==== Second part ====
No.	Title	Release date	ISBN
1	Rakuen no Karasu (楽園の烏)	September 3, 2020	978-4-16-391254-7
2	Tsuioku no Karasu (追憶の烏)	August 23, 2021	978-4-16-391415-2
3	Karasu no Midoriba (烏の緑羽)	October 7, 2022	978-4-16-391602-6
4	Mochizuki no Karasu (望月の烏)	February 22, 2024	978-4-16-391806-8
5	Bōrei no Karasu (亡霊の烏)	March 26, 2026	978-4-16-391959-1

==== Side stories ====
No.	Title	Release date	ISBN
1	Karasu Hyakka: Hotaru no Shō (烏百花 蛍の章)	May 10, 2018	978-4-16-390835-9
2	Karasu Hyakka: Shirayuri no Shō (烏百花 白百合の章)	April 26, 2021	978-4-16-391361-2

=== Manga ===
A manga adaptation of the first novel, Karasu ni Hitoe wa Niawanai (烏に単は似合わない; "Ravens Shouldn't Wear Kimono"), illustrated by Natsumi Matsuzaki, was serialized on Kodansha's Comic Days manga website from June 23, 2018, to April 11, 2020, and collected into four volumes. The manga was published in English on Kodansha's K Manga app under the name A Raven for All Seasons.

A manga adaptation of the second novel, Karasu wa Aruji o Erabanai (烏は主を選ばない; "The Raven Does Not Choose Its Master"), also illustrated by Matsuzaki, began serialization in Kodansha's Evening manga magazine on August 25, 2020. It was later transferred to the Comic Days website beginning on November 5, 2021.

==== A Raven for All Seasons ====
No.	Release date	ISBN
1	November 14, 2018	978-4-06-513467-2; 978-4-06-514108-3 (SE)
2	May 7, 2019	978-4-06-515526-4; 978-4-06-516401-3 (SE)
3	October 9, 2019	978-4-06-517267-4
4	June 10, 2020	978-4-06-519948-0

==== Karasu wa Aruji o Erabanai ====
No.	Release date	ISBN
1	February 22, 2021	978-4-06-522456-4
2	August 23, 2021	978-4-06-524420-3
3	April 21, 2022	978-4-06-527496-5
4	February 21, 2023	978-4-06-530279-8
5	February 22, 2024	978-4-06-534648-8
6	March 23, 2026	978-4-06-542799-6

=== Anime ===
An anime television series adaptation of the first three novels, titled The Raven Does Not Choose Its Master after the second novel, was announced in October 2023. It was produced by Pierrot and directed by Yoshiaki Kyōgoku, with Yukiko Yamamuro overseeing series scripts, Takumo Norita designing the characters, and Eishi Segawa composing the music. The series aired from April 6 to September 21, 2024, on NHK General TV. The opening theme song is "Poi" performed by Saucy Dog. Crunchyroll streamed the series under the title Yatagarasu: The Raven Does Not Choose Its Master.

==== Episodes ====
No.	Title	Directed by (Note: Production staff information is taken from the ending credits of each episode.)	Animation directed by	Original release date
1	"A Lady Out of Place"; Transliteration: "Bachigaina Hime-gimi" (Japanese: 場違いな姫君)	Yoshiaki Kyougoku	Hiroaki Imaki & Momoko Nagakawa	April 6, 2024
2	"The Blockhead Second Son"; Transliteration: "Bonkura Jinan" (Japanese: ぼんくら次男)	Naoki Kotani	Hiroaki Imaki, Momoko Nagakawa, Minoru Murao, Yūji Kondō & Tomoyuki Matsumoto	April 13, 2024
3	"A True Golden Raven"; Transliteration: "Makoto no Kin'u" (Japanese: 真の金烏)	Shinya Kawatsura	Minoru Murao, Yuka Suzuki & Hiroaki Imaki	April 20, 2024
4	"An Imperial Council"; Transliteration: "Gozen Kaigi" (Japanese: 御前会議)	Naoki Kotani	Momoko Nagakawa, Reika Hoshino, Yūji Kondō, Tomoyuki Matsumoto & Hiroaki Imaki	April 27, 2024
5	"A Purge"; Transliteration: "Shukusei" (Japanese: 粛清)	Yoriyasu Kogawa	Minoru Murao, Shi Jie Zhu, Yuka Suzuki & Hiroaki Imaki	May 4, 2024
6	"A Tanabata Invitation"; Transliteration: "Tanabata no Sasoi" (Japanese: 七夕の誘い)	Shinya Kawatsura	Momoko Nagakawa, Yūji Kondō, Tomoyuki Matsumoto & Hiroaki Imaki	May 11, 2024
7	"Falling"; Transliteration: "Tenraku" (Japanese: 転落)	Toshiyuki Kato	Keizō Shimizu, Minoru Murao, Yūji Kondō, Tomoyuki Matsumoto & Hiroaki Imaki	May 18, 2024
8	"The Intruder"; Transliteration: "Shinnyūsha" (Japanese: 侵入者)	Yoriyasu Kogawa	Momoko Nagakawa, Yūji Kondō, Tomoyuki Matsumoto & Reika Hoshino	May 25, 2024
9	"Lady Raven"; Transliteration: "Karasuda-yū" (Japanese: 烏太夫(からすだゆう))	Kaoru Suzuki	Keizō Shimizu & Hiroaki Imaki	June 1, 2024
10	"Assassinating the Prince"; Transliteration: "Wakamiya Ansatsu" (Japanese: 若宮暗殺)	Shigenori Kageyama	Minoru Murao, Yūji Kondō, Tomoyuki Matsumoto & Reika Hoshino	June 8, 2024
11	"The Loyal Retainer"; Transliteration: "Chūshin" (Japanese: 忠臣)	Yoriyasu Kogawa	Momoko Nagakawa, Minoru Murao & Hiroaki Imaki	June 15, 2024
12	"To Choose a Consort"; Transliteration: "Kisaki Erabi" (Japanese: 后選び)	Kaoru Suzuki	Keizō Shimizu, Shi Jie Zhu & Reika Hoshino	June 22, 2024
13	"Ravens Shouldn't Wear Kimono"; Transliteration: "Karasu ni Hitoe wa Niawanai" (Japanese: 烏(からす) に 単(ひとえ)は似合わない)	Naoki Kotani	Momoko Nagakawa, Shi Jie Zhu & Hiroaki Imaki	June 29, 2024
14	"The Taboo Elixir"; Transliteration: "Kindan no Kusuri" (Japanese: 禁断(きんだん)の薬(くすり))	Toshiyuki Kato	Minoru Murao, Yūji Kondō, Tomoyuki Matsumoto, Yoshiaki Tsubata & Reika Hoshino	July 20, 2024
15	"The Girl Who Lived"; Transliteration: "Ikinokotta Shōjo" (Japanese: 生き残った少女)	Shigenori Kageyama	Keizō Shimizu, Momoko Nagakawa, Yūji Kondō, Tomoyuki Matsumoto & Hiroaki Imaki	August 17, 2024
16	"Wisteria Arrows"; Transliteration: "Fuji no Ya" (Japanese: 藤の矢)	Naoki Kotani	Momoko Nagakawa, Minoru Murao & Reika Hoshino	August 24, 2024
17	"King of the Underground"; Transliteration: "Chikagai no O" (Japanese: 地下街の王)	Shinya Kawatsura	Momoko Nagakawa, Keizō Shimizu, Shi Jie Zhu, Yoshiaki Tsubata & Hiroaki Imaki	August 31, 2024
18	"The World Outside"; Transliteration: "Gaikai" (Japanese: 外界)	Kaoru Suzuki	Momoko Nagakawa, Minoru Murao & Reika Hoshino	September 7, 2024
19	"A Well Run Dry"; Transliteration: "Kare Ido" (Japanese: 涸(か)れ井戸)	Kageyama Hiromin	Murao Minoru, Keizo Shimizu, Shi Jie Zhu, Yoshiaki Tsubata & Hiroaki Imaki	September 14, 2024
20	"The Golden Raven"; Transliteration: "Kin no Karasu" (Japanese: 黄金の烏)	Yoshiaki Kyogoku	Momoko Nagakawa, Minoru Murao, Keizo Shimizu, Shi Jie Zhu & Reika Hoshino	September 21, 2024
