= You're Being Summoned, Azazel =

Japanese manga series

- Cover of the first manga volume

よんでますよ、アザゼルさん。 (Yondemasuyo, Azazeru-san)
- Genre: Dark comedy; Supernatural
- Manga
- Written by: Yasuhisa Kubo
- Published by: Kodansha
- Magazine: Evening
- Original run: October 5, 2007 – December 11, 2018
- Volumes: 16
- Original video animation
- Directed by: Tsutomu Mizushima
- Music by: Ryuji Takagi
- Studio: Production I.G
- Released: February 23, 2010 – June 23, 2014
- Runtime: 11–27 minutes
- Episodes: 4
- Anime television series
- Directed by: Tsutomu Mizushima
- Music by: Ryuji Takagi
- Studio: Production I.G
- Licensed by: NA: Nozomi Entertainment
- Original network: AT-X, BS11, Chiba TV, MBS, Tokyo MX, TV Aichi, tvk, TV Saitama, TVQ
- Original run: April 8, 2011 – July 1, 2011
- Episodes: 13
- Anime television series

You're Being Summoned, Azazel Z
- Directed by: Tsutomu Mizushima
- Music by: Ryuji Takagi
- Studio: Production I.G
- Licensed by: NA: Nozomi Entertainment
- Original network: AT-X, BS11, Chiba TV, MBS, Tokyo MX, TV Aichi, tvk, TV Saitama, TVQ
- Original run: April 7, 2013 – June 30, 2013
- Episodes: 13
- icon

You're Being Summoned, Azazel (Japanese: よんでますよ、アザゼルさん。, Hepburn: Yondemasuyo, Azazeru-san) is a Japanese comedy manga series written and illustrated by Yasuhisa Kubo. It was serialized in Kodansha's seinen manga magazine Evening from October 2007 to December 2018, with its chapters collected in sixteen tankōbon volumes.

Four original animation DVDs (OADs) were released between 2010 and 2014. A 13-episode anime adaptation by Production I.G aired in Japan between April and July 2011. A second season, titled You're Being Summoned, Azazel Z, aired from April to June 2013. In North America, the series is licensed by Nozomi Entertainment, who released both seasons on DVD in February 2015. Funimation began streaming the series on their website in partnership with Nozomi Entertainment in May 2021.

== Characters ==
Azazel (アザゼル, Azazeru)
Voiced by: Masaya Onosaka
A dog-like demon. He is a pervert who gets never-ending enjoyment in sexually harassing others, especially Sakuma. He is also deathly afraid of Akutabe, who tends to abuse him when he gets out of line or fails to accomplish a goal. His ability is called Lewdness, which gives him the ability to incite lust. His powers range from making people attractive, unattractive, and even cause impotence. When Akutabe ended their contract, he became contracted with Sakuma much to her chagrin.
He represents 'Lust' of the seven deadly sins.
Rinko Sakuma (佐隈 りん子, Sakuma Rinko)
Voiced by: Rina Satō
Rinko Sakuma is the young female assistant of Akutabe. Young and naive, she is just starting to learn about the power of demons. She is bound in a contract with Azazel. She appears to be one of the more moral people in the series early on, but as she learns more about demons, she becomes considerably darker. Many of the demons note she is becoming more like Akutabe. She is also easily influenced by money. Azazel's nickname for her is Saku-chan (サクちゃん).
Akutabe (芥辺)
Voiced by: Daisuke Namikawa
Akutabe is a detective that specializes in using demons. He is very knowledgeable in the occult, and uses this knowledge to overpower the demons, even enabling him to block a powered up Divulgence spell from Beelzebub. He is Sakuma's employer as well as a mentor. He will summon demons to do his bidding and will often mistreat them if they annoy him or mess up their assignments. His reputation for cruelty has caused even demons to fear him.
Beelzebub (ベルゼブブ, Beruzebubu)
Voiced by: Hiroshi Kamiya
A childhood friend of Azazel who is a part of an elite family of demons. Despite appearing to be a bird, he is actually a fly demon who eats feces much to the disgust of those around him. He also has an ability called Divulgence which gives him the power to make others reveal their hidden selves ranging from revealing the side of them they do not want people to see, to forced defecation. He can also use goat dung as a doping drug, making his attacks considerably more powerful. Azazel's nickname for him is Bēyan (べーやん).
He represents 'Gluttony' of the seven deadly sins.
Salamander (サラマンダー, Saramandā)
Voiced by: Kazuya Nakai
Salamander is a red lizard like demon who was originally summoned by an amateur for personal, selfish reasons. Because the summoner was uneducated, Salamander dominated his spirit. Salamander has an ability called Revolution which makes people believe their own words when they say things they do not truly believe. He always carries a Katana that is strapped to his waist. Azazel's nickname for him is Manda-han (マンダはん).
He represents 'Greed' of the seven deadly sins.
Undine (アンダイン, Andain)
Voiced by: Yū Kobayashi
Undine is a mermaid demon, with the ability to take on human form. She has fallen in love with Akutabe much to his chagrin. Her ability is Jealousy, which makes it so that whenever she is jealous of another woman for whatever reason, she is able to transform that woman with her will. When she is happy, these curses are undone.
She represents 'Envy' of the seven deadly sins.
Moloch (モロク, Moroku)
Voiced by: Tesshō Genda
A bull like demon under Akutabe's control. According to Azazel and Beelzebub, he is the most violent demon in Hell and both are evidently scared of him, especially when he is angered. Akutabe praises him as a demon on a higher league than his other demons and explained that he has the ability called Violence though what it does is unknown. He was apparently killed when Sariel took his grimoire to heaven. His nickname is Mossan (モッさん).
He represents 'Wrath' of the seven deadly sins.
In Season 2, a new Moloch appears, more known as Mossan II (モッさん二世, Mossan Ni-sei). Mossan II is the younger brother of Moloch and has a worse temper than Moloch.
Kōtarō Dōchin (堂珍 光太郎, Dōchin Kōtarō)
Voiced by: Ryōko Shiraishi
A boy who is the grandson of an acquaintance of Akutabe. His overall personality is parallel to Azazel, albeit angrier and verbally abusive. Examples of this includes sexually harassing Sakuma on their first meeting and picks a fight with Azazel. He is contracted with Gusion.
Gusion (グシオン, Gushion)
Voiced by: Noboru Yamaguchi
A winged monkey-like demon who was one of Solomon's 72 demons. He is contracted with Kōtarō whom the later sacrificed the memories of his grandfather to form a contract with him. His special ability is called Forgetfulness. This ability allows him to eat the memories of others, especially fond memories.
He represents 'Sloth' of the seven deadly sins.
Sariel (サリエル, Sarieru)
Voiced by: Takeshi Kusao
An angel sent to collect grimoires of demons. Due to a strict law imposed on angels, he cannot help mortals in need despite his righteous nature and can only act as an observer. Also of note is that they cannot help even themselves if a human is the one tormenting them. The only time angels are permitted to help humans is if a demon is involved, in which case they will take its grimoire back to heaven. He steals Moloch's grimoire and takes it to heaven, killing the latter in the process.
Zeruel (ゼルエル, Zerueru)
Voiced by: Keiji Fujiwara
Another angel sent to collect grimoires. Like Sariel, he is a hypocrite as an angel, spending years climbing mountains and watching porn, waiting till the last minute to do his duties. He tried to steal Beelzebub's grimoire, but failed and became a fallen angel.
Kiyoko (キヨコ)
Voiced by: Rie Kugimiya
A pink dog-like demon similar in style to Azazel, she is an occasional lover of his that believes that the two of them are married due to their physical relationship.

== Media ==
=== Manga ===
Yondemasuyo, Azazel-san is written and illustrated by Yasuhisa Kubo. The manga was serialized in Kodansha's seinen manga magazine Evening from October 5, 2007, to December 11, 2018. Kodansha collected its chapters in sixteen tankōbon volumes, released from April 23, 2008, to February 22, 2019. A special chapter was published in the final issue of Evening on February 28, 2023.

==== Volumes ====
No.	Japanese release date	Japanese ISBN
1	April 23, 2008	978-4-06-352222-8
2	October 23, 2008	978-4-06-352240-2
3	April 23, 2009	978-4-06-352263-1
4	February 23, 2010	978-4-06-352299-0; 978-4-06-358324-3 (LE)
5	September 22, 2010; September 19, 2010 (LE)	978-4-06-352324-9; 978-4-06-358324-3 (LE)
6	March 23, 2011	978-4-06-352357-7
7	November 22, 2011	978-4-06-352385-0
8	May 23, 2012	978-4-06-352416-1
9	March 22, 2013; March 19, 2013 (LE)	978-4-06-352452-9; 978-4-06-358434-9 (LE)
10	October 23, 2013	978-4-06-352471-0
11	June 23, 2014; June 21, 2014 (LE)	978-4-06-354520-3; 978-4-06-358472-1 (LE)
12	July 23, 2015	978-4-06-354567-8; 978-4-06-358771-5 (LE)
13	April 22, 2015	978-4-06-354612-5
14	July 21, 2017	978-4-06-354647-7
15	April 23, 2018	978-4-06-511255-7
16	February 22, 2019	978-4-06-514496-1

=== Original animation DVD ===
An original animation DVD (OAD) was bundled with the limited edition of the manga's fourth volume on February 23, 2010 and another episode with the limited edition of the fifth volume on September 22, 2010. A third OAD was bundled with the limited edition of the manga's eighth volume on May 23, 2012. A fourth OAD was bundled with the limited edition of the manga's eleventh volume on June 23, 2014.

No.	Title	Release date
1	"Naki-ushi-hen" (泣き牛編)	February 23, 2010
The demon Azazel is summoned by Rinko Sakuma as a practice for demon summoning by her employer, Demon Detective Akutabe. Refusing to go back without having a task given to him, Rinko allows Azazel to wash the windows. She later tries to summon Beelzebub, but summons Moloch instead. Moloch is at first shocked by his shrunken state, but Azazel explains that there is an Anti-Demon barrier that reduces their power dramatically and turns them into small, cute, weakened animals. When Moloch demands a tribute for being summoned, Rinko presents him with curry. Insulted by the tribute, he begins to punish Rinko by turning her into a cow. Luckily, Akutabe arrives and makes Moloch accept the tribute by having him eat it, turning Rinko back to normal. When he is shocked to find it is beef curry, he returns to Hell crying with Azazel trying to comfort him. Akutabe then scolds Rinko for her carelessness and warns her to be more careful when dealing with demons.
2	"Sēya-hen" (セーヤ編)	September 22, 2010
This takes place sometime after episode 4 of the series. Azazel is worries Rinko will become another Akutabe after he discovers she has been getting increasingly good at using magic. Later, a client asks Rinko to help her break up with her idiotic host club boyfriend, Seiya. At the club, Seiya stated when he becomes number one host, he will agree to break up with his girlfriend. Not seeing it happening, Rinko uses Azazel's ability to make him irresistible to women and become number one host. Azazel soon realizes because of the guy's stupidity, he could use him to leave the agency. The next day, Azazel tricks Seiya to steal his grimoire from the agency. With Akutabe gone on a three-day case on the other side of the world, Rinko is forced to rely on Beelzebub for help. He explains that since the grimoire was stolen, she has two days to get it back or she will be cursed by the grimoire and her ties with demons will be severed. He at first is unwilling to help until Rinko points out that if their contract is terminated, he'll have to go back to working with Akutabe who treats him far worst. They find Seiya and Azazel at a club seducing women and gaining power thanks to Azazel's ability of inciting lust. Rinko tries to convince Seiya to giver her back her grimoire, even showing him Okada who was turned into an iguana for abusing the power of the grimoire. Unfortunately, Seiya is too incompetent to understand the severity of his situation. They try to use force but are captured. As Azazel and Seiya celebrate their success, the latter goes to defecate, but does not have toilet paper, so he uses a page of the grimoire. For desecrating the grimoire, he is turned into a praying mantis leaving Azazel unable to use his powers. Rinko soon gets free and once again has Azazel's grimoire back. She then punishes Azazel with a curse that causes him to explode, much to the horror of Beelzebub who realizes she is slowly becoming like Akutabe.
3	"Lucifer-hen" (ルシファー編)	May 23, 2012
Akutabe declares that they will be moving due to the Angels finding their office, asking Rinko to use Azazel and Beelzebub for assistance. Beelzebub is within his mansion when he receives an email from her. Lucifer then bursts in and asks about his injuries, and Beelzebub curtly dismisses him. In reply, Lucifer insults Beelzebub, which ends up being a titanic fight in Hell. A summoning circle appears above them, and Lucifer is dragged along with Beelzebub. Azazel fawns over Lucifer, who is now a koala. Lucifer demands a sacrifice of "leaves", and Rinko gets him some grass from the park. Rinko then orders the demons to help in moving. However, Azazel decides to rebel against Rinko alongside Lucifer when suddenly, Akutabe appears. Akutabe tries to force Lucifer into a contract but Lucifer has a rich patron: Tomiko Senba, a hugely successful CEO. Azazel and Beelzebub team up to fight Lucifer alongside Akutabe. Beelzebub dislocates Lucifer's arm, revealing a cellphone. Tomiko is in the midst of intense negotiations when she gets a text from Lucifer summon him. She hastily rushes out of the conference room, sending her employees flying. A summoning circle appears above Lucifer and he manages to escape. Akutabe finds out that the cellphone data has been erased and angrily swears to enslave Lucifer one day. Lucifer is berated by Tomiko, calling him a "filthy animal". Lucifer explains it as a side-effect but Tomiko continues insulting him. Lucifer undoes his spell of everlasting youth, aggressively aging Tomiko and revealing her to be a desiccated husk. She grovels before him to restore her looks. Lucifer swears that he will definitely kill Akutabe for his humiliation as he chews on the marijuana.
4	"Isoginchaku-hen" (ルシファー編)	June 23, 2014

=== Anime ===
A 13-episode anime television series adaptation by Production I.G. was broadcast on Tokyo MX and other networks from April 8 to July 1, 2011. The opening song is "Pandemic!!" by Chihiro Yonekura, and the ending song is "Like a Party" by Team Nekokan ft. Chihiro Yonekura.

A second 13-episode season, titled You're Being Summoned, Azazel Z (よんでますよ、アザゼルさん。Z, Yondemasuyo, Azazeru-san Z), was broadcast from April 7 to June 30, 2013. For the Second season, the opening song is "Momomomomossan's Theme" (もももももっさんのテーマ, Momomomomossan no Tēma) by Daisuke Namikawa for the first episode, and the opening song for the rest of the season is, "Revival!!" (りばいばる!!, Ribaibaru) by Team Nekokan ft. Chihiro Yonekura.

In North America, Nozomi Entertainment released both series' seasons on DVD on February 3, 2015. Funimation began streaming the series on their website in partnership with Nozomi Entertainment on May 1, 2021.

==== You're Being Summoned, Azazel ====
No.	Title	Original release date
1	"The Demon Detective, the Demon and the Part-time Worker" "Tōjō! Akuma-tantei to Akuma to Baito" (登場!悪魔探偵と悪魔とバイト)	April 8, 2011
After finding out her husband was cheating on her, a client seeks the help of demon detective Akutabe and his new assistant Rinko Sakuma to make him stop. Akutabe summons Azazel, the demon of lust, for the task. However, Azazel proves to be useless, using his powers upon their client instead, first giving her an overwhelming stench, and then giving her enormous breasts. To encourage Azazel, Akutabe entices him by promising to cancel their contract if he succeeds. He finally does it by making the cheater impotent from a suggestion made by Sakuma, much to her horror. In the end, Akutabe does keep his promise, but then forces a contract between Sakuma and Azazel instead.
2	"Prince of the Demon World" "Makai no Purinsu" (魔界のプリンス)	April 15, 2011
For attendance credits at her college, Sakuma agrees to find a dog named Toki for her teacher, a famous vegetarian and animal rights activist with supposedly no faults. Akutabe enlists the help of Azazel's childhood friend Beelzebub, who is a prince of Hell. Under Sakuma's guidance, they succeed in the task and capture Toki thanks to Beelzebub forcing the dog to defecate with his special ability. Back at the office, Beelzebub is praised by Sakuma causing Azazel to feel jealous. Sakuma gives him a pig's foot to cheer him up but he is then attacked by Toki. Beelzebub in the meantime was prepared to use the office microwave to warm up the dog feces from earlier to eat, but is violently stopped by Akutabe. Akutabe later then concludes from looking at Toki's feces that the professor was forcing a vegetarian diet on Toki. He later publicly exposes this fact on a live television show using Beelzebub's Divulgence ability, causing the professor to go into hiding, and giving Toki to a loving family.
3	"Revolution of men" "Otokotachi no Kakumei" (漢達の革命)	April 22, 2011
A man named Okada seeks the agency's help to find an idol named Hebi-chan whom he has been stalking. He plans on using the power of a demon he summoned called Salamander to get her to love him. Salamander's power is revealed to be Revolution, where he uses people's own words to influence their thoughts and behaviour. He uses his powers on Sakuma, making her see Azazel as a handsome, kind person, and makes her agree to help the stalker. Azazel and Beelzebub are impressed by Salamander's powers and agree to assist him. At the same time, Akutabe takes on a job on behalf of Hebi-chan to capture her stalker. When Akutabe returns to the office, he discovers what has transpired and concluded from the way things are that Salamander completely took over Okada's will due to lack of experience. He is immediately betrayed by his demons and Sakuma, who is under Salamander's influence, and Okada is allowed to escape. After a little research he comes up with a plan and forms a contract with Undine, a neurotic, unstable demon of jealousy with the power of Transformation. She falls for Akutabe, much to his annoyance and anger.
4	"Jealous Fish" "Yaki-zakana" (妬き魚)	April 29, 2011
Salamander and his followers come up with a plan by using Sakuma to get close to the Hebi-chan, allowing Salamander to use his powers on her. Sakuma returns to the agency, prompting Undine to have an extreme fit of jealousy, accusing her of trying to steal away Akutabe with her "four-eyed" beauty. She then activates her power, giving Sakuma perfect vision and taking her glasses. Later, Akutabe takes Sakuma and Undine to meet with Hebi-chan. While Sakuma calls for the demons, Akutabe praises Hebi-chan's beauty, enraging Undine again. When Okada and the demons arrive, they discover that Hebi-chan has been turned into a hideous person by Undine, disgusting Okada and allowing Akutabe to capture the demons. He then makes Undine happy to undo what was done as a result of her jealousy, turning Hebi-chan back to normal and restoring Sakuma's short-sightedness. He then cryptically tells Okada that as a result of his actions, he will soon be punished by the grimoire. At the office Sakuma, now no longer influenced by Salamander, asks what will happen to Okada, but Akutabe simply warns her to be aware that she should be careful when dealing with demons. Akutabe then proceeds to violently punish Azazel and Beelzebub for their treachery along with Salamander.
5	"Love ☆ Curry Doctor" "Ai Karē-haku" (哀☆カレー博)	May 6, 2011
Akutabe reveals to Sakuma that Okada was turned into an iguana as punishment for his actions and prompts her to study the grimoire. Later, Sakuma shows promise in using the powers of the grimoire when she uses Beelzebub to stop a molester on a subway. Little does she know, the angel Sariel is tracking her down to take her grimoire. Sakuma later meets with a client to solve a case where a company's mascot has been plagiarized by another company. Tasked to find out who it is, she decides Beelzebub to expose the culprit, but it fails. She asks for Akutabe's help and he lends her Moloch, reputed to be one of the most violent demons in Hell. Later at a bar, her client meets with her and reprimands her for not finding the culprit yet, but is later put to shame when they find out he was the one who leaked the mascot's image in a drunken stupor. Despite this, he refuses to pay Sakuma, and she uses Beelzebub to cause him to want to defecate until he agrees to pay. Meanwhile, Sariel is getting close to Sakuma and the demons.
6	"Moloch of Violence" "Bōgyaku no Moroku" (暴虐のモロク)	May 13, 2011
While hunting down the source of the demonic power, Sariel is waylaid and forced into the same bar where Sakuma, the demons and the client are drinking. Sakuma continues to extort the client for their fee, while Azazel is angry that she is using Beelzebub's powers more than his. Beelzebub points out to Sakuma that they should send back Moloch, who is on the edge because he has no outlet to use his powers. The client accidentally angers Moloch by spitting out some beef jerky, but before an enraged Moloch can attack him, the client mistakes Moloch for a soft toy. In the confusion, Moloch's grimoire falls into Sariel's hands, and the angel reveals himself and flies up to heaven with the book, to the horror of the demons. As his grimoire reaches heaven, Moloch then disappears forever, and a tearful Azazel and Beelzebub weep for his loss. Sakuma is touched by the emotions displayed by the demons. The next day, Sakuma returns to work and is overjoyed to see Moloch in the office. But it turns out to be a stuffed toy created by their former client, which is then gleefully destroyed by Azazel and Beelzebub.
7	"Return of the Jealous Fish" "Yaki-zakana, Futatabi" (妬き魚、再び)	May 20, 2011
Sakuma is introduced to Koutarou Douchin, a young boy contracted with Gusion, a monkey-like demon who eats the memories of others. Akutabe asks her to take him to school, but she is disgusted by Douchin's bad attitude and sexual harassment. Akutabe is forced to call upon the increasingly unstable Undine, who is revealed to be desperate for a husband. Undine takes Douchin to his school, Golgotha High, where she meets and falls for Himoi, Douchin's new homeroom teacher. She then tricks the handsome but stupid teacher into signing a contract and to say that he loves her. When Douchin accidentally breaks a vase in the principal's room, he calls upon Gusion to eat the memories of Himoi and the principal to cover his actions.
8	"Himo-T" "Himotisu" (ヒモティス)	May 27, 2011
Douchin is brought to his new class, and Undine follows him there to remain close to Himoi, who is revealed to be an extremely popular teacher, especially among the girls. After several instances where Undine uses her powers to deflect girls away from Himoi, she confronts him. Himoi blurts out that he prefers the peaceful life of the school over her, and Undine transforms the place into a dystopian, tortuous environment. Douchin tries to ask for help from the agency, but everyone refuses. Back at the school, Undine discovers that Himoi does not remember saying he loves her, and turns him into a fish. Douchin returns and realises that everything happened because he used Gusion's powers to erase Himoi's memories. He then makes Undine happy to undo her powers and makes Gusion eat everyone's memories to cover his tracks. Back at the agency, a happy Undine tries to force her renewed affections on an enraged Akutabe.
9	"Strawberry Warrior Appears, nyorin www" "Ichigo no Senshi Tōjō Nyorin www" (苺の戦士 登場ニョリンwww)	June 3, 2011
Sakuma begins getting off work from the agency earlier each day, causing Akutabe to have suspicions. Azazel and Beelzebub volunteer to spy on her, and Akutabe releases some of the barriers he has placed upon Beelzebub to help them blend in the human world. Beelzebub adopts a human form, and Azazel puts on a dog suit. They track Sakuma to the university where it is revealed that she is cosplaying as the anime character Strawberry Warrior, in order to get exam notes from the anime club president. Despite her inhibitions, she proves to be adept at playing the character, and eventually joins more of the anime club activities. Azazel and Beelzebub inform Akutabe, who tells them to get her back.
10	"Serve the Strawberry Curry!" "Ichigo no Karē o Meshiagare!" (イチゴのカレーを召しあがれ!)	June 10, 2011
11	"Alpinist Angel" "Arupinisuto Enjeru" (アルピニストエンジェル)	June 17, 2011
12	"Dirty Landlord Good Landlord" "Kitanai Ōya Yoi Ōya" (汚い大家 善い大家)	June 24, 2011
13	"Bee" "Bēyan" (べーやん)	July 1, 2011

==== You're Being Summoned, Azazel Z ====
No.	Title	Original release date
1	"Foolish Older Brother, Clever Younger" "Gunii Kenotouto" (愚兄賢弟)	April 7, 2013
2	"The Cow Saw!" "Ushi wa Mita!" (牛は見た！)	April 14, 2013
3	"Charisma of Hemorrhoids" "Ji no Karisuma" (痔のカリスマ)	April 21, 2013
4	"Eurynomos of Despair" "Zetsubou no Eurinoumu" (絶望のエウリノーム)	April 28, 2013
5	"Megumi on the Move" "Megumi, Ugoku" (恵、動く)	May 5, 2013
6	"Pure Angel, Baby!" "Juntenshi, Beibii" (純天使、ベイビイ)	May 12, 2013
7	"Murder at Lake Ryuujin (Part 1)" "Ruujinko Satsujin Jiken (Zenpen)" (龍神湖殺人事件（前編）)	May 19, 2013
8	"Murder at Lake Ryuujin (Part 2)" "Ruujinko Satsujin Jiken (Kouhen)" (龍神湖殺人事件（後編）)	May 26, 2013
9	"Welcome to the Museum" "Hakubutsukan e Youkoso" (博物館へようこそ)	June 2, 2013
10	"The End of Son"	June 9, 2013
11	"The Truth About Acchan" "Acchan no genjitsu" (あっちゃんの現実)	June 16, 2013
12	"Demon" "Akuma" (あくま)	June 23, 2013
13	"Darkness" "Yami" (やみ)	June 30, 2013
