= Raw Hero =

Japanese manga series

- First tankōbon volume cover
- Genre: Adventure; Comedy
- Manga
- Written by: Akira Hiramoto
- Published by: Kodansha
- English publisher: NA: Yen Press
- Magazine: Evening
- Original run: September 25, 2018 – August 11, 2020
- Volumes: 6
- icon

Raw Hero (stylized as RaW HERO) is a Japanese manga series written and illustrated by Akira Hiramoto. It was serialized in Kodansha's Evening from September 2018 to August 2020, with its chapters collected in six tankōbon volumes. In North America, the manga is licensed for English release by Yen Press.

== Plot ==
Chiaki is an unemployed young adult desperately job hunting to support his two brothers. On the way to an interview he stops a man from groping a woman. The assault was actually a consensual role-play by a government agent named Tadano who offers Chiaki a job with the Justice Management Team (JMT). The agency combats super-powered villians with an ultimate goal to dismantle the criminal organization Special Abilities Liberation Front (SALF). Desperate for cash, Chiaki accepts the job and is tasked with becoming a double-agent in SALF. Chiaki enters a SALF recruitment event where he mistakenly cross-dresses when he grabs a suitcase that was intended for one of Tadano's role-play sessions. The leaders of SALF take pity on Chiaki and let him join as a foot soldier in a low-level operations team with the cowardly Ryuu Hoshi, a man named Cobain who does not speak Japanese, and their dog Possan.

== Publication ==
Written and illustrated by Akira Hiramoto, Raw Hero was serialized in Kodansha's Evening from September 25, 2018, to August 11, 2020. Kodansha collected its chapters in six tankōbon volumes, released from February 22, 2019, to September 23, 2020.

In North America, the series is licensed for English release by Yen Press.

=== Volumes ===
No.	Original release date	Original ISBN	English release date	English ISBN
1	February 22, 2019	978-4-06-514552-4	February 25, 2020	978-1-97-539924-5
2	June 21, 2019	978-4-06-516076-3	July 21, 2020	978-1-97-531284-8
3	September 19, 2019	978-4-06-517257-5	October 20, 2020	978-1-97-531459-0
4	January 23, 2020	978-4-06-518282-6	April 20, 2021	978-1-97-532338-7
5	May 22, 2020	978-4-06-519584-0	July 27, 2021	978-1-97-532429-2
6	September 23, 2020	978-4-06-520715-4	February 22, 2022	978-1-97-533568-7
