= Eden: It's an Endless World! =

Japanese manga series

- Seventh tankōbon volume cover, featuring Elijah Ballard; each volume uses its own font and styling
- Genre: Cyberpunk; Political thriller; Post-apocalyptic
- Manga
- Written by: Hiroki Endo
- Published by: Kodansha
- English publisher: NA: Dark Horse Comics
- Imprint: Afternoon KC
- Magazine: Monthly Afternoon
- Original run: September 25, 1997 – June 25, 2008
- Volumes: 18
- icon

Eden: It's an Endless World!, also known simply as Eden (stylized in all caps), is a Japanese manga series written and illustrated by Hiroki Endo. It was serialized in Kodansha's seinen manga magazine Monthly Afternoon from September 1997 to June 2008, with its chapters collected in 18 tankōbon volumes.

== Premise ==
The story is set in the near future, following the "closure virus" pandemic has killed 15 percent of the world's population, crippled or disfigured many more, with catastrophic effect on global politics. Its themes and many character names are taken from Gnostic mythology.

== Plot ==
Elijah and Cherubim gaze at the city in this early page from the manga. Endo has been noted for the amount of detail he puts into his work.

The series begins with a long introduction, with the characters Ennoia and Hannah living a peaceful life on a remote and isolated island called Eden, with researcher Lane Morris, who is their guardian and a victim of the pandemic. The events that led to this situation are revealed in flashbacks, leading up to the return of Ennoia's father, along with the forces of the Propater Federation.

Following this, the story moves forwards twenty years, and focuses on Ennoia's son, Elijah, the main character, and his own conflict with the powerful and monopolistic Propater federation to save his sister, Mana Ballard, kidnapped by Propater when he was very young. She is being held to threaten Ennoia Ballard, father of the two characters, who has become a powerful drug lord in South America, feared and despised by many, including, to an extent, his own family. During a terrorist attack, Elijah, aged 15, is separated from his mother and his sister is kidnapped, along with his mother Hannah and now has to handle things on his own. Eden is about his coming-of-age as a man and trying to survive both bodily and morally in world that is too complex for mere "black and white". He encounters many other characters, both allies and enemies, all sharing the same struggle to survive in a post-apocalyptic dystopian world.

Many stories are included of the people Elijah meets, telling their past or following life, sometimes volumes later, furthering understanding of the characters and giving increased depth to the world of the book as a whole.

Later in the series, the story once again moves forwards in time, jumping four more years ahead. The Closure Virus, the cause of the original pandemic, mutates, this time assimilating non-organic matter as well as organic, known as "colloid" (or "Disclosure Virus"). The story rejoins Elijah, now 19 years old, as well as many other old characters, and some new, as the world begins to deal with this new threat that is swallowing many cities in the world, leaving lakes and craters, and many people. It is later discovered that the several colloids in the world, are linked with a net of underground auto-built "cables", and that the colloid itself, stores all the memories of the people it swallows.

== Characters ==
Elijah Ballard (エリヤ・バラード, Eriya Barādo)
Elijah is introduced while on the run from Propater. He encounters some mercenaries also eluding Propater and is forced to join them. During his flight he is forced to become a hardened killer. After returning to Peru, Elijah becomes involved in his father's criminal activities, and undergoes a coming of age into adulthood.
Ennoia Ballard (エンノイア・バラード, Ennoia Barādo)
Elijah's father, raised on Eden. After he and Hannah left there, Ennoia became the most powerful drug lord in South America, and a staunch opponent of the Propater Federation.
Hannah Mayall (ハナ・メイオール, Hana Meiōru)
Elijah's mother, raised on Eden. She and Elijah's sister were captured by the Propater while trying to leave Ennoia with Elijah. A major focus of the series is Elijah's quest to rescue Hannah and Mana.
Mana Ballard (マナ・バラード, Mana Barādo)
Elijah's sister, who remains in Propater hands whilst her mother is rescued. Elijah's fight to free her is a focus of the later parts of the story.
Nazarbaiev Khan (ナザルバイエフ・カーン, Nazarubaiefu Kān)
Colonel Khan is an old soldier from Azerbaijan. He leads the Nomad group (including Kenji and Sophia) fleeing Propater at the start of the series. Khan became Kenji's mentor after killing his brother, and the two share a slightly strained, but trusting, relationship.
Sophia Theódores (ソフィア・テオドレス, Sofia Teodoresu)
A powerful Greek computer hacker, and full-body cyborg. Despite her youthful appearance, she is much older. Sophia acts as a mother figure to many characters in the series, most notably Kenji, although her relationship with him is somewhat more complicated. Sophia was very promiscuous in her youth, and had eight children. Her first, Andreas, whom she tried to kill, and who still bears the scars, is a high-ranking member of Nomad. Sophia later helps to activate Maya.
Maya (マーヤ, Māya)
A nearly godlike AI, which seems to roughly correspond to the savior of Gnostic mythology. He has the ability to connect human and colloid. Has the appearance of an androgynous, dark-skinned boy.
Kenji Asai (ケンジ・アサイ)
The brother of a low-level yakuza boss. Kenji is extremely skilled at hand-to-hand combat, being able to take down countless enemies using only his signature knife. While he initially appears to be a sociopath, killing both soldiers and non-combatants without any signs of remorse, flashbacks show him to be a psychologically complex character driven by basic human needs such as love and understanding.
Cherubim (ケルビム, Kerubimu)
A sophisticated robot built to protect the research facility on Eden, who was instead later used to destroy it. Cherubim later serves as Elijah's protector, and is a powerful combatant in his conflicts with Propater. However, Cherubim is not always able to distinguish friend from foe, and often causes collateral damage. Cherubim is named after Cherub.
Helena Montoya (ヘレナ・モントーヤ, Herena Montōya)
A prostitute now working in a brothel. Has a complex relationship with Elijah and acts as a surrogate big sister. She was forced to help the Colonel's mercenary group while on the run from Propater in exchange for her freedom.

== Media ==
=== Manga ===
Eden: It's an Endless World! was written and illustrated by Hiroki Endo. The series ran in Kodansha's seinen manga magazine Monthly Afternoon from September 25, 1997, (Note: Debuted in the magazine's November 1997 issue, released on September 25, 1997.) to June 25, 2008. (Note: Finished in the magazine's August 2008 issue, released on June 25, 2008.) Kodansha collected its chapters into 18 tankōbon volumes, released from April 23, 1998, to July 23, 2008.

In July 2005, Dark Horse Comics announced in San Diego Comic-Con that it has licensed Eden for North American distribution, with publication to begin in November of that year. By March 2014, 14 volumes were released in total.

==== Volumes ====
| No. | Original release date | Original ISBN | English release date | English ISBN |
|---|---|---|---|---|
| 1 | April 23, 1998 | 978-4-06-314176-4 | November 2, 2005 | 978-1-59307-406-7 |
1. "Prologue" (プロローグ); 2. "Twenty Years Later" (20 years later); 3. "Cruel World, Cruel Me" (残酷な世界 残酷な僕); 4. "Emotions" (感情); Bonus Story: "Day Dream"
| 2 | October 22, 1998 | 978-4-06-314191-7 | February 1, 2006 | 978-1-59307-454-8 |
5. "Fragment of the World" (世界のカケラ); 6. "Today, Tomorrow, Someday"; 7. "Powerless" (どうにもならない事); 8. "Hostages" (人質); 9. "Substitution"; 10. "Disruption" (攪乱); 11. "Rush"
| 3 | May 21, 1999 | 978-4-06-314208-2 | May 3, 2006 | 978-1-59307-529-3 |
12. "Overload"; 13. "High Noon"; 14. "Let Down"; 15. "Up Tight"; 16. "I'm Making a Mistake (Beginning)" (僕は間違っていく (前編)); 17. "I'm Making a Mistake (Middle)" (僕は間違っていく (中編)); 18. "I'm Making a Mistake (End)" (僕は間違っていく (後編))
| 4 | February 23, 2000 | 978-4-06-314233-4 | August 2, 2006 | 978-1-59307-544-6 |
19. "We're Never Wrong" (僕ら何もまちがってない); 20. "Artisan"; 21. "Truly Filthy Things" (本当にきたないもの); 22. "Just the Two of Us" (ふたりぼっち); 23. "Choker"; 24. "Never Enough"; Bonus Story: "Fig Trees" (無花果)
| 5 | July 21, 2000 | 978-4-06-314246-4 | November 1, 2006 | 978-1-59307-634-4 |
25. "Pretty Hate Machine (Beginning)" (Pretty Hate Machine (前編)); 26. "Pretty Hate Machine (End)" (Pretty Hate Machine (後編)); 27. "August Son" (八月の息子); 28. "Deceive"; 29. "Panic (Beginning)" (Panic (前編)); 30. "Panic (Middle)" (Panic (中編)); 31. "Panic (End)" (Panic (後編))
| 6 | September 21, 2001 | 978-4-06-314274-7 | February 7, 2007 | 978-1-59307-702-0 |
32. "Aftercare" (アフター・ケア); 33. "Punishment"; 34. "Nursery Crime"; 35. "Declaration of War" (宣戦布告); 36. "Mind Confusion"; 37. "Trip On"; 38. "Murderous Intent"; 39. "Killing Search"
| 7 | May 23, 2002 | 978-4-06-314294-5 | May 2, 2007 | 978-1-59307-765-5 |
40. "Automater"; 41. "Red Sweet Pea (Beginning)" (赤いスイートピー (前編)); 42. "Red Sweet Pea (Middle)" (赤いスイートピー (中編)); 43. "Red Sweet Pea (End)" (赤いスイートピー (後編)); 44. "Bats, a Mother, Bait" (こうもり 母親 撒き餌); 45. "Acceleration"; 46. "When Being Good Stops Working" (きれい事じゃもうおっつかねえ)
| 8 | February 21, 2003 | 978-4-06-314307-2 | August 1, 2007 | 978-1-59307-787-7 |
47. "The Day the Mummy Thief Became a Mummy (Beginning)" (ミイラ取りがミイラになる日 (前編)); 48. "The Day the Mummy Thief Became a Mummy (Middle)" (ミイラ取りがミイラになる日 (中編)); 49. "The Day the Mummy Thief Became a Mummy (End)" (ミイラ取りがミイラになる日 (後編)); 50. "Not Forget, But Forgive"; 51. "The Boy with the Thorn in His Side" (心に茨を持つ少年); 52. "Do the Right Thing"; 53. "Peace, Love, and Understanding"; Bonus Four-Panel Strips: "Sexy Pine, Bamboo, and Plum (Sexy High, Middle, and Low)" (SEXY松竹梅)
| 9 | July 23, 2003 | 978-4-06-314325-6 | November 7, 2007 | 978-1-59307-851-5 |
54. "12 Seconds (Beginning)" (12秒間 (前編)); 55. "12 Seconds (Middle)" (12秒間 (中編)); 56. "12 Seconds (End)" (12秒間 (後編)); 57. "12 Seconds (Kill the Poor)" (12秒間 (Kill the Poor)); 58. "It's Show Time!" (It's a TV Show Time!); 59. "Rescue"; 60. "Cherry Blossom"; 61. "Roots"
| 10 | November 21, 2003 | 978-4-06-314334-8 | May 7, 2008 | 978-1-59307-957-4 |
62. "Idiotic, Useless, and Beautiful Behavior (Beginning)" (Idiotic, Useless, and Beautiful Behavior (前編)); 63. "Idiotic, Useless, and Beautiful Behavior (End)" (Idiotic, Useless, and Beautiful Behavior (後編)); 64. "July 26, 2112"; 65. "Chase"; 66. "Disclosure Virus" (ディスクロージャー・ウイルス); 67. "Escape" (脱出); 68. "Please Trust Me" (Trust Me, Please)
| 11 | July 23, 2004 | 978-4-06-314349-2 | February 4, 2009 | 978-1-59582-244-4 |
69. "Ambush" (待ち伏せ); 70. "Traces"; 71. "Aletheia" (Aleetheia (アレテイア)); 72. "Welcome to Sydney"; 73. "Confluence"; 74. "Extinction"; 75. "Exploration" (踏査); 76. "Transfer" (転送)
| 12 | February 23, 2005 | 978-4-06-314370-6 | September 2, 2009 | 978-1-59582-296-3 |
77. "Siege" (包囲); 78. "Maya and Letheia" (マーヤとレティア); 79. "Sniff Up Some Peace of Mind" (Sniff Up a Peace Mind); 80. "Kill by the Sword" (切り捨て); 81. "Brilliant Tree (Beginning)" (Brilliant Tree <前編>); 82. "Brilliant Tree (Middle)" (Brilliant Tree <中編>); 83. "Brilliant Tree (End)" (Brilliant Tree <後編>)
| 13 | September 21, 2005 | 978-4-06-314390-4 | August 31, 2011 | 978-1-59582-763-0 |
84. "Back to the Cruel World (Beginning)" (Back to the Cruel World <前編>); 85. "Back to the Cruel World (Middle)" (Back to the Cruel World <中編>); 86. "Back to the Cruel World (End)" (Back to the Cruel World <後編>); 87. "Heaven's Vengeance (Beginning)" (天網恢恢 <前編>); 88. "Heaven's Vengeance (Middle)" (天網恢恢 <中編>); 89. "Heaven's Vengeance (End)" (天網恢恢 <後編>); 90. "The Whole of the Moon"
| 14 | March 23, 2006 | 978-4-06-314407-9 | March 26, 2014 | 978-1-61655-288-6 |
91. "Save the World"; 92. "Rise and Fall"; 93. "Expensive Life"; 94. "Give Peace a Chance"; 95. "Interval"; 96. "Exposure"; 97. "Doing the Unstuck"
| 15 | October 23, 2006 | 978-4-06-314431-4 | — | — |
98. "Fine Time"; 99. "Vanishing Point"; 100. Shūsoku (収束); 101. Muda Shi ni (無駄死に); 102. Muda toka Itteru Njanē (無駄とか言ってるんじゃねぇ); 103. "Father Figure"; 104. "A Little Catastrophe"
| 16 | April 23, 2007 | 978-4-06-314454-3 | — | — |
105. Icon (Zenpen) (Icon <前編>); 106. Icon (Chūhen) (Icon <中編>); 107. Icon (Kōhen) (Icon <後編>); 108. Not All Things Must Pass (Zenpen) (Not All Things Must Pass <前編>); 109. Not All Things Must Pass (Kōhen) (Not All Things Must Pass <後編>); 110. "Big Barrel"; 111. "Get Back"
| 17 | December 21, 2007 | 978-4-06-314481-9 | — | — |
112. Hakamairi (墓参り); 113. Kidō Erebētā janaidesu (軌道エレベーターじゃないです); 114. "The Companions"; 115. Warui Oyajitachi (わるいおやじたち); 116. Warui Oyajitachi 2+Shingata Nano Mashin (わるいおやじたち2+新型ナノ・マシン); 117. Kō Jūryoku Baburu (高重力バブル); 118. Machi Akari (街明かり)
| 18 | July 23, 2008 | 978-4-06-314515-1 | — | — |
119. Shinnyū (侵入); 120. Toppa (突破); 121. Tōchaku (到着); 122. "Back to the Old House"; 123. Amai Mayu (甘い繭); 124. Innen (因縁); 125. "Here Come the Warm Jets"; 126. "People Get Ready"

== Reception ==
Eden was named Wizard magazine's best manga of 2007. In his review of another work by Hiroki Endo titled Hiroki Endo's Tanpenshu, David F. Smith of Newtype USA called Eden one of the best manga American money can buy. In Manga: The Complete Guide, writer Jason Thompson rated it two-and-a-half stars out of four, stating that once the manga shifts into a military action story after its "postapocalyptic survival" prologue, "the characters and themes are secondary to the combat, ultimately to the detriment of the story." Reviewing the first two Dark Horse volumes, Carlo Santos of Anime News Network found its themes to be "ham-fisted ... [with] mechanical dialogues on religion and philosophy throughout the story." He reserved the most acclaim for its action sequences and art, giving it a "B". Mike Toole of Anime News Network was more positive and declared Eden an example of a "Great Manga with No Anime", noting how well it "strikes an oddly euphoric tone, keeping proceedings light and fast-paced in spite of the near-constant death, despair, and destruction."
