= In Hand =

Japanese manga series

- First tankōbon volume cover, featuring Tetsu Himokura

インハンド (In Hando)
- Genre: Medical; Suspense
- Manga

Nemesis no Tsue
- Written by: Ao Akato
- Published by: Kodansha
- Imprint: Afternoon KC
- Magazine: Monthly Afternoon
- Original run: January 25, 2013 – June 25, 2013
- Volumes: 1
- Manga

Himokura Hakase to Majime na Migiude
- Written by: Ao Akato
- Published by: Kodansha
- Imprint: Afternoon KC
- Magazine: Monthly Afternoon
- Original run: March 25, 2016 – May 25, 2016
- Volumes: 1
- Manga
- Written by: Ao Akato
- Published by: Kodansha
- Imprint: Evening KC
- Magazine: Evening; (October 23, 2018 – November 24, 2020); Comic Days; (December 12, 2024 – February 13, 2025)
- Original run: October 23, 2018 – February 13, 2025
- Volumes: 6
- Television drama
- Directed by: Shunichi Hirano
- Produced by: Atsuya Asano (TBS Sparkle); Sato Atsushi (TBS Sparkle)
- Written by: Yasuhiro Yoshida; Teppei Fukuda
- Music by: Masahiro Tokuda
- Studio: TBS Sparkle; TBS
- Original network: JNN (TBS)
- Original run: April 12, 2019 – June 21, 2019
- Episodes: 11
- icon

In Hand (Japanese: インハンド, Hepburn: In Hando) is a Japanese manga series written and illustrated by Ao Akato. It was serialized in Kodansha's seinen manga magazine Evening from October 2018 to November 2020, and in the Comic Days website from December 2024 to February 2025. Its chapters were collected in six tankōbon volumes. An eleven-episode Japanese television drama adaptation was broadcast on TBS and its affiliates from April to June 2019.

Akato launched two previous manga series in Kodansha's seinen manga magazine Monthly Afternoon; Nemesis no Tsue, published in 2013, and In Hand: Himokura Hakase to Majime na Migiude, published in 2016.

== Plot ==
Tetsu Himokura is a brilliant but eccentric parasitologist, spending his days in his home studying parasites with his prosthetic right arm. He takes on difficult, even criminal cases outside his field of expertise, thanks to his advanced scientific methods and extensive knowledge in various fields beyond medicine.

== Characters ==
=== Main characters ===
Tetsu Himokura (紐倉 哲, Himokura Tetsu)
Portrayed by: Tomohisa Yamashita
Haruma Takaie (高家 春馬, Takaie Haruma)
Portrayed by: Gaku Hamada
Tomoe Makino (牧野 巴, Makino Tomoe)
Portrayed by: Nanao

=== Supporting characters ===
Hayato Mikoshiba (御子柴 隼人, Mikoshiba Hayato)
Portrayed by: Shingo Fujimori
Mio Kumagai (熊谷 美緒, Kumagai Mio)
Portrayed by: Haori Takahashi
Yukio Shirota (城田 幸雄, Shirota Yukio)
Portrayed by: Takahiro Sakai
Kazunari Fukuyama (福山 和成, Fukuyama Kazunari)
Portrayed by: Saburō Tokitō
Hiroshi Yamazaki (山崎 裕, Yamazaki Hiroshi)
Portrayed by: Tomorowo Taguchi
Tōru Ōtani (大谷 透, Ōtani Tōru)
Portrayed by: Takashi Matsuo
Mikio Segawa (瀬川 幹夫, Segawa Mikio)
Portrayed by: Gō Rijū
Hajime Amino (網野 肇, Amino Hajime)
Portrayed by: Ken Mitsuishi

== Media ==
=== Manga ===
Before creating In Hand, Ao Akato launched a short manga series, titled Nemesis no Tsue (ネメシスの杖; 'Staff of Nemesis'), which ran in Kodansha's seinen manga magazine Monthly Afternoon from January 25 to June 25, 2013. Its chapters were collected in a single tankōbon volume, released on September 20, 2013.

A three-chapter prologue miniseries, titled In Hand: Himokura Hakase to Majime na Migiude (インハンド 紐倉博士とまじめな右腕; 'In Hand: Dr. Himokura and His Serious Right Arm'), was serialized in Monthly Afternoon from March 25 to May 25, 2016. Its chapters were collected in a single tankōbon volume, released on July 22, 2016. Both the miniseries and Nemesis no Tsue were republished in two volumes on February 22, 2019, under the title In Hand: Prologue (インハンド プロローグ, In Hando: Purorōgu).

In Hand was serialized in Kodansha's seinen manga magazine Evening from October 23, 2018, to November 24, 2020. It was later revived in Kodansha's Comic Days website on December 12, 2024, where it was serialized until February 13, 2025. Kodansha collected its chapters in six tankōbon volumes, released from March 22, 2019, to March 12, 2025.

==== Volumes ====
No.	Japanese release date	Japanese ISBN
1	March 22, 2019	978-4-06-515055-9
2	September 19, 2019	978-4-06-516833-2
3	March 23, 2020	978-4-06-518914-6
4	July 20, 2020	978-4-06-520285-2
5	February 22, 2021	978-4-06-521731-3
6	March 12, 2025	978-4-06-538694-1

=== Drama ===
In Hand was adapted into a 11-episode Japanese television drama, which was broadcast on TBS from April 12 to June 21, 2019. It stars Tomohisa Yamashita as protagonist Dr. Tetsu Himokura, Gaku Hamada as assistant Haruma Takaie, and Nanao as politician Tomoe Makino.

The drama won three awards at the 23rd Nikkan Sports Drama Grand Prix, including Best Drama; Hamada won Best Actor, and Nanao won Best Actress.

== See also ==
- Rieux o Machinagara, another manga series by the same author
