= All-Rounder Meguru =

Japanese manga series

- First tankōbon volume cover

オールラウンダー廻 (Ōru Raundā Meguru)
- Genre: Sports
- Manga
- Written by: Hiroki Endo
- Published by: Kodansha
- English publisher: NA: Kodansha USA (digital)
- Imprint: Evening KC
- Magazine: Evening
- Original run: November 25, 2008 – March 8, 2016
- Volumes: 19
- icon

All-Rounder Meguru (Japanese: オールラウンダー廻, Hepburn: Ōru Raundā Meguru) is a Japanese sports manga series written and illustrated by Hiroki Endo. It was serialized in Kodansha's seinen manga magazine Evening from November 2008 to April 2016, with its chapters collected in 19 tankōbon volumes.

== Plot ==
Meguru (Kai) Takayanagi, a high school student, begins practicing Shoot, a form of mixed martial arts, initially treating it as a casual activity. Drawing on his background in karate, he gradually becomes more involved in the sport and enters amateur competitions, despite not being fully committed initially.

During one tournament, Meguru reunites with his childhood friend Takashi Yamabukigi, who approaches martial arts with a far more serious and disciplined mindset. Their encounter, now as opponents, leaves a strong impression on Meguru, motivating him to take his training more seriously and reevaluate his purpose in fighting. While Meguru seeks meaning and personal growth through MMA, Takashi pursues his own ambitions with a newly found focus.

== Publication ==
Written and illustrated by Hiroki Endo, All-Rounder Meguru was serialized in Kodansha's seinen manga magazine Evening from November 25, 2008, to March 8, 2016. Kodansha collected its chapters in nineteen tankōbon volumes, released from April 23, 2009, to May 23, 2016.

The manga was licensed for English digital release by Kodansha USA in 2017.

=== Volumes ===
No.	Original release date	Original ISBN	English release date	English ISBN
1	April 23, 2009	978-4-06-352264-8	March 7, 2017	978-1-68233-582-6
2	September 23, 2009	978-4-06-352281-5	April 4, 2017	978-1-68233-583-3
3	February 23, 2010	978-4-06-352301-0	May 2, 2017	978-1-68233-584-0
4	August 23, 2010	978-4-06-352325-6	July 25, 2017	978-1-68233-585-7
5	December 22, 2010	978-4-06-352339-3	August 15, 2017	978-1-68233-730-1
6	May 23, 2011	978-4-06-352363-8	March 6, 2018	978-1-64212-151-3
7	October 21, 2011	978-4-06-352375-1	August 7, 2018	978-1-64212-386-9
8	March 23, 2012	978-4-06-352409-3	November 27, 2018	978-1-64212-537-5
9	August 23, 2012	978-4-06-352432-1	February 26, 2019	978-1-64212-673-0
10	December 21, 2012	978-4-06-352441-3	May 28, 2019	978-1-64212-842-0
11	May 23, 2013	978-4-06-352462-8	August 13, 2019 (Note: ANN incorrectly wrote "GN 23")	978-1-64212-983-0
12	September 20, 2013	978-4-06-352482-6	January 8, 2020	978-1-64659-197-8
13	February 21, 2014	978-4-06-352498-7	March 3, 2020	978-1-64659-251-7
14	June 23, 2014	978-4-06-354522-7	May 5, 2020	978-1-64659-353-8
15	November 21, 2014	978-4-06-354545-6	July 7, 2020	978-1-64659-585-3
16	March 23, 2015	978-4-06-354560-9	September 3, 2020	978-1-64659-683-6
17	July 23, 2015	978-4-06-354582-1	November 3, 2020	978-1-64659-789-5
18	December 22, 2015	978-4-06-354597-5	January 5, 2021	978-1-64659-902-8
19	May 23, 2015	978-4-06-354621-7	March 2, 2021	978-1-64659-990-5

== Reception ==
All-Rounder Meguru was one of the Jury Recommended Works at the 18th Japan Media Arts Festival in 2014.
