= Bye-Bye Beanbag =

Japanese manga by Kazuyoshi Takeda

- Volume cover

さよならタマちゃん (Sayonara, Tama-chan)
- Genre: Slice of life
- Manga
- Written by: Kazuyoshi Takeda
- Published by: Kodansha
- English publisher: NA: Abrams ComicArts
- Imprint: Evening KC
- Magazine: Evening
- Original run: July 10, 2012 – July 9, 2013
- Volumes: 1
- icon

Bye-Bye Beanbag (Japanese: さよならタマちゃん, Hepburn: Sayonara, Tama-chan) is a Japanese autobiographical manga written and illustrated by Kazuyoshi Takeda, chronicling his bout with testicular cancer. It was serialized in Kodansha's seinen manga magazine Evening from July 2012 to July 2013, with its chapters collected in a single tankōbon volume. The manga has been licensed for English release in North America by Abrams ComicArts and the collected volume is set to release in March 2027.

== Synopsis ==
At 35 years old, Kazuyoshi Takeda gets diagnosed with testicular cancer. As he undergoes treatment at the hospital, his diagnosis unexpectedly forms bridges between himself and strangers who show up to support him throughout his ordeal.

== Publication ==
Written and illustrated by Kazuyoshi Takeda, Bye-Bye Beanbag was serialized in Kodansha's seinen manga magazine Evening from July 10, 2012, to July 9, 2013. An additional chapter was published in the magazine on August 12, 2013. Kodansha collected the chapters in a single tankōbon volume, released on August 23, 2013.

In February 2026, Abrams ComicArts announced that it had licensed the series for English publication, with the volume set to release under its Kana imprint on March 2, 2027.

== Reception ==
It was nominated for the 18th Tezuka Osamu Cultural Prize Reader Award. It was also nominated for the 7th Manga Taishō, receiving 66 points and placing 3rd among the ten nominees.

== See also ==
- Peleliu: Guernica of Paradise, another manga series by the same author
