= Kosaku Shima =

Japanese manga series

- First tankōbon volume cover of Kachō Shima Kōsaku, featuring Kōsaku Shima

島耕作 (Shima Kōsaku)
- Manga
- Written by: Kenshi Hirokane
- Published by: Kodansha
- Magazine: Morning
- Original run: 1983 – present
- Volumes: 92
- Series titles
- 1. Kachō Shima Kōsaku (1983–1992, 17 volumes); 2. Buchō Shima Kōsaku (1992–2002, 13 volumes); 3. Torishimariyaku Shima Kōsaku (2002–2005, 8 volumes); 4. Jōmu Shima Kōsaku (2005–2006, 6 volumes); 5. Senmu Shima Kōsaku (2006–2008, 5 volumes); 6. Shachō Shima Kōsaku (2008–2013, 16 volumes); 7. Kaichō Shima Kōsaku (2013–2019, 13 volumes); 8. Sōdanyaku Shima Kōsaku (2019–2022, 6 volumes); 9. Shagai Torishimariyaku Shima Kōsaku (2022–present, 8 volumes)
- icon

Kosaku Shima (Japanese: 島耕作, Hepburn: Shima Kōsaku) is a Japanese manga series written and illustrated by Kenshi Hirokane. It depicts the growth and career of a fictional salaryman named Kōsaku Shima. It has been serialized in Kodansha's Morning, starting with the first series Kachō Shima Kōsaku in 1983 and has currently been divided into nine parts. The current part, Shagai Torishimariyaku Shima Kōsaku, began in 2022.

The manga has also been published as 7 bilingual volumes (Japanese-English) called Division Chief Kosaku Shima and President Kosaku Shima, and in French and German. In addition to various manga there has also been one comedic ONA, and two comedic anime adaptations lasting 11 episodes each, a live action film, and a single episode TV drama. The character also acts as the "host" or framing device for a business documentary series on NHK World, Shima Kosaku's Asian Entrepreneurs.

As of February 2022, the series had over 47 million copies in circulation, making it one of the best-selling manga series. In 1991, the manga won the 15th Kodansha Manga Award in the General category.

== Summary ==
At the start of the long-running series, Kōsaku Shima is a kachō, or section chief, of a huge conglomerate, Hatsushiba Electric. He is later promoted to buchō (division chief) and eventually promoted to manager and executive-director, and with each promotion the title of the series changed as well. The fictional conglomerate is modeled after Panasonic/Matsushita Electric, where Hirokane worked before and is highly accurate in its portrayal of Japanese corporate culture.

== Series ==
- Kachō Shima Kōsaku (課長島耕作; 'Section Chief Kōsaku Shima'), 1983–1992: 17 volumes
- Buchō Shima Kōsaku (部長島耕作; 'Division Chief Kōsaku Shima'), 1992–2002: 13 volumes
- Torishimariyaku Shima Kōsaku (取締役島耕作; 'Assistant Director Kōsaku Shima'), 2002–2005: 8 volumes
- Jōmu Shima Kōsaku (常務島耕作; 'Director Kōsaku Shima'), 2005–2006: 6 volumes
- Senmu Shima Kōsaku (専務島耕作; 'Executive Director Kōsaku Shima'), 2006–2008: 5 volumes
- Shachō Shima Kōsaku (社長島耕作; 'President Kōsaku Shima'), 2008–2013: 16 volumes
- Kaichō Shima Kōsaku (会長島耕作; 'Chairman Kōsaku Shima'), 2013–2019: 13 volumes
- Sōdanyaku Shima Kōsaku (相談役島耕作; 'Senior Advisor Kōsaku Shima'), 2019–2022: 6 volumes
- Shagai Torishimariyaku Shima Kōsaku (社外取締役島耕作; 'Outside Director Kōsaku Shima'), 2022–present: 8 volumes

=== Spin-offs ===
- Young Shima Kōsaku (ヤング島耕作; 'Young Kōsaku Shima'), 2001–2006, Evening: 4 volumes
  - Young Shima Kōsaku Shunin-hen (ヤング島耕作 主任編; 'Young Kōsaku Shima Chief Arc'), 2006–2010, Evening: 4 volumes
- Kakarichō Shima Kōsaku (係長島耕作; 'Subsection Chief Kōsaku Shima'), 2010–2013, Evening: 4 volumes
- Gakusei Shima Kōsaku (学生島耕作; 'Student Kōsaku Shima'), 2014–2017, Evening: 6 volumes
  - Gakusei Shima Kōsaku: Shūkatsu-hen (学生島耕作～就活編～; 'Student Kōsaku Shima: Job Hunting Arc'), 2017–2018, Evening: 3 volumes
- Shima Kōsaku no Jikenbo (島耕作の事件簿; 'Kōsaku Shima Case Files'), 2017 (written by Shin Kibayashi), Morning: 1 volume
- Tensei Shitara Shima Kōsaku Datta Ken (転生したら島耕作だった件; 'The Time I Got Reincarnated… as Kōsaku Shima'), 2019
  (crossover with That Time I Got Reincarnated as a Slime; co-written by Fuse and Taiki Kawakami; character design: Mittsubā), Evening: 1 volume
- Kishi Danchō Shima Kōsaku (騎士団長 島耕作; 'The Knight Head Kōsaku Shima'), 2019–2021 (illustrated by Fusuke Miyamoto), Monthly Comic Zero Sum: 3 volumes

== Video games ==
- Kachō Kōsaku Shima: Super Business Adventure (Super Famicom) 1993 (published by Yutaka)
- CR Kachō Kōsaku Shima (Pachinko) 2006 (published by Newgin)
- Kachō Shima Kōsaku DS: Dekiru Otoko no Love & Success (Nintendo DS) 2008 (published by Konami)

== Reception ==
As of February 2022, the series had over 47 million copies in circulation. In 1991, Kachō Shima Kōsaku won the 15th Kodansha Manga Award in the General category. In 2019, the series also received a Special Award at the 43rd Kodansha Manga Award, commemorating 110 years since Kodansha's founding.
