= Me and the Devil Blues (manga) =

Japanese manga series

- First tankōbon volume cover, featuring Robert Johnson

俺と悪魔のブルーズ (Ore to Akuma no Blues)
- Genre: Historical; Psychological horror; Supernatural
- Manga
- Written by: Akira Hiramoto
- Published by: Kodansha
- English publisher: NA: Del Rey Manga
- Imprint: Afternoon KC (2003–2008); Young Magazine KC (2015–2017)
- Magazine: Monthly Afternoon; (November 25, 2003 – February 25, 2008); Young Magazine the 3rd; (February 6, 2015 – March 6, 2017)
- Original run: November 25, 2003 – March 6, 2017 (on hiatus)
- Volumes: 5
- icon

Me and the Devil Blues (Japanese: 俺と悪魔のブルーズ, Hepburn: Ore to Akuma no Burūzu) is a Japanese manga series written and illustrated by Akira Hiramoto. It was serialized in Kodansha's seinen manga magazines Monthly Afternoon (2003 to 2008) and Young Magazine the 3rd (2015 to 2017). The manga was licensed in North America by Del Rey Manga. It tells a fictionalized story of Robert Johnson, and how he became a blues legend.

School Library Journal named Me and the Devil Blues as one of the best adult books for high school students in 2008. Me and the Devil Blues won the 2009 Glyph Comics Awards in the Best Reprint Publication category.

== Plot ==
In the winter of 1929, Robert Johnson lives in Robinsonville, Mississippi, with his family and his pregnant girlfriend, Virginia Travis. While working in the plantation fields, Johnson aspires to become a great blues guitarist. After a disastrous performance in a juke joint, his friends suggest that he perform a ritual: go to the crossroads in the middle of the night, play a song on the guitar, and the devil will gift him the power to play the blues, in exchange for his soul. The next night, Johnson hears a bluesman play an eerie tune in the dark, leaving behind a wooden guitar. Johnson takes the guitar in attempt to return it, only to wander into the middle of a crossroad; he decides to perform the ritual there.

Johnson recounts that night to Virginia, where she suggests the bluesman is the famed Son House. Johnson meets him alongside his partner, Willie Brown, spending the next few days learning to play the blues from them. One night, after no sign of progress, a drunk Johnson leaves the joint and suddenly finds himself in the middle of a cemetery, where he hears the same eerie tune playing. With newfound composure, he returns to play the blues so outstanding, it leaves the entire joint in awe. Immediately after, Johnson's family appears, berating him for seemingly abandoning them. To his horror, six months had inexplicably passed, both House and Brown had never met him, and Virginia is already dead from a failed childbirth. Now on his own, Johnson leaves Robinsonville with his wooden guitar.

A year later, Johnson spends his time honing his guitar-playing skills with his mentor, Ike Zimmerman. One day, they are nearly run over by a stray car driven by Clyde Barrow. In the distance, Barrow crashes his car and is knocked unconscious. Waking up in the middle of the night, he finds himself near a cemetery with an eerie tune playing, leading him to meet Johnson. Recognizing Johnson's blues playing as what he heard in the cemetery, Barrow insists he join him, despite Johnson being wary of his intentions. From there, Johnson and Barrow go on a journey through the South, encountering hostile white supremacists led by child-murderer Stanley O. McDonald, all while Johnson, discovering his right hand now exhibits ten fingers, remains haunted by his deal with the devil.

== Publication ==
The manga takes its name from the title of the Robert Johnson song, "Me and the Devil Blues". Written and illustrated by Akira Hiramoto, it was originally published in Kodansha's seinen manga magazine Monthly Afternoon from November 2003, (Note: Debuted in the magazine's January 2004 issue titled "Hoodoo". The official first chapter released a month later.) to February 2008, when it was put on indefinite hiatus.

The manga was transferred to Kodansha's seinen manga magazine Young Magazine the 3rd in September 2014, a then-recent spin-off to Weekly Young Magazine. Its first chapter was published in February 2015. The series' latest chapter in the magazine was published in March 2017. Young Magazine the 3rd's last issue was released in April 2021. Kodansha has published the first five volumes between January 21, 2005, and July 6, 2015.

In North America, Del Rey Manga released the first four volumes in a two-volumes-in-one format. The first volume (containing volumes 1 and 2 of the Japanese editions) was published on July 29, 2008, and the second volume (containing volumes 3 and 4 of the Japanese editions) was published on December 30, 2008.

=== Volume list ===
No.	Title	Original release date	English release date
1	Cross Road Blues; Mayoigo no Jūjiro (迷い児の十字路)	January 21, 2005; 978-4-06-314365-2	July 29, 2008; 978-0-345-49926-4
0. "Hoodoo"; 1. "Cross Road Blues ①"; 2. "Cross Road Blues ②"; 3. "Cross Road Blues ③"; 4. "Cross Road Blues ④"; 5. "32-20 Blues ①"
2	32-20 Blues; San Jū Ni Kōkei o Migite ni (32口径を右手に)	August 23, 2005; 978-4-06-314388-1	July 29, 2008; 978-0-345-49926-4
6. "32-20 Blues ②"; 7. "32-20 Blues ③"; 8. "32-20 Blues ④"; 9. "32-20 Blues ⑤"; 10. "32-20 Blues ⑥"; 11. "32-20 Blues ⑦"; 12. "32-20 Blues ⑧"; 13. "32-20 Blues ⑨"
3	If I Had Possession Over Judgment Day; Kinshu no Machi (禁酒の町)	July 21, 2006; 978-4-06-314420-8	December 30, 2008; 978-0-345-50137-0
14. "32-20 Blues ⑩"; 15. "If I Had Possession Over Judgment Day ①"; 16. "If I Had Possession Over Judgment Day ②"; 17. "If I Had Possession Over Judgment Day ③"; 18. "If I Had Possession Over Judgment Day ④"; 19. "If I Had Possession Over Judgment Day ⑤"; 20. "If I Had Possession Over Judgment Day ⑥"
4	Hell Hound on My Trail; Jigoku no Ryōken ni Ogore (地獄の猟犬に奢れ)	September 21, 2007; 978-4-06-314467-3	December 30, 2008; 978-0-345-50137-0
21. "If I Had Possession Over Judgment Day ⑦"; 22. "Hell Hound on My Trail ①"; 23. "Hell Hound on My Trail ②"; 24. "Hell Hound on My Trail ③"; 25. "Hell Hound on My Trail ④"; 26. "Hell Hound on My Trail ⑤"; 27. "Hell Hound on My Trail ⑥"; 28. "Hell Hound on My Trail ⑦"
5	From Four Until Late; Yofuke no Hōkō (夜更けの彷徨)	July 6, 2015; 978-4-06-382572-5	—
29. "Hell Hound on My Trail ⑧"; 30. "Hell Hound on My Trail ⑨"; 31. "Hell Hound on My Trail ⑩"; 32. "Hell Hound on My Trail ⑪"; 33. "From Four Until Late ①"; 34. "From Four Until Late ②"

=== Chapters not yet in tankōbon format ===
- 35. "From Four Until Late ③"
- 36. "From Four Until Late ④"
- 37. "They're Red Hot ①"
- 38. "They're Red Hot ②"

== Reception ==
School Library Journal named Me and the Devil Blues as one of the best adult books for high school students in 2008. The 2009 Glyph Comics Awards was awarded to Me and the Devil Blues for the Best Reprint Publication. About.com's Deb Aoki lists Me and the Devil Blues as the best "underappreciated gem" of 2008 along with Shoulder-a-Coffin Kuro.

Anime News Network's Casey Brienza commends the manga for its "superb, historically accurate artwork and an intriguing, original story premise" but criticises the manga for its "painfully slow narrative pacing, silly plot points, and a whiff of unintentional bigotry". About.com's Deb Aoki criticises the manga for its "lots of strong language, sex and graphic violence [which] makes this mostly an adult pleasure". Mania.com's Nadia Oxford commends the manga for its "surreal mix of fantasy and reality" that portray what could have happened to Robert Johnson. Comic Book Bin's Leroy Douresseaux commends the manga for its "stunning visuals, which Hiramoto composes using a variety of styles, techniques, and media". Peter Gutiérrez from Graphic Novel Reporter comments on the manga's use of its "Faustian premise to work squarely in the Southern Gothic mode of the horror genre, Hiramoto then shifts the tempo and tone quite radically". John Thomas from Comics Village commends Hiramoto for "his valiant attempt to bring a long-gone Southern bluesman's story to a modern Japanese audience". Jason Thompson, in the online appendix to Manga: The Complete Guide, wrote "The passive protagonist and depressing narrative, coupled with a weak non-ending ... , make for a disappointing narrative, although the art is chilling and lovely and it has many fine page-turner sequences."
