= Kenshi Hirokane =

Japanese manga artist

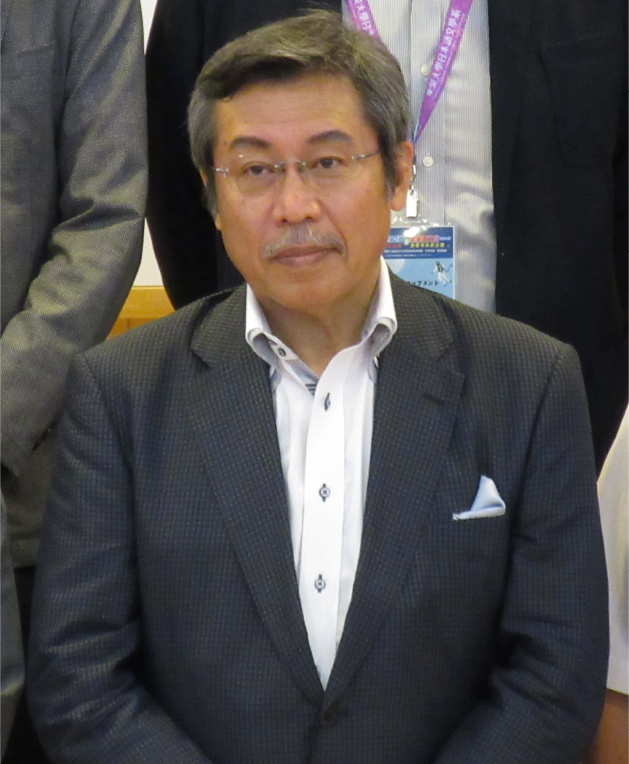
Kenshi Hirokane in Soochow University, Taiwan

Kenshi Hirokane (Japanese: 弘兼 憲史, Hepburn: Hirokane Kenshi; born September 9, 1947) is a Japanese manga artist from Iwakuni, Yamaguchi. He graduated from Waseda University with a degree in law, then worked for Matsushita Electric for four years, before making his manga debut in 1974 with Kaze Kaoru.

Hirokane is known for manga that addresses social issues, as well as for creating the best-selling seinen manga Hello Harinezumi, adapted as an original video animation (OVA) called Domain of Murder. He has received numerous awards, including the 1985 Shogakukan Manga Award for seinen/general manga as the artist for Human Crossing, the 1991 Kodansha Manga Award for general manga for Kachō Kōsaku Shima, and an Excellence Prize for manga at the 2000 Japan Media Arts Festival for Tasogare Ryūseigun ("Like Shooting Stars in the Twilight").

He is married to manga artist Fumi Saimon. They have a son and a daughter.
