= Sanzoku Diary =

Japanese manga series

- First tankōbon volume cover

山賊ダイアリー (Sanzoku Daiarī)
- Genre: Autobiographical; Cooking; Hunting
- Manga
- Written by: Kentarō Okamoto
- Published by: Kodansha
- Magazine: Evening
- Original run: February 22, 2011 – August 9, 2016
- Volumes: 7
- Manga

Sanzoku Diary SS
- Written by: Kentarō Okamoto
- Published by: Kodansha
- Magazine: Evening
- Original run: December 13, 2016 – April 25, 2017
- Volumes: 1
- icon

Sanzoku Diary (Japanese: 山賊ダイアリー, Hepburn: Sanzoku Daiarī; lit. 'Bandit Diary') is a Japanese manga series written and illustrated by Kentarō Okamoto. It was serialized in Kodansha's seinen manga magazine Evening from February 2011 to August 2016, with its chapters collected in seven tankōbon volumes. A sequel, titled Sanzoku Diary, began in Evening in December 2016.

== Media ==
=== Manga ===
Written and illustrated by Kentarō Okamoto, Sanzoku Diary was serialized in Kodansha's Evening from February 22, 2011, to August 9, 2016. Kodansha collected its chapters in seven tankōbon volumes, released from December 22, 2011, to October 21, 2016.

A sequel, titled Sanzoku Diary SS (山賊ダイアリーSS, Sanzoku Daiarī SS), began in Evening on December 13, 2016. Its latest chapter was released on April 25, 2017.

==== Sanzoku Diary ====
No.	Japanese release date	Japanese ISBN
1	December 22, 2011	978-4-06-352391-1
2	July 23, 2012	978-4-06-352426-0
3	March 22, 2013	978-4-06-352454-3
4	November 22, 2013	978-4-06-352488-8
5	August 22, 2014	978-4-06-354526-5; 978-4-06-362280-5 (SE)
6	June 23, 2015	978-4-06-354575-3; 978-4-06-358767-8 (SE)
7	October 21, 2016	978-4-06-354628-6; 978-4-06-362343-7 (SE)

==== Sanzoku Diary SS ====
No.	Japanese release date	Japanese ISBN
1	July 21, 2017	978-4-06-354680-4; 978-4-06-358852-1 (SE)

=== Original video animation ===
A 15-minute original video animation (OVA) produced by DLE was bundled with the special edition of the sixth volume of the manga on June 23, 2015.

== Reception ==
Volume 4 reached the 45th place on the weekly Oricon manga chart and, as of December 1, 2013, has sold 39,582 copies; volume 5 also reached the 45th place and, as of August 24, 2014, has sold 21,880 copies.

In 2013, the manga was nominated for the sixth Manga Taishō, receiving 29 points and placing 10th among the eleven nominees. In 2014, it was also nominated for Best General Manga at the 38th Kodansha Manga Awards.
