= Hiroki Endo =

Japanese manga artist

- Born: 1970 (age 55–56); Akita Prefecture, Japan
- Occupation: Manga artist
- Writing career
- Genre: Fiction
- Notable works: Eden; All-Rounder Meguru

Hiroki Endo (遠藤 浩輝, Endō Hiroki; born November 3, 1970 in Akita Prefecture) is a Japanese manga artist. He graduated from Musashino Art University. He is most known for his science-fiction series Eden: It's an Endless World!, which has been translated into English by Dark Horse.

== Manga works ==
=== Serialized works ===
- Eden: It's an Endless World! (1997–2008)
- Meltdown (メルトダウン) (2002, serialization suspended)
- Hantei Shiai Jōtō! (判定試合上等!) (2006, serialization interrupted)
- All-Rounder Meguru (オールラウンダー廻) (2008–2016)
- Soft Metal Vampire (ソフトメタルヴァンパイア) (2016–2018)
- Planet of the Fools (愚者の星) (2019–2022)

=== Short story collections ===
- Hiroki Endo's Tanpenshu (遠藤浩輝短編集) (1995–2001)
  - The Crows, the Girl and the Yakuza (カラスと少女とヤクザ) (1995)
  - Because You're Definitely a Cute Girl (きっとかわいい女の子だから) (1996)
  - For Those of Us Who Don't Believe in God (神様なんて信じていない僕らのために) (1997)
  - Hang (2001)
  - High School Girl 2000 (女子高生2000) (1999)
  - Platform (プラットホーム) (1996)
  - Boys Don't Cry (ボーイズ・ドント・クライ)
