= Akira Hiramoto =

Japanese manga artist

Akira Hiramoto 平本 アキラ
- Born: 1976 (age 49–50) Okinawa Prefecture
- Area: Manga artist
- Notable works: Agonashi Gen to Ore Monogatari; Me and the Devil Blues; Prison School
- Awards: Glyph Comics Awards (2009), Kodansha Manga Award (2013)

Akira Hiramoto (Japanese: 平本 アキラ, Hepburn: Hiramoto Akira; born 1976) is a Japanese manga artist. He made his debut with Sono Tomodachi ni Gimon Ari story in 1995 in Weekly Young Magazine. He is best known as the creator of Prison School, which won the General Manga Category award at the 2013 Kodansha Awards, and Me and the Devil Blues, which has won the 2009 Glyph Comics Awards for the Best Reprint Publication.

== Works ==
- Agonashi Gen to Ore Monogatari (アゴなしゲンとオレ物語) (1997–2009) —– Writer, artist
- Me and the Devil Blues (俺と悪魔のブルーズ) (2004–2008, 2015–present) —– Writer, artist
- Yarisugi Companion to Atashi Monogatari (やりすぎコンパニオンとアタシ物語) (2007–2008) —– Writer, artist
- Youkei Seijuku Onna Hilda (幼形成熟女ヒルダ) (2011) —– Writer, artist
- Prison School (監獄学園) (2011–2017) —– Writer, artist
- Raw Hero (2018–2020) —– Writer, artist
- Futari Switch (ふたりスイッチ) (2022–present) —– Writer, artist
- Super Ball Girls (スーパーボールガールズ) (2022–2026) —– Artist; written by Muneyuki Kaneshiro
