= List of cooking anime and manga =

This is a list of cooking anime, manga, original video animations (OVAs), original net animations (ONAs), and films.

| Year | Title | Creator(s) | Original medium | Demographic |
|---|---|---|---|---|
| 2016 | 1-nichi Gaishutsuroku Hanchō (One Day Pass Foreman) | Tensei Hagiwara and Nobuyuki Fukumoto | Manga | Seinen |
| 2001 | Addicted to Curry | Kazuki Funatsu | Manga | Seinen |
| 1986 | Aji Ichi Monme (A Pinch of Seasoning) | Zenta Abe and Yoshimi Kurata | Manga | Seinen |
| 2016 | Amaama-kun no Okashi na Yuuwaku (The Funny Temptation of Amaama-kun) | Mitsuru Tokino | Manga | Shōjo |
| 2020 | Aikagi-kun to Shiawase Gohan | Hajime Kuromugi | Manga | |
| 2006 | Angel's Frypan | Etsushi Ogawa | Manga | Shōnen |
| 1999 | Antique Bakery | Fumi Yoshinaga | Manga | Shōjo |
| 2009 | Bakumeshi! (Food Explosion) | Shigeru Tsuchiyama | Manga | Seinen |
| 2004 | Bambino! | Tetsuji Sekiya | Manga | Seinen |
| 1985 | Banzai Oryouri Papa | Shirou Azuma and Sanpei Yamada | Manga | Seinen |
| 1985 | Bar Lemon Heart | Mitsutoshi Furuya | Manga | Seinen |
| 2004 | Bartender | Yasuhiro Imagawa | Manga | Seinen |
| 2016 | Beauty and the Feast (Yakumo-san wa Eduke ga Shitai) | Satomi U | Manga | Seinen |
| 2015 | Bishoku Tantei Akechi Gorou (Gourmet Detective) | Akiko Higashimura | Manga | Josei |
| 2014 | Bonjour Sweet Love Patisserie | Noriaki Akitaya | ONA | Shōjo |
| 2019 | Botan Kamiina Fully Blossoms When Drunk | Hey | Manga | Yuri |
| 2014 | Bōkyaku no Sachiko (A Meal Makes Her Forget) | Jun Abe | Manga | Seinen |
| 2011 | BQ Cooking! | Ten Nakamura | Manga | Shōnen |
| 1970 | Cake Cake Cake | Aya Ichinoki and Moto Hagio | Manga | Shōjo |
| 2016 | Campfire Cooking in Another World with My Absurd Skill | Ren Eguchi | Light novel | |
| 1985 | The Chef | Tadashi Katou | Manga | |
| 2011 | A Chef of Nobunaga | Mitsuru Nishimura | Manga | Seinen |
| 1978 | Choco Cookie no Okurimono | Akino Mimura | Manga | Shōjo |
| 1995 | Chūka Ichiban! (Cooking Master Boy!) | Etsushi Ogawa | Manga | Shōnen |
| 2014 | Coffee Ikaga Deshō (Would You Like Some Coffee?) | Misato Konari | Manga | |
| 2011 | Cook Doppo | Gouta Yamanaka and Jinnosuke Uotsuka | Manga | Shōnen |
| 2009 | Cookin' Idol Ai! Mai! Main! | | Anime | |
| 1985 | Cooking Papa | Tochi Ueyama | Manga | Seinen |
| 2020 | Cooking with Valkyries | miHoYo | Video game | |
| 2014 | Cooking with Wild Game | EDA and Kochimo | Light novel | |
| 2000 | Cuisinier | Mitsuru Nishimura and Masato Naka | Manga | Seinen |
| 2014 | Dagashi Kashi | Kotoyama | Manga | Shōnen |
| 2016 | Dandara Gohan | Miyuki Tonogaya | Manga | |
| 1996 | Delicious! | Miyuki Kobayashi | Manga | Shōjo |
| 2014 | Delicious in Dungeon | Ryōko Kui | Manga | Seinen |
| 1986 | Delicious Koitaro | Kouichi Saitou and Tomohisa Nagao | Manga | Seinen |
| 2022 | Delicious Party Pretty Cure | Izumi Todo, Sawako Hirabayashi | Anime | Shōjo |
| 2007 | Dining Bar Akira | Tomoko Yamashita | Manga | Josei |
| 2016 | Drifting Dragons | Taku Kuwabara | Manga | Seinen |
| 2004 | Drops of God | Tadashi Agi and Shu Akimoto | Manga | Seinen |
| 1999 | Edomae no Shun (Tokyo-style Seasonal Dishes) | Mori Tsukumo and Terushi Satō | Manga | Seinen |
| 2002 | Edomae Sushi Shokunin: Kirara no Shigoto | Hikari Hayakawa and Kozou Hashimoto | Manga | Seinen |
| 2006 | Ekiben Hitoritabi | Kan Sakurai and Jun Hayase | Manga | Seinen |
| 2016 | Farming Life in Another World | Kinosuke Naito, Yasumo | Light novel | Shōnen |
| 2018 | Fermat Kitchen | Yuugo Kobayashi | Manga | Shōnen |
| 1998 | Fighting Foodons (Bistro Recipe) | Naoto Tsushima | Manga | Shōnen |
| 2019 | The Food Diary of Miss Maid | Susumu Maeya | Manga | Seinen |
| 2025 | Food for the Soul | Atto, Team Apa, Yoshihiro Hiki | Anime | Seinen |
| 2012 | Food Wars!: Shokugeki no Soma | Yūto Tsukuda and Shun Saeki | Manga | Shōnen |
| 2019 | The Forsaken Saintess and Her Foodie Roadtrip in Another World | Yoneori, Akane Nito, Nana Kogami | Novel | |
| 2016 | Giant Spider & Me: A Post-Apocalyptic Tale | Kikori Morino | Manga | Seinen |
| 2015 | Gohan no Otomo | | Manga | |
| 2006 | Gokudō Meshi (Scoundrels' Meals) | Shigeru Tsuchiyama | Manga | Seinen |
| 2018 | Gokushufudō (The Way of the Househusband) | Kousuke Oono | Manga | Seinen |
| 2012 | Gourmet Girl Graffiti | Makoto Kawai | Manga | Seinen |
| 2006 | Gu Ra Me!: Daisaishou no Ryourinin | Mitsuru Oosaki and Mitsuru Nishimura | Manga | Seinen |
| 2009 | Gurume Tantei Ryouji (Ryoji Renjo: Gourmet Detective) | Tadashi Katou | Manga | Seinen |
| 2009 | Hana no Zubora-Meshi (Hana's Sloppy Meals) | Masayuki Kusumi and Etsuko Mizusawa | Manga | Josei |
| 2017 | Have a Coffee After School, in Another World | Kazamidori | Light novel | |
| 2010 | Hell's Kitchen | Mitsuru Nishimura | Manga | Shōnen |
| 2009 | Himitsu no Recipe (Secret Recipe) | Milk Morinaga | Manga | |
| 1973 | Hōchōnin Ajihei (Ajihei the Cook) | Jirō Gyū and Jō Big | Manga | Shōnen |
| 1982 | Hōchō Mushuku | Yasuyuki Tagawa | Manga | Seinen |
| 2014 | Hokusai to Meshi sae Areba | Sanami Suzuki | Manga | Seinen |
| 2015 | Honjitsu no Burger (Today's Burger) | Umetarou Saitani and Rei Hanagata | Manga | Seinen |
| 2010 | Internet Shopping Prince Yoshimi Ida | Shiho Takase | Manga | Seinen |
| 1985 | Ippon Bouchou Mantarou | Jō Big | Manga | Shōnen |
| 1995 | Iron Wok Jan | Shinji Saijyo | Manga | Shōnen |
| 2012 | Isekai Izakaya "Nobu" (Other World Izakaya "Nobu", Isekai Izakaya: Japanese Food From Another World) | Natsuya Semikawa | Light novel | |
| 2018 | Isekai Kitchen | Gohan Okome and Ichiho Katsura | Manga | |
| 2017 | Isekai Omotenashi Gohan | Shinobumaru and Medamayaki | Manga | Seinen |
| 2012 | Itsuka Tiffany de Choushoku wo ( 'It will be Breakfast at Tiffany's Someday) | Makihirochi | Manga | Seinen |
| 2014 | Izakaya Bottakuri | Shiwasuda and Takimi Akikawa | Novel | |
| 2011 | Izakaya Sachiko | Hozumi | Manga | Josei |
| 2016 | Kakuriyo no Yadomeshi: Ayakashi Oyado ni Yomeiri shimasu (Kakuriyo: Bed and Breakfast for Spirits) | Wako Ioka and Midori Yuuma | Manga | Shōjo |
| 2019 | Kawasemi-san no Tsuri Gohan (Kawasemi's Fishing and Cooking) | Kiyomasa Masanoshita | Manga | |
| 2017 | Kirakira Pretty Cure a la Mode | Toei Animation | Anime | Shōjo |
| 2004 | Kitchen Princess | Miyuki Kobayashi | Manga | |
| 1994 | Kodoku no Gourmet (The Solitary Gourmet) | Jiro Taniguchi and Masayuki Kusumi | Manga | Seinen |
| 2012 | Kū Neru Futari Sumu Futari | Kinoko Higurashi | Manga | Seinen |
| 2002 | KuiTan | Daisuke Terasawa | Manga | Seinen |
| 2002 | Little Forest | Daisuke Igarashi | Manga | Seinen |
| 2017 | Love Kome: We Love Rice | | Anime | |
| 2016 | Maiko-san chi no Makanai-san (The Caterer at the Maiko Manor, Kiyo in Kyoto: From the Maiko House) | Aiko Koyama | Manga | Shōnen |
| 2016 | Mentsuyu Hitori Meshi | Mizuki Setoguchi | Manga | Seinen |
| 2016 | Meshinuma. | Amidamuku | Manga | Seinen |
| 2016 | Misoshiru de Kanpai! | Sai Sasano | Manga | Shōnen |
| 2005 | Mixed Vegetables | Ayumi Komura | Manga | Shōjo |
| 1986 | Mister Ajikko | Daisuke Terasawa | Manga | Shōnen |
| 2025 | Momentary Lily | GoHands, Shochiku, Tamazō Yanagi, Shingo Suzuki | Anime | |
| 2018 | Mori Girl (Spearfishing Girl) | Hirohito Iwakuni | Manga | |
| 2001 | Mōtto! Ojamajo Doremi | Toei Animation | Anime | |
| 2013 | Ms. Koizumi Loves Ramen Noodles | Naru Narumi | Manga | Seinen |
| 2002 | Muteki Kanban Musume (The Unbeatable Delivery Girl, Noodle Fighter Miki) | Jun Sadogawa | Manga | Shōnen |
| 2013 | Nagisa Shokudou | Kamiya Fujisawa | Manga | |
| 1999 | Natsu no Kura | Akira Oze | Manga | Seinen |
| 1988 | Natsuko no Sake | Akira Oze | Manga | Seinen |
| 2015 | Nohara Hiroshi Hirumeshi no Ryūgi | Yoshito Usui, Yōichi Tsukahara | Manga | Seinen |
| 2005 | Not Love But Delicious Foods Make Me So Happy | Fumi Yoshinaga | Manga | Josei |
| 1991 | Oh! My Konbu | Yasu Akimoto and Takahiro Kamiya | Manga | Shōnen |
| 2014 | Oishii Kamishama (Delicious Venus) | Tōru Fujisawa | Manga | Shōnen |
| 1983 | Oishinbo (The Gourmet) | Tetsu Kariya and Akira Hanasaki | Manga | Seinen |
| 2015 | Osake wa Fūfu ni Natte kara (Love Is Like a Cocktail) | Crystal na Yōsuke | Manga | Seinen |
| 2015 | Our Dining Table | Ori Mita | Manga | Josei |
| 2014 | Papa to Oyaji no Uchi Gohan | Yuu Toyota | Manga | Seinen |
| 2019 | Pass the Monster Meat, Milady! | Kanata Hoshi, Peperon | Novel | |
| 2013 | Piacevole! (Piace: Watashi no Italian, Piace: My Italian Cooking) | Atsuko Watanabe | Manga | Shōnen |
| 1984 | Prince of Curry | Izumi Kawahara | Manga | Shōjo |
| 2022 | Red Cat Ramen (Ramen Akaneko) | Angyaman | Manga | Shōnen |
| 2013 | Restaurant to Another World | Junpei Inuzuka | Novel | |
| 2005 | Ristorante Paradiso (Rispara) | Natsume Ono | Manga | |
| 2013 | Rokuhōdō Yotsuiro Biyori | Yū Shimizu | Manga | Seinen |
| 2014 | Saboriman Ametani Kantarou (Kantaro: The Sweet Tooth Salaryman) | Tensei Hagiwara and Inoue ABD | Manga | Seinen |
| 1994 | Sake no Hosomichi | Hosoki Roswell | Manga | Seinen |
| 2016 | Seasoned Connections | Yuki Shirono | Manga | Seinen |
| 2017 | Sengoku Komachi Kuroutan: Noukou Giga | Hajime Sawada and Kyouchikutou | Manga | |
| 2015 | Shinmai Shimai no Futari Gohan | Yutaka Hiiragi | Manga | |
| 2006 | Shin'ya Shokudō (Midnight Diner, La Cantine de minuit) | Yarō Abe | Manga | Seinen |
| 1987 | Shiritsu Ajikari Gakuen | Koka Akane and Toshio Tanigami | Manga | Shōnen |
| 1992 | Shōta no Sushi (Shōta's Sushi) | Daisuke Terasawa | Manga | Shōnen |
| 1999 | Shoku King | Shigeru Tsuchiyama | Manga | Seinen |
| 2009 | Shoku no Gunshi | Masayuki Izumi | Manga | Seinen |
| 2018 | Skill "Daidokoro Shoukan" wa Sugoi!: Isekai de Gohan Tsukutte Point Tamemasu (This "Summon Kitchen" Skill Is Amazing! Amassing Points by Cooking in Another World) | | Manga | Shōjo |
| 2017 | Snack Basue | Forbidden Shibukawa | Manga | Seinen |
| 2003 | Sōta no Hōchō | Yūichirō Sueda and Kei Honjō | Manga | Seinen |
| 2010 | Sugar Apple Fairy Tale | Miri Mikawa and aki | Light novel | Shōjo |
| 2019 | Sugar Dog Life | Yoriko | Manga | Josei |
| 1982 | Super Kuishinbo | Jirō Gyū and Jō Big | Manga | Shōnen |
| 2011 | Sushi | Yoriko Mizushiri | Anime | |
| 2013 | Sushi Ichi! | Etsushi Ogawa | Manga | Seinen |
| 2016 | Sushi Police | KOO-KI | Anime | |
| 2015 | Sweet Reincarnation | Nozomu Koryu | Light novel | |
| 2013 | Sweetness and Lightning | Gido Amagakure | Manga | Seinen |
| 2015 | Takunomi | Haruto Hino | Manga | Seinen |
| 1982 | Tekka no Kenpei | Yuichiro Obayashi and Yasuyuki Tagawa | Manga | Seinen |
| 2021 | Tengu no Daidokoro | Ai Tanaka | Manga | Seinen |
| 2005 | Teppan Shoujo Akane!! | Takeo Aoki and Hitoshi Ariga | Manga | Seinen |
| 2016 | Today's Menu for the Emiya Family | TAa | Manga | Seinen |
| 2008 | Toriko | Mitsutoshi Shimabukuro | Manga | Shōnen |
| 1970 | Totsugeki Ramen | Mikiya Mochizuki | Manga | Shōnen |
| 2000 | Tsukiji Uogashi Sandaime (The Taste of Fish) | Mitsuo Hashimoto | Manga | Seinen |
| 2011 | Wakakozake (Wakako Sake) | Chie Shinkyu | Manga | Seinen |
| 2018 | Walking Meat | Sublimation | Anime | |
| 2018 | Welcome to the Outcast's Restaurant! | Yūki Kimikawa | Novel | Shōnen |
| 2007 | What Did You Eat Yesterday? | Fumi Yoshinaga | Manga | Seinen |
| 2019 | Witch Hat Atelier Kitchen | Hiromi Sato | Manga | |
| 2002 | Yakitate!! Japan (Freshly Baked!! Japan) | Takashi Hashiguchi | Manga | Shōnen |
| 2015 | Yama to Shokuyoku to Watashi | Hideo Shinanogawa | Manga | |
| 2020 | Yaiteru Futari (How to Grill Our Love) | Shiori Hanatsuka | Manga | Seinen |
| 1987 | Yumeiro Cooking | Riku Kurita | Manga | Shōjo |
| 2008 | Yumeiro Patissiere | Natsumi Matsumoto | Manga | Shōjo |
| 2020 | Zange Meshi | Hatsumi Kodama | Manga | Seinen |
