= Terasawa =

Terasawa (written: 寺沢 or 寺澤) is a Japanese surname. Notable people with the surname include:

- Buichi Terasawa (1955–2023), Japanese manga artist
- Daisuke Terasawa (born 1959) Japanese manga artist
- Junsei Terasawa (born 1950), Japanese Buddhist monk
- Momoka Terasawa, Japanese voice actress
- Toru Terasawa (1935–2025), Japanese long-distance runner

== See also ==
- Terazawa Hirotaka (寺沢広高) (1563–1633), Japanese daimyō of the early Edo period
