= Cooking Papa (volumes 1–100) =

Japanese manga series volumes

Cooking Papa (Japanese: クッキングパパ, Hepburn: Kukkingu Papa) is a Japanese manga series written and illustrated by Tochi Ueyama. It has been serialized in Kodansha's seinen anthology magazine Morning since June 6, 1985. Kodansha has collected it into individual tankōbon volumes and it has a total of 176 volumes as of January 2026, making it one of the longest manga series by number of volumes. The story revolves around the life of Kazumi Araiwa, a salaryman who can cook well and full recipes for the dishes featured in each chapter are provided at the end of the chapter.

The series has been adapted into a 151-episode anime television series of the same name produced by ABC and Eiken, animated by Sunshine Corporation Japan, Trans Arts and Tiger Pro and directed by Toshitaka Tsunoda. The anime series was originally broadcast in Japan on TV Asahi between April 1992 and May 1995, A Japanese television drama adaptation aired on Fuji TV on August 29, 2008.

Cooking Papa won a Special Award at the 39th Kodansha Manga Awards in 2015.

== Volumes ==
No.	Release date	ISBN
1	January 18, 1986	4-06-300004-4
1. "Itarian Naberyouri wa Tegarude Boryuumu Manten" (イタリアン鍋料理は手軽でボリューム満点); 2. "Zangyou Tsukare Niwa Aisukuriimu" (残業疲れにはアイスクリーム); 3. "Tanshinfuninmononi Marugodo Za Karē" (単身赴任者にまるごど・ザ・カレー); 4. "Supeciaru Mōningude Genki Genki!" (スペシャルモーニングで 元気 元気！); 5. "Goukai! Ishidai no Sugatazukuri" (豪快！イシダイの姿造り); 6. "Natsubateyosayounara Sutamina Manten Tokusei Gyōza" (夏バテよさようならスタミナ満点特製ギョーザ); 7. "Tabetemo Tabetemo Futaranai Herushi- Kukkingu" (食べても食べても 太らない ヘルシー・クッキング); 8. "Kaa- to Toushiwaku Mentainorimaki" (カーッと闘志わくメンタイのり巻き); 9. (博多風トン胃ラメンにチャレンジしましょう); 10. (二日酔いにアッサリ雑炊); 11. (子供が喜ぶスイートアップル); 12. (ポットラックパーティー)
2	June 18, 1986	4-06-300005-2
13. (コーヒー好きの人にちょっといいお酒); 14. (寒い冬に雪見鍋); 15. (おもうぞんぶんローストチキンを); 16. (年越しソバを手打ちってみよう); 17. (今密かなプームハヤシもうまいでよ!); 18. (寒い夜はアツアッ茶わん蒸し); 19. (おまけワンホイント・クッキング); 20. (ひと味もふた味も違うバレンタイ・チョコ); 21. (深酒の夜は激ウマフタ汁でふけゆく); 22. (にきり寿司にチャレンジだ!); 23. (本場イタリアのスバケティは"ダンミ・ディ・ピュウ"); 24. (眷一番!栄養満点鯉こく); (わが青春のオムライス)
3	October 18, 1986	4-06-300006-0
25. (春らんまん!! せつない夜のいなり寿司); 26. (なんつっても元気がでるビーフステーキ); 27. (とってもフレッシュ！ まんまるコロッケ); 28. (ケーキを作ろう！); 29. (山に海に どこでも手軽にドボン鍋); 30. (軽～い気分でサンドイッチを作ろう！); 31. (なんでも食べようホイル焼きパーティー); 32. (今が旬 季節を食べよう初ガツオ); 33. (最高の昼メシだぜ！ おかかチャーハン); 34. (この風味がたまんない！ 山菜クッキング); (クッキング・ルポ1 沖縄を食べる！)
4	November 18, 1986	4-06-300007-9
35. (握ってみよう！ いろいろおむすび); 36. (梅雨をふきとばせ カラリッ！ 天ぷら); 37. (兄ちゃんのぶっ飛び卵焼き); 38. (かあちゃんガンバル親子丼); 39. (シーズン突入！ 冷やし中華); 40. (うまいぞ！ 手作りさかなメン); 41. (海の幸がたっぷり！ 冷やしスパゲティ); 42. (夏のおやつにフルーツ春巻き); 43. (夏だ！ 花火だ！ ビールだ！ 焼き鳥だ!!); (クッキング・ルポ2 伊勢エビが食べたい！)
5	February 18, 1987	4-06-300008-7
44. (スタミナ1000パーセント ウナギのかば焼き); 45. (食欲倍増!! カレー焼きうどん); 46. (忙しいあなたに がんばり茶漬け); 47. (スカッとさわやかヤング肉ジャガ); 48. (おいしい秋をたっぷり！ 野菜天ぷら); 49. (秋を食べよう栗ごはん); 50. (豪快にかぶりつこう！ スペアリブ); 51. (みんなで食べよう！ いもち かぼち); 52. (タコ焼き野郎がやってきた!!); 53. (気分はすっかり屋台 あったか～～い おでん); (クッキング・ルポ3 きんしゃい！ 博多へ)
6	May 18, 1987	4-06-300009-5
54. (ごちそうハンバーグを作ろう！); 55. (妻にささげるチーズケーキ); 56. (たのもしいカツ丼を作ろう); 57. (イワシを食べようさつま揚げ); 58. (素敵な香り！ きのこのコキール); 59. (幸せいっぱいハッピーケーキ); 60. (クリスマスにローストビーフ); 61. (鏡開きにぜんざいを作ろう); 62. (うまいぞ！ めでたいぞ！ 丸ごと鯛めし); (クッキング・ルポ4 おいでなはんせ！ 下関へ！); (特別付録・全国読者おすすめクッキング)
7	August 22, 1987	4-06-300010-9
63. (うまいぞ安いぞロールキャベツ); 64. (あったまるぞ！ ブイヤベース); 65. (心の中からあったまるミソ汁を); 66. (パンを作ろう（1） デカメロン); 67. (パンを作ろう（2） 食パンでクロックムッシュー); 68. (甘酒とアジ御飯でアツアツひな祭り); 69. (ピリリッ！ 親父の麻婆豆腐); 70. (春待ちダゴ汁); 71. (お彼岸におはぎ（ぼたもち）を作ろう!!); (クッキング・ルポ5 ニイハオ！ 香港); (特別付録・うえやまとちクッキングライブ)
8	November 21, 1987	4-06-300011-7
72. (オムレツを焼こう!!); 73. (花見は荒岩ちまきでキマリ!!); 74. (入魂の1杯 おいしいコーヒーをいれよう!!); 75. (朝はさっぱり白かゆで); 76. (長崎チャンポンに挑戦!!); 77. (バーベキューを焼こう！); 78. (あつあつ豪華ピザにかぶりつこう!!); 79. (元気がでる鉄火丼); 80. (ジャムを作ろう!!); (クッキング・ルポ6 祝!! 小金ちゃん20周年)
9	February 23, 1988	4-06-300012-5
81. (うまいぞっ!! 野菜いため一丁); 82. (梅干しを漬けよう！); 83. (荒岩おじさんのフライドチキン); 84. (ふんわりふんわりシュークリーム); 85. (梅雨の晴れ間のかしわめし); 86. (磯の香り ヒジキのフルコース); 87. (天下一品タンシチュー); 88. (真夏の昼のすき焼き); 89. (豪快!! 鯉の丸揚げ あんかけスゴイ); (クッキング・ルポ7 梅宮さんのキムチ汁)
10	May 23, 1988	4-06-300013-3
90. (日本の夏だっ!! うどん); 91. (夏バテふき飛ぶ手巻き寿司!!); 92. (夏さわやか スイカ丸ごとシャーベット); 93. (軽く安くあげよう！ ミックスフライ); 94. (さなえサバラン); 95. (田中くんの恋（前編） めでたいぜっ！ 赤飯!!); 96. (田中くんの恋（後編） 哀愁のビーフストロガ"ナス"); 97. (カボチャ野郎に乾杯!!); 98. (みんなのおやつ 大学イモ!!); 99. (まつたけや ああ まつたけや まつたけ丼); 100. (サンマの飯（まんま）)
11	August 23, 1988	4-06-300036-2
101. (塩辛を作ろう!!); 102. (やったね 田中くん！ ブリの照り焼き); 103. (スポーツのあとに甘～～い 大ドラ焼き); 104. (泳げ!! 塩のタイヤキくん); 105. (元気がでる ポパイシチュー); 106. (巻いて巻いて お好みバー); 107. (うまかばいっ!! 博多がめ煮); 108. (残ったごはんで おにぎりコロッケ); 109. (大鍋かこんで ポーチドエッグ); 110. (みんなでワイワイ チョコフォンデュ)
12	November 22, 1988	4-06-300037-0
111. (ふんわり しっとり 手作りカステラ); 112. (今年もよろしく ペッタンピザ); 113. (きんちゃく鍋であったまろう!!); 114. (うまいぞ!! うまイカライス); 115. (あったか肉まん); 116. (バレンタインのお返しに チョコドーナツ); 117. (レバーを食べよう!!); 118. (天下一品 牛どん!!); 119. (かわいいぞ!! 雪いちご); 120. (ボンゴレ！ 荒岩 ガンバレ！ 田中)
13	February 23, 1989	4-06-300038-9
121. (ホンコン風白身魚のムシバチ); 122. (はんごうごはんを炊こう!!); 123. (春を満喫！ 桜もち〈田中くんのお見合い その1〉); 124. (ハッピーなパリパリ焼きそば〈田中くんのお見合い その2〉); 125. (やさしい味 ホットケーキ〈田中くんのお見合い その3〉); 126. (焼き肉しようぜ!!); 127. (思い出のおきゅうと〈さらば！ 梅田くん 歓迎！ 種ヶ島さん その1〉); 128. (魚の一夜干しを作ろう!!〈さらば！ 梅田くん 歓迎！ 種ヶ島さん その2〉); 129. (政さんのアスパラガス); 130. (中年四銃士のチェリータルト)
14	May 23, 1989	4-06-300039-7
131. (庶民の味!! メンチカツ〈ヨーロッパ出張編 その1〉); 132. (日本の味 冷や汁(ひやしゅる)〈ヨーロッパ出張編 その2〉); 133. (パリの夏 ビシソワーズがうまい!!〈ヨーロッパ満足満腹食の旅 パリその1〉); 134. (メルシーチキンでホームパーティー〈ヨーロッパ満足満腹食の旅 パリその2〉); 135. (ベニスの味 オムレツのパニーノ〈ヨーロッパ満足満腹食の旅 ベニスその1〉); 136. (幸せいっぱい！ ピーチ・ロマンス〈ヨーロッパ満足満腹食の旅 ベニスその2〉); 137. (絶品!! スパゲティブラック〈ヨーロッパ満足満腹食の旅 ローマその1〉); 138. (さわやかな レモンのリゾット〈ヨーロッパ満足満腹食の旅 ローマその1〉); 139. (さらばヨーロッパ！ 白身魚のムニエル〈ヨーロッパ満足満腹食の旅 パリその3〉); 140. (パリのおみやげ ソルティ・クレープ〈ヨーロッパ満足満腹食の旅 思い出編〉)
15	Aug 21, 1989	978-4-06-300040-5
141. (とうちゃんの南蛮漬け); 142. (とうふを作ろう!!); 143. (おいしいクッパで疲労回復!!); 144. (健康を食べよう!! 玄米とイワシの味噌煮); 145. (いなかパイはいかが!?); 146. (甘くてやわらか～～い ブタ角煮); 147. (引っ越し焼きそばで乾杯!!); 148. (満腹!! さつまコロッケ(&かりんとう)); 149. (とびっきりのうまさ!! もやしの味噌汁); 150. (バリバリ営業マンの昼食 かけあげ天丼)
16	November 20, 1989	978-4-06-300041-2
151. (ボリューム満点!! パーコーめん); 152. (田中サンサンド); 153. (豪華!! パエリア); 154. (手巻きケーキでメリークリスマス); 155. (あけましてポークソテーでございます); 156. (チーズフォンデュで一晩中); 157. (華麗なる納豆野郎); 158. (超スピード料理ニラとじ丼!!); 159. (心にしみるうまさ丸天丼); 160. (愛情大盛りぶっかけ丼!!)
17	February 21, 1990	978-4-06-300042-9
161. (ホットひと息ハッピーボール); 162. (みんな大好きカレーパン); 163. (春を呼ぶきんなごずし); 164. (春のしあわせポカポカ鍋); 165. (春の海の恵みあさりめし); 166. (気分さわやかあんにんどうふ); 167. (サッパリ春のサラダそうめん); 168. (とびっきりのごちそうペチキン!!); 169. (激うまのエビチリソース); 170. (トンピカル酢豚パーティーしようぜっ!!)
18	May 21, 1990	978-4-06-300043-6
171. (笑う揚げダンゴ); 172. (なかよしチキンプイプイ); 173. (愛する妻へレバーのパテ); 174. (甘さ涼しく水ようかん); 175. (カラリッ!! さわやかドライカレー); 176. (さわやか ベラのミソたたき&背切り); 177. (元気を出して!! 博多モツ鍋); 178. (がんばった人にはごちそうエビフライ!!); 179. (虹子さんのクリスタル・ボール); 180. (夏本番スープビーフンがうまいっ!!); 181. (スペシャル虹子クッキング 第2弾 だしスパ)
19	August 21, 1990	978-4-06-300079-5
182. (やってみるもんだっ！ そば焼き); 183. (ユニークカレー第1弾 メッタメタうまいどすこいカレー); 184. (ユニークカレー第2弾 アウトドアに炊きこみカレー); 185. (ユニークカレー第3弾 華麗なるカレー大漁カレー); 186. (みんな大好きおいもさん!!); 187. (収穫の喜び なすびのフルコース); 188. (元気を出して!! からし"めん"こん); 189. (おつだねっ!! カツオギョーザ); 190. (みんなでワイワイ作ろうっ!! 手作りソーセージ); 191. (まるごと食べよう煮付け丼); (特別付録・全国読者おすすめクッキング)
20	November 19, 1990	978-4-06-300084-9
192. (秋の行楽にきんぴら弁当); 193. (ふるさとの味 郷愁のギョロッケ); 194. (スペシャル 虹子クッキングいそぎんちゃん); 195. (しみじみと男同士の九州鍋); 196. (あっさり どっさり つみれ鍋); 197. (バリうまいっ!! さしつけ鍋); 198. (豆がおいしいジャンバラビーンズ); 199. (みんなで食べよう サンマのゴロゴロめし); 200. (クリスマスにペア（西洋梨）ケーキはいかが!?); 201. (ウマいぞ!! カンタンタン); (特別付録・全国読者おすすめクッキング)
21	February 21, 1991	978-4-06-300086-3
202. (若い2人にサバの酒蒸し); 203. (多忙な日々の中華丼); 204. (感謝感謝のおめでたバーガー); 205. (大平課長のめんたいチキン); 206. (ついに来た韓国!! まずは本格派キムチを作るぞ！); 207. (キムチ応用編 キムチポックンパ&トゥブキムチ); 208. (うまいぞ!! 韓国のごちそう参鶏湯); 209. (韓国風鉄火丼はいかが); 210. (巻いて包んでクジョルパン); 211. (さらば韓国 パヂョンで乾杯!!)
22	May 20, 1991	978-4-06-300089-4
212. (韓国のおみやげニンニクチキン); 213. (超簡単おにぎり おにぎらず); 214. (傑作はっさくパパレード); 215. (あっさり上品あさり丼); 216. (本場韓国式焼き肉しようぜ カルビクイ); 217. (阿蘇の味たかなライス); 218. (ゆっくり休日にビーフシチュー); 219. (大人にも子供にも野菜スープ); 220. (お酒にピッタリいりおから); 221. (料理は楽し!! あげたま丼); (特別付録・全国読者おすすめクッキング)
23	August 21, 1991	978-4-06-300092-4
222. (みんなで作ろう だぶ); 223. (夏の超簡単ばりうま鍋 にくにらしゃぶ); 224. (なつかしい味 炒り米); 225. (元気が出る ねばとろ丼); 226. (作って楽しいインドサンド); 227. (うまいぞ!! うまき); 228. (焼き肉の横綱ドネル・ケバブ（がんばれ！ 相撲大会 前編）); 229. (暑さ うっちゃりフルーツパンチ（がんばれ！ 相撲大会 後編）); 230. (夏 さっぱり!! 冷やしラーメン); 231. (夏を食べよう!! 太刀魚のフルコース); (特別付録・全国読者おすすめクッキング)
24	November 20, 1991	978-4-06-300096-2
232. (去りゆく夏のイチジクのコンポート); 233. (さっぱりすっきりさらさら); 234. (みんなそろって肉だんご); 235. (味覚の秋!! サバミソがうまいっ); 236. (おいしさ丸ごとカボチャを食べよう); 237. (ピンチを救うメザシのパパカリ); 238. (秋のごちそうサンマのカバ焼き丼); 239. (作ってうれしいアップルパイ); 240. (うまさ やみつき!! コブスパ); 241. (うまさ あふれるアジ三昧); (特別付録・全国読者おすすめクッキング)
25	January 20, 1992	978-4-06-300101-3
242. (おいしさ ビックリ!! フルーツご飯); 243. (思い出のスペイン・オムレツ); 244. (ハッピーミートローフ); 245. (荒岩 喜ぶ きのこ鍋); 246. (ぐーたら作れる ぐーたらおでん); 247. (クリスマスにチャイナ・チキン); 248. (荒岩流！ 家でもちをつこう!!); 249. (鍋の王様 あんこう鍋); 250. (しあわせ ふくらむ 黒糖まんじゅう); 251. (哀愁のゴマダレうどん)
26	April 21, 1992	978-4-06-300106-8
252. (気分はもう東南アジア エスニック春巻き); 253. (本格派スープ!! まもるチャウダー); 254. (愛情たっぷり おそうざいフルコース); 255. (楽しいぞっ!! コロッケ大変身); 256. (驚きのうまさ!! ボンゴレラーメン); 257. (ふんわりおいしい荒岩流お好み焼き); 258. (みそタンでカンパイ!!); 259. (しみじみおいしい ご汁); 260. (春のごちそうウニめし); 261. (キャベツを食べよう); (特別付録・全国読者おすすめクッキング)
27	July 20, 1992	978-4-06-300110-5
262. (手作りキャラメルに挑戦!!); 263. (丸ごと鯛クッキング); 264. (日本の味!! 葉わさびのショウユ漬け); 265. (やる気満々 ぶっ玉丼); 266. (手間いらず 水いらず いきなりトリ鍋); 267. (中身いろいろ ころころタコヤキ); 268. (さわやかに辛い カレービーフン); 269. (今夜はほろ酔い らっきょう気分); 270. (本格派!! スパゲティミートソース); 271. (いろいろあるぞ!! 枝豆クッキング); (特別付録・全国読者おすすめクッキング)
28	August 20, 1992	978-4-06-300111-2
272. (夏の夜のとうがんスープ); 273. (夏のおもてなし冷やしゃぶ); 274. (ニクイカ・トロイカ・ヤサイカはいかが!?); 275. (ふっくらおいしいホタテご飯（うまさでっかい北海道 前編）); 276. (北の海からタコしゃぶ（うまさでっかい北海道 後編）); 277. (コンブとカツオブシの得クッキング（北海道 おみやげ編）); 278. (カンパンを作ろう!!); 279. (おもしろ和風スパ ア・ラ・カルト); 280. (鯛を食うなら茶漬けたい!!); 281. (しみじみいろいろ手作り豆腐); (特別付録・全国読者おすすめクッキング)
29	November 17, 1992	978-4-06-300116-7
282. (ほくほくピカタで元気いっぱい!!); 283. (荒岩流特製弁当でパワーアップ!!); 284. (気分すっきりジン茶&バナ天); 285. (アフタースポーツに ちゃんちゃんパーティーはいかが!?); 286. (愛情たっぷりモンブラン); 287. (みんなが待ってるビーフジャーキー); 288. (懐かしのうす焼き); 289. (とってもおいしい鯛ラーメン); 290. (あったまる～～～っ!! ギョーザ鍋); 291. (パーティー料理の決定版!! ラム・クラウン・ロースト)
30	February 19, 1993	978-4-06-300121-1
292. (心もポカポカ梅が枝もち); 293. (冬の味覚の王様カキ三昧はいかが？); 294. (犬も歩けばポトフでニッコリ); 295. (たまらなくおいしい手作りかまぼこ・ちくわ); 296. (寒い夜にはアツアツのオニオングラタンスープ); 297. (パッピーなカカオのカクテルはいかが？); 298. (雪山に白いスープの水炊きはいかが？); 299. (ナニがナニの時のとろろフォンデュ); 300. (ダイナミックな鶏モツ鍋); 301. (えっちゃんの愛情シューマイ); (特別付録・単行本1～30巻収録料理メニュー一覧表)
31	May 20, 1993	978-4-06-300125-9
302. (ホンモノの味 天然酵母パン); 303. (甘く やさしいミルフィーユ); 304. (うまさでっかいスーパークリームシチュー); 305. (長崎のユニーク満腹メニュー トルコ風ライス); 306. (幸せいっぱいエビちらし寿司); 307. (かごんまの味 酒寿司); 308. (いなかの味 高菜巻き); 309. (元気100倍豆料理チリコンカーン); 310. (超簡単スピード料理 のり巻き卵はいかが？); 311. (金丸産業のお元気レディーけいこちゃんのダイナミックチンジャオ"ハム"スー)
32	August 20, 1993	978-4-06-300129-7
312. (ジュワ～～～ッとおいしいおこげのスープ); 313. (荒岩流 激辛グリーンカレーはいかが？); 314. (やさし～い味おそば屋さんのカツカレー丼); 315. (兄貴のミソカレー); 316. (白夜のあったかミネストラーメン); 317. (ダイナミック！ ドラゴン・エッグ!!); 318. (乾杯 アラスカ!! カクテルをつくろう！); 319. (おみやげキングサーモン クッキング！); 320. (お好み焼きみたいな おのこり焼き); 321. (うまいぞ!! ダイエット冷メン); (特別付録 / うえやまとちのアラスカ キングサーモン・フィッシング ルポ)
33	November 19, 1993	978-4-06-300132-7
322. (楽しいぞ!! 台湾風カキ氷); 323. (うまさ かみしめて さしみそ!! （南海孤島編 前編）); 324. (しみじみうまい カッパ焼き!! （南海孤島編 後編）); 325. (思い出はこぶステーキソース); 326. (ぜいたくバッテラ巻き); 327. (懐かしい 水アメ); 328. (おいしい おいしい おいしいケジャン); 329. (今日はごちそう鴨のオレンジソース); 330. (おばあちゃんのクリ・イモ・トリ煮); 331. (えっちゃんのふかふかムシツメパン!!); (特別付録 / うえやまとちの口永良部島はパラダイス!!)
34	February 21, 1994	978-4-06-300133-4
332. (秋の味覚ハゼのから揚げ・天プラ); 333. (きんしゃい屋名物ドテ煮込み); 334. (楽しくつくろうワンタン！); 335. (麗しのケーキ オペラ（わが青春のお菓子特集 第1弾）); 336. (心安まるオヤツ 甘食（わが青春のお菓子特集 第2弾）); 337. (おふくろさんの思い出 豆大福（わが青春のお菓子特集 第3弾）); 338. (元気いっぱいキムチドリア); 339. (元気の源ぬかみそ炊き); 340. (かす汁で体も心もポッカポカ); 341. (簡単にできるごちそう牛のたたき)
35	May 20, 1994	978-4-06-300136-5
342. (バレンタインにふんわりチョコレートケーキ); 343. (楽しいぞ!! みつぐラーメン); 344. (早春の菜の花チャーハン); 345. (じ～～～んわりおいしい おばあチャーハン); 346. (おかしなふたりのトロトロチャーハン); 347. (ユニークだんごで花見をしよう!!); 348. (豪華！ 丸ごとあわびめし); 349. (今が旬!! 桜鯛のチャイナサラダ); 350. (探したぜ!! チキンナンバン); 351. (旬の味!! カツオ丸ごとクッキング); 352. (飲んで騒いでパンプディング!!); (特別付録 / スタッフが選んだクッキングパパメニューベスト3)
36	August 19, 1994	978-4-06-300139-6
353. (ここ一発の5色ライス!!); 354. (ふたりのカツそば); 355. (アフタヌーンティーはいかが？ （初夏のさわやかドリンク特集 第1弾）); 356. (おいしく健康 いろいろフレッシュセーキ（初夏のさわやかドリンク特集 第2弾）); 357. (不思議な松葉のサイダー&ジンジャエール（初夏のさわやかドリンク特集 第3弾）); 358. (大好き!! 卵かけごはん); 359. (できたてがうまい!! オニオンゼリー&コーヒーゼリー); 360. (情熱のスコッチーズエッグ（ひき肉料理特集 第1弾）); 361. (いろいろおもしろハンバーグを作ろう!! （ひき肉料理特集 第2弾）); 362. (夢ちゃんの愛情たっぷりウナバーグ（ひき肉料理特集 第3弾）)
37	November 18, 1994	978-4-06-300141-9
363. (猛暑ふき飛ばすガスパッチョーメン); 364. (鍋の中は海!! 海水クッキング); 365. (大人のゼリーでカンパーイ!!); 366. (男の休日 かき揚げ天茶漬け); 367. (やれやれみつぐのゴキゲンカレー); 368. (大学イモが大変身!! 大学フルーツごった); 369. (全力投球!! まもるのミソスキ（ふたりの夢 前編）); 370. (守とひとみのとんてん丼（ふたりの夢 後編）); 371. (ほっぺた落ちるサンマの寿司); 372. (しみじみうまい鴨南丼); (特別付録 / うえやまとちプロの休日)
38	January 20, 1995	978-4-06-300142-6
373. (田中がんばる"よかにせ"ハム); 374. (しみじみおいしい さつま汁); 375. (やさしく甘い きんつば); 376. (わんぱくボウズのレッグ・ネック・チキン); 377. (ワイワイ夜食にトンソクおでん); 378. (みんなで作ったウエディング"ドラ"ケーキ); 379. (ハッピーなふたりにおめでたラビオリ); 380. (虹子さんのスシフライ); 381. (本格派!! そばに挑戦！); 382. (心ポカポカ フルーツグラタン)
39	March 20, 1995	978-4-06-300145-7
383. (荒岩流 新巻きざけクッキング); 384. (ほのぼのうまいカンコロモチ); 385. (中華風ソーセージでパーティーしよう!!); 386. (冬のデザート スゥジョンクワ&柿天（食べて遊んで宮崎をゆく 前編）); 387. (しみじみ宮崎の味 そば汁（食べて遊んで宮崎をゆく 後編）); 388. (みつぐがんばるスープハンバーグ); 389. (おかしごはんで笑っちゃおうっ!!); 390. (夢のジャーマン・オムレツ・ライス); 391. (天国からのマドレーヌ); 392. (出世魚チヌの香草焼き)
40	May 22, 1995	978-4-06-300147-1
393. (とろ～～～り納豆汁（雪国で出会ったごっつぉ 前編）); 394. (天下一品 ブリ大根（雪国で出会ったごっつぉ 後編）); 395. (手前ミソを作ろう!!); 396. (グッバイ マイ ラブ他人丼); 397. (岡山名物ドミカツ丼を作ってみよう!!); 398. (ノンポリパパのきつね丼); 399. (おかしな おかしな おかしな丼を作ろう!!); 400. (ショウガ焼きうどんでがんばって!!); 401. (愛情たっぷりトリカワギョーザ); (特別付録・うえやまとちの40巻ですバイ!!)
41	July 19, 1995	978-4-06-300149-5
402. (暑さスッキリ ライス・キャンディー); 403. (熱帯ヤキソバでいってらっしゃーーーい); 404. (暑い国のアツアツめん・フォーを食べよう!!); 405. (ベトナム一番のおごちそうゴイクォンを食べよう!!); 406. (ベトナム庶民の味バインセオとカインチュア); 407. (懐かしいタイの味トムヤムクン); 408. (タイのカレーを冷や麦で); 409. (カ～～～ッと燃えてタイ風ラーメン); 410. (元気モリモリ シンガポールのチキンライス); 411. (東南アジアからの辛～～～いおみやげ)
42	October 20, 1995	978-4-06-300152-5
412. (な～～～んでもカナッペ); 413. (飲んだあとの"シメめし"いろいろ); 414. (サンマのシャレトローガ!!); 415. (スパゲティマツタケソースはいかが？); 416. (まさかのムサカ); 417. (秋を包んで栗まんじゅう); 418. (キミに贈りたいブドウクッキング); 419. (しみじみシジミ漬け); 420. (田中兄ちゃんのトリレバーグ); 421. (どすこい!! 塩味チャンコ)
43	January 20, 1996	978-4-06-300156-3
422. (ゆっくり ゆっくりクロワッサン); 423. (カンビールライスで乾杯!!); 424. (クリスマスにフルーツケーキ); 425. (オヤジのトリスキ（鍋特集第1弾）); 426. (あったか～～～いカキのどて鍋（鍋特集第2弾）); 427. (からだポカポカ韓国風ポッポチゲ（鍋特集第3弾）); 428. (ミノムシパーティーしようぜ!!); 429. (兄ちゃんのコーンスープ); 430. (1週間後のお楽しみコーン・ポーク); 431. (ふたりのエクレア)
44	April 20, 1996	978-4-06-300160-0
432. (あったま～～～る おにぎり雑炊); 433. (ボクたちのきびなご柳川鍋); 434. (しっとりおいしい鰆の西京揚げ（春の海からの恵み特集第1弾）); 435. (サザエのエスカルゴ風（春の海からの恵み特集第2弾）); 436. (春いっぱいのちらし寿司（春の海からの恵み特集第3弾）); 437. (おいしいぞ!! カメノテクッキング（春の海からの恵み特集第4弾）); 438. (香り豊かなセリご飯); 439. (女三代よもぎもち); 440. (懐かしい おふくろサラダ); 441. (楽しいぞ!! タピオカクッキング)
45	July 19, 1996	978-4-06-300165-5
442. (でっかい愛のアジフライ（一味と虹子のふたり旅1）); 443. (すばらしい朝のパンケーキ（一味と虹子のふたり旅2）); 444. (ヤンママが教えてくれた大分の味・トリテン（一味と虹子のふたり旅3）); 445. (あったか～～～い大分名物 だんご汁（一味と虹子のふたり旅4）); 446. (アツイ男のラタトゥイユ); 447. (初夏のさわやか青梅クッキング); 448. (オシャレな中華デザート ゴマダンゴ); 449. (幸せの中華風ウナギのうま煮); 450. (本格冷めんでおめでとう!!); 451. (夏だ！ カレーだ！ ムスイカレー!!); (取材旅行こぼれ話 大好き、なつかしき別府)
46	October 21, 1996	978-4-06-300174-7
452. (夏にすっきりしゃっきり しるかえ); 453. (心落ち着くスペシャルコーヒー); 454. (祝!! 八宝飯); 455. (おめでたいご鯛麺!!); 456. (行ってきま～～～すの鯵の柿の葉焼き); 457. (オシャレな朝食コーンフレーク); 458. (とうちゃんの夜鳴きラーメン); 459. (ジュワ～～～ッと焼け石鍋!!); 460. (おいし～～～い冷やご飯クッキング)
47	January 21, 1997	978-4-06-300179-2
461. (本格派!! マツタケのどびん蒸し); 462. (おじいちゃんたちのパンプキッシュ); 463. (いっぱい遊ぼうフレンチトースト); 464. (笑顔で食べる回鍋肉); 465. (家族みんなで かぶら蒸し); 466. (おいしさぜ～～～んぶ鯛のかぶと揚げ); 467. (じっくり じっくり本格生ハム); 468. (バウムクーヘンでクリスマス!!); 469. (花びらもちでありがとう!!)
48	April 21, 1997	978-4-06-300184-6
470. (おばあちゃんの みつ豆); 471. (旅立て花田！ イワシのスパゲティ); 472. (ふぐ天丼で再会!!); 473. (たったひとりのミルクスープ); 474. (コムタンであったまれー!!); 475. (三平のサクサクチョコサッキー); 476. (家族そろってタンタンメン); 477. (ステキなふたり2のチャーハン蒸し); 478. (ココットでひな祭り); 479. (うれしさふくらむスナックスフレ); (特別付録 うえやまとちの写真でクッキング!!)
49	July 19, 1997	978-4-06-300189-1
480. (ポカポカ 春のゆば鍋); 481. (パパからのクレープシュゼット); 482. (うまいぞ!! 手作りみりん干し); 483. (幸せを呼ぶシャリアピン ポークステーキ); 484. (春の山菜おこわ); 485. (懐かしきドロップ); 486. (夢見る想いのカツサンド); 487. (春を食べよう アワビとタケノコの中華風炒め); 488. (友情のフェットチーネ); 489. (酔鶏でおもてなし); (特別付録 うえやまとちの写真でクッキング!!)
50	October 21, 1997	978-4-06-300193-8
490. (ゆっくり休もうダックワーズ); 491. (緑豊かな柿の若葉クッキング); 492. (アメリカ人もビックリ ゴボウ天うどん); 493. (冷た～～～く冷やして わらびもち); 494. (アユそばで梅雨をぶっとばせ!! （夏の魚特集1）); 495. (あなごクッキング（夏の魚特集2）); 496. (天下一品!! かわはぎクッキング（夏の魚特集3）); 497. (フィッシュ・スティックでビールがうまい!! （夏の魚特集4）); 498. (パスタを作ろう2 穴があったらマカロニ!!); 499. (怒れる男のナンテコッタ!!); (特別付録 1～50巻収録メニュー一覧表)
51	January 21, 1998	978-4-06-300196-9
500. (アドボで元気！); 501. (愛情たっぷり栄養満点カボチャクッキング); 502. (パスタを作ろう3 幸せのクルリン); 503. (さっぱりおいしいミックスピクルス); 504. (ビールで乾杯!!); 505. (秋が香るナスビの田楽); 506. (しみじみうまい かるかん); 507. (愛情丸ごとカレイのスープ（スープ特集1）); 508. (最高のぜいたくコンソメスープ（スープ特集2）); 509. (本格中華フカヒレスープにチャレンジ!!（スープ特集3）); (特別付録 うえやまとちの写真でクッキング)
52	April 21, 1998	978-4-06-300197-6
510. (イヤッホーーーッ!! 納豆カレー); 511. (恋のアツアツ スイートポテト); 512. (それぞれの鴨鍋で乾杯!!); 513. (スモークサーモンを作ろう!!（クリスマスクッキング第1弾）); 514. (ターキーでオレたちのパーティー（クリスマスクッキング第2弾）); 515. (エビのおせちでありがとう!!); 516. (ラーメン鍋パーティーしようぜ!!（極貧料理特集第1弾）); 517. (おやつ感覚でレバカツ!!（極貧料理特集第2弾）); 518. (あったまる～～～!! ジャガダゴスープ（極貧料理特集第3弾）); 519. (夢のケーキパン（極貧料理特集第4弾）); (特別付録 うえやまとちの写真でクッキング)
53	July 21, 1998	978-4-06-300201-0
520. (大将のあったかおこわ（守とひとみ、広島旅行 前編）); 521. (ふたりのおこめの焼き（守とひとみ、広島旅行 後編）); 522. (作ってうれしい中華クッキー); 523. (ふわふわおいしい"ばそ鍋"); 524. (元気を出してタンカツ); 525. (恩師にスジ大根); 526. (ブルータスサラダで元気百倍!!（サラダ特集第1弾）); 527. (ジャパニーズ・トラディショナル・サラダ なます（サラダ特集第2弾）); 528. (修一とマイのアメリカンサラダ（サラダ特集第3弾）); 529. (おばあちゃんのいなりめん); (特別付録 うえやまとちの写真でクッキング)
54	October 20, 1998	978-4-06-300205-8
530. (とびっきりのアワビスープ); 531. (びっくり!! コンビニライス); 532. (ミモザケーキ（ふんわりやさしいケーキ特集第1弾）); 533. (シフォンケーキ（ふんわりやさしいケーキ特集第2弾）); 534. (ピーチのババロアケーキ（ふんわりやさしいケーキ特集第3弾）); 535. (ペッタンチキン（豪華肉料理特集第1弾）); 536. (リブ・ローストにかぶりつこう!!（豪華肉料理特集第2弾）); 537. (豪快 マグロのカブト煮!!); 538. (フルーツローストビーフでおめでとう!!); 539. (兄ちゃんのヤキトリパーティー)
55	January 20, 1999	978-4-06-300207-2
540. (甘くやさしいソフトクリーム); 541. (オコゼをさばいてみよう!!); 542. (友情のスズキのアライ); 543. (タコで勝負!!); 544. (懐かしの豚バラカレー); 545. (笑顔を呼ぶアイスぜんざいめん); 546. (夏を乗り切れ！ ゴーヤーチャンプル); 547. (夏よさらば!! スイカの皮クッキング); 548. (食欲の秋！ 焼きおにぎりの秋!!)
56	April 19, 1999	978-4-06-300210-2
549. (手づかみでお魚パン); 550. (秋だ！ うまいぞ!! マロンワッフル); 551. (ラフティーでちばりよーーーっ!!); 552. (バリバリいこう!! ショウユせんべい); 553. (オトナの味サラミで乾杯!!); 554. (手巻きコロネパーティーしようぜ!!); 555. (パワーみなぎるサムギョプサル); 556. (韓国粥（チュック）でケンチャナヨ!!); 557. (日本のポカポカ料理 鍋焼きうどん); (特別付録 うえやまとちの写真でクッキング)
57	July 19, 1999	978-4-06-300212-6
558. (さわやかに辛いピビンスパゲティ); 559. (夢のザッハートルテ); 560. (ホッカホカスタミナ水ギョーザ); 561. (にくもちで力持ち!!); 562. (しぶーい男のチーズチキン); 563. (がんばる人にあったかにゅうめん); 564. (疲れたノドにキンカンクッキング); 565. (スばはいかが？); 566. (バレンタインにホットチョコケーキ)
58	October 20, 1999	978-4-06-300214-0
567. (白菜を漬けよう); 568. (豪華なホタテサラダ（春の貝特集第1弾）); 569. (ハマグリの潮汁&卵蒸し（春の貝特集第2弾）); 570. (マテ貝クッキング（春の貝特集第3弾）); 571. (元気いっぱい雑穀おこわ); 572. (ビール野郎にザワークラウト); 573. (甘くやさしいフレーズ・ロマノフ); 574. (みんなで楽しくエッグシチュー); 575. (レモンステーキでがんばろう！); (特別付録 うえやまとちの写真でクッキング)
59	January 19, 2000	978-4-06-300217-1
576. (島田さんのカツオのユッケ); 577. (博多発 B級グルメ決定版！ かしわうどん); 578. (頭イキイキ黒髪クッキング); 579. (恋のタンドリーチキン); 580. (おからのクッキーでハッピー・ウエディング); 581. (即席ラーメンを作ってみよう!!); 582. (さわやかに辛い ピリ辛春雨豆腐); 583. (フレッシュカクテルでリフレッシュ!!); 584. (あまい香りのバジルペースト); (特別付録 うえやまとちの写真でクッキング)
60	April 19, 2000	978-4-06-300220-1
585. (栄養満点・元気百倍 沖縄のミソ汁（沖縄編 前編）); 586. (夏のヘルシースープ イカスミ汁（沖縄編 後編）); 587. (でっかいうまさ!! 丸ごと豚足（沖縄おみやげ編）); 588. (かんぴょう冷麺でお疲れさん!!); 589. (達人の昼めし カツオの頭のタタキ); 590. (しっとりおいしい切り干し大根のオムレツ); 591. (黄金の味 手作りケチャップ); 592. (豪華!! マツタケのピザ（秋のピザ特集1）); 593. (笑顔で食べよう！ 洋なしのピザ（秋のピザ特集2）); 594. (包みピザ（秋のピザ特集3）); (特別付録 とうとう60巻ですバイ!!)
61	July 18, 2000	978-4-06-300221-8
595. (メロンスープで夏満喫!!); 596. (ニンニククッキング（元気ビンビン料理特集1）); 597. (スッポンを食べよう!!（元気ビンビン料理特集2）); 598. (烏骨鶏スープ（元気ビンビン料理特集3）); 599. (ピリッと利くゆずごしょう); 600. (アメリカンチーズケーキでおめでとう); 601. (きのこのスープでホッカホカ); 602. (カブとホタテの東京カブストーリー); 603. (想いははるかマンハッタン); (特別付録 うえやまとちの写真でクッキング)
62	October 20, 2000	978-4-06-300224-9
604. (ニューヨークでステーキを!!（ニューヨーク編第1弾）); 605. (リングィーネで乾杯!!（ニューヨーク編第2弾）); 606. (ライスプディングでドガチャガチャ（ニューヨーク編第3弾）); 607. (恩師のシイタケのポタージュスープ（ニューヨーク編第4弾）); 608. (ソウルフードチリング（ニューヨーク編第5弾）); 609. (あったまる～～～!! ニンニクのスープ); 610. (N・Yのおみやげ クレームブリュレ); 611. (頓田課長のリエット); 612. (ホワイトデーにスノーボール); (特別付録 「ニューヨークに行ってきましたバイ!!」)
63	January 20, 2001	978-4-06-300226-3
613. (アンチョビを作ってみよう!!); 614. (すくすく伸びろアゲマメパン); 615. (クルクルクレープでおめでとう!!); 616. (みんな仲良くイロイロゆで卵); 617. (オレたちの親子丼（超簡単料理特集1）); 618. (おもしろトーストを作ろう!!（超簡単料理特集2）); 619. (変身カップメンじゃ～～～!!（超簡単料理特集3）); 620. (大人のチャーハン ナシゴレン); 621. (元気でめでたいBIGライスケーキ); 622. (お魚ギョーザで丸ごとOK!!); (特別付録 うえやまとちの写真でクッキング)
64	April 20, 2001	978-4-06-300228-7
623. (ホクホク!! 新肉ジャガ); 624. (欲張りエービーフライ); 625. (初夏の香りスナックえんどうクッキング); 626. (夏のデザート フルーツブラマンジェ); 627. (暑さふきとぶ棒々鶏冷？（夏の中華特集第1弾）); 628. (うまい 早い 簡単!! ナスと豚肉の炒め物（夏の中華特集第2弾）); 629. (あたし作っちゃったーーー!! 干しアワビのうま煮（夏の中華特集第3弾）); 630. (カツ代とみゆきのマンゴープリン（夏の中華特集第4弾）); 631. (この夏 地中海風バーベキューはいかが？); 632. (懐かしい鯨のカレー)
65	July 19, 2001	978-4-06-300232-4
633. (忘れじのスナック天プラ); 634. (どうだっ！ これぞ若か者そば!!); 635. (月餅を作ってみよう!!); 636. (カボチャのニョッキで元気ニョキニョキ!?); 637. (スコーンと一発やってみようよ!!); 638. (巻いて巻いてゴボウ巻き（秋のおいしい根野菜特集1）"ゴボウ"その1); 639. (おいしいそばをゴボウで!?（秋のおいしい根野菜特集2）"ゴボウ"その2); 640. (レンコンのポタージュはおいしいぞー!!（秋のおいしい根野菜特集3）); 641. (ホックリ!! 里芋クッキング（秋のおいしい根野菜特集4）)
66	October 20, 2001	978-4-06-300234-8
642. (あこがれのきりたんぽ鍋); 643. (うれしさ伝えてマカロン); 644. (栄養満点!! ホウレン草カレー); 645. (ふたりのきびなご鍋（さらば!! 大平課長〈前編〉）); 646. (最後の夜は"おしあわせ"で（さらば!! 大平課長〈後編〉）); 647. (気合を入れてクリスマス・プディング); 648. (こってりうまいトンコツ鍋（冬のあったか鍋特集1）); 649. (早い！ 簡単！ うまい！ ネギマ鍋（冬のあったか鍋特集2）); 650. (虹子さんのスペシャル"おだん"（冬のあったか鍋特集3）); 651. (ジャパニーズフレッシュカクテルはいかが!?); (特別付録 うえやまとちの写真でクッキング)
67	January 21, 2002	978-4-06-300237-9
652. (アツアツ小籠包でみんなポカポカ); 653. (アツアツなふたりにカキのグラタン&ラーメン); 654. (大平さんたちのバレンタイン); 655. (日本のお惣菜イワシの佃煮); 656. (おいしかった我が家の佃煮); 657. (涙の塩ラーメン（あったかラーメン特集1）); 658. (みそラーメン&メンを打ってみよう（あったかラーメン特集2）); 659. (こってり さっぱりテール・ラーメン（あったかラーメン特集3）); 660. (懐かしのザボン漬け)
68	April 20, 2002	978-4-06-300243-0
661. (心ウキウキ ベジタブルパイ); 662. (すくすく伸びろ竹の子クッキング); 663. (つくしの卵とじDXはいかが); 664. (素朴でおいし～～～い ろくべえ（島原 女ふたり旅 前編）); 665. (ごちソーメンで がまだそう（島原 女ふたり旅 後編）); 666. (みんなでワイワイ シシカバブ!!); 667. (雑魚がおいしい とんぼめし（おいしいご飯特集第1弾）); 668. (父ちゃんのいなり寿司（おいしいご飯特集第2弾）); 669. (ルリちゃんの寿司チャーハン（おいしいご飯特集第3弾）); 670. (ターキー徹底クッキング!!); (特別付録 うえやまとちの写真でクッキング)
69	July 19, 2002	978-4-06-300246-1
671. (さわやかなくずまんじゅう); 672. (やさしくマイルドなビーフカレー); 673. (夏!! すっきりさわやか ところてん); 674. (夏を乗り切るガンボカレー); 675. (チャツネをちょっとネ!!); 676. (いとしいキミにドミグラスソース&ハヤシライス); 677. (夏!! さっぱり冷水茶漬け); 678. (いごねりっておきゅうとかい!?（新潟・佐渡ひとり旅 前編）); 679. (そばどじょうをどーじょ!!（新潟・佐渡ひとり旅 後編）); 680. (さっぱりさわやかサラダ・ライス)
70	October 21, 2002	978-4-06-300251-5
681. (口いっぱいの幸せ!! 塩クジラクッキング); 682. (秋ですね～～～!! 栗の渋皮煮); 683. (秋を丸ごとスモーク・サンマ); 684. (スクランブルエッグでいってらっしゃい!!); 685. (ドイツのおふくろの味 肉ダンゴシチュー（ドイツ編第1弾）); 686. (ドイツ料理オンパレード!!（ドイツ編第2弾）); 687. (ザウマーゲン&ダンプフヌーデルン（ドイツ編第3弾）); 688. (プルーンケーキ&ジャガイモのスープ（ドイツ編第4弾）); 689. (ドイツからのおみやげシュトレン（ドイツ編第5弾）); (特別付録1 ドイツはおいし～～～い国でしたバイ!!); (特別付録2 おまけドイツ料理レシピ); (特別付録3 1～70巻収録メニュー一覧表)
71	January 21, 2003	978-4-06-300260-7
690. (ハムカツで乾杯!!); 691. (緑茶を食べよう!!); 692. (ポッカポカの酒まんじゅう); 693. (みんなで七面鳥鍋!!); 694. (赤カブ漬けでおめでとう!!); 695. (（スペシャル湯豆腐特集1）さらば!! 吉田ちゃん（前編）なごり鍋); 696. (（スペシャル湯豆腐特集2）さらば!! 吉田ちゃん（後編）酒蒸し湯豆腐); 697. (（スペシャル湯豆腐特集3）イタリアン湯豆腐); 698. (ガンコにうまい!! チャンジャクッキング); (特別付録 うえやまとちの写真でクッキング)
72	April 19, 2003	978-4-06-300262-1
699. (揚げちゃえ!! アゲマン); 700. (ホワイトデーにエンゼルフードケーキ); 701. (ふたりでうどん鍋); 702. (家族みんなでパルミエ); 703. (ふたりの夢おこし); 704. (春の新タマ丼); 705. (春のみそ汁を食べよう); 706. (春のうきうきロールキャベツサラダ); 707. (元気なひとにトンソクハム); (特別付録 うえやまとちの写真でクッキング)
73	July 18, 2003	978-4-06-300266-9
708. (豊かな味わい手作りコンニャク); 709. (（家庭で飲茶を!!1） イライラするのは飲茶おう!!); 710. (（家庭で飲茶を!!2） 飲茶で乾杯); 711. (みゆきの卵焼き); 712. (ちょっとオシャレなサルティンボッカ); 713. (ユニークなビワシューマイ); 714. (ひとみの新作シャコリア); 715. (母のチュロス); 716. (中華の定番!! 鶏肉とカシューナッツ炒め); 717. (夏の茶碗蒸し)
74	October 22, 2003	978-4-06-300268-3
718. (夏を食べよう!! 夏野菜のスキヤキふう); 719. (まだまだ現役魚肉ソーセージ); 720. (嗚呼!! フカヒレの姿煮); 721. (夏の思い出おつまみカレー); 722. (もっと野菜を食べよう!! ピスト); 723. (コノシロの酢漬けで、ごめーんたい!!); 724. (おつだね!! きなこめん); 725. (みそフライで秋を満喫!!); 726. (虹子流チリソースはいかが？); 727. (秋の鴨ネギリゾット)
75	January 22, 2004	978-4-06-300271-3
728. (秋を食べよう!! クリのコロッケ); 729. (甘くやさしいいとこ煮); 730. (すばらしい秋の日にガニスパ!!); 731. (あったまる～～ドブ汁); 732. ("そばぎゃあ"でおしあわせに); 733. (刀削麺に挑戦!!); 734. (美しくやさしくうまいうのはなあえ); 735. (おいしいパンでメリークリスマス!!); 736. (ふたりのアツアツ煮込み鍋); 737. (ごっついうまさ黒棒)
76	April 22, 2004	978-4-06-300275-1
738. (すてきなあなたにペッパーステーキを!!); 739. (おいしさ巻いてクリームシガール); 740. (ホカホカのエッグタルト); 741. (じっくりじっくりロースハム); 742. (おばあちゃんのテリーヌ!!); 743. (いとしのタコリーヌ); 744. (ロングロングアゴーラーメン); 745. (幸せのミートボールトマトソース煮込み); 746. (笑顔がミッチリ!! クラブハウスサンド); 747. (円熟の味 卵の春巻き)
77	July 22, 2004	978-4-06-300277-5
748. (チキンハムでカンパイ!!); 749. (わが家の野菜天); 750. (ロンドンの味 フィッシュ&チップス); 751. (ラムレッグロースト&シェパーズパイ); 752. (肝汁でお疲れさん!!); 753. (緑さわやかきぬさやクッキング); 754. (元気が出る！ キムチ手づかみクッキング!!); 755. (ポテトピザはいかが？); 756. (さわやかなアスパラのリゾット)
78	October 21, 2004	978-4-06-300278-2
757. (コンブで遊ぼう!!); 758. (ぜいたく!! あわび丼); 759. (さわやかにスープご飯); 760. (夢のトチュー); 761. (夏はひやひや甘酒クッキング); 762. (元気一発!! さっぱりステーキ); 763. (冷メンにチャレンジ！！); 764. (美味!! うなぎの中華風丼); 765. (そばギョーザでお疲れさん!!); (特別付録 うえやまとちの写真でクッキング)
79	January 20, 2005	978-4-06-300279-9
766. (衝撃のカレーうどん); 767. (さわやかな新ショウガクッキング); 768. (じっくりのんびり豆腐よう); 769. (甘い甘いスイートカレー); 770. (骨まで鯖クッキング); 771. (強烈にうまい!! 鶏のもも焼き); 772. (宮崎名物おもしろ大福にチャレンジ!!); 773. (大好き!! タイスキ); 774. (串カツが食べたい!!); (特別付録 うえやまとちの写真でクッキング)
80	April 21, 2005	978-4-06-300281-2
775. (そばの芽クッキング!!); 776. (けんちん汁であったまれ!!); 777. (ギョーザパーティーしましょう!!); 778. (豪快!! ちゃんちゃんピザ); 779. (ママが作ったマグロのステーキ); 780. (思い出の豚丼); 781. (超ビッグなソデイカクッキング); 782. (フロランタンでメリークリスマス!!); 783. (ウナヤキうどんでミッドナイトパーティー!!); (特別エッセイ "80巻になりましたバイ！！"); (単行本1−80巻収録メニユー一覧表)
81	July 21, 2005	978-4-06-300282-9
784. (大きくふくらめ!! もちふうせん); 785. (ゆずれないうまさ 鮭の飯ずし（麹クッキング特集①）); 786. (魔法の漬け床 三五八漬け（麹クッキング特集②）); 787. (漬物界の貴婦人？ べったら漬け（麹クッキング特集③）); 788. (チョコレートボンボンで酔っちゃおう!!); 789. (焼きイモしよう!!); 790. (おもしろ簡単 芝エビクッキング); 791. (じっくり煮つめてフルーツソース); 792. (さわやかな春のブランチ しろうおのオリーブオイル煮)
82	September 18, 2005	978-4-06-300283-6
793. (ウネ大根の輝き!!); 794. (いつまでもシナモンロール); 795. (愛情たっぷりお茶漬けの素); 796. (春のカルボナーラ); 797. (うまいぞ!! タコヤキオムレツ); 798. (ひっくり寿司はいかが？); 799. (ばあさんたちのイカしゅうまいタコしゅうまい); 800. (うれし～～いラスク); 801. (かあちゃんの大豆ハンバーグ); (巻末スペシャルクッキング 博多名物・からしめんたいを作ってみよう！)
83	November 20, 2005	978-4-06-300284-3
802. (元気を出して!! 焼豚飯); 803. (おおっ!! そら豆クッキング); 804. (今をおいしく!! エンドウクッキング); 805. (雨にきらめく かたくりフェンピー); 806. (暁の牛ホホ肉の赤ワイン煮込み); 807. (心のオアシス 海のスパゲティ); 808. (すばらしい讃岐うどん); 809. (すばらしい讃岐うどんⅡ); 810. (ひつまぶしスペシャル!!); (クッキングルポ まいったバイ 讃岐うどん)
84	January 21, 2006	978-4-06-300285-0
811. (真夏の昼の野菜ドレッシング); 812. (達人の独りもんカレー); 813. (やさしさしのんで カリントウ); 814. (エジプトかるかんはいかが!?); 815. (あたしたちのヤマメクッキング); 816. (甘～～い 梨のスープを); 817. (香りさわやか!! シソの実クッキング); 818. (おいし～～い 玄米栗ご飯); 819. (早くて簡単 おいしいごちそう 鶏のタタキ)
85	March 21, 2006	978-4-06-300286-7
820. (世界一のうまさ鶏の赤ワイン煮); 821. ("すがめに"を味わって); 822. (ホックリ!! 秋の里イモ椀（みちのく二人旅①）); 823. (秋田の夜はしょっつる鍋でふけゆく（みちのく二人旅②）); 824. (サラサラおいしいみちのくやきそば（みちのく二人旅③）); 825. (北の海からたらちり（みちのく二人旅④）); 826. (シンプルにおいしいおイモの万十); 827. (幸福のジャガバターカナッペ); 828. (あったか豆乳スープ)
86	May 23, 2006	978-4-06-300287-4
829. (うまいでー！ いりみそ); 830. (リュウキュウもうまいでぇー!!); 831. (冬の美味魚あらかぶの香醋アンかけ); 832. (あったか!! 白菜のクリーム煮); 833. (キミを忘れてフィナンシェ); 834. (ウマいぞ!! 塩サバ鍋); 835. (青春のそうめん); 836. (本物の鰻もどき); 837. (もちもちパンで元気もちもち!!)
87	July 21, 2006	978-4-06-300288-1
838. (春の味わい カニの卵とじ炒め); 839. (クスクスでスクスク！); 840. (素敵なあなたのブリック!!); 841. (春いっぱいの箱庭寿司); 842. (ハッとしてグゥなハツの煮込み); 843. (心をこめて フランスパン); 844. (まながつおはマジうまいぞ（春のおいしい魚特集①）); 845. (愛情いっぱい 鮎クッキング（春のおいしい魚特集②）); 846. (ゴージャスなごちそうヒジキ); (巻末特別エッセイ いちめんのなのはな)
88	September 22, 2006	978-4-06-300289-8
847. (ホホゆるむ 水無月); 848. (スイートメモリーラムカレー); 849. (さわやかに もずくそば!!); 850. (愛情ポレンタ); 851. (絶品!! ウニのキタッラ); 852. (ジンギスカンしましょう！); 853. (小さな恋のヨーグルトケーキ); 854. (男3匹のミーゴレン); 855. (夢の半助鍋); (特別付録 うえやまとちの写真でクッキング)
89	November 22, 2006	978-4-06-300290-4
856. (すっきりさわやか ナンバンソーメン); 857. ("ハロクマ"で暑さぶっ飛ばせ!!); 858. (ガッツ!! ロコモコ丼); 859. (友情の染み卵); 860. (あま～～い イチジクのピザ&パスタ); 861. (愛のサンマのピリ辛煮); 862. (あまい あま～～い リンゴのタルト); 863. (ホットな厚揚げクッキング); 864. (じっくりゆっくり 干しナマコクッキング)
90	January 23, 2007	978-4-06-300291-1
865. (スブリでどうだ!!); 866. (いろいろおいしいシメサカナ!!); 867. (ととの"かか煮"); 868. (まんまるカステラでいってみよう!!); 869. (あま～くやさしい特製たまご丼); 870. (ひりひりうまいオシドリ鍋); 871. (タイラギクッキング); 872. (パネトーネでメリークリスマス!!); 873. (うまさびっくり!! シメサバサンド)
91	March 23, 2007	978-4-06-300292-8
874. (寒い夜にワイン鍋); 875. (東坡肉まんが食べたーい!!); 876. (フワフワタチだんご（練り物特集①）); 877. (ギョーザ天って知ってる？（練り物特集②）); 878. (パパのツクネ鍋（練り物特集③）); 879. (カネロニでグラッチェ!!); 880. (許してカヌレ); 881. (きれいきれい 桃まんじゅう); 882. (はさみせんべい&せんべい汁)
92	May 23, 2007	978-4-06-300294-2
883. (みんなでチャプチェ!!（おいしい春雨クッキング①）); 884. (熊本育ち!! 太平燕（おいしい春雨クッキング②）); 885. (春の押し寿司); 886. (おもしろ名古屋名物あんかけスパ); 887. (春を満喫!! タケノコパーティー); 888. (ママのナッパの炒め煮); 889. (みつぐの肉巻きおにぎり（まこと青春編①）); 890. (ほろ甘いアメリカンクッキー（まこと青春編②）); 891. (キミにおくるスペシャルラザーニャ（まこと青春編③）)
93	July 23, 2007	978-4-06-300295-9
892. (すっきりさわやか焼酎カン); 893. (甘さフレッシュ!！ 新玉サラダ); 894. (涙のナミダ巻き); 895. (美しき五色ポテサラ); 896. (みんなでカンパチのハーブバーベキュー); 897. (元気が出る！ カツオクッキング!!); 898. (うまいよー！ マジャククッキング); 899. (先輩！ 砂肝ヤキソバです); 900. (夏を乗り切れ！ ウナカレー)
94	September 20, 2007	978-4-06-300296-6
901. (キミに捧げるピーナッツバタークリーム); 902. (元気一杯!！ ゴーヤの甘みそ炒め); 903. (夏の終わりのぶっかけ素麺); 904. (ことことじっくり 故郷のとんこつ（うまかど！ 鹿児島編－1）); 905. (やさしい味 ねったぼ（うまかど！ 鹿児島編－2）); 906. (おふくろさんのきびなご汁（うまかど！ 鹿児島編－3）); 907. (ハレの日のこが焼き（うまかど！ 鹿児島編－4）); 908. (懐かしいレモンケーキ（うまかど！ 鹿児島編－5）); 909. (キノコのカニアンかけで秋を満喫)
95	November 22, 2007	978-4-06-300297-3
910. (霧のトン平焼き（鉄板焼きスペシャル－1）); 911. (もんじゃはどうじゃ～!?（鉄板焼きスペシャル－2）); 912. (みんなでブリ大根スペシャル); 913. (スープカレーでパーティーもいいもんだ!!); 914. (ハリハリ鍋で忘年会!?); 915. (パリパリ鍋もうまいゾ！); 916. (鴨ネギそばだよ 全員集合!!); 917. (冬の海からのプレゼント!! はごいた飯); 918. (まこと頑張れ!! ニンジンライス)
96	February 22, 2008	978-4-06-300298-0
919. (アウトドアにザックリ白菜鍋（鹿狩り編－前編－）); 920. (大自然の味 シカスキ（鹿狩り編－後編－）); 921. (鹿のカムジャタン（鹿狩り－お土産編－）); 922. (みゆきからのキンカングミ); 923. (ド根性のカルメ焼き); 924. (棚からラクガン!?); 925. (みんなでスクスパチャンプル); 926. (うまいゾ!! 沖縄の豆腐クッキング); 927. (かあちゃんのドゥルワカシー); 928. (焼いて楽しいヒラヤーチ（&ポーポー）)
97	April 23, 2008	978-4-06-300301-7
929. (荒岩流チャンジャでおめでとー!！); 930. (イカヤキもうまかぶぁ～い!!); 931. (幸せの黒米パエリア); 932. (タケノコカナッペでパーティしよう!!); 933. (沖縄発 まぐろのしっぽクッキング!!); 934. (青汁ケーキで う～ん、うまい!!); 935. (世界で一番おいしい野イチゴのジャムパン); 936. (おふくろさんの回転焼き); 937. (夢ちゃんの愛情エビせん); 938. (タカハヤのその場でクッキング)
98	June 23, 2008	978-4-06-300302-4
939. (南国スペシャル餃子 ゴーザ（沖縄編第1弾）); 940. (沖縄極ウマ魚料理 マース煮（沖縄編第2弾）); 941. (沖縄料理オンパレード1（沖縄編第3弾）); 942. (沖縄のおやつ サーターアンダギー（沖縄編第4弾）); 943. (沖縄料理オンパレード2（沖縄編第5弾）); 944. (アクアパッツァでおかえりー!！); 945. (残暑お見舞い!! ヤマイモアイス); 946. (男はじっくりトルテリーニ!!); 947. (サッサッサッー？ サザエ丼); 948. (さわやかそうめん); (写真でクッキング 沖縄料理スペシャル)
99	August 22, 2008	978-4-06-300303-1
949. (君に捧げるチョコヨーカン); 950. (ごきげんロールサンドフライ); 951. (ばあちゃんのカマス寿司); 952. (元気が出る!! グラノーラクッキー（すばらしき久住 前編）); 953. (しみじみと しいたけ寿司（すばらしき久住 後編）); 954. (あったまる～!! カボチャのほうとう鍋（冬の鍋特集①）); 955. (おいしさ止まらん紅茶鍋（冬の鍋特集②）); 956. (スズキの和紙包み); 957. (クグロフでメリークリスマス!!); 958. (読者クッキングSPECIAL); (写真でクッキングSPECIAL)
100	November 27, 2008	978-4-06-300304-8
959. (あ～うめぇ！ カキとホタテのしぐれ丼); 960. (ポッカポカだよ カリンの酸辣ビーフン); 961. (どんどんできる 海鮮チャーハン5); 962. (さらさらと茶粥で); 963. (マグロめしで元気一杯!!); 964. (コンフィのうまさが身にしみるぜぃ!!); 965. (里イモめしで腹いっぱい!!); 966. (ふたりのモツじゃが&スジじゃが); 967. (ばでんです!!); 968. (白い輝き!! 千枚サンド); (巻末付録！ クッキングパパ検定)

== See also ==
- Cooking Papa
