= Cooking Papa (volumes 101–present) =

Japanese manga series volumes

Cooking Papa (Japanese: クッキングパパ, Hepburn: Kukkingu Papa) is a Japanese manga series written and illustrated by Tochi Ueyama. It has been serialized in Kodansha's seinen anthology magazine Morning since June 6, 1985. Kodansha has collected it into individual tankōbon volumes and it has a total of 176 volumes as of January 2026, making it one of the longest manga series by number of volumes. The story revolves around the life of Kazumi Araiwa, a salaryman who can cook well and full recipes for the dishes featured in each chapter are provided at the end of the chapter.

The series has been adapted into a 151-episode anime television series of the same name produced by ABC and Eiken, animated by Sunshine Corporation Japan, Trans Arts and Tiger Pro and directed by Toshitaka Tsunoda. The anime series was originally broadcast in Japan on TV Asahi between April 1992 and May 1995, A Japanese television drama adaptation aired on Fuji TV on August 29, 2008.

Cooking Papa won a Special Award at the 39th Kodansha Manga Awards in 2015.

== Manga volumes ==
No.	Release date	ISBN
101	December 22, 2008	978-4-06-300305-5
969. (キミに送る、ウサギのシチュー); 970. (すばらしい すば!!（充実！ 沖縄編①）); 971. (ミミガー・ミヌダル・チンスコウだよ!!（充実！ 沖縄編②）); 972. (魅惑の天ぷら（充実！ 沖縄編③）); 973. (春いっぱいのバンブーグ); 974. (おばあちゃんのあくまき); 975. (ハマグリの幸); 976. (みんなでタケノコグラタン); 977. (アメリカンドッグパーティーしよう!!); 978. (感動のアナゴのみそ汁)
102	January 23, 2009	978-4-06-300306-2
979. (大豆をおいしく!! きらすまめし&豆乳スープ); 980. (びっくり！ 万能ウスターソース); 981. (一石二鳥なカレールー); 982. (この夏クールふろふき); 983. (ごちそうサラダでお疲れさん!!); 984. (おばちゃんのおつまみ天プラ); 985. (きらめく!! イカちらし); 986. (スタミナ満点！ ステーキひつまぶし丼); 987. (あま～いピーマンいなり); 988. (スッキリ!! 野菜ソーメン)
103	March 23, 2009	978-4-06-300307-9
989. (兄ちゃんのたこライス); 990. (南国ヤキソバはもっ最高！); 991. (ミックスカツでわっちゃっちゃっ!!); 992. (愛（？）と友情のがぜみそ（しみじみ日本酒がおいしい料理第1弾）); 993. (こころはずむサンマのへしこ風（しみじみ日本酒がおいしい料理第2弾）); 994. (ハチノスチリビーンズで乾杯！); 995. (ふたりのアツアツバスケットヤキソバ); 996. (幸せのマーマー丼); 997. (どどんと丼三連発！); 998. (バーニャカウダで秋うまし！); 999. (おいしくてよだれ鶏)
104	May 22, 2009	978-4-06-300309-3
1000. (ラムのモーレソースで元気一杯!!); 1001. (二人の秘密 ハンガリアングーラッシュ); 1002. (ピザだ、ピザだ、ピザだっ!!); 1003. (ナポリのマンマのまんま！); 1004. (甘い甘～いババ&スフォリアテッラ); 1005. (夢のオリーブオイル); 1006. (シチリア風モツパンはいかが？); 1007. (元祖パエリアが食べたい!!); 1008. (スペイン居酒屋料理スペシャル5); 1009. (ただいま～のパエリア2)
105	July 23, 2009	978-4-06-300310-9
1010. (今夜はホワイト・スキヤキ!?); 1011. (わけありのうまさ大手羽ロースト); 1012. (春の海からの恵みを塩しゃぶで！); 1013. (春のブッセ); 1014. (マイXO醤を作ってみよう！); 1015. (男のカツオカレー（カツオ料理特集-1）); 1016. (ネコに生節!!（カツオ料理特集-2）); 1017. (2人でカツオ飯を!!（カツオ料理特集-3）); 1018. (じゃりんこジャリパン); 1019. (カラ～～ないろいろライス); (うえやまとちの奇食ハンター1日入隊体験記)
106	September 23, 2009	978-4-06-300311-6
1020. (幸せのチキンライス（スペシャルライス特集‐1）); 1021. (元気なパパのガーリックライス（スペシャルライス特集‐2）); 1022. (すぱらしいスパめし（スペシャルライス特集-3）); 1023. (豪華!! アワビのワタミソ焼き!!); 1024. (チューカレーでお疲れーさん!!); 1025. (夏にあつあつウナギ鍋); 1026. (格別!! スムージー); 1027. (ナス麺であ～涼しい!!（夏の麺特集-1）); 1028. (スタミナ満点皿うどん（夏の麺特集-2）); 1029. (ガーッと油そば!!（夏の麺特集-3）); (うえやまとちの写真でクッキング（野菜麺）)
107	November 20, 2009	978-4-06-300313-0
1030. (美味!! ヤマメのサンショウミソ); 1031. (エビマヨの幸せ); 1032. (プデチゲでいってみよう!!); 1033. (秋のミニコースはいかが!?); 1034. (ショウガで合唱!!); 1035. (スキッとうまいカプサイ飯); 1036. (アイ・ライク・シブースト); 1037. (けんちゃん焼きでチャンチャン♪（新米クッキング特集-1）); 1038. (クルマエビな幸せ（新米クッキング特集-2）); 1039. (フカフカふ丼（新米クッキング特集-3）); (うえやまとちの写真でクッキング（クルマエビの握り寿司）)
108	January 22, 2010	978-4-06-300314-7
1040. (マロンケーキでぶっ飛ばせ!!); 1041. (愛情ミックスフライ); 1042. (玄界大漁節!! 青魚の一夜漬け); 1043. (すばらしき天草大王（天草ラブラブ旅行 前編）); 1044. (すばらしき大王鍋（天草ラブラブ旅行 後編）); 1045. (とうちゃんのからすみ); 1046. (しみじみアカメイモの煮しめ); 1047. (みんなでソフトカクテル); 1048. (うずら丼でありがとう!!); 1049. (キューブなタコ焼き); (うえやまとちの写真でクッキング（愛情ミックスフライ）)
109	March 23, 2010	978-4-06-300315-4
1050. (牛スジ飯で大満足); 1051. (エキゾチックな洋風がめ煮); 1052. (読者クッキングSPECIAL); 1053. (スペシャル煮込みハンバーグでおめでとう！ おめでとう!!); 1054. (おいしいネ!! ヤキトリおでん); 1055. (みんなで花見寿司); 1056. (ヒージャー汁で超元気!!); 1057. (春吉な夜のまーみなーチャンプル); 1058. (イナムドゥチはどうちすか？); 1059. (タケノコ掘り丼でありがとう!!)
110	May 21, 2010	978-4-06-300316-1
1060. (ビフカツでがんばって!!); 1061. (キムチ鍋でよろしく!!); 1062. (ナカミで勝負!?); 1063. (ネギトロギョーザでおはようさん!!); 1064. (大自然の中で香りチャーシュー); 1065. (美味!! イカの沖漬け); 1066. (おいしさかみしめてはごたえバーガー); 1067. (この夏 モツ鍋カレー); 1068. (あなたとあちゃら漬け); 1069. (君に捧げる鉄火パン); (うえやまプロ劇場)
111	August 23, 2010	978-4-06-300317-8
1070. (元気百倍イラブー汁!!); 1071. (常夏の島の沖縄おでん（宮古パラダイス編-1）); 1072. (イラブチャークッキング（宮古パラダイス編-2）); 1073. (宮古カクテルでカンパイ!!（宮古パラダイス編-3）); 1074. (みんなでアバラのグリル（宮古パラダイス編-4）); 1075. (カボチャのチーズケーキでおめでとう!!); 1076. (この秋 サンマはコンフィで); 1077. (おおお好み焼きはいかが？); 1078. (コーンブレッドはママの味!?); 1079. (幸せのオ・ブルー); (スペシャルコラム 美しい宮古島)
112	November 22, 2010	978-4-06-300319-2
1080. (焼いてもダメならアゲタタキ!!); 1081. (美しい夕焼け丼); 1082. (黄金のオリーブオイル（ラブラブ小豆島 前編）); 1083. (緑の宝石 オリーブの塩漬け（ラブラブ小豆島 後編）); 1084. (キミとボクとのオリーブ・クッキング); 1085. (めんたいムースでハッピークリスマス!!); 1086. (寄って集まって蒸し鍋); 1087. (なつかしの棒ダラクッキング); 1088. (がめカレー・がめチューの幸せ); 1089. (春を呼ぶ鰆の桜揚げ); (スペシャルコラム オリーブを求めて～小豆島探訪記～)
113	February 23, 2011	978-4-06-300321-5
1090. (やったー！ やったー！ やっタンメン!!); 1091. (慶びのしゅんかん); 1092. (恋のアップルグラタン); 1093. (熱い想いのじりじり); 1094. (オヤジのトリもつ丼); 1095. (いちご煮の幸せ); 1096. (愛の香り 桜の花の塩漬け); 1097. (愛を込めてハートのロールケーキ); 1098. (かわいいかわいい芽キャベツクッキング); 1099. (つけめんはいいね); (うえやまプロスタッフ劇場)
114	May 23, 2011	978-4-06-300322-2
1100. (恋のトライアングル フキ・タケ・トリ煮); 1101. (もっちもちコメピザ（おもしろパン特集-1）); 1102. (なかよしフォカッチャ（おもしろパン特集-2）); 1103. (グリッシーニでうれっしーに!!（おもしろパン特集-3）); 1104. (ベーグルを作ってみよっかー（おもしろパン特集-4）); 1105. (ごちそうスタッフド・ポーク); 1106. (突撃!! 若者の晩ごはんオンパレード); 1107. (やさしいホワイトマーボー); 1108. (みんなで梅ミソ); 1109. (ギュウッと牛タンチャーハン); (うえやまプロスタッフ劇場)
115	July 22, 2011	978-4-06-300323-9
1110. (青春の納豆粥); 1111. (おいしさ1番!! ホロホロ鳥のロースト); 1112. (タバスコカレーでガオーッ!!（カレーシリーズ第1弾）); 1113. (山笠があるけんタジンカレーたい!!（カレーシリーズ第2弾）); 1114. (あま～～～～いフルーツカレー（カレーシリーズ第3弾）); 1115. (盆タラの幸せ！); 1116. (笑顔のバーベギュー丼); 1117. (かきたま汁で元気回復!!); 1118. (サバの水煮でカンパイ); 1119. (涙のシシリアンライス); (うえやまとちの写真でクッキング)
116	September 23, 2011	978-4-06-300325-3
1120. (秋のドリームケーキ（秋のスイーツスペシャル第1弾）); 1121. (秋の夜のシャルロット（秋のスイーツスペシャル第2弾）); 1122. (めしませ!! ホットなシャルロット（秋のスイーツスペシャル第3弾）); 1123. (野菜の宝石箱 ノルマンディ風サラダ); 1124. (幸福の年輪大根); 1125. (秋の夜のキノコご飯); 1126. (ラブラブ紅白おでん); 1127. (しみじみレンコンご飯); 1128. (カキの汁かけ飯であったまれ!!); 1129. (いとしのキミへパンチェッタ)
117	December 22, 2011	978-4-06-300326-0
1130. (アヒージョをどーじょ!!); 1131. (豚スネ肉のシチューで年忘れ!!); 1132. (あけましてライスペーパーパーティー!!); 1133. (煮みそが食べたい!!); 1134. (元気でいこうナポリタンD); 1135. (待ち焦がれていた焼きカレー); 1136. (寒さふっ飛ぶさっぱりモツ鍋); 1137. (かわいい～モッチョッチョ); 1138. (おばあちゃんの小魚のスープ); 1139. (今泉ふきんな夜のチーズのみそ漬け); (うえやまとちの写真でクッキング)
118	March 23, 2012	978-4-06-300328-4
1140. (愛されてサンマーメン（スイート横浜 前編）); 1141. (口づけて!! ヨコハマン・カクテル（スイート横浜 後編）); 1142. (春のにぎわい まぐろ鍋); 1143. (愛しのちょぼ焼き); 1144. (春のタケノコゴロゴロカレー); 1145. (サクサク ココナッツサブレ); 1146. (元気が出るカツオのスリ流し汁); 1147. (ハカタロールでオーライ!!); 1148. (アワビのコンブ蒸し（奇想天外古代クッキング-1）); 1149. (イノシシのハスの葉包み焼き（奇想天外古代クッキング-2）); (クッキングパパの原始時代グルメ!!)
119	June 22, 2012	978-4-06-300329-1
1150. (ゆで豚ローストきみに～～!!（アイドル誕生!? 前編）); 1151. (漬け込みローストビーフください～～？（アイドル誕生!? 後編）); 1152. (おもろいヘルシーハンバーグ); 1153. (幸せのラーメンサラダ); 1154. (ピーマンでごメン!!); 1155. (豪快!! ゴーヤカレー); 1156. (きらめく夜にサルスエラ); 1157. (すてきな夏の日の夢 カポナータ&ケーク・サレ); 1158. (ズッパディペッシェの誘惑!!); (パパタン! ～クッキングパパよか店探訪～)
120	August 23, 2012	978-4-06-300331-4
1159. (HELP! 牛スジカレー!!（さすらいの生月 前編）); 1160. (スペアリブのらっきょうローストでヤァ！ ヤァ！ ヤァ！（さすらいの生月 後編）); 1161. (大将へ!! 白身魚と野菜のミルフィーユ); 1162. (往く夏の冷たいスパゲティ・フルーツソース); 1163. (ときめきのスパゲティ・ポルチーニ); 1164. (豆腐でダイエットクッキング!!); 1165. (我が良き友とちくわの磯辺揚げ); 1166. (サバソバでダンス!!); 1167. (あっぱれ!! 豆腐餃子!!); (タイムスリップグルメ第2弾～江戸時代編～); (パパタン! ～クッキングパパよか店探訪～)
121	November 22, 2012	978-4-06-300332-1
1168. (鉄人級のうまさ！ 3つの赤ワインロースト!!); 1169. (チキンライスチキンでRUN！ RUN!! RUN!!!); 1170. (ビーフライスビーフでドーンといってみよう!!); 1171. (プレッツェルにはまってる!!); 1172. (あなたにカンパーニュ!!); 1173. (北海大ダコ料理三昧!!); 1174. (おいしいゆず茶であったまれ!!); 1175. (あつあつ～シシ鍋); 1176. (トンソクととうがんのスープ作れるもん!!); 1177. (み～んなでこども鍋)
122	January 23, 2013	978-4-06-300333-8
1178. (カオソーイでサワディカップ!!（みんなで祝タイ編-1）); 1179. (幸せ包んでミアンカム（みんなで祝タイ編-2）); 1180. (気分は王様 カントーク（みんなで祝タイ編-3）); 1181. (タイの美味三昧!!（みんなで祝タイ編-4）); 1182. (至福の調味料 ナンプリックガピ（みんなで祝タイ編-5）); 1183. (おどろきのタイスイーツ ローティーサーイマイ（みんなで祝タイ編-6）); 1184. (超美味!! プーパッポンカリー&クン・チェー・ナンプラー!!（みんなで祝タイ編-7）); 1185. (タイのおみやげ カノムクロック); 1186. (大いに博多ピザ); 1187. (カラタマとカラサラと友達と)
123	March 22, 2013	978-4-06-300334-5
1188. (春の海の足あと揚げ); 1189. (愛のおもしろおでん!!); 1190. (オイルサーディンで今夜も最高っ!!); 1191. (みゆきのシャカシャカ焼き!!); 1192. (ビックリな潮干狩りで仰天貝千チャンポン!!); 1193. (愛シングクッキーを作ろう!!); 1194. (男のタケノコ春巻き!!); 1195. (涙のネギクッキング); 1196. (やさしい～コロッケそば); 1197. (ナポリタン焼きそばは撮ってもいいー!!); (パパタン！ ～クッキングパパよか店探訪～)
124	June 21, 2013	978-4-06-300335-2
1198. (愛しいキミにスープカレーチャンポン); 1199. (炎のコンキリエ・アラビアータ); 1200. (パラサイトなイトコン料理はいかが？); 1201. (夏さっぱりトリ皮クッキング!!); 1202. (ヒラメをおろしてみよう!!); 1203. (ズッキーニこわい!!); 1204. (九州名物あいすまんじゅうを作ってみよう!!); 1205. (パンツァネッラな弟よ!!); 1206. (大好評！ 豚汁DX!!); 1207. (骨かじりの幸せ!!)
125	October 23, 2013	978-4-06-300337-6
1208. (二人のザンギ); 1209. (大好き!! ホッケソーメン); 1210. (グレープなおまえとサラミなオレ!!); 1211. (石狩鍋でよろしくです!!); 1212. (ナイスなミートナス); 1213. (大好評！ ぶっ豚だうまさ ポルケッタ); 1214. (アゲグリ&アゲグリスブタで行こうよ!!); 1215. (スープカレーおでんであったまれ!!（夢のサーモンフィッシング編-1）); 1216. (ピーマンみそのチャンチャン焼きやろうぜ!!（夢のサーモンフィッシング編-2）); 1217. (カレールウを使って…♪ カレーチャーハン（クックパッド特別編）)
126	January 23, 2014	978-4-06-300338-3
1218. (ママと一緒にマイルドケジャン（おいしいカニシリーズ-1）); 1219. (ホッとしてセコのミソ汁（おいしいカニシリーズ-2）); 1220. (びっくりのガン汁（おいしいカニシリーズ-3）); 1221. (プレママへゆり根鍋（ゆり根クッキング-1）); 1222. (ゆり根三昧で花ひらけ!!（ゆり根クッキング-2）); 1223. (塩麹ベーコンでグッドモーニング!!); 1224. (アツアツ!! ボルシチ風おでん); 1225. (角煮ローストで大満腹!!); 1226. (結んでひらいて包み焼き!!); 1227. (乙女の味方！ クロッカンテ)
127	March 20, 2014	978-4-06-300339-0
1228. (幸せの鐘を鳴らしてブロッコリー鍋); 1229. (カイチアオで生きぬけ！); 1230. (日田焼きそばはおもしろいゾ！（2人のひたん旅 前編）); 1231. (ひたん寿しは楽しいゾ!!（2人のひたん旅 後編）); 1232. (キャベツのスープで元気！ 元気!!); 1233. (ピリリッ!! シイタケのからし漬け); 1234. (すっきりーっ!! リナラムネ); 1235. (じいちゃんの好きな菜の花のファルファーレ); 1236. (チョコアンゼリカで乾杯!!); 1237. (ママの山菜まぜごはん); 1238. (少女達のマリーゴールドなオムライス!!)
128	June 23, 2014	978-4-06-300340-6
1239. (イタリアン鍋DXでおめでとう!!); 1240. (飛んできたえんどう豆の卵焼き); 1241. (師匠と弟子のフィッシュサラダ!!); 1242. (シーちゃんと花ちゃんのタマネギジャム!!); 1243. (元気ハツラツ！ 牛ハツ炒め!!); 1244. (ドライトマトでヤッホーです!!); 1245. (栄光のコロダイ!!（釣魚クッキング-1）); 1246. (みんなで雑魚鍋!!（釣魚クッキング-2）); 1247. (麗しのブルーベリーサラダ（目にいいクッキング-1）); 1248. (ゆかい～なサザエ飯♪（目にいいクッキング-2）); 1249. (南海の宝石 海ぶどうのお寿司); (パパタン！ ～クッキングパパよか店探訪～)
129	September 22, 2014	978-4-06-300341-3
1250. (パパの愛情たっぷりローストポーク!!); 1251. (受け継がれるダシカラ); 1252. (オムコンそばはたまんね～っ!!); 1253. (歓びのレブヒート&スナキュー); 1254. (マヨブタで決定!!); 1255. (旅立ちのH・Pビビンパ); 1256. (かっこいい～!? チムタク); 1257. (秋のダンゴ汁DX); 1258. (ロックン・トンカツオムレツ♪); 1259. (大人のチーズケーキで乾杯!!); (パパタン！ ～クッキングパパよか店探訪～)
130	November 21, 2014	978-4-06-300342-0
1260. (おうちで鉄板ステーキを!!); 1261. (おいなりちまきでエッヘン!!); 1262. (晩秋のハマグリスパ); 1263. (出会いのおからあげ); 1264. (今年のクリスマスはカスタニャッチャ!!); 1265. (ゆく年くる年 H・P師走鍋); 1266. (SOSヤキソバで生き残れ!!); 1267. (女王様のスノーホワイトカレー!!); 1268. (甘く苦いカリカリコーヒーチョコ); 1269. (ドリーム餃子はうまいですバイ!!（130巻記念特別収録）)
131	February 23, 2015	978-4-06-300343-7
1270. (粒マスタードを作ってみよう!!); 1271. (我が家のてば鍋); 1272. (ジネンジョピザは元気が出るゾ!!); 1273. (男・同志のワカサギマキマキ); 1274. (うまみ丸ごと!! 塩煮大根); 1275. (朴葉焼きはふるさとの味!!); 1276. (ジン・レモンでオールナイト!!); 1277. (なつかしのロールキャベツバーグ); 1278. (ママのクレソンのおひたし); 1279. (おはようっ！ エッグベネディクト); (特別収録 クッキングパパvs.グラゼニ 唐揚げチャーハン日本シリーズ開幕！)
132	June 17, 2015	978-4-06-300344-4
1280. (トンソク煮は母の味!!); 1281. (真っ赤な情熱の還暦鍋!!); 1282. (一生に一度の夢のステーキ・ロッシーニ風); 1283. (大胆不敵なタコスパ!!); 1284. (復活!! ちゃんら～); 1285. (元気のもと バターもち!!); 1286. (カツオのオイル煮で乾杯!!); 1287. (一人五合（ごんごう）五平もち); 1288. (兄ちゃんのスジがめ煮!!); 1289. (雨に咲く花 紫陽花の和菓子)
133	August 21, 2015	978-4-06-300345-1
1290. (万能調味料 カルピスクッキング!!); 1291. (博多カジョスにチャレンジ!!); 1292. (この夏 漬け込みバーベキューしよう!!); 1293. (黒い宝石！ のりの佃煮); 1294. (波乗りマッコリカクテル!!); 1295. (涼やかなだしで残暑払いを!!); 1296. (夏をあきらめないでゴーヤの佃煮); 1297. (隠れた博多名物 儀助煮); 1298. (ファイトとうちゃんチャンボッタ!!); 1299. (鯨ジャガはうまいゾ!!)
134	November 20, 2015	978-4-06-300346-8
1300. (明太子DXクッキングはうまいゾ!!); 1301. (秋を丸ごと吹き寄せ煮); 1302. (輝け！ 大根葉のサラダ!!); 1303. (大きく育て!! 梅芋飯); 1304. (いい夫婦に塩レモンクッキング!!); 1305. (超美味全部盛り！ 九州海鮮丼!!); 1306. (みつぐの肉ジャガおでん); 1307. (みんなで熟成アンチョビパーティー!!); 1308. (お好み焼きかき揚げでいってみよう!!); 1309. (おばあちゃんのコンビーフコロッケ（クックパッド特別編）)
135	February 23, 2016	978-4-06-300347-5
1310. (三大博多名物鍋 イワシちり!!); 1311. (力みなぎる鯨の煮込み!!); 1312. (新しい出会いにムハンマラ!!); 1313. (めでたくアラカブ&アナゴ鍋); 1314. (愛情たっぷり！ カラフル野菜スープ); 1315. (おいしさひろがる大根カレー&大根きんぴら); 1316. (なつかしのまんまるコロッケ2); 1317. (ベイクド・アラスカで幸あれ!!); 1318. (フランスのおごちそうカスレ); 1319. (美味！ 和風牛のたたき)
136	April 22, 2016	978-4-06-300348-2
1320. (タラッリで大正解!!); 1321. (ケール・つくし・えびのパスタでレッツゴー!!); 1322. (なんとなく～鯨のケチャップ炒め!!); 1323. (もてる男のピーマンカナッペ); 1324. (衝撃のオムリタン!!); 1325. (にくたらしいヤツを食っちまえ!!); 1326. (さわやカウダは大人の味!!); 1327. (今も昔もこれからもイタリアン鍋DX2); 1328. (ペキンポークで決め!!); 1329. (みゆき流魚のたたきはベリーグッド♪)
137	June 17, 2016	978-4-06-300349-9
1330. (何も言わずにスジ肉ジャガ); 1331. (キクラゲ飯の幸せ!!); 1332. (みんなで豚めんロール!!); 1333. (父の日はコロコロオムライスで!!); 1334. (夢のドレンチェリー&ドレントマト); 1335. (空へトンジャオロースー); 1336. (思い出そっとして――チキンソテー); 1337. (ソルティーフィッシュでお祭りだい!!); 1338. (夏の元気はズッキーニのスープ&パンケーキで!!); 1339. (ゆに～くおにぎり4でバイバイ!!)
138	September 2016	978-4-06-300350-5
1340. (残暑をのりきれ！ ニラ玉DX!!); 1341. (元気みなぎるパワフルみそ汁!!); 1342. (おいしいコロツケモン（楽しいジャガイモ料理-1）); 1343. (ソフト・ポテ・クリームでありがとう!!（楽しいジャガイモ料理-2）); 1344. (とろろアワビに大チャレンジ!!); 1345. (フ・カレーでおつかれ～さん!!); 1346. (新・鯛茶漬けでナイスファイト!!); 1347. (パクチーなヤキソバはいかが!?); 1348. (やっちゃえ!! ハッピーバーガー); 1349. (ゆべし作るべし!!)
139	November 22, 2016	978-4-06-300351-2
1350. (世界一のうみのおでん（あったか鍋物特集-1）); 1351. (あったまる～!! みそモツ鍋（あったか鍋物特集-2）); 1352. (みかんサンドでどうだ!?); 1353. (揚げないチップスでメリークリスマス!!); 1354. (七草リゾットでおめでとう!!); 1355. (あま～くおいしい干し柿クッキング); 1356. (ミルキーおでんでもえ～～～!!（柳川ロマン編-1）); 1357. (柳川名物みろっげのおきざみ（柳川ロマン編-2）); 1358. (サーモンのパテでハッピーバレンタイン!!); 1359. (早春の梅の花の巻き寿司)
140	March 23, 2017	978-4-06-300352-9
141	May 23, 2017	978-4-06-300353-6
142	August 23, 2017	978-4-06-510200-8
143	November 22, 2017	978-4-06-510257-2
144	January 23, 2018	978-4-06-510663-1
145	March 23, 2018	978-4-06-510929-8
146	May 23, 2018	978-4-06-511373-8
147	September 21, 2018	978-4-06-512843-5
148	December 21, 2018	978-4-06-513984-4
149	March 22, 2019	978-4-06-514947-8
150	July 23, 2019	978-4-06-516509-6
151	October 23, 2019	978-4-06-517615-3
152	January 23, 2020	978-4-06-518159-1
153	April 23, 2020	978-4-06-519102-6
154	July 20, 2020	978-4-06-520231-9
155	October 23, 2020	978-4-06-520822-9
156	January 22, 2021	978-4-06-521935-5
157	April 23, 2021	978-4-06-523003-9
158	July 20, 2021	978-4-06-523917-9
159	October 21, 2021	978-4-06-525693-0
160	January 21, 2022	978-4-06-526613-7
161	April 21, 2022	978-4-06-527583-2
162	July 22, 2022	978-4-06-528561-9
163	October 21, 2022	978-4-06-529520-5
164	January 23, 2023	978-4-06-530473-0
165	April 21, 2023	978-4-06-531470-8
166	July 21, 2023	978-4-06-532432-5
167	October 23, 2023	978-4-06-533302-0
168	January 23, 2024	978-4-06-534324-1
169	April 23, 2024	978-4-06-535332-5
170	July 23, 2024	978-4-06-536207-5
171	October 22, 2024	978-4-06-535331-8
172	January 22, 2025	978-4-06-538111-3
173	May 22, 2025	978-4-06-539535-6
174	July 23, 2025	978-4-06-540083-8
175	October 23, 2025	978-4-06-541149-0
176	January 22, 2026	978-4-06-542249-6

== See also ==
- Cooking Papa
