= Shōta no Sushi =

Japanese manga series

- First tankōbon volume cover, featuring Shota Sekiguchi

将太の寿司
- Genre: Cooking
- Manga
- Written by: Daisuke Terasawa
- Published by: Kodansha
- Imprint: Shōnen Magazine Comics
- Magazine: Weekly Shōnen Magazine
- Original run: September 2, 1992 – April 2, 1997
- Volumes: 27
Further information
Television drama
Directed by	Yuichi Sato; Toshinori Nishimae
Produced by	Takeshi Moriya
Written by	Akira Tomozawa; Shogo Kashida
Music by	Takayuki Hattori
Studio	Fuji TV
Original run	April 19, 1996 – September 20, 1996
Episodes	17
Anime television film
Shōta no Sushi: Kokoro ni Hibiku Shari no Aji
Directed by	Toshitaka Tsunoda
Written by	Takahiko Masuda
Studio	Studio Comet
Original network	TV Tokyo
Released	October 11, 1999
Runtime	47 Minutes
Manga
Shōta no Sushi: Zenkokutaikai-hen
Written by	Daisuke Terasawa
Published by	Kodansha
Imprint	Shōnen Magazine Comics
Magazine	Weekly Shōnen Magazine
Original run	April 23, 1997 – August 2, 2000
Volumes	17
Manga
Shōta no Sushi 2: World Stage
Written by	Daisuke Terasawa
Published by	Kodansha
Imprint	Evening KC
Magazine	Evening
Original run	September 24, 2013 – April 28, 2015
Volumes	4
- icon

Shōta no Sushi (将太の寿司; lit. 'Shota's Sushi') is a Japanese manga series written and illustrated by Daisuke Terasawa. It was serialized in Kodansha's shōnen manga magazine Weekly Shōnen Magazine from 1992 to 1997, with its chapters collected in 27 tankōbon volumes. It follows Shota Sekiguchi, a teenage boy, and his journey from apprentice to sushi chef. It was adapted into TV series, produced by Fuji TV. It was followed by a second series, Shōta no Sushi: Zenkokutaikai-hen, published in Weekly Shōnen Magazine from 1997 to 2000, and a third series, Shōta no Sushi 2: World Stage, published in Evening from 2013 to 2015.

== Plot ==
The family of Shota Sekiguchi (関口 将太, Sekiguchi Shōta) owns a small sushi shop called Tomoe Sushi (巴寿司) in Otaru, Hokkaido. Their business struggles against Sasa Sushi (笹寿司), a large sushi chain that dominates the market through aggressive pricing and mass production. Compounding their difficulties, Shota's mother suffers from a chronic illness, draining the family's savings and disrupting his father Genji (源治)'s ability to work. When Genji is injured and unable to compete in a local sushi contest, Shota takes his place. Though he does not win, his skill impresses Seigoro Otori (鳳征 五郎, Ōtori Seigorō), owner of the renowned O Sushi (鳳寿司) in Tokyo, who offers him an apprenticeship. Recognizing that Shota needs broader experience to save their family business, Genji agrees.

In Tokyo, Shota faces numerous challenges, realizing that mastering sushi requires more than just technical skill. While senior apprentices Seiji Fujita (藤田 政二, Fujita Seiji) and Hidemasa Okamura (岡村 秀政, Okamura Hidemasa) are supportive, Anto Saji (佐治 安人, Saji Anto) bullies both Shota and fellow apprentice Shingo Obata (小畑 慎吾, Obata Shingo). Seigoro observes their rivalry and organizes a three-round competition between Shota and Anto to determine who will represent O Sushi in an upcoming Tokyo contest. The first round tests their ability to prepare out-of-season sea bream. Anto steals the fish Shota's friends procure for him, forcing Shota to use an inferior substitute. Despite this, Shota wins by employing superior technique, humbling Anto. In the second round, focusing on unagi, Anto holds an advantage with a three-year-old eel sauce, while Shota improvises a sauce-free preparation. Though his dish is praised, he loses for failing to answer a critical question about serving etiquette.

For the final round, Shota chooses anchovies—a fish Anto had mockingly compared to Shingo—to encourage his demoralized friend. He defeats Anto, who, despite his loss, matures from the experience. Seigoro offers Anto a promotion, but Anto declines, choosing to train elsewhere to avoid stagnation. He vows to challenge Shota again in the future. Shota proceeds to compete in the Tokyo sushi tournament, honing his craft with each round. Meanwhile, in Otaru, Sasa Sushi intensifies its efforts to force Tomoe Sushi out of business, adding urgency to Shota's growth as a chef.

== Media ==
=== Manga ===
Written and illustrated by Daisuke Terasawa, Shōta no Sushi was serialized in Kodansha's shōnen manga magazine Weekly Shōnen Magazine from September 2, 1992, to April 2, 1997. Kodansha collected its chapters in 27 tankōbon volumes, released from July 13, 1992, to July 15, 1997.

A second series, titled Shōta no Sushi: Zenkokutaikai-hen (将太の寿司〜全国大会編〜; lit. 'Shota's Sushi: The National Championship Arc'), was serialized in Weekly Shōnen Magazine from April 23, 1997, to August 2, 2000. Kodansha collected its chapters in 17 tankōbon volumes, released from July 13, 1992, to July 15, 1997.

A third series, titled Shōta no Sushi 2: World Stage (将太の寿司2 World Stage), was serialized in Kodansha's seinen manga magazine Evening from September 24, 2013, to April 28, 2015. Kodansha collected its chapters in four tankōbon volumes, released from March 20, 2014, to June 23, 2015.

=== Drama ===
A 17-episode television drama adaptation was broadcast on Fuji TV from April 19 to September 20, 1996.

=== Anime special ===
A anime television special animated by Studio Comet aired on TV Tokyo on October 11, 1999.
