= Nigatsu no Shōsha =

Japanese manga series

- Nigatsu no Shōsha: Zettai Gōkaku no Kyōshitsu
- First tankōbon volume cover, featuring Kurōdo Kuroki

二月の勝者 ―絶対合格の教室―
- Manga
- Written by: Shiho Takase
- Published by: Shogakukan
- Magazine: Weekly Big Comic Spirits
- Original run: December 4, 2017 – May 20, 2024
- Volumes: 21
- icon

Nigatsu no Shōsha: Zettai Gōkaku no Kyōshitsu (Japanese: 二月の勝者 ―絶対合格の教室―; lit. 'The February Winner: The Classroom for Guaranteed Success') is a Japanese manga series written and illustrated by Shiho Takase. It was serialized in Shogakukan's seinen manga magazine Weekly Big Comic Spirits from December 2017 to May 2024, with its chapters collected in 21 tankōbon volumes.

In 2022, the manga won the 67th Shogakukan Manga Award for the general category.

== Media ==
=== Manga ===
Written and illustrated by Shiho Takase, Nigatsu no Shōsha was serialized in Shogakukan's seinen manga magazine Weekly Big Comic Spirits from December 4, 2017, to May 20, 2024. Shogakukan collected its chapters in 21 tankōbon volumes, released from February 9, 2018, to July 11, 2024.

==== Volumes ====
No.	Release date	ISBN
1	February 9, 2018	978-4-09-189792-3
2	June 12, 2018	978-4-09-189885-2
3	October 12, 2018	978-4-09-860088-5
4	February 12, 2019	978-4-09-860217-9
5	June 12, 2019	978-4-09-860311-4
6	October 11, 2019	978-4-09-860417-3
7	February 12, 2020	978-4-09-860539-2
8	June 30, 2020	978-4-09-860641-2
9	August 7, 2020	978-4-09-860691-7
10	January 12, 2021	978-4-09-860802-7
11	April 12, 2021	978-4-09-861037-2
12	August 11, 2021	978-4-09-861120-1
13	October 12, 2021	978-4-09-861178-2
14	December 10, 2021	978-4-09-861203-1
15	April 12, 2022	978-4-09-861270-3
16	September 12, 2022	978-4-09-861409-7
17	February 7, 2023	978-4-09-861577-3
18	June 12, 2023	978-4-09-861723-4
19	October 12, 2023	978-4-09-862537-6
20	February 7, 2024	978-4-09-862703-5
21	July 11, 2024	978-4-09-862774-5

=== Drama ===
A ten-episode television drama adaptation, starring Yuya Yagira as Kurōdo Kuroki, was broadcast on Nippon Television from October 16 to December 18, 2021.

== Reception ==
The series ranked 30th on the 2020 "Book of the Year" list by Da Vinci magazine; it ranked twelfth on the 2024 list. The series won the 67th Shogakukan Manga Award in the general category, along with Don't Call it Mystery, in 2022.

== See also ==
- Internet Shopping Prince Yoshimi Ida, another manga series by the same author
