= Mister Ajikko =

Japanese manga series

- First tankōbon volume cover, featuring Youichi Ajiyoshi

ミスター味っ子 (Misutā Ajikko)
- Genre: Cooking
- Manga
- Written by: Daisuke Terasawa
- Published by: Kodansha
- Imprint: Shōnen Magazine Comics
- Magazine: Weekly Shōnen Magazine
- Original run: September 17, 1986 – January 11, 1990
- Volumes: 19
- Anime television series
- Directed by: Yasuhiro Imagawa; Nobuyuki Nakamura (chief episode director); Yūji Yamaguchi (chief episode director)
- Produced by: Gotsu Heita; Tomoyuki Ikeda; Kenji Uchida; Toru Hasegawa
- Written by: Noboru Shiroyama (chief writer, 1–75); Jinzō Toriumi & Otori Kobo (75–99)
- Music by: Daito Fujita
- Studio: Sunrise
- Original network: TXN (TV Tokyo)
- Original run: October 8, 1987 – September 28, 1989
- Episodes: 99
- Manga

Mister Ajikko II
- Written by: Daisuke Terasawa
- Published by: Kodansha
- Imprint: Evening KC
- Magazine: Evening
- Original run: August 12, 2003 – January 4, 2012
- Volumes: 13
- Manga

Mister Ajikko Bakumatsu-hen
- Written by: Daisuke Terasawa
- Published by: Asahi Shimbun Publications
- Imprint: Asahi Comics
- Magazine: Sanada Taiheiki
- Original run: December 26, 2015 – September 27, 2019
- Volumes: 4
- icon

Mister Ajikko (Japanese: ミスター味っ子, Hepburn: Misutā Ajikko; lit. 'Mr. Taste Kid') is a Japanese manga series written and illustrated by Daisuke Terasawa. It was serialized in Kodansha's shōnen manga magazine Weekly Shōnen Magazine from 1986 to 1990, with its chapters collected in 19 tankōbon volumes.

It was adapted into a 99-episode anime television series by Sunrise, broadcast on TV Tokyo from October 1987 to September 1989.

A second manga series, titled Mister Ajikko II, was serialized in Kodansha's seinen manga magazine Evening from August 2003 to January 2012, with its chapters collected in 13 tankōbon volumes. Another series, titled Mister Ajikko Bakumatsu-hen, was serialized in Asahi Shimbun Publications's Sanada Taiheiki from December 2015 to September 2019, with its chapters collected in four tankōbon volumes.

== Plot ==
Youichi Ajiyoshi is a culinary prodigy who co-manages a restaurant with his mother. When food critic Genjirou Murata visits their establishment, he is astonished by the exquisite flavor and craftsmanship of Youichi's katsudon. Impressed, Murata invites Youichi to the Ajiou Building, where he competes in a spaghetti challenge against Marui, the resident Italian chef. Combining innovative techniques with a dedication to culinary excellence, Youichi triumphs. This victory marks the beginning of his journey to surpass rival chefs in pursuit of gastronomic mastery.

== Characters ==
=== Hinode Eatery ===
The Hinode Eatery (日之出食堂, Hinode Shokudō; lit. 'Sunrise Eatery') is a local restaurant in an unnamed Tokyo neighborhood, also home to Ajiou Company. It serves affordable, simple Japanese fare, mainly catering to working-class patrons. However, as Youichi defeats more opponents, their winning dishes are periodically added to the menu.

Youichi Ajiyoshi (味吉 陽一, Ajiyoshi Yōichi)
Voiced by: Minami Takayama
Youichi, the 14-year-old head chef of his family's restaurant, is a prodigy with fierce pride in his craft. After his mother recognizes his talent, he takes over the kitchen, creating innovative dishes. His skills impress Ajiou, leading to an invitation to the Ajiou Building, where he defeats an Italian chef in a spaghetti battle. Known for his competitive streak—dubbed his 'sickness' by his mother—he rarely backs down from cooking battles but remains loyal to friends. His only losses come from an unofficial match and failing to recreate his late father's signature dish.
Noriko Ajiyoshi (味吉 法子, Ajiyoshi Noriko)
Voiced by: Mari Yokoo
Noriko is the owner of Hinode Eatery, having taken over after her husband's death. While managing all aspects of the restaurant, she leaves the cooking to her son Youichi unless he is away. Though skilled herself, she often samples his dishes to offer feedback. She observes that Youichi shares his late father's personality and culinary passion, and consistently supports him in his cooking competitions.
Takao Ajiyoshi (味吉 隆男, Ajiyoshi Takao)
Voiced by: Hōchū Ōtsuka (first voice), Kazuhiko Inoue (second voice), Kōichi Yamadera (third voice)
Takao was Youichi's late father and the former owner of Hinode Eatery, having passed away approximately five years before the main events. A skilled and passionate chef, he left behind a cookbook of recipes and techniques that Youichi frequently consults. However, the book is missing a crucial page detailing a rare soup recipe, which later becomes significant.
Mitsuko Yamaoka (山岡 みつ子, Yamaoka Mitsuko)
Voiced by: Yōko Kawanami
Mitsuko is Youichi's classmate and a part-time waitress at Hinode Eatery, assisting both as a favor to his mother and to stay close to him—though he remains oblivious to her romantic interest. Prone to jealousy when other girls distract him, she lacks strong cooking skills but enthusiastically supports Youichi, often taste-testing his creations. Exclusively appearing in the anime, she also helps explain specialized cooking techniques during competitions.
Shigeru Yamaoka (山岡 しげる, Yamaoka Shigeru)
Voiced by: Miki Narahashi
Shigeru is Mitsuko's 7-year-old brother who frequently visits Hinode Eatery, preferring Youichi's cooking over his sister's. He often samples dishes and enjoys free meals at the restaurant. An enthusiastic baseball fan, he appears exclusively in the anime series.

=== Ajiou Company ===
The Ajiou Company (味皇料理会, Ajiō Ryōrikai; lit. 'Taste Emperor Cuisine') is the nation's largest culinary conglomerate. Though its exact operations are never specified, it likely oversees restaurant chains, cooking schools, and other food-related ventures.

Genjirou Murata (村田 源二郎, Murata Genjirō) / Ajiou (味皇, Ajiō; lit. 'Taste Emperor')
Voiced by: Yuzuru Fujimoto, Jūrōta Kosugi (young)
Genjirou Murata, known as Ajiou, has led Japan's culinary world for thirty years as head of the Ajiou group. A skilled chef with refined taste, he personally oversees his empire and nurtures promising talent. Recognizable by his gray hair, beard, and traditional Japanese attire, he takes particular interest in Youichi after their first meeting, frequently appearing at his cooking battles and occasionally providing venues. To dispel retirement rumors, he establishes the "Ajiou Company Grand Prix Contest" for young chefs. In the manga's two competitions, Youichi ties for first in the initial event and wins the second outright.
Taro Tareme (垂目 太郎, Tareme Tarō) / Shintaro Tareme (垂目 森太郎, Tareme Shintarō) (anime)
Voiced by: Naoki Tatsuta
Ajiou's personal secretary, whose name reflects his droopy-eyed appearance, accompanies the executive at all times. Dressed in a suit and carrying a briefcase, he handles practical matters such as payments and transportation arrangements.
Yoshio Marui (丸井 善男, Marui Yoshio)
Voiced by: Shōzō Iizuka
Marui leads the Italian cooking department at Ajiou Company, a stout man distinguished by his thick black mustache. His first encounter with Youichi occurs when the boy outperforms him in an Italian cooking class, sparking a spaghetti battle that ends in Marui's defeat. Graciously accepting the outcome, he becomes one of Youichi's most steadfast allies, offering guidance before competitions and occasionally assisting at Hinode during Youichi's absences. After celebrating his 41st birthday with a friendly duel against Youichi—where they jointly defeat a robotic opponent—Marui returns to Italy. He holds the distinction of being the second recipient of the Golden Plate, a decade before Youichi earns his.
Motoyuki Shimonaka (下仲 基之, Shimonaka Motoyuki)
Voiced by: Ken'yū Horiuchi
Shimonaka leads the French cooking department at Ajiou Company, standing out as the youngest department head with his distinctive blond, flipped-up hairstyle. Classically trained in France, he remains the only department head to compete in the GP Contest as an official representative. After conceding defeat in the second round due to excessive fish bones in his dish, he returns to France for further training. Though determined to defeat Youichi upon his return, he ultimately develops respect for the young chef, considering him a friend despite never achieving victory against him.
Hiroyuki Shiba (芝 裕之, Shiba Hiroyuki)
Voiced by: Takkō Ishimori
Shiba oversees the Japanese cooking department at Ajiou Company, presenting a distinguished appearance with his swept-back light hair and traditional Japanese attire. He primarily serves as a judge in company-sponsored cooking battles, including the final showdown between Youichi and Ajiou. The son of a squid vendor, his culinary roots reflect a connection to traditional ingredients.
Takeo Sekiba (関場 武雄, Sekiba Takeo)
Voiced by: Daiki Nakamura (first voice), Ikuya Sawaki (second voice)
Sekiba leads the German cooking department at Ajiou Company, distinguished by his receding dark curly hair and signature cravat worn beneath a collared coat. Like other department heads, he frequently judges company-sponsored cooking battles. Youichi later assists him in protecting the company's reputation during a decisive bratwurst competition.
Seidou Yonemoto (米本精道, Yonemoto Seidō)
Voiced by: Katsumi Suzuki
Yonemoto oversees the Chinese cooking department at Ajiou Company, characterized by his black hair and perpetually narrowed eyes. Typically dressed in suits, he completes the judging panel for all company-sponsored cooking battles.

=== Aji Shougun Group ===
The Aji Shougun Group (味将軍グループ, Aji Shōgun Gurūpu; lit. 'Taste General Group') is a shady rival to Ajiou, aggressively pushing local restaurants—including Hinode—out of business. They previously forced Youichi's father to close his traditional floating teahouse. While their food is good, they rely on flashy gimmicks like decorated trucks to draw crowds. When they target a restaurant, the owner often turns to Youichi for help.

=== Other rivals ===
Kazuma Sakai (堺一馬, Sakai Kazuma)
Voiced by: Mie Suzuki
Sakai is Youichi's primary rival, another 14-year-old culinary prodigy recognized by his distinctive fang when smiling. Their first confrontation occurs when Sakai, under the employ of a developer seeking to demolish Hinode, challenges him to a curry battle—which Youichi wins through innovative use of pineapple and coffee. The rivals face off repeatedly, including in both GP Contests where they tie once before Youichi claims victory. Formerly holding a Yellow Plate for Japan's top institutional chefs, Sakai ultimately opens his own curry shop adjacent to Hinode, inspired by their competitions.
Kazuya Konishi (小西和也, Konishi Kazuya)
Voiced by: Hirotaka Suzuoki
Konishi is a meat specialist with shaggy dark hair and a prominent cleft chin. His first encounter with Youichi occurs during a steak competition, where he loses to the young chef's innovative heated plate technique. After a second defeat in the GP Contest's opening round, he accepts the outcome with greater composure and becomes a recurring supporter, often observing Youichi's battles and assisting at Hinode. Though briefly affiliated with the Aji Shogun Group, he later pursues training as a sushi chef.
Hyouta Nakae (中江 兵太, Nakae Hyōta)
Voiced by: Nozomu Sasaki
Nakae is a Kyushu-based chef in his early twenties, known for his dedication to cultivating his own ingredients. Towering and muscular with long dark hair and a characteristic nose bandage, he stands apart from Youichi's other rivals through his consistently good-natured demeanor. Their first encounter results in Nakae's victory—one of Youichi's rare defeats—though their friendly rivalry continues in the second GP Contest, where Nakae falls short in the final steak battle. His associates later challenge Youichi unsuccessfully. Nakae previously competed for three specialty plates (Red for International cuisine, Blue for seafood, Green for herbal/medicinal dishes) to earn the right to face master chef Kazuma.
Kohou Ryuu (劉 虎峰, Ryū Kohō)
Voiced by: Nobuo Tobita
Ryuu is a 19-year-old culinary prodigy from Hong Kong. Distinguished by his spiked two-toned hair and traditional white Chinese coat, he first encounters Youichi during the latter's Hong Kong visit, where they battle to an inconclusive result. Though eliminated early in the second GP Contest, Ryuu reappears periodically, even aiding Youichi against his former mentor who betrayed him.

== Media ==
=== Manga ===
Written and illustrated by Daisuke Terasawa, Mister Ajikko was serialized in Kodansha's shōnen manga magazine Weekly Shōnen Magazine from September 17, 1986, to January 11, 1990. Kodansha collected its chapters in 19 tankōbon volumes, released from January 14, 1987, to March 15, 1990.

==== Other series ====
A second series, titled Mister Ajikko II (ミスター味っ子II), was serialized in Kodansha's seinen manga magazine Evening from August 12, 2003, to January 4, 2012. (Note: It started in the magazine's 12th issue of 2003, released on August 12, 2003.) Its chapters were collected in 13 tankōbon volumes, released from June 23, 2004, to February 23, 2012.

Another series, titled Mister Ajikko Bakumatsu-hen (ミスター味っ子 幕末編), was serialized in Asahi Shimbun Publications's Sanada Taiheiki from December 26, 2015, to September 27, 2019. Its chapters were collected in four tankōbon volumes, released from September 7, 2016, to December 20, 2019.

=== Anime ===
A 99-episode anime television series produced by Sunrise was broadcast on TV Tokyo from October 8, 1987, to September 28, 1989.

The series was pitched for broadcast on the Food Network in the United States, but ultimately turned down.
