= Daisuke Terasawa =

Japanese manga artist (born 1959)

- Born: 10 June 1959 (age 67); Kobe, Japan
- Occupation: Manga artist
- Notable work: Shota no Sushi

Daisuke Terasawa (寺沢大介, Terasawa Daisuke; born 10 June 1959 in Kobe, Japan) is a Japanese manga artist. He is best known for writing cooking manga series such as Mister Ajikko and Shōta no Sushi, which earned him twice the Kodansha Manga Award for shōnen in 1988 and 1996 respectively. Both series have been adapted as dramas, the latter as a live-action television series, the former as the first cooking anime television series.

== Works ==
- Mister Ajikko (ミスター味っ子), 1986–1989, 10 volumes
- Warashi (WARASHI), 1990–1991, 4 volumes
- Shota no Sushi (将太の寿司), 1992–1997, 27 volumes
- Shota no Sushi: Zenkokutaikai hen (将太の寿司〜全国大会編〜), 1997–2000, 17 volumes
- Kuwasemon! (喰わせモン!), 2001, 4 volumes
- Kui Tan (喰いタン), 2002–2009, 16 volumes
- Mister Ajikko II (ミスター味っ子II), 2003–2012, 13 volumes
