= Internet Shopping Prince Yoshimi Ida =

Japanese manga series

- Cover of first volume

おとりよせ王子 飯田好実 (Otoriyose Ōji Iida Yoshimi)
- Genre: Comedy
- Manga
- Written by: Shiho Takase
- Published by: Tokuma Shoten
- Magazine: Comic Zenon
- Original run: December 25, 2010 – May 25, 2016
- Volumes: 7
- Television drama
- Directed by: Masaya Kakehi; Tatsuya Matsuoka; Keita Mizunami
- Original network: Nagoya TV
- Original run: April 27, 2013 – July 6, 2013
- Episodes: 10
- icon

Internet Shopping Prince Yoshimi Ida (Japanese: おとりよせ王子 飯田好実, Hepburn: Otoriyose Ōji Iida Yoshimi) is a Japanese manga series written and illustrated by Shiho Takase.

== Publication ==
Internet Shopping Prince Yoshimi Ida was first released as serial in Monthly Comic Zenon between December 25, 2010, and May 25, 2016. The individual chapters were then released by Tokuma Shoten into seven tankōbon (collected volumes) from November 19, 2011, to July 20, 2016.

Three chapters of a spin-off manga titled Īda-kun no Kyūjitsu (飯田くんの休日) have been published on Zenon's sister magazine, Web Comic Zenyon, since June 29, 2014.

The series also inspired the publication of a recipe book of food featured in the manga; it was published by Pia on September 30, 2014.

== Television drama ==
The manga was adapted into a Japanese television drama, which ran for ten episodes on Nagoya TV from April 27, 2013, to July 6, 2013. Directed by Masaya Kakehi, Tatsuya Matsuoka and Keita Mizunami, it starred Yōichirō Ōmi as the titular character. The series was released on DVD by Pony Canyon on October 2, 2013, in two formats: a box set containing all episodes and four rental Region 2 DVDs.

== Reception ==
The first four volumes of Internet Shopping Prince Yoshimi Ida sold 300,00 copies. Volumes 5 and 6 of the manga appeared on Oricon's weekly chart of the best-selling manga; the former appeared in the 32nd place for selling 35,950 copies, while the latter placed 33rd and sold 44,341 copies.

== See also ==
- Nigatsu no Shōsha, another manga series by the same author
