= Cooking manga =

Japanese comics genre

Cooking manga (Japanese: 料理漫画, Hepburn: ryōri manga), also known as gourmet manga (Japanese: グルメ漫画, Hepburn: gurume manga), is a genre of Japanese manga and anime where food, cooking, eating, or drinking is a central plot element. The genre achieved mainstream popularity in the early 1980s as a result of the "gourmet boom" associated with the Japanese bubble economy.

== Characteristics ==
In Manga! Manga! The World of Japanese Comics, author Frederik L. Schodt categorizes cooking manga as type of "work manga", a loose category defined by stories about activities and professions that stress "perseverance in the face of impossible odds, craftsmanship, and the quest for excellence," and whose protagonists are frequently "young men from disadvantaged backgrounds who enter a profession and become the 'best in Japan.'" Individual chapters of cooking manga typically focus on a specific dish, and the steps involved in preparing it. While stories still incorporate standard narrative elements such as plot and character development, significant emphasis is frequently placed on the technical aspects of cooking and eating. Cooking manga stories often feature detailed descriptions or photorealistic illustrations of the dish itself; a recipe for the dish is often also included.

Cooking manga is a multi-genre category, with cooking manga stories that center romance, crime, mystery, and numerous other genres having been produced. The age and gender of a cooking manga's protagonist typically indicates its intended audience, with both men and women forming the audience for the genre; while home food preparation is stereotyped as women's work in Japan as it is in the West, professional cooking and connoisseurship tend to be considered as male activities. Cooking manga is inclusive of stories concerning a variety of world cuisines, and is not limited to stories about Japanese cuisine exclusively.

== History ==
While manga has long contained references to food and cooking, cooking manga would not emerge as a discrete genre until the 1970s. The three manga that are considered forerunners of the modern genre are Totsugeki Ramen (Weekly Shōnen Jump, 1970) by Mikiya Mochizuki, Cake Cake Cake (Nakayoshi, 1970) by Moto Hagio and Aya Ichinoki, and Kitchen Kenpo (Shimbun Akahata, 1970) by Mieko Kamei. The rise in interest in gourmet and cooking manga has been linked to the rise in average family income in the 1970s and the ability of ordinary Japanese families to eat out.

Jirō Gyū and Jō Big's Hōchōnin Ajihei (Ajihei the Cook), serialized in Weekly Shonen Jump from 1973 to 1977, is noted as one of the first cooking manga titles. Hōchōnin Ajihei established several of the conventions still present in cooking manga today, including the exaggerated reactions of people eating the food as a way to convey its deliciousness to the reader who may have never tasted the pictured ingredients and the cooking battle where a qualified judge describes the taste to the reader.

The genre achieved mainstream popularity in the early 1980s as a result of Japan's "gourmet boom", wherein economic growth associated with the Japanese bubble economy widened access to luxury goods and caused the appreciation of fine foods, fine dining, and the culinary arts to become popular interests and hobbies. During this period, Oishinbo (lit. The Gourmet) was first published in the manga magazine Big Comic Spirits; the 103-volume series would become the most-circulated cooking manga of all time. Oishinbo is notable for shifting the focus of cooking manga from an artisan's skill or craft to a critic's discernment. The art is extremely restrained compared to previous cooking manga and the characters display their good taste through monologues about the purity of the ingredients or techniques used to draw out the best taste. Along with Oishinbo, the other two long running cooking manga that influenced this period were The Chef (1985) by Tadashi Katou and Cooking Papa (Weekly Morning, 1986) by Tochi Ueyama.

In the early 2000s, cooking manga began to focus more on attainable or everyday foods. Depiction of real restaurants' specialties became common as well as the inclusion of recipes at the end of the manga's chapter or anime's episode, a technique Cooking Papa pioneered. After Oishinbo was put on hiatus in 2014, there was an explosion of narrowly focused food and cooking manga. Themes included everything from ekiben to hamburgers to eel.

To date, nearly 1,000 manga series in the cooking genre have been produced.

== See also ==
- List of cooking anime and manga
