= Cooking Papa =

Japanese manga series and its adaptation(s)

- Cover of the first tankōbon volume, featuring Kazumi Araiwa (center)

クッキングパパ (Kukkingu Papa)
- Genre: Cooking; Slice of life
- Manga
- Written by: Tochi Ueyama
- Published by: Kodansha
- Imprint: Morning KC
- Magazine: Morning
- Original run: June 6, 1985 – present
- Volumes: 178
- Anime television series
- Directed by: Toshitaka Tsunoda
- Written by: Hiroyuki Hoshiyama; Shun'ichi Yukimuro
- Music by: Toshihiko Sahashi
- Studio: Eiken (production); Sunshine Corporation Japan (animation); Trans Arts (animation); Tiger Pro (animation)
- Original network: ANN (ABC, TV Asahi)
- Original run: April 9, 1992 – May 25, 1995
- Episodes: 151
- icon

Cooking Papa (Japanese: クッキングパパ, Hepburn: Kukkingu Papa) is a Japanese manga series written and illustrated by Tochi Ueyama. It has been serialized in Kodansha's seinen anthology magazine Morning since June 6, 1985. Kodansha has collected it into individual tankōbon volumes and it has a total of 176 volumes as of January 2026, making it one of the longest manga series by number of volumes. The story revolves around the life of Kazumi Araiwa, a salaryman who can cook well and full recipes for the dishes featured in each chapter are provided at the end of the chapter.

The series has been adapted into a 151-episode anime television series of the same name produced by ABC and Eiken, animated by Sunshine Corporation Japan, Trans Arts and Tiger Pro and directed by Toshitaka Tsunoda. The anime series was originally broadcast in Japan on TV Asahi between April 1992 and May 1995, A Japanese television drama adaptation aired on Fuji TV on August 29, 2008.

Cooking Papa won a Special Award at the 39th Kodansha Manga Awards in 2015.

== Story ==
The story revolves around a salaryman named Kazumi Araiwa who can cook well but is unwilling to let it be known within his workplace. He lets everyone in the company believe that his wife Nijiko Araiwa cooks his meals when, in truth, she could not prepare anything. While he cooks every dish that is found within his daily tasks everyday in life, he still needs to take care of his son Makoto Araiwa and later his baby daughter and Makoto's baby sister, Miyuki Araiwa.

== Production ==
Cooking Papa is written and illustrated by Tochi Ueyama. He was born on February 22, 1954, in Fukuoka City, now Hakata-ku. Ueyama began drawing manga in elementary school and pursued it as a career by his first year of junior high school. He officially began as a manga artist in the late 1970s. A one-shot manga by Ueyama titled Cooking Boss was published by Akita Shoten in a few issues of Monthly Shōnen Champion in 1982. The story follows Ajitomo Araiwa, a high-schooler who loves to cook. Shortly thereafter he achieved a serialization in Kodansha's weekly anthology Morning with Ōaza Aza Basara Chūzaijo, which centered around a rural police station. Its wholesome and heartwarming slice of life themes set the tone for his next work, Cooking Papa, which was picked up by the same magazine.

Cooking Papa originated as a casual sketch by Ueyama depicting a father cleaning a house while carrying a child on his back. He was asked by the staff at Morning to expand on the concept. In the draft version, the protagonist Kazumi Araiwa's occupation was that of a painter before being changed to a salaryman at the behest of the magazine's editor-in-chief. Kazumi's "gorilla"-like appearance was made to be intentionally ironic as Ueyama believed such a person would be unlikely to have culinary skills. The author had himself learned to cook at an early age while home alone with his siblings. Weekly production on Cooking Papa starts with Ueyama preparing a dish and photographing every step for his assistants to illustrate. Meals are concocted and then taste-tested through trial-and-error to perfect each week's recipe. Up to six assistants work five days a week from 10:00 AM to midnight and sometimes later in order to meet deadlines. Ueyama pens each installment's narrative around the chosen food, draws all the characters' faces, and opts to shade with screentone by hand rather than rely on digital tools. He has admitted that devising both the recipes and their respective stories to be universally appealing is very challenging.

The manga is set in Hakata on the island of Kyushu where Ueyama lives and works. Known for its acceptance of foreign cuisine due to its proximity to other Asian countries, a number of dishes featured in the series originate from outside Japan. Ueyama uses common ingredients found at a local supermarket close to his home, stating he wants anyone to be able to prepare the meals. The longevity of the series has led to some repetition in recipes including 40 to 50 variations of curry rice. An original food called onigirazu was depicted in the manga's 22nd volume. This is a modification of traditional Japanese rice balls (onigiri) but is quicker and easier to make. Ueyama credited his wife with one day hurriedly inventing the dish for their child. Onigirazu was posted on recipe-sharing websites such as Cookpad around 2015, decades after the original chapter was published, eventually leading to the food's international popularity.

When Cooking Papa began in 1985, Japanese multimedia rarely depicted men working in the kitchen due to the country's social norms. Launching on the eve of the Japanese economic bubble, this was the same year the country passed the Equal Employment Opportunity Law, requiring that employers provide the same job opportunities to men and women. The manga's plot alters some of the generally accepted gender roles found in a typical Japanese family. Consequently, Kazumi spends a large portion of the early plot telling his colleagues that his wife Nijiko is responsible for his delicious lunches. It was not until the manga's 51st volume, over a decade into its run, that Kazumi reveals to them his love for cooking. Despite the timing of the series' debut, Ueyama claimed that he has never had a progressive agenda when writing it in this regard and that he chose the premise because it was interesting. He wished to include a nuclear family dynamic with a husband and wife having fulfilling jobs at and away from home while both providing happiness to and enriching the lives of their children. He has repeatedly stated that the manga's motto is simply "cooking is fun." The author has passively considered ending the series on several occasions. However, he has always concluded that there are still more stories he wants to tell.

== Media ==
=== Manga ===
Cooking Papa first appeared as a one-shot manga in the February 21, 1985, issue of the Kodansha seinen magazine Morning. It has been serialized weekly in the same publication since June 6 of that year. Kodansha has collected its chapters into individual tankōbon volumes, with the first one published on January 18, 1986. As of January 2026, 176 volumes have been released.

=== Anime ===
The anime of Cooking Papa was aired on TV Asahi Thursday every week from April 9, 1992, to May 25, 1995. It was produced by Eiken and ADK Holdings, Inc. and animated by Sunshine Corporation. The anime series was directed by Toshitaka Tsunoda and ran for 151 episodes.

The anime rerun on Tokyo MX as part of the manga's 30th anniversary.

==== Cast ====
- Kazumi Araiwa: Tesshō Genda
- Nijiko Araiwa: Masako Katsuki
- Makoto Araiwa: Minami Takayama
- Miyuki Araiwa: Minami Takayama
