= Monthly Shōnen Magazine =

Japanese manga magazine

- Editor-in-Chief: Keigo Nakama
- Former editors: Yasuyuki Mimura
- Categories: Shōnen manga
- Frequency: Monthly
- Circulation: 95,500; (July–September 2026)
- First issue: November 1964; 62 years ago
- Company: Kodansha
- Country: Japan
- Based in: Tokyo
- Language: Japanese
- Website: gmaga.co

Monthly Shōnen Magazine (Japanese: 月刊少年マガジン, Hepburn: Gekkan Shōnen Magajin) is a monthly shōnen manga magazine published in Japan by Kodansha. It was launched in November 1964 under the name Bessatsu Shōnen Magazine (別冊少年マガジン). In April 1969, it was retitled as Monthly Bessatsu Shōnen Magazine (月刊別冊少年マガジン) and its publication frequency increased from quarterly to monthly. After suspension in 1974, it started publishing again; in May 1975, it was renamed as its current magazine title.

It had a supplement magazine called Shōnen Magazine R, which launched in 2015. The magazine originally published a new issue once every two months, until it became a digital-only magazine in October 2019 with a monthly schedule. In January 2023, Shōnen Magazine R ceased publication. In February 2023, a new web publication called Getsu Maga Kichi (Monthly Magazine Base) replaced Shōnen Magazine R.

== Manga series ==
=== Currently running manga series ===
Series title	Author	First issue
The Band	Harold Sakuishi	December 2024
Dead Rock	Hiro Mashima	July 2023
Dear Boys Act 4	Hiroki Yagami	October 2018
Fermat Kitchen (フェルマーの料理)	Yugo Kobayashi	September 2018
Firefighter Daigo: Rescuer in Orange (め組の大吾 救国のオレンジ, Megumi no Daigo: Kyūkoku no Orange)	Masahito Soda	October 2020
The Fledgling Demon Lord's Starter Shop (すだちの魔王城, Sudachi no Maōjō)	Makoto Morisaki	October 2021
Futari Switch (ふたりスイッチ)	Akira Hiramoto	March 2022
In/Spectre	Chasiba Katase, Kyō Shirodaira	December 2019
Pumpkin Scissors	Ryōtarō Iwanaga	November 2006
Ryūrōden: Ouha Rikkoku-hen (龍狼伝 中原繚乱編)	Yoshito Yamahara	July 2016
Tekken Chinmi Legends (鉄拳チンミLegends)	Takeshi Maekawa	September 2006
Welcome to the Ballroom (ボールルームへようこそ)	Tomo Takeuchi	November 2011
You Can't Bluff the Sharp-Eyed Sister (聖女に嘘は通じない)	Hyūganatsu, Yo Asami	March 2023
Zero Zero One (ゼロゼロワン)	Shōgo Aoki	June 2023

=== Completed series ===
==== 1960s ====
- Terebi-kun (テレビくん) by Shigeru Mizuki (1965)
- Tensai Bakabon (天才バカボン) by Fujio Akatsuka (1967–1969, 1974–1978)

==== 1970s ====
- Spider-Man: The Manga by Kōsei Ono, Kazumasa Hirai (story) and Ryoichi Ikegami (art) (1970–1971)
- Violence Jack (バイオレンスジャック) by Go Nagai (1977–1978)

==== 1980s ====
- Nanto Magoroku (なんと孫六) by Kei Sadayasu (February 1981 – May 2014)
- Ironfist Chinmi (鉄拳チンミ) by Takeshi Maekawa (1983–1997)
- Meimon! Takonishi Ouendan (名門!多古西応援団) by Juzo Tokoro (June 1984 – May 1992)
- Ikenai Luna Sensei! (いけない!ルナ先生) by Kamimura Sumiko (1986–1988)
- Shura no Mon (修羅の門) by Masatoshi Kawahara (1987–1996)
- 1+2=Paradise by Sumiko Kamimura (1988–1990)
- Akira Tobu!! (あきら翔ぶ!!) by Katsuyuki Toda (1989–1996)
- Angel Beat by Ichiru Yasuhara (1989–1996)
- Dear Boys by Hiroki Yagami (1989–1997)

==== 1990s ====
- Ryūrōden (龍狼伝) by Yoshito Yamahara (1993–2007)
- Dear Boys The Early Days by Hiroki Yagami (1997)
- Shin Tekken Chinmi (鉄拳チンミ) by Takeshi Maekawa (1997–2004)
- Et Cetera (えとせとら) by Tow Nakazaki (1997–2000)
- Dear Boys Act II by Hiroki Yagami (1997–2008)
- Beck by Harold Sakuishi (1999–2008)

==== 2000s ====
- Shana ou Yoshitsune (遮那王義経) by Hirofumi Sawada (2000–2007)
- Capeta by Masahito Soda (2003–2013)
- Rocket Man (ロケットマン) by Motohiro Katou (October 6, 2001 – December 6, 2004)
- Yatagarasu by Aihara Tsukasa (2002 – April 6, 2011)
- Alive: The Final Evolution (アライブ -最終進化的少年-) by Tadashi Kawashima (2003–2010)
- C.M.B. Shinra Hakubutsukan no Jiken Mokuroku (C.M.B. 森羅博物館の事件目録) by Motohiro Katou (2005–2020)
- Yonebu Times (米豊TIMES) by Hiroshi Yamane (December 6, 2005 – August 6, 2007)
- Shana ou Yoshitsune: Genpei no Kassen (遮那王義経 源平の合戦) by Hirofumi Sawada (2007–2015)
- A School Frozen in Time (冷たい校舎の時は止まる) by Mizuki Tsujimura (story) and Naoshi Arakawa (art) (2007–2009)
- Dear Boys Act 3 by Hiroki Yagami (2008–2015)
- Those Snow White Notes (ましろのおと) by Marimo Ragawa (2009–2022)
- Shin Kamen Rider Spirits (新 仮面ライダーSPIRITS) by Kenichi Muraeda (July 2009 – August 2025)

==== 2010s ====
- Shura no Mon: Daini Mon (修羅の門 第弐門) by Masatoshi Kawahara (2010–2014)
- Shura no Mon: Fudekage (修羅の門異伝 ふでかげ) by Masatoshi Kawahara (2010–2014)
- Noragami (ノラガミ) by Adachitoka (2010–2024)
- Your Lie in April (四月は君の嘘) by Naoshi Arakawa (2011–2015)
- Fire Ball! by Yukinobu Tatsu (2013–2014)
- Kuro Ageha (くろアゲハ) by Atsushi Kase (2014–2022)
- Kakushigoto (かくしごと) by Kōji Kumeta (2015–2020)
- Dear Boys Over Time by Hiroki Yagami (2016–2017)
- Farewell, My Dear Cramer (さよなら私のクラマー) by Naoshi Arakawa (2016–2020)
- Can You Just Die, My Darling? (今夜は月が綺麗ですが、とりあえず死ね) by Majuro Kaname (story) and Sousou Sakakibara (art) (2017–2021)
- Seraph of the End: Guren Ichinose: Catastrophe at Sixteen (一瀬グレン、16歳の破滅) by Takaya Kagami (story) and Yo Asami (art) (2017–2022)
- Love After World Domination (恋は世界征服のあとで) by Hiroshi Noda (story) and Takahiro Wakamatsu (art) (2019–2022)

==== 2020s ====
- Ishura (異修羅) by Keiso (story) and Meguri (art) (2021–2024)
- Thunder 3 (サンダー3) by Yuki Ikeda (2022–2026)
- Dorahachi (ドラハチ) by Yū Ajina (story) and Hayato Natsukawa (art) (2023)
- Danzai no Majutsu Gari (断罪の魔術狩り) by Taro Hitsuji (story) and Mahiru Sukuya (art) (February 2023 – February 2024)
