= CMB (disambiguation) =

CMB is the cosmic microwave background, the thermal radiation left over from the time of recombination in Big Bang cosmology.

CMB may also refer to:

== Science and technology ==
- Core–mantle boundary, lying between the Earth's silicate mantle and its metallic outer core
- Continuous marine broadcast, a type of radio station providing marine weather information to coastal areas of Canada

== Arts and entertainment ==
- C.M.B. (album), the debut album of American R&B and pop group Color Me Badd

- Color Me Badd, American R&B and pop group

- C.M.B. (manga), a detective fiction manga by Motohiro Katoui
- CMB Televisión, a religious TV channel in Colombia
- The Cosmic Microwave Background, the debut solo album of Shiny Joe Ryan
- The Combine, the antagonistic alien empire from the Half-Life video game series

== Organizations ==
- Cavalier Marching Band, marching band of the University of Virginia, US
- Center for Mind and Brain, cognitive neuroscience research center at the University of California, US
- China Medical Board, organization promoting medical education and research in China
- China Merchants Bank, bank headquartered in Shenzhen, China
- China Motor Bus, first motor bus company in Hong Kong
- Compagnie Maritime Belge, one of the oldest ship-owners of Antwerp, Belgium
- Compagnie Monégasque de Banque, private bank of Monaco
- Compagnie des Machines Bull, French computer manufacturer
- Union of the Belgian Metal Industry, trade union in Belgium

== Other uses ==
- Bandaranaike International Airport (IATA code: CMB), an airport in Sri Lanka
- Cambodia, UNDP country code
- Cambridge North railway station, British railway station with station code CMB
- Coffee Meets Bagel, a San Francisco–based dating and social networking service
- Cash management bills, a form of security issued by the United States Treasury
- Christus Mansionem Benedicat (English: May Christ Bless This House), text written in chalk on house doors on the day of Epiphany
- Certified Mortgage Banker, a certification offered by the Mortgage Bankers Association
- Coastal Motor Boat, torpedo boats built and used by Britain in both World Wars
- Collin Murray-Boyles (born 2005), an American basketball player for the Toronto Raptors of the National Basketball Association
- Combat Medical Badge, a decoration of the United States Army

== See also ==
- Cell and molecular biology
