= List of Et Cetera characters =

Et Cetera (えとせとら Etosetora^{?}) is an action, adventure, comedy manga written and illustrated by Tow Nakazaki (なかざき 冬Nakazaki Tō^{?}). It is licensed in English by Tokyopop. The first volume was released in August 2004; the final volume was published in April 2007.

This is a list of characters from the manga Et Cetera by Tow Nakazaki. Characters are listed by order of appearance in the storyline.

== Mingchao's Cohort ==
=== Mingchao ===
Mingchao (ミンチャオ, Minchao) is a young, orphaned Chinese girl who lives by herself in the Old West. She dreams of becoming a famous superstar. Her grandfather created the mysterious Eto gun, which she can fire with the number XII that had been branded on her palm accidentally when she was younger. Mingchao has a kind, carefree personality, and can show outstanding courage when her friends are in danger. She is also incredibly fortunate to where Benkate has dubbed her as having the "Devil's Luck" due to her ability to narrowly avoid death or injury. She refuses to kill any person, and often stops others from killing their enemies, no matter how bad they are. This stems from her belief that it is sad whenever someone dies, and that killing someone would make her as bad as the murdering scoundrels she frowns upon. She is very forgiving, even allowing Alternate, a was an enemy, to join the group. Her demeanor makes her likable to others, and she builds friendships easily, even with people who dislike her at first. She shares a special bond with Baskerville (or, as she calls him, "Mr. Priest"), and cares about him deeply. She was the most heartbroken when it was everyone thought he had died, even when knowing he might've been using her. When it was discovered he was still alive, but had amnesia and was working for Blush, she was the only one who had any confidence he would regain his memory. She has never wavered in her faith that he's a good person, even when the others, and even Baskerville himself, didn't believe so. She was so ecstatic when he showed the first signs of remembering her that she didn't care that she was falling several dozen feet into a stormy, raging ocean, and she cried happy tears when they were reunited. It is implied several times that she may have romantic feeling towards him despite their obvious age gap, as pointed out by other characters such as Benkate and Luriele. The only real indication is she seems happiest when he's by her side.

When it became clear how many lives were being ruined by the Syndicate, Mingchao and her friends started trying to find a way to stop it. But it seemed the closer they got to discovering what the Syndicate was, the more it seemed Mingchao's family was connected to it somehow. When the gang reached Manhattan, they soon found themselves battered, injured, and in the heart of the Syndicate, face to face with its leader "Gothic". To Mingchao's horror, he reveals himself as her father. Her father then gloated about his dark, underground exploits and how great it was he'd gained so much power. Mingchao, appalled that she shared this man's blood, grew enraged by his callous referrals to all the misery he caused. Her rage and sadness only amplified when Gothic, discovering his daughter didn't agree with him, mercilessly attacked her comrades. Desperate to stop him, Mingchao, with Baskerville's help, shot him with the Eto gun's powerful dragon bullet and he fell to his death. This made Gothic the first, and probably only, life she willingly took. She had to because she'd lose the people she cared about if she didn't. At the series' end, Mingchao goes off to continue following her dream of achieving stardom, and to her great joy, Baskerville decides to join her.

=== Baskerville ===
After Mingchao saves him from vultures, Baskerville (バスカービル, Basukaabiru) introduces himself as a traveling priest. He displays a deadly prowess with throwing knives. When it is shown that his "Bible" actually carries information on the Eto gun, it becomes obvious his goals are much darker than those of a simple missionary. At first he seems to only be using Mingchao to get the Eto gun, but this changes as he begins to care about her. It is later revealed his real name is Razy (レイジー, Reijii)} and he was a member of The Syndicate, a shady organization that sells drugs and seeks to gather unique guns. The guns they want the most are the Eto and Zodiac guns. It is later shown that Baskerville lost his parents at a young age, leaving him to care for his younger sister, Chisel, whom he doted on. When Chisel fell ill, he joined the Syndicate out of desperation so he could get medicine for her. He gained a reputation as a ruthless killer who showed no mercy, even to children, all for the sake of his sister's health. However, the medicine he was receiving turned out to be a dangerous narcotic that if abused could over time rot the body from the inside out. By the time he learned this it was already too late for Chisel. After Chisel's death, he took on an identity as a wandering priest and started plotting to find and use the Eto gun to kill the Syndicate boss and avenge Chisel. The cross he wears identifies him as a Syndicate member with the engraving of a bride in a wedding dress on the back; however, he now wears the cross in memory of Chisel, as it had been a gift from her. He grows to be devoted to Mingchao; he hates seeing her hurt or cry, and he has wept at the thought of her dying. Because of his affection for her, it becomes a running gag in the series. He is often accused of having a "Lolita-complex", usually by Benkate, and the issue is the subject of a few omakes. Despite his criminal past, he's proven to be a very caring individual. He never goes back on his word once he promises something, and doesn't hesitate to put his life on the line to save his friends, and even people he doesn't know well.

After risking his life to save Mingchao and the others from Gordy, he suffers memory loss when Gordy's gold mine collapses on him, and is later found by Cavanaugh and taken in by Blush. His head injury caused him to suffer from intense headaches that seemed to worsen over time, and Blush starts to offer Baskerville "medicine" for his headaches to make him do his bidding. Unfortunately for Baskerville, he does not remember the medicine is the same drug that led his sister to her death. Eventually, Baskerville becomes so dependent on the addictive narcotic that he starts becoming a mental wreck. He begins following even the most dangerous of Blush's demands to get the "medicine", such as picking up a heated Eto gun from a burning furnace. This ended up branding his hand, enabling him to fire the gun. He is also goaded several times into nearly shooting Mingchao. When he regains his memories, he stops experiencing headaches and stops relying on the drug. Later he travels with Cavanaugh with plans to infiltrate the Syndicate and kill the boss with the Eto gun, so he continues to pretend he has amnesia to divert her suspicion. His plan fails, but he's able to rejoin Mingchao and the others. In the final battle he is given a powerful dose of opium to numb the pain of his injuries so he can help Mingchao. The dose was so powerful that his lifespan is likely shortened. He decides to live out the rest of his life traveling alongside Mingchao and dedicating himself to helping others whose lives have been ruined by the Syndicate.

=== Benkate ===
Benkate (ベンケイト, Benkeito) is a collector of exotic guns. She enters the series having 99 guns in her possession, with a fierce desire to make the Eto gun, and later the Zodiac, the 100th and 101st guns in her collection. Many of her guns are concealed, some of which are even a part of her own clothing, so she is almost never unarmed. Her favorites include two gun earrings, gun boots, a gun designed to look like a cat, a three-barreled multi-directional pistol, and a powerful seven-foot-long folding rifle. She crossed paths with Baskerville in the past while they were looking for the same gun, though she was never aware of his real name or his ties to the Syndicate. She was shocked when she later learned of his past. Apparently the conflict resulted in the two having hostile feelings towards each other until Mingchao forced them to work together. At first glance she's a tall, skinny, somewhat masculine woman with a ruthless disposition who shows no mercy towards anyone who gets between her and a gun she wants, but overtime she shows a more caring side. Like Baskerville, she begins to care about Mingchao as she learns the girl's more endearing and admirable qualities. Her relationship with Baskerville also softens, with the two of them eventually talking like old friends that like to annoy each other but at the same time respect each other. She gets agitated when it is believed that Baskerville was dead and again when she learns he's lost his memory. Despite themselves, they work well together, and Benkate likes to flirt with Baskerville and tease him. She is often paired with Yaghi when the group splits up and has protected him on many occasions. She acts as a sort of substitute big sister to him if Fino isn't around to play her role. In general Benkate shows a soft spot for Yaghi and looks out for his well-being.

She made a promise with Mingchao to never kill again after Mingchao saved her life, and she has kept that promise. She started off in the series having long, bushy hair tied back with a ponytail, but when she gets captured and held hostage, her hair gets hacked off by Cavanaugh. Benkate later expresses annoyance with her new, shorter haircut, though is grateful that she and everyone else is alive. After the series ends she loses her desire for the Eto and Zodiac guns, and instead goes off to search for another gun that might be worthy of holding the 100th place in her collection.

=== Fino ===
Fino (フィノ, Fino) is a teenage Native American girl who wields the Zodiac gun, which uses the essences of the Constellations. At first she doesn't trust Mingchao or the others, but later accepts them as friends. It is later revealed that her distrust of white people comes from when she met Blush as a small child. Her people found Blush in bad shape and Fino helped nurse him back to health. He'd been kind to her and her people and learned about their ways. But when Fino's parents refused to talk about the tribe's sacred treasure, Blush proceeded to murder them in cold blood with his guns, leaving the two children orphans. After that, she grew bitter and developed a hatred for guns and white men, thinking that no one could be trusted except her own people. Ever since then she's wanted revenge against Blush for deceiving her and ruining her family. She is the most cautious of the group and has a hard time trusting others. She is also a vegetarian.

She had been opposed to Alternate joining the team because he'd been so easily deceived by Blush. It wasn't until he saved her and the others from a monopolizing gang that she finally accepted him. He saves her yet again from Cavanaugh, taking a direct hit from the Eto gun in the process. At one point, she makes him an Indian-styled outfit after his shirt had been ruined. By the end of the series it seemed that Fino had started to care for him, and it is possible that she's developed romantic feelings for him. She and Alternate can relate to one another since his father was also killed by Blush, and thus both share a common goal of wanting to bring Blush to justice. After the Syndicate is dissolved, she decides to travel with Alternate to track down Blush.

=== Yaghi ===
Yaghi (ヤギ, Yagi) is Fino's younger brother. He is more trusting and outgoing than his sister. He's very adventurous and cares about his sister a lot. After Benkate saves his life, he starts hanging around her more and looks up to her, and she in turn looks out for him. An omake drawn by one of Nakazaki's assistants shows that Yaghi dreams of one day making Benkate his wife, though he fears his sister wouldn't approve. Yaghi is very talkative and friendly to other people, which makes him likable to others. However, he is sometimes too trusting, as once he allowed the Zodiac to be taken away while his sister was taking a bath. Yaghi is also incredibly brave for his age and is willing to do anything for people he cares about, though this causes worry for Fino since it puts him at risk of being hurt. A testament to his bravery is how he willingly stayed behind with Benkate to help her hold off a band of hooligans in order to let Mingchao and the others get away, despite the danger it put him in. At the end of the series he went with Fino and Alternate to return to his village.

=== Alternate ===
Alternate (オルタネート, Orutanēto) is the first recurring antagonist, who later becomes a hero. He is intelligent and a decent gunman, and is identified by the monocle he wears over his left eye. He wants to get his hands on the Eto gun, and makes several failed attempts to do so. His father, Gordy, a member of the Syndicate, is betrayed and murdered by fellow member Blush. Blush then told Alternate that Mingchao had done it. He becomes obsessed with revenge and is tricked into obeying Blush. Upon learning Blush was the true killer, Alternate assists the others in saving Mingchao from Blush. From then on he vows to find and punish Blush for what he did. When he wants to join the others, all seem to oppose the idea except Mingchao. After rescuing Fino, Yaghi, and Big, the others accept him as well.

Alternate had a very lonely life, as he was almost the polar opposite of Mingchao. He would lie, cheat, and hurt people to get what he wanted. Because of this, he had never had a single friend. However, like many of the other characters, he begins to change under Mingchao's influence, and his true personality eventually comes out. He is somewhat insecure, partly due to guilt and a disbelief that he'll be forgiven for all the trouble he caused. But he has proven to be brave in the face of danger, willing put his life on the line to defend his friends. He seems to have grown to care a lot for Fino, and possibly has romantic feelings for her. He ends up saving her life twice, once taking a bullet in the chest from the Eto gun for her. She seems to reciprocate these feelings at least in part, when she makes him a new shirt after his old one is ruined. She also expresses worry after he is injured saving her. He goes off with Fino and Yaghi when the gang splits up at the end.

== The Syndicate ==
=== Bokassy ===
Bokassy is an information broker and a member of the Syndicate. Baskerville goes to him to get information on the Eto gun. Baskerville knows Bokassy but Bokassy doesn't recognize him until later on. When Bokassy finds out the Eto gun is in town, he tries to have Baskerville and Benkate murdered to gain access to the gun, but he fails. He then tells Alternate about the gun, calling him "Master Alternate", indicating some kind of superior-subordinate relationship with him, even though Alternate isn't with the Syndicate. Bokassy disappears and is likely dead after falling off a runaway train.

=== Gordy ===
Gordy is a member of the Syndicate who digs a gold mine in a mountain Fino's tribe regards as sacred. He is ruthless and mean, even towards Alternate, his own son. He is territorial to where he will attack anyone who comes close to his mine. A tall and muscular man, Gordy is greedy and wears a lot of gold jewelry, as well as armor made of gold under his clothes. Concept art for Gordy showed him as shorter and more slender, but Nakazaki admitted he liked drawing "buff guys", and so Gordy's final design was muscular.

Gordy tries to trap Mingchao and her friends in his mine to steal the Eto gun, and the ensuing fight uncovers the location of the tribe's sacred treasure, which turns out to be the Zodiac gun. Gordy also blows Baskerville's cover as a priest, devastating Mingchao. He tries to kill everyone to get his hands on the tribe's sacred "treasure", but is subdued by Fino's Pisces bullet. Mingchao then stops Fino from killing him with a tomahawk. When Gordy regains consciousness, he encounters Blush and tells him about the Eto gun. In return, Blush murders him to eliminate the competition.

=== Blush ===
Blush (ブラッシュ, Burasshu) is a member of the Syndicate. He is sneaky, manipulative, and cruel. He killed Fino's parents as well as Gordy, Alternate's father, and tricked Alternate into thinking that Mingchao had done it. He used both Alternate and Baskerville to try to get his way, but ultimately did not succeed as he was later duped by Cavanaugh. He despises Cavanaugh despite her being his superior in the Syndicate. He claims she took credit for one of his reports and stole his bonus. After she tricks him he tries to bring her down, even when it meant helping out Mingchao briefly. He is noted for his ability to fire up to twelve bullets at once with his two guns.

Blush disappears after Cavanaugh's attack on the ship heading for New York City. At the end of the story, an omake by one of Nakazaki's assistants jokes that Blush was killed by the giant energy wave created by the Eto gun's dragon bullet. However, Blush's whereabouts are unknown and he is still at large.

Concept art shows a female version of Blush, as Tow Nakazaki had been unsure whether he wanted Blush to be male or female. He eventually settled on a male character.

=== Cavanaugh P. Script ===
Cavanaugh (キャバナー, Kabanā) is a high-ranking member of the Syndicate and considered to be one of the most feared and cruel of them all. Blush calls her "the crazy wench". She at first appears to be an authoritative figure with the ability to hold a stern hand over her peers, but she is sadistic, calculating, and controlling. She becomes increasingly sociopathic and violent as the story progresses, and her obsession with killing Mingchao and her companions escalates. She had found Baskerville after he'd lost his memory. After Blush took him and she discovered Baskerville could fire the Eto gun, she sought to bring him to her side. She used a concentrated form of a potent drug to convince Baskerville to do her bidding, though he defected after his memory returned. She loses her right eye in a train accident resulting from a gunfight between herself, Baskerville, and Mingchao's friends. Following the injury she swears revenge against them for scarring her face. She brands XII into her palm so she is able to use the Eto gun, though the brand later gets destroyed when her hand is scarred by a shot from the Zodiac gun. She is killed after falling from a high flight of stairs in a battle with Mingchao and her friends.

=== Futura ===
Futura is a member of the Syndicate and a magician. He first appears on the Syndicate-owned ship heading for New York out of Los Angeles. He uses magic to entertain guests, but also for more sinister reasons. He tricks Yaghi into giving him the Zodiac by amusing the boy with magic tricks. In the midst of their escape, Cavanaugh orders Futura to burn the Zodiac's brand on his hand so he and Baskerville can create a double cow bullet against the ship. He does it, but is later knocked out of the hot air balloon they are in and falls to his death in the ocean. Futura is one of three people who was able to use the Zodiac, along with Fino and Gothic.

=== Bearded Ina ===
Bearded Ina was a friend of Mingchao's grandfather, but he is also a member of the Syndicate. Both he and Mingchao's grandfather emigrated from China because they were disturbed by how badly the opium trade had ravaged their fellow countrymen. They took with them a large stash of opium with the original intent on destroying it, but then decided to try researching ways to make it into a safe medicine. When they failed, they hid the drugs in a cavern beneath New York City. Since the both of them were blacksmiths, they decided to create a pair of magic guns that when brought together would create a mystical map leading to the location of the drugs. Bearded Ina is responsible for the creation of the two guns, and had the brand of the Eto gun on his right palm. However, after Gothic's wife died and he started gaining power, Bearded Ina helped his friend and the infant Mingchao escape the clutches of the Syndicate. Afterwards, he burned off his right hand to keep his ability to use the gun from falling into the wrong hands, and it was replaced with a prosthetic hand. But he continued to work with the Syndicate, using his medicine shop's basement as the place where the drugs are transported to Bedloe's Island by a tunnel. This is the only reason the Syndicate spared his life.

When he finally meets Mingchao again, he pretends not to know her, but he's only pretending so he can protect her. Mingchao wholeheartedly believes Bearded Ina is on her side, but he locks her in his basement, saying he'll turn her in to Cavanaugh. It turns out he was trying to show her the way to the Syndicate's base, through his basement. Later Bearded Ina shows up again to help Benkate and Yaghi outside the Black Goddess statue that is the Syndicate's base.

During the final battle against Gothic, Bearded Ina gives Baskerville a pill that is a concentrated form of opium, saying it will numb Baskerville's wounds so he can help Mingchao against her father. He then gives Baskerville the secret to defeating Gothic. Afterwards, he dies, because Gothic shot him when he shielded Mingchao from the bullets.

=== Gothic ===
Gothic is the boss of the Syndicate as well as Mingchao's father. He wants to rule all of the United States in revenge for the death of his wife, Mingchao's mother, who died because she couldn't get proper medical treatment as a Chinese immigrant in America. He bleached his hair, damaged his vocal cords to change his voice, and wore a mask to disguise that he was actually Chinese. Mingchao declared that neither he nor she should exist, and he is the first and probably only life she takes, if only to put a stop to the misery he's caused others. He is ultimately killed by the Eto gun's dragon bullet.

== Other characters ==
=== Grandpa ===
Mingchao often describes her grandfather as an unfriendly old man and she doesn't seem to remember him very fondly. However, the fact that he escaped New York City with her shows that he probably cared for her a great deal. He was a skilled blacksmith and along with Bearded Ina created the Eto and Zodiac guns. He finished the guns on his way out West, dropping the Zodiac gun off at Fino's village and then taking the Eto gun with him to the mountain where he settled with Mingchao. He left the Eto gun with Mingchao after he died, but sometimes appears to her as a ghost in her dreams to give her tips about how the gun works.

Mingchao's grandfather is also Gothic's father. Gothic accused him and Bearded Ina of hoarding an enormous stash of drugs to use for profit at a later time, when really the two were hoping to use the stash to experiment creating safe medicines. When the plan failed, they kept the drugs hidden and created the Eto and Zodiac guns to act as a mystical map to the drugs when the two guns are brought together.

In the end, Mingchao's grandfather tells her about Gothic's true motives for wanting to take control of America.

=== Suhbo ===
Suhbo is a boy around Mingchao's age. She and Baskeville help him save his family's ranch from Phineas Franklin and his henchmen. He and Mingchao don't get along well because she tries to eat one of his dairy cows. His mother's name is Sasha, whom Baskerville seems to have affection for.

=== Phineas Franklin ===
Phineas Franklin is a cruel businessman. He harasses Suhbo and his mother to make them give up their ranch, and plans to have a monopoly over the cattle business in the state. He kidnaps Suhbo and holds him hostage to force Sasha gives him the deed to her ranch. Mingchao defeats him and his cronies using an ox bullet. He again returns to the story to take over Big's fishing business, but Fino puts him out with a Pisces bullet.

=== Bodney ===
Bodney is a popular saloon dancer. Her boyfriend was Kaufman, but she broke up with him over his drinking habit. She is an excellent gambler and manages to win the Eto gun in a poker game. Baskerville challenges her to get the gun back, but their game is interrupted by Kaufman. When Kaufman kidnaps Mingchao for money, Bodney goes to help her, which ends in Mingchao using Bodney's tiger fur underwear to power a tiger bullet and stop Kaufman from killing the dancer. After the fight, Bodney stays to help Kaufman heal from his wounds.

=== Kaufman ===
Kaufman is Bodney's ex-boyfriend, but he's still in love with Bodney to the point of obsession. He developed a drinking habit because he was cheated out of his life's savings in a poker game. He used to be a good and decent man, but after losing his money he became combative and mean towards others, and Bodney couldn't stand it so she broke off their relationship. Kaufman gets extremely jealous when other men give Bodney attention, so when he sees Baskerville playing a poker game with her he explodes and kidnaps Mingchao, saying he wants money in return for the girl. When Bodney arrives to help Mingchao, Kaufman tries to convince her to get back together with him, but she refuses. This enrages him and he plans on killing her and then himself, but he's stopped by Mingchao's tiger bullet. He's hit in the throat, and Bodney chooses to take care of him in the end, since Kaufman can't drink alcohol with his throat injury.

=== Luriele ===
Luriele is a young performer who befriends Mingchao on a train heading for Hollywood. She couldn't use her legs due to an accident that left her too afraid to walk on her own again. It left her so depressed that she believed she would never dance again, and even wanted to give Mingchao her dresses. With Mingchao's encouragement she eventually learns how to walk again. After an incident on a runaway train (thanks to Alternate), Luriele invites Mingchao and her friends to join the troupe in a performance at a nearby town. It is during the performance that Mingchao discovers she herself is tone-deaf.

=== Typus ===
Typus is a priest whom Mingchao at first mistakes as Baskerville because of his black clothes, even though Typus is much shorter. He invites the gang to stay at his home. When he tries to steal the Eto gun, the friends find out he's really working for Blush, but only because Blush is holding his daughter Coronet hostage. In the past, Typus was a soldier alongside Blush, killing Indians and destroying their villages. He was so ashamed, he left the military to marry and become a priest. Fino is enraged by Typus’ past and at first refuses to help him save Coronet until she realizes she'll be just as bad as Blush if Coronet dies. In the end, Typus mentions helping a man with Baskerville's description, saying he might be in Las Vegas.

=== Chisel ===
Chisel was Baskerville's younger sister. She was gravely ill, so Baskerville joined the Syndicate to help get her the medicine she needed. The "medicine" was just a nasty narcotic that made her symptoms worse, but Baskerville didn't realize it until he overheard Cavanaugh and Gothic talking about how she would die. Unlike her brother, Chisel believed in God and spent time in prayer. She gave Baskerville the cross he wears, the one he had engraved with the wedding dress relief. Chisel didn't know about how he was getting the medicine, thinking he was just working hard somewhere. She loved Baskerville very much, and after her death Baskerville vowed revenge against the Syndicate. He buried Chisel near their home.

=== Big ===
Big is a fisherman who makes a living selling fish. One day he accidentally catches Mingchao in his net after she fell off a hot air balloon and into the ocean. When she is reunited with her friends, they thank Big by helping him with his business. Phineas Franklin returns and with his sights set on the fishing industry. Fino defeats Franklin using a Pisces bullet powered by a flying fish, saving Big's business. Big is an amiable person, and Alternate takes a liking to him because Big is a large man who reminds him of Gordy.

=== The Narls Brothers ===
The Narls Brothers are twin brothers who run a stagecoach business. Their first names were never disclosed. One brother is more talkative than the other, and he likes to remind everyone how fast and cheap their stagecoach rides are. The brothers pick up Mingchao and her friends to help them catch up to the train that's carrying Cavanaugh and Baskerville. Fino uses their hair to power a Gemini bullet.

=== Gocal ===
Gocal runs a restaurant not far from New York City and invites Mingchao and her friends to stay with him. The bank has been trying to get Gocal to give up the property, claiming the land had been loaned to him, when really no one had owned the land previously. Arnold, the banker, creates a ruckus in the restaurant and tries to threaten Gocal to give up the land, but Mingchao defeats him with a snake bullet.

=== Yoshille ===
Yoshille is a young man living near New York City with his father Gocal and his younger sister Cornelia. He is working for the Syndicate as a drug runner, but doesn't realize the "cargo" he carries is actually drugs. Since his sister is sick, he is trying to earn "medicine" to make her well, similar to what Baskerville did for Chisel. After he tries to steal the Eto gun for Cavanaugh, he finds out the truth about the drugs and burns the cargo he was transporting. He then gives Mingchao and her friends the information they need to get inside the Syndicate's base.
