= Mikuru =

- Gender: Female

Origin
- Origin: Japanese
- Meaning: Different meanings depending on the kanji used

Mikuru (written: 未来) is a feminine Japanese given name. Notable people with the name include:

- Mikuru Asakura (朝倉 未来; born 1992), Japanese mixed martial artist
- Mikuru Suzuki (鈴木 未来; born 1982), Japanese darts player
- Mikuru Uchino (内野 未来; born 1988), Japanese gravure idol

== Fictional characters ==
- Mikuru Asahina (朝比奈 みくる), a character in the light novel series Haruhi Suzumiya
