= Uchino =

Uchino (written: 内野) is a Japanese surname. Notable people with the surname include:

- Kenji Uchino (内野 研二, born 1950), American engineer
- Masao Uchino (内野 正雄, born 1934), Japanese footballer and manager
- Mikuru Uchino (内野 未来, born 1988), Japanese gravure idol
- Seiyō Uchino (内野 聖陽, born 1968), Japanese actor
- Shigeaki Uchino (内野 重昭, born 1931), Japanese modern pentathlete
- Takashi Uchino (footballer, born 1988) (内野 貴志), Japanese footballer
- Takashi Uchino (footballer, born 2001) (内野 貴史), Japanese footballer
- Tsunehisa Uchino (内野 経久, born 1965), Japanese sprint canoeist

== See also ==
- 11929 Uchino, a main-belt asteroid
- Uchino Station, a railway station in Niigata, Niigata Prefecture, Japan
