= Yoshito =

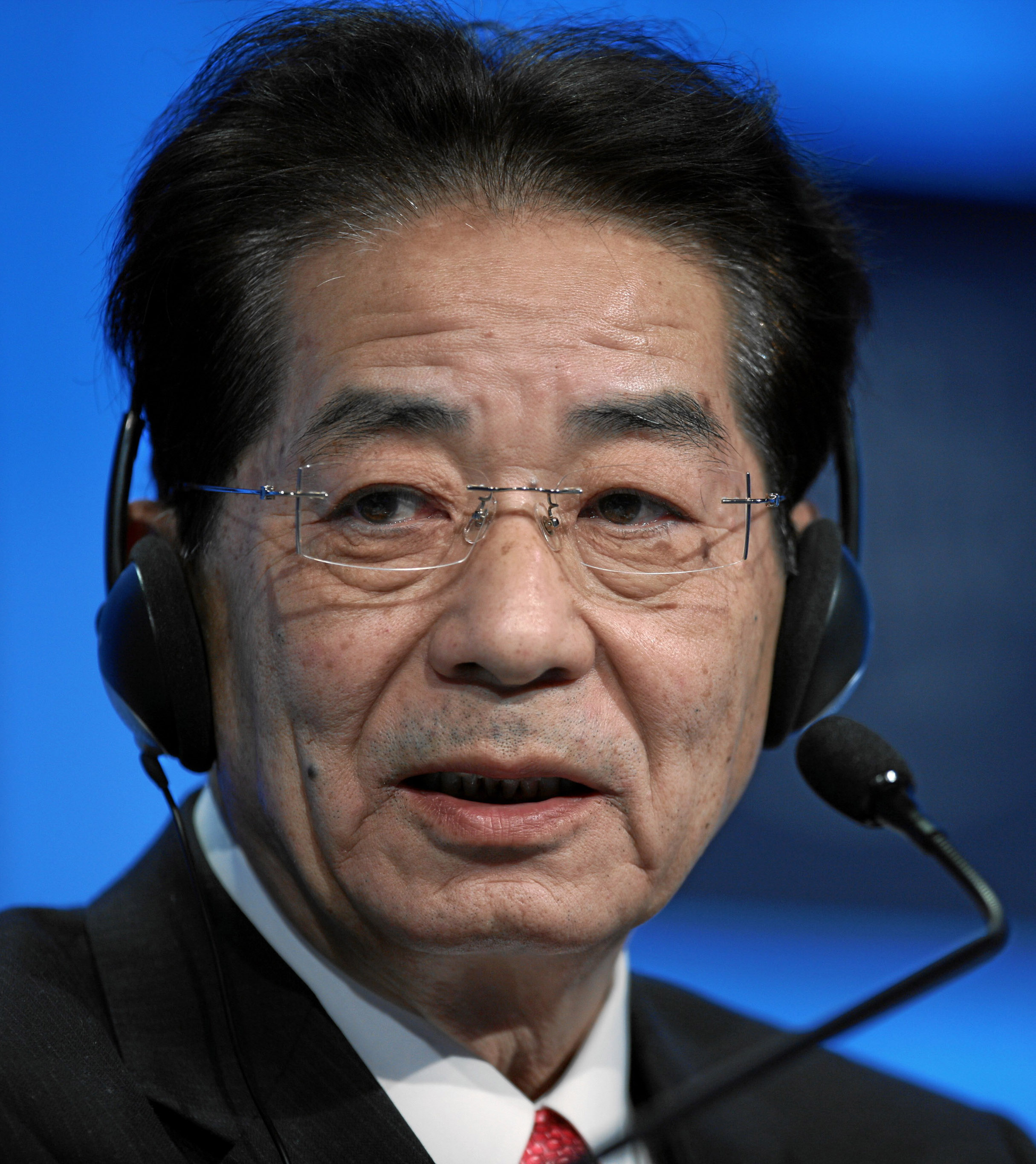
- Yoshito Sengoku, Japanese politician, 2010
- Pronunciation: joɕito (IPA)
- Gender: Male

Origin
- Origin: Japanese
- Meaning: Different meanings depending on the kanji used

Other names
- Alternative spelling: Yosito (Kunrei-shiki) Yosito (Nihon-shiki) Yoshito (Hepburn)

Yoshito is a masculine Japanese given name.

== Written forms ==
Yoshito can be written using different combinations of kanji characters. Here are some examples:

- 義人, "justice, person"
- 儀人, "ceremony, person"
- 佳人, "good, person"
- 嘉人, "auspicious, person"
- 好人, "pleasing, person"
- 吉人, "good luck, person"
- 吉斗, "good luck, Big Dipper"
- 芳人, "fragrant/virtuous, person"
- 善人, "virtuous, person"
- 良人, "good, person"
- 能人, "capacity, person"
- 由人, "reason, person"
- 与志人, "give, determination, person"
- 禎人, "blessed, person"
- 禎斗, "blessed, Big Dipper"

The name can also be written in hiragana よしと or katakana ヨシト.

== Notable people with the name ==
- Yoshito Higuchi (樋口 義人), Japanese video game producer
- Yoshito Kishi (岸 義人; born 1937), Japanese chemist
- Yoshito Matsushige (松重 美人; 1913 – 2005), Japanese photojournalist
- Yoshito Okubo (大久保 嘉人; born 1982), Japanese footballer
- Yoshito Sengoku (仙谷 由人; 1946 – 2018), Japanese politician
- Yoshito Sugamoto (菅本 儀人; born 1973), Japanese wrestler
- Yoshito Takamine (1924 – 2015), Japanese-American politician
- Yoshito Terakawa (寺川 能人; born 1974), Japanese footballer
- Yoshito Usui (臼井 儀人; 1958 – 2009), Japanese manga artist
- Yoshito Yahagi (矢作 芳人; born 1961), Japanese horse trainer
- Yoshito Yamahara (山原 義人; born 1963), Japanese manga artist
- Yoshito Yasuhara (安原 義人; born 1949), Japanese voice actor
