= Ikenai Luna Sensei! =

Manga series

いけない!ルナ先生
- Manga
- Written by: Kamimura Sumiko
- Published by: Kodansha
- Magazine: Monthly Shōnen Magazine
- Original run: 1986 – 1988
- Volumes: 5

Ikenai Luna Sensei! (いけない!ルナ先生; "Watch-out! Luna, the Teacher", also known as Bad School Mistress Luna!) is a Japanese manga series written and illustrated by Kamimura Sumiko. It was serialized in Kodansha's Monthly Shōnen Magazine from 1986 to 1988. Because of the sexual content the series was one of the manga placed on "Harmful manga" lists by local and national governmental agencies. The negative publicity resulted in Kodansha discontinuing the series.

In 2014 a live-action version of the manga, starring Mikuru Uchino, Aimi Yoshikawa and Megu Fujiura, was produced by SPO Entertainment.

In 2025, a new edition of the manga, Ikenai Luna Sensei! R (いけない!ルナ先生R) was released, where the original story was reillustrated with new imagery.

== Volume list ==
No.	Japanese release date	Japanese ISBN
1	April 13, 1987	978-4-06-302207-0
2	July 14, 1987	978-4-06-302215-5
3	October 12, 1987	978-4-06-302223-0
4	March 14, 1988	978-4-06-302235-3
5	July 12, 1988	978-4-06-302245-2
