= Dorahachi =

Japanese manga series

- First tankōbon volume cover

ドラハチ
- Genre: Sports (baseball)
- Manga
- Written by: Yū Ajina
- Illustrated by: Hayato Natsukawa
- Published by: Kodansha
- Imprint: Monthly Shōnen Magazine Comics
- Magazine: Monthly Shōnen Magazine; (January 6 – December 6, 2023); Magazine Pocket; (January 3, 2024 – present)
- Original run: January 6, 2023 – present
- Volumes: 11

Dorahachi (ドラハチ) is a Japanese manga series written by Yū Ajina and illustrated by Hayato Natsukawa. It originally began serialization in Kodansha's Monthly Shōnen Magazine in January 2023, before transferring to Kodansha's Magazine Pocket service in January 2024. The series has been compiled into eleven volumes as of October 2026.

== Plot ==
Hachirō Kurogane, an 18-year-old baseball player, is drafted out of high school by the Carbons, a team with a long-time reputation for losing. During his introductory press conference, Hachirō reveals his intention to be season MVP, a difficult task for any player, let alone a rookie. This is because of a promise he made with his childhood friend Suzu Domon, who rejected his confession but said she would reconsider if he ever achieved those goals. With his dedication and goals in mind, Hachirō aims to bring the Carbons to glory and to make the playoffs once again, with the ultimate goal of winning the championship.

== Characters ==
Hachirō Kurogane (黒金 八郎, Kurogane Hachirō)
An 18-year-old catcher for the Carbons. After joining the team as the 8th pick in the draft, he initially aims to make it to the main team. He aims to become season MVP and to help the Carbons win the championship. He later becomes an opening catcher.
Suzu Domon (土門 鈴, Domon Suzu)
Hachirō's childhood friend and childhood crush. He had confessed to her, only for her to turn him down. However, she gave him conditions for her to accept his feelings, which inspires his baseball career goals. Her father Daiya was a player for the Carbons, having led the team in its previous golden age, and declining following his retirement.

== Publication ==
The series is written by Yū Ajina and illustrated by Hayato Natsukawa, who originally serialized it in Kodansha's Monthly Shōnen Magazine. The series began on January 6, 2023, with the first tankōbon volume being released on June 15, 2023. Originally serialized on a monthly basis, the series moved to Kodansha's Magazine Pocket service on January 3, 2024, moving to a biweekly schedule. Eleven volumes have been released as of October 16, 2026.

No.	Release date	ISBN
1	June 15, 2023	978-4-06-531337-4
2	September 14, 2023	978-4-06-533079-1
3	January 17, 2024	978-4-06-534261-9
4	May 16, 2024	978-4-06-535621-0
5	September 17, 2024	978-4-06-536610-3
6	January 17, 2025	978-4-06-537798-7
7	May 16, 2025	978-4-06-539301-7
8	September 17, 2025	978-4-06-540907-7
9	February 17, 2026	978-4-06-542414-8
10	June 17, 2026	978-4-06-543715-5
11	October 16, 2026	978-4-06-544601-0

== Reception ==
Writing for the Nikkan Spa! website, baseball manga critic Yoshihisa Tsukui and Shinji Mizushima expert Naoto Oguma included the series in a top three list of baseball manga for 2024, positively comparing it to Mizushima's manga series Stopper and saying that it had the potential to be a Stopper for the Reiwa era.
