= Ironfist Chinmi =

Japanese manga series

- Cover of the first manga volume.

鉄拳チンミ (Tekken Chinmi)
- Genre: Action, Comedy, Adventure, Sports, Martial Arts
- Manga
- Written by: Takeshi Maekawa
- Published by: Kodansha
- English publisher: UK: Bloomsbury
- Magazine: Monthly Shōnen Magazine
- Original run: December 1983 – February 1997
- Volumes: 35
- Anime television series
- Directed by: Jutaro Oba
- Produced by: Masayoshi Kawada (TV Asahi); Kori Yoritsune (Toho); Hiroshi Kato (Ashi)
- Written by: Junki Takegami
- Music by: Kei Wakakusa
- Studio: Ashi Productions
- Original network: ANN (TV Asahi)
- Original run: July 2, 1988 – December 24, 1988
- Episodes: 20
- Manga

Shin Tekken Chinmi
- Written by: Takeshi Maekawa
- Published by: Kodansha
- Magazine: Monthly Shōnen Magazine
- Original run: March 1997 – November 2004
- Volumes: 20
- Manga

Tekken Chinmi Legends
- Written by: Takeshi Maekawa
- Published by: Kodansha
- Magazine: Monthly Shōnen Magazine
- Original run: September 2006 – present
- Volumes: 28

Ironfist Chinmi (Japanese: 鉄拳チンミ, Hepburn: Tekken Chinmi) is a Japanese manga series written and illustrated by Takeshi Maekawa. It was published by Kodansha in Monthly Shōnen Magazine from 1983 to 1997 and collected in 35 tankōbon volumes. It is centered on the story of a boy called Chinmi who learns Kung Fu by fighting progressively more challenging foes.

This is the first and most widely published series of Ironfist Chinmi. Published as Tekken Chinmi in Japanese and Ironfist Chinmi in English. A part of this series was published by Bloomsbury UK and is still available from some online/physical book stores. The entire series was published by Kodansha in Japan, and Elex Media Komputindo in Indonesia. The series was also adapted as an anime television series in 1988, which was dubbed in English in the early 1990s as Kung Fu Boy and into Arabic as "Madrasat Al-Kung Fu" (Kung Fu School). In Indonesia, the series known as Kungfu Boy.

In 1987, the manga won the Kodansha Manga Award for shōnen manga.

It was followed by two sequel series, New Ironfist Chinmi and Ironfist Chinmi Legends.

== Characters ==
Chinmi (チンミ)
The main protagonist, a highly skilled martial artist and noble individual, who receives martial arts training from Dairin Temple and various other masters along the way. Chinmi helps anyone in need without asking for anything in return. Chinmi risks his life on countless occasions in the defense of others. His signature technique is the Tsuuhaiken (通背拳, lit. 'pass-through, back, fist'), which he uses in various situations throughout his journeys. Chinmi is known to have a pure heart, not corrupted by greed.
Goku (悟空)
Chinmi's pet monkey and best animal friend since early childhood, named after the Monkey King Sun Wukong. Goku constantly accompanies Chinmi in all of his adventures, often stepping in at the right moment to save Chinmi's life. Goku is very dexterous and intelligent. He and Chinmi developed their own style of martial arts, the 'Monkey Fist'.
Mei Lin (美琳)
Chinmi's sister who has a small restaurant business in her home town. Chinmi initially helps her run the restaurant until he went to Dairin Temple. She was married at the end of vol 29.
Jin Tan & Bi Kei
Chinmi's friends and co-disciples at the Dairin Temple. They were initially more like antagonists until they develop a close friendship with Chinmi. They help each other in local affairs ever since and have saved each other's lives on multiple occasions. Whenever Chinmi is away on assignments, they are often the substitute teacher for his disciples.
Old Master/Roushi (老師)
A master who acts as Chinmi's guide and mentor. He finds Chinmi and identifies him as the "Magic Fist" after seeing a birth-mark on his forehead. He invites Chinmi to come to Dairin Temple to learn more. He constantly supports Chinmi during his difficult training, and often provides additional training personally. He revealed to Chinmi Dairin Temple's forbidden move.
High Priest (大僧正)
Head Monk at the Dairin Temple, and wisest and most respected master in the region. He is respectfully called High Priest/Daisojo by disciples and instructors alike, and rarely by name directly. He rarely uses his martial arts abilities, and is generally seen discussing philosophical aspects with the Old Master. He perceives the long-term benefits of events, such as how the flash flood that affected the nearby village would help villagers understand the true value of peace.
Yan (艳)
A village girl that Chinmi saves from kidnappers, and later from a flood that hits the village. She is the primary love interest of Chinmi in the series, and is well known to share a deep bond with him. Yan is approximately the same age as Chinmi, and is a major recurring character.
Ryukai
Chinmi's immediate master within the Dairin Temple, and a master of Ki (or Chi), which he uses to strengthen his body and gain immense strength. He trains Chinmi for many years, and after Chinmi surpasses him, he says its what makes training a disciple worthwhile. He is one of the most highly respected instructors within the Dairin Temple.
Riki
Resident staff expert of Dairin Temple; Riki teaches Chinmi the staff (棍法, konpo). Blind since birth, Riki has developed his other senses to high level and train them to be his 'eyes'. He was a student of Master Soshou.
Master Soshu
A wise and revered staff expert and teacher of Riki and Shii Fan. Shii Fan considered him to be his father figure.
Shii Fan (シーファン)
A young Konpo master and protégé of Master Soshu, whom Chinmi met when he has studying under Riki. They develop a strong friendship and rivalry after their first encounter. Shii Fan was kidnapped and brainwashed as an assassin by a vengeful acupuncturist with a grudge on the Chinese Emperor. Planted to assassinate the Emperor during the Annual Emperial Martial Arts tournament, Shii Fan became cold and merciless in his bouts and nearly killed Chinmi in the climatic final battle. However, Chinmi managed to 'wake him up' from his trance and managed to thwart the assassination attempt. Later, Shii Fan was summoned to accompany Chinmi and Tan Tan as spies for the Emperor in the Chinese Navy. His self-taught signature move is the Spinning Staff (捻糸棍, Nen Shi Kon).
You Sen
A revered kung fu master, and former martial artist under Dairin Temple. The first to master Dairin temple's forbidden move, the Thunder God fist. He takes Chinmi under his wing, albeit reluctantly. Despite being respected by the local townsfolk, You Sen has an excessive drinking problem, and developed liver cirrhosis. Aware of his soon to be demise, he taught Chinmi his signature move, the Tsuuhaiken. He witnessed Chinmi mastered the technique just before he breathed his last.
General Ourin
Commander-in-chief of the Chinese Army. First met Chinmi during the Battle of Najiru. He becomes a recurring character after the Martial Arts tournament saga, and often asks for many favors from Chinmi.
Renka
The young daughter of General Ourin. She was acquainted with Chinmi during the Tenran Martial Arts Tournament, as he was staying at the Ourin home. She becomes smitten with Chinmi and went to great lengths to see him again, including sneaking behind her father's entourage to go to Dairin Temple. Initially she was jealous of Yan's relationship with Chinmi, but changed her attitude as she witnessed their bond during a flood disaster, and she went on to become Chinmi's unofficial biographer.
Tan Tan (タンタン)
A youth expert on Nantou Round-Kick martial arts (円脚拳, Nantou Enkyaku Ken; lit. 'circle/round, kick technique'). The technique was developed by his grandfather, a former Emperial Martial Arts finalist who lost his arms in the final bout. Due to the constant mocking by his fellow villagers, Tan Tan was determined to win the martial arts tournament to earn their respect. However, he was beaten by Chinmi in a grueling battle. Despite his lost, Tan Tan became a close friend of Chinmi and helped him thwart the assassination attempt on the emperor. He was later summoned to accompany Chinmi and Shii Fan as spies for the Emperor in the Chinese Navy. Although initially cocky, Tan Tan became more humble and mature after the Navy saga.
Gunte
Chinmi's leading disciple and a talented Kenpo artist. He and Chinmi have left Dairin Temple to tour various cities, and offer demonstrations of Dairin Temple Kenpo. Initially Gunte was a rebellious teen from a small town. However, after Chinmi and his fellow disciples helped him save his home town from nomadic bandits, and being pulled into the Princess Mito incident, Gunte became much more mature and wise.

=== Dairin Temple (大林寺) ===
Center of most of the activities, and the place Chinmi was formally taught martial arts. It is similar to the Chinese Shaolin temples and its culture. Known as the birthplace of Dairin Kenpo (大林 拳法, 'Dairin fist'), and located near Nankou Mountain. Headed by the High Priest, students and teachers train, eat and sleep within the Temple's grounds. Dairin Kenpo consists mainly of unarmed combat, and the only weapon training provided is with the staff. Master Riki is the resident staff expert, and is highly perceptive despite being completely blind. Chinmi, his disciples, his masters Ryukai, Riki, and Old Master/Roushi live and train within Dairin Temple.

Chinmi initially joins Dairin Temple at the age of ~10, but as his capabilities and qualities improve, at the age of ~20 he is promoted to instructor, and given a small group of students to train. His students are San-Chuu, Yukke, Kuppa, Nam-Uru, Yonfa, Koyuu and Gunte. Jin Tan is also often described as Chinmi's student.

== Tekken Chinmi ==
Chinmi is a young Chinese boy who was helping his sister in small restaurant business. He is talented in martial arts, and used to play with his pet monkey named Goku in the forests, giving him great agility. After defeating people who harasses his sister's restaurant, an old master (usually referred as 'Old Man/Rōshi') witnessed his talent. Believing Chinmi is the one prophesied to become a great master of martial arts, Rōshi arranged for him to train at Dairin Temple. From there, Chinmi learned Kung Fu, or Dairin Kenpo. It spans from the first to the sixth volume.

Starting from the sixth volume, Chinmi starts learning weapon-based Martial arts, the staff from Riki. He gained a friendly rival, Shii Fan. Chinmi's staff training saga ends at the 8th volume, which continues with the next saga about training with the revered Master You Sen. Chinmi learned his signature move, the "Tsuuhaiken" from Master You Sen just before he died, and Chinmi prompted to go on a journey to master his skills.

The journey spans in many volumes, but starting on the 23rd volume, Chinmi was forced to return to Dairin Temple after the temple was desecrated by a former apprentice of You Sen, the ruthless prodigal Oudow. Chinmi tasted true defeat for the first time against Oudow, but later the old Master/Roushi told him the secret of Dairin Temple's forbidden move: the Thunder God Fist (雷神拳, Raijin Ken), one that could instantly kill the victim. Despite his best efforts, Chinmi is cornered and used the forbidden move, crippling Oudow. Believing he just violated the sanctity of Dairin by killing his opponent, Chinmi goes on a self-imposed exile. Fortunately for him, he found out that Oudow actually survived and as a result softened his attitude, enabling Chinmi to truly return to the Temple. He is later promoted to teacher.

As a teacher, Chinmi garnered a group of students, including the rebellious Gunte; though he later becomes enchanted with Chinmi's bravery and virtue to actually be more tolerant with his fellow students. After reacquainting with his students, Chinmi was thrust into the next saga where he fought the Wind Wolves army of horsemen (Fictional race based on the nomadic Mongolian and Manchurian tribes), who set their sights on Gunte's hometown. His deeds were noticed by the general of Chinese army and invited him to meet the Emperor.

En route to the capital, Chinmi attended his sister's wedding. The Emperor invites him to participate in the upcoming annual national tournament of martial arts. While boarding with General Ourin's family, he developed a close friendship with the General's daughter, Renka. As the tournament begins, Chinmi was reunited with Shii Fan, but it turns out that he was brainwashed by an assassin who plotted to use him to kill the Emperor. Chinmi also befriended Tan Tan, a youth expert in martial arts solely based on kicking. Chinmi and Shii Fan reached the tournament finals. Shii Fan's puppet master, Sinsai, kidnapped Renka and blackmailed Chinmi. Tan Tan inadvertently overhears the plot and rescued Renka, allowing Chinmi to restore Shii Fan's mind in the final battle and foiling the assassin's plot to kill the Emperor. Chinmi ended up as the champion and returned to the Dairin Temple. The first series of the manga ended there.

== New Ironfist Chinmi ==
New Ironfist Chinmi (Shin Tekken Chinmi) is a Japanese manga series written by Takeshi Maekawa, and the second series of books in the Ironfist Chinmi saga. It was published by Kodansha in Monthly Shōnen Magazine from 1997 to 2004 and collected in 20 tankōbon volumes.

In the first saga, Chinmi must discover the force that is oppressing the Ka Nan (嘉南) people, and free the people from slavery by defeating their powerful oppressors. In the second saga, Chinmi, Shii Fan, and Tan Tan, was sent by the emperor to investigate a conspiracy within the Chinese Navy.

=== Characters ===
Pu Shin
An eccentric and clumsy former farmer, with swordsmanship has a hobby. He acts as the comic relief in this saga.
Ho Jun
Formerly known as Lee, she only survivor of the previous Ka Nan royal family. She escaped assassination as she was living incognito in town. Vowing revenge, she led the Ka Nan resistance to bring down Jirai's reign.
Bolo
A fisherman that helped Chinmi and Pu Shin enter Ka Nan. He later joins the resistance.
Kiri
Bolo's foster son. His parents were forcibly moved to become slave labor.
Ga Shin and Sho Tan
Former Kourin Temple disciples and members of the resistance.
Jirai
A cruel businessman, who enters the Ka Nan region on the premise of setting up a factory to improve commerce, and ends up usurping the throne and oppressing the people of Ka Nan. Jirai runs a secret metal factory and a cannon factory, that he uses to gain huge profits by selling cannon, cannonball and gunpowder on the black market. Jirai killed every member of the royal family save Princess Ho Jun.
General Boru
Jirai's right hand man and commander-in-chief of the Ka Nan soldiers. He is once a lone warrior that trains by himself. He has mastered the Iron Armor technique that allows him to withstand even powerful attacks or seemingly fatal conditions, and able to break down even walls with his hands. General Boru has a talent that allows him to be able to mimic others' fighting style just by simply watching them use it once.
Soubi
The ruthless and cruel captain of the Ka Nan soldiers. After being humiliated twice by Chinmi, Soubi was relieved of his duties and devoted himself to hunt Chinmi down. He is a highly skilled swordsman and warrior. He has a 'Secret weapon', a smooth but tough wire with iron balls on its end, hidden in his left hand.

=== Ka Nan Saga ===
The Dairin Temple monks lose contact with Kourin Temple in the autonomous Ka Nan region of South China. They send Chinmi to investigate. During the journey, Chinmi meets Pu Shin, an eccentric, clumsy and wannabe swordsman. They arrive at the border of Ka Nan, but are refused entry into the region. Suspecting that Chinmi will try to sneak back into Ka Nan, the border guards attempt to kill them. Chinmi and Pu Shin barely escapes a group of border guards and the Ka Nan commander, General Boru, and falls into the river. They are rescued by fishermen Bolo and Kiri, and learn that two years ago, cruel businessman Jirai usurped the throne and killed the royal family. They smuggled Chinmi and Pu Shin into the region, but were later arrested for being an accessory.

Chinmi and Pu Shin arrive at Kourin Temple to find it sealed, ruined, and deserted. More soldiers came, and Chinmi swiftly dispatches them. Two Kourin Temple disciples, Ga-Shin and Sho-Tan, appears and explains the situation. After Jirai became leader, a grassroots movement of discontent towards the authorities started at the temple. Fearing rebellion, Jirai ordered the temple closed, banned freedom of assembly, weapons, or martial arts in Ka Nan. Refusing to submit to tyranny, Kourin Temple made a stand against the Ka Nan military.. only to be utterly defeated and their head monk killed.

A rebel scout reported seeing Bolo and Kiri in chains. Chinmi quickly head off to the rescue, and defeated a squad of soldiers alone by knocking them off a bridge with his Tsuuhaiken. Intrigued, Soubi, the cruel captain of the guards, vows to hunt down Chinmi. He orders his soldiers to arrest every men and boys around Kourin Temple in order to goad Chinmi out of hiding. Ga Shin and Sho Tan was arrested, but Chinmi, Pu Shin, Bolo and Kiri managed to evade capture and regroup.

Chinmi joined a rebellion led by Ho Jun, the former princess and sole survivor of the previous royal family. They discovered that Jirai runs a secret cannon factory using the Ka Nan people as slave labor. They plan to capture Jirai on the day of the cannon transportation where security is low. As they infiltrate the palace, Soubi appears and duels Chinmi alone, while Ho Jun and the others fight their way into Jirai's suite. After a grueling fight, Chinmi manages to knock out Soubi. The others surround Jirai in his private suite but he managed to escape. They continue to pursue the tyrant, but Soubi once again confronts Chinmi, and this time Chinmi defeats Soubi who falls to his death.

Meanwhile, another rebel group opens various gates to let the main body of citizens into the cannon factory. Several hundred citizens storm the factory with primitive weapons, but they are halted by cannon-fire from Boru. After a brief standoff, the riot resumes after Boru leaves for the palace and a group of prisoners led by Sho-Tan make a surprise attack using gunpowder barrels. Without Boru, the guards were overwhelmed and the resistance group managed to commandeer the cannons. The guards surrenders and the rebels free all the slaves.

Chinmi, Ho Jun and a few more rebels corner Jirai, but Boru appears on the scene. Chinmi faces Boru alone so Ho Jun can capture Jirai. Boru is shown to be incredibly skilled and powerful. His signature Iron Armor Technique allows him to destroy even brick walls with his bare hands, and he has the ability to master a new technique through just one observation. Ho Jun managed to capture Jirai and uses him as a hostage, but Boru saves him. Jirai then escapes through a secret tunnel that leads to a river with Ho Jun in pursuit, while Chinmi reengaged Boru. Once again Chinmi slowly got overwhelmed by Boru, who is able to endure several Tsuuhaiken strikes, and was even able learn and use it against Chinmi. Ho Jun pursues Jirai and discovers that he is planning to flee Ka Nan with its gold reserves. Ho Jun fights Jirai, but he managed to escape through the river with a boat. However, he is intercepted by the fishermen's fleet led by Bolo. Cornered, Jirai is forced to surrender.

Meanwhile, a desperate Chinmi resorted to the Thunder God Fist. Despite his best efforts to hide it, Boru saw through him and utilised the technique. Chinmi fails to execute the attack because of his injuries. After another gruelling battle, he managed to knock Boru off the castle walls. Boru survives the fall. But, ashamed to be defeated by a weaker warrior, takes his own life in front of Ho Jun and her men. The liberation plan is a success. Jirai is sent to the national capital to face trial. Ho Jun was elected as the new leader of Ka Nan. Ryukai arrives in Ka Nan to help reestablish Kourin Temple. After a long rehabilitation, Chinmi returns home to Dairin Temple with Ryukai as Ho Jun and the grateful Ka Nan citizenry bids farewell.

=== Characters ===
Zuiun
The current admiral of the navy, who is sick. Admiral Zuiun is the adviser and once the military mentor of the emperor.
Chao Liu
One of the two adjutants in the Navy. Chao Liu was recommended by Zui Un to be the next Admiral. He went away for an expedition in the beginning of the saga.
Kaion
One of the two adjutants in the Navy. Kaion has a strong rivalry with Chao Liu. Envious that Chao Liu was selected to be the next Admiral, he staged a mutiny to obtain the Admiral position by force.
Geibi
Formerly the commander of the Elite Marines, Geibi is Kaion's right hand man. Known as 'The Orca', Geibi is a big man who is feared by the pirates.
The Elite Marines
50 soldiers who are experts in hand-to-hand combat. They are the most feared Naval unit by pirates. Their current commander is Tsuen.

=== Navy Saga ===
After the Emperor heard of Chinmi's involvement in Ka Nan, he asked General Ourin to dispatch Chinmi, along with Tan Tan and Shii Fan, to infiltrate the Navy. The emperor has suspected that there were men with ulterior motives to overthrow Admiral Zuiun, his closest military advisor, in order to gain authority in the navy.

After meeting up, the trio enlisted in the Navy. After displaying great combat skills during the recruitment, the trio aroused the senior officers' suspicions. Tan Tan was arrested and tortured in a rising sea tide cell. He survived and was rescued by Shii Fan. Meanwhile, Chinmi sneaks into Admiral Zuiun's room and delivers the emperor's message, gaining his trust.

It is revealed that Kaion, one of the Admiral's adjutants, and his lieutenant Geibi, plans to kill Chao Liu, the admiral's other adjutant and successor to the admiralty. Chao Liu is returning with his fleet from a mission. Kaion and Geibi mobilizes the new recruits, including Shii Fan and Tan Tan who hides among the ranks, to engage Chao Liu's fleet claiming that it has been hijacked by pirates. The plan is for Kaion's fleet to destroy Chao Liu's in a staged ambush as it passes a bottleneck of reefs, and the new recruits will be killed in the cross fire to eliminate any witnesses. The Admiral discovered the rouse, and was locked up by the mutineers.

Chinmi was discovered eavesdropping as the plan was discussed, and got knocked overboard the flagship during a struggle against Kaion. Against all odds, including an encounter with a shark, Chinmi managed to get to shore and trek back to the flagship just in time as the Kaion's and Chao Liu's fleets engage. Using Goku's help, Chinmi managed to send a signal to Chao Liu, alerting him of the mutiny. Meanwhile, Shii Fan and Tan Tan managed to commandeer a support ship and boards the flagship's artillery compartment. Chinmi attempted to disable the flagship's helm to slow down Kaion's plan, but was caught by Geibi.

Shii Fan and Tan Tan fought their way to the flagship's deck and rescued Chinmi. Just then, Chao Liu, having learned about Kaion's plan, boards the flagship and battles Kaion's crew. However, Kaion manages to escape in the commotion to another ship and Geibi lit the gunpowder magazine before jumping overboard. Shii Fan, Tan Tan, and Chinmi barely manage to jump overboard with the Admiral as the deck of the flagship is destroyed by an explosion. Chao Liu's and his crew survives the explosion below deck, in the artillery compartment.

Kaion then dispatches the Navy's Elite Marines to finish off the survivors. Chao Liu and his lieutenant, Han Zhou, goes after Kaion while Chinmi, Shii Fan, and Tan Tan battles the marines on the crippled flagship. Armed with their signature chakram weapons, the marines fare well against the trio. Chinmi, Shii Fan and Tan Tan managed to defeat most of them until their commander, Tsuen appears. Tsuen proves to be an exceptional soldier and leader, pushing the trio to their limits and badly injuring them. With the combination of Tan Tan's Windmill throw, Shii Fan's Spinning Staff, and Chinmi's Tsuuhaiken, Tsuen was finally defeated.

Meanwhile, Kaion reboards the flagship and engages in a fight with Chao Liu and Han Zhou. After a gruelling one on one battle, Chao Liu ultimately gains the upper hand but lost his voice. Han Zhou then signals their crew to finish off Kaion's remaining command ship. The broadside from their command ship immobilizes Kaion's, but the flagship got caught in the cross fire. As the flagship started to sink, the ship's main mast hits Kaion from the back, killing him, and his body fell to the sea. The elite marines abandoned ship, while Chinmi, Shii Fan, and Tan Tan barely reached the stern of the sinking flagship to reunite with Chao Liu as his crew arrives.

In the aftermath, Admiral Zuiun appoints Chao Liu as his successor. After recuperating, Chinmi, Shii Fan, and Tan Tan departs to the capital to report to the emperor.

== Ironfist Chinmi Legends ==
Ironfist Chinmi Legends (Tekken Chinmi Legends) is a Japanese manga series written by Takeshi Maekawa, and the third series of books in the Ironfist Chinmi saga. It was published by Kodansha in Monthly Shōnen Magazine from 2006 and is a currently ongoing series, consisting of at least 28 tankōbon volumes. It was published by Elex Media Komputindo in Indonesia.

In the first saga, Chinmi must rescue Princess Mito of a neighbouring kingdom from bandits. In the second saga, Chinmi helps save his love interest Yan from a flash flood that hits the nearby town.

=== Characters ===
Princess Mito
Princess of an unnamed kingdom, she transforms from spoiled royal to responsible leader through the events of the 1st saga. She runs away during a trip to visit the Chinese Emperor, wanting to be "free as a bird". She gets kidnapped by bandits and is taken to Zeigan's castle after townspeople refuse to handle such a high-profile captive. Approximately the same age as Chinmi, they both face difficult situations that help transform them positively. After being rescued by Chinmi, the princess is very thankful to Chinmi, and publicly takes responsibility for the entire incident.
Commander Pegu
Head of Princess Mito's Royal Guards and a strong and capable warrior. He joins forces with Chinmi to help rescue the princess.
Durato
Captain of Princess Mito's Royal Guards, and a highly skilled swordsman. Durato initially mistakes Chinmi for an enemy after Chinmi steals an army horse to chase after the kidnapped princess. He joins forces with Chinmi to help rescue the princess. By the end, Durato is very thankful to Chinmi and considers him his teacher, even in absence.
Zeigan
Leader of the bandit town, Zeigan is wise, cunning, feared, and has a formidable reputation. His wife died, and his only daughter ran away years ago, while making it appear like she was killed at sea. Due to this, Zeigan drinks too much, to the dismay of his mistress and cook who care for his health. His daughter returns at the end of the saga with her new-born child.
Ten Warriors
Ten formidable warriors who work as Zeigan's elite fighting unit. They include a monkey trainer, a Tsuuhaiken user (like Chinmi), and various other formidable fighters. Chinmi single handedly defeats 6 of the 10, and then defeats the leader Gantei at the final showdown.
Gantei
The powerful leader of the Ten Fighters, he is known as the "Red Eyed Swordsman" since his eyes turn blood-red when enraged. He is considered to be evenly matched with Chinmi. He uses a unique dual-bladed sword, that can be merged at the tip to form a single sword. He techniques includes "Falcon", "Flapping Wings", "Falcon Bite" among others. Finally defeated by Chinmi using his own sword.

=== Princess Mito Saga ===
Princess Mito was kidnapped by bandits of the Mualong region after she disobeys protocol and goes for a midnight walk alone. She runs away partially due to fear of attending a ceremony with the Chinese emperor, for which she is chosen as representative of her kingdom.

After a lengthy chase, Chinmi and his apprentice Gunte finds the princess taken captive by bandit warlord Zeigan of the Mualong region, and held prisoner in his castle. Luckily Zeigan treats the princess well and does not harm or mistreat her (it is later revealed that he had a daughter of her age who disappeared). After defeating various guards and thugs, Chinmi locates the princess and sets out to infiltrate the impregnable castle. Chinmi is joined by the princess's Royal Guards, Commander Pegu and Captain Durato of the same. Chinmi defeats various members of the warlord's elite forces, a team of ten, including a monkey-tamer like himself, and evolves his Tsuuhaiken technique to defeat another formidable opponent also trained in the same technique.

Gunte and the accompanying team also manage to defeat various opponents. The team intercepts the princess but she is taken captive again by a pair of two men, dubbed the "Pendulum Spider", due to their swinging technique. The princess realizes how many people have risked their lives to protect hers. After they recapture the princess, they are stopped by the powerful leader of the ten, the "Red Eyed Swordsman", Gantei.

The entire team of rescuers are captured by Gantei and his men, and brought before Zeigan. Zeigan organizes a final duel between champions Chinmi and Gantei, and if Chinmi wins, the princess will be set free. Gantei ferociously attacks Chinmi using his Black Wing technique, that involves attacks carried out during somersaults using two detachable swords. Exhausted with the previous battles, Chinmi is forced to fight "With All Of One's Strength" (Ch. 35) to defeat Gantei in a climatic last battle. Completely exhausted, Chinmi collapses on the battlefield shortly after defeating Gantei.

Zeigan reveals the final battle between Chinmi and Gantei is staged as such that he would benefit regardless of who won. If Gantei won, Zeigan would keep the princess captive and bargain with her kingdom for her release. And if Chinmi won, Gantei, the leader of an illegal narcotics trade operation running without Zeigan's permission, would be defeated, cleaning up his region.

Princess Mito is released by Zeigan with the words "This might be a lawless land, but we keep our word". He further states "The line between good and evil are not so easy to define; A man who steals to avoid starvation; And a man who kills to save his own life; There are many who have lived a privileged life and have never seen the real world". He leaves her with the advice "Always keep your eyes and heart close to the ground." Princess Mito is very thankful to everyone who rescued her, especially Chinmi, as she fell unconscious during the final battle. They leave Zeigan's castle and upon reaching their caravan, the princess publicly takes responsibility for the incident. Zeigan's daughter also returns after 4 years, with her newborn child, asking Zeigan to name him/her. The princess decides to continue to journey towards the capital of China, to meet with the Chinese Emperor despite losing the gifts they carried for him. Overjoyed with his daughter's return, Zeigan returns the stolen gifts and promises the princess protection while within his lands.

In a quiet moment, Princess Mito visits Chinmi in his room and personally invites him and his disciple Gunte to her kingdom, calling Chinmi their "Saviour". She kisses Chinmi on the cheek saying "This is the last time we'll be able to meet in private". She leaves quickly, saying she will never forget him. After recovering, Chinmi leaves the procession as the entire army salutes Chinmi and Gunte.

=== Flood Saga ===
The Chinese Emperor personally nominates Chinmi for the country's Outstanding Contribution Award, citing his various significant victories during the past years. Despite his initial hesitation, Chinmi humbly accepts the award with encouragement from the head monk. Army General Ourin and a group of soldiers arrive at Dairin Temple to present Chinmi with the award. Being smitten with Chinmi in the previous story, the General's young daughter Renka covertly follows her father to Dairin Temple. After the ceremony, the army continues on their mission. Unable to take her with him, the General requests Chinmi to find boarding for his daughter at the village. Chinmi requests Yan to house Renka for the week, which she accepts.

Torrential rain prevents movement within the town, and the local village chief notices that the river is draining instead of swelling. He suspects a rockslide has blocked the flow of the river, and it could break at any moment with rushing flood water. The village and Dairin Temple is alerted, and Ryukai and various others arrive to help the villagers evacuate. Filled to the brim, the artificial dam collapses, swelling the river immensely and flooding many crop fields. Yan runs to help the chief's family escape the incoming flood. While rescuing his newborn twins from the riverbank, Yan gets caught by the river's strong current and falls unconscious. With no other option, Chinmi jumps in to save her.

Ryukai and Chinmi's students build a rope to save them. Chinmi grabs the rope, but the bamboo upon which it was tied breaks. Chinmi plunges deep into the river waters with Yan and miraculously find themselves in a boat stuck on the riverbed, which they use to rise to the surface. They crash somewhat safely into a river bridge. Chinmi's students tie Jin Tan to a rope, and he jumps below the bridge to save Chinmi and Yan, barely escaping as the bridge collapses. The townspeople are relieved that nobody was hurt, and Chinmi comforts Yan as she breaks down into tears.

Witnessing the event and the prompt action of Dairin Temple students and instructors, Renka writes her accounts of the event, entitled "Chinmi's Heroic Tale".

== Manga ==
=== Japanese Series ===
- Tekken Chinmi
- Shin Tekken Chinmi
- Tekken Chinmi Gaiden
- Tekken Chinmi Legends

=== English Series ===
Bloomsbury UK Publishing

- Ironfist Chinmi
  - Volume 01: Kung Fu Boy
  - Volume 02: Journey to Mount Shen
  - Volume 03: Victory for the Spirit
  - Volume 04: Leap of Faith
  - Volume 05: Attack of the Black Flame
  - Volume 06: Blind Fury
  - Volume 07: Pole Stars
  - Volume 08: Drunken Master
  - Volume 09: Breaking Glass
  - Volume 10: Boxing Clever
  - Volume 11: Whirlwind Fist
  - Volume 12: Cutting Edge

== Anime ==
The first series of Ironfist Chinmi was developed into an animated series by Ashi Productions with the assistance of the author Takeshi Maekawa. It consisted of 20 episodes and was broadcast from July 1988 to December 1988 on TV Asahi.

Credits

- Author: Takeshi Maekawa
- Planning: Yoshiaki Koizumi (TV Asahi), Masamichi Fujiwara (Toho Co., Ltd.)
- Script Writer: Junki Takegami
- Director: Hisataro Oba
- Character Design: Kenichi Onuki
- Chief Animation Director: Kenichi Onuki
- Art Director: Katsuyoshi Kanemura
- Sound Director: Fusanobu Fujiyama
- Director of Photography: Takeshi Fukuda
- Editors: Toshio Henmi, Kazuhiko Seki
- Music Coordinator: Kei Wakakusa
- Producer: Masayoshi Kawada (TV Asahi), Yasushi Yoritsune (Toho Co., Ltd.), Hiroshi Kato
- Production: TV Asahi, Toho Co., Ashi Productions

Cast

- Chinmi: Chika Sakamoto
- Kintan: Shigeru Nakahara
- Raochu: Yu Mizushima
- Raichi: Toshie Sakaue
- Meirin: Yuko Sasaki
- Rayu: Masato Kubota
- Shifan: Asami Mukaidono
- Roshi Ro: Hiroshi Masuoka
- Narration: Tadashi Nakamura

== See also ==
- Break Shot
