= Break Shot =

Japanese manga series

- First tankōbon volume cover, featuring Shinsuke Oda

ブレイクショット (Bureiku Shotto)
- Genre: Sports
- Manga
- Written by: Takeshi Maekawa
- Published by: Kodansha
- Magazine: Weekly Shōnen Magazine
- Original run: June 17, 1987 – June 27, 1990
- Volumes: 16
- icon

Break Shot (Japanese: ブレイクショット, Hepburn: Bureiku Shotto) is a Japanese manga series written and illustrated by Takeshi Maekawa. It was serialized in Kodansha's shōnen manga magazine Weekly Shōnen Magazine from 1987 to 1990, with its chapters collected in sixteen tankōbon volumes.

== Plot ==
Shinsuke Oda, the sole member of his high school's billiards club, is a gifted player specializing in jump shots. He competes to save his club from disbandment and impress student council president Asako Hayakawa. After securing official recognition for the club, he faces stronger opponents like elite player Ryoji Kano, progressing from school tournaments to professional competitions while honing his skills.

== Characters ==
Shinsuke Oda (織田 信介, Oda Shinsuke)
Shinsuke is a high school student deeply passionate about pool and the sole member of his school's pool club. Highly focused and naturally skilled, he demonstrates exceptional talent during matches, often devising inventive techniques to overcome challenging situations. His signature move is the jump shot, though he later incorporates a wider range of unconventional and advanced techniques into his playstyle.
Asako Hayakawa (早川 麻子, Hayakawa Asako)
Asako is the student body president at Shinsuke's high school. Initially tasked with disbanding the underfunded and understaffed pool club, she changes her mind after witnessing Shinsuke's exceptional skill. Impressed, she not only allows the club to remain active but also joins as a member.
Ryoji Kano (加納 涼二, Kanō Ryōji)
Ryoji is one of Japan's top billiards players, renowned as "Three Moves Ryoji" for consistently defeating opponents in just three moves. Though naturally left-handed, he plays with equal skill using his right hand. His signature technique, the "shotgun shot", involves striking the cue ball with such force that it shatters upon impact, using the fragments to strike surrounding balls.
Minoru Aono (青野 実, Aono Minoru)
Minoru is another of Shinsuke's associates, who specializes in precise backspin shots that return the cue ball to the table's center. This technique consistently positions him for optimal follow-up shots.
Tsuyoshi Ogaki (大垣 強, Ōgaki Tsuyoshi)
Tsuyoshi is another associate Shinsuke met during his first tournament. He specializes in an overpowered massé shot that creates dramatic chain reactions. While the technique generates impressive angled caroms, its raw power comes at the cost of precision compared to professional standards.
Jeffery Boid (ジェフリー・ボイド, Jefurī Boido)
Jeffery is the primary rival in the Japan-U.S. high school tournament held in Hawaii. His playing style features advanced techniques that manipulate spin and air currents to execute seemingly impossible shots. The speed and precision of his approach challenge conventional pool strategies.

== Publication ==
Written and illustrated by Takeshi Maekawa, Break Shot was serialized in Kodansha's shōnen manga magazine Weekly Shōnen Magazine from June 17, 1987, to June 27, 1990. Kodansha collected its chapters in sixteen tankōbon volumes, released from November 13, 1987, to August 11, 1990.

== Reception ==
Carlo Santos of Anime News Network praised Break Shot for its dynamic visuals and exhilarating trick shots, which elevate billiards into an action-packed spectacle. However, he criticized its weak character development, underutilized supporting cast, and excessive focus on technical gameplay at the expense of storytelling depth. While entertaining, he concluded that the series falls short of being a standout sports manga.

== See also ==
- Ironfist Chinmi, another manga series by the same author
