= Fire Ball! (manga) =

Japanese manga series

- First tankōbon volume cover
- Genre: Sports
- Manga
- Written by: Yukinobu Tatsu
- Published by: Kodansha
- Magazine: Monthly Shōnen Magazine
- Original run: February 6, 2013 – August 6, 2014
- Volumes: 5
- icon

Fire Ball! (stylized in all caps) is a Japanese manga series by Yukinobu Tatsu. It is a high school baseball manga featuring Kyuji Katagiri, a strong pitcher obsessed with being number one, as the main character. The story depicts Kyuji's rise to prominence using his fastball, thrown with an unorthodox delivery, as his main weapon. It was serialized in Kodansha's Monthly Shōnen Magazine from March 2013 to September 2014, with its chapters collected in five tankōbon volumes.

== Plot ==
In the fall of his third year of junior high, Kyuji Katagiri, who had decided to attend Seimine Academy, a prestigious baseball school, has a fateful encounter in a casual baseball game with Taro Tanaka, a genius cleanup hitter who led his senior league team to a national championship. After being defeated by Tanaka, a peer and formidable rival, Kyuji sets his sights on defeating him in high school baseball. To do so, he deliberately avoids Seimine Academy, where Tanaka is going, and instead enrolls at the public school Haneoka High.

== Characters ==
Kyuji Katagiri (片桐 球児, Katagiri Kyūji)
A first-year pitcher at Haneoka High School who uses his signature pitch, the "Fireball"—an ultra-downward, high-speed fastball thrown from a unique delivery. He is a passionate, slightly airheaded baseball fanatic who is obsessed with being number one.
Taro Tanaka (田中 太郎, Tanaka Tarō)
A fellow first-year student and genius home run hitter with exceptional batting sense. He attends Seimine Academy and plays as a catcher.
Subaru Hoshikawa (星川 昴, Hoshikawa Subaru)
A first-year student at Haneoka High and the baseball team's manager. She is Kyuji's childhood friend.
Yusuke Baba (馬場 裕介, Baba Yūsuke)
A first-year catcher at Haneoka High. His only real boast is having played in the senior league. His nickname is "Big Mama".
Kazuma Matsui (松井 カズマ, Matsui Kazuma)
A second-year student at Haneoka High. He bats cleanup and possesses rare batting sense and power. Position: third baseman.
Daisuke Sawamura (沢村 大輔, Sawamura Daisuke)
A second-year student at Haneoka High. Captain of the baseball team and a self-proclaimed baseball analysis nerd. Known for his flexible wrists and consistent hitting. Position: shortstop.

== Publication ==
Written and illustrated by Yukinobu Tatsu, Fire Ball! was serialized in Kodansha's Monthly Shōnen Magazine from February 6, 2013, to August 6, 2014. Kodansha collected its chapters in five tankōbon volumes, released from May 17, 2013, to September 17, 2014.

Shueisha started releasing a new edition of the five volumes on March 4, 2025.

=== Volumes ===
No.	Release date	ISBN
1	May 17, 2013	978-4-06-371381-7
2	September 17, 2013	978-4-06-371389-3
3	December 17, 2013	978-4-06-371403-6
4	May 16, 2014	978-4-06-371419-7
5	September 17, 2014	978-4-06-371436-4
