= Dear Boys =

Japanese manga series and its adaptations

- First tankōbon volume cover
- Genre: Sports
- Manga
- Written by: Hiroki Yagami
- Published by: Kodansha
- Magazine: Monthly Shōnen Magazine
- Original run: June 1989 – present
- Volumes: 99
- Series titles
- 1. Dear Boys (1989–1997, 23 volumes); 2. Dear Boys The Early Days (1997, 1 volume); 3. Dear Boys Act II (1997–2008, 30 volumes); 4. Dear Boys Act 3 (2008–2015, 21 volumes); 5. Dear Boys Over Time (2016–2017, 3 volumes); 6. Dear Boys Act 4 (2018–present, 21 volumes)
- Video game
- Publisher: Yutaka
- Genre: Sports
- Platform: Super Famicom
- Released: 20 October 1994
- Anime television series

Hoop Days
- Directed by: Susumu Kudo
- Written by: Nobuaki Kishima
- Music by: Nittoku Inoue
- Studio: A.C.G.T
- Licensed by: NA: Bandai Entertainment; SEA: Medialink
- Original network: TV Tokyo
- English network: SEA: Animax Asia
- Original run: 8 April 2003 – 29 September 2003
- Episodes: 26
- Video game

Dear Boys: Fast Break!
- Developer: Konami
- Genre: Sports
- Platform: PlayStation 2
- Released: 18 September 2003
- icon

Dear Boys (stylized in all caps) is a Japanese sports manga series written and illustrated by Hiroki Yagami. It was serialized in Kodansha's shōnen manga magazine Monthly Shōnen Magazine from June 1989 to January 1997, with its chapters collected in 23 tankōbon volumes. The story concerns the progress of the Mizuho High School basketball team as it attempts to win the prefectural championship. It also deals with the relationship between the players on the team, especially the two main characters Kazuhiko Aikawa and Takumi Fujiwara.

Dear Boys has spawned other manga series, also published in Monthly Shōnen Magazine: Dear Boys The Early Days (1997); Dear Boys Act II (1997–2008); Dear Boys Act 3 (2008–2015); Dear Boys Over Time (2016–2017); and Dear Boys Act 4 (2018–present).

A 26-episode anime television series adaptation of the original series, produced by OB Planning and animated by A.C.G.T, was broadcast on TV Tokyo from April to September 2003. In North America, the series was licensed by Bandai Entertainment and released under the title Hoop Days.

By March 2019, the overall Dear Boys manga series has sold over 45 million copies, making it one of the best-selling manga series of all time. In 2007, Dear Boys Act II won the 31st Kodansha Manga Award in the shōnen category.

== Plot ==
The Mizuho High School basketball team faces dissolution due to insufficient players after their coach departs following an altercation with Fujiwara. The team's fortunes change when Kazuhiko Aikawa transfers to the school, inspiring the remaining members through his passion for basketball. With only five players and no substitutes, they convince the girls' team coach to take on their training. Initially stern in her methods, the coach gradually develops a strong bond with the team. Through determined effort, the players work to overcome their numerical disadvantage and compete at the prefectural level.

== Characters ==
Kazuhiko Aikawa (哀川 和彦, Aikawa Kazuhiko)
Voiced by: Kōhei Kiyasu (Japanese); Mark Gatha (English)
Aikawa reignites his teammates' love for basketball, with Mutsumi observing how he reminds them of the fun they once shared. Formerly the captain and pivotal player of Tendōji High's basketball team, he plays as a small forward. Though shorter than most, his remarkable leaping ability allows him to dunk. His talent grows with each game, marking him as a naturally skilled player. He is close friends with Masato Sawanobori, Tendōji's star point guard, and Fujiwara Takumi, the Mizuho team's captain. A source of encouragement during difficult games, he is also romantically involved with Mai Moritaka of the girls' team.
Takumi Fujiwara (藤原 拓弥, Fujiwara Takumi)
Voiced by: Masaya Matsukaze (Japanese); Ethan Cole (English)
Fujiwara, nicknamed "Taku" by friends, is a second-year Mizuho High student and captain of its basketball team, playing as point guard. He maintains a romantic relationship with Mutsumi Akiyoshi from the girls' team and a close friendship with Miura Ranmaru, his teammate since junior high. During his first year, an altercation led to him punching a coach, resulting in the coach's transfer and a one-year tournament ban for the team. An old knee injury from a game with Miura requires rehabilitation to improve flexibility for the prefectural tournament. Aikawa credits Fujiwara as his motivation to exceed limits, though denies Fujiwara equals Masato Sawanobori's skill.
Ranmaru Miura (三浦 蘭丸, Miura Ranmaru)
Voiced by: Ken Takeuchi (Japanese); Scott Roberts (English)
Miura, Fujiwara's longtime friend since middle school, maintains a calm and quiet demeanor. As Mizuho's shooting guard, he specializes in three-point shots and excels at stealing the ball, preferring scoring over playmaking. His signature move includes fadeaway three-pointers. During a match against Kadena Nishi, he attempts NBA-range three-pointers to secure victory but sustains an injury from Kenta Shimabukuro's foul, forcing him to miss the next game. Though he blames himself for Fujiwara's knee injury, the incident wasn't his fault. Keiko Ogami from the girls' team shows romantic interest in him. Fujiwara hopes Miura will regain his former unpredictable playstyle with precise passes and sharp shooting before the tournament begins.
Tsutomu Ishii (石井 努, Ishii Tsutomu)
Voiced by: Tatsuhisa Suzuki (Japanese); Brendan Hunter (English)
Ishii plays as power forward for the team, known for his explosive temper that often leads to fouls when provoked by opponents. Early matches show him frequently committing crucial fouls, but his skills and composure steadily improve as the team advances. He shares a close friendship with Dobashi, having been teammates since middle school at Takakura Junior High. His physical playing style earns him comparisons to a "big machine" due to his powerful presence on court.
Kenji Dobashi (土橋 健二, Dobashi Kenji)
Voiced by: Katsuyuki Konishi (Japanese); Lucas Gilbertson (English)
Dobashi serves as the team's center and its largest player. Despite his quiet demeanor and physical resemblance to Miura, he overcomes weaker leg strength to become an exceptional defender, rebounder, and ball thief. Ishii nicknames him "old man" due to his appearance, though he later changes his hairstyle before the prefectural championship. A Takakura Junior High alumnus, Dobashi grows into one of the team's defensive pillars—his absence due to injury noticeably weakens their performance as teammates rely heavily on his defensive presence.
Tōya Takashina (高階 トウヤ, Takashina Tōya)
Takashina first appears practicing alone before joining as the team's sixth member. A versatile player capable of any position, he demonstrates exceptional three-point shooting comparable to Miura's skill and strong rebounding ability. He previously attended middle school with Ayumi Fuse.
Mutsumi Akiyoshi (秋吉 夢津美, Akiyoshi Mutsumi)
Voiced by: Miki Yoshino (Japanese); Carol-Anne Day (English)
Mutsumi Akiyoshi captains the girls' basketball team and plays as point guard. A close friend of Moritaka, she is romantically involved with Takumi Fujiwara, whose talent she once admired. During the quarter-finals, emotional distress led to multiple fouls and her benching. However, after a heartfelt conversation with Fujiwara before the finals, she returns to peak performance, helping secure Mizuho's victory.
Mai Moritaka (森高 麻衣, Moritaka Mai)
Voiced by: Akiko Kawase (Japanese); Leda Davies (English)
Mai Moritaka enters a romantic relationship with Kazuhiko Aikawa, who nicknames her "Pony" due to her distinctive ponytail. Though her official position remains unspecified, she develops into the team's most accurate three-point shooter after receiving personal training from Aikawa.
Keiko Ōgami (大神 恵子, Ōgami Keiko)
Voiced by: Miho Yamada (Japanese); Cheryl McMaster (English)
Keiko serves as center for the girls' team, standing as their tallest player. She demonstrates romantic interest in Miura, notably giving him a victory sign and prompting Mutsumi to remark about potential jealousy when other girls congratulate him.
Masato Sawanobori (サワンボリ マサト, Sawanobori Masato)
Voiced by: Hirofumi Nojima (Japanese); Victor Atelevich (English)
Kazuhiko's best friend and another member of the boys' basketball team at Mizuho High school.
Satomi Anzaki (杏崎 沙斗未, Anazaki Satomi)
Voiced by: Mamiko Noto
The Mizuho team manager attended junior high with Fujiwara and Miura, being one year their junior. Once a star basketball player, a career-ending injury left her withdrawn and bitter, earning a reputation for harshness among players. She gradually softens over time, becoming a dedicated supporter of the team.
Kyoko Himuro (氷室 京子, Himuro Kyoko)
Voiced by: Atsuko Tanaka
Kyoko serves as both homeroom teacher and coach for Mizuho's girls' basketball team. She intervenes to prevent the boys' team's disbandment, arranging Kazuhiko Aikawa's transfer from Tendōji through her connection with his older sister, a former teammate. Though strict in her methods, she demonstrates genuine care for her players while pushing them to develop their potential.

== Media ==
=== Manga ===
Written and illustrated by Hiroki Yagami, Dear Boys was serialized in Kodansha's shōnen manga magazine Monthly Shōnen Magazine from June 1989 to January 1997. Kodansha collected its chapters in 23 tankōbon volumes, released from 16 December 1989 to 17 March 1997. Other related series and sequels, published in the same magazine, have been released:

- Dear Boys The Early Days

Serialized from February to May 1997; its chapters were collected in a single tankōbon volume, released on 12 August of that same year.

- Dear Boys Act II

Serialized from July 1997 to November 2008. Its chapters were collected in 30 tankōbon volumes, released from 17 November 1997 to 17 February 2009.

- Dear Boys Act 3

Serialized from 6 December 2008 to 4 December 2015. Its chapters were collected in 21 tankōbon volumes, released from 17 June 2009 to 17 February 2016.

- Dear Boys Over Time

Serialized from 5 February 2016 to 6 January 2017. Its chapters were collected in three tankōbon volume, released from 17 June 2016 to 17 February 2017.

- Dear Boys Act 4

It started on 6 October 2018. The first tankōbon volume was released on 15 March 2019. As of 17 November 2025, 21 volumes have been released. A six-volume prequel to Act 4, titled Dear Boys Shōnan Dai Sagami Special Selection (DEAR BOYS 湘南大相模スペシャルセレクション), set two years before the events of the story, was published digitally on 15 March 2019.

=== Video games ===
A video game, published by Yutaka for the Super Famicom, was released on 20 October 1994. Another video game, titled Dear Boys: Fast Break!, published by Konami for the PlayStation 2, was released on 18 September 2003.

=== Anime ===
A 26-episode anime television series adaptation, produced by OB Planning and animated by A.C.G.T, aired on TV Tokyo from 8 April to 30 September 2003. Da Pump performed the opening theme "Sound of Bounce", while Chris Sasaki (credited as Chris) performed the ending theme "Baller no Shōgō" (Ballerの章号; "Baller's Number").

In North America, the series was licensed by Bandai Entertainment in 2004. They released it under the title Hoop Days; episodes were partially released on two DVD sets on 28 June and 23 August 2005 and a "Complete Collection" was later released on 5 June 2006. The series was licensed in Australia and New Zealand by Madman Entertainment, who released a Complete Collection set on 6 September 2006. Medialink licensed the series in Southeast Asia and was broadcast on Animax Asia.

==== Episodes ====
No.	Title	Original release date
1	"An Interesting Transfer Student"; Transliteration: "Ki ni Naru Tenkousei" (Japanese: 気になる転校生)	8 April 2003
Kazuhiko Aikawa has recently transferred to Mizuho High School. When asking a teacher why there was no boys' basketball team he was told that they were not a functioning team and that they were about to be disbanded. Aikawa then declared that he was to be the fifth member of the team so that they could attempt the championship.
2	"The Resurrection of the Boys' Basketball Team?"; Transliteration: "Danshi Baskebu Fukkatsusu?" (Japanese: 男子バスケ部復活す?)	15 April 2003
3	"Who Is the Opponent for the Practice Team?"; Transliteration: "Renshū Shiai no Aite wa?" (Japanese: 練習試合の相手は?)	22 April 2003
The episode starts with a flashback showing how the star ace from Tendōji High's basketball team wound up at Mizuho. Basketball practice starts and once again the boys, barring Aikawa, do not show up. However the episode shows them all gathering things for basketball or practicing. The final day for the ban has come and Aikawa shows up to the gym to practice a little only to find Miura, Ishii, and Dobashi already there. When Aikawa comments on Fujiwara not being there, he is told that it is not a problem, that he will show up. The next day all five members of the boys' basketball team show up at practice. They play a brief game against the girls only to fail horribly showing that they don't play well together. In order to give them a little initiative coach Akiyoshi pits them against Narita high school in a practice match. The very same team whose coach is Shimojou, the previous captain of the boys' team.
4	"Determination to Win"; Transliteration: "Makerarenai Iji" (Japanese: 負けられない意地)	29 April 2003
5	"Counterattack Full of Wounds"; Transliteration: "Kizu Darake no Hangeki" (Japanese: 傷だらけの反撃)	6 May 2003
6	"To Each His Own Emotion..."; Transliteration: "Sorezore no Omoi..." (Japanese: それぞれの思い...)	13 May 2003
7	"A Disquieting Air"; Transliteration: "Fuon na Kūki" (Japanese: 不穏な空気)	20 May 2003
8	"Cold Rain"; Transliteration: "Tsumetai Ame" (Japanese: 冷たい雨)	27 May 2003
9	"Because You Are Here..."; Transliteration: "Anata ga Iru kara..." (Japanese: あなたがいるから...)	3 June 2003
10	"Confined Passion"; Transliteration: "Tozasareta Jōnetsu" (Japanese: 閉ざされた情熱)	10 June 2003
11	"People Following Their Dreams"; Transliteration: "Yume o Tsugu Monotachi" (Japanese: 夢を継ぐ者たち)	17 June 2003
12	"Meetings Are Sudden"; Transliteration: "Deai wa Totsuzen ni" (Japanese: 出会いは突然に)	24 June 2003
13	"Unengaged Gears"; Transliteration: "Kami Awanai Haguruma" (Japanese: 噛みあわない歯車)	1 July 2003
14	"Anxiety and Burden"; Transliteration: "Fuan to Futan" (Japanese: 不安と負担)	8 July 2003
15	"The Rivals"; Transliteration: "Raibarutachi" (Japanese: ライバルたち)	15 July 2003
16	"Dead Heat"; Transliteration: "Deddo Hīto" (Japanese: デッドヒート)	22 July 2003
17	"Never Give Up"; Transliteration: "Nebaa Gibu Appu" (Japanese: ネバー・ギブアップ)	29 July 2003
18	"Game Set!"; Transliteration: "Geemu Setto" (Japanese: ゲームセット)	5 August 2003
19	"The Finals Opponent Is?"; Transliteration: "Kesshou no Aite wa?" (Japanese: 決勝の相手は?)	12 August 2003
20	"Trembling Hearts"; Transliteration: "Yureru Kokoro" (Japanese: 揺れる心)	19 August 2003
21	"Supporting Family"; Transliteration: "Sasaeau Nakamatachi" (Japanese: 支えあう仲間たち)	26 August 2003
22	"The Sixth Man"; Transliteration: "Rokunin me no Otoko" (Japanese: 六人目の男)	2 September 2003
23	"The Finals!"; Transliteration: "Kesshou!" (Japanese: 決勝!)	9 September 2003
24	"Back and Forth"; Transliteration: "Isshin-ittai!" (Japanese: 一進一退)	16 September 2003
25	"It's Settled, and Then..."; Transliteration: "Kecchaku, Soshite" (Japanese: 決着、そして...)	23 September 2003
26	"Look Towards Tomorrow"; Transliteration: "Ashita ni Mukatte" (Japanese: 明日に向かって)	30 September 2003

== Reception ==
By March 2019, the overall Dear Boys manga series had sold over 45 million copies.

In 2007, Dear Boys Act II received 31st Kodansha Manga Award in the shōnen category.
