= C.M.B. (manga) =

Japanese manga series

- Cover of volume 6, also featuring characters from Q.E.D.

C.M.B. 森羅博物館の事件目録 (C.M.B. Shinra Hakubutsukan no Jiken Mokuroku)
- Manga
- Written by: Motohiro Katou
- Published by: Kodansha
- Magazine: Monthly Shōnen Magazine
- Original run: October 2005 – August 6, 2020
- Volumes: 45

C.M.B. Shinra Hakubutsukan no Jiken Mokuroku (Japanese: C.M.B. 森羅博物館の事件目録; lit. 'C.M.B. Shinra Museum's Case Catalog') is a Japanese manga series written and illustrated by Motohiro Katou. It was serialized in Kodansha's Monthly Shōnen Magazine from 2005 to 2020. Kodansha collected its chapters in forty-five tankōbon volumes, released from March 16, 2006, to October 16, 2020.

It is a companion work of the Q.E.D. manga. The story revolves around the detective Shinra as he solves mystery cases related to murder, fraud, etc. along with his classmate Tatsuki. It sometime features characters from Q.E.D. as a crossover special.

== Synopsis ==
Shinra Sakaki who inherited three rings of Wise Magi became acquaintance of Tatsuki Nanase by awkward case. Since then, Sakaki and Nanase get involved several abnormal incidents to solve trouble-making-problems behalf of other people around who requested their assistant, such as Inspector Kujirajaki.

== Characters ==
Shinra Sakaki (榊 森羅, Sakaki Shinra)
A boy with a mysterious past, owner of the "Shinra Museum" and present heir to the three "C", "M" and "B" rings first given out by the British Queen in the 19th century to three wise men chosen to be the protectors of the knowledge of the British Museum. Although he has never been to school, he is very knowledgeable. He is multi-lingual and possesses at least a university-level knowledge of Math, Physics, Chemistry, Geography, History and Biology, but is deficient in social skills. He is the cousin, on his mother's side, of the protagonist of the manga Q.E.D., Sou Touma.
Tatsuki Nanase (七瀬 立樹, Nanase Tatsuki)
Tatsuki is a spirited, tomboyish girl who excels in virtually every sport she attempts. She practices Aikido and often acts as a bodyguard or an aid for Shinra. She is a daughter of a gullible young lady and her lover, who was almost eloped but suddenly told the bride's father, he accepted their marriage. But in exchange, their first child must go to prestigious school he owns.
