= Shana ou Yoshitsune =

Japanese manga series

- First tankōbon volume cover

遮那王義経 (Shana Ō Yoshitsune)
- Genre: Drama; Historical
- Manga
- Written by: Hirofumi Sawada
- Published by: Kodansha
- Imprint: Monthly Shōnen Magazine Comics
- Magazine: Monthly Shōnen Magazine
- Original run: December 1, 2000 – May 2, 2007
- Volumes: 22
- Manga

Shana ou Yoshitsune: Genpei no Kassen
- Written by: Hirofumi Sawada
- Published by: Kodansha
- Imprint: Monthly Shōnen Magazine Comics
- Magazine: Monthly Shōnen Magazine
- Original run: July 6, 2007 – April 6, 2015
- Volumes: 29
- icon

Shana ou Yoshitsune (Japanese: 遮那王義経, Hepburn: Shana Ō Yoshitsune) is a Japanese manga series written and illustrated by Hirofumi Sawada. It has been serialized in Kodansha's shōnen manga magazine Monthly Shōnen Magazine from May 2004 to October 2007, with its chapters collected in 22 tankōbon volumes. A sequel titled Shana ou Yoshitsune: Genpei no Kassen (Note: Japanese: 遮那王義経 源平の合戦, Hepburn: Shana Ō Yoshitsune: Genpei no Kassen; Shana ou Yoshitsune: Genpei War) was serialized in the same magazine from July 2007 to April 2015, with its chapters collected in 29 volumes.

In 2004, Shana ou Yoshitsune won the 28th Kodansha Manga Award in the shōnen category.

== Publishing ==
Written and illustrated by Hirofumi Sawada, Shana ou Yoshitsune started in Kodansha's shōnen manga magazine Monthly Shōnen Magazine on December 1, 2000. The manga finished serialization on May 2, 2007. (Note: It finished in the magazine's June issue of 2007 (cover date June 1), which was released on May 2.) Kodansha collected its chapters in 22 tankōbon volumes, published from March 14, 2001, to August 17, 2007.

A sequel titled Shana ou Yoshitsune: Genpei no Kassen was serialized in the same magazine from July 6, 2007, (Note: It started in the magazine's August issue of 2007 (cover date August 1), which was released on July 6.) to April 6, 2015. (Note: It finished in the magazine's May issue of 2015 (cover date May 1), which was released on April 6.) Kodansha collected its chapters in 29 tankōbon volumes, published from November 16, 2007, to June 17, 2015.

=== Volumes ===
==== Shana ou Yoshitsune ====
No.	Release date	ISBN
1	March 14, 2001	978-4-06-333762-4
2	July 13, 2001	978-4-06-333779-2
3	December 17, 2001	978-4-06-333799-0
4	April 15, 2002	978-4-06-333820-1
5	August 9, 2002	978-4-06-333839-3
6	January 14, 2003	978-4-06-333860-7
7	April 15, 2003	978-4-06-333875-1
8	August 12, 2003	978-4-06-333897-3
9	January 15, 2004	978-4-06-333920-8
10	May 15, 2004	978-4-06-333934-5
11	September 16, 2004	978-4-06-370952-0
12	January 15, 2005	978-4-06-370969-8
13	May 15, 2005	978-4-06-370987-2
14	September 15, 2005	978-4-06-371010-6
15	February 15, 2006	978-4-06-371022-9
16	May 17, 2006	978-4-06-371044-1
17	July 14, 2006	978-4-06-371051-9
18	October 17, 2006	978-4-06-371062-5
19	November 17, 2006	978-4-06-371069-4
20	February 16, 2007	978-4-06-371078-6
21	May 17, 2007	978-4-06-371088-5
22	August 17, 2007	978-4-06-371103-5

==== Shana ou Yoshitsune: Genpei no Kassen ====
No.	Release date	ISBN
1	November 16, 2007	978-4-06-371117-2
2	February 15, 2008	978-4-06-371130-1
3	May 16, 2008	978-4-06-371144-8
4	August 12, 2008	978-4-06-371159-2
5	November 17, 2008	978-4-06-371172-1
6	February 17, 2009	978-4-06-371185-1
7	May 15, 2009	978-4-06-371192-9
8	August 17, 2009	978-4-06-371204-9
9	November 17, 2009	978-4-06-371219-3
10	February 17, 2010	978-4-06-371230-8
11	May 17, 2010	978-4-06-371240-7
12	August 17, 2010	978-4-06-371252-0
13	November 17, 2010	978-4-06-371263-6
14	February 17, 2011	978-4-06-371273-5
15	May 17, 2011	978-4-06-371283-4
16	August 17, 2011	978-4-06-371295-7
17	November 17, 2011	978-4-06-371309-1
18	February 17, 2012	978-4-06-371320-6
19	May 17, 2012	978-4-06-371326-8
20	August 17, 2012	978-4-06-371340-4
21	November 16, 2012	978-4-06-371352-7
22	February 15, 2013	978-4-06-371363-3
23	May 17, 2013	978-4-06-371374-9
24	August 16, 2013	978-4-06-371386-2
25	November 15, 2013	978-4-06-371395-4
26	February 17, 2014	978-4-06-371407-4
27	July 17, 2014	978-4-06-371428-9
28	November 17, 2014	978-4-06-371447-0
29	June 17, 2015	978-4-06-371473-9

== Reception ==
Shana ou Yoshitsune won the award for Best shōnen Manga at the 28th annual Kodansha Manga Award in 2004.
