= Aimi Yoshikawa =

Japanese gravure idol and actress (born 1994)

- 吉川あいみ
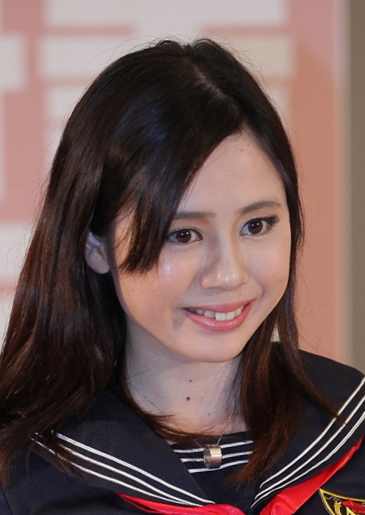
- Yoshikawa in 2017
- Born: 20 March 1994 (age 32); Kanagawa Prefecture, Japan
- Other names: 吉川愛美, Manami Yoshikawa
- Occupations: AV idol, gravure model, actress
- Years active: 2012–2018
- Height: 5 ft 0 in (1.52 m)
- Website: blog.livedoor.jp/aimi_yoshikawa/

Aimi Yoshikawa (Japanese: 吉川あいみ, Hepburn: Yoshikawa Aimi) (born 20 March 1994) is a Japanese gravure idol, actress, and retired AV idol. She was active between 2012 and 2018 and starred in over 200 adult films during her career and was known for her short height and large breasts.

== Life and career ==
Born in Kanagawa Prefecture, in 1994, Yoshikawa debuted as a model in August 2012 with the gravure video Aimi Yoshikawa Rising Star Debut (新星 Debut 吉川あいみ). In December 2012, her switch from mainstream modeling to adult videos (AV) was announced. She made her AV debut in January 2013 in Aimi Yoshikawa AV DEBUT. In December 2013, she was awarded best actress at the SOD Awards.

In 2013, Yoshikawa made her acting debut in a mainstream film in Goddotan Kiss Patience Championship - The Movie, a comedy based on the popular variety show Goddotan. In 2014, she played the main role of "Hazuki Luna" in Ai LOVE Movies! Hen, a 2014 live-action adaptation of the manga series Ikenai! Luna-sensei (“Watch-out! Luna teacher").

A prolific actress, Yoshikawa made appearances in over 280 videos during her AV career in a large variety of roles, including S&M and lesbian roles as well. On November 8, 2018, Yoshikawa announced on Instagram that she would retire from the industry on December 31, 2018, but continue her career as a hostess.
