= Can You Just Die, My Darling? =

Japanese manga series

- First tankōbon volume cover

今夜は月が綺麗ですが、とりあえず死ね (Konya wa Tsuki ga Kirei desu ga, Toriaezu Shine)
- Genre: Horror thriller
- Manga
- Written by: Majuro Kaname
- Illustrated by: Sousou Sakakibara
- Published by: Kodansha
- English publisher: NA: Kodansha USA
- Imprint: Kodansha Comics Monthly Magazine
- Magazine: Shōnen Magazine R (2015–2017; 2020–2021); Monthly Shōnen Magazine (2017–2021)
- Original run: April 20, 2015 – January 20, 2021
- Volumes: 15

Can You Just Die, My Darling? (今夜は月が綺麗ですが、とりあえず死ね, Konya wa Tsuki ga Kirei desu ga, Toriaezu Shine) is a Japanese manga series written by Majuro Kaname and illustrated by Sousou Sasakibara. It was serialized in Kodansha's shōnen manga magazine Shōnen Magazine R from April 2015 to February 2017, and was transferred to Monthly Shōnen Magazine where it ran from April 2017 to January 2021.

== Publication ==
Written by Majuro Kaname and illustrated by Sousou Sakakibara, Can You Just Die, My Darling was serialized from the first issue of Kodansha's Shōnen Magazine R released on April 20, 2015, to February 20, 2017. It was later transferred to Monthly Shōnen Magazine on April 6, 2017. The series then became a digital-only publication resuming its serialization on Shōnen Magazine R on May 20, 2020, and also being published in the digital version of Monthly Shōnen Magazine on June 6 that same year. The seried ended serialization on January 20, 2021. The series' chapters were compiled into fifteen tankōbon volumes as from October 16, 2015, to February 17, 2021. The series' first ten volumes are licensed digitally in English by Kodansha USA.

=== Volumes ===
No.	Original release date	Original ISBN	North American release date	North American ISBN
1	October 16, 2015	978-4-06-371493-7	May 22, 2018	978-1-64-212272-5
2	April 15, 2016	978-4-06-392519-7	July 3, 2018	978-1-64-212309-8
3	October 17, 2016	978-4-06-392548-7	August 7, 2018	978-1-64-212310-4
4	March 17, 2017	978-4-06-392575-3	September 4, 2018	978-1-64-212421-7
5	July 14, 2017	978-4-06-392596-8	October 2, 2018	978-1-64-212465-1
6	November 16, 2017	978-4-06-510451-4	November 6, 2018	978-1-64-212466-8
7	March 16, 2018	978-4-06-511185-7	January 1, 2019	978-1-64-212607-5
8	July 17, 2018	978-4-06-511889-4	May 7, 2019	978-1-64-212844-4
9	November 16, 2018	978-4-06-513461-0	June 25, 2019	978-1-64-212915-1
10	March 15, 2019	978-4-06-514925-6	July 23, 2019	978-1-64-212952-6
11	August 16, 2019	978-4-06-516589-8	—	—
12	November 15, 2019	978-4-06-517628-3	—	—
13	April 16, 2020	978-4-06-519141-5	—	—
14	August 17, 2020	978-4-06-520573-0	—	—
15	February 17, 2021	978-4-06-521946-1	—	—
