= 1+2=Paradise =

Manga series

- Manga cover of 1+2=Paradise

1+2=パラダイス (Ichi tasu Ni wa Paradaisu)
- Manga
- Written by: Sumiko Kamimura
- Published by: Kodansha; Shōbunkan
- Magazine: Monthly Shōnen Magazine
- Original run: 1988 – 1990
- Volumes: 5
- Original video animation
- Directed by: Junichi Watanabe
- Produced by: Kazumasa Fujiie; Kazuo Satō
- Written by: Nobuaki Kishima
- Studio: J.C.Staff
- Released: February 23, 1990 – April 27, 1990
- Runtime: 29 minutes
- Episodes: 2
- icon

1+2＝Paradise (1+2=パラダイス, Ichi tasu Ni wa Paradaisu) is a Japanese manga series by Sumiko Kamimura. The story has been adapted into a two-episode original video animation (OVAs) released by Toei Video, a subsidiary of the Toei Company.

Because of the sexual content the series was one of the manga placed on "Harmful manga" lists by local and national governmental agencies. The negative publicity resulted in Kodansha discontinuing the series.

== Plot ==
The story focuses on Yusuke Yamamoto, the teenage son of two gynaecologists. As a boy, he was almost castrated by his two childhood friends, the twin sisters Yuka and Rika Nakamura, his neighbours, which is why he is afraid of women. Also as a child, he saved the twins from an attacking dog. They grow up with a dream that turns Yusuke's life upside down. At the beginning of the story, they re-appear at the home of Yusuke. His father invites the young women in, to live with them, hoping they will heal his son's gynophobia. The therapeutic benefits of this intended treatment are not entirely clear from the series of, sexually tinted, events that unfold.

== Manga ==
The manga was serialized in Monthly Shōnen Magazine, published by Kodansha, from 1988 to 1990 but discontinued after it met opposition due to the depiction of nudity and sexually tinted content. The manga was re-released by Shōbunkan in 1994 to 1995.

== Characters ==
Yuusuke Yamamoto (山本優介, Yamamoto Yuusuke)
Voiced by: Kappei Yamaguchi
Yuka Nakamura (中村結花, Nakamura Yuuka)
Voiced by: Riyako Nagao

The elder twin who keeps her hair down, and is more modest and reserved.

Rika Nakamura (中村梨花, Nakamura Rika)
Voiced by: Chieko Honda

The younger twin who keeps her hair in a ponytail, she is more playful and is more direct and shamelessly presents herself to Yuusuke in lewd situations.

Yuusuke's Father
Voiced by: Kei Tomiyama

He is the owner of a gynaecology clinic.

== Episode list ==
| No. | Title | Original release date |
|---|---|---|
| 1 | "Around here, there, pudding, pudding" "あっちもこっちもプリンプリン" | February 23, 1990 |
| 2 | "Clash! Momoiro Sisters against lascivious queen bee" "対決！桃色姉妹 V.S．好色女王蜂" | April 21, 1990 |

== Reception ==
In a preview for the February 23, 1990, release of the OVA, the reviewer for the January 1990 issue of Animage magazine notes that 24-year-old Kamimura's popular manga is a little naughty but that the female creator has also attracted a loyal fan base among women despite its erotic content.

Writing a review for Asian Trash Cinema, Jim McLennan observed about the first part of the video adaptation: "The delight of this episode is its sheer, unrelenting, cheerful tackiness. Yes the girls are utter airheads but charges of sexism must be partly countered by the fact that the original manga was created by a woman, Junko Uemura. In addition, Yusuke is just as socially inadequate in his way, which is doubly amusing given that he is a parody of the likely intended target audience."
