= Q.E.D. (manga) =

Japanese manga series

- First tankōbon volume cover, featuring Sou Touma (left) and Kana Mizuhara (right)

Q.E.D. 証明終了 (Kyūīdī Shōmei Shūryō)
- Genre: Detective
- Manga
- Written by: Motohiro Katou
- Published by: Kodansha
- Magazine: Magazine Great (1997–2009); Magazine E-no (2009–2011); Monthly Shōnen Magazine+ (2011–2014)
- Original run: July 1997 – February 2014
- Volumes: 50
- Television drama
- Music by: Shōgo Kaida
- Original network: NHK General TV
- Original run: January 8, 2009 – March 12, 2009
- Episodes: 10
- Manga

Q.E.D. iff
- Written by: Motohiro Katou
- Published by: Kodansha
- Magazine: Shōnen Magazine R (2015–2023); Monthly Magazine Base (2023–2025)
- Original run: April 20, 2015 – February 11, 2025
- Volumes: 30
- Manga

Q.E.D. Univ.
- Written by: Motohiro Katou
- Published by: Kodansha
- Magazine: Monthly Magazine Base
- Original run: March 4, 2025 – present
- Volumes: 2
- icon

Q.E.D. (Japanese: Q.E.D. 証明終了, Hepburn: Kyūīdī Shōmei Shūryō) is a Japanese manga series written and illustrated by Motohiro Katou. It was serialized in Kodansha's shōnen manga magazines Magazine Great (rebranded Magazine E-no in 2009) and Monthly Shōnen Magazine+ from July 1997 to February 2014, with its chapters collected in 50 tankōbon volumes. The series follows Sou Touma, a university graduate who encounters a variety of investigative cases after returning to Japan from the US. He works with his friend, Kana Mizuhara, combining his deductive skills with Mizuhara's social gifts.

A ten-episode television drama adaptation was broadcast on NHK from January to March 2009. A manga sequel, Q.E.D. iff, started in Shōnen Magazine R in January 2015 and was transferred to Monthly Magazine Base online manga platform in February 2023, where it finished in February 2025, and a third series, Q.E.D. Univ., started on Monthly Magazine Base in March of the same year.

In 2009, Q.E.D. won the 33rd Kodansha Manga Award in the shōnen category.

== Plot ==
Kana Mizuhara, a high school girl, becomes the first person to discover a locked room murder case in which her friend's father is the victim, along with her friend. After that, on the first floor of the building where the shooting took place, Kana happens to meet Sou Touma, who recently transferred to another school. Although he graduated from Massachusetts Institute of Technology's mathematics department at the top of his class at the age of 15, for some reason he came to a normal high school in Japan. Kana, learned of his intelligence and high technology and knowledge of electronic devices, and involved him in order to help her.

== Characters ==
=== Main characters ===
Sou Touma (燈馬 想, Tōma Sō)
A highly intelligent but introverted detective who prefers to avoid active investigations unless prompted by his frequent partner, Kana Mizuhara. Initially introduced after Kana rescues him from an altercation at an arcade, he assists her father in solving a murder, leading to their ongoing collaboration. Despite Kana's insistence they are not dating, they are often seen together. Sou graduated from Massachusetts Institute of Technology, but abandoned further studies for unexplained reasons, later enrolling at Kana's high school. Though brilliant, he exhibits childlike fascination with simple phenomena, hinting at an unconventional upbringing. While Kana often reacts violently to his teasing, he remains protective of her. Sou is multilingual, wealthy, and knowledgeable in fields like archaeology and biology. His younger sister, Yuu, shares his linguistic talent but is absentminded.
Kana Mizuhara (水原 可奈, Mizuhara Kana)
A bold, athletic, and compassionate tomboy, excelling in sports like judo and kendo, skills she uses to defend herself and others. Her strong sense of justice frequently involves Sou in investigations. They first meet when she rescues him from a bully, and despite warnings about his mysterious background—including his abrupt departure from MIT—she later enlists his help after her father, a detective, investigates a murder. Though she insists they are not dating, their closeness hints at deeper feelings, particularly when she struggles to define their relationship. Kana is popular and often assumes leadership roles, but her fiery temper surfaces when others speculate about her bond with Sou. She secretly investigates his past, sometimes uncovering unsettling truths, yet remains fiercely protective of him.

=== Supporting characters ===
Detective Mizuhara (水原 警部)
Kana's father is a seasoned, no-nonsense police detective first introduced while investigating the murder of her friend's father. Initially suspicious when he finds Sou alone with Kana in her room, he quickly gains respect for the boy's sharp intellect after Sou helps solve the case. Though gruff in demeanor, he gradually warms to Sou, allowing him to accompany Kana on trips and even inviting him to family outings like baseball games. Over time, he grows accustomed to their constant companionship, no longer questioning their closeness. While protective of his daughter, he acknowledges Sou's reliability and trusts him enough to involve him in both professional and personal matters.
Loki (ロキ, Roki) / Sid Green (シド・グリーン, Sido Gurīn)
An old friend of Sou from MIT, who matches his intelligence but contrasts with a crude, playful demeanor. True to his namesake—the Norse god of mischief—he enjoys riddles and pranks. His first reappearance sparks a confrontation with school staff until Sou intervenes. While he and Sou share a brotherly rapport, Loki's emotional nature often balances Sou's detached logic during cases. Kana generally gets along with him but objects to his smoking habit. When Sou vanishes during the Annie Craner murders, Loki is among those Kana contacts for assistance. Despite his irreverent humor, he proves a reliable ally to both Sou and Kana.
Eva Sukta (エバ・スクタ)
Loki's partner and love interest. She is a dark-skinned Asian woman who studied with him and Sou at MIT. During their university days, she sabotaged Sou's thesis to help Loki, an act Sou later reveals he forgave, understanding her motives. Though Loki initially reacts angrily when the truth surfaces, Sou defends her, having long since moved past the incident. Eva appears periodically throughout the story, usually supporting Loki in investigations. Her relationship with Kana remains neutral, though their interactions are limited compared to Loki's frequent involvement in cases.
Yuu Touma
Sou's younger sister. She is a highly intelligent polyglot who occasionally visits him. Rather than assisting directly in investigations, she provides Sou with contextual insights, sometimes sharing details of his past with Kana—including the Annie Craner incident. When Sou disappears during the related murders in the U.S., Yuu joins Kana in searching for him. Later, she serves as an intermediary for their parents, delivering an invitation for Kana to meet them. Despite her occasional spaciness, Yuu demonstrates perceptiveness about her brother's relationships and history.
Sou and Yuu's parents
Sou's parents remain largely unseen, typically appearing only from the neck down. Their sole full appearance occurs in a flashback to Sou's childhood, when he was falsely accused of stealing a bicycle. The scene reveals their eccentric nature—they abruptly leave the country to settle an argument about the world's largest Buddha statue, despite having just invited Kana to meet them. Through Yuu, they send Kana a letter apologizing for their absence and requesting she continue watching over Sou. This brief glimpse suggests a pattern of unconventional behavior contrasting with Sou's more measured personality.
Annie Craner (アニー・クレイナー)
A young prosecutor Sou befriended in the U.S. who played a significant role in his past. After winning an emotionally difficult case, she was shot and presumed dead—an event Sou witnessed that continues to haunt him. Sou harbored feelings for her, and her apparent death left him guilt-ridden since he had encouraged her to pursue the case. It is later revealed that Craner faked her death and remains deeply concerned for Sou's safety. In one encounter, she kisses his cheek and teases him about Kana's imminent arrival, playfully telling him to "erase the kiss mark" before disappearing.

== Media ==
=== Manga ===
Written and illustrated by Motohiro Katou, Q.E.D. started in Kodansha's shōnen manga magazine Magazine Great's July 1997 issue. Magazine Great was rebranded as Magazine E-no on April 20, 2009, and the series ran in the magazine until it ceased publication on June 22, 2011. The series was transferred to the then brand new magazine Monthly Shōnen Magazine+ on October 20, 2011, until the magazine ceased publication on February 20, 2014. Kodansha collected its chapters in fifty tankōbon volumes, released from December 16, 1998, to February 17, 2015.

A sequel, titled Q.E.D. iff –Shōmei Shūryō– (Q.E.D. iff –証明終了–), started in Shōnen Magazine R on April 20, 2015. Shōnen Magazine R ceased publication on January 20, 2023, and the series was transferred to the online manga platform Monthly Magazine Base on February 14 of the same year. It finished on February 11, 2025. Kodansha collected its chapters in 30 tankōbon volumes, released from June 17, 2015, to April 16, 2025.

A third series, titled Q.E.D. Univ. –Shōmei Shūryō– (Q.E.D. UNIV.－証明終了－), started on Monthly Magazine Base on March 4, 2025. Its first volume was released on August 12, 2025. As of December 17, 2025, two volumes have been released.

=== Drama ===
A ten-episode television drama was broadcast on NHK from January 8 to March 12, 2009. The series stars Aoi Nakamura as Sou and Ai Takahashi as Kana.

== Reception ==
Q.E.D. won the 33rd Kodansha Manga Award in the shōnen category in 2009.
