= Hiroki Yagami =

Japanese manga artist

Hiroki Yagami (八神 ひろき, Yagami Hiroki; born 5 July 1966) is a Japanese manga artist. In 2007, he won the 31st Kodansha Manga Award for shōnen manga for Dear Boys Act II.

== Personal life ==
Yagami was born in Kashiwazaki, Niigata, Japan.

== Works ==
- Futari ni Omakase
- Dear Boys
  - Dear Boys The Early Days
  - Dear Boys Act II
  - Dear Boys Act III
- G-Taste
