= Et Cetera (manga) =

Japanese manga series by Tow Nakazaki

- Et Cetera Volume 1 cover as published by Kodansha on February 13, 1998.

えとせとら (Etosetora)
- Manga
- Written by: Tow Nakazaki
- Published by: Kodansha
- English publisher: NA: Tokyopop
- Magazine: Monthly Shōnen Magazine
- Original run: 1997 – 2000
- Volumes: 9

Et Cetera (Japanese: えとせとら, Hepburn: Etosetora) is a Japanese manga series written and illustrated by Tow Nakazaki. It was licensed in English by Tokyopop. The first volume was released in August 2004; the final volume was published in April 2007.

== Story ==
Mingchao is an orphaned Chinese girl living in an alternate version of the American West. When her grandfather passes away, she inherits the Eto gun, a strange-looking weapon that at first appears broken. On her way home one day, she finds a priest unconscious out in the desert, and so she decides to rescue him. The priest introduces himself as Baskerville, and he becomes curious about her gun. As she tries to hand it to him to let him see it, the gun falls into her rabbit stew. At that moment they are confronted by a bandit who threatens to kill them, but Mingchao uses the Eto gun to shoot him, not realizing the gun was functional. Baskerville notices how the bullet hopped around like a rabbit before hitting the bandit, and believes this gun is something special.

Thus begins a journey that reveals the many mysteries of the Eto gun, a weapon that uses the "essences" of the twelve animals of the Chinese zodiac to fire its bullets. The bullets mimic the behavior of each animal, making the Eto gun the most powerful gun in the West. It doesn't take long for it to catch the attention of bandits and criminals, and most notably the Syndicate, an underground organization that deals in narcotics. As Mingchao learns more about the Eto gun, it becomes apparent this family heirloom has a dark history, and so she travels across the country to discover the truth behind its creation. Along the way, she and Baskerville befriend a fanatic gun collector, two Native Americans, and an enemy turned ally. Their road is paved with adventure, heartache and betrayal, and the joys of friendship. In the end, Mingchao must make a difficult choice: Protect her newfound friends, or protect what she once thought was lost—the last living member of her family.

== Characters ==
=== Mingchao ===
Mingchao (ミンチャオ, Minchao) is an ambitious girl who dreams of becoming a star in Hollywood. Her grandfather created the mysterious Eto gun, which she can fire with the number XII that was accidentally branded on her palm when she was younger. Mingchao has a kind, carefree personality, and can show outstanding courage when her friends are in danger. She is also incredibly fortunate to where Benkate has dubbed her as having the "Devil's Luck" due to her ability to narrowly avoid death or injury. She refuses to kill any person, and often stops others from killing their enemies, no matter how bad they are. This stems from her belief that it is sad whenever someone dies, and that killing someone would make her as bad as the murdering scoundrels she frowns upon. She is very forgiving, even allowing Alternate, a former enemy, to join the group. Her demeanor makes her likable to others, and she builds friendships easily, even with people who dislike her at first. She shares a special bond with Baskerville (or, as she calls him, "Mr. Priest"), and cares about him deeply. She was the most heartbroken when it was everyone thought he had died, even when knowing he might've been using her. When it was discovered he was still alive, but had amnesia and was working for Blush, she was the only one who had any confidence he would regain his memory. She has never wavered in her faith that he's a good person, even when the others, and even Baskerville himself, didn't believe so. She was so ecstatic when he showed the first signs of remembering her that she didn't care that she was falling several dozen feet into a stormy, raging ocean, and she cried happy tears when they were reunited. It is implied several times that she may have romantic feeling towards him despite their obvious age gap, as pointed out by other characters such as Benkate and Luriele. The only real indication is she seems happiest when he's by her side.

When it became clear how many lives were being ruined by the Syndicate, Mingchao and her friends started trying to find a way to stop it. But it seemed the closer they got to discovering what the Syndicate was, the more it seemed Mingchao's family was connected to it somehow. When the gang reached Manhattan, they soon found themselves battered, injured, and in the heart of the Syndicate, face to face with its leader "Gothic". To Mingchao's horror, he reveals himself as her father. Her father then gloated about his dark, underground exploits and how great it was he'd gained so much power. Mingchao, appalled that she shared this man's blood, grew enraged by his callous referrals to all the misery he caused. Her rage and sadness only amplified when Gothic, discovering his daughter didn't agree with him, mercilessly attacked her comrades. Desperate to stop him, Mingchao, with Baskerville's help, shot him with the Eto gun's powerful dragon bullet and he fell to his death. This made Gothic the first, and probably only, life she willingly took. She had to because she'd lose the people she cared about if she didn't. At the series' end, Mingchao goes off to continue following her dream of achieving stardom, and to her great joy, Baskerville decides to join her.

=== Baskerville ===
After Mingchao saves him from vultures, Baskerville (バスカービル, Basukaabiru) introduces himself as a traveling priest. He displays a deadly prowess with throwing knives. When it is shown that his "Bible" actually carries information on the Eto gun, it becomes obvious his goals are much darker than those of a simple missionary. At first he seems to only be using Mingchao to get the Eto gun, but this changes as he begins to care about her. It is later revealed his real name is Razy (レイジー, Reijii)} and he had been a member of The Syndicate, a shady organization that sells drugs and seeks to gather unique guns. The guns they want the most are the Eto and Zodiac guns. It is later shown that Baskerville lost his parents at a young age, leaving him to care for his younger sister, Chisel, whom he doted on. When Chisel fell ill, he joined the Syndicate out of desperation so he could get medicine for her. He gained a reputation as a ruthless killer who showed no mercy, even to children, all for the sake of his sister's health. However, the medicine he was receiving turned out to be a dangerous narcotic that if abused could over time rot the body from the inside out. By the time he learned this it was already too late for Chisel. After Chisel's death, he took on an identity as a wandering priest and started plotting to find and use the Eto gun to kill the Syndicate boss and avenge Chisel. The cross he wears identifies him as a Syndicate member with the engraving of a bride in a wedding dress on the back; however, he now wears the cross in memory of Chisel, as it had been a gift from her. He grows to be devoted to Mingchao; he hates seeing her hurt or cry, and he has wept at the thought of her dying. Because of his affection for her, it becomes a running gag in the series. He is often accused of having a "Lolita-complex", usually by Benkate, and the issue is the subject of a few omakes. Despite his criminal past, he's proven to be a very caring individual. He never goes back on his word once he promises something, and doesn't hesitate to put his life on the line to save his friends, and even people he doesn't know well.

After risking his life to save Mingchao and the others from Gordy, he suffers memory loss when Gordy's gold mine collapses on him, and is later found by Cavanaugh and taken in by Blush. His head injury caused him to suffer from intense headaches that seemed to worsen over time, and Blush starts to offer Baskerville "medicine" for his headaches to make him do his bidding. Unfortunately for Baskerville, he doesn't remember the medicine is the same drug that led his sister to her death. Eventually, Baskerville becomes so dependent on the addictive narcotic that he starts becoming a mental wreck. He begins following even the most dangerous of Blush's demands to get the "medicine", such as picking up a heated Eto gun from a burning furnace. This ended up branding his hand, enabling him to fire the gun. When he regains his memories, he stops experiencing headaches and stops relying on the drug. Later he's able to rejoin Mingchao and the others. In the final battle he is given a powerful dose of opium to numb the pain of his injuries so he can help Mingchao. The dose was so powerful that his lifespan is likely shortened. He decides to live out the rest of his life traveling alongside Mingchao and dedicating himself to helping others whose lives have been ruined by the Syndicate.

=== Benkate ===
Benkate (ベンケイト, Benkeito) is a collector of exotic guns. She enters the series having 99 guns in her possession, with a fierce desire to make the Eto gun, and later the Zodiac, the 100th and 101st guns in her collection. Many of her guns are concealed, some of which are even a part of her own clothing, so she is almost never unarmed. Her favorites include two gun earrings, gun boots, a gun designed to look like a cat, a three-barreled multi-directional pistol, and a powerful seven-foot-long folding rifle. She crossed paths with Baskerville in the past while they were looking for the same gun, though she was never aware of his real name or his ties to the Syndicate. Apparently the conflict resulted in the two having hostile feelings towards each other, until Mingchao forced them to work together. At first glance she's a tall, skinny, somewhat masculine woman with a ruthless disposition who shows no mercy towards anyone who gets between her and a gun she wants, but overtime she shows a more caring side. Like Baskerville, she begins to care about Mingchao as she learns the girl's more endearing and admirable qualities. Her relationship with Baskerville also softens, with the two of them eventually talking like old friends that like to annoy each other but at the same time respect each other. Despite themselves, they work well together, and Benkate likes to flirt with Baskerville and tease him. She is often paired with Yaghi when the group splits up and has protected him on many occasions.

She made a promise with Mingchao to never kill again after Mingchao saved her life. She started off in the series having long, bushy hair tied back with a ponytail, but when she gets captured and held hostage, her hair gets hacked off by Cavanaugh. Benkate later expresses annoyance with her new, shorter haircut, though is grateful that she and everyone else is alive. After the series ends she loses her desire for the Eto and Zodiac guns, and instead goes off to search for another gun that might be worthy of holding the 100th place in her collection.

=== Fino ===
Fino (フィノ, Fino) is a teenage Native American girl who wields the Zodiac gun, which uses the essences of the Constellations. At first she doesn't trust Mingchao or the others, but later accepts them as friends. It is later revealed that her distrust of white people comes from when she met Blush as a small child. Her people found Blush in bad shape and Fino helped nurse him back to health. He'd been kind to her and her people and learned about their ways. But when Fino's parents refused to talk about the tribe's sacred treasure, Blush proceeded to murder them in cold blood with his guns, leaving the two children orphans. After that, she grew bitter and developed a hatred for guns and white men, thinking that no one could be trusted except her own people. Ever since then she's wanted revenge against Blush for deceiving her and ruining her family. She is the most cautious of the group and has a hard time trusting others. She is also a vegetarian.

She had been opposed to Alternate joining the team because he'd been so easily deceived by Blush. It wasn't until he saved her and the others from a monopolizing gang that she finally accepted him. He saves her yet again from Cavanaugh, taking a direct hit from the Eto gun in the process. At one point, she makes him an Indian-styled outfit after his shirt had been ruined. She and Alternate both share a common goal of wanting to bring Blush to justice. After the Syndicate is dissolved, she decides to travel with Alternate to track down Blush.

=== Yaghi ===
Yaghi (ヤギ, Yagi) is Fino's younger brother. He is more trusting and outgoing than his sister. He's very adventurous and cares about his sister a lot. After Benkate saves his life, he starts hanging around her more and looks up to her, and she in turn looks out for him. An omake drawn by one of Nakazaki's assistants shows that Yaghi dreams of one day making Benkate his wife, though he fears his sister wouldn't approve. Yaghi is very talkative and friendly to other people, which makes him likable to others. However, he is sometimes too trusting, as once he allowed the Zodiac to be taken away while his sister was taking a bath. Yaghi is also incredibly brave for his age and is willing to do anything for people he cares about, though this causes worry for Fino since it puts him at risk of being hurt. A testament to his bravery is how he willingly stayed behind with Benkate to help her hold off a band of hooligans in order to let Mingchao and the others get away, despite the danger it put him in. At the end of the series he went with Fino and Alternate to return to his village.

=== Alternate ===
Alternate (オルタネート, Orutanēto) is the first recurring antagonist, who later becomes a hero. He is intelligent and a decent gunman, and is identified by the monocle he wears over his left eye. He wants to get his hands on the Eto gun, and makes several failed attempts to do so. His father, Gordy, a member of the Syndicate, is betrayed and murdered by fellow member Blush. Blush then told Alternate that Mingchao had done it. He becomes obsessed with revenge and is tricked into obeying Blush. Upon learning Blush was the true killer, Alternate assists the others in saving Mingchao from Blush. From then on he vows to find and punish Blush for what he did. When he wants to join the others, all seem to oppose the idea except Mingchao. After rescuing Fino, Yaghi, and Big, the others accept him as well.

Alternate had a very lonely life, as he was almost the polar opposite of Mingchao. He would lie, cheat, and hurt people to get what he wanted. Because of this, he had never had a single friend. However, like many of the other characters, he begins to change under Mingchao's influence, and his true personality eventually comes out. He is somewhat insecure, partly due to guilt and a disbelief that he'll be forgiven for all the trouble he caused. But he has proven to be brave in the face of danger, willing put his life on the line to defend his friends. He saves Fino's life twice, once taking a bullet in the chest from the Eto gun for her. She seems to reciprocate these feelings at least in part, when she makes him a new shirt after his old one is ruined. She also expresses worry after he is injured saving her. He goes off with Fino and Yaghi when the gang splits up at the end.

=== Blush ===
Blush (ブラッシュ, Burasshu) is a member of the Syndicate. He is sneaky, manipulative, and cruel. He killed Fino's parents as well as Gordy, Alternate's father, and tricked Alternate into thinking that Mingchao had done it. He used both Alternate and Baskerville to try to get his way, but ultimately did not succeed as he was later duped by Cavanaugh. He despises Cavanaugh despite her being his superior in the Syndicate. He claims she took credit for one of his reports and stole his bonus. After she tricks him he tries to bring her down, even when it meant helping out Mingchao briefly. He is noted for his ability to fire up to twelve bullets at once with his two guns.

Blush disappears after Cavanaugh's attack on the ship heading for New York. At the end of the story, an omake by one of Nakazaki's assistants jokes that Blush was killed by the giant energy wave created by the Eto gun's dragon bullet.

Concept art shows a female version of Blush, as Tow Nakazaki had been unsure whether he wanted Blush to be male or female. He eventually settled on a male character.

=== Cavanaugh P. Script ===
Cavanaugh (キャバナー, Kabanā) is a high-ranking member of the Syndicate and considered to be one of the most feared and cruel of them all. She at first appears to be an authoritative figure with the ability to hold a stern hand over her peers, but she is sadistic, calculating, and controlling. She becomes increasingly sociopathic and violent as the story progresses, and her obsession with killing Mingchao and her companions escalates. She had found Baskerville after he'd lost his memory. After Blush took him and she discovered Baskerville could fire the Eto gun, she sought to bring him to her side. She used a concentrated form of a potent drug to convince Baskerville to do her bidding, though he defected after his memory returned. She loses her right eye in a train accident resulting from a gunfight between herself, Baskerville, and Mingchao's friends. Following the injury she swears revenge against them for scarring her face. She brands XII into her palm so she is able to use the Eto gun, though the brand later gets destroyed when her hand is scarred by a shot from the Zodiac gun. She is killed after falling from a high flight of stairs in a battle with Mingchao and her friends.

=== Gothic ===
Gothic is the boss of the Syndicate as well as Mingchao's father. He wants to rule all of the United States in revenge for the death of his wife, Mingchao's mother, who died because she couldn't get proper medical treatment as a Chinese immigrant in America. He bleached his hair, damaged his vocal cords to change his voice, and wore a mask to disguise that he was actually Chinese. Mingchao declares that neither he nor she should exist, and he is the first and probably only life she takes, if only to put a stop to the misery he's caused others. He is ultimately killed by the Eto gun's dragon bullet.

== The Eto Gun and the Zodiac ==
=== Hypothetical Bullets ===
Fans writing to Tow Nakazaki came up with ideas for other bullets, such as firing two different bullets to create a combined bullet. For instance, a Pegasus bullet could be created using bird and horse bullets, and Virgo with a snake bullet would create a mermaid bullet. Snake bullets were also a popular discussion, with an idea of combining the Eto gun's snake with the Zodiac's serpent (Ophiuchus, which wasn't included in its repertoire). These were among several ideas presented by fans.

One of Nakazaki's assistants wished a cat bullet had been included as well.

== Release ==
Et Cetera was licensed for an English-language release in North America by Tokyopop, which released the nine volumes from August 10, 2004, to April 10, 2007. The series has gone out of print. The series is also licensed in French by Glénat.

=== Volume list ===
No.	Original release date	Original ISBN	English release date	English ISBN
01	February 13, 1998	9784063336146	August 10, 2004	9781595321305
02	July 15, 1998	9784063336337	October 12, 2004	9781595321312
03	October 14, 1998	9784063336498	December 14, 2004	9781595321329
04	February 15, 1999	9784063336665	February 8, 2005	9781595321336
05	June 15, 1999	9784063336825	May 10, 2005	9781595321343
06	October 13, 1999	9784063336986	October 11, 2005	9781595321350
07	April 12, 2000	9784063337204	April 11, 2006	9781595321367
08	September 12, 2000	9784063337365	October 10, 2006	9781595321374
09	January 15, 2001	9784063337532	April 10, 2007	9781595321381

== Reception ==
The first volume placed 77th on the list of the 100 bestselling graphic novels for July 2004, with 1630 copies sold.
