= Ryūrōden =

Japanese manga series

- Cover art of the first volume of the manga.

龍狼伝 (Ryūrōden)
- Manga
- Written by: Yoshito Yamahara
- Published by: Kodansha
- Magazine: Monthly Shōnen Magazine
- Original run: 1993 – 2007
- Volumes: 37
- Manga

Ryūrōden: Chugen Ryōran-hen
- Written by: Yoshito Yamahara
- Published by: Kodansha
- Magazine: Monthly Shōnen Magazine
- Original run: 2007 – 2016
- Volumes: 17
- Manga

Ryūrōden: Ouha Rikkoku-hen
- Written by: Yoshito Yamahara
- Published by: Kodansha
- Magazine: Monthly Shōnen Magazine
- Original run: 2016 – present
- Volumes: 10

Ryūrōden (龍狼伝; lit. 'Legend of Dragon and Wolf'), translated as Legend of the Dragon's Son, is a Japanese manga series written and illustrated by Yoshito Yamahara. It was serialized by Kodansha in Monthly Shōnen Magazine from 1993 to 2007 and collected in 37 tankōbon volumes; in 2005 it was reprinted in 10 bunkoban volumes. In 1997, it won the Kodansha Manga Award for shōnen manga. It is followed by a sequel series, Ryūrōden: Chugen Ryōran-hen (龍狼伝 中原繚乱編), which was serialized in Monthly Shōnen Magazine from 2007 to 2016 and collected in 17 volumes and later Ryūrōden: Ouha Rikkoku-hen (龍狼伝 王霸立国編) from 2016 to present and collected in 10 volumes.

Outside Japan, all three series are licensed in Taiwan by Tong Li, in Indonesia by Elex Media Komputindo, and South Korea by Final.

Ryūrōden is about Japanese teenagers Shiro and Masumi who are swallowed by a dragon on flying to China on a junior high school trip. They find themselves in China in the year 207 during the prelude to the Three Kingdoms period, at the start of the campaign leading to the Battle of Red Cliffs. As they learn how to survive, in part through Shiro's knowledge of Luo Guanzhong's historical 14th century novel Romance of the Three Kingdoms (as well as his growing aptitude for martial arts), they become known as "Dragon Leader" and "Dragon Princess," working for Liu Bei and Cao Cao, respectively.
