= Motohiro Katou =

Japanese manga artist

Motohiro Katou (Japanese: 加藤 元浩, Hepburn: Katō Motohiro) is a Japanese manga artist, best known for creating the Q.E.D. series.

He made his debut on game-related works for Enix. Presently he publishes his detective manga works on Kodansha.

In 2009, he received the Kodansha Manga Award for his work on Q.E.D..

== Works ==
- Q.E.D.
- Rocket Man (manga)
- C.M.B.
