= Mikuru Uchino =

Japanese gravure idol (born 1988)

- Born: March 4, 1988 (age 38); Tokyo, Japan
- Modeling information
- Height: 1.57 m (5 ft 2 in)
- Hair color: Light Brown, but naturally Black
- Eye color: Black
- Agency: Shining Production
- Website: http://www.fitone-firststage.com/profile/mikuru.html

Mikuru Uchino (内野未来, Uchino Mikuru; born March 4, 1988) is a Japanese gravure idol, represented by the talent agency Shining Production, formerly by FITONE. She is from Tokyo and strongly interested in a Japanese hard rock duo, B'z.

Her show-business name was simply Mikuru (未来), until May 2009.

== Filmography ==
=== TV Programs ===
- Rank Okoku (ランク王国), TBS 2007
- Dokidoki!? Newscaster #11 #12 (ドキドキ!? にゅ～すキャスター #11 #12), MONDO21 2008
- God Tongue ～The God Tongue Kami no Shita～ (ゴッドタン ～The God Tongue 神の舌～), TV Tokyo 2008
- Hisho no Kagami (秘書のカガミ), TV Tokyo 2008
- AKIBA-tteki!! (AKIBAッテキ!!), Enta!371 2008
- Touch Me Idol (タッチミーアイドル), STAR Karaoke, 2008
- Reader's How to Book (リーダー'S ハウ トゥ Book), TV Asahi 2008
- Geinokai Tokubetsu Jugyo! Watashi wa Koushite Ikinokori mashita! (芸能界特別授業! 私はこうして生き残りました!), TBS 2008
- Dospe 2 (ドスペ2), TV Asahi 2008
- Zenryoku-zaka (全力坂), TV Asahi 2009

=== V-Cinema ===
- Kyodai Heroine Melodia (巨大ヒロイン メロディア), Zen-pictures 2008

=== Image DVD ===
1. Mikuru Naisho Ainyu G no Kofuku (未来 ナイショ 愛乳Gの幸福), C&H 2008
2. Kyukyoku Otome Mikuru Uchino Pussy Cat (究極乙女 内野未来 Pussy Cat), Media Force 2009
3. Kyukyoku Otome Mikuru Uchino Pretty Girl Lovely Days (究極乙女 内野未来 Pretty Girl Lovely Days), Media Force 2009
4. Yawa-chichi (柔乳), Saibunkan Publishing 2010

== Bibliography ==
=== Magazines ===
- CAPA September 2008, pp. 147–153, Gakken 2008
- Nikon D700 Superbook (ニコン D700 スーパーブック), Gakken 2008

=== Digital photobooks ===
- Mikuru Doga-tsuki Shashinshu (未来 動画付写真集), GIRLS TRAIN 2009
- Mikuru Didital Shashinshu "Nurse to Bikini no Gap" (未来 デジタル写真集 「ナースとビキニのギャップ」), ASPECT Didital Media
