= The New York Times Manga Best Sellers of 2012 =

This is a list of notable manga series that appeared in The New York Times Manga Best Seller lists in 2012.

Notable series in the 2012 New York Times Manga Best Seller lists
Year	Title	Artist	Notes	Sources
1983	Message to Adolf	Osamu Tezuka		
1990	GTO: The Early Years	Tooru Fujisawa		
1991	Sailor Moon	Naoko Takeuchi		
1992	X	Clamp		
1993	Magic Knight Rayearth	Clamp		
1994	Case Closed	Gosho Aoyama		
1994	Neon Genesis Evangelion	Yoshiyuki Sadamoto		
1997	Pokémon Adventures	Hidenori Kusaka		
1997	Excel Saga	Rikdo Koshi		
1997	One Piece	Eiichiro Oda		
1998	Tenjho Tenge	Oh! great		
1998	Love Hina	Ken Akamatsu		
1999	20th Century Boys	Naoki Urasawa		
1999	Dorohedoro	Q Hayashida		
1999	Naruto	Masashi Kishimoto		
2000	Tokyo Mew Mew	Reiko Yoshida		
2000	The Wallflower	Tomoko Hayakawa		
2000	Battle Angel Alita: Last Order	Yukito Kishiro		
2001	Fullmetal Alchemist	Hiromu Arakawa		
2001	Bleach	Tite Kubo		
2001	Twin Spica	Kou Yaginuma		
2002	Finder	Ayano Yamane		
2002	Skip Beat!	Yoshiki Nakamura		
2002	Genshiken	Shimoku Kio		
2002	Gunslinger Girl	Yu Aida		
2002	Ouran High School Host Club	Bisco Hatori		
2002	Air Gear	Oh! great		
2003	xxxHolic	Clamp		
2003	Dawn of the Arcana	Rei Tōma		
2003	Negima! Magister Negi Magi	Ken Akamatsu		
2003	Yotsuba&!	Kiyohiko Azuma		
2002	Loveless	Yun Kōga		
2003	Ghost in the Shell	Masamune Shirow		
2003	Three Wolves Mountain	Bohra Naono		
2004	The Tyrant Falls in Love	Hinako Takanaga		
2004	Soul Eater	Atsushi Ōkubo		
2004	D.Gray-man	Katsura Hoshino		
2004	Rosario + Vampire	Akihisa Ikeda		
2004	Kitchen Princess	Miyuki Kobayashi; Natsumi Ando		
2004	The Drops of God	Tadashi Agi		
2004	Chi's Sweet Home	Kanata Konami		
2004	Vampire Knight	Matsuri Hino		
2004	Bamboo Blade	Masahiro Totsuka		
2005	Black God	Dall-Young Lim; Park Sung-woo		
2005	Higurashi When They Cry	Ryukishi07; Karin Suzuragi	There are eight arcs in this series.	
2005	Sayonara, Zetsubou-Sensei	Kōji Kumeta		
2005	Jack Frost	JinHo Ko		
2005	Neon Genesis Evangelion: Shinji Ikari Raising Project	Osamu Takahashi		
2005	Fluffy, Fluffy Cinnamoroll	Yumi Tsukirino		
2005	The Betrayal Knows My Name	Hotaru Odagiri		
2005	Bunny Drop	Yumi Unita		
2005	The Melancholy of Haruhi Suzumiya	Nagaru Tanigawa; Noizi Ito; Gaku Tsugano	Part of the Haruhi Suzumiya media franchise	
2005	Dance in the Vampire Bund	Nozomu Tamaki		
2005	Yu-Gi-Oh! GX	Naoyuki Kageyama; Kazuki Takahashi		
2006	Witch Buster	Jung-Man Cho		
2006	Ninja Girls	Tanaka Hosana		
2006	Jormungand	Keitarou Takahashi		
2006	Pandora Hearts	Jun Mochizuki		
2006	Omamori Himari	Milan Matra		
2006	Ai Ore!	Mayu Shinjo	also Ai Ore! Love Me!	
2006	The Story of Saiunkoku	Sai Yukino		
2006	Highschool of the Dead	Daisuke Satō		
2006	House of Five Leaves	Natsume Ono		
2006	Young Miss Holmes	Kaoru Shintani		
2006	Fairy Tail	Hiro Mashima		
2006	Tegami Bachi: Letter Bee	Hiroyuki Asada		
2006	Black Butler	Yana Toboso		
2007	Otomen	Aya Kanno		
2007	Black Bird	Kanoko Sakurakoji		
2007	A Certain Scientific Railgun	Kazuma Kamachi		
2007	Bloody Monday	Ryumon Ryo		
2007	Phoenix Wright: Ace Attorney	Kenji Kuroda		
2007	Oresama Teacher	Izumi Tsubaki		
2007	Toradora!	Yuyuko Takemiya		
2007	Library Wars: Love & War	Hiro Arikawa		
2007	Spice and Wolf	Isuna Hasekura		
2007	Alice in the Country of Hearts	QuinRose; Soumei Hoshino		
2007	Dengeki Daisy	Kyousuke Motomi		
2007	Psyren	Toshiaki Iwashiro		
2008	Kamisama Kiss	Julietta Suzuki		
2008	Nura: Rise of the Yokai Clan	Hiroshi Shiibashi		
2008	Monster Hunter Orage	Hiro Mashima		
2008	The Melancholy of Suzumiya Haruhi-chan	Puyo	Part of the Haruhi Suzumiya media franchise	
2008	Maximum Ride	Narae Lee		
2008	The Earl and the Fairy	Mizue Tani		
2008	Bakuman	Tsugumi Ohba; Takeshi Obata		
2008	Arata: The Legend	Yuu Watase		
2008	A Bride's Story	Kaoru Mori		
2008	Cage of Eden	Yoshinobu Yamada		
2008	Sakura Hime: The Legend of Princess Sakura	Arina Tanemura		
2008	March Story	Hyung-min Kim; Kyung-Il Yang		
2009	Arisa	Natsumi Ando		
2009	Blue Exorcist	Kazue Katō		
2009	Durarara!!	Ryohgo Narita		
2009	Yu-Gi-Oh! 5D's	Masahiro Hikokubo		
2009	Alice in the Country of Clover: Bloody Twins	QuinRose; Mamenosuke Fujimaru	Related to Alice in the Country of Hearts	
2009	Blood Lad	Yūki Kodama		
2009	Attack on Titan	Hajime Isayama		
2009	Flowers of Evil	Shūzō Oshimi		
2009	Mardock Scramble	Tow Ubukata		
2009	The Limit	Keiko Suenobu		
2009	Ghost in the Shell: Stand Alone Complex	Yu Kinutani		
2009	Alice in the Country of Clover: Chesire Cat Waltz	QuinRose; Mamenosuke Fujimaru	Related to Alice in the Country of Hearts	
2010	Is This a Zombie?	Shinichi Kimura		
2010	Haganai	Yomi Hirasaka; Itachi		
2010	Alice in the Country of Hearts: My Fanatic Rabbit	QuinRose; Owl Shinotsuki; Delico Psyche		
2010	Yu-Gi-Oh! Zexal	Shin Yoshida		
2011	Soul Eater Not!	Atsushi Ohkubo		
2011	Puella Magi Madoka Magica	Magica Quartet; Hanokage		
2011	Soulless	Gail Carriger		
2011	Pokémon: Black and White	Hidenori Kusaka		
2011	Honey Darling	Norikazu Akira		
2012	Infernal Devices	Cassandra Clare; Hyekyung Baek	An OEL manga adaptation of the novel trilogy.	
