= Zero: Dragon Blood =

- Genre: Tokusatsu; Horror; Drama
- Created by: Keita Amemiya
- Written by: Sumiko Umeda
- Directed by: Keita Amemiya; Ikko Yamagishi; Fumie Arakawa
- Starring: Ray Fujita
- Opening theme: "DRAGONFLAME" by JAM Project
- Ending theme: "Zoë ~Beautiful World~" by Dustz
- Composers: Yoshichika Kuriyama; Shiho Terada
- Country of origin: Japan
- Original language: Japanese
- No. of episodes: 13

Production
- Executive producer: Kiyotaka Ninomiya
- Producers: Ichiro Hika; Masanori Sakai
- Running time: 24-25 minutes (per episode)

Original release
- Network: TX Network
- Release: January 6 – March 31, 2017

Related
- Garo: Makai Retsuden; Kami no Kiba: Jinga

Zero: Dragon Blood (絶狼〈ZERO〉－DRAGON BLOOD－, Zero Doragon Buraddo) is a Japanese television series and spin-off of the Garo metaseries. As with Zero: Black Blood, the series' protagonist is Rei Suzumura, once again performed by Ray Fujita.

== Plot ==
=== Prologue ===
Centuries ago, there were no Makai Knights and only Makai Priests. It was darker times and humanity often sacrificed their own children to spare themselves from the predatory Horrors. One day, a baby was rescued by a Makai Dragon and raised him as his own, he would be known as Dragon Knight Edel. Seeing the incredible Horror-slaying abilities of dragon power, the Makai Order wanted it for themselves and kidnapped one for study. Edel fought against the priests that would kidnap his dragon partner, Nova, and their egg. Nova sacrificed herself by burning all the priests and shelled Edel from the inferno before transforming into a forest. Within the center lies the unborn dragon egg, hidden from humanity until modern times. A little girl, Alice Hiromi, discovered that egg in recent times and bonded with it until the Makai Order found the egg. In an age of Makai Knights, the order decided to have it sealed away in a secret place of dangerous artifacts, however, Alice wants the egg back.

=== Main Story ===
In the aftermath of Black Blood, Rei gets relocated to Rune City as his new district. Rei meets and rescues (adult) Alice from a Horror Den. She has become a photographer on a secret quest to be reunited with the Dragon Egg. Although Rei resisted Alice's persistent inquiry about the Dragon Egg, she always found herself at the center of trouble and even stayed at the Lupo Bar (Rei's base of operations) to learn more about things. In between Rei taking on Horrors and protecting Alice from harm, a duo of sibling priests, Kagome (little sister) and Okina (big brother) sought a means to attain greater power. Okina wanted to make Kagome stronger and sought the power of the Dragon Knight. Okina stole the dragon shell that encased the Dragon Knight and freed Edel in hopes he could help him. Still harboring great anger against the Makai Order, Edel killed Okina instead. Kagome was no match against Edel and was defeated in combat.

The Makai Order made an alert to Rei about Edel and he was reunited with Priestess Rekka to help protect the Dragon Egg from Edel. They planned to seal the egg in a magical container to prevent it from being used if lost. Alice stumbled upon their location and was finally reunited with the egg, but so was Edel. Unwilling to be separated from the egg, Edel activated his armor and fought Zero. In the midst of the chaos, Alice had the egg and container in hand and sealed the egg. Although Edel escaped with the egg, the magical lock prevents him from directly interfacing with the egg; only Alice's hand can unlock the container.

Kagome would appear and attempt to kill Alice, believing that if Alice dies, it will prevent Edel from accessing the egg. Rei stopped her and Rekka intervened to prevent bloodshed. At Lupo Bar, the group learned about Kagome's story and she agreed not to harm Alice and even agreed to protect her. Rekka gave Alice a protection charm against Edel, but Kagome cancelled its magic in hopes to lure out Edel and it worked. Alice was taken by Edel and he convinced her to unlock the seal. Rei, Rekka, and Kagome found Alice and they fought against Edel. Ultimately, Kagome decided to sacrifice herself along with Edel. She created a magical explosion that killed both of them. The surviving members buried Kagome and returned to base.

The order decided to have the egg destroyed to prevent further problems, but Alice took the egg away before they had the chance. To Alice's surprise, the egg hatched and a baby dragon appeared. She decided to name the dragon Loop and plan to leave town. However, both Rei and Rekka found her and demanded Loop back. Alice attempted to flee, but encountered a horror. Loop saved her from the attack, but it severely weakened him to near death. Edel secretly survived his fight and teleported Alice and Loop away from Rei so he could save his child. Having knowledge about dragon physiology, Edel told Alice that Loop needs to feed on makai energy to heal and grow. Edel placed Loop near a dimensional fault for the baby to absorb the latent energies. However, Rei and Rekka soon found them.

Edel fought Rei and Rekka and the tide was turned when Loop was reborn as an adult dragon. Edel thought Loop would be loyal to him as he's the father, but the dragon was bonded to Alice. She stopped the fight and escaped with Loop. However, Zero and Rekka gave chase and battled against the dragon. Weakened from the fight, Alice decided to symbiotically bond with Loop so he would have the power to use his wings for flight. Alice secretly had a low view of humanity and wants to burn civilization to help bring back the beauty of nature; Zero prevented Loop from burning the city and fought the dragon.

Going past his armor's time limit, Zero turned into a Lost Soul Beast and developed dragon-like features as his bestial armor chewed on Loop. Ultimately, Rekka helped reset Zero's armor and returned Rei back to normal. Loop was mortally wounded and dying. Because Alice bonded with Loop, she's dying along with Loop. As Loop transformed into a forest, Rei jumped to the center to find Alice and held her until she faded away, leaving a small dragon egg behind. In the aftermath, Rei took some time to mourn for Alice and returned to his duties as the Silver Knight.

== Episodes ==
No.	Title	Written by	Original release date
1	"Silver Wolf" "Ginrō" (銀狼)	Sumiko Umeda	January 6, 2017
2	"Dancing Girl" "Maihime" (舞姫)	Sumiko Umeda	January 13, 2017
3	"Pistol" "Kenjū" (拳銃)	Sumiko Umeda	January 20, 2017
4	"Dragon-Man" "Ryūjin" (竜人)	Sumiko Umeda	January 27, 2017
5	"Eternity" "Eien" (永遠)	Sumiko Umeda	February 3, 2017
6	"Kagome" "Kagome" (籠目)	Sumiko Umeda	February 10, 2017
7	"Twin Swords" "Sōken" (双剣)	Sumiko Umeda	February 17, 2017
8	"Photograph" "Shashin" (写真)	Sumiko Umeda	February 24, 2017
9	"Motherliness" "Bosei" (母性)	Sumiko Umeda	March 3, 2017
10	"Legend" "Densetsu" (伝説)	Sumiko Umeda	March 10, 2017
11	"Temple" "Shinden" (神殿)	Sumiko Umeda	March 17, 2017
12	"Smile" "Bishō" (微笑)	Sumiko Umeda	March 24, 2017
Finale	"World" "Sekai" (世界)	Sumiko Umeda	March 31, 2017

== Cast ==
- Rei Suzumura (涼邑 零, Suzumura Rei): Ray Fujita (藤田 玲, Fujita Rei)
- Alice Hiromi (尋海 アリス, Hiromi Arisu): Kokoro Aoshima (青島 心, Aoshima Kokoro)
- Rekka (烈花): Mary Matsuyama (松山 メアリ, Matsuyama Meari)
- Kagome (カゴメ), Hanatsumi (花罪): Yuria Haga (芳賀 優里亜, Haga Yuria)
- Kurehi (クレヒ): Kuran (紅蘭)
- Bakura (バクラ): Guadalcanal Taka (ガダルカナル・タカ, Gadarukanaru Taka)
- Edel (エデル, Ederu): Tomohisa Yuge (弓削 智久, Yuge Tomohisa)
- Madō Necklace Silva (魔導具シルヴァ, Madōgu Shiruva; Voice): Ai Orikasa (折笠 愛, Orikasa Ai)

== Theme songs ==
Opening theme

- "DRAGONFLAME"
  - Lyrics: Masami Okui
  - Composition: Hiroshi Kitadani
  - Arrangement: Kenichi Sudō
  - Artist: JAM Project

Ending theme

- "Zoë ~Beautiful World~"
  - Lyrics: Ray
  - Composition: Dustz, L!TH!UM
  - Arrangement: L!TH!UM
  - Artist: Dustz
