= Aoshima =

Aoshima is a Japanese name meaning "blue island". It is most commonly written as 青島, but may also be written 青嶋, 蒼島, and 青嶌.

Aoshima may refer to:

== Companies ==
- Aoshima Bunka Kyozai, a well-known Japanese model car, model aircraft and model ship manufacturer

== Places ==
- Aoshima, Miyazaki, an island in Miyazaki Prefecture, Japan
- Aoshima, Ehime, a tiny island offshore of Ehime Prefecture, Japan, also known as Cat Island

== People ==
- Aoshima (surname)

== See also ==
- Qingdao, also written 青島
