= Trois (disambiguation) =

Trois is a 2000 erotic thriller film.

Trois may also refer to:

- 3 in French
- Trois 2: Pandora's Box, a 2002 sequel to the film
- Trois: The Escort, a 2004 sequel to the film
- Trois (album), 2011 album by Japanese rock band Dustz

== See also ==
- Ménage à trois
