= Aoshima (surname) =

Aoshima (written: 青島 or 青嶋 lit. "blue island") is a Japanese surname. Notable people with the surname include:

- Chiho Aoshima (青島 千穂; born 1974), Japanese artist
- Fumiaki Aoshima (青嶋 文明; born 1968), Japanese footballer
- Kokoro Aoshima (青島 心; born 1999), Japanese actress and model
- Mirai Aoshima (青嶋 未来; born 1995), professional shogi player
- Takuma Aoshima (青島 拓馬; born 1993), Japanese footballer
- Yukio Aoshima (青島 幸男; 1932–2006), Japanese politician

Fictional characters:

- Toshiyuki Aoshima, character from the manga series Oh My Goddess!
- Kazuya Aoshima, character from the anime and game series Little Battlers Experience
