= Salvation, Swallowed by the Nest =

Japanese manga series

- Salvation, Swallowed By the Nest
- Cover of vol. 1, first released on October 31, 2024

救い、巣喰われ (Sukui, Sukuware)
- Genre: Romance, thriller
- Manga
- Written by: Kotoko
- Illustrated by: Kamo
- Published by: Micro Magazine
- Imprint: Comic Rouge
- Original run: February 28, 2022 – present
- Volumes: 4
- Television drama
- Directed by: Akimori Sakami; Naoki Tsukuda; Meru Tsukada
- Written by: Erika Tōyama
- Music by: Rina Okade
- Studio: Media Pulpo
- Licensed by: Rakuten Viki
- Original network: MBS
- Original run: February 12, 2026 – April 9, 2026
- Episodes: 9
- icon

Salvation, Swallowed by the Nest (Japanese: 救い、巣喰われ, Hepburn: Sukui, Sukuware) is a Japanese manga series written by Kotoko and illustrated by Kamo. Salvation, Swallowed By the Nest is serialized on digital book platforms by Micro Magazine under the label Comic Rouge since February 28, 2022.

A live-action television drama adaptation was broadcast from February 12, 2026, (Note: TV Kanagawa and Chiba TV broadcast the episodes from February 12, 2026, to April 9, 2026, 1.5 hours earlier than its scheduled time on MBS.) to April 9, 2026 as part of MBS's programming block Drama Tokku.

== Plot ==
Ama Minase is a rookie idol singer who is constantly bullied by the other members in her group. While running errands, Ama has a chance encounter with famous actor Chiaki "Aki" Hosho, who asks her to fill in for another actress after she drops out. Ama's acting impresses and interests Chiaki, leading to a budding acting career for her and a friendship between them.

Unbeknowst to Ama, Chiaki hides a troubled past and a tendency to have sex with women while discarding them when they fall in love. He romantically pursues Ama on a bet he makes with Kairi Asakura, but he begins to fall in love with her for real after Ama shows him genuine kindness and helps him process his traumatic childhood. As Chiaki's love for her deepens, his obsession over her intensifies and he goes great lengths to eliminate anything that threatens their relationship.

== Characters ==
Ama Minase (南瀬 天, Minase Ama)
Portrayed by: Tamami Sakaguchi
Ama is a singer and member from a rookie idol group who begins a career in acting after a chance encounter with Chiaki. She comes from a poor family. Her father disappeared while her mother is often at work, leaving her to be the sole caretaker of her younger siblings. Despite her hardships, Ama keeps a positive spirit.
Chiaki Hosho (宝生 千秋, Hōshō Chiaki)
Portrayed by: Noa
Chiaki is a popular actor and former idol singer who works under the stage name Aki Hosho (宝生 アキ, Hōshō Aki). Despite his gentlemanly demeanor, he often sleeps around with women and would discard them the moment they confessed their love to him. Initially getting close to Ama as a dare from Kairi, he comes to love her for real after realizing she is genuinely kind. However, this causes him to become obsessively posessessive with her, to the point of threatening to eliminate anything that interferes with their relationship. Manga critic Mei Chan highlights him as an example of a yandere and suggests that him being abused by his mother as a child is the reason to why he controls his feelings in an "abnormal" way.
Anna Saotome (早乙女 杏夏, Saotome Anna)
Portrayed by: Amane Uehara
Anna is a member of Ama's idol group. She dislikes Ama and manipulates the other members into bullying her. She sleeps with directors and producers in hopes of securing high-profile work in entertainment, leading her to become resentful towards Ama's acting career.
Kairi Asakura (朝倉 浬, Asakura Kairi)
Portrayed by: Haruse Akune
Kairi is a popular actor who is a friend of Chiaki's and a bad influence to him. Like Chiaki, he often engages in sexual relationships, but he is later revealed to have attended the same high school as Ama in addition to being both her upperclassmen and her first love. Though they were close, Kairi had forced himself upon Ama to get over his grief over his family dying, an action that he regrets to this day. After running into her again, his love for her rekindles.
Yū Kisaragi (如月 優雨, Kisaragi Yū)
Yū is a newcomer actor who co-stars with Ama in a television drama. He greatly admires both Ama and Chiaki until he is led to believe that Chiaki is manipulating Ama.
Shiki Motomiya (元宮 識, Motomiya Shiki)
Portrayed by: Hideharu Suzuki
Shiki is a member of Chiaki's former idol group and acts as his confidant.
Rin (凛)
Portrayed by: Kokoro Aoshima
Rin is an actress who is cast alongside Ama and Kairi in a movie. She adores Ama.
Tanuma (田沼)
Portrayed by: Koutaro Tanaka
Tanuma is a movie director.
Seira (セイラ)
Portrayed by: Yumi Wakatsuki
Seira is a famous actress and Chiaki's ex-girlfriend. Her parents sold her to the entertainment industry when she was young, where she was often abused by her clients. She bonds with Chiaki over their shared traumatic pasts.
Hibiki (響)
Portrayed by: Aira
Hibiki is an actress who was one of Chiaki's ex-girlfriends. When she confessed her love to him, Chiaki breaks up with her and threatens to leak a sex video if she returns to see him again.

== Media ==
=== Manga ===
Salvation, Swallowed by the Nest is written by Kotoko and illustrated by Kamo. It is serialized digitally by Micro Magazine under the Comic Rouge label on digital book distribution platforms since February 28, 2022, with early releases distributed through Comic CMoa. The chapters were later released in four bound volumes under the Comic Rouge imprint.

No.	Japanese release date	Japanese ISBN
1	October 31, 2024	9784867166529
2	November 28, 2024	9784867166703
3	January 31, 2025	9784867167069
4	July 3, 2025	9784867168103

=== Television drama ===
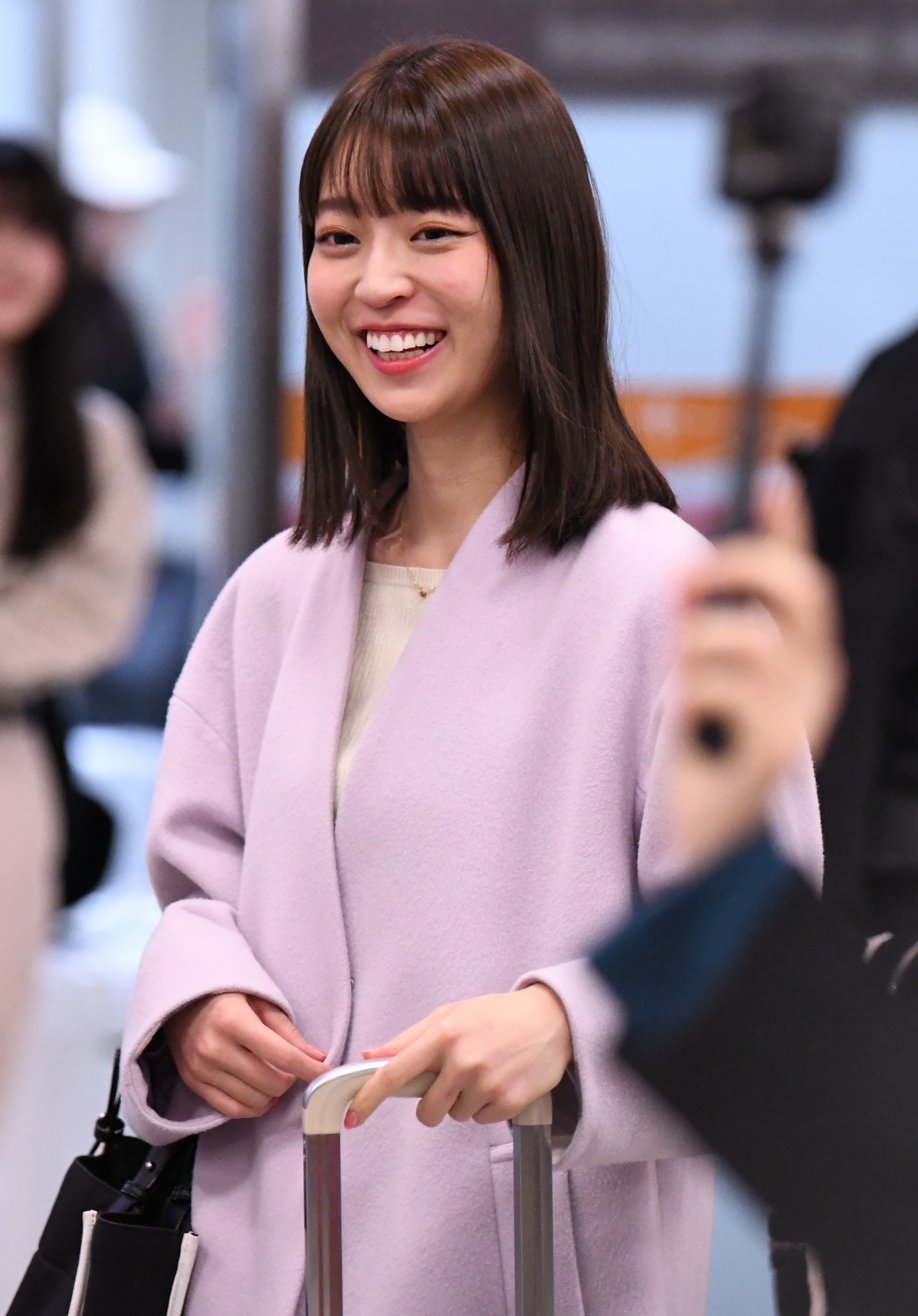
Tamami Sakaguchi (pictured in 2020) starred as Ama in the live-action television drama adaptation.

A live-action television drama adaptation of Salvation, Swallowed by the Nest was announced on January 19, 2026. The series is directed by Akimori Sakami, Naoki Tsukuda, and Meru Tsukada. The scriptwriter is Erika Tōyama. The series stars Tamami Sakaguchi as Ama and Noa as Chiaki. One of the ways Sakaguchi prepared for the role was buying and cutting cabbage, as Ama was portrayed to be good at cooking. The drama was Noa's first lead acting role, when he was given the offer to portray Chiaki, he read the manga and accepted it, as the character was the opposite of his own personality. He also found Chiaki to be "messed up" and even "scary" at some points, but also thought he was easy to portray as Chiaki has a "cool" appearance. To prepare, he watched live-action films to see how other actors portray "madness." He stated that while playing Chiaki, he would lower his voice and pay attention to his movements to look "cool" like the character. Icex member Haruse Akune was later announced as Kairi. Supporting cast members include Koutaro Tanaka as Tanuma, Amane Uehara as Anna, Hideharu Suzuki as Shiki, Kokoro Aoshima as Rin, Yoshiyuki Tsubokura as Suzui (Ama's manager), and Ryōko Yuui as Natsumi Hosho (Chiaki's mother). Additional cast members consist of Yumi Wakatsuki as Seira and Watwing member Rintarō Hachimura as himself.

The television drama was broadcast on MBS as part of their programming block Drama Tokku, as well as TV Kanagawa, Chiba TV, TV Saitama, Tochigi Television, and Gunma Television, from February 12, 2026, (Note: MBS lists the premiere date as February 12, 2026, at 25:09, which is February 13, 2026, at 1:09 a.m. Episode 2's premiere date is on February 19, 2026, at 26:33, which is February 20, 2022, at 2:33 a.m. Subsequent episodes are broadcast on Thursdays at 24:59, which are Fridays at 12:50 a.m.) to April 10, 2026, with a total of 9 episodes. TV Kanagawa and Chiba TV broadcast the episodes from February 12, 2026, to April 9, 2026, 1.5 hours earlier than its scheduled time on MBS. Episodes were also released for streaming online for TVer and MBS Dōgaism for one week after its initial broadcast, while FOD allowed viewing for an indefinite time period.

The opening theme song is "Hyakunichisō" by Mahiru and the ending theme song is "Say Yes" by Noa. Noa based "Say Yes" on Chiaki's character and "put [Chiaki's] feelings" into the song as if the character wrote it. The series is available internationally with English subtitles on Rakuten Viki.

==== Episodes ====
No.	Title (Note: All titles are taken from FOD.)	Directed by	Written by	Original release date
1	"The Worst Meeting, and the Best Trap"; Transliteration: "Saiaku na Deai to, Saikō no Wana" (Japanese: 最悪な出会いと、最高の罠)	Akimori Sakami	Erika Tōyama	February 12, 2026
When Ama's group forces her to buy drinks for them, she witnesses Chiaki breaking up with Hibiki, culminating in them accidentally splashing the drinks on her. Because Hibiki had dropped out of filming, Chiaki gets Ama to fill in for her. Ama's acting and behavior interests Chiaki. He convinces a director to give her a part in a movie he is starring in, while Ama's manager warns her not to get close to him. Later that night, Kairi makes a bet with Chiaki over whether he can woo Ama, using Chiaki's watch as the prize.
2	"An Irresistible Attraction"; Transliteration: "Aragaenai Inryoku" (Japanese: 抗えない引力)	Akimori Sakami	Erika Tōyama	February 19, 2026
Jealous of Ama's success, Anna falsely accuses her of stealing her necklace, manipulating the other members into turning against her. Ama confides in Chiaki, and despite him attempting to seduce her, her positive and warm personality leaves him surprised. Ama invites him over to her home for dinner, where he meets her family. When Chiaki's mother visits him to extort him for money, Ama stands up to her, protecting him.
3	"The Boundaries Begin to Melt"; Transliteration: "Toke Hajimeru Kyōkaisen" (Japanese: 溶け始める境界線)	Akimori Sakami	Erika Tōyama	February 26, 2026
Ama comforts Chiaki as he shares with her that his mother had abused him since childhood, and Chiaki realizes that he has fallen in love with her. When Anna harasses Ama, Chiaki comes to her defense, revealing that he had recorded her planting her necklace in Ama's bag. During the auditions for Tanuma's movie, Ama encounters Kairi, who is revealed to have been her first love from high school. Ama shares her concerns over being in Tanuma's movie, which is a mature love story, and Chiaki asks her to date him for those experiences.
4	"A Painful Attachment"; Transliteration: "Uzuku Shūchakushin" (Japanese: 疼く執着心)	Akimori Sakami	Erika Tōyama	March 5, 2026
Chiaki confesses to Ama that he is in love with her and asks her to try dating him, to which she accepts. Kairi confides in Chiaki about Ama without revealing her identity, revealing that he had forced himself on her in high school; however, Ama later reconnects with Kairi, assuring him that she is not upset with him anymore. Anna overhears other actresses gossiping about Chiaki being a playboy, and she decides to use this as revenge against him. As Ama continues to audition for Tanuma's movie, Chiaki learns that the female lead has a bed scene and secretly convinces Tanuma not to cast her. He continues to be jealous when he sees Ama interact with other actors, but Ama assures him that she returns his feelings, leading to them dating for real. Meanwhile, Seira returns from Hollywood.
5	"An Inescapable Nest"; Transliteration: "Nigerarenai Su" (Japanese: 逃げられない巣)	Naoki Tsukuda	Erika Tōyama	March 12, 2026
While Chiaki and Seira reunite, after Kairi discovers Ama is cast in Tanuma's movie as the female lead's best friend, he requests to be cast in it as well. Uncertainty consumes Chiaki once again as he orders Ama to leave the movie's welcoming party. During the ride home, Ama lies to Chiaki about Kairi being in the movie; however, he learns the truth from Rin. Chiaki realizes that Kairi was Ama's first love and angrily assaults him, leading to Ama and the staff intervening. At his apartment, Chiaki confronts Ama for hiding the truth about Kairi from him and forces himself on her.
6	"Insanity Born from Love"; Transliteration: "Aiyue no, Kyōki." (Japanese: 愛ゆえの、狂気。)	Meru Tsukada	Erika Tōyama	March 19, 2026
Chiaki stops and regrets his actions when he sees Ama in a state of shock, but Ama tells him that she will be keeping her distance from him, causing him to spiral into a mental breakdown. When Anna brings Ama to meet with Hibiki, Ama learns about Chiaki dating, dumping, and blackmailing women on a constant basis, information that Kairi also corroborates. This leads her to calling Chiaki to break up with him, while Anna leaks Chiaki and Kairi's fight over Ama to the tabloids. Tanuma suggests to Ama and Kairi to spend time together to get into their characters more; however, Chiaki witnesses Kairi visiting Ama's apartment later in the evening.
7	"Our Body Temperatures Melt Together"; Transliteration: "Tokeau Taion" (Japanese: 溶け合う体温)	Meru Tsukada	Erika Tōyama	March 26, 2026
As Ama and Kairi spend time together, Kairi suggests the idea of dating, but she rejects him. The movie shoot concludes smoothly, but Ama's manager warns her that the tabloids are planning to publish an article about Chiaki and Kairi fighting over her. To Ama's surprise, Chiaki has the tabloids run an article about his past instead to protect her. Though Ama remains conflicted over Chiaki, she realizes she still loves him, and they consummate. Later, Chiaki confronts Anna over leaking information to the tabloids and leaks a photo of her leaving a love hotel with a producer. Meanwhile, Ama is cast in a drama with Seira.
8	"The Cruel Boundaries"; Transliteration: "Zankoku na Kyōkaisen" (Japanese: 残酷な境界線)	Akimori Sakami	Erika Tōyama	April 2, 2026
Seira provokes Ama to be jealous of her relationship with Chiaki, while reminding Chiaki of his twisted nature. Meanwhile, Chiaki's mother returns to extort him for money on threats of ruining Ama's career. Chiaki reflects on how his mother tainted his view of women, while Ama saved him from it. To protect Ama, he breaks up with her.
9	"Is the Final Destination "Pure Love" or "Destruction"?"; Transliteration: "Shūchakuten wa "Jun'ai" ka "Hametsu" ka" (Japanese: 終着点は「純愛」か「破滅」か)	Akimori Sakami	Erika Tōyama	April 9, 2026
After learning about the break-up and Chiaki's mother, Seira and Kairi persuade Ama to save Chiaki. Ama meets with Chiaki, but he insists that staying apart is the only way he can protect her. When Chiaki's mother again comes by to extort Chiaki, he learns that she had previously met with Ama, who is willing to anything to protect him even if it means sacrificing her career or hurting others. Realizing that Ama cares for him deeply, Chiaki stands up for himself, but he allows his mother to walk away as he has come to accept her for who she is. Chiaki and Ama get back together and resume their careers, as Ama reveals she is just as twisted as he is.

== Reception ==
By January 2026, Salvation, Swallowed by the Nest sold a cumulative total of 500,000 digital copies. Manga critic Mei Chan describes Chiaki's appeal as a yandere as one of the highlights of the manga, describing that his intense love for Ama lets readers questioning "what lies behind his words and actions" and what it is like to "deeply care for someone."
