= Zero: Black Blood =

- Theatrical poster

Japanese name
- Kanji: 絶狼〈ZERO〉－BLACK BLOOD－
- Directed by: Ryu Kaneda
- Written by: Yasuko Kobayashi
- Based on: Garo by Keita Amemiya
- Produced by: Ichiro Higa
- Starring: Ray Fujita
- Cinematography: Jiro Nomura
- Edited by: Kumiko Sakamoto
- Music by: Kiyoshi Yoshikawa; Yuzuru Jinma
- Production company: Tohokushinsha Film
- Distributed by: Tohokushinsha Film
- Release dates: March 8, 2014 (White Chapter); March 22, 2014 (Black Chapter)
- Country: Japan
- Language: Japanese

Zero: Black Blood (絶狼〈ZERO〉－BLACK BLOOD－, Zero Burakku Buraddo) is a Japanese film duology and television miniseries, a spin-off from the Garo television series. The film is split into two portions. The White Chapter (白ノ章, Shiro no Shō), which comprises the first three episodes of the miniseries, had a limited theatrical release on March 8, 2014, and the Black Chapter (黒ノ章, Kuro no Shō), the last three episodes, had a limited theatrical release on March 22, 2014. The film was also shown on the Japanese cable television channel Family Gekijo as a six-episode miniseries from March 5 through March 7, 2014, with two episodes shown each night.

Ray Fujita stars as the lead character Rei Suzumura, the Silver Fanged Knight Zero, reprising his role as the character from the previous television series and films. The films/miniseries explore this character who served a supporting role in the previous productions and his investigation of a joint human and Horror commune led by the Horror Ring.

== Plot ==
Zero: Black Blood is set after the events of the film Garo: Soukoku no Maryu. Rei Suzumura, Zero the Silver Fanged Knight, is patrolling on his own when he encounters the white Horror Ring, who has created a commune where Horrors and humans live together in harmony, so long as one human a month allows themselves to be devoured by the Horrors. Rei, along with Makai Priest Cain and the knight-in-training Yuna are ordered by the Makai Senate to slay Ring and free the humans under his thrall by means of Yuna's mother the Makai Priestess Iyu.

== Episodes ==
No.	Title	Original release date
1	"Dolce"; Transliteration: "Chi no Doruche" (Japanese: DOLCE 血のドルチェ)	March 5, 2014
At Club Lupo, Rei Suzumura is alerted to a Horror sitting nearby as he finds a group of Horrors about to eat a bloodied man that Silva identifies as being called a Blood Dolce. After killing off two of the Horrors as Zero, Rei encounters another in a white suit that overwhelms him with his feathers before telling him not to interfere as he takes the man named Katou with them. With Silva unable to track the mysterious Horror, knowing that Katou is beyond saving yet feels he deserves a better death, Rei asks his Madōgu to report the turn of events to the Western Watchdog. The next day, Rei is attacked by a mysterious girl with a Makai Blade, but their fight is interrupted by an eccentric man. After introducing herself as Yuna, she apologizes to Rei, saying she just wanted to test him, and her Makai Priest partner Kain explains that they have been assigned to work with Rei in going after the Horror he encountered: Ring. Rei does not trust either of them yet decides to hear them out after Yuna reveals Ring's unorthodox intent to create a human/Horror coexistence. As Rei treats Yuna and Kain to Club Lupo, Katou is fed to the Horrors in Ring's community.
2	"Community"; Transliteration: "Komyuniti" (Japanese: COMMUNITY コミュニティ)	March 5, 2014
Eating at Club Lupo, Kain reveals that Ring's planned coexistence requires only a few humans sacrificed. Once getting the information, Rei walks off with Yuna adamant to convince the Makai Knight to work with them. After stopping him and Kain from fighting, Yuna explains that she uses the Makai Blade of her father, a Makai Knight who died fighting Ring two years ago, with Kain having grafted the Makai Knight's bone into her arm so she can use her father's sword. Meanwhile, after accidentally hitting a woman with his car, killing her, a young man named Satoshi Wanda calls his girlfriend Natsumi of what happened and frets of learning of the woman's death. As night falls, Satoshi is visited by Ring who offers him a place in his utopia. When Natsumi almost ends up becoming the host of a Horror once she finds Satoshi, Rei arrives with Yuna and Kain as the three fight the Horror before Rei dons his Zero armor to kill it. Seeing Natsumi alive yet unconscious, Rei and his group realize they must infiltrate Ring's community.
3	"Enemy"; Transliteration: "Gaiteki" (Japanese: ENEMY 外敵)	March 6, 2014
Satoshi meets Koichi Nakaima who gives him a tour of the community, learning that Ring's beloved Iyu is a human who possesses a singing voice that instills calmness in the humans. After the tour, after giving Satoshi a card so he can call Natsumi, Nakaima is summoned by Ring to know that the number of Blood Dolces must be increased by two in relation to the Horror population. After Satoshi makes the call, Natsumi tells Rei's group of his location. However, the group learns that Ring has moved the community as the Horror attempts to have Rei understand his way of thinking. Upon seeing Rei's group is beyond reasoning, Ring prepares to kill them when Iyu appears and is revealed to be Yuna's mother before she is spirited off by Ring. Meanwhile, after being sent to Club Lupo to wait for the group's return, Natsumi has a visit from Nakaima.
4	"Dream"; Transliteration: "Shinjitsu no Yume" (Japanese: DREAM 真実の夢)	March 6, 2014
In the community's new location, Satoshi worries about Natsumi until he is calmed down by Iyu after Ring has convinced her that Yuna is safe. After waking the next day, and finding Silva on her neck, Yuna learns that they have been saved by her singing voice. This causes Yuna to remember her time with her parents ten years prior until she caused her mother's blindness and apparent death. When Rei demands to know the meaning for the turn of events, Kain explains that Yuna was assumed dead, as he was partnered to Kuroudo two years ago and witnessed the Makai Knight's death when they saw Iyu. When they arrive at Club Lupo, Natsumi drinks Lupo's Magic Tea so Rei, Yuna, and Kain can track her, but Kain is shocked to hear about Rei's intent to use Iyu to get to Ring. Yuna hears the whole thing as Silva reveals the song she knows to be Iyu's lullaby. The three track Natsumi down to a temple where Nakaima intends to avoid being chosen in the lottery by making her a Blood Dolce. Though Nakaima attempts to cover his actions by claiming to be a stalker before escaping, Kain places a trace on his car. However, they find Nakaima's car damaged after Ring took him to be punished as a mandatory Blood Dolce.
5	"Decision"; Transliteration: "Ketsui" (Japanese: DECISION 決意)	March 7, 2014
The group arrives at the commune's location too late, once again, finding the whole area to be empty. Rei and his group realize that they are getting through to Ring, as they bring one of Ring's discarded feathers to Club Lupo so they track the Horror down to his commune's new location. This time, Rei tells Yuna not to assist in fighting Ring, as Iyu could be executed for her participation in the Horror's scheme. Though Yuna is adamant to carry out the deed, Rei defeats her in a duel to show her that she does not need to do it. Meanwhile, after placing Satoshi in charge of the humans due to his ties to Natsumi, Ring reminds Iyu of the day their paths crossed because her singing voice which allowed their dream to become a reality. Back at Club Lupo, Natsumi brings in Satoshi as Rei is alerted that Ring's location has been found. After explaining his reasons of fighting to those at Club Lupo, Rei runs off to face Ring, with Yuna and Kain following. After fighting his way through the lesser Horrors, Rei finds Ring and holds Iyu at blade's length.
6	"Savior"; Transliteration: "Kyūseishu" (Japanese: SAVIOR 救世主)	March 7, 2014
After explaining the Makai Knights' conduct with human lives when it appears he is planning to kill Iyu, Rei proceeds to fight Ring, who reveals that he left his feather behind on purpose so they can settle this in a battle of both blades and ideals. Even after Ring attempts to have the humans kill him, Rei refuses to stray from his ideals. Yuna and Kain arrive soon after, dealing with the Horrors before they find Iyu. Ultimately, Yuna lacks the will to kill her mother as Iyu uses sings to soothe her. This pacifies the angry mob as Ring finds Iyu singing for her daughter instead of for himself. This causes Ring to assume his true Horror form as ends up falling back into his instincts and devours Iyu after she refuses to sing for him. Once they get the other humans to safety, Rei dons the Zero armor to fight Ring on the back of his Madō Horse Ginga. Once Ring is crippled, Yuna makes her move to make the Horror bleed before being ordered by Zero to sing so they can pacify a healed Ring long enough to destroy him. With Ring no more, Rei tells Yuna that Iyu intentionally allowed Ring to kill her to atone for her actions. Soon after, as Yuna and Kain leave the city, Rei resumes his nightly patrol.

== Cast ==
- Rei Suzumura (涼邑 零, Suzumura Rei): Ray Fujita (藤田 玲, Fujita Rei)
- Yuna (ユナ): Riria Kojima (梨里杏)
- Cain (カイン, Kain): Naoki Takeshi (武子 直輝, Takeshi Naoki)
- Iyu (イユ): Karia Nomoto (野本 かりあ, Nomoto Karia)
- Bakura (バクラ): Guadalcanal Taka (ガダルカナル・タカ, Gadarukanaru Taka)
- Ring (リング, Ringu): Thane Camus (セイン・カミュ, Sein Kamyu)
- Kuroudo (クロウド, Kurōdo): Shogen (尚玄, Shōgen)
- Katou (カトウ, Katō): Zuimaro Awashima (粟島 瑞丸, Awashima Zuimaro)
- Satoshi Wanda (湾田 サトシ, Wanda Satoshi): Yuki Sera (世良 優樹, Sera Yūki)
- Natsumi Suemori (末守 ナツミ, Suemori Natsumi): Mayo Onuki (大貫 真代, Ōnuki Mayo)
- Kousuke Nakaima (仲井間 コウスケ, Nakaima Kōsuke): Hassei Takano (高野 八誠, Takano Hassei)
- Ura (ウーラ, Ūra): Satomi Hiraguri (平栗 里美, Hiraguri Satomi)
- Sare (サーレ, Sāre): Asaki Kuwahara (桑原 麻紀, Kuwahara Asaki)
- Era (エーラ, Ēra): Miori Yoshida (吉田 澪里, Yoshida Miori)
- Shire (シーレ, Shīre): Saki Hagiyama (萩山 沙貴, Hagiyama Saki)
- Man Horror (A) (男ホラーA, Otoko Horā Ē): Yasuyuki Hirano (平野 靖幸, Hirano Yasuyuki)
- Man Horror (B) (男ホラーB, Otoko Horā Bī): Kondou Tatsuya (近藤 起矢, Tatsuya Kondō)
- Woman Horror (A) (女ホラーA, On'na Horā Ē): Nordi (のーでぃ, Nōdi)
- Woman Horro (B) (女ホラーB, On'na Horā Bī): Ai Tsuchiya (土屋 愛, Tsuchiya Ai)
- Man Horror (C) (男ホラーC, Otoko Horā Shī): Takuya Matsuda (松田 拓也, Matsuda Takuya)
- Man Horror (D) (男ホラーD, Otoko Horā Dī): Masaya Mimura (三村 昌也, Mimura Masaya)
- Customer (A) (客A, Kyaku Ē): Daisuke Honda (本田 大輔, Honda Daisuke)
- Customer (B) (客B, Kyaku Bī): Shaq (シャック, Shakku)
- Woman (女, On'na): Ayako Hino (日野 綾子, Hino Ayako)
- Young Yuna (幼いユナ, Osanai Yuna): Chiari Komori (小森 茅愛, Komori Chiari)
- Silva (シルヴァ, Shiruva; Voice), Customer (C) (客C, Kyaku Shī): Ai Orikasa (折笠 愛, Orikasa Ai)
- Priest (神官, Shinkan; Voice): Rintarō Nishi (西 凛太朗, Nishi Rintarō)

== Songs ==
Opening theme

- "ZERO -BLACK BLOOD-"
  - Lyrics: Masami Okui
  - Composition: Hiroshi Kitadani
  - Arrangement: Masaki Suzuki
  - Artist: JAM Project

Ending theme

- "S#0 (Scene Number Zero)" (S#0（シーンナンバーゼロ）, Shīn Nanbā Zero)
  - Lyrics: Ray
  - Composition: Dustz, L!TH!UM
  - Artist: Dustz
