= Zodiac P.I. =

Mystery manga series

- Cover of the first volume of the English-language translation as published by Tokyopop (2003), depicting the protagonist Lili

十二宮でつかまえて (Jūnikyū de Tsukamaete)
- Genre: Mystery
- Manga
- Written by: Natsumi Ando
- Published by: Kodansha
- English publisher: NA: Tokyopop (former)
- Magazine: Nakayoshi
- Original run: April 2001 – January 2003
- Volumes: 4

Zodiac P.I. (Japanese: 十二宮でつかまえて, Hepburn: Jūnikyū de Tsukamaete; lit. "Catch the 12 Zodiac Constellations!") is a mystery manga series written and illustrated by Natsumi Ando. Appearing as a serial in the monthly shōjo (targeted towards girls) manga magazine Nakayoshi from the April 2001 issue to the January 2003 issue, the chapters were compiled into four bound volumes by Kodansha and published from November 2001 to March 2003. Set in present-day Japan, the series focuses on Lili Hoshizawa, a teenage detective who uses astrology to solve cases.

In North America, Tokyopop licensed the series for an English-language translation, and published it from July 2003 to December 2003, although the translation has since gone out of print. The series has also been translated into other languages. The series has been generally reviewed as being light entertainment.

== Plot ==
Set in modern-day Japan, the series centers on 13-year-old extrovert Lili Hoshizawa (星沢リリ, Hoshizawa Riri), who uses astrology to solve crimes, and manages her missing mother's fortune-telling business on the side. Her childhood friend, Hiromi Oikawa (及川ひろみ, Oikawa Hiromi), assists her, after he returns from the United States, where he studied criminal psychology. As Detective Spica, Lili uses the magical star ring, left to her by her missing mother, to aid her in solving crimes by consulting with one of the twelve astral spirits in the ring and learning the victim's horoscope. Her father, Inspector Hoshizawa (インスペクタ星沢, Insupekuta Hoshizawa), disapproves of her actions. Periodically, she encounters rival private investigator Sirius (シリウス, Shiriusu), who tests her mystery-solving skills.

While solving cases, Lili eventually learns from Hiromi's elder sister, Megumi Oikawa (及川めぐみ, Oikawa Megumi), that Hiromi's allergy to girls resulted from her: ten years ago, he waited in the rain for Lili to show after he left her a love letter. Lili encounters Zeus (ゼウス, Zeusu), a fortuneteller and hypnotist who kidnaps her father. After Hiromi rescues him, Zeus takes Hiromi captive and demands the star ring in exchange. Realizing that Sirius is her missing mother, Lili frees her from Zeus's hypnosis. Lili learns that her mother disappeared to protect her family from Zeus, who hates Sirius, as he believes that she kidnapped his girlfriend and caused her to become comatose. Lili uncovers the truth: his girlfriend feared that he desired the star ring more than her love and asked Sirius to stage a kidnapping and have him decide between her or the star ring. When he hesitated, she was devastated and threw herself off the cliff. After learning this, Zeus loses his desire for the star ring and lets Lili, Hiromi, and Lili's mother leave. Lili accepts Hiromi's love for her. In the conclusion, Lili's mother takes over her fortune-telling business, and Lili continues to solve crimes with Hiromi's assistance.

== Development ==
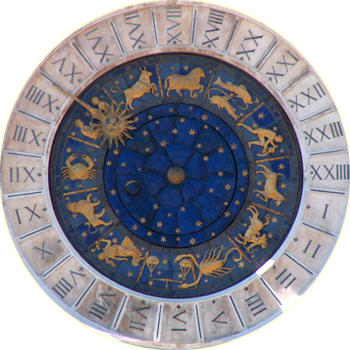
An astrological clock, showing all the signs of the zodiac.

Manga artist Natsumi Ando enjoyed astrology in her childhood and had a fondness for stars and Greek mythology. For File 2, which deals with a mystery in a piano school, Ando researched a local music school. The design for the Libra astral spirit originated from the winner of the Astral Spirit Design Contest; many of the design submissions were for the Libra, Pisces, and Cancer spirits.

Ando included references to Greek mythology in Zodiac P.I. in the names of the astral spirits. The astral spirit of Virgo, Demeter, takes her name from the goddess of the harvest, while the astral spirit for Capricorn, Parn, is a reference to the god Pan. Astrea, the astral spirit for Libra, is named after the goddess of justice. The twin astral spirits for Gemini take their names from twin brothers Castor and Pollux. The centaur Chiron is alluded to in the name of the astral spirit for Sagittarius. The name of astral spirit for Taurus is a reference to the woman Io. The astral spirit for Pisces and the spirit for Aquarius take their names from the goddess of love and Ganymede, respectively. Other references include stars. Ando named Antares, the astral spirit of Scorpio, Praesepe, the astral spirit of Cancer, and Regulus, the astral spirit of Leo, after the Antares, Praesepe and Regulus stars, respectively. Aries is the only astral spirit that named after the zodiac itself.

== Release ==
Written and illustrated by Natsumi Ando, Zodiac P.I. appeared as a serial in the monthly manga magazine Nakayoshi from the April 2001 issue to the January 2003 issue. It published the series in four bound volumes from November 6, 2001, to March 4, 2003.

In North America, Tokyopop licensed the series for an English-language translation. It published the series from July 8, 2003, to December 9, 2003; the translation has since gone out of print. Zodiac P.I. has also been translated into other languages, such as Finnish, German, and Italian.

=== Volume list ===
No.	Original release date	Original ISBN	English release date	English ISBN
1	November 6, 2001	978-4-06-178977-7	July 8, 2003	978-1-59182-383-4
File 01: Footprints of the Virgo (Parts 1–2); File 02: Requiem for the Scorpio (Parts 1–3); File 03: Black Hole of the Leo; Extra: The Star Talk (Antares & Demeter)
2	June 6, 2002	978-4-06-178992-0	September 9, 2003	978-1-59182-384-1
File 03 (Continued): Black Hole of the Leo; File 04: Labyrinth of the Capricorn; File 05: Cards of the Libra (Parts 1–2); File 06: The Doll of the Gemini (Part 1); Extra: The Star Talk (Regulus, Parn, Astrea, Castor and Pollux)
3	October 4, 2002	978-4-06-178999-9	November 4, 2003	978-1-59182-385-8
File 06: The Doll of the Gemini (Part 2); File 07: A Love Letter from Sirius (Parts 1–2); File 08: Wedding Reception of the Pisces (Parts 1–2); Extra: Lili and Hiromi's First Case, The Star Talk (Chiron, Aries and Io)
4	March 4, 2003	978-4-06-364013-7	December 9, 2003	978-1-59182-412-1
File 09: Zeus' House of Tricks (Parts 1–2); File 10: Reunion With Mom; File 11: Where the Truth Is; File 12: When You Wish Upon a Star; Extra: The Star Talk (Aphrodite, Ganymede and Praesepe)

== Reception ==
Zodiac P.I. generally received positive reviews from English-language critics as light entertainment. Joseph Dexter of Mania Entertainment praised the series as light entertainment with nice plot twists; he enjoyed the different personalities of the astral spirits. In his review of the second volume, Anime News Network's Allen Divers described the series as similar to Detective Conan and wrote that despite the predictable endings, the series was potentially enjoyable for readers interested in astrology and mysteries. According to Jason Thompson, author of Manga: The Complete Guide, the series worked as light and "formulaic" entertainment for a young audience, and the artwork proved easy to understand.
