= Noa (Amuse singer) =

Japanese singer-songwriter

- Born: Noa Kazama; March 13, 2000 (age 26); Tokyo, Japan
- Genres: J-pop; R&B
- Occupations: Singer; songwriter; actor
- Years active: 2020–present
- Label: Universal
- Website: noamusic.jp

Noa Kazama (born March 13, 2000), known mononymously as Noa, is a Japanese singer and actor associated with Amuse. He debuted as a singer in 2020 with the song "Lights Up". In 2023, he released his debut album, No.A, which reached no. 2 on Oricon and Billboard Japan.

Noa made his acting debut in the television drama I Will Be Your Bloom (2022), of which he was also part of the show's in-universe boy band 8loom. After resuming his acting career in 2025, he starred in his first leading role in Salvation, Swallowed by the Nest (2026).

== Early life ==
Noa became interested in music after watching High School Musical and began composing music in elementary school. He is also a fan of Big Bang and planned on eventually auditioning for K-pop agencies after moving to South Korea. While living in South Korea, he became fluent in Korean and English. He initially attended an international school in South Korea, but YG Entertainment requested that he drop out of school to focus on their academy after he passed their audition.

== Career ==
In 2012, after relocating to South Korea due to his mother's job, Noa was scouted by a hairstylist for K-pop artists, who encouraged him to audition. He became a trainee at YG Entertainment, and after training for seven years, he left the company in 2018 to return to Japan. Noa made the decision after seeing One Ok Rock performing in Seoul, inspiring him to "[share] music from [his] country to the world." Noa signed with Amuse, Inc. and released his debut single, "Lights Up", on January 10, 2020, as a digital single in both Japanese and Korean versions. The song was co-produced with Millennium, another former YG trainee who Noa had been friends with since they were 12 years old. On June 12, 2020, Noa released his second digital single, "Taxi", which featured Tofubeats. The song received at least 1 million playbacks on YouTube as of 2020 and also reached No. 1 on Spotify's Viral Chart in Thailand.

On March 5, 2021, Noa released the digital single "Too Young", a collaboration with Twopee Southside. On March 13, 2021, Noa held his first online concert on his 21st birthday. Later in the year, he announced that he will be releasing one digital single per month over the course of three months. "Let Go", featuring Jeon Woong from AB6IX, was released on August 22; "Don't Waste My Time" was released on September 19; and "Highway" was released on October 10.

On March 4, 2022, Noa released the song "True Colors" digitally, which was used in a campaign by the brand Liese. On May 6, 2022, Noa was announced to star in TBS' television drama I Will Be Your Bloom as Takumi Kurushima, which was set to premiere in October 2022. He will also participate in the drama's in-universe boy band 8loom, where he was announced as the fifth member of the group. On April 3, 2022, Noa released the song "It Ain't Over" digitally, of which the song was produced by KM-Markit. On September 9, 2022, Noa released the song "Paradise" digitally; the song was produced by Tofubeats.

On March 22, 2023, Noa released his debut studio album, No.A, which featured "Purple Sky" as its lead track.

== Endorsements ==
Throughout his music career, Noa has modeled and endorsed brands such as Marc Jacobs and Crocs. He also served as a brand ambassador for Liese, of which his song "True Colors" was featured in a campaign.

== Artistry ==
Noa cites Justin Bieber and Chris Brown as his musical influences, in addition to being a fan of Big Bang.

== Discography ==
=== Studio albums ===
List of studio albums, with selected chart positions, sales figures and certifications
Title	Album details	Peak chart positions		Sales
Title	Album details	JPN Oricon	JPN Hot	Sales
No.A	Released: February 22, 2023; Label: Universal Music; Formats: CD, digital download	2	2	JPN: 61,437
Primary Colors	Released: May 29, 2024; Label: Universal Music; Formats: CD, digital download	3	5	JPN: 22,385
Clean+Noise	Released: October 28, 2026; Label: Universal Music; Formats: CD, digital download	16	—	JPN: 5,532

=== Singles ===
Title	Year	Peak chart positions	Album
Title	Year	JPN Hot	Album
"Lights Up"	2020	—	No.A
"Taxi" (featuring Tofubeats)	2020	—	No.A
"Too Young" (featuring Twopee Southside)	2021	—	Non-album singles
"Let Go" (featuring Jeon Woong of AB6IX)	2021	—	Non-album singles
"Don't Waste My Time"	2021	—	Non-album singles
"Highway"	2021	—	No.A
"True Colors"	2022	—	Non-album single
"It Ain't Over"	2022	—	No.A
"Paradise"	2022	—	No.A
"Burn"	2023	82	Primary Colors
"Between"	2023	99	Primary Colors
"YBOM (You've Been On My Mind)"	2024	—	Primary Colors
"Colors"	2024	—	Primary Colors
"Red Light"	2024	—	Primary Colors
"YBOM (Korean ver.)" (featuring Jiselle)	2024	—	Non-album single
"Christmas Lights"	2024	—	Non-album single
"Seasons"	2025	—	Non-album single
"Merry Go Round"	2025	—	Non-album single
"Just Say It"	2025	—	Non-album single
"—" denotes releases that did not chart or were not released in that region.

== Filmography ==
=== Television ===
Year	Title	Role	Network	Notes	Ref.
2022	I Will Be Your Bloom	Takumi Kurushima	TBS	Debut role, supporting role	
2026	Salvation, Swallowed by the Nest	Chiaki Hosho	MBS	Lead role	

=== Film ===
Year	Title	Role	Notes	Ref.
2025	My Love Story with Yamada-kun at Lv999	Eita Sasaki		
