= Arisa (manga) =

Japanese manga series

- Cover of the first volume as published by Kodansha (2009), depicting Tsubasa (right) and Arisa (left)

アリサ
- Genre: Mystery
- Manga
- Written by: Natsumi Ando
- Published by: Kodansha
- English publisher: NA: Del Rey (former); Kodansha USA (current)
- Magazine: Nakayoshi
- Original run: February 2009 – September 2012
- Volumes: 12

Arisa (Japanese: アリサ) is a Japanese mystery manga series written and illustrated by Natsumi Ando. It appeared as a serial in the monthly manga magazine Nakayoshi from the February 2009 issue to the September 2012 issue. Kodansha published the chapters in twelve bound volumes, from April 2009 to September 2012. Set in present-day Japan, it focuses on teenager Tsubasa Uehara, as she investigates the mystery surrounding her twin sister's suicide attempt. With her sister left comatose, Tsubasa poses as her in the hopes of uncovering the identity of the King, a person who grants wishes to Arisa's class, often resulting in violence.

Del Rey licensed the series for an English-language translation in North America. It published the first volume in October 2010, and shortly afterward, Kodansha USA took over publishing, with the final volume published in January 2014. The series was positively received by English-language readers, with three volumes placing on the New York Times Bestseller List for manga. Arisa generally received positive reviews from English-language reviewers, and the first volume placed on the Young Adult Library Services Association's list of "Great Graphic Novels for Teens" in 2011.

== Plot ==
Set in modern-day Japan, the plot centers on Tsubasa Uehara (上原 つばさ, Uehara Tsubasa) and Arisa Sonoda (園田 ありさ, Sonoda Arisa), beautiful twin sisters separated by their parents' divorce who keep in contact through letters. Finally meeting again as teenagers three years later, tomboyish Tsubasa is envious, but proud, of her popular sister, in comparison to her own school life where she is often referred to as the "Demon Princess." When Arisa receives a letter from her school denouncing her as a traitor, she attempts suicide and becomes comatose. Shocked and saddened, Tsubasa poses as her, attending her school to find out why she tried to kill herself. She learns that Arisa's class sends wishes on their cellphones to a person called "King" each Friday. The King only grants one wish weekly, resulting mostly in violence. Tsubasa resolves to stop the King and find out the person's identity to save Arisa, in the hopes of waking her from her coma.

Assisted in her investigations by Akira Manabe (真鍋 明良, Manabe Akira), Arisa's classmate who learns Tsubasa's identity, she encounters Mariko Takagi (高木 毬子, Takagi Mariko), Arisa's best friend whom the King manipulates; Midori Yamashita (山下 緑, Yamashita Midori), Arisa's boyfriend; Rei Kudō (玖堂 レイ, Kudō Rei), a transfer student whom Arisa had befriended online and who serves as the messenger of the King; and Shizuka Mochizuki (望月 静華, Mochizuki Shizuka), Manabe's childhood friend who lost the use of her legs after a suicide attempt provoked by the King. Arisa awakens from her coma, but pretends to have amnesia and returns to Midori's side. She reveals that she was the original King: although she granted harmless wishes in the beginning, she eventually stole the answers to an exam for Mariko's wish, fearing disappointment if she refused. Midori caught her in the act, and she shared the task of granting the class's wishes with him, until he injured her mother, in an attempt to grant her wish. Midori then replaced her as King, using violence and bullying to grant wishes. Horrified by his cruelty and the perceived similarities between them, she then reached out to her twin, hoping that Tsubasa would be able to uncover the truth. Tsubasa learns that Midori suffered psychological trauma in his childhood after being abandoned by his mother and witnessing his twin, Akari, die of neglect. She later foils his attempt to kill her mother, as he hated his own mother and believed that Arisa hated hers as well. Arisa confesses that she loves him for noticing her loneliness, and he realizes that he loves her too. In the conclusion, Arisa's mother spends more time with her, and Arisa reconciles with Tsubasa.

== Development ==
Manga artist Natsumi Ando's concept art of Arisa had two earlier models of Tsubasa with chin-length and shoulder-length hair, respectively. Ando initially felt worried about the absence of a potential romantic partner for Tsubasa, as Arisa's target audience is girls; however, as the manga progressed, she thought of it as "a selling point." As a result of this, she was able to focus on Tsubasa's emotions towards her twin. Soon after beginning the manga's serialization, Ando created "Tsubasa", a bonus chapter focusing on Arisa's pretending to be her elder sister; she continued to delay its publication, because it seemed inappropriate to have a bonus story with Arisa appear when she was comatose in the main storyline. According to Ando, it made a good chapter with which to conclude the series.

== Release ==
Written and illustrated by Natsumi Ando, the chapters of Arisa appeared as a serial in the monthly manga magazine Nakayoshi from the February 2009 issue to the September 2012 issue. Kodansha collected the chapters into twelve bound volumes, and published them from April 28, 2009, to September 6, 2012.

In 2009, Del Rey announced that it had licensed the series for an English-language translation in North America. Del Rey released the first volume on October 26, 2010; Kodansha USA continued publication of the series, with the final volume published on January 21, 2014. Digital editions of the series have also been published by Kodansha in the United Kingdom. Arisa has also been translated into German by Carlsen Comics.

== Reception ==
Arisa was positively received by English-language readers. The second, fifth, and sixth volumes each placed on the New York Times Bestseller List for manga.

Young Adult Library Services Association placed the first volume of Arisa on its list of "Great Graphic Novels for Teens" for 2011. About.com's Deb Aoki reviewed the first volume of Arisa positively, praising it as "compelling" and "a much darker tale" than Ando's previous work Kitchen Princess; she later placed Arisa on her 2010 list of the "Best New Manga" for the shōjo category. Otaku USA magazine's Danica Davidson agreed that the plot was darker than Kitchen Princess and described the artwork as "pretty and cutesy". According to Matthew Warner of Mania Entertainment, the initially clichéd-seeming characters and plain premise helped to provide a "strong contrast" to the main storyline and "the depraved and twisted nature of Arisa's class". While noting the presence of clichés and "plot holes", Carlo Santos of Anime News Network enjoyed the first volume, describing it as "a shoujo-styled Naoki Urasawa thriller, built upon layers of addictive mystery"; he had mixed feelings about her artwork, writing that it conveyed the plot well, but did not possess a distinct artistic style. In her review of the third volume, Rebecca Silverman, another reviewer for Anime News Network, wrote that while the middle-school setting felt believable and the mystery was intriguing, some aspects of the plot were trying on the reader's suspension of disbelief, and the artwork, though usually enjoyable, failed to be convincingly scary during frightening scenes. In her follow-up review of the eleventh and twelfth volumes, Silverman interpreted Arisa as struggling with Stockholm syndrome and wrote that it was unsettling, as by the conclusion, the character still remained in "an emotionally unhealthy (or even abusive) relationship." She enjoyed the suspense and wrote that Midori's backstory sufficed to explain his actions, concluding "Arisa has been a wild ride, an unexpected horror/mystery shoujo gem."
