= Delicious! =

35 part manga later published as a book

デリシャス!
- Manga
- Written by: Miyuki Kobayashi
- Illustrated by: Yui Ayumi
- Published by: Kodansha
- Magazine: Nakayoshi
- Original run: April 1996 – May 1999
- Volumes: 7

Delicious! (デリシャス!) is a manga drawn by artist Yui Ayumi (あゆみゆい, Ayumi Yui). The original story was created by Miyuki Kobayashi (小林深雪, Kobayashi Miyuki). It was serialized in 35 parts in the monthly shōjo publication Nakayoshi from April 1996 through May 1999. It was then collected into seven books, each containing five parts. Each part was published with a recipe for the reader to prepare.

== Story ==
Ringo Nonohara's dream is to become a star. Although she can't cook, she tries out for the lead in a cooking show called "Delicious Time," which will also be starring the star she idolizes, Mahito Ishizaka. When she discovers that the final stage of the competition will mean she has to prepare a dish, however, Ringo calls on her good friend, chef, and next-door-neighbor, Tsutsui Kazuomi. Thanks to Kazuomi's help and her own cute persona, she is chosen for "Delicious Time." Thus begin trials as Ringo tries to become a star.

== Characters ==
Ringo Nonohara (野々原りんご, Nonohara Ringo)
Ringo is the main female protagonist of Delicious! She is a huge fan of Mahito Ishizaka and is thrilled to be working with him. In the beginning she is clueless about Kazuomi's love for her, but over time she becomes more aware of it. Ringo is cute, energetic, and emotional. Her birthday is the October 10, and she likes manga, dance, and karaoke.
Kazuomi Tsutsui (筒井一臣, Tsutsui Kazuomi)
Kazuomi is the next-door neighbor and longtime friend to Ringo, whom he has a weak spot for. Because he is a good cook, he is often teaching her the recipes she uses on "Delicious Time!" His birthday is the April 4. He also plays basketball, which he remembers playing with his father.
Mahito Ishizaka (石坂真人, Ishizaka Mahito)
Mahito is a pop star who is host of "Delicious Time" with Ringo. He is influential in the choice of Ringo as host, since he will be co-starring. He grows affectionate of Ringo, and is depressed when he must quit "Delicious Time" and partner with Ayana.
Ayana Hanamori (花森朱菜, Hanamori Ayana)
Ayana is Ringo's rival. She is constantly trying to get attention, particularly from boys that have interest in Ringo. Eventually she has her own cooking show called "Sweet Cooking," which Mahito hosts with her.
Michiyo Matsuoka (松岡三千代, Matsuoka Michiyo)
Michiyo is a school friend of Ringo's.
Kaede Tsutsui (筒井楓, Tsutsui Kaede)
Kaede is the mother of Kazuomi and a widow, so she lives alone with her son. She is a screenplay writer and often struggles with her line of work. She eventually marries the director of "Delicious Time."
Ringo's father (野々原穂, Nonohara ???)
Although the kanji for Ringo's father's name is given in the manga, because he makes only occasional appearances and is only referred to as "Papa," the reading of his first name is uncertain. As a word in the Japanese language, however, the kanji is read "ho" and is a word for the ear or head of a plant. He is a static character who is supportive and caring for Ringo.
Ayame Nonohara (野々原あやめ, Nonohara Ayame)
Ayame is Ringo's mother. She is also a static character who is always energetic. She is sometimes found talking with Kaede, since Kaede is her next-door neighbor.
Hakusan Hanamori (花森白山, Hanamori Hakusan)
