= Naoki Kawano =

Japanese actor and musician (born 1982)

- Born: February 22, 1982 (age 44); Mobara, Chiba, Japan
- Occupations: Actor, musician
- Height: 171 cm (5 ft 7 in)

Naoki Kawano (川野 直輝, Kawano Naoki; born February 22, 1982) is a Japanese actor and musician from Mobara, Chiba Prefecture. He is a former Johnny's Jr. member and is no longer represented by Johnny & Associates. While a Johnny's Jr., he was part of Kaidan Trio, TOKYO, and Kawano Band. He was also formerly the drummer of the rock band Dustz, fronted by fellow actor Ray Fujita. His debut role as an actor was as the antagonist Long in the Super Sentai series Juken Sentai Gekiranger.

== Filmography ==
- The little girl in me (2012)
- 125 Years Memory (2015)
- Flower and Snake: Zero (2014)
