= Kokoro Aoshima =

Japanese actress and model (born 1999)

- Born: May 19, 1999 (age 27); Shizuoka Prefecture, Japan
- Occupations: Actress; model
- Years active: 2014–present
- Agent: Toho Entertainment
- Modeling information
- Height: 165 cm (5 ft 5 in)
- Hair color: black
- Eye color: brown

Japanese name
- Kanji: 青島 心
- Hiragana: あおしま こころ
Transcriptions
- Romanization: Aoshima Kokoro

Kokoro Aoshima (青島 心(あおしま こころ), Aoshima Kokoro; born May 19, 1999) is a Japanese actress and model. Her most notable roles to date are Zero: Dragon Blood as Alice Hiromi as well as a recurring role in the Kamen Rider Geats series as Tsumuri.

== Career ==
In 2011, Aoshima's mother had applied her for the "7th Toho Cinderella Audition" without her knowledge, and despite not winning, she was still contacted by the agency and was signed with Toho Entertainment. One of the victors from the same competition was actress Minami Hamabe.

She was cast as the heroine in the television drama Zero: Dragon Blood, which began airing on January 6, 2017. This series marked her first drama appearance.

In the January 23, 2017, issue of the weekly magazine Weekly Playboy by Shueisha, she was featured as one of the eight must watch people of 2017, known as the "Sugokawa 2017".

In 2022, Aoshima appeared in the special effects television drama Kamen Rider Geats as Tsumuri.

== Filmography ==
=== Film ===
Year	Title	Role	Notes	Ref(s)
2014	Kiki's Delivery Service	Cameo		
2018	After School Chronicles	Cameo		
2020	Keep Your Hands Off Eizouken!	Cameo		
2022	Dry Bowl	Sumire Matsumura		
2022	Kamen Rider Geats × Revice: Movie Battle Royale	Tsumuri		
2023	Kamen Rider Geats the Movie: 4 Aces and the Black Fox	Tsumuri		
2023	Kamen Rider the Winter Movie: Gotchard & Geats Strongest Chemy ★ Gotcha Great Operation	Tsumuri		
2024	The Yin Yang Master Zero	Palace lady		
2025	Suicide Notes Laid on the Table	Ami Kinukake		
2026	Gemnibus vol.2	TBA		
2026	Agito: Psychic War	Shibukawa		
2026	I Tried Returning to Fukuyama City	Maika Sugimoto		
2027	Leviathan	Rin Togawa		

=== Television ===
Year	Title	Role	Notes	Ref(s)
2017	Zero: Dragon Blood	Alice Hiromi	Lead role	
2020	Younger Boyfriends	Cameo	Episode 2	
2020	Something's Wrong with Us	Saori Hase		
2021	Great Literary Boy!: Johnny's Jr. Deciphers Masterpieces		Episode 10	
2021	Unlucky Girl!	Hitomi	Episode 2	
2021	Gundam Build Real	Saori Ishiwata	Web series; episode 3	
2022	Dr. White	Nurse	Episode 3	
2022	I Want to Hold Aono-kun so Badly I Could Die	Cameo		
2022	Kamen Rider Geats	Tsumuri		
2023	Dr. Chocolate	Erika Hayama	Episode 6	
2023	Kamen Rider Punk Jack	Tsurumi	Web series	
2023	Emergency Special: Taken Out of Storage! Desire Grand Prix Special	Tsurumi	Web series	
2024	Kamen Rider Gazer	Tsurumi	Web series	
2024	Kamen Rider Outsiders	Tsurumi	Web series; episodes 5 and 7	
2024	Celebrity Boys Are Out of Control	Ayaka	Episode 7	
2024	Quruli: Who Fell in Love with Me?	Tanaka		
2024	Re Start: When a Fool Embraces Ambition	Serina Mori	Lead role; web series	
2024	Ninja Sentai Kakuranger Part 3: Middle-Aged Struggle	Snow / Yukionna	Web series	
2025	AIBOU: Tokyo Detective Duo	Touko Kiriyama	Season 23; episode 10	
2025	Then You Try Making It!	Mari Nagasaka		
2025	Less Than a Stranger; Dear, I Disliked You		Lead role	
2026	Salvation, Swallowed by the Nest	Rin		

== Awards nominations ==
Year presented, name of the award ceremony, category, nominee(s) of the award, and the result of the nomination
Year	Award ceremony	Category	Nominated work(s)	Result	Ref.
2011	7th Toho Cinderella Audition	Finalist	Herself	Honored	

== Bibliography ==
=== Magazine ===
- Pichi Lemon (July 2015 issue–December 2015 issue, Gakken Plus ) – Exclusive model
- Love Berry (January 2016–July 2017, Tokuma Shoten ) – Model
