= Something's Wrong with Us =

Japanese manga series

- First tankōbon volume cover

私たちはどうかしている (Watashitachi wa Dōka Shiteiru)
- Genre: Murder mystery; Romance; Thriller
- Manga
- Written by: Natsumi Ando
- Published by: Kodansha
- English publisher: NA: Kodansha USA
- Imprint: Be Love KC
- Magazine: Be Love
- Original run: December 1, 2016 – present
- Volumes: 24
- Series titles
- 1. Something's Wrong with Us (2016–2021, 16 volumes); 2. Something's Wrong with Us: Newlywed Arc (2021–2023, 3 volumes); 3. Something's Wrong with Us: Longing for My Wife (2024–present, 5 volumes)
- Television drama
- Directed by: Naoko Komuro; Ryuichi Inomata; Hiroto Akashi; Itaru Mizuno
- Produced by: Norihiko Nishi
- Written by: Rin Eto
- Music by: Yoshiaki Dewa
- Original network: Nippon TV
- Original run: August 12, 2020 – September 30, 2020
- Episodes: 8
- icon

Something's Wrong with Us (Japanese: 私たちはどうかしている, Hepburn: Watashitachi wa Dōka Shiteiru) is a Japanese manga series written and illustrated by Natsumi Ando. It was serialized in Kodansha's josei manga magazine Be Love from December 2016 to July 2021. A sequel, Something's Wrong with Us: Newlywed Arc, was serialized in the same magazine from December 2021 to February 2023. A third series, Something's Wrong with Us: Longing for My Wife, started in July 2024. The overall series' chapters have been collected in 22 tankōbon volumes as of October 2025. An eight-episode television drama adaptation, starring Minami Hamabe and Ryusei Yokohama, was broadcast on Nippon TV from August to September 2020. By September 2021, the manga had over 5 million copies in circulation.

== Plot ==
Nao Hanaoka (花岡 七桜, Hanaoka Nao) is a young woman who specializes in making wagashi, traditional Japanese sweets. As a child, Nao lived with her mother at the confectionery shop Kogetsuan. There, she befriended the owner's son, Tsubaki Takatsuki (高月 椿, Takatsuki Tsubaki). However, their friendship ended when Tsubaki's father was murdered and Tsubaki accused Nao's mother of the crime. As a result, Nao's mother was arrested, and Nao's life changed forever. Fifteen years later, Nao and Tsubaki meet again unexpectedly, but he does not recognize her because she has changed her name and appearance. Impressed by Nao's confectionery skills, Tsubaki proposes marriage, which she accepts while secretly planning to uncover the truth about his father's murder and clear her mother's name. When Nao returns to Kogetsuan, she is surrounded by secrets and unexpected events. Her complicated relationship with Tsubaki evolves, making it challenging for her to distinguish her feelings from her desire to uncover the truth.

== Media ==
=== Manga ===
Written and illustrated by Natsumi Ando, Something's Wrong with Us was serialized in Kodansha's josei manga magazine Be Love from December 1, 2016, to July 30, 2021. Kodansha collected its chapters in 16 tankōbon volumes, released from April 13, 2017, to September 13, 2021.

A second series, titled Something's Wrong with Us: Newlywed Arc (私たちはどうかしている 新婚編, Watashitachi wa Dōka Shiteiru: Shinkon-hen), was serialized in the same magazine from December 1, 2021, to February 1, 2023. Its chapters were collected in three tankōbon volumes, released from May 13, 2022, to February 13, 2023.

A third series, titled Something's Wrong with Us: Longing for My Wife (私たちはどうかしている 妻恋い, Watashi-tachi wa Dōka Shiteiru: Tsuma Koi), began serialization on July 1, 2024. Its first tankōbon volume was released on December 13, 2024. As of August 12, 2026, five volumes have been released.

In North America, the manga has been licensed for English release by Kodansha USA.

==== Volumes ====
No.	Original release date	Original ISBN	English release date	English ISBN
1	April 13, 2017	978-4-06-394538-6	March 17, 2020	978-1-63236-972-7
2	June 13, 2017	978-4-06-394548-5	July 21, 2020	978-1-63236-973-4
3	September 13, 2017	978-4-06-394555-3	October 13, 2020	978-1-64651-004-7
4	December 13, 2017	978-4-06-510622-8	December 8, 2020	978-1-64651-067-2
5	March 13, 2018	978-4-06-511085-0	February 9, 2021	978-1-64651-068-9
6	June 13, 2018	978-4-06-511720-0	May 18, 2021	978-1-64651-069-6
7	September 13, 2018	978-4-06-512892-3	March 29, 2022	978-1-64651-095-5
8	December 13, 2018	978-4-06-514042-0	April 26, 2022	978-1-64651-096-2
9	April 12, 2019	978-4-06-515093-1	July 12, 2022	978-1-64651-097-9
10	August 9, 2019	978-4-06-516702-1	August 30, 2022	978-1-64651-277-5
11	December 13, 2019	978-4-06-517936-9	November 8, 2022	978-1-64651-356-7
12	April 13, 2020	978-4-06-519061-6	December 20, 2022	978-1-64651-413-7
13	August 12, 2020	978-4-06-520238-8	February 28, 2023	978-1-64651-414-4
14	December 11, 2020	978-4-06-521735-1	April 18, 2023	978-1-64651-450-2
15	May 13, 2021	978-4-06-523243-9	June 20, 2023	978-1-64651-473-1
16	September 13, 2021	978-4-06-524772-3	August 22, 2023	978-1-64651-796-1
Newlywed Arc
17	May 13, 2022	978-4-06-527702-7	October 24, 2023	978-1-64651-797-8
18	January 13, 2023	978-4-06-530364-1	December 24, 2023	978-1-64651-925-5
19	February 13, 2023	978-4-06-530590-4	February 27, 2024	979-8-88877-006-1
Longing for My Wife
20	December 13, 2024	978-4-06-537828-1	—	—
21	May 13, 2025	978-4-06-530590-4	—	—
22	October 10, 2025	978-4-06-541199-5	—	—
23	March 13, 2026	978-4-06-542900-6	—	—
24	August 12, 2026	978-4-06-544531-0	—	—

=== Drama ===
An eight-episode television drama adaptation, starring Minami Hamabe as Nao Hanaoka and Ryusei Yokohama as Tsubaki Takatsuki, was broadcast on Nippon TV from August 12 to September 30, 2020.

== Reception ==
By March 2020, the manga had over 2 million copies in circulation; and over 5 million copies in circulation by September 2021.

The series ranked 33rd on the 2021 "Book of the Year" list from Media Factory's Da Vinci magazine.
