= Nordi =

Nordi is both a surname and a given name. Notable people with the name include:

- Cleo Nordi (1898–1983), Russo-Finnish ballerina
- Emanuele Nordi (born 1984), Italian footballer
- Nordi Mukiele (born 1997), French footballer
