= Dustz =

Japanese rock band

- Years active: 2006–present
- Labels: Be On Key Records (2006-2009); Epic Records Japan (2009-present)
- Members: Ray; Gus; Kohei hello
- Past members: NZM; 80; Naoki; KenT
- Website: dustz.net

Dustz (currently stylized as DUSTZ) is a Japanese rock band fronted by French-Japanese actor Ray Fujita. Formed by Fujita and two of his classmates from the Lycée franco-japonais de Tokyo, the group has gained national renown by performing theme songs to various shows, including Sengoku Basara: Samurai Kings, Blood-C. and most recently Zero: Black Blood.

Dustz's first album Trois was released by Epic Records Japan on December 14, 2011. Its deluxe edition was released in Digipak form with a DVD of Dustz's music videos.

== Members ==
- Ray (Ray Fujita (藤田 玲, Fujita Rei, went by "Takuto" during indie releases)): Vocals
- Gus (Austin Tomoya Kōrogi (興梠 オースティン朋哉, Kōrogi Ōsutin Tomoya)): Bass
- Kohei (Kohei Ebata (江畑コーヘー, Ebata Kohē)): Guitar
- Koji Shiouchi: DJ

=== Former members ===
- NZM (Nozomu Kawai (若井 望, Kawai Nozomu, RUSHMORE)): Guitar
- 80 (Etienne): Guitar
- Naoki (Naoki Kawano (川野 直輝, Kawano Naoki)): Drums
- KenT (Michel Chihiro Yokoyama (横山 ミッシェル千寛, Yokoyama Missheru Chihiro)): Guitar

== Discography ==
=== Albums ===
- Trois - December 14, 2011

=== Singles ===
Indies
No label

- "Pain" - October 2006
- "Never Again" - January 2007
- "L&P Compilation CD" - March 9, 2007
- "World" - March 9, 2007

Indies
Be On Key Records

- "Future" - March 26, 2008
- "Lapis lazuli" - February 14, 2009

Major
Epic Records Japan

- "Break & Peace" - May 27, 2009
  - Sengoku Basara: Samurai Kings ending theme
- "Brilliant Day" - October 7, 2009
  - Oretachi wa Tenshi da! NO ANGEL NO LUCK insert song
- "Criez" - April 6, 2011
- "spiral" - August 31, 2011
  - Blood-C opening theme

Major
DolceStar Records

- "S#0(Scene Number Zero)" - March 8, 2014
  - Zero: Black Blood ending theme
