= Natsumi Ando =

Japanese manga artist

- 安藤 なつみ
- Born: Tenpaku Ward, Nagoya
- Occupation: Manga artist
- Known for: Zodiac P.I. Kitchen Princess; Something's Wrong with Us
- Website: blog.goo.ne.jp/miyasayo0127

Natsumi Ando (安藤 なつみ, Andō Natsumi) is a Japanese manga artist. She debuted in 1994 with Headstrong Cinderella, which won the 19th Nakayoshi Rookie Award. She is best known for Zodiac P.I., Something's Wrong with Us, and Kitchen Princess, the latter for which she won the Kodansha Manga Award for children's manga in 2006. Something's Wrong with Us received a live-action Japanese television drama adaptation that premiered on Nippon TV on August 12, 2020, starring Minami Hamabe and Ryusei Yokohama.

== Works ==
- Tsuiteru ne Hijiri-chan (ツイてる ね 聖ちゃん)(April–November 1998, Nakayoshi, Kodansha, 1 volume)
- Smile de Ikō (スマイル で いこう) (February 1999–?, Nakayoshi, Kodansha, 2 volumes)
- Maria-ppoino! (マリアっぽいの) (2000)
- Zodiac P.I. (十二宮でつかまえて, Jūnikyū de Tsukamaete) (April 2001–January 2003, Nakayoshi, Kodansha, 4 volumes; English translation, 2003)
- Tamete Misema Show! (貯めて みせま ショウ!) (2003)
- Wild @ Heart (ワイルド だもん, Wairudo Damon) (April 2003–May 2004, Nakayoshi, Kodansha, 3 volumes; English translation, 2010)
- Kitchen Princess (キッチンのお姫さま, Kitchen no Ohime-sama) (September 2004—October 2008, Nakayoshi, Kodansha, 10 volumes; English translation, 2007)
- Arisa (ARISA<アリサ>) (February 2009—September 2012, Nakayoshi, Kodansha, 12 volumes; English translation, 2010)
- Let's Dance a Waltz (ワルツのお時間, Waltz no Ojikan; lit. 'Time for a Waltz') (February 2013–February 2014, Nakayoshi, Kodansha, 3 volumes; English translation, 2015)
- "The World in Your Palm" (Tsunagaru ~Te no Hira no Sekai~) (April 2014, Nakayoshi, oneshot)
- (ハイジと山男)(February 2015–ongoing, BE LOVE, Kodansha, 3 volumes)
- Something's Wrong with Us (私たちはどうかしている, Watashitachi wa Dōka Shiteiru)(December 2016-July 2021, Kodansha, 16 volumes; English translation, 2020)
