= Miyuki Kobayashi (writer) =

Japanese novelist and writer for manga

Miyuki Kobayashi (小林深雪, Kobayashi Miyuki; born 10 March in Saitama Prefecture) is a Japanese novelist and scenario writer for manga. She graduated from Musashino Art University. She wrote the scenarios for Delicious! and Kitchen Princess. In 2006, she won the Kodansha Manga Award in the children's manga category for Kitchen Princess.
