= List of Haruhi Suzumiya chapters =

The Melancholy of Haruhi Suzumiya second manga adaptation volume 1 cover

Several manga series have been developed based on the Haruhi Suzumiya light novels written by Nagaru Tanigawa and illustrated by Noizi Ito.

The first one, by Makoto Mizuno, ran from May to December 2004 issues of Shōnen Ace and was partially compiled in one volume published in August 2004. It was considerably different from the light novels in its one published volume, having little input from the original author.

The second series, illustrated by Gaku Tsugano, ran from November 2005 to November 2013 issues, with a younger target audience than the original novels. On April 17, 2008, Yen Press announced that they had acquired the license for the North American release of the first four volumes of the second manga series, promising the manga would not be censored.

The third adaptation, was an official parody four-panel comic strip titled The Melancholy of Suzumiya Haruhi-chan by Puyo started serialization in Shōnen Ace on July 26, 2007, and in The Sneaker on August 30, 2007. Yen Press licensed the Haruhi-chan manga series for an English release in North America and released the first volume on October 26, 2010.

Another manga, The Disappearance of Nagato Yuki-chan (長門有希ちゃんの消失, Nagato Yuki-chan no Shōshitsu), also by Puyo, was serialized in Kadokawa Shoten's Young Ace between July 2009 and August 2016. It is set in the alternate timeline established in the fourth light novel, The Disappearance of Haruhi Suzumiya, where Yuki Nagato is a shy schoolgirl as opposed to an alien. The series has also been licensed in North America by Yen Press.

A dōjinshi of note is the four-panel parody manga Nyorōn Churuya-san by Eretto (Utsura Uraraka). Starring a super deformed, smoked cheese-loving version of Tsuruya this manga was published in three volumes (released in August 2006, February 2007, and October 2007) before beginning serialization in the magazine Comp Ace in November 2008.

== Volume list ==
=== Makoto Mizuno series ===
A Haruhi Suzumiya manga series was illustrated by Makoto Mizuno.

No.	Japanese release date	Japanese ISBN
1	August 27, 2004	978-4-04-713658-8
01. "Suzumiya Haruhi and the SOS Dan enliven the World!"; 02. "Welcome to Nagato's World"; 03. "A Trip through the City"; 04. "Bamboo Leaf Rhapsody"; 05. "Let's play baseball!"
Chapter 1 tells the story of how Kyon inspired Haruhi to create the SOS Brigade. Chapter 2 is about Nagato telling Kyon about her true identity and Haruhi getting a computer for the Brigade. Chapter 3 is about Kyon going with Mikuru to the city to look for strange beings, and Mikuru tells him her true identity and that Haruhi can destroy the world. Chapter 4 is about Kyon going back in time to meet a younger Haruhi, and motivating her to come to North High. Chapter 5 is about the Brigade playing baseball.

=== Gaku Tsugano series ===
A Haruhi Suzumiya manga series was illustrated by Gaku Tsugano.

No.	Original release date	Original ISBN	English release date	English ISBN
1	April 21, 2006	978-4-04713-811-7	October 28, 2008	978-0-75952-944-1
01. "The Melancholy of Haruhi Suzumiya I"; 02. "The Melancholy of Haruhi Suzumiya II"; 03. "The Melancholy of Haruhi Suzumiya III"; 04. "The Melancholy of Haruhi Suzumiya IV"; 05. "The Melancholy of Haruhi Suzumiya V"
A high school freshman known only as Kyon encounters a strange individual named Haruhi Suzumiya. Somewhat influenced by Kyon, Haruhi sets up the SOS Brigade, recruiting Yuki Nagato. Kyon learns from Yuki that she is an alien in charge of monitoring Haruhi, who has god-like abilities to subconsciously affect the world. Another alien in Kyon's class, Ryoko Asakura, attempts to kill him to try to get a reaction from Haruhi, but Yuki stops her. Haruhi recruits Mikuru Asahina, using her to blackmail a computer out of the computer club. A transfer student named Itsuki Koizumi joins the club. Mikuru reveals to Kyon that she is a time traveller sent to monitor Haruhi. Itsuki reveals himself to be an esper who reveres Haruhi as a god.
2	June 22, 2006	978-404713-831-5	March 24, 2009	978-075952-945-8
06. "The Melancholy of Haruhi Suzumiya VI"; 07. "The Melancholy of Haruhi Suzumiya VII"; 08. "The Melancholy of Haruhi Suzumiya VIII"; 09. "The Melancholy of Haruhi Suzumiya IX"
Kyon meets an older Mikuru, who gives him some advice concerning a future dilemma. Later, Itsuki takes Kyon to a closed space, a realm subconsciously created by Haruhi, where he fights a large blue giant. As Haruhi becomes increasingly bored, she pulls Kyon and herself inside one of these closed spaces. Using advice he received from Yuki and the elder Mikuru, Kyon breaks free from the closed space by kissing Haruhi.
3	December 21, 2006	978-404713-885-8	June 9, 2009	978-075952-946-5
10. "The Boredom of Haruhi Suzumiya I"; 11. "The Boredom of Haruhi Suzumiya II"; 12. "Knowing Me, Knowing You"; 13. "Bamboo Leaf Rhapsody I"; 14. "Bamboo Leaf Rhapsody II"
In "The Boredom of Haruhi Suzumiya", Haruhi enters the SOS Brigade into a baseball tournament. Yuki uses her powers to win the opening game and prevent Haruhi from destroying the world. In the manga-only story "Knowing Me, Knowing You", Mikuru invites Kyon to go shopping with her whilst trying to keep it a secret from Haruhi. In "Bamboo Leaf Rhapsody", on Tanabata, Mikuru takes Kyon three years into the past where he helps a young Haruhi draw weird lines inside a schoolyard, influencing her desire to seek out aliens, time travellers and espers.
4	June 22, 2007	978-404713-923-7	October 27, 2009	978-075952-947-2
15. "Mysterique Sign I"; 16. "Mysterique Sign II"; 17. "Mysterique Sign Returns"; 18. "Remote Island Syndrome I"; 19. "Remote Island Syndrome II"
In "Mysterique Sign", the SOS Brigade are tasked with seeking out the computer club president, who has gone missing due to a weird symbol on the SOS Brigade website. In the manga-exclusive "Mysterique Sign Returns", the SOS Brigade pursues its follow-up investigation of other people who viewed the symbol on the website, one of whom is Kyon's grandfather. In "Remote Island Syndrome", the SOS Brigade vacations at a mansion on a remote island, and are thrust into a murder mystery when they find their host with a knife in his chest.
5	October 24, 2007	978-404713-981-7	March 23, 2010	978-031608-605-9
20. "Endless Eight I"; 21. "Endless Eight II"; 22. "A Perspective on Life from Shamisen the Stray"; 23. "Get in the Ring"; 24. "The Sigh of Haruhi Suzumiya I"; 25. "The Sigh of Haruhi Suzumiya II"
As an activity-packed summer incites a lot of deja-vu within Kyon, he learns that they have been repeating the last two weeks of summer thousands of times due to Haruhi's desire to not let summer end without doing everything she wants. In the manga-only story "A Perspective on Life from Shamisen the Stray", set between scenes of "Endless Eight", Shamisen makes observances on humans. Another manga-only story, "Get in the Ring", is a fuller account of the school sports festival shown briefly in the light novel and anime versions of The Sigh of Haruhi Suzumiya. Haruhi's powers cause the teams to keep switching places, leaving the SOS Brigade to try and figure out what she desires. In "The Sigh of Haruhi Suzumiya", as the cultural festival approaches, Haruhi decides to make her own film.
6	May 22, 2008	978-404715-061-4	June 15, 2010	978-031608-952-4
26. "The Sigh of Haruhi Suzumiya III"; 27. "The Sigh of Haruhi Suzumiya IV"; 28. "The Sigh of Haruhi Suzumiya V"; 29. "Show Must Go On"; 30. "Live a Live"; 31. "Tales from the Thousand Lakes"
As production on the SOS Brigade's movie continues, Haruhi's desire for amazing effects causes lasers and other bizarre effects to come into reality. Furthermore, Haruhi's shabby treatment of Mikuru enrages Kyon to the point that he almost hits her. In a diversion from the light novel and anime versions, rather than make up with Haruhi after their fight, Kyon goads her into continuing with the movie by hijacking the school's broadcast room and running a preview of the movie. Kyon puts a stop to the crazy phenomenon by having Haruhi add a disclaimer that the movie is a work of fiction. In the manga-only story "Show Must Go On", Kyon's sister sneaks into the cultural festival, and she and Kyon end up performing in the play put on by Koizumi's class. In "Live a Live", the movie is shown at the cultural festival, and Haruhi acts as a stand-in for a band's performance. In another manga exclusive, "Tales from the Thousand Lakes", the SOS Brigade takes a trip to a pair of lakes and rent priestess costumes for the girls. They are mistaken for real priestesses by a young girl, who enlists their help in finding her missing brother.
7	December 20, 2008	978-404715-148-2	October 26, 2010	978-031608-953-1
32. "The Day of Sagittarius I"; 33. "The Day of Sagittarius II"; 34. "The Day of Sagittarius Aftermath"; 35. "The Disappearance of Haruhi Suzumiya I"; 36. "The Disappearance of Haruhi Suzumiya II"; 37. "The Disappearance of Haruhi Suzumiya III"
In "The Day of Sagittaruis", in an attempt to recover their stolen equipment, the Computer Research Society challenges the SOS Brigade to a space battle simulation game. The SOS Brigade start off at an advantage due to both their inexperience and the computer club's cheating, but with Nagato's help they win. In the manga-exclusive sequel, "The Day of Sagittarius Aftermath", the Computer Research Society takes advantage of Haruhi's permission to let Nagato spend time with their group by attempting to make both Nagato and Asahina permanent members. In "The Disappearance of Haruhi Suzumiya", Kyon wakes up to find his whole world has changed. Haruhi and Koizumi are missing, Asakura has returned, Asahina and Tsuruya have no memory of him, and Nagato is a normal, shy human being.
8	March 24, 2009	978-404715-208-3	March 29, 2011	978-031608-954-8
38. "The Disappearance of Haruhi Suzumiya IV"; 39. "The Disappearance of Haruhi Suzumiya V"; 40. "The Disappearance of Haruhi Suzumiya VI"; 41. "The Disappearance of Haruhi Suzumiya VII"; 42. "Parallel Sidestory I: A Sudden Cinderella Story"; 43. "Parallel Sidestory II: Mikurion Dollar Baby"
Kyon finds a message from the original Nagato, telling him to gather a set of keys. As he starts to get used to the new world, getting to know the new Nagato, he learns from Taniguchi that Haruhi has been at a different school the entire time. By introducing himself as "John Smith", the alias he used when he travelled back in time to assist the young Haruhi, Kyon gets Haruhi to believe his story. She gathers all the members of the SOS Brigade in the classroom, providing the keys necessary to activate the program from Nagato, offering him a way to fix things. The manga-only "Parallel Sidestory" series is a collection of one-shot stories set in alternate universes in which the SOS Brigade members are all adults. In "A Sudden Cinderella Story", the members of the SOS Brigade comprise SO3 Studio, a struggling talent agency. In "Mikurion Dollar Baby", Asahina is a rising boxer and Haruhi is her manager.
9	July 22, 2009	978-404715-269-4	August 16, 2011	978-031618-321-5
44. "The Disappearance of Haruhi Suzumiya VIII"; 45. "The Disappearance of Haruhi Suzumiya IX"; 46. "The Disappearance of Haruhi Suzumiya X"; 47. "The Disappearance of Haruhi Suzumiya XI"; 48. "The Disappearance of Haruhi Suzumiya: Epilogue"; 49. "Parallel Sidestory III: Message From Meiji 38, All Clear Out Here"
Travelling back to the Tanabata of three years ago, Kyon teams up with adult Asahina and goes to see Nagato. Nagato explains that, after accumulating a lot of stress over the years, she stole Haruhi's powers and used them to eliminate everything paranormal from the world. Receiving an antidote to reverse the effects of Nagato's alteration, Kyon returns to the point when everything changed. He is stabbed by Asakura but is rescued by future counterparts of Nagato, Asahina, and himself. Returning to his normal timeline, Kyon assures Nagato that if the Data Overmind does anything to harm her, he will reveal his hidden alias to Haruhi and use her powers to stop them. The manga-only story "The Disappearance of Haruhi Suzumiya: Epilogue" accounts an alternate version of the Christmas party which is seen in "Snowy Mountain Syndrome" in the light novels. In "Message From Meiji 38, All Clear Out Here", the members of the SOS Brigade are wandering travelers living near the end of the Meiji era, searching for "fifth dimensional tea".
10	October 22, 2009	978-404715-302-8	November 22, 2011	978-031618-639-1
50. "Lover at First Sight I"; 51. "Lover at First Sight II"; 52. "Lover at First Sight III"; 53. "Snowy Mountain Syndrome I"; 54. "Snowy Mountain Syndrome II"
In "Lover at First Sight" (an adaptation of "Love at First Sight" from the light novels), Kyon receives a phone call from his middle school classmate, Nakagawa, who has feelings for Nagato and asks Kyon to hook them up. In "Snowy Mountain Syndrome", the SOS Brigade go on a ski trip to celebrate New Year's, but find themselves caught in a snowstorm. They take shelter in a strange mansion where the very concept of time is distorted. Furthermore, they learn Nagato has been disconnected from the Data Overmind.
11	April 21, 2010	978-404715-429-2	February 28, 2012	978-031619-576-8
55. "Snowy Mountain Syndrome III"; 56. "Snowy Mountain Syndrome IV"; 57. "Where Did the Cat Go? I"; 58. "Where Did the Cat Go? II"; 59. "Red Data Elegy"
Kyon is approached by a lustful Asahina, who turns out to be a fake. After discovering the others had similar visions, Nagato comes down with a fever. Kyon and Koizumi discover a strange door complete with a puzzle. With help from Nagato, Kyon and Koizumi solve the puzzle and return to reality. In "Where Did the Cat Go?", Koizumi holds another murder mystery. In the manga-only story "Red Data Elegy", the SOS Brigade's winter vacation continues with an encounter with a mysterious wolf.
12	October 22, 2010	978-404715-544-2	May 29, 2012	978-031620-946-5
60. "The Disappearance of Haruhi Suzumiya ~Another Day~"; 61. "The Melancholy of Mikuru Asahina I"; 62. "The Melancholy of Mikuru Asahina II"; 63. "Editor in Chief ☆ Full Speed Ahead! I"; 64. "Editor in Chief ☆ Full Speed Ahead! II"
In "The Disappearance of Haruhi Suzumiya ~Another Day~", an adaptation of the prologue chapter of The Intrigues of Haruhi Suzumiya, Kyon assembles Asahina and Nagato and travels back in time in order to rescue himself from Asakura and put the timeline back on track. In "The Melancholy of Mikuru Asahina", Mikuru asks Kyon to help her buy some tea leaves, but it turns out to be part of a time travel mission. In "Editor in Chief ☆ Full Speed Ahead!", the new student council president threatens to disband the SOS Brigade, so the members must produce a collection of literature. Haruhi declares herself the publication's editor and threatens to reject any submissions that aren't good.
13	February 23, 2011	978-404715-656-2	August 21, 2012	978-031620-949-6
65. "Editor in Chief ☆ Full Speed Ahead! III"; 66. "Editor in Chief ☆ Full Speed Ahead! IV"; 67. "Editor in Chief ☆ Full Speed Ahead! V"; 68. "Welcome to the House of Terror"; 69. "The Intrigues of Haruhi Suzumiya I"
Haruhi assigns Nagato a horror story, Asahina a fairy tale, Koizumi a mystery, and Kyon a love story, and solicits contributions from numerous other students. Koizumi realizes that Haruhi intended that Kyon get the love story so she could learn about his romantic history, since his lack of imagination would force him to write about his own experiences. He writes a pseudo love story about the time he took one of his little sister's friends, Miyokichi, to see an adult movie that she couldn't get into on her own. Haruhi's soliciting contributions acts as unintentional advertising for the publication, causing it to promptly "sell out". In the manga-only story "Welcome to the House of Terror", set near the end of "Editor in Chief ☆ Full Speed Ahead!", Haruhi, Kyon, and Taniguchi are working on the literary publication at Kyon's house when Miyokichi asks them to go with her to an abandoned house where a family was supposedly murdered. In "The Intrigues of Haruhi Suzumiya", Kyon is concerned when Haruhi becomes unusually subdued. He encounters a more immediate crisis when he finds a second Asahina hiding in the broom closet.
14	May 24, 2011	978-404715-698-2	December 11, 2012	978-031622-905-0
70. "The Intrigues of Haruhi Suzumiya II"; 71. "The Intrigues of Haruhi Suzumiya III"; 72. "The Intrigues of Haruhi Suzumiya IV"; 73. "The Intrigues of Haruhi Suzumiya V"; 74. "The Intrigues of Haruhi Suzumiya VI"
15	December 21, 2011	978-404715-804-7	April 23, 2013	978-031623-230-2
75. "The Intrigues of Haruhi Suzumiya VII"; 76. "The Intrigues of Haruhi Suzumiya VIII"; 77. "The Intrigues of Haruhi Suzumiya IX"; 78. "The Intrigues of Haruhi Suzumiya X"; 79. "The Intrigues of Haruhi Suzumiya XI"
16	March 17, 2012	978-404120-185-5	October 29, 2013	978-031623-236-4
80. "Wandering Shadow I"; 81. "Wandering Shadow II"; 82. "Wandering Shadow III"; 83. "The Dissociation of Haruhi Suzumiya I"; 84. "The Dissociation of Haruhi Suzumiya II"
17	November 21, 2012	978-404120-459-7	December 17, 2013	978-0-316-32234-8
85. "The Dissociation of Haruhi Suzumiya III"; 86. "The Dissociation of Haruhi Suzumiya IV"; 87. "The Dissociation of Haruhi Suzumiya V"; 88. "The Dissociation of Haruhi Suzumiya VI"; 89. "The Surprise of Haruhi Suzumiya I"
18	March 19, 2013	978-404120-644-7	May 27, 2014	978-031628-678-7
90. "The Surprise of Haruhi Suzumiya II"; 91. "The Surprise of Haruhi Suzumiya III"; 92. "The Surprise of Haruhi Suzumiya IV"; 93. "The Surprise of Haruhi Suzumiya V"; 94. "The Surprise of Haruhi Suzumiya VI"
19	June 21, 2013	978-404120-741-3	August 26, 2014	978-031637-680-8
95. "The Surprise of Haruhi Suzumiya VII"; 96. "The Surprise of Haruhi Suzumiya VIII"; 97. "The Surprise of Haruhi Suzumiya IX"; 98. "The Surprise of Haruhi Suzumiya X"; 99. "The Surprise of Haruhi Suzumiya XI"
20	December 26, 2013	978-404120-956-1	November 18, 2014	978-031633-646-8
100. "The Surprise of Haruhi Suzumiya XII"; 101. "The Surprise of Haruhi Suzumiya XIII"; 102. "The Surprise of Haruhi Suzumiya XIV"; 103. "The Surprise of Haruhi Suzumiya XV"; 104. "The Surprise of Haruhi Suzumiya XVI"; 105. "Rainy Day"

=== The Melancholy of Suzumiya Haruhi-chan ===
The Melancholy of Suzumiya Haruhi-chan is an official gag manga series written and illustrated by Puyo in which the cast are depicted in chibi forms.

No.	Original release date	Original ISBN	English release date	English ISBN
1	May 26, 2008	978-404715-062-1	October 26, 2010	978-031608-957-9
"The SOS Brigade Takes the Stage" (SOS団初登場の回, SOS-dan Hatsutōjō no Kai); "Nagato Becomes an Otaku" (長門がオタクな回, Nagato ga Otaku na Kai); "Capturing Achakura-san" (あちゃくらさん捕獲の回, Achakura-san Hokaku no Kai); "The 'All Hope is Lost' Pose" (解き放たれた希望のポーズの回, Tokihanatare ta Kibō no Pōzu no Kai); "Nagato & Tsuruya vs. Santa" (長門＆鶴屋vsサンタの回, Nagato & Tsuruya vs Santa no Kai); "Mikuru the Sheep Debuts in a Chaotic First Dream of the Year" (カオスな初夢でみくる羊初登場の回, Kaosu na Hatsuyume de Mikuru Hitsuji Hatsutōjō no Kai); "Mori-san Makes a Shocking First Appearance" (森さん衝撃の初登場の回, Mori-san Shōgeki no Hatsutōjō no Kai); "Kyon and Koizumi Become Hosts" (キョンと古泉ホストになる回, Kyon to Koizumi Hosuto ni Naru Kai); "An Infinity Lion Comes Calling" (無限ライオン初登場の回, Mugen Raion Hatsutōjō no Kai); "Trying Out Mail-Order Shopping" (通販はじめましたの回, Tsūhan Hajimemashita no Kai)
2	December 20, 2008	978-404715-158-1	May 31, 2011	978-031608-958-6
"Choosing to Stay Indoors" (あえてお部屋で…の回, Aete o Heya de… no Kai); "Introducing Kimidori-san" (キミドリさん初登場の回, Kimidori-san Hatsutōjō no Kai); "Tsuruya-san vs Mecha Mori-san & The Masked Mustache" (鶴屋さんvsメカ森さんアーンドひげ仮面の回, Tsuruya-san vs Meka Mori-san & Hige Kamen no Kai); "Hooray for Hiking" (ハイキングヤッホーな回, Haikingu Yahhō na kai); "Tanabata with a Special Guest" (七夕であの人登場の回, Tanabata de Ano Hito Tōjō no Kai); "Can't Have a Deserted Island Without Swimsuits" (無人島で水着が大事な回, Mujintō de Mizugi ga Daiji na Kai); "Can't Have Moongazing Without Bunnies" (月見でバニーが大事な回, Tsukimi de Banī ga Daiji na Kai); "Learning the Basics of Being a Maid" (メイドの極意を知る回, Meido no Gokui Oshiru Kai); "The Quiz Show is On" (クイズ番組はじめましたの回, Kuizu Bangumi Hajimemashita no Kai); "The SOS Brigade wants to Make a Syndicated Drama" (SOS団でドラマ作りたい回, SOS-dan de Dorama Tsukuritai Kai); "Healthy Cooking" (ヘルシークッキングの回, Herushī Kukkingu no Kai); "A Day with Achakura-san" (あちゃくらさんの1日の回, Achakura-san no 1-Nichi no Kai)
3	July 25, 2009	978-404715-263-2	August 16, 2011	978-031618-763-3
"The Disappearance of Haruhi-chan" (ハルヒちゃんの消失の回, Haruhi-chan no Shōshitsu no Kai); "The Brigade Members' Vacation" (団員たちの休日の回, Danin-tachi no Kyūjitsu no Kai); "Poor Taniguchi at the Autumn Festival" (秋祭りで谷口かわいそうな回, Akimatsuri de Taniguchi Kawaisō na Kai); "The Very Serious Eating Contest" (ガチンコ大食い大会の回, Gachinko Dai Kui Taikai no Kai); "At Christmas, Good Kids Get..." (クリスマスには良い子で…の回, Kurisumasuni wa Yoiko de... no Kai); "The Chaotic First Dream of the Year" (カオスな初夢再び？の回, Kaosu na Hatsuyume Futatabi? no Kai); "Haruhi and Kyon on Sesubun" (節分でハルヒとキョンが…の回, Setsubun de Haruhi to Kyon ga... no Kai); "This is how I Draw Manga" (これがあたしの漫画道の回, Kore ga Atashi no Manga-michi Kai); "Haruhi's Room" (ハルヒの部屋の回, Haruhi no Heya no Kai); "The Haunted House" (お化け屋敷はじめましたの回, Obake Yashiki Hajimemashita no Kai); "The Secret Ingredient" (隠し味は…？の回, Kakushi Mi wa...? no Kai); "Video Game Envy" (部室にゲーム機があってうらやましい回, Bushitsu ni Gēmu-ki ga Atte Urayamashī Kai)
4	December 23, 2009	978-404715-352-3	November 22, 2011	978-031619-577-5
"The Anti-April Fool Meeting" (エイプリルフール対策会議の回, Eipurirufūru Taisaku Kaigi no Kai); "Springtime Brigade Member Recruiting" (春の新団員募集中の回, Haru no Shin Danin Boshū-chū no Kai); "The Case File of Ryouko Asakura" (朝倉涼子の事件簿の回, Asakura Ryōko no Jiken-bo no Kai); "Before the Battle Against the Computer Club..." (コンピ研との勝負の前に…の回, Konpi-ken to no Shōbu no Mae ni... no Kai); "New Event: Revolver Othelot?!" (新競技リボルバーオセロット！？の回, Shin Kyōgi Riborubā Oserotto!? no Kai); "The Hard-Won Swimsuit Comes with a Price" (努力して勝ち取った水着にこそ価値がある回, Doryoku Shite Kachitotta Mizugi ni Koso Kachigāru Kai); "The Heart-Pounding Date of Kyon and Haruhi" (キョンとハルヒのドキドキデート回, Kyon to Haruhi no Doki Doki Dēto Kai); "The North High Festival" (北高文化祭の回, Kitakou Bunkamatsuri no Kai); "Asakura-san Returns to Her Normal Size" (朝倉さんが元のサイズになる回, Asakura-san ga Moto no Saizu ni Naru Kai); "SOS-Style Exercise" (SOS式エクササイズの回, SOS-shiki Ekusasaizu no Kai); "The Suzumiya Mystery Investigation Squad Begins" (涼宮ミステリー調査班発足の回, Suzumiya Misuterī Chōsa Han Hossoku no Kai)
5	November 26, 2010	978-404715-561-9	March 27, 2012	978-031620-945-8
"A Chaotic New Year's Dream" (カオスな初夢の回, Kaosu na Hatsuyume no Kai); "Ryouko Asakura's Apprenticeship" (朝倉涼子弟子入りの回, Asakura Ryōko Deshiiri no Kai); "Identity Loss" (アイデンティティ喪失の回, Aidentiti Sōshitsu no Kai); "It's Always My Turn" (ずっとあたしのターンの回, Zutto Atashi no Tān no Kai); "The Activities of Mikuru Asahina" (朝比奈みくるの活躍の回, Asahina Mikuru no Katsuyaku no Kai); "Starting Over with Tiny-Sized Characters" (ミニキャラでーからやり直す回, Mini Kyara dē Kara Yarinaosu Kai); "Koizumi, with Arakawa-san..." (古泉が新川さんと…の回, Koizumi ga Arakawa-san to... no Kai); "Kyon Nursing Battle" (キョンの看病No.1決定戦の回, Kyon no Kanbyō No.1 Kettei-sen no Kai); "Back to that Wonderful Youth" (あの農晴らしい青春をもう一度の回, Ano Nō Harerashī Seishun o Mōichido no Kai); "Switching the Characters' Personalities Around" (キャラの性格入れ替わりの回, Kyara no Seikaku Irekawari no Kai); "Infinity Lion Rescue Mission" (無限ライオン救出大作戦の回, Mugen Raion Kyūshutsu Dai Sakusen no Kai); "Big-Time Cleanup, Thankfully" (日ごろの感謝をこめて大掃除の回, Higoro no Kansha o Komete Daisōji no Kai); "Gag Comic Competition" (ツッコミ我慢大会の回, Tsukkomi Gaman Taikai no Kai)
6	September 26, 2011	978-404715-779-8	November 20, 2012	978-031622-914-2
"The Standard Swimsuit Episode" (お約束の水着回, O Yakusoku no Mizugi Kai); "Exercising with Difficult Words" (難しい言葉で体育する回, Muzukashī Kotoba de Taiiku Suru Kai); "Nagato Clan Cultural Festival" (長門家文化祭の回, Nagato-ka Bunkamatsuri no Kai); "That's Kinda How Christmas Goes" (クリスマスはなんかそういうんじゃない回, Kurisumasu wa Nanka Sōiu n Janai Kai); "Shrine Visits and Karuta" (初詣とかるたの回, Hatsumōde to Karuta no Kai); "Turning Into A Fuzzy Cat" (猫になってふかふかの回, Neko ni Natte Fukafuka no Kai); "Haruhi Suzumiya... Transfers" (涼宮ハルヒ、転校…の回, Suzumiya Haruhi, Tenkō... no Kai); "Climbing The Steps of Adulthood on Children's Day: Part 1" (こどもの日は大人の階段を上る日～前編～の回, Kodomonohi wa Otona no Kaidanwonoboru-bi ~Zenpen~ no Kai); "Climbing The Steps of Adulthood on Children's Day: Part 2" (こどもの日は大人の階段を上る日～後編～の回, Kodomonohi wa Otona no Kaidanwonoboru-bi ~Kōhen~ no Kai)
7	November 26, 2012	978-404120-493-1	September 24, 2013	978-031624-310-0
"Autumn It Up" (秋じみたことをしてみる回, Aki Jimita Koto o Shite Miru Kai); "A Day At The Nagato Residence" (長門家の一日の回, Nagato-ka no Ichi-nichi no Kai); "Best Moments So Far: A Retrospective" (振り返って選りすぐりシーン人気投票の回, Furikaette Erisuguri Shīn Ninki Tōhyō no Kai); "Not So Long After She Was Miniaturized" (小さくなって間もない頃の回, Chīsaku Natte Mamonai-goro no Kai); "Stolen In The Moonlight" (月明かり浴びて盗み出す回, Tsukiakari Abite Nusumidasu Kai); "Let's Do A Doujinshi Event" (同人誌即売会に出ようの回, Dōjinshi Sokubaikai ni Deyou no Kai); "Installation Of A Complaint Box" (目安箱みたいなポストを設置する回, Meyasu-bako Mitai na Posuto o Setchi Suru Kai); "Intruding At The Nagato Residence" (長門家にお邪魔する回, Nagato-ka ni Ojamasuru Kai); "Swords and Sorcery" (剣と魔法のファンタジー回, Ken to Mahō no Fantajī Kai); "High Performance Kimidori-san" (高性能キミドリさんの回, Kōseinō Kimidori-san no Kai); "It's Christmas, and Yet - The Great Game Of Life" (クリスマスなのに巨大人生スゴロク回, Kurisumasu Nano ni Kyodai Jinsei Sugoroku Kai); "Kyon's Sunday" (キョンの日曜日の回, Kyon no Nichiyōbi no Kai); "Everybody's New Years" (それぞれのお正月の回, Sorezore no Oshōgatsu no Kai); "Things Get RPGish" (RPGっぽくなっちゃう回, RPG-ppoku Natchau Kai); "Mikuru-sensei and Her Kindergarteners" (みくるせんせいと園児たちの回, Mikuru-sensei to Enji-tachi no Kai); "White Day" (ホワイトデーの回, Howaitodē no Kai); "Buckets" (バケッツの回, Bakettsu no Kai); "Late Night With Radio Suzumiya" (ラジオ「MC涼宮の不思議倶楽部」の回, Rajio 'MC Suzumiya no Fushigi Kurabu' no Kai); "The Disappearance of Kimidori-san" (キミドリさんが消える日の回, Kimidori-san ga Kieruhi no Kai)
8	December 26, 2013	978-404120-955-4	October 28, 2014	978-031633-615-4
"The Long-Awaited Appearance of the Sasaki Brigade?" (佐々木団、満を持して登場？の回, Sasaki-dan, Manwojishite Tōjō? no Kai); "Barbecue and Hand-to-Hand Combat" (焼肉とは格闘技であるの回, Yakiniku to wa Kakutōgidearu no Kai); "Certification for Life in our Difficult Modern Society" (厳しい現代社会を生き抜くための検定の回, Kibishii Gendai Shakai o Ikinuku Tame no Kentei no Kai); "Adult Mikuru Enjoys Summer" (大人みくるが夏を満喫する回, Otona Mikuru ga Natsu o Mankitsu-suru Kai); "Celebrating the Completion of the Endless Eight" (祝！エンドレスエイト完走の回, Iwai! Endoresu Eito Kansō no Kai); "A Change of Costume" (衣替えならぬコスチュームチェンジの回, Koromogae Naranu Kosuchūmu Chenji no Kai); "The Legendary Covert Ops" (伝説の暗躍の回, Densetsu no Anyaku no Kai); "Snowball Fight" (雪合戦の回, Yukigassen no Kai); "The First New Year's Dream in Quite a While" (とても久しぶりの初夢の回, Totemo Hisashiburi no Hatsuyume no Kai); "Extortion on Valentine's and Setsubun" (節分とバレンタインとカツアゲの回, Setsubun to Barentain to Katsuage no Kai); "The Melancholy of Suzumiya Haruhi-chan, Part One: The End" (涼宮ハルヒちゃんの憂鬱、第一部完の回, Suzumiya Haruhi-chan no Yūutsu, Daiichibu Kan no Kai); "Soccer out of Boredom" (退屈なのでサッカーをする回, Taikutsu nano de Sakkā o suru Kai); "Magical☆Ryouko's Back" (帰ってきたマジカル☆涼子の回, Kaettekita Majikaru☆Ryōko no Kai); "Considering Special Abilities" (特殊能力について考える回, Tokushu Nōryoku ni Tsuite Kangaeru Kai); "Clubroom Soccer" (部屋サッカーの回, Heya Sakkā no Kai); "I Want to Make a Zombie Show" (ゾンビ番組を作りたい回, Zonbi Bangumi o Tsukuritai Kai); "I Want to Make a Superhero Show" (ヒーロー番組を作りたい回, Hīrō Bangumi o Tsukuritai Kai)
9	March 4, 2014	978-404121-040-6	January 20, 2015	978-031625-939-2
"New Member Welcome Party" (新入団員歓迎の回, Shinnyū Danin Kangei no Kai); "The Long-Awaited Swimsuit Episode" (みなさん待望の水着の回, Mina-san Taibō no Mizugi no Kai); "Nagato-san... Collapses!?" (長門さん、倒れる…！？の回, Nagato-san, Taoreru...!? no Kai); "The Regular October Secret Meeting Featuring Tachibana" (10月定例暗躍会議with橘の回, 10-Tsuki Teirei Anyaku Kaigi with Tachibana no Kai); "Touring The Power Spots of North High" (北高のパワースポットめぐりの回, Kitakou no Pawā Supotto Meguri no Kai); "House Party at Nagato's" (長門家ホームパーティーの回, Nagato-ka Hōmupātī no Kai); "First Secret Meeting Jitters" (初心暗躍表明の回, Ubu Anyaku Hyōmei no Kai); "Yasumi-chan's Sleepytime" (ヤスミちゃんのおやすみ回, Yasumi-chan no Oyasumi Kai); "The Intrigues of Koizumi Itsuki-kun: 'Training'" (古泉一樹くんの陰謀「トレーニング」, Koizumi Itsuki-kun no Inbō 'Torēningu'); "The Intrigues of Koizumi Itsuki-kun: 'Catch'" (古泉一樹くんの陰謀「キャッチボール」, Koizumi Itsuki-kun no Inbō 'Kyacchi Bōru'); "The Intrigues of Koizumi Itsuki-kun: 'Desert Island'" (古泉一樹くんの陰謀「無人島視察」, Koizumi Itsuki-kun no Inbō 'Mujintō Shisatsu'); "The Intrigues of Koizumi Itsuki-kun: 'Secret Ops with Kyon'" (古泉一樹くんの陰謀「キョンと暗躍」, Koizumi Itsuki-kun no Inbō 'Kyon to Anyaku')
10	March 26, 2015	978-404102-878-0	December 15, 2015	978-031635-191-1
11	February 4, 2017	978-404105-043-9	December 19, 2017	978-031641-405-0
12	May 1, 2019	978-404107-906-5	May 26, 2020	978-197531-079-0

=== The Disappearance of Nagato Yuki-chan ===
Another spinoff manga series was written and illustrated by Puyo. Set in the alternate universe established in The Disappearance of Haruhi Suzumiya, it follows Yuki Nagato as its main protagonist.

No.	Original release date	Original ISBN	English release date	English ISBN
1	February 4, 2010	978-4-04-715405-6	July 24, 2012	978-0-316-21712-5
"Epilogue 1 - My Favourite Place"; "Epilogue 2 - What I Want to Do"; "Epilogue 3 - Shopping Scenery"; "Epilogue 4 - All Together"; "Epilogue 5 - Christmas"; "Epilogue 6 - Just the Two of Us"; "Epilogue 7 - How it Began"
2	November 26, 2010	978-4-04-715562-6	October 30, 2012	978-0-316-21713-2
"Epilogue 8 - Haruhi Suzumiya"; "Epilogue 9 - Trespassing"; "Epilogue 10 - Girl Talk"; "Epilogue 11 - Valentines Day: The Day Before"; "Epilogue 12 - Valentines Day: The Day Of"; "Epilogue 13 - Feelings"; "Epilogue 14 - Romantic Comedy"
3	September 3, 2011	978-4-04-715773-6	January 22, 2013	978-0-316-21714-9
"Epilogue 15 - Returning the Favor"; "Epilogue 16 - New Semester"; "Epilogue 17 - Talk of the Past"; "Epilogue 18 - Study Group"; "Epilogue 19 - Hurdles"; "Epilogue 20 - Travel Guide"; "Epilogue 21 - Seating Order"; "Epilogue 22 - Sightseeing"; "Epilogue 23 - Hot Springs"; "Epilogue 24 - After Dinner"; "Epilogue 25 - Reaching Out"; "Epilogue 26 - Rainy Day"
4	May 2, 2012	978-4-04-120217-3	May 28, 2013	978-0-316-25088-7
"Epilogue 27 - Unease"; "Epilogue 28 - Memory"; "Epilogue 29 - Daily Life"; "Epilogue 30 - Library"; "Epilogue 31 - Library Card"; "Epilogue 32 - End of Testing"; "Epilogue 33 - Confession"
5	November 26, 2012	978-4-04-120498-6	February 18, 2014	978-0-316-32235-5
"Epilogue 34 - Dream"; "Epilogue 35 - Tanabata"; "Epilogue 36 - Summer Vacation: Ocean"; "Epilogue 37 - Summer Vacation: Mountains"; "Epilogue 38 - Summer Vacation: Festival"; "Epilogue 39 - Summer Vacation: Homework"; "Bonus Material: Senpai"
6	December 26, 2013	978-4-04-120960-8	September 23, 2014	978-0-316-33607-9
"Epilogue 40 - Self-Introduction"; "Epilogue 41 - Programming Meeting"; "Epilogue 42 - Going Home"; "Epilogue 43 - Festival Preparation (Kyon) 1"; "Epilogue 44 - Festival Preparation (Kyon) 2"; "Epilogue 45 - Festival Preparation (Kyon) 3"; "Epilogue 46 - Festival Preparation (Nagato) 1"; "Epilogue 47 - Festival Preparation (Nagato) 2"; "Epilogue 48 - Festival Day"; "Epilogue 49 - Thanks"
7	September 4, 2014	978-4-04-101754-8	March 24, 2015	978-0-316-38374-5
"Epilogue 50 - December 6th"; "Interlude"; "Epilogue 51 - December 8th"; "Epilogue 52 - December 12th 1"; "Epilogue 53 - December 12th 2"; "Epilogue 54 - December 12th 3"; "Epilogue 55 - December 16th"; "Epilogue 56 - December 17th"; "Epilogue 57 - December 24th"; "Extra"
8	March 26, 2015	978-4-04-101755-5	November 17, 2015	978-0-316-35192-8
"Epilogue 58 - New Year Shrine Visit"; "Epilogue 59 - Fortune Slips"; "Epilogue 60 - New Semester"; "Epilogue 61 - Lunch Boxes"; "Epilogue 62 - During Club Activities"; "Epilogue 63 - Caught a Cold"; "Extra"
9	October 26, 2015	978-4-04-102882-7	March 22, 2016	978-0-316-31493-0
"Epilogue 64 - I Am..."; "Epilogue 65 - In With The Luck"; "Epilogue 66 - Date 1"; "Epilogue 67 - Date 2"; "Epilogue 68 - Date 3"; "Epilogue 69 - Date 4"; "Epilogue 70 - Senpai"; "Bonus"
10	February 4, 2017	978-4-04-105044-6	October 31, 2017	978-0-316-47642-3
"Epilogue 71 - The Disappearance of Ryouko Asakura I"; "Epilogue 72 - The Disappearance of Ryouko Asakura II"; "Epilogue 73 - The Disappearance of Ryouko Asakura III"; "Epilogue 74 - The Disappearance of Ryouko Asakura IV"; "Epilogue 75 - The Disappearance of Ryouko Asakura V"; "Epilogue 76 - The Disappearance of Ryouko Asakura VI"; "Epilogue 77 - The Disappearance of Ryouko Asakura VII"; "Epilogue 78 - The Disappearance of Ryouko Asakura VIII"; "Episode I - Epilogue"

=== Haruhi's Comic Anthology ===
==== The Celebration of Haruhi Suzumiya ====
This is an omnibus of three anthologies containing short stories from several different manga artists. On March 4, 2014, Yen Press announced they had acquired the license for the North American release.

The cover art is by Noizi Ito and the colour illustrations inside are by Puyo, Gaku Tsugano, Hiroaki Samura, Naru Nanao, Yasu, Miki Miyashita, Kaishuku, Jinsei Kataoka, Sekihiko Inui, TO18, Hajime Katoki, Okama, TIV and Mine Yoshizaki. There is an afterword at the end of the book that includes comments from every credited author and illustrator.

Title	Original release date	Original ISBN	English release date	English ISBN
"The Contest of Haruhi Suzumiya" (涼宮ハルヒの競演, Suzumiya Haruhi no Kyōen)	March 24, 2009	978-404715-226-7	October 30, 2014	978-031633-613-0
"The Festival of Haruhi Suzumiya" (涼宮ハルヒの祝祭, Suzumiya Haruhi no Shukusai)	July 23, 2009	978-404715-277-9	October 30, 2014	978-031633-613-0
"The Gorgeous Haruhi Suzumiya" (涼宮ハルヒの絢爛, Suzumiya Haruhi no Kenran)	December 23, 2009	978-404715-346-2	October 30, 2014	978-031633-613-0
The Contest of Haruhi Suzumiya: "The World of Haruhi Suzumiya" (Kumichi Yoshizuki); "Spooky Tale" (Seiman Douman); "The Art of Haruhi Suzumiya!?" (Ranmaru Kotone); "A Certain Mushroom" (Ryo Ito); "The Mercenaries of Haruhi Suzumiya" (Satoru Matsubayashi); "The SOS Brigade Got Into Farming." (Fuu Araki); "The Melancholy of Nagato Yuki-san" (Nino); "I Know You" (Sou); "This World of Ours" (Yagi Shinba); "The Legend of Haruhi Suzumiya" (Motoki Takeuchi); "The Makeover of Yuki Nagato" (Itokatsu); "Heart-Pounding School Festival: The Melancholy of Kyon" (Yuki Hibino + Seiryu Shima); "The Explosion of Haruhi Suzumiya" (Ryu Naito); "The Introduction of Yuki Nagato" (Shinichi Fukuda); "Unidentified Giant Life Form Kyon" (Ran Igarashi); "Chapter 45: "The Alien Asakura's Spirit of Infinite Challenge"" (Mebuki Tomonaga); "The Man From Beneath The Ground" (Yoshi Amagasaki); The Festival of Haruhi Suzumiya: "The Essence of Haruhi Suzumiya" (Osamu Takahashi); "The Disappearance of Tsuruya-san" (Wataru Watanabe); "The Tea of Yuki Nagato" (Renga Kijima); "Pointless Days" (Atsu Suzumi); "Searching" (Seiman Douman); "Alien Bonding" (Yuu Tachibana); "If That Is What You Choose" (Benjamin); "SOS Rangers!" (Naru Narumi); "It's So '80s to Hear "Brigade Chief" and Think of Sunglasses" (Terepin Uona); "The Disappearance of Asakura's Stew" (Morohe Yoshida); "In Production" (Keiji Watarai); "The SOS Brigade's Rest" (Bomi); "The Cheek of Yuki Nagato" (Haruka Mori); "The Wars of Haruhi Suzumiya" (Hayato Aoki); "The Nightmare of Haruhi Suzumiya" (You Kirishima); "The Heroes of Haruhi Suzumiya" (Makoto Kuon); "The Secret of Koizumi Itsuki" (Paruko Shinsaibashi); "For You..." (Yu-ji); "Change-Up!" (Yuka Kanaria)); The Gorgeous Haruhi Suzumiya: "Simmering Mikuru" (Nylon); "S or B?" (Taishi Zao); "There Are Others!?" (Eiki Eiki); "Have Some Sympathy, Big Brother!" (Beruno Mikawa); "The First of Haruhi Suzumiya" (Izumi Kazuto); "The Timidity of Haruhi Suzumiya" (Ryuji Gotsubo); "The Melancholy of the Same Old After-School Hours at the Dawn of the Long, Long Summer Break in the Second Year of High School" (Ryo Akizugi); "The Passion of Asakura and Nagato" (Ayun Tachibana); "The Delusions of Haruhi Suzumiya" (Astroguy II); "Don't Push the Enter Key" (Shinobu Shiozaki); "The Ramble of Haruhi Suzumiya" (Ran Igarashi); "Ponytails, Nagato-san" (Nagii Takatsuki); "Kyon and the Sick Day" (Ryota Yuzuki); "The Cooking of Haruhi Suzumiya" (Koizumi); "The Interrogation of Haruhi Suzumiya" (Hiro Sakurada); "Koizumi-kun and the Defiance of Rationality" (Shimada); "Hard-Won Boredom" (Kota Shirahama); "The Haunting of Haruhi Suzumiya" (Sakutaro Kagurazaka); "Mystérique Lump" (As-Special); "The Melancholy of Two-Thirds of One Year of Kyon" (Hiro Kiyohara); "Haruhi's Operation: Music Video ☆" (Mitsue Aoki); "The Celebration of Haruhi Suzumiya" (Afterword)

==== The Misfortune of Kyon & Koizumi ====
This is a one off collection of nineteen short stories by fifteen different manga artists. On April 8, 2012, Yen Press announced they had acquired the license for the North American release.
The cover art is by Aya Shouoto and the colour illustrations inside are by Akiho Narimiya and Ren Hidoh. There is an afterword at the end of the book that includes comments from every credited author and illustrator.

No.	Original release date	Original ISBN	English release date	English ISBN
1	December 26, 2009	978-404715-359-2	February 26, 2013	978-031622-871-8
"An SOS to You" (Watari); "The Derangement of ◌◌" (Youko Fujioka); "Closed Space ☆ Scramble!" (Mikimaki); "The Web Design of Kyon & Koizumi" (Mikimaki); "Kyon's Romantic History" (Mikimaki); "Snowy Mountain Syndrome Sufferers" (Mikimaki); "The Tenacity of Koizumi Itsuki" (Nao Katou); "The Transformation of Kyon" (Kaine Akiduki); "The Exchange of Kyon & Koizumi" (Ayumi Kanou); "Treasure Hunter Haruhi" (Yuzuru Asahina); "Not Like This." (Soyogo Iwaki); "The Boredom of Kyon-kun" (Takumi Yoshimura); "Bamboo-Cutter SOS!" (Mira Kajiyama); "The Mountain Mayhem of Kyon & Koizumi!" (Uka Nagao); "Trashy Advice" (Uka Nagao); "Spicy Spring" (Haru Akiyoshi); "Killing Time" (Yoshitsugu Katagiri); "With Kyon-kun!" (Suzu Kouno); "The Disappearance of Itsuki Koizumi" (Kanan Sawatari)
