= Trois (album) =

Studio album by Dustz
- Released: December 14, 2011
- Genre: Rock
- Length: 49:30
- Label: Epic Records

Singles from Trois
- 1. "Break & Peace" Released: May 27, 2009; 2. "Brilliant Day" Released: October 7, 2009; 3. "Criez" Released: April 6, 2011; 4. "spiral" Released: August 31, 2011

Trois is the debut album by Japanese rock band Dustz, released on December 14, 2011. The album's title is taken from the French word for the number three, as the band consists of three members who are fluent in three languages: Japanese, French, and English. The album will feature the band's four major release singles "Break & Peace", "Brilliant Day", "Criez", and "spiral". Trois will also include a cover of Dragon Ash's "Fantasista", with guest musicians Wes Borland and John Otto of Limp Bizkit.

== Track listing ==
No.	Title	Lyrics	Music	Length
1.	"Toi=Moi:▽"	Dustz	Dustz, BOND×L!TH!UM	3:20
2.	"spiral"	Dustz	Dustz, BOND×L!TH!UM	3:38
3.	"Fantasista"	Kj	Kj	4:18
4.	"Re:member"	Dustz	Dustz, BOND×L!TH!UM	4:37
5.	"FLY"	Gus, Ray	Ray	3:29
6.	"Orphee"	Dustz	Dustz, BOND×L!TH!UM	5:21
7.	"Ca, c'est Paris!" (DUSTZ Version)	Jacques Mardochee Charles, Francois Paul Leon Pruvost, Lucien Jean Boyer	Jose Padilla Sanchez	3:46
8.	"Hoshikuzu Meiro ~Lost in Star Dustz~" (ホシクズメイロ ～Lost in Star Dustz～)	Dustz	Dustz, BOND×L!TH!UM	4:24
9.	"Border Line"	Ray	Ray	3:36
10.	"Criez"	Dustz	Dustz, BOND×L!TH!UM	4:11
11.	"Break & Peace" (Ver.1.3)	Ray	Ray	4:29
12.	"Brilliant Day" (DJ BASS Low-Life-Dogs Mix)	Ray	Dustz	4:17
Total length:				49:30
