= Kitchen Princess =

Manga

- Cover of the first volume of the English release as published by Del Rey, depicting Najika

キッチンのお姫さま (Kitchen no Ohime-sama)
- Genre: Cooking, drama, romance
- Manga
- Written by: Miyuki Kobayashi
- Illustrated by: Natsumi Andō
- Published by: Kodansha
- English publisher: NA: Del Rey Manga (former); Kodansha USA (current)
- Magazine: Nakayoshi
- Original run: September 2004 – October 2008
- Volumes: 10
- Light novel

Kitchen Princess: Search for the Angel Cake
- Written by: Miyuki Kobayashi
- Illustrated by: Natsumi Ando
- Published by: Kodansha
- English publisher: NA: Del Rey
- Published: March 19, 2008
- Volumes: 1
- Manga

Kitchen Princess: One More Plate
- Written by: Miyuki Kobayashi
- Illustrated by: Natsumi Andō
- Published by: Kodansha
- Magazine: Nakayoshi
- Original run: April 3, 2026 – May 2, 2026
- icon

Kitchen Princess (Japanese: キッチンのお姫さま, Hepburn: Kicchin no Ohime-sama) is a Japanese manga series written by Miyuki Kobayashi and illustrated by Natsumi Andō. Appearing as a serial in Kodansha's shōjo manga magazine Nakayoshi from the September 2004 to the October 2008 issues, its forty-seven chapters were compiled into ten bound volumes. It also includes recipes for each featured dish at the end of each chapter. The series marked the first time that Ando illustrated a manga that was not also written by her. Set in modern-day Japan, Kitchen Princess follows Najika Kazami, a cheerful thirteen-year-old girl who searches for her "flan prince", a boy who rescued her from drowning as a young girl and brought a little happiness to her life after her parents' death. In March 2008, Kodansha published a related light novel, Kitchen Princess: Search for the Angel Cake, written by Kobayashi and illustrated by Ando.

In 2006, Del Rey Manga licensed the series for an English-language translation in North America. It published the ten volumes from January 2007 to July 2009. Following Kodansha's decision to publish in North America through an imprint, Kodansha USA released a four-volume omnibus edition from June 2012 to June 2013. The series has been well received by English-language readers, with the appearance of three volumes and one omnibus on various bestseller lists and the series appearing twice on ICv2's annual list of the top twenty-five manga properties. Critical reception ranged from positive to lukewarm, and the series won the 2006 Kodansha Manga Award for children's manga.

== Plot ==
Set in modern-day Japan, the plot centers on Najika Kazami (風見 七虹香, Kazami Najika), a cheerful thirteen-year-old girl with an excellent sense of taste who hopes to become a chef. In her backstory, it is revealed that a mysterious boy rescued her from drowning in Hokkaidō as a young, recently orphaned girl and gave her flan to cheer her up. Before he left, she promised to make him the best-tasting dessert in the world. Now on a journey to find her "flan prince," as she calls him, Najika attends Seika Academy in Tokyo, after she learned that the silver spoon her flan prince left her is unique to the school. There she befriends Sora Kitazawa (北沢 空, Kitazawa Sora), the substitute director of the academy, and his younger brother Daichi Kitazawa (北沢 大地, Kitazawa Daichi). Although teen model Akane Kishida (岸田 茜, Kishida Akane) initially dislikes her, they eventually become friends after Najika heals her eating disorder by making her her grandmother's recipe. Najika periodically competes in cooking competitions, both formal and informal, while working at the diner run by the skilled, yet lazy chef Fujita (フジタ).

Najika falls in love with Sora after he tells her that he is her flan prince, but he dies after being struck by a truck while on a journey to deliver some ingredients to Najika. In his final moments, admits that he lied about being her flan prince, having fallen in love with her. She loses her sense of taste out of sorrow, but quickly recovers it. After Sora's death, Daichi is unable to bring himself to act on his love for her, though he gives in to his father's demands to protect Najika from being kicked out of the school and becomes the student body president to replace Sora. Wealthy and conceited junior pastry chef Seiya Mizuno (水野 星夜, Mizuno Seiya) also begins to attend the school, where he clashes with Najika, whom he had watched bake as a young girl at the orphanage. Seiya eventually falls in love with her, and tries to romantically pursue her, although he gives up when he realizes that she loves Daichi. After Daichi recovers a repressed memory of his mother's death during a family trip to Hokkaidō—which Sora attempted to protect him from by lying about being Najika's flan prince—he remembers that he is actually her flan prince, having given her a flan made by Seiya, and accepts her feelings for him. A joyful Najika fulfills her promise to him by making him a crème brûlée.

== Development ==
The writer of Kitchen Princess, Miyuki Kobayashi, is a novelist published under Kodansha's X Bunko Teen Heart label. When deciding on a story, she first creates the names, then the plot: Najika's name—meaning "seven", "rainbow" and "fragrance"—was designed to be "ethnically ambiguous" and carry a sense of nature, while Daichi and Sora's names, meaning "earth" and "sky" respectively, were meant "to match hers". Akane's name, which means "deep red", was intended to evoke the evening sun for the reader. Kitchen Princess marked the first time that manga artist Natsumi Ando illustrated a manga that was not also written by her. Despite this, she did make some changes to the original script; she suggested to Kobayashi that Hagio, the head of the orphanage, be an elderly woman and Fujita, initially an elderly woman, a "rugged man". Ando made it a personal rule to have each of the splash pages contain an illustration of food.

== Media ==
=== Manga ===
Written by Miyuki Kobayashi and illustrated by Natsumi Ando, the forty-seven chapters appeared as a serial in the shōjo (targeted towards girls) manga magazine Nakayoshi from the September 2004 issue to the October 2008 issue. Kodansha collected the chapters into ten bound volumes, and published them from February 4, 2005, to November 6, 2008.

At the 2006 Comic-Con, Del Rey Manga announced that it had licensed Kitchen Princess for an English-language translation in North America. Del Rey published the volumes from January 30, 2007, to July 7, 2009. Following Kodansha's decision to publish its titles in North America through an imprint, including those formerly licensed to Del Rey Manga, Kodansha USA later published a four-volume omnibus edition of Kitchen Princess from June 5, 2012, to June 18, 2013. Digital editions of the series have also been published by Kodansha in the United Kingdom. The series has also been licensed in Hong Kong, Korea, Thailand, and Taiwan.

A two-chapter sequel manga, titled Kitchen Princess: One More Plate, was serialized in the same magazine between April 3 and May 2, 2026.

=== Light novel ===
On March 19, 2008, Kodansha published a light novel written by Kobayashi and illustrated by Ando, Kitchen Princess: Search for the Angel Cake (なかよし文庫 小説 キッチンのお姫さま 天使のケーキを探せ！, Nakayoshi Bunko Shōsetsu Kitchin no Ohime-sama Tenshi no Kēki o Sagase!). Comprising four story arcs named after the seasons, the novel follows Najika's quest to duplicate a white cake recipe for a classmate's grandmother. Del Rey published an English-language translation on November 10, 2009.

== Reception ==
Kitchen Princess was well received by English-language readers, with three original volumes and one omnibus volume placing on either BookScan's list of the top twenty bestselling graphic novels, or The New York Times manga bestseller list. The sixth volume placed eighteenth on BookScan's list for May 2008. The seventh volume appeared at the fifteenth spot for BookScan's list for August 2008. In 2009, the tenth volume debuted at the seventh place on The New York Times manga bestseller list for the week of July 5 to 11; during the following week, it dropped to the eighth place and remained there for another week. In 2012, the second volume of the omnibus edition appeared at the ninth place for the week of October 14–20. The series placed nineteenth on ICv2's top twenty-five manga properties for 2008, dropping to the twentieth spot a year later. The series also placed seventh on ICv2's list of the top ten shōjo properties for 2009, and appeared at the eighth spot of the ten bestselling shōjo series for the first quarter of 2010.

Kitchen Princess won the Kodansha Manga Award for children's manga in 2006. The series has received a range of reviews, from positive to lukewarm. Publishers Weekly enjoyed that Najika was not given a magical power and had to keep improving her cooking skills. Although the reviewer for School Library Journal described the series as "a perfectly ordinary romance manga," he praised Nunzio Defilippis and Christina Weir's adaptation of the manga. Deb Aoki of About.com listed the manga as one of the best shōjo series. Jason Thompson rated the series 3.5 out of 4 stars, describing it as "[a] quick, delightful read." Another reviewer for Publishers Weekly, Johanna Draper Carlsen, wrote that she found the manga reminiscent of the romantic comedy film Simply Irresistible (1999) and that the manga contained conventional shōjo aspects. In a later review of the second volume, she described the series as "entertaining enough, but it's fluffy and forgettable (like so many of the mousse items and drinks Najika makes). The volumes already feel familiar, even as I'm reading them for the first time." Mania Entertainment's Sakura Eries expressed her lukewarm feelings towards the first volume, writing that the reader's suspension of disbelief was vital to enjoying the manga. She disliked the two-dimensional characterization and Ando's illustrations of the characters, but felt that the food was well-drawn. Comparing the series to others in the cooking genre, she wrote that it differed in that "cooking is Najika's expression of self and her means of creating relationships and drawing others to common ground (like the estranged Kitazawa Brothers)." In follow-up reviews of the second and third volumes, she remained lukewarm to the series; she praised Kobayashi's portrayal of Akane's eating disorder but disliked how Najika's quest to find her flan prince seemed to become more of a side-plot. Carlo Santos of Anime News Network praised Najika as a likeable protagonist and the characterizations as believable. He enjoyed the plot and recipes, although he wrote that the character designs lacked creativity, and criticized the plot clichés and the antagonists' weak characterization. He had mixed feelings about the fourth volume's emphasis on conventional shōjo romance and plot twists at the cost of its cooking aspect. He found the artwork conventional, though able to convey emotion. He wrote that the fifth volume finally balanced the romance and cooking elements, although he disliked the inclusion of a side story, preferring another chapter instead. In his review of the seventh volume, he concluded: "this series takes the hoariest elements of the romance/drama/cooking genres and still manages to come up with something greater than the sum of its parts."

Reviews of the light novel varied. Draper Carlsen wrote that the characters and premise lacked the strength to make the novel compelling, though she felt that the response of others may differ. Grading the novel a B, Eries wrote that the novel would appeal to fans of the manga, although she found the story arcs varying in quality and content, from junior-high school romance to philosophy on death.
