= List of Cells at Work! chapters =

Cells at Work! is a Japanese manga series written and illustrated by Akane Shimizu. It was serialized in Kodansha's shōnen manga magazine Monthly Shōnen Sirius from January 26, 2015, to January 26, 2021. Kodansha has collected the manga into six tankōbon volumes.

Kodansha USA announced that it had licensed Cells at Work! in North America on March 21, 2016.

Kodansha USA has also licensed most of its spin-offs.

== Volumes ==
=== Cells at Work! ===
No.	Original release date	Original ISBN	North America release date	North America ISBN
1	July 9, 2015	978-4-06-376560-1	November 1, 2016	978-1-63236-356-5
1. "Pneumococcus" (肺炎球菌, Haienkyūkin); 2. "Cedar Pollen Allergy" (スギ花粉アレルギー, Sugi Kafun Arerugī); 3. "Influenza" (インフルエンザ, Infuruenza); 4. "Scrape Wound" (すり傷, Surikizu)
2	November 20, 2015	978-4-06-376589-2	December 27, 2016	978-1-63236-357-2
5. "Food Poisoning" (食中毒, Shokuchūdoku); 6. "Heat Stress" (熱中症, Netchūshō); 7. "Erythroblasts and Myelocytes" (赤芽球と骨髄球, Sekigakyū to Kotsuzuikyū); 8. "Cancer Cells (Part I)" (がん細胞（前編）, Gan Saibō (Zenpen)); 9. "Cancer Cells (Part II)" (がん細胞（後編）, Gan Saibō (Kōhen))
3	June 9, 2016	978-4-06-390633-2	March 28, 2017	978-1-63236-390-9
10. "The Circulatory System" (血液循環, Ketsueki Junkan); 11. "The Common Cold" (風邪症候群, Kaze Shōkōgun); 12. "Thymocytes" (胸腺細胞, Kyōsen Saibō); 13. "Acquired Immunity" (獲得免疫, Kakutoku Men'eki); 14. "Acne" (ニキビ, Nikibi)
4	November 30, 2016	978-4-06-390664-6	May 2, 2017	978-1-63236-391-6
15. "Staphylococcus aureus" (黄色ブドウ球菌, Ōshoku Budō Kyūkin); 16. "Dengue Fever" (デング熱, Dengu Netsu); 17. "Hypovolemic Shock (Part I)" (出血性ショック（前編）, Shukketsusei Shokku (Zenpen)); 18. "Hypovolemic Shock (Part II)" (出血性ショック（後編）, Shukketsusei Shokku (Kōhen)); 19. "Peyer's Patch" (パイエル板, Paieru-ban)
5	August 9, 2017	978-4-06-390720-9	November 21, 2017	978-1-63236-426-5
20. "H. Pylori" (ピロリ菌, Pirorikin); 21. "Antigenic Shift" (抗原変異, Kōgen Hen'i); 22. "Cytokines" (サイトカイン, Saitokain); 23. "Harmful Bacteria" (悪玉菌, Akudamakin); 24. "Cancer Cell II (Part I)" (がん細胞2（前編）, Gan Saibō Tsū (Zenpen)); 25. "Cancer Cell II (Part II)" (がん細胞2（後編）, Gan Saibō Tsū (Kōhen))
6	February 9, 2021	978-4-06-522252-2	June 22, 2021	978-1-63236-427-2
26. "A Bump on the Head" (たんこぶ, Tankobu); 27. "Left Shift" (左方移動, Hidari ni Idō); 28. "IPS Cells" (ips細胞, Ips Saibō); Special- "Psoriasis" (乾癬, Kansen); 29. "Novel Coronavirus" (新型コロナウイルス, Shingata Koronauirusu)

=== Cells at Work!: Bacteria! ===
Cells at Work!: Bacteria! (はたらく細菌) by Haruyuki Yoshida. The series follows the lives of good and bad bacteria in the intestines. It was serialized in the shōjo manga magazine Nakayoshi from April 3, 2017, to July 3, 2020.

No.	Original release date	Original ISBN	English release date	English ISBN
1	February 9, 2018	978-4-06-510910-6	July 7, 2020	978-1-64659-557-0
"Come Forth, Stinky Farts! Antibacterial Turf War"; "Edible Fiber Incoming! The Good Bacteria Strike Back!"; "Between Encampments - a Micro Meeting!"; "Constipation Consternation! The Bifidum Blues"; "The Most Numerous Bacterium in the Intestines is Me, Bacteroides!"; "Names aren't Everything! Cry of the E. Coli"; "I'll Put Some Pep in your Step! Lactobacillus"; "Skin Condition Crisis! Staphylococcus Epidermis vs. Staphylococcus Aureus"; "I'll Live on your Skin★ Malassezia Fungus"; "Dropping in★ along with Your Food! Natto Bacteria"; "Intestinal Ruin?! Salmonella (First Half)"
2	July 9, 2018	978-4-06-512138-2	August 4, 2020	978-1-64659-619-5
"Intestinal Ruin?! Salmonella (Second Half)"; "Let's Make Magnificent Cavities! Team Cavity Bacteria"; "What're You Doing In the Intestines? Yogurt Bacteria"; "The Pimple's Source: Acne! (Propionibacterium Acnes)"; "Alone With meat... Hehehe ❤ Aspergillus Oryzae (Koji Mold)"; "Th-That Stinks! What On Earth Is That Fluffy Bacterium?!"; "It's In Your Mouth No Matter What?! Periodontal Disease Bacteria"; "Th-Th-That Itches! Athlete's Foot Fungus"
3	October 9, 2018	978-4-06-513423-8	September 1, 2020	978-1-64659-685-0
"Bow Down Before Me. 0157"; "Into the Intestines Together With Vegetables! Butyric-Acid Bacteria"; "It Absorbs Fat?! Sake Lees!"; "Why Do Bad Bacteria Exist...? The Agony of Staphylococcus Aureus"; "I Have Bad Skin Even Though I'm On Top of Skin Care... The Cause Is the Gut?!"; "Stop Holding Back On Going To the Bathroom!"; "What Happens If You Don't Eat Meat...? Nutrients and the Gut"; "Even Around the Eyes! Fierce Battle and the Sty"
4	February 8, 2019	978-4-06-514602-6	October 6, 2020	978-1-64659-748-2
"Ice Cream! Ice! Sherbet! What Would Your Intestines Be Like Then?!"; "Manicure Time♪ But Under Those Nails...? Pseudomonas Aeruginosa"; "We're the Strongest❤ Team Miso!"; "I've Gotta Do Something About This! Chapped Lips"; "Together With You Ever Since You Were A Baby"; "Your Mouth Stinks! What's the Cause?"; "Green Tea's Secret Power Is What?!"; "Extra: You'll Understand In Thirteen Pages! "Cells at Work: Bacteria!""
5	July 9, 2019	978-4-06-516434-1	November 3, 2020	978-1-64659-791-8
"The Angel's A Devil?! A Day In the Life of Bacteroides Bacteria"; "A Must-See! The Correct Way of Washing Your Hands"; "Popping Up On the Finger! Warts!"; "If You Don't Drink Enough Water... Watch Out! The Intestines and Dehydration"; "I Want To Improve! Mouth Discomfort When You Wake Up!"; "Armpit Care Is Important! Armpit Odor Causing Bacteria"; "Red Pimples! What Causes Them?"; "Our Leader Is..."
6	December 9, 2019	978-4-06-518183-6	December 1, 2020	978-1-64659-853-3
"Little Longum and Mini Longum's Efforts!"; "What Happens When the Skin Gets Sunburns?!"; "The Dreadful Norovirus!"; "Familiar Problems! The Fascinating Nail Troubles!"; "This Place Is A Music Venue?! The Bad Bacteria's Rampage!"; "The Dimwitted Bug!"; "Keep Your Legs Beautiful! Your Skin-Care Routine Shouldn't Be All About the Face★"; "The Lactobacilli Who Cheer On the Host"; "More "Cells At Work: Bacteria!""
7	August 6, 2020	978-4-06-520572-3	January 5, 2021	978-1-64659-901-1
"Good Bacteria On the Double!"; "It's Not Just Bacteria! The World of Viruses You Never Knew About"; "The Intestinal Environment Says Everything About the Host's Life"; "The Host's Tiny Slip-Up Stirs Up A Storm and Bacterial Proliferation!"; "The Staphylocococcus Aureus bacteria Aim For A New World Record!"; "The Melancholy of An Elite Streptococcus Pyogenes Bacteria!"; "A Secret Paradise In the Body"; "Bacteria At Work (Part One)"; "Bacteria At Work (Part Two)"

=== Cells NOT at Work! ===
Cells NOT at Work! (はたらかない細胞) by Moe Sugimoto. It follows immature red blood cells (erythroblasts) that do not want to work. It was serialized in Monthly Shōnen Sirius from July 26, 2017, to November 26, 2021.

No.	Original release date	Original ISBN	English release date	English ISBN
1	July 9, 2018	978-4-06-511982-2	October 1, 2019	978-1-64659-012-4
1. "Erythroblasts in Moratorium"; 2. "Cells Unable to Work?"; 3. "Macrophage's Grand Scheme For Enucleation! ☆"; 4. "Artists"; 5. "871's Policy"; 6. "328's Idol"; 7. "What Even Is a Nucleus?"; 8. "Speedy Erythroblasts"; 9. "An Unacceptable Mascot"; 10. "The Immoral Macrophage (Part One)"
2	February 8, 2019	978-4-06-514461-9	November 5, 2019	978-1-64659-097-1
11. "The Immortal Macrophage (Part Two)"; 12. "Macrophage Chronicles"; 13. "Cells with Insomnia"; 14. "Ghost in the Cell"; 15. "A Macro Oath"; 16. "The Fable of King 3104"; 17. "725"; 18. "Enucleation Ceremony"
3	December 9, 2019	978-4-06-517763-1	August 18, 2020	978-1-64659-648-5
19. "A Red Boy with a Green Pet"; 20. "Deep Crimson Takes the Stage"; 21. "Reunion"; 22. "Regarding My Little Sister Being Acquainted with the NEET I Excessively Fret About"; 23. "036's Big Brother"; 24. "Cells Still Not at Work"; 25. "In a Certain Collection Pool"; 26. "An Average Day in the Bone Marrow"; 27. "The Defendant, 871"
4	January 8, 2021	978-4-06-520833-5	August 17, 2021	978-1-63699-300-3
28. "A Shut Door"; 29. "An Afternoon in the Infirmary"; 30. "Meg the Mega-karyocyte"; 31. "Hide & Seek & Molecules"; 32. "A Game of Shi-ritori"; 33. "Cell-tural Exchange"; 34. "Friends"; 35. "Iron's Journey"; 36. "The Duel (Part 1)"; 37. "The Duel (Part 2)"
5	February 9, 2022	978-4-06-526711-0	July 26, 2022	978-1-68491-370-1
38. "All or Nothing!"; 39. "Hero in White"; 40. 1516's Strawberry Diary"; 41. "Monster Teacher"; 41.5. "Meanwhile in the Kidneys"; 42. "Enucleation"; 43. "Head Over Heels Dream Come True"; 44. "What is a Nucleus? Part 2"; 44.5. "Reminiscence"; 45. "Red Blood Cell Nostalgia"; Extra- "Phagocytosis Gourmet"

=== Cells at Work and Friends! ===
Cells at Work and Friends! (はたらく細胞フレンド), written by Kanna Kurono and illustrated by Mio Izumi. It centers around a Killer T Cell who is normally strict with himself and others, but wants to have fun during his free time. He also wants to make friends but does not want to ruin his reputation. It was serialized in the shōjo manga magazine Bessatsu Friend from January 12, 2019, to April 13, 2021.

No.	Original release date	Original ISBN	English release date	English ISBN
1	June 7, 2019	978-4-06-515522-6	October 8, 2019	978-1-64659-065-0
"The Lone Wolf"; "Hot Pot Party"; "Ransomware"; "Flower Viewing"; "Rental Video"; "Tree Climbing"; "Mini Class Reunion"; "Photgenic"
2	November 7, 2019	978-4-06-517636-8	March 10, 2020	978-1-64659-255-5
"Sleep Paralysis"; "Ocean"; "Summer Festival"; "Motivation"; "Tidying Up"; "Recreation"; "Zero Calories"; "Relationship Rumors"
3	March 9, 2020	978-4-06-518909-2	August 11, 2020	978-1-64659-636-2
"After 7"; "Autumn Doldrums"; "Mountains"; "Anger Management"; "Year End Party"; "Preparation"; "New Year Sales"; "Share Boss"
4	July 13, 2020	978-4-06-520155-8	November 10, 2020	978-1-64659-802-1
"Measles"; "Chilly"; "Mite"; "Habit"; "One Team"; "Slump"; "Boot Camp"; "Girls-Only Party"
5	January 13, 2021	978-4-06-522041-2	August 10, 2021	978-1-63699-292-1
"Jogging"; "Bonesetting"; "Training Camp"; "Cashless"; "Clonal Selection"; "Freestyle"; "Latent Infection"; "Loss of Appetite"
6	May 13, 2021	978-4-06-523220-0	December 14, 2021	978-1-63699-518-2
"A Present"; "A Tour Around the Body"; "Countdown"; "Valentine"; "Job Rotation"; "P.R. Movie"; "Staff Reassignment"; "Killer T Cell"

=== Cells at Work!: Platelets! ===
Cells at Work!: Platelets! (はたらく血小板ちゃん, Platelets at Work), written by Kanna Kurono and illustrated by Mio Izumi. It focuses on platelet characters. It was serialized in Monthly Shōnen Sirius from May 25, 2019, to April 26, 2021.

No.	Original release date	Original ISBN	English release date	English ISBN
1	January 9, 2020	978-4-06-518185-0	July 14, 2020	978-1-64659-556-3
1. "The Little Work Group!"; 2. "I Want To Be A Full-Fledged Platelet Soon!"; 3. "Mini-Rangers, Move Out!"; 4. "Tale of the Tumbling Coagulant Canister"; 5. "Don't Call Me A Baby!"; 6. "We've Been Invited!"
2	June 9, 2020	978-4-06-519798-1	October 27, 2020	978-1-64659-420-7
7. "Traveling 3,000 Leagues To Deliver A Letter"; 8. "Being Myself"; 9. "Break Time Under the Tree"; 10. "The Platelets' Exciting 24 Hours!"; 11. "For the Sake of What We Must Protect"; 12. "A Thrilling Tour of the Small Intestine"
3	December 9, 2020	978-4-06-521697-2	July 20, 2021	978-1-63699-229-7
13. "Leader and Vice Leader At Odds"; 14. "Tough Mud Balls"; 15. "A Moment of Emptiness"; 16. "The Way of the Adults"; 17. "Anywhere But Here"; 18. "Pool Duty"
4	June 9, 2021	978-4-06-521697-2	November 16, 2021	978-1-63699-468-0
19. "What I Want To Be"; 20. "A Warm Place"; 21. "Exciting Chekups"; 22. "The Master Trainer's Secret"; 23. "Will That Rare Card Come?"; 24. "JJ Channel"; Final- "Platelets at Work"

=== Cells at Work!: Baby! ===
Cells at Work!: Baby! (はたらく細胞BABY) by Yasuhiro Fukuda. It follows a group of cells inside a baby's body, 40 weeks after conception and close to delivery, with the cells unaware of anything. It was serialized in Morning from October 17, 2019, to October 7, 2021.

No.	Original release date	Original ISBN	English release date	English ISBN
1	January 9, 2020	978-4-06-518231-4	July 21, 2020	978-1-64659-555-6
1. "Birth (Part One)"; 2. "Birth (Part Two)"; 3. "Pulmonary Circulation"; 4. "Mother's Milk"; 5. "Norovirus"; 6. "Heat Rash"; 7. "Immunity"
2	July 20, 2020	978-4-06-519640-3	November 24, 2020	978-1-64659-820-5
5. "Bump"; 6. "Vaccination"; 7. "F-Niichan"; 8. "RS Virus (Part 1)"; 9. "RS Virus (Part 2)"; 10. "RS Virus (Part 3)"; 11. "Feces"; 12. "Choking"
3	February 22, 2021	978-4-06-522344-4	July 13, 2021	978-1-63699-227-3
16. "Pee"; 17. "Diaper Rash"; 18. "Growing"; 19. "IgG"; 20. "Teamwork"; Bonus 1. "The Promise"; Bonus 2. ""Niichan""
4	October 21, 2021	978-4-06-524975-8	May 31, 2022	978-1-64651-303-1
Bonus- "First Encounter"; 21. "Food Allergies (Part 1)"; 22. "Food Allergies (Part 2)"; 23. "Selfish"; 24. "Nowhere In This Body"; 25. "I Hate Him"; Final- "Senpai"

=== Cells at Work!: Lady! ===
Cells at Work!: Lady! (はたらく細胞LADY), written by Harada and illustrated by Akari Otokawa. It is focused on cells in the body of an adult woman. It started in Morning Two on January 22, 2020. The magazine ceased print publication and moved to a digital starting on August 4, 2022. The series finished on September 26, 2022.

No.	Original release date	Original ISBN	English release date	English ISBN
1	July 20, 2020	978-4-06-519908-4	September 12, 2023	979-8-88933-065-3
2	February 22, 2021	978-4-06-521937-9	October 10, 2023	979-8-88933-066-0
3	June 23, 2021	978-4-06-523599-7	November 14, 2023	979-8-88933-067-7
4	May 23, 2022	978-4-06-528098-0	January 9, 2024	979-8-88933-068-4
5	November 22, 2022	978-4-06-529758-2	March 12, 2024	979-8-88933-130-8

=== Cells at Work!: White Brigade ===
Cells at Work!: White Brigade (はたらく細胞WHITE) by Tetsuji Kanie. It is focused on white blood cells. It was serialized in Monthly Shōnen Sirius from October 26, 2020, to July 26, 2022.

No.	Original release date	Original ISBN	English release date	English ISBN
1	February 9, 2021	978-4-06-522323-9	November 9, 2021	978-1-63699-458-1
1. "An Admired Superior"; 2. "First Training"; 3. "Rival"; 4. "Let's Phagocytize!"; 5. "Lost Myelocyte"; 6. "A Scratch"; Special Bonus
2	September 9, 2021	978-4-06-524873-7	January 11, 2022	978-1-63699-558-8
7. "Teatime With Everyone"; 8. "Enhance Your Image!"; 9. "Field Trip in the Intestines"; 10. "Physical Fitness Test With Everyone"; 11. "A Bit of Rest and Relaxation"; Special Bonus
3	March 9, 2022	978-4-06-527028-8	September 27, 2022	978-1-68491-498-2
12. "Portrait Battle"; 13. "Heatstroke"; 14. "Super-Secret (?) Training!"; 15. "Pseudomonas Aeruginosa's Counterattack"; 16. "White Blood Cell Observation Journal"; 17. "Intern"; Special Bonus Chapter
4	October 7, 2022	978-4-06-529454-3	March 28, 2023	978-1-68491-861-4
18. "The Backs of My Seniors"; 19. "Two Band Cells"; 20. "Training Camp Starts!: 21. "Test of Courage Rally"; 22. "Sudden Debut?!"; 23. "An Ordeal"; Final- "Band Cell at Work"; Special Bonus Chapter

=== Cells at Work!: Neo Bacteria! ===
Cells at Work! Neo Bacteria (はたらく細菌Neo) by Haruyuki Yoshida. It is a sequel to Cells at Work!: Bacteria! and was serialized in Nakayoshi and on the Palcy manga app from December 28, 2020, to February 22, 2021.

No.	Original release date	Original ISBN	English release date	English ISBN
1	February 22, 2021	978-4-06-522665-0	November 2, 2021	978-1-63699-452-9
1. "The Gut Bacteria and the Host In Love"; 2. "Staphylococcus Epidermidis Is the Ally of the Skin"; 3. "Standing In Solidarity To Finish Off Viruses"

=== Cells at Work!: Illegal ===
Cells at Work!: Illegal (はたらく細胞イリーガル) by Kae Hashimoto. It is focused on the cells of a person taking illegal substances. It was serialized on the YanMaga Web digital manga platform from February 1, 2022, to July 18, 2023.

No.	Japan release date	Japan ISBN
1	June 20, 2022	978-4-06-528141-3
2	November 18, 2022	978-4-06-529754-4
3	May 18, 2023	978-4-06-531694-8
4	September 20, 2023	978-4-06-533038-8

=== Cells at Work!: Muscle ===
Cells at Work! Muscle (はたらく細胞マッスル) by Yū Maeda. It is focused on muscles in the human body. It was serialized on the Morning Two manga website from February 16, 2023, to February 20, 2025.

No.	Japan release date	Japan ISBN
1	July 21, 2023	978-4-06-532422-6
2	November 22, 2023	978-4-06-533296-2
3	April 23, 2024	978-4-06-535283-0
4	October 22, 2024	978-4-06-537193-0
5	May 22, 2025	978-4-06-539334-5

=== Cells at Work! Cat ===
Cells at Work! Cat (はたらく細胞 猫), written by Choco Aozora and illustrated by Meku Kaire. It is centered around cells in the body of a cat. It was serialized in Monthly Shōnen Sirius from May 25, 2023, to March 26, 2026.

No.	Japan release date	Japan ISBN
1	January 9, 2024	978-4-06-534273-2
2	July 9, 2024	978-4-06-535744-6
3	December 9, 2024	978-4-06-537705-5
4	July 9, 2025	978-4-06-539927-9
5	May 8, 2026	978-4-06-541336-4

=== Cells at Work!: Medicine ===
Cells at Work!: Medicine (はたらく細胞 おくすり), written by Koma Warita and illustrated by Ryō Kuji. It is centered around medicine. It was serialized in Monthly Shōnen Sirius from May 25, 2023, to May 26, 2025.

No.	Japan release date	Japan ISBN
1	January 9, 2024	978-4-06-534274-9
2	July 9, 2024	978-4-06-535746-0
3	November 8, 2024	978-4-06-537403-0
4	July 9, 2025	978-4-06-539347-5
