= One Fine Day (South Korean TV series) =

2006 South Korean TV series

- Promotional poster
- Hangul: 어느 멋진 날
- RR: Eoneu meotjin nal
- MR: Ŏnŭ mŏtchin nal
- Genre: Romance; Melodrama
- Written by: Son Eun-hye
- Directed by: Shin Hyun-chang
- Starring: Gong Yoo; Sung Yu-ri; Namkoong Min; Lee Yeon-hee
- Music by: Seo Seung-won
- Country of origin: South Korea
- Original language: Korean
- No. of episodes: 16

Production
- Producer: Yoon Jae-moon
- Production locations: South Korea; Sydney, Australia

Original release
- Network: Munhwa Broadcasting Corporation
- Release: May 31 – July 20, 2006

One Fine Day (Korean: 어느 멋진 날) is a 2006 South Korean television drama series starring Gong Yoo, Sung Yu-ri, Namkoong Min and Lee Yeon-hee. Originally set to be a faithful adapted of the manga series Flower of Eden by author Yuki Suetsugu, the series was rewritten following plagiarism accusations against the author. The series aired on MBC from May 31 to July 20, 2006, on Wednesdays and Thursdays at 21:55 for 16 episodes.

== Plot ==
Although not related by blood, Seo Gun (Gong Yoo) and Seo Ha-neul (Sung Yu-ri) are legally siblings after the marriage of Gun's father and Ha-neul's mother. But after the deaths of their parents, the siblings are sent to an orphanage where they tearfully part once they get adopted into different families.

In Korea, Ha-neul is a given a new name, Park Hae-won, and grows up in a wealthy, loving family, so much so that she finds it suffocating. Her adoptive mother (Sunwoo Eun-sook) treats Ha-neul like her dead biological daughter, while her adoptive brother Park Tae-won (Yoo Ha-joon) is obsessed with her.

In Australia, Gun lives a life of destitution with his adoptive father Goo Kyung-taek (Lee Ki-yeol) and adoptive sister Goo Hyo-joo (Lee Yeon-hee). He becomes a small-time gangster whose main talents are swindling and fighting. When he hears from his best friend Goo Sung-chan (Kang Sung-jin) that his sister Ha-neul was adopted by a rich family and is now living like a princess, he decides to return to his native country in order to con Ha-neul into giving him money. Hyo-joo, who's nursed a crush on him for a long time, follows Gun to Korea.

Meanwhile, Ha-neul lives every day wanting to get away from her adoptive parents and brother. She secretly works at an aquarium and constantly gets into quarrels with the curator, Kang Dong-ha (Namkoong Min), who starts to like her. Then one day, Gun suddenly appears in front of her. She'd never forgotten him and like she'd imagined a million times in her dreams, her "real" brother has come back to get her, just as he'd promised. Now worlds apart from each other, they reunite after 15 years of separation. Gun initially just wants to swindle money from Ha-neul, but he can't help protecting and caring for his little sister. As the two grow closer, their relationship and feelings become more complicated, and they come to realize that their mutual affection is something more than that of a brother and a sister.

== Cast ==
=== Main characters ===
- Gong Yoo as Seo Gun
- Sung Yu-ri as Seo Ha-neul / Park Hae-won
  - Seo Ji-hee as young Ha-neul
- Namkoong Min as Kang Dong-ha
- Lee Yeon-hee as Goo Hyo-joo

=== Supporting characters ===
- Kang Sung-jin as Goo Sung-chan / James (Gun's friend)
- Lee Ki-yeol as Goo Kyung-taek (Gun's adoptive father)
- Jung Dong-hwan as Park Jin-kwon (Ha-neul's adoptive father)
- Sunwoo Eun-sook as Ji Soo-hyun (Ha-neul's adoptive mother)
- Yoo Ha-joon as Park Tae-won (Ha-neul's adoptive brother)
- Ahn Yeon-hong as Kim Mal-ja (Ha-neul's friend)
- Lee Sa-bi as Choi Sun-kyung (Ha-neul's friend)
- Lee Jeong-ho
- Yoon Yong-hyun
- Woo Hee-jin

== Reception ==
One Fine Day received average viewership ratings of less than 10%.

== International broadcast ==
- Due to Gong Yoo's rising popularity in Japan after Coffee Prince, One Fine Day aired on Fuji TV beginning October 4, 2010.
- It aired in Vietnam on HTV9 from January 30, 2007.
- It aired in Indonesia on Indosiar from April 23, 2007.
