= You're My Cutie!! =

Japanese manga series

- First tankōbon volume cover

カワイイなんて聞いてない!! (Kawaii Nante Kiitenai!!)
- Genre: Romantic comedy
- Manga
- Written by: Nakaba Harufuji
- Published by: Kodansha
- English publisher: NA: Kodansha USA
- Imprint: Kodansha Comics Betsufure
- Magazine: Bessatsu Friend
- Original run: June 12, 2020 – present
- Volumes: 10

You're My Cutie!! (カワイイなんて聞いてない!!, Kawaii Nante Kiitenai!!) is a Japanese manga series written and illustrated by Nakaba Harufuji. It began serialization in Kodansha's shōjo manga magazine Bessatsu Friend in June 2020.

== Synopsis ==
High school student Madoka Kawahara enjoys reading manga, especially shōjo series where cute boys fall in love with older girls. Although she doesn't expect to actually meet such a boy in her life, one arrives in the form of Shikura Momoki as a temporary worker at her parents' small restaurant. Since her brother went to university, Madoka has had to help out a lot, and they need extra help. Her joy is short-lived, however, as the first-year high school student is rude and distrustful towards her. When another student visits the restaurant, Madoka notices how Shikura is treated like a pretty object and secretly photographed. She begins to understand why he is so aloof and helps him stop the harassment. Madoka wants to show him that not all girls are so superficial.

== Publication ==
Written and illustrated by Nakaba Harufuji, You're My Cutie began serialization in Kodansha's shōjo manga magazine Bessatsu Friend on June 12, 2020. Its chapters have been collected into ten tankōbon volumes as of April 2025. The series is licensed digitally in English by Kodansha USA.

No.	Original release date	Original ISBN	North American release date	North American ISBN
1	January 13, 2021	978-4-06-522042-9	September 21, 2021	978-1-63-699361-4
1. "Shikura-kun's Jagged Heart"; 2. "Shikura-kun at a Distance"; 3. "Friends with Shikura-kun"; 4. "A Surprise for Shikura-kun"
2	June 11, 2021	978-4-06-523564-5	October 19, 2021	978-1-63-699418-5
5. "Confessing to Shikura-kun"; 6. "Shikura-kun as Usual"; 7. "Fireworks with Shikura-kun"; 8. "Approaching Shikura-kun"
3	October 13, 2021	978-4-06-525117-1	March 15, 2022	978-1-63-699657-8
9. "Shikura-kun's Answer"; 10. "Messages from Shikura-kun"; 11. "Shikura Stop"; 12. "A Date with Shikura-kun"
4	March 11, 2022	978-4-06-527139-1	November 22, 2022	978-1-68-491492-0
13. "Dazzling Shikura-kun"; 14. "Shikura-kun's Jealously"; 15. "Shikura-kun and the Hair Dryer"; 16. "Shikura-kun's Coming Out"
5	August 12, 2022	978-4-06-528854-2	February 21, 2023	978-1-68-491711-2
17. "A Present for Shikura-kun"; 18. "Shikura-kun's Acts"; 19. "An Invitation from Shikura-kun"; 20. "Go, Shikura-kun!"
6	February 13, 2023	978-4-06-530696-3	June 18, 2023	979-8-88-933044-8
21. "Battling Shikura-kun"; 22. "Shikura-kun Dash"; 23. "Shikura-kun at Home"; 24. "Doubting Shikura-kun"
7	July 13, 2023	978-4-06-532260-4	January 23, 2024	979-8-88-933335-7
25. "Shikura-kun Worries"; 26. "Shikura-kun's Nervous"; 27. "Christmas with Shikura-kun"; 28. "A Shikura-kun Shortage"
8	January 12, 2024	978-4-06-534040-0	June 25, 2024	979-8-88-933580-1
29. "Shikura-kun's Family"; 30. "Shikura-kun's Hometown"; 31. "Shikura-kun's Friends"; 32. "Shikura-kun's Jealous"
9	June 13, 2024	978-4-06-535876-4	November 19, 2024	979-8-89-478165-5
33. "Valentine's Day with Shikura-kun"; 34. "My First Fight with Shikura-kun?"; 35. "Puppy Shikura-kun"; 36. "Shikura-kun, the Wiz"
10	April 11, 2025	978-4-06-539190-7	September 16, 2025	979-8-89-478525-7
37. "Cooking with Shikura-kun"; 38. "New Shikura-kun"; 39. "Shikura-kun and a Prank"; 40. "Shikura-kun in Return"

== Reception ==
By January 2024, the series had over 1.2 million copies in circulation.
