= Life (manga) =

Japanese manga series and its adaptation

- First tankōbon volume cover, featuring Ayumu Shiiba

ライフ (Raifu)
- Genre: Coming-of-age; Drama
- Manga
- Written by: Keiko Suenobu
- Published by: Kodansha
- English publisher: NA: Tokyopop (expired) Kodansha USA (current)
- Imprint: Kodansha Comics Betsufure; Afternoon KC
- Magazine: Bessatsu Friend
- Original run: April 13, 2002 – February 13, 2009
- Volumes: 20
- Television drama
- Directed by: Masaki Tanimura; Yusuke Kato
- Produced by: Toshiyuki Nakano
- Written by: Rika Nezu
- Music by: Shōgo Kaida; Yamazaki Hirokazu
- Studio: Fuji Television
- Original network: FNS (Fuji TV)
- Original run: June 30, 2007 – September 15, 2007
- Episodes: 11
- Novel

Drama Novel: Life
- Written by: Rika Nezu; Mika
- Illustrated by: Keiko Suenobu
- Published by: Kodansha
- Imprint: KC Novels
- Published: September 5, 2007
- icon

Life (Japanese: ライフ, Hepburn: Raifu) is a Japanese manga series written and illustrated by Keiko Suenobu. It was serialized in Kodansha's shōjo manga magazine Bessatsu Friend from April 2002 to February 2009, with its chapters collected in 20 tankōbon volumes. A live-action drama adaptation aired in Japan on Fuji Television and its affiliates from June to September 2007. A single-volume drama novelization was published with it. A sequel series by Suenobu titled Life 2: Giver/Taker was serialized in Kodansha's seinen manga magazine Monthly Afternoon from June 2016 to October 2018.

In 2006, Life won the Kodansha Manga Award for shōjo manga. By October 2018, the series has over 10 million copies in print.

== Plot ==
Third-year best friends Ayumu Shiiba and Shinozuka promise to each other that when they graduate middle school, they will remain friends. After Ayumu scores higher on the entrance exams than her, Shinozuka breaks off their friendship. Hurt by this betrayal, Ayumu starts self-harming.

Entering her first year of high school, Ayumu keeps to herself, having difficulty fitting in with others around her. There, she is introduced to the popular Manami Anzai and becomes her friend. As Ayumu regains her optimism, she one day discovers Manami attempting suicide after being dumped by her boyfriend, Katsumi Sako. Stopping her in time, Ayumu attempts to mend their relationship by visiting Katsumi's house, where she accidentally uncovers his secret fetish. Ayumu is caught and assaulted by Katsumi, and is later mistaken by Manami and her friends to be stealing Katsumi from her. As Ayumu endures severe bullying from her classmates, she can only turn to an unlikely ally and friend, Miki Hatori, for strength and guidance.

== Characters ==
Ayumu Shiiba (椎葉 歩, Shiiba Ayumu)
Portrayed by: Kie Kitano
A high school student (First Year, Class 2). She studies at Nishidate High School, or Nishikō ('Nishi High'), who consistently struggles on tests despite being very intelligent. She lives with her single middle-class mother and younger sister, Akane, in a company house but her father is never present (in the television drama, Ayumu has a younger brother named Makoto, their mother's name is Fumiko and her father "is always out of town on business trips"); her family does not pay much attention to her until Volume 19 of the manga, when she is hospitalized due to the stabbing incident. After the end of her friendship with Shii-chan at the very end of middle school, she has difficulties fitting into high school life and resorts to self-harm in order to cope and relieve stress—in Volume 5 of the manga, she has 19 cuts. Manami is her first friend at Nishikō (it appears that she is afraid of Manami because Manami gets angry with her when she talks to other girls in the class) but their friendship does not last long (until Volume 4)—Manami and her group start to bully her because they think she is trying to steal Katsumi from Manami. When Ayumu tells the truth about Katsumi's real self as well as Manami's bullying and involvement with Akira, no one believes her except Miki and Yūki. Despite many hardships, including Manami's bullying, Katsumi's stalking and molestation, Akira's abusive behaviors, and the teachers' and family's passiveness, her friendship with Miki and Yūki's support give her the strength she needs to stand up for herself, to stop self-harming, and to become a stronger and more confident person. In Volume 15 of the manga, the truth finally comes out but she is not satisfied until she understands Manami's feelings and thoughts as well as Manami's wish to live on, although they cause Ayumu to get stabbed by Manami and, thus, hospitalized. After shortly meeting with Manami, she reports all Manami's bad deeds to the police and continues to live on.
Miki Hatori (羽鳥 未来, Hatori Miki)
Portrayed by: Megumi Seki
A girl in Ayumu's class at Nishikō, later also Ayumu's friend. Strikingly beautiful and independent, she is usually the top student of her school, and has a quiet willpower and strength. She can relate to what Ayumu is going through—she is also a victim of Manami and her group but, unlike Ayumu, she does not let it bother her, at least outwardly. She has been known to work multiple jobs, such as working behind the counter at the risqué Rainbow Café and being a bunny girl at clubs (in the TV drama, she only works at Rainbow Café, and her being a bunny girl is only hinted at), therefore, most of the time she is not at school. Like most of her classmates, Miki is about fifteen or sixteen, but she stretches the truth when trying to find work, saying instead that she is nineteen. She lives with her father, Tsurayuku, but most of the time he is hospitalized due to his heart disease; after her parents' divorce, she never sees her mother. At the age of 6, she lived with her grandfather, a cabinet maker, and his apprentices but then she moved out with her father—it is revealed in Volume 12 of the manga, when the girls go to visit Miki's grandfather for the summer vacation. She is always a good friend to Ayumu by helping her out, comforting her, and cheering her up (she is one of the few students who does not bully Ayumu); Ayumu is the first one to ask her to be friends. In Volume 15 of the manga, Ms. Toda frames Miki in cheating during exams (as part of Manami's request) but no one in the class believes that (this causes the truth about Manami to come out) and she is not punished. In Volume 19 of the manga, while visiting Ayumu in the hospital, her father's doctor suggests Miki to leave because her father needs to get a surgery so she decides to move and transfer school. Before leaving, she spends a great day with Ayumu and Yūki.
Yūki Sonoda (薗田 優樹, Sonoda Yūki)
Portrayed by: Takahiro Hōjō
A guy in Ayumu's class at Nishikō, later also Ayumu's and Miki's friend. He first appears in Volume 6 of the manga after bumping into Ayumu, where he immediately notices she is distressed. When Manami and her group are trying to take Ayumu into the bathroom (likely to torment her), Yūki along with other guys from the same class stops them and tells them off. He reveals to her his own bullying experiences in Tatsuki Middle School, including being stripped and beaten by his classmates, events which lead him to stand up for Ayumu, though he insists that he is trying to erase his own pain not because of her sake. Afterwards, he is always helping Ayumu out when in trouble. In Volume 7 of the manga, it is revealed that Akira was his main tormentor and Yūki transferred school to avoid the bully. Despite his past experiences, he overall has a gentle and kind nature.
Manami Anzai (安西 愛海, Anzai Manami)
Portrayed by: Saki Fukuda
Ayumu's first friend, later ex-friend, at Nishikō. She is extremely manipulative and spoiled; as the daughter of a rich CEO (and possible future mayor), she uses her powers, charisma and conceit to force others to do her will, also by blackmail, threats or sexual favors. Her manipulations allow her to use emotions as a weapon; she appears the "innocent good girl" (in front of teachers, her parents, or other people of authority), the martyr (when her bullying draws the attention of other classmates and teachers), or the predator (when tormenting others). People tend to take her side because of how she conducts herself in confrontational situations. She is obsessed with her boyfriend Katsumi (during their first break-up she becomes suicidal but Ayumu saves her)—it is revealed that she was bullied in middle school when dating Katsumi, nevertheless, she likes to bully anyone who deserves it, betrays her or stands up to her. At first, she and her group, including Ayumu, bullies Miki because she is into "some pretty bad stuff". However, she later turns all classmates (except Miki and Yūki) against Ayumu for a misunderstanding, in which Katsumi breaks up with her and starts to pursue Ayumu, although he tells Manami that "Ayumu is pursuing him". After an incident where Ayumu destroys Katsumi's cellphone, Manami gets angry with Katsumi because she thinks he is defending Ayumu, but they soon make up. She uses Akira to do all her dirty work, e.g. getting revenge on Katsumi (she feels betrayed because he wants to break up with her) and Ayumu. She also lies to her parents that she is being bullied by Ayumu and Miki causing her father to show up at school and forces Hiro to tell the school that Hiro is the bully (so Manami will not bully Hiro anymore for almost telling the truth to Ayumu). Since Hirose's attempted suicide, all her classmates thinks (but speaks out only in Volume 15 of the manga) that she is the culprit of everything (Ayumu's bullying, Hirose's attempted suicide and lie, Ms. Hiraoka's transfer, and Miki's cheat sheet), thus, they start to ignore her. All her bad deeds, including her true colors, are then known to the whole school so she escapes to Katsumi's home, thinking him as her only ally. Here, Manami explains Ayumu the truth behind their friendship (she approached Ayumu because Ayumu wasn't ugly and should have been her follower without questioning or opposing her), her involvement with the hospital incident and her intentions of killing Ayumu with a knife (she hates Ayumu because Ayumu opposes her, thus, she cannot let her live happily) but she stops when she discovers Katsumi's scrapbook. After hearing the truth from Katsumi, she stabs him in the back and she then stabs herself in the stomach. Before giving herself a mortal wound, Ayumu stops her; living is her punishment to redeem herself. In the hospital, Manami reveals her father her true real self and seeks Ayumu out because she wants to be reported to the police. In the end, she is in a reformatory.
Katsumi Sako (佐古 克己, Sako Katsumi)
Portrayed by: Yoshihiko Hosoda
Manami's boyfriend. Around large groups of people he acts as a polite and sweet student with good grades; but his real self is manipulative and abusive. He has a fetish for bondage and keeps a scrapbook of the girls he turns into his slaves. This scrapbook is casually discovered by Ayumu, when she tries to convince him to get back together with Manami during their first break up. As a result of that, he wants to forcefully make her his slave, so he molests her, blackmails her (about her self-harm secret and nude photos taken with his cellphone), stalks her, and even completely tricks Ayumu's mother into thinking he is a nice person when hired as Ayumu's tutor. Early in the series, it is revealed that he did not enter Nishikō of his own free will—his father had made him enroll because Manami, who was good for the reputation of the Sako name, would be a student there; the relationship he and Manami began at Tatsuki Middle School have been caused by their fathers. Because of this, Katsumi breaks up with Manami but soon his father forces him to end his "relationship" with Ayumu and get back together with Manami for business purposes. While they get back together, Katsumi becomes a target of Akira who is following Manami's request (in the drama, he is explicitly going out with Ms. Toda). At first, he is beaten and robbed by Akira but later Akira extorts money from him, otherwise he would divulge his secret about forcefully dating Manami. He starts dating Ms. Toda but are seen by Manami's group, thus, Manami breaks up with him. After Ms. Toda's resignation and Manami's exposed true colors, he accidentally sets the fire alarm off so everyone, including Manami, thinks he wants to help her. At home, he sees Manami and Ayumu who discover his scrapbook so he finally tells Manami the truth about his fetish and his feelings (he never liked her). As a consequence, he is stabbed in the back by Manami and runs from the house. In the hospital, his father gets angry at Katsumi after learning the truth about his fetish and the end of his relationship with Manami which causes him to be "out of business" but, at the same time, Katsumi gets angry with him because he thinks of being only a tool for his father. In the end, Katsumi is last seen in the bedroom crying and holding a picture of his classmates.
Wakae Toda (戸田 和佳絵, Toda Wakae; also known as Ms. Toda (Toda-sensei))
Portrayed by: Asaka Seto
Ayumu's homeroom teacher at Nishikō. She has a "peace at any price" principle, leading her to deny Ayumu's declaration of teasing by passing it off as "Ayumu's fault" (Volume 6 of the manga). She is shown as very sympathetic towards Katsumi and Manami. During summer vacation, Ms. Toda starts dating Katsumi and is seen kissing him on a beach by Manami's group. When she is found out by Manami, she promises Manami to help her to get rid of Miki in exchange of her silence. Her actions, however, backfire and Manami blackmails her with the beach photo but Ms. Toda decides to speak the truth. As a result of that, she is forced to resign but teaches somewhere else. In the drama, she dates Katsumi; to keep anyone else from finding out (save for Manami, who had already figured it out), she frames Ayumu by blaming her for all the bullying that goes on at Nishikō, even though they "both" know full well that Ayumu is the victim, rather than the one behind it.
Masako Hiraoka (平岡 正子, Hiraoka Masako; also known as Ms. Hiraoka (Hiraoka-sensei))
Portrayed by: Miki Sakai
Assistant teacher of Ayumu's class at Nishikō. She is the only non-corrupt teacher who seeks the truth about all this bullying situation because she does not believe that Hirose is the culprit. After questioning around, she finds out that Manami's guilty. She is forcefully transferred to Yugen High School, an all boys' school, thanks to Manami's father. she is sorry that she couldn't help Ayumu. In the end, she is a fine and strict teacher at Yugenkō.
Akira Karino (狩野 アキラ, Karino Akira)
Portrayed by: Kazuma Yamane
Student at Asakuma High School (it appears that this school does not have a good reputation). He first appears in Volume 5 of the manga—while hanging out with Miki, Ayumu falls over a beer bottle belonging to someone from Akira's group so Miki wants to revenge her friend and smashes it right where they are sitting; because of Miki's actions, they want revenge so they unsuccessfully rape them in a karaoke booth. He is depicted as a delinquent who is in love with Manami. In exchange of sex, Akira does whatever Manami asks him regarding Katsumi (as in assaulting, robbing, extorting money from and blackmailing him) but also Ayumu and Miki (as in kidnapping as well as almost raping and killing them). After the incident at the abandoned hospital (Ayumu and Miki were kidnapped by Akira and his group but Yūki saved them after winning a fight with Akira who fell from a window), Akira tells Manami that he'll stay quiet and wait for her before running away but she soon reports him to the police and is taken into custody.

Manami's group: Girls in Ayumu's class at Nishikō. Their names are revealed only in Volume 9: Hirose (or Hiro-chan), Emi, Chika and Iwamoto (or Iwa-chan). They go in the same class as Manami, Ayumu, Miki and Yūki, and are Manami's friends. They are so manipulated by Manami's behavior and actions that they believe whatever Manami says, therefore, they'll do whatever it takes to protect Manami, e.g. bullying Miki or Ayumu. However, Hiro discovers Manami's plot against Katsumi and Ayumu (Volume 9 of the manga) but ends in hospital for attempted suicide and is forced to lie that she is the culprit of the bullying situation in exchange of being forgiven by Manami; due to this reason she is expelled (until Volume 20 of the manga). After Hiro's attempted suicide, Iwa gets scared so she decides to distance herself from Manami (Volume 12 of the manga) and transfer school to Kyushu. Emi and Chika also start to see Manami's true colors but they speak out only after the incident with Miki's cheat sheet, thus, they start to ignore Manami. After the stabbing incident, Emi is the only one who is brave enough to explain to the teachers and Manami's father about the whole bullying situation because she wants to redeem herself.

Yūko Shinozuka (篠塚 夕子, Shinozuka Yūko)
Portrayed by: Akane Osawa
Ayumu's ex-best friend from Saku Radani Middle School. Her surname is Shinozuka, which is why Ayumu calls her "Shii-chan" (しーちゃん). Her given name is never mentioned in the manga; it is Yūko in the TV drama. She had promised Ayumu that even if they went to different high schools, they would still be friends. At the top of her class, she dreamed of getting into Nishidate to be like a girl who used to live next door to her. However, her grades began to slip due to tutoring Ayumu instead of focusing on her own schoolwork. Eventually Ayumu began scoring higher on her final exams, but lied about it in order to make Shii-chan feel better. Her dreams are shattered when the entrance exam results are posted and her grades are too low to make it into Nishidate. When she discovers the truth, she blames Ayumu and angrily breaks off their friendship despite the promise she had made. It is her broken friendship with Shii-chan that drives Ayumu to begin cutting.

== Media ==
=== Manga ===
Written and illustrated by Keiko Suenobu, Life was serialized in Kodansha's shōjo manga magazine Bessatsu Friend starting in April 2002, in that year's May issue. It concluded serialization on February 13, 2009, in that year's March issue. Kodansha collected its chapters in twenty tankōbon volumes under its "Kodansha Comics Betsufure" imprint, released between August 9, 2002, and April 13, 2009. Kodansha later reprinted the chapters in thirteen volumes under its "Afternoon KC" imprint, released between June 23 and November 22, 2016.

The English-language version of the manga was originally published by Tokyopop, with the first volume releasing on April 11, 2006. At first rated OT (Older Teen; 16+), starting with the release of sixth volume and carrying over to future reprintings of the previous five, the rating was changed to M (Mature; 18+) for explicit content. The tenth volume was scheduled for a September 2008 release, but on August 31, 2009, Tokyopop announced that their manga licensing contracts with Kodansha had expired, leaving Life unfinished. In 2023, Kodansha USA announced that they have licensed the series for digital release in English, releasing the entire series in twenty volumes from March 7, 2023, to November 5, 2024.

Suenobu created a sequel to the manga titled Life 2: Giver/Taker (ライフ2 ギバーテイカー, Raifu Tsū: Gibā Teikā), which was serialized in Kodansha's seinen manga magazine Monthly Afternoon from June 25, 2016, to October 25, 2018.

==== Volumes ====
No.	Original release date	Original ISBN	English release date	English ISBN
1	August 9, 2002	978-4-06-341296-3	April 11, 2006 (Tokyopop); March 7, 2023 (digital)	978-1-59532-931-8 (Tokyopop); 978-1-68491-571-2 (digital)
1. "Self-Punishment" (自罰, Ji Batsu); 2. "Occlusion" (閉塞, Heisoku); 3. "Promise" (約束, Yakusoku)
2	December 13, 2002	978-4-06-341315-1	August 8, 2006 (Tokyopop); April 4, 2023 (digital)	978-1-59532-932-5 (Tokyopop); 978-1-68491-575-0 (digital)
4. "Cooperation" (協力, Kyōryoku); 5. "Secret" (秘密, Himitsu); 6. "Binding Spell" (呪縛, Jubaku); 7. "Doubt" (疑惑, Giwaku)
3	April 11, 2003	978-4-06-341332-8	December 12, 2006 (Tokyopop); May 2, 2023 (digital)	978-1-59532-933-2 (Tokyopop); 978-1-68491-627-6 (digital)
8. "Change" (変化, Henka); 9. "Wandering" (迷走, Meisō); 10. "Harbinger" (前兆, Zenchō); 11. "Resolution" (決心, Ketsushin)
4	July 11, 2003	978-4-06-341343-4	March 13, 2007 (Tokyopop); June 6, 2023 (digital)	978-1-59532-934-9 (Tokyopop); 978-1-68491-688-7 (digital)
12. "Suspicion" (不信, Fushin); 13. "Target" (標的, Hyōteki); 14. "Solitude" (孤立, Koritsu); 15. "Obstacle" (障壁, Shōheki)
5	December 12, 2003	978-4-06-341363-2	June 12, 2007 (Tokyopop); July 4, 2023 (digital)	978-1-59532-935-6 (Tokyopop); 979-8-88933-024-0 (digital)
16. "Darkness" (暗闇, Kurayami); 17. "Confession" (告白, Kokuhaku); 18. "Tomorrow" (明日, Ashita); 19. "One Step" (一歩, Ippo)
6	April 13, 2004	978-4-06-341381-6	September 11, 2007 (Tokyopop); August 1, 2023 (digital)	978-1-59532-936-3 (Tokyopop); 979-8-88933-088-2 (digital)
20. "Reality" (現実, Genjitsu); 21. "Appearances" (体裁, Teisai); 22. "Friend" (友達, Tomodachi); 23. "Ally" (味方, Mikata)
7	August 11, 2004	978-4-06-341394-6	December 11, 2007 (Tokyopop); September 5, 2023 (digital)	978-1-59532-937-0 (Tokyopop); 979-8-88933-135-3 (digital)
24. "Tragedy" (悲劇, Higeki); 25. "Ominous Premonition" (暗雲, Anun); 26. "Absolute Terror" (戦慄, Senritsu); 27. "Supporting Light" (光明, Kōmyō)
8	December 13, 2004	978-4-06-341410-3	March 11, 2008 (Tokyopop); October 3, 2023 (digital)	978-1-59816-195-3 (Tokyopop); 979-8-88933-176-6 (digital)
28. "Predicament" (窮地, Kyūchi); 29. "Cruelty" (非情, Hijō); 30. "No Matter What" (絶対, Zettai); 31. "Determination" (覚悟, Kakugo)
9	April 13, 2005	978-4-06-341422-6	June 10, 2008 (Tokyopop); November 7, 2023 (digital)	978-1-59816-196-0 (Tokyopop); 979-8-88933-261-9 (digital)
32. "Rebirth" (再生, Saisei); 33. "Manipulator" (黒幕, Kuromaku); 34. "Despicable" (卑劣, Hiretsu); 35. "Actress" (役者, Yakusha)
10	July 13, 2005	978-4-06-341433-2	December 5, 2023 (digital)	979-8-88933-283-1 (digital)
36. "Intrigue" (陰謀, Inbō); 37. "Pressure" (圧力, Atsuryoku); 38. "Confession" (告白, Kokuhaku); 39. "Truth" (真実, Shinjitsu)
11	December 13, 2005	978-4-06-341457-8	January 2, 2024 (digital)	979-8-88933-315-9 (digital)
40. "Ripples" (波紋, Hamon); 41. "Participants" (面子(メンツ), Mentsu); 42. "Chaos" (混乱, Konran); 43. "Testimony" (証言, Shōgen)
12	April 13, 2006	978-4-06-341466-0	February 6, 2024 (digital)	979-8-88933-368-5 (digital)
44. "Face-Off" (対面, Taimen); 45. "Hometown" (故郷, Furusato); 46. "True Feelings" (本音, Honne); 47. "Scheming" (秘策, Hisaku)
13	September 13, 2006	978-4-06-341487-5	March 5, 2024 (digital)	979-8-88933-404-0 (digital)
48. "Gallant Figure" (勇姿, Yūshi); 49. "Prediction" (予言, Yogen); 50. "Regret" (無念, Munen); 51. "Loss" (喪失, Sōshitsu)
14	January 12, 2007	978-4-06-341505-6	May 7, 2024 (digital)	979-8-88933-430-9 (digital)
52. "Existence" (存在, Sonzai); 53. "Reminiscence" (追憶, Tsuioku); 54. "In the Act" (術中, Jucchū); 55. "Eruption" (噴出, Funshutsu)
15	May 11, 2007	978-4-06-341523-0	June 4, 2024 (digital)	979-8-88933-431-6 (digital)
56. "Hope" (希望, Kibō); 57. "Connection" (連鎖, Rensa); 58. "Tunnel Vision" (節穴, Fushiana); 59. "Trajectory" (起動, Kidō)
16	September 13, 2007	978-4-06-341542-1	July 2, 2024 (digital)	979-8-88933-616-7 (digital)
60. "Sprouting" (萌芽, Hōga); 61. "Future" (未来, Mirai); 62. "Raging Stream" (激流, Gekiryū); 63. "Roar" (怒号, Dogō)
17	February 13, 2008	978-4-06-341564-3	August 6, 2024 (digital)	979-8-88933-689-1 (digital)
64. "Hell" (地獄, Jigoku); 65. "Disappearance" (疾走, Shissō); 66. "Origin" (原点, Genten); 67. "Elimination" (対峙, Taiji)
18	June 13, 2008	978-4-06-341579-7	September 3, 2024 (digital)	979-8-89478-006-1 (digital)
68. "Final Clash" (決戦, Kessen); 69. "Discovery" (発覚, Hakkaku); 70. "Despair" (絶望, Zetsubō); 71. "Existence" (生命, Seimei)
19	December 12, 2008	978-4-06-341601-5	October 1, 2024 (digital)	979-8-89478-098-6 (digital)
72. "Scars" (傷跡, Kizuato); 73. "Self-Condemnation" (自責, Jiseki); 74. "Declaration" (宣告, Senkoku); 75. "Choice" (選択, Sentaku)
20	April 13, 2009	978-4-06-341617-6	November 5, 2024 (digital)	979-8-89478-155-6 (digital)
76. "Scandal" (事件, Jiken); 77. "Volition" (決断, Ketsudan); 78. "Trusted Friend" (心友, Shinyū); 79. "Journey" (旅路, Tabiji); 80. "Life"

=== Television drama ===
Fuji TV aired a television drama based on the Life manga on June 30, 2007, at 11:10 PM (replacing Liar Game). The eleventh and final episode aired on September 15. Mika Nakashima performed the theme song "Life". A DVD box set of the complete series was released on December 19, 2007.

=== Novel ===
A novelization of the first drama series was published by Kodansha on September 5, 2007 (ISBN 978-4-06-373312-9). Titled Drama Novel: Life (ドラマノベル ライフ, Dorama Noberu: Raifu), it depicted the series' ending a few weeks before the final episode aired. It was co-written by scriptwriter Rika Nezu and Mika, with new illustrations by Keiko Suenobu. It has since become out of print.

== Reception ==
In 2006, Life won the Kodansha Manga Award for the shōjo manga category. By October 2018, the manga series has over 10 million copies in print.
