= The Big Chase: Tokyo SSBC Files =

2025 Japanese television series

- Promotional poster
- 大追跡〜警視庁SSBC強行犯係〜
- Screenplay by: Yasushi Fukuda
- Directed by: Naoki Tamura; Keisuke Toyoshima; Takashi Komatsu
- Starring: Nao Omori; Masaki Aiba; Nao Matsushita; Atsushu Itō; Yuya Takaki (Hey! Say! JUMP); Rika Adachi; Rei Maruyama; Kota Nomura
- Music by: Kan Sawada
- Opening theme: Beacon by Dreams Come True
- Country of origin: Japan
- Original language: Japanese
- No. of seasons: 2
- No. of episodes: 9

Production
- Producers: Fujisaki Emi (TV Asahi); Masayuki Meguro (Toei)
- Production companies: TV Asahi; Toei Company

Original release
- Network: ANN (TV Asahi)
- Release: July 9 – September 3, 2025

The Big Chase: Tokyo SSBC Files (大追跡〜警視庁SSBC強行犯係〜, Daitsuiseki 〜 Keishichō SSBC kyōkōhangakari 〜) is a 2025 Japanese drama television series produced by TV Asahi and Toei Company. The series is head-written by Yasushi Fukuda and features episodes directed by Naoki Tamura, Keisuke Toyoshima and Takashi Komatsu with music by Kan Sawada and stars Nao Omori, Masaki Aiba (Arashi) and Nao Matsushita in the leading roles. The series aired on TV Asahi and its affiliates from July 9 to September 3, 2025.

A special in collaboration with members of the program Zawatsuku! Friday aired on December 31, 2025.

The series' second season was confirmed on June 5, 2026, with Omori, Aiba and Matsushita reprising their roles.

== Plot ==
=== Season 1 ===
Set in the SSBC (Investigation Support and Analysis Center, ISSAC) (捜査支援分析センター, Sousa Shien Bunseki Center), a specialized group within the Metropolitan Police Department founded in 2009, this story focuses on the SSBC's newly established Violent Crimes Unit. This elite team of analysts and investigators is at the forefront of modern policing. As experts in analyzing CCTV, digital forensics, and criminal profiling, their pivotal role in solving a major nationwide robbery, cracking an encrypted communication app to catch the mastermind, catapulted them to fame.The new unit is dedicated to supporting the First Investigative Division in tackling serious crimes like murder, robbery, and arson.

=== Season 2 ===
Nanami returns to the SSBC Violent Crimes Unit after studying in the United States, bringing with him the latest digital investigative techniques, giving a fresh perspective to the team. The relationship between Igaki and Aoyagi, who are former spouses, deepens even further, as does the conflict with the First Investigation Division.

== Cast ==
Main Add. cast 1 Add. cast 2 Add. cast 3

Police

- Shuji Igaki (played by Nao Omori). Former detective in the First Investigative Division. Got into some trouble three years before the story begins and was transferred to mobile analysis in the Violent Crimes Division (VCD) of the Metropolitan Police Department's Criminal Investigation Support and Analysis Center (SSBC), of which he is now in charge of. He is dissatisfied with his chaotic job as a mobile analyst. He becomes Rintaro's trainer following his transfer.
- Rintaro Nanami (played by Masaki Aiba). He is a career officer who was transferred from the National Police Agency to the SSBC VCD, where he works in mobile analysis. After graduating from a top university, he worked for a foreign securities company before passing the mid-career recruitment exam for national civil servants and joining the National Police Agency. His uncle is the former National Police Agency Commissioner General and current Chief Cabinet Secretary. He is single and has never been married.
- Haruka Aoyagi (played by Nao Matsushita). Chief detective of the Metropolitan Police Department's First Investigative Division. Closely involved in investigations with the SSBC Violent Crimes Division, she was transferred from the local precinct to the headquarters in exchange for Igaki, who was transferred to the Violent Crimes Division. Recognized for her excellence and leadership as a detective, she was selected for her current position. She was married to Igaki, divorced four years before the story begins. They have a 13-year-old daughter.
- Osamu Kisawa (played by Atsushi Itō. He is in charge of information analysis at the SSBC Division. An excellent profiling officer at the SSBC Violent Crimes Division. Kizawa's approach is almost game-like; the more cunning the criminal, the more energized he gets.
- Katsuya Oyamada (played by Hey! Say! JUMP's Yuya Takaki. A veteran of the SSBC Violent Crimes Division's mobile analysis unit. He is the athletic type within the typically non-athletic Division.
- Sayaka Mitsumoto (played by Rika Adachi). A tech support specialist on the SSBC team. She's a tech whiz, but also a highly collaborative, sophisticated professional.
- Rumi Nishina (played by Rei Maruyama). Information support specialist in the new SSBC team, her expertise is in security camera image processing and facial recognition. As a returnee from overseas, Nishina sometimes uses English in her reactions. She seems intrigued by the team's new member.
- Shinnosuke Jou (played by Kota Nomura. He is the youngest in the mobile analysis team. A bright and bubbly child–type, he partners with Oyamada.
- Minamoto Shintaro (played by Toshihiro Yashiba}. Member of the Mobile Investigation Unit who frequently works alongside the First Investigative Division and the SSBC Violent Crimes Unit.
- Masao Yaegashi (played by Kenichi Endō). Detective.
- Shigeru Kuzuhara (played by Ken Mitsuishi). Works in the SSBC Violent Crimes Unit with CCTV cameras.

Government

- Shunsuke Kuze (played by Koichi Sato). Current Chief Cabinet Secretary. Rintaro Nanami's uncle.

Press

- Kotone Shimizu (played by Rin Mizushima. A television news reporter

Murderous intent is reflected (Ep. 1)

- Kiryu Satoshi, startup Playverge's founder and president. He was stabbed to death.
- Ryosuke Tamai (played by Shunsuke Nakamura), vice-president of startup Playverge. He narrowly escapes a knife attack, just as CEO Kiryu Satoshi is murdered. Learning of Kiryu's death leaves Tamai completely devastated.
- Koichi Kawase (played by Kenta Hamano), a game programmer who co-founded the company with the late Kiryu. Their falling out, stemming from Kiryu's favoritism towards Vice President Tamai, led to the discovery of Kawase's embezzlement and subsequent firing. Now, he's a key suspect.

Rush Order (Ep. 2)

- Taizo Arakawa (played by Mutsuo Yoshioka, a wanted criminal caught on surveillance camera footage.
- Yukari Hoshino (Ayumi Ito), a woman discovered to be living with Arakawa.
- Ichinose (played by Matsuyuki Orakio), taxi driver that confirms Arakawa and Hoshino's building location.

Reflected truth (Ep. 3)

- Shoko Mochida (played by Naoko Hata), one of the victims, a single mother that was attacked.
- Tatsuya Senba (played by Kazuto Mokudai), suspect in a series of attacks.
- Keiichiro Senba (played by Kanji Yamaguchi), a politician who is secretary-general of the ruling party. Tatsuya Senba's father.

== Episodes ==
=== Season 1 ===
No.	Title	Directed by	Written by	Original release date	Viewers (millions)
1	Satsui wa utsuru (Japanese: 殺意は映る)	Naoki Tamura	Yasushi Fukuda	July 9, 2025	9.7%
Metropolitan police Violent Crimes Division has established SSBC, a support section that investigates technological systems, including security camera footage, data from smartphones and computers, and helps profile suspects. Rintaro Nanami, a newcomer to SSBC's Criminal Investigation Division, is suddenly at the scene of the stabbing of the president of startup company Playvage with his supervisor, Shuji Igaki. At the meeting where investigators are analyzing the data collected, Chief Cabinet Secretary Shunsuke Kuze surprises all present when it is revealed that he is Nanami's uncle.
2	Totsunyū meirei (Japanese: 突入命令)	Keisuke Toshima	Unknown	July 16, 2025	8.6%
Igaki is watching footage from several surveillance cameras, when he detects a wanted criminal. In 2019, Taizo Arakawa planted an explosive device in front of the Ministry of Education, Culture, Sports, Science and Technology in Kasumigaseki, causing one death and five serious injuries. He is wanted for terrorism. Igaki and Nanami go after him, but, after threatening that he had a bomb in his backpack, Arakawa escapes. After a scolding from SSBC's HQ, Igaki and Nanami learn that a woman lives with Arakawa and go after her. HQ continues with the surveillance on Arakawa, while the pair follows the woman, ending in a restaurant. She has a bomb with her.
3	Hansha shita shinjitsu (Japanese: 反射した真実)	Keisuke Toshima	Unknown	July 23, 2025	8.3%
A woman was attacked and falls down stairs. Igaki and Nanami are on site. The investigation reveals that she is a single mother. One of her shoes is gone. This case, which inspires Aoyama to participate, reminds Igaki of similar attacks years before, with the women's shoes removed. The suspect, the son of a politician, was caught on surveillance camera before the crime. However, the team can't find evidence that links the suspect with the previews cases... until they manage to unlock the suspects phone.
4	Hankō yosoku (Japanese: 犯行予測)	Unknown	Unknown	July 30, 2025	N/A
While the SSBC's Violent Crimes Unit is being interviewed by a news program, a series of arson incidents have been appearing around the city. In seven of the cases, the surveilance cameras have been interfered with, while the only available footage is of a slender figure with a hoodie. Kizawa, using geographical profiling, points out on a map the locations of the incidents, noting that all the crimes took place within a circled area. Kizawa guides the team to what they believe is the arsonist's base, to only being deceived, as there is another attack, totally unrelated to the area.
5	11-Byō no kūhaku (Japanese: 11秒の空白)	Unknown	Unknown	August 6, 2025	N/A
A man that looks like Yaegashi appears at SSBC and causes chaos. It is Yaegashi's twin brother, Masahiko, the owner of a restaurant. In the city, a man's corpse is discovered in a river. He is identified as a member of the yakuza, who, previous to his death, apparently had told a hostess that he had found a pianist from a rich family. The SSBC Violent Crimes Unit uses facial recognition technology to identify the "pianist", who turns out to be the man's son, a promising music student. While the team considers him a suspect, they continue investigating and find out that the young man is a twin, and the other man is a member of a semi–criminal group.
6	Yūkai gēmu (Japanese: 誘拐ゲーム)	Unknown	Unknown	August 13, 2025	N/A
While having dinner with former colleagues, Nanami suddenly has a sharp abdominal pain and is taken to the hospital, where he is admitted with acute apendicitis. Meanwhile, a man is killed, with all identificatory items removed, including the dashcam's memory card. Further investigation reveals that the deceased was Morohoshi's president's driver, who had just left the president at the airport. That night, there are a couple of robberies, at a jewelry store and a private home, both of which had contracted a security system from Morohoshi. In the robbery sites, the cameras were not working, and there was no alarm sounding, making Igaki suspicious, ordering an investigation of the coincidences. As First Investigation Division continued with the interrogations regarding possible company-wide involvement, Arakiya, the company's vice-president reveals that the president had been kidnapped.
7	Manatsu no mokugeki-sha (Japanese: 真夏の目撃者)	Unknown	Unknown	August 20, 2025	N/A
A teacher from the school Igaki and Aoyagi's daughter, Misato, goes is found dead. From the security camera footage, it appears that the teacher fell from an upper floor of a building, landing in the pool. The SSBC Violent Crimes Unit begins analizing all the information gathered in the zone, as well as that from the cameras surrounding the school. They also go through the deceased's phone, finding more than 1000 numbers from students, including Misato's. While Nanami tries to calm Igaki and Aoyagi down, Misato reveals that there were rumors that the teacher was involved with "shady characters". As the team continues investigating, they find that the teacher was involved in drug trafficking, the surveillance camera revealing that she had been with the crime group's leader, bowing down in apology.
8	Kieta xxx (Japanese: 消えた×××)	Unknown	Unknown	August 27, 2025	N/A
Igaki is called to where a man has just been shot. The man is a former police officer and his senior. Furthermore, it seems that the gun that he was shot from was police–issued. The team analizes the surveillance camera footage, and Yaegashi finds a man in the footage highly suspicious. Kizawa, who has been monitoring other cameras, spots the suspect near a train station. Igaki questions why the victim was doing in an area not his own, and with someone with a gun. Chief Cabinet Secretary Kuze visits the victim and urges Yaegashi to solve the case. The investigation reveals that the gun used on Kamo, the victim, was also used in a killing over 20 years before. And that it had been stolen from Kamo. Igaki and Aoyagi ask Nanami for a meeting with Kuze, who reveals what his relationship with Kamo is and why he wants the case solved, which could be related to the establishment of the department.
9	Nigekireru to omou na yo (Japanese: 逃げ切れると思うなよ)	Unknown	Unknown	September 3, 2025	N/A
Aoyagi goes on her own to follow a man she suspects is involved in the shooting of ex–officer Kamo, but get hit by him, and then disappears. Misato tells Igaki that she can't contact her mother, so he and Nanami go looking for her. Using information gathered from security camera footage, Igaki and Nanami enter a building where they find an accessory that may belong to Aoyagi. Meanwhile, at the SSBC headquarters, "the man in the red shirt" has been taken in for interrogation. He reveals that he has an alibi, and that Aoyagi may have been kidnapped. Igaki and Nanami use the information from security cameras that reveal some men carrying a wooden box to go rescue Aoyagi, who they believe is inside. Igaki and Nanami discuss the information revealed by Kuze about the establishment of SSBC and the incident from 22 years ago, believing that the leader of a special fraud group and his younger brother are involved.

=== Season 2 ===
No.	Title	Directed by	Written by	Original release date	Viewers (millions)
1	Sukuranburu kōsaten no satsu (Japanese: スクランブル交差点の殺意)	TBA	TBA	July 22, 2026	TBD
The SSBC Violent Crimes Unit, led by Igaki, was busy analyzing security camera footage from a murder case, when Chief of the First Investigation Division, Yaegashi, received a strict order from Chief Cabinet Secretary Kuze to solve the case of the stabbing of politician that just won the East Tokyo mayoral election, changing the priority to the politician's case. Nanami has returned from the United States, where he had gone to study, and goes to SSBC, where his appearance changes the atmosphere in the room. A new incident occurs in Shibuya, making it the third death in a week. It seems that the three cases may be related. Nanami joins Igaki in investigating the apparent coincidences.
2	Hitotsubu no shōko (Japanese: 一粒の証拠)	TBA	TBA	July 29, 2026	TBD
A woman's body has appeared in a river. There are no signs of identification. Neither fingerprints nor facial recognition yield any matches. Yaegashi and Aoyagi inform the team that traces of sleeping pills have been detected in her blood test, suggesting she could have been drugged and tossed into the water. As the investigation continues, they learn that the woman was the victim of a "marriage scam".

== Music ==
On July 2, it was announced that Dreams Come True was in charge of the series' theme song, titled "Beacon".
