= Love Attack! =

Japanese manga series

純愛特攻隊長! (Junai Tokkō Taichō!)
- Genre: Comedy, romance, slice of life
- Manga
- Written by: Shizuru Seino
- Published by: Kodansha
- English publisher: NA: Tokyopop
- Magazine: Bessatsu Friend
- Original run: September 12, 2004 – July 12, 2009
- Volumes: 13

Love Attack! (純愛特攻隊長!, Junai Tokkō Taichō) is a Japanese manga series written and illustrated by Shizuru Seino. It was serialized in the Japanese manga magazine Bessatsu Friend from September 2004 to July 2009 for a total of 13 volumes. The individual chapters were collected and published in tankōbon volumes by Kodansha. As of November 2008, 11 volumes have been released.

The series was licensed for English language release in North America by Tokyopop but the publisher announced via Facebook that "our time with Love Attack! has ended (...)", making the series officially canceled in the U.S..

== Plot ==
High school 1st year Chiemi Yusa often gets into fights while standing up for people being bullied. After getting into too many fights, her teacher threatens to expel her. However, her teacher says that if she can change Akifumi Hirata, the 'Deranged Devil' of the school, who terrifies students and teachers alike, then her record will be wiped clean. She finds him in the middle of a fight with some senpai and, jumping from a second-story window, landing on Ohno and kicks Akifumi in the face, yelling at him to stop doing stupid things in school. Akifumi asks Chiemi out, but she refuses.

As she gets to know him, however, she changes her mind and they begin dating. Yukari, Chiemi's friend, teases them about how slow their relationship is, wondering why Akifumi actually likes Chiemi, while Akifumi's grade school friend, Kuramori Akio, is also in love with Akifumi and doesn't like him dating someone else.

== Characters ==
- Yusa Chiemi (遊佐 千笑): A beautiful high school 1st year who has a strong sense of justice. She often gets into fights, but only to protect other people who are being bullied. In kindergarten, she often protected her cousin, Mizuki, who is weak and often is picked on. He later transfers to the same school as her for this reason. Chiemi is known for being a transparent person, where others can guess what she's thinking, and is a member of the tennis club (which surprises Akifumi when he first finds out, thinking that she would be part of the karate club). She is dating Akifumi Hirata, making her part of "Nishi High's Strongest Couple". Ironically, her name means "graced with beauty".
- Hirata Akifumi (平田 明史): A high school 1st year who is also called "the Black Devil of Nishi High," mostly because he has dark skin and fights a lot. Despite this, he is kind and honest. His grades are low because he skips classes to work at a car wash. His parents died before the storyline so he lives with his grandmother (who he affectionately calls 'Baa-chan' meaning "old lady") and his younger brother, Haruchika. He is dating Chiemi Yusa, making him part of "Nishi High's Strongest Couple".
- Komari Yukari (小牧 由香里): A close friend of Chiemi and Maki. She is well known for being the one who asks Chiemi the most about her love life. Her comments are often shrewd and blunt, embarrassing Chiemi. She often spies of Akifumi to hear if he says anything about his relationship with Chiemi. After hearing something interesting, she'll often reveal herself to Akifumi, forcing him to pay her to keep her from saying anything to Chiemi. She has a serious crush on Ohno and is in the tennis club, along with Chiemi. In the sequel, her relationship took another level with Ohno.
- Hoshii Maki (星井 真樹): A close friend of Chiemi and Yukari. Not much is known about her, but she is the most girly of the three. She also tends to be the one who tries to keep Yukari out of Chiemi and Akifumi's relationship, being a voice of reason for the group. Hirota often hits on her, which she rebukes as though she doesn't notice.
- Ohno Renji (大野 蓮児): Close friend of Akifumi and Hirota, he is well known for his bleached hair and habit of smoking. He is much calmer than Akifumi or Hirota (who tend to be impulsive). He works at a shop where they sell jewelry and even tries to pierce Yukari's ears when she complains about none of the jewelry fitting her style. Yukari has a crush on him. In the sequel, he and Yukari took another steps on their love-hate relationship.
- Hirota Tomomi (広田 智巳): Akifumi and Ohno's frivolous friend who is infamous for his Elvis-like hairstyle, which he is obsessed with. He is very loud, impulsive, and hits on any girl he finds slightly attractive (this includes Chiemi when he's drunk). He tends to be the one who points about Chiemi's physical attributes to Akifumi, much to his friend's dismay.
- Kuramori Akio (倉森 明緒): a childhood friend of Akifumi. She has liked him since they were children and tries to sabotage his relationship with Chiemi in order to get him to go out with her. She and Chiemi argue when Akifumi isn't around, but end up becoming friends after Chiemi saves her after they fall off the top of the school building. Akio is fine as a result, but Chiemi ends up hurting her leg.
- Kashima Mizuki (香島 瑞希): Chiemi's cousin, he's physically very weak and is often picked on because he looks like a girl (although girls consider him cute. When they first meet him, Yukari and Mika ask him how he and Chiemi could possibly be related because he's girly and she isn't). Although he is the same age as Chiemi, he is much shorter. He was in the same kindergarten class as her and she often protected him from bullies. They end up going to different high schools so Mizuki transfers to be with his cousin. This angers Akifumi after he and his friends notice how clingy Mizuki is to Chiemi. After a close encounter with bullies from his last school, he starts to like Akifumi, who saved him.
- Yusa Norio (遊佐 法男): Chiemi's father, "the Great Yusa". A professional wrestler in his youth, he retired three years before the story begins. Although he is no longer in shape, he still revels in his glory days, much to Chiemi's dismay. She was often teased in grade and middle school because of her dad's fame for playing a villain within wrestling. He considers Chiemi to be his whole life now that he's retired, going so far as to start crying when he finds out that Akifumi has a reputation for being "evil" (since he thinks that Chiemi's type of guy is like what he used to be.) After first meeting Akifumi, he forbids him from seeing Chiemi, locking his daughter in her room for ten days to keep them apart. He even has Akifumi arrested as soon as he steps on the Yusa property. However, he gradually starts to accept Akifumi after a near-death encounter, forcing his daughter's boyfriend to listen to him read from his memoir (which is too long for words and ever growing). Ohno and Hirota are huge fans of his.
- Yusa Misako (遊佐 美沙子): Chiemi's mother, a kind, loving woman. She somewhat resembles Chiemi, but is considered much calmer and kinder. Her attitude is 'whatever happens, happens' and she just goes with the flow (mostly from having a high-maintenance husband and daughter). After Akifumi destroys a wall in order to free Chiemi from the room in which her father had locked her, her mother doesn't seem to notice at all. She is also the mother of Tomoya.
- Yusa Tomoya (遊佐 智哉): Chiemi's younger brother. He is the one who tells their parents about Akifumi's bad reputation, having heard rumors about him from classmates.
- Hirata Haruchika (平田 春親): Akifumi's younger brother, who is in the Sakura Class at his kindergarten. He complains about how his brother and grandmother cook curry, preferring Chiemi's. Whenever Akifumi is drunk, he starts calling Chiemi by his brother's name, thinking she is him.
- Tachibana Yuuya (立花 優弥): A guy who goes to Nishi High in class 1-J. He is considered one of the most handsome boys in the school and has an interest in Chiemi (though no one knows whether its friendly or not). He has apparently been watching her for some time, making up excuses to talk to her. At the end of the chapter that introduces him, it shows him talking with some classmates about a "game" he's playing with her, though it has not yet been revealed what that "game" is.

== Reception ==
The eleventh volume of Love Attack! ranked 21st in the Japanese Comic Rankings for November 11–17.
