= Tonari no 801-chan =

2007 Japanese Internet manga

- Tonari no 801-chan manga volume 1 cover.

となりの801ちゃん (Tonari no Yaoi-chan)
- Genre: Romantic comedy, Slice of life
- Manga
- Written by: Ajiko Kojima
- Published by: Ohzora Publishing
- Magazine: Romance Tiara
- Original run: April 18, 2006 – April 2016
- Volumes: 11
- Live-action film
- Directed by: Kōtarō Terauchi
- Released: September 5, 2007
- Runtime: 60 minutes
- Manga

Tonari no 801-chan: Fujoshiteki Kōkō Seikatsu
- Written by: Jin
- Published by: Kodansha
- Magazine: Bessatsu Friend
- Original run: November 28, 2007 – April 13, 2009
- Volumes: 3
- Manga

801-shiki Chūgakusei Nikki: Tonari no Hina-chan
- Written by: Jun Minamikata
- Published by: Ohzora Publishing
- Magazine: Romance Tiara
- Original run: April 11, 2009 – 2010
- Volumes: 1

Tonari no 801-chan (となりの801ちゃん, Tonari no Yaoi-chan; lit. My Neighbor Yaoi-chan) is a Japanese four-panel Internet manga written and illustrated by Ajiko Kojima. It centers on the relationship between a male otaku named Tibet and his yaoi-obsessed fujoshi girlfriend Yaoi whose obsession manifests as a small, green furry monster. Kojima started the manga on April 18, 2006, on his blog. Ohzora Publishing released the first bound volume in December 2006, and by June 2007, it had sold 150,000 copies. Serialization of the manga began with the first chapter in Ohzora's Romance Tiara magazine in April 2009, spanning a total of eleven volumes. The series concluded in 2016.

A shōjo manga re-imagining of the series entitled Tonari no 801-chan: Fujoshiteki Kōkō Seikatsu written and illustrated by Jin was serialized in Kodansha's Bessatsu Friend from November 28, 2007, to April 13, 2009. A spin-off manga series written and illustrated by Jun Minamikata called 801-shiki Chūgakusei Nikki: Tonari no Hina-chan started serialization in Romance Tiara in April 2009. A live action DVD-only film was produced in September 2007, and a drama CD was released in April 2008, and another followed in October 2008. An anime adaptation by Kyoto Animation was announced to air in Japan in 2009, but was unexpectedly canceled.

== Origin ==
The green monster featured in Tonari no 801-chan has its origins in 801-chan (やおいちゃん, Yaoi-chan), the real-life mascot of the Misono Bridge 801 shopping center in northern Kyoto, Japan. The mascot, resembling Kyoto's well-known Kamo eggplant, was designed in late 2005 by a student at Kyoto Seika University. The shopping center itself was named for its 800-meter length, adding one to represent future expansion. Since the numbers 8-0-1 can be read in Japanese as ya-o-i (yaoi), the mascot soon became an Internet phenomenon. This brought the mascot to the attention of Ajiko Kojima, a Japanese blogger who took the mascot and slightly altered its appearance, using it as a basis for use his new webcomic Tonari no 801-chan in April 2006.

== Plot and characters ==
Tonari no 801-chan is narrated by Tibet (チベット, Chibetto), otherwise known as Tibe-kun (チベ君, Chibe-kun), a twenty-eight-year-old company employee and boyfriend to Yaoi, otherwise known as Yaoi-chan (801ちゃん). Yaoi, who also works in a company, is a twenty-two-year-old fujoshi, a female otaku who is a fan of anime and manga series featuring yaoi, or romantic relationships between men. Tibet, who is an otaku himself, initially met Yaoi over the Internet. When she obsesses over yaoi, a small green furry monster comes out of a zipper from her back as the manifestation of her obsession. Tibet and Yaoi eventually get married and have two kids.

In Tonari no 801-chan: Fujoshiteki Kōkō Seikatsu, the story begins with the junior-high school student Rei Hoshino (星野 れい, Hoshino Rei), a fujoshi who does not especially have an interest in the 3D aspect of life. One rainy day, however, she takes an interest in a high school student named Kei Akai (赤井 彗, Akai Kei) and wants to get into the same high school as him. To that end, she enlists the help of her childhood friend Shōtarō Kamiyu (神湯 正太郎, Kamiyu Shōtarō) who helps her study for the entrance examination, and diet so as to become a cuter girl. All goes according to plan, until a scheming girl going to the same school named Luna Kurotsuki (黒月 ルナ, Kurotsuki Runa) makes it harder for Rei to get closer to Kei.

== Media ==
=== Manga ===
Tonari no 801-chan began as a four-panel Internet manga series written and illustrated by Ajiko Kojima which he started on his blog on April 18, 2006. Ohzora Publishing released the first bound volume of the manga on December 14, 2006, under their Next comics imprint, and as of June 12, 2018, eleven volumes have been published. Included in the volumes are additional manga strips not featured on his blog. The first two volumes have sold over 320,000 copies in Japan. The manga began serialization from the first chapter in Ohzora's josei manga magazine Romance Tiara on April 11, 2009. The blog was last updated on May 18, 2018.

A shōjo manga re-imagining of the series entitled Tonari no 801-chan: Fujoshiteki Kōkō Seikatsu (となりの801ちゃん～腐女子的♥高校生活～) written and illustrated by Jin started serialization in Kodansha's shōjo manga magazine Bessatsu Friend on November 28, 2007. The first volume was released on March 13, 2008, and the second followed on July 11, 2008; the volumes are published under Kodansha's KC Deluxe imprint.

A spin-off manga series entitled 801-shiki Chūgakusei Nikki: Tonari no Hina-chan (801式☆中学生日記～となりのひなちゃん～) written and illustrated by Jun Minamikata started serialization in Romance Tiara on April 11, 2009.

=== Film ===
A live action 60-minute film directed by Kōtarō Terauchi was released direct-to-DVD on September 5, 2007. The film stars Sō Hirosawa as Yaoi, and Koji Seto as Tibet, and also features Kotaro Yanagi playing a role. Ajiko Kojima, the original manga author, has a small cameo appearance in the film.

=== Drama CDs ===
A drama CD based on the original manga was released by Marine Entertainment in Japan on April 23, 2008, and the first-print version of the CD came bundled with a mini hand towel. Another drama CD was released by Marine Entertainment on October 22, 2008, and the first-print version came bundled with a mousepad sticker, and an extra track featuring a group talk of the drama cast.

=== Anime ===
An anime adaptation of the original manga was planned to be produced by Kyoto Animation and broadcast on TBS to begin airing in Japan in 2009, but was unexpectedly canceled. However, a 90-second "opening anime" called Tonari no 801-chan R (となりの801ちゃんR) was produced by A-1 Pictures and directed by Yutaka Yamamoto; it was bundled with the fourth volume of the original web manga released on September 10, 2009.
