= Flower of Eden =

Japanese manga series

- Cover of the first volume

エデンの花 (Eden no Hana)
- Genre: Drama, romance
- Manga
- Written by: Yuki Suetsugu
- Published by: Kodansha
- Magazine: Bessatsu Friend
- Original run: August 2000 – April 2004
- Volumes: 12

Flower of Eden (Japanese: エデンの花, Hepburn: Eden no Hana) is a Japanese manga series written and illustrated by Yuki Suetsugu. It was serialized in Kodansha's shōjo manga magazine Bessatsu Friend from the August 2000 issue to the April 2004 issue. Its individual chapters were collected into twelve tankōbon volumes. Following accusations of plagiarism, the series is out of print.

== Plot ==
Midori Wakatsuki is a beautiful but introverted girl who simply cannot connect with her peers and wants to run away from home. The reason for her unsociability is that after her parents' death, she was placed in an abusive foster family where she was sexually assaulted by her adopted brother. When her real brother, Tokio, comes back from the States and demands custody, Midori's life changes forever.

== Media ==
=== Manga ===
Written and illustrated by Yuki Suetsugu, the series was serialized in Kodansha's shōjo manga magazine Bessatsu Friend from the August 2000 issue to the April 2004 issue. Its individual chapters were collected into twelve tankōbon volumes. In August 2005, Tokyopop announced that they had licensed the series for English publication.

In October 2005, Suetsugu was accused of plagiarising Takehiko Inoue's Slam Dunk and Real. Kodansha confirmed many of the allegations and the author herself admitted to some. As a result, Kodansha ceased publications of Flower of Eden. Tokyopop cancelled their English release on the request from Kodansha before the first volume was released.

=== TV drama ===
The Korean drama television series One Fine Day was originally produced as an adaptation of Flower of Eden. However, following the accusations of plagiarism, it was reworked into an original story.
