= Life 2: Giver/Taker =

Japanese manga series and its adaptation

- First tankōbon volume cover, featuring Itsuki Kurasawa

ライフ2 ギバーテイカー (Raifu Tsū: Gibā Teikā)
- Genre: Crime; Drama; Suspense
- Manga
- Written by: Keiko Suenobu
- Published by: Kodansha
- English publisher: NA: Kodansha USA
- Imprint: Afternoon KC
- Magazine: Monthly Afternoon
- Original run: June 25, 2016 – October 25, 2018
- Volumes: 6
- Television drama

Giver Taker
- Directed by: Kosuke Suzuki
- Produced by: Yasunori Aoki (Note: Credited as chief producer.); Yusuke Kobayashi; Jun Kurosawa; Mizuho Shizukuishi
- Written by: Hiroyuki Komine
- Music by: Yuki Hayashi; Daiki Okuno
- Studio: Wowow
- Original network: Wowow Prime; Wowow On Demand
- Original run: January 22, 2023 – February 19, 2023
- Episodes: 5
- icon

Life 2: Giver/Taker (Japanese: ライフ2 ギバーテイカー, Hepburn: Raifu Tsū: Gibā Teikā) is a Japanese manga series written and illustrated by Keiko Suenobu. It is a sequel to Suenobu's manga series Life and follows an entirely different set of characters. It was serialized in Kodansha's seinen manga magazine Monthly Afternoon from June 2016 to October 2018, with its chapters collected in six tankōbon volumes. In North America, the manga was licensed for English release by Kodansha USA. A five-part live-action drama adaptation, simply titled Giver Taker, aired in Japan on Wowow from January to February 2023.

== Plot ==
Six years ago, Itsuki Kurasawa witnessed the death of her sister Honoka at the hands of eleven-year old Ruoto Kishi. In the aftermath of Ruoto's arrest, Itsuki's family and her life fell apart. Fueled by a desire to prevent any more suffering like she did, Itsuki grows up to become a formidable police detective.

In the present day, Itsuki is informed that Ruoto has just been released. On the way home, she finds a note on her door with a message threatening to "steal what's most important to [her] once more." Knowing Ruoto is behind this and speculating that he will go back to killing again, Itsuki vows to put him back in prison. Her recklessness gets her in trouble with the police department and even the public, as Ruoto, who now runs a bakery under an alias, uses his charming looks and personality to feign innocence. With the help of a few unlikely allies, such as fellow detective Kaname Imai, Itsuki is proven correct when she uncovers a number of deaths and suspected murders all leading back to Ruoto since his release, including one from before Honoka's death. Now in a race against time, Itsuki is desperate to stop Ruoto before he kills even more.

Aside from sharing a few themes, Life 2: Giver/Taker has no relation to Life's story and characters.

== Characters ==
Itsuki Kurasawa (倉澤 樹, Kurasawa Itsuki)
Portrayed by: Miki Nakatani
Ruoto Kishi (貴志 ルオト, Kishi Ruoto)
Portrayed by: Fuma Kikuchi
Kaname Imai (今井 要, Imai Kaname)
Portrayed by: Hiroyuki Ikeuchi
Riko Tsubaki (椿 理子, Tsubaki Riko)
Portrayed by: Mai Fukagawa
Satomi Tsuyama (津山 聡美, Tsuyama Satomi)
Portrayed by: Fumika Baba
Yuichi Onozuka (小野塚 優一, Onozuka Yūichi) (Note: This character is original to the drama series.)
Portrayed by: Hisashi Yoshizawa
Marie Kishi (貴志 茉莉, Kishi Marie)
Portrayed by: Yuki Saito
Toshikazu Ugajin (宇賀神 敏一, Ugajin Toshikazu)
Portrayed by: Yoshihiko Hakamada
Masahiro Nishina (仁科 昌裕, Nishina Masahiro)
Portrayed by: Toshiya Toyama
Shinya Kagari (篝 伸哉, Kagari Shin'ya)
Portrayed by: Yusuke Hirayama
Yayoi Arisaka (有坂 弥生, Arisaka Yayoi)
Portrayed by: Hiyori Sakurada
Yoshiyuki Tsuyama (津山 善行, Tsuyama Yoshiyuki)
Portrayed by: Oolongta Yoshida
Yasuhisa Minato (湊 靖久, Minato Yasuhisa)
Portrayed by: Tetsuhiro Ikeda

== Media ==
=== Manga ===
Written and illustrated by Keiko Suenobu, Life 2: Giver/Taker is a sequel to Suenobu's manga series Life (ライフ, Raifu). It was serialized in Kodansha's seinen manga magazine Monthly Afternoon from June 25, 2016, to October 25, 2018. Kodansha collected its chapters in six tankōbon volumes, released between October 21, 2016, and November 21, 2018. In March 2023, Kodansha USA announced that they had licensed the sequel manga for digital release in English alongside the original Life series; six volumes were released between March 14 and August 8, 2023.

==== Volumes ====
No.	Original release date	Original ISBN	English release date	English ISBN
1	October 21, 2016	978-4-06-388194-3	March 14, 2023	978-1-68491-572-9
1. "Killer Knight" (殺人騎士, Satsujin Kishi); 2. "The Victim's Family" (被害者家族, Higaisha Kazoku)
2	December 22, 2016	978-4-06-388227-8	April 11, 2023	978-1-68491-579-8
3. "Devil" (悪魔, Akuma); 4. "The Way of the Detective" (刑事として, Keiji toshite); 5. "Transformation" (変貌, Henbō); 6. "Their Respective Beginnings" (それぞれの旅立ち, Sorezore no Tabidachi)
3	May 23, 2017	978-4-06-388260-5	May 9, 2023	978-1-68491-628-3
7. "Convergence" (接近, Sekkin); 8. "Family" (家族, Kazoku); 9. "Monster" (モンスター, Monsutā); 10. "Face-to-Face" (対面, Taimen)
4	November 22, 2017	978-4-06-510375-3	June 13, 2023	978-1-68491-689-4
11. "Testimony" (証言, Shōgen); 12. "Questioning" (聴取, Chōshu); 13. "Turn For The Worse" (暗転, Anten); 14. "Isolation" (孤立, Koritsu); 15. "The Match Continues" (試合続行, Shiai Zokkō)
5	May 23, 2018	978-4-06-511398-1	July 11, 2023	979-8-88933-034-9
16. "A New World" (新天地, Shintenchi); 17. "Target" (ターゲット, Tāgetto); 18. "Activation" (始動, Shidō); 19. "Climax" (絶頂, Zecchō); 20. "Rage" (怒り, Ikari)
6	November 21, 2018	978-4-06-513495-5	August 8, 2023	979-8-88933-095-0
21. "Roar" (叫び, Sakebi); 22. "Vow" (誓い, Chikai); 23. "Carnage" (修羅, Shura); 24. "Cops and Robbers" (鬼ごっこ, Onigokko); 25. "Choice" (選択, Sentaku); 26. "Giver Taker" (ギバーテイカー, Gibā Teikā)

=== Television drama ===
In September 2022, Wowow announced that a live-action television drama adaptation of Life 2: Giver/Taker would premiere on the Wowow Prime and Wowow on Demand services in 2023. Titled Giver Taker (ギバーテイカー, Gibā Teikā), it was directed by Kosuke Suzuki, written by Hiroyuki Komine, and starred Miki Nakatani as Itsuki Kurasawa. Itsuki's character was changed so that her murdered sister Honoka was now her daughter, the murder took place twelve years ago instead of six, and she was a schoolteacher before becoming a police detective. The series aired in five episodes from January 22 to February 19, 2023. A DVD box set of the complete series was released on October 4, 2023.

== Reception ==
Reviewing the first volume, Rebecca Silverman of Anime News Network rated it four stars out of five, praising its story and Keiko Suenobu's art which she found "cleaner and more polished" than in Life, although she noted its tenuous connection as a sequel with the latter. Silverman later selected Life 2: Giver/Taker as one of Anime News Network's "Best Manga and Light Novels of 2023", writing "At six volumes long, it doesn't overstay its welcome while still having enough time to truly develop its story and characters, and the ending is satisfying while still being haunting. It's the sort of series you could read in one sitting but will think about for weeks afterward."
