= Shizuru Seino =

Japanese manga artist

- Born: June 10, 1976 (age 50)
- Occupation: Manga artist
- Known for: Love Attack!, Girl Got Game
- Website: Orange Biscuit

Shizuru Seino (清野静流, Seino Shizuru) is a Japanese manga artist. Her works include Power!!, published in North America as Girl Got Game, and Love Attack!.

== Bibliography ==
- (1997) Suki Suki Daisuki (好き好き大好き)
- (1998) Suki Suki Darling (スキスキダーリン)
- (1999) Usotsuki na Kanojo (まっすぐに純愛)
- (1999–2002) Power!!; English translation: Girl Got Game
- (2003) Heaven!!
- (2005–Present) Junai Tokkō Taichō! (純愛特攻隊長！); English translation: Love Attack!
- (2011–Present) RabuKatsu!; English translation: Love Win!
- (2013–Present) Seishun Otome Banchou
