= Keiko Suenobu =

Japanese manga artist

Keiko Suenobu (Japanese: すえのぶ けいこ, Hepburn: Suenobu Keiko; March 23, 1979) is a female Japanese shōjo manga artist from Kitakyūshū, Fukuoka. She graduated from the School of Art and Design at the University of Tsukuba with a major in sculpture. In 2006, Suenobu's manga series, Life won the Kodansha Manga Award for best shōjo manga. Life and her manga series Limit were adapted for broadcast as live-action television drama series. Bullying is a recurring theme in her stories.

== Works ==
- Vitamin (ビタミン) (2001, Kodansha). In this single-volume manga, Suenobu portrays how the female protagonist, fifteen-year-old Sawako Yarimizu, copes with the changes in her life when her friends and classmates suddenly switch to bullying her, after she is seen having, coerced, sex in an empty classroom, during their third year in Middle school. Serialized in three instalments in the September to November 2001 issues of Bessatsu Friend, the tankōbon volume was released on November 9, 2001.
- Life (ライフ) (2002, Kodansha). A twenty-volume manga focused on Ayumu Shiiba. To cope with fatigue and the pressures of achieving good grades, Ayumu resorts to self-harm, especially after falling out with a middle school friend, and starts to isolate herself. In high school she becomes the target of mobbing but endures and gradually finds strength and solace by developing a strong bond with classmate Miki Hatori. A short post-script about dealing with self-injury written by Susan M. Axtell Psy.D. was printed in English translations of Life as published by Tokyopop.
- Happy Tomorrow (ハッピー・トゥモロー) (2003, Kodansha). Published as a single-volume, on January 8, 2003, this collection contains the eponymous story, about an ostracised and bullied school girl, bundled with three of Suenobu's other one-shot manga, including her debut, 手をつなごう (Let's hold hands).
- Limit (リミット) (2009, Kodansha). A six-volume story of survival after a bus crash on a school trip.
- Hope (ホープ) (2013, Kodansha). In this story Suenobu depicts the battles of female protagonist Hikari, who from an early age aspires to become a professional shōjo manga artist, a cartoonist with a target audience of primarily teenage girls. Serialized in the March 2013 to April 2015 issues of Bessatsu Friend, Hope was collected in six tankōbon volumes. The first book was released on May 13, 2013. The final volume came out on April 13, 2015.
- Life 2: Giver/Taker (ライフ2 ギバーテイカー) (2016, Kodansha) A six-volume manga and sequel to Life, follows a police detective named Itsuki Kurasawa who is after released criminal Ruoto Kishi, a young man who killed her sister, and whom she suspects is out to kill even more people.
- It's Over If You Fall (おちたらおわり) (2019, Kodansha) - is about a housewife who move to apartment with her husband and daughter who face with her bully is now married and had daughter
