= I See Your Face, Turned Away =

Japanese manga series

- First tankōbon volume cover

きみの横顔を見ていた (Kimi no Yokogao o Miteita)
- Genre: Coming-of-age; Drama; Romance
- Manga
- Written by: Rumi Ichinohe
- Published by: Kodansha
- English publisher: NA: Kodansha USA
- Imprint: Kodansha Comics Betsufure
- Magazine: Bessatsu Friend
- Original run: April 13, 2022 – April 13, 2026
- Volumes: 6

I See Your Face, Turned Away (きみの横顔を見ていた, Kimi no Yokogao Miteita; lit. 'I Was Looking at You in Profile') is a Japanese manga series written and illustrated by Rumi Ichinohe. It was serialized in Kodansha's shōjo manga magazine Bessatsu Friend from April 2022 to April 2026.

== Synopsis ==
The series is centered around four high school students experiencing unrequited love. Hikari believes romance is not for her, and as she looks for a boyfriend for her friend Mari, she stumbles upon Ohtani and Asagiri, believing one of the two to be perfect for Mari. Later, Hikari starts to wonder if she wants to remain as Mari's friend, as she begins to have feelings for Ohtani. Ohtani is the class clown who has feelings for Mari, but Mari, a fairly quiet and anxious girl, has feelings for her homeroom teacher Matsudaira, and Asagiri, an attractive young man, who is interested in Hikari.

== Publication ==
Written and illustrated by Rumi Ichinohe, I See Your Face, Turned Away began serialization in Kodansha's shōjo manga magazine Bessatsu Friend on April 13, 2022. The series went on hiatus on September 30, 2024, due to "production reasons", and delayed the release of its fifth volume from its early 2025 scheduling. It returned to serialization on December 12, 2025, and the final chapter was published on January 13, 2026. A spin-off story ran from February 13, to April 13, 2026. The series' chapters were collected into six tankōbon volumes released from September 13, 2022, to July 13, 2026.

During their panel at Anime Expo 2023, Kodansha USA announced that they licensed the series, with the first volume being released in May 2024.

No.	Original release date	Original ISBN	North American release date	North American ISBN
1	September 13, 2022	978-4-06-529156-6	May 7, 2024	979-8-88877-160-0
1. "Monolid Hikari-chan 1"; 2. "Monolid Hikari-chan 2"; 3. "Monolid Hikari-chan 3"; 4. "Ohtani-kun Can't Remain Pure 1"; Bonus: "Hikari-chan's Break"; Bonus: "Ohtani-kun's Break"
2	February 13, 2023	978-4-06-530574-4	July 30, 2024	979-8-88877-161-7
5. "Ohtani-kun Can't Remain Pure 2"; 6. "Ohtani-kun Can't Remain Pure 3"; 7. "Takahashi-san Can't Talk Very Much 1"; 8. "Takahashi-san Can't Talk Very Much 2"; Bonus: "Ohtani-kun's Break"; Bonus: "Takahashi-san's Break"
3	February 13, 2024	978-4-06-534642-6	November 12, 2024	979-8-88877-162-4
9. "Takahashi-san Can't Talk Very Much 3"; 10. "Asagiri-kun Wants to Learn About Love 1"; 11. "Asagiri-kun Wants to Learn About Love 2"; 12. "Asagiri-kun Wants to Learn About Love 3"; Bonus: "Takahashi-san's Break"; Bonus: "Asagiri-kun's Break"
4	August 9, 2024	978-4-06-536614-1	August 19, 2025	979-8-88877-163-1
13. "Monolid Hikari-chan 4"; 14. "Ohtani-kun Can't Remain Pure 4"; 15. "Takahashi-kun Can't Talk Very Much 4"; 16. "Asagiri-kun Wants to Learn About Love 4"
5	April 13, 2026	978-4-06-543206-8	—	—
6	July 13, 2026	978-4-06-544212-8	—	—

== Reception ==
The series won the 48th Kodansha Manga Award in the shōjo category.
