= Kouta Nomura =

Japanese actor (born 2003)

- Born: November 30, 2003 (age 22); Tokyo, Japan
- Other name: Kota Nomura (Note: His first name is widely romanized as "Kota" but the official/correct romanization is "Kouta".)
- Occupation: Actor
- Years active: 2022–present
- Agent: Ken-On
- Father: Ikki Sawamura

Japanese name
- Kanji: 野村 康太
- Hiragana: のむら こうた
Transcriptions
- Romanization: Nomura Kōta
- Website: kouta-nomura.com

Kouta Nomura (野村 康太, Nomura Kōta; born November 30, 2003) is a Japanese actor.

== Biography ==
Nomura was born on November 30, 2003, in Tokyo. His mother was a former model and his father is actor Ikki Sawamura. He is the middle child among three brothers, with his older brother being model Taiki Nomura.

== Filmography ==
=== Film ===
Year	Title	Role	Notes	Ref.
2024	Don't Lose Your Head!	Hirohide Okano		
2024	I Just Want to Understand You	Haruki		
2024	Perfect Propose: Dream Edition	Kei Fukaya	Lead role	
2025	The Lonely Six	Kayama Ito	Lead role	
2026	Blue Lock	Rensuke Kunigami		
2027	Irresistible I Love You	Saku Wataya	Lead role	

=== Television ===
Year	Title	Role	Notes	Ref.
2022	New Nobunaga Chronicle: High School Is a Battlefield	Toshiie Maeda		
2022	Silent	Keisuke Nishida		
2022	Who is the Sender?	Seiji Ushida		
2023	I Inherited a Host Club	Shun Natsume	Episodes 4 and 9–11	
2023	The Expert of Changing Jobs	Kosuke Fujikawa		
2023	Shut Up	Itsuki Enomoto		
2024	Perfect Propose	Kai Fukaya	Lead role; web series	
2024	I Want to Break Up with the Man I Love	Kazuma	Episodes 6, 7, 9, and 10	
2024	My Girlfriend's Child	Yuki Kawakami		
2024	Until I Destroyed My Husband's Other Family	Wataru Miyake		
2024	My Dress-Up Darling	Wakana Gojo	Lead role	
2024	Usotoki Rhetoric	Satsuki Honjo	Episode 9	
2025	Who Saw the Peacock Dance in the Jungle?	Mamoru Akazawa		
2025	Parallel Couple: The Truth Behind Our Death	Kosuke Maruyama		
2025	Dear My Baby: Until I Control You	Takuto Moriyama		
2025	My Husband, Would You Please Die?	Takuto Moriyama	Episode 4; guest	
2025	The Big Chase: Tokyo SSBC Files	Shinnosuke Shiro		

== Bibliography ==
=== Magazine ===
- Men's Non-no (November 2023 issue) – Exclusive model

=== Photo Book ===
- Nomura Kota 1st Photo Collection "Akiki" (October 24, 2025, Kodansha) ISBN 978-4-0654-0770-7
