= Girl Got Game =

Japanese manga series

- Cover of the 10th Japanese volume
- Genre: Romance, Sports, Gender bender
- Manga
- Written by: Shizuru Seino
- Published by: Kodansha
- English publisher: Tokyopop
- Magazine: Bessatsu Friend
- Original run: 1999 – 2002
- Volumes: 10

Girl Got Game, originally published in Japan as Power!!, is a manga series written and illustrated by Shizuru Seino. Originally serialized in Bessatsu Friend from 1999 until 2002, the individual chapters have been collected and published in ten tankōbon volumes by Kodansha. The series focuses on Kyo Aizawa, a girl forced by her father to live as a boy so she can be on her new school's boys' top-ranked basketball team. It was licensed for an English language release in North America by Tokyopop, which completed releasing the series in August 2005.

== Characters ==
- Kyo Aizawa (相沢 香, Aizawa Kyō) – a high school girl who wants a cute boyfriend and to wear the lovely Seisyu High School girl's uniform. Unfortunately, ever since her father tore his Achilles tendon, he hoped and planned for her to fulfill his dream of being a basketball star. Grudgingly, she attends Seisyu as a boy and proves to be an invaluable member of the boys' basketball team though she is also the shortest member. She is very popular with the girls at Seisyu, who think she's a boy. Despite her desire to be feminine, Kyo has a very masculine way of interacting with people. Whether this is her nature or the effect of sharing a dormitory with boys is unclear.
- Chiharu Eniwa (恵庭 千晴, Eniwa Chiharu) – one of the best players in the boys' basketball team, and one of the most popular guys at Seisyu. He and Kyo are roommates and the two initially get off to a bad start, but gradually learn to get along relatively well and he eventually develops a crush on her. Chiharu is the first of Kyo's friends to learn that she is a girl and immediately begins to help her cover up her secret, despite not understanding why. Despite his popularity with girls, Chiharu is more interested in basketball than girls, a practice that lost him his first girlfriend. He is very irritable and seems always annoyed at something, which partially due to his loving Kyo and being unwilling to admit it. Despite that he has a good heart underneath. Kyo is very good at "pushing his buttons".
- Shinji Hamaya (浜谷 真二, Hayama Shinji) – a fellow member of the basketball team and Kyo's faithful companion. Hamaya is mostly after girls and is the least popular player in the team. Though hopeless with most girls, he eventually gets a girlfriend, Emiri Kozono, until she moves to Germany. He is the biggest comic relief and is prone to inexplicably losing all of his clothes (including his underwear). He is extremely perverted and keeps a large stash of pornographic videos and magazines. As a member of the basketball team, Hamaya is frequently Kyo's "stepladder" for her slam dunks.
- Hisashi Imai (今井 寿, Imai Hisashi) – the captain of Seisyu's boys' basketball team. He has a room to himself (which he frequently shares with Chiharu when he and Kyo argue) and is very popular. Imai is a very good friend of Chiharu's and a friendly upbeat person, willing to help his friends should they call upon him. In volume 9, he and the rest of the boys' basketball team (except Chiharu and Kensuke, who were keeping this secret) discover that Kyo is a girl. When Kyo challenges the basketball team to get her position back, Imai is the only one who is able to stop her, giving merit to his position as the basketball team captain.
- Tsuyaka Himejima (姫島 艶華, Himejima Tsuyaka) – Kyo's longtime friend who enrolled in Seisyu in order to play basketball with Kyo and became the captain of the girls' basketball team. Tsuyaka is prone to a frightening attitude and does not look like a teenage student, standing around six feet tall. She is very determined, very ruthless, and can be somewhat selfish and insensitive to others. For part of the series, Hamaya expresses a profound interest in her. She exposes Kyo's secret to Chiharu after losing a game to him in hopes of forcing Kyo to join the girls' team. Tsuyaka is persistent and insistent that Kyo openly becomes a girl again so that she may play on Seisyu's girls' basketball team, and will not hesitate to use underhanded means if necessary.
- Kensuke Yura (由良 健介, Yura Kensuke) – a high-ranking basketball player and a genius due to his photographic memory, Kensuke lives a hard life despite being bright and an excellent basketball player. He does not live in the dormitory with the other students. He has a crush on Kyo, and because of this, he re-joins the boys' basketball team just to be with her. He suspects Kyo is a girl when he first meets her and she later confirms it. Kensuke displays extreme emotional distress and even goes as far as to attempt suicide by burning down a building with Kyo and himself trapped inside. However, Chiharu saves them both and Kensuke is gradually able to accept Kyo's friendship and finds various ways to try to bring her together with Chiharu.
- Akari Tojo (東條 あかり, Tōjō Akari) – the boys' team manager and has a major crush on Kyo; she thinks Kyo is actually a boy, even when Kyo comes to school dressed as a girl, probably due to denial. Not surprisingly, her crush is unrequited, and Akari eventually stops trying to get close to Kyo when she mistakenly believes that Kyo (as a boy) is attracted to boys. She is very energetic and aggressive (to the point where she is credited with being Kyo's first kiss), and proficient with many forms of weaponry, which she can suddenly pull from thin-air.
- Ko Aizawa (相沢の父, Aizawa's father) – Kyo's father, a talented basketball player until his Achilles' tendon tore. With his dreams of joining the NBA shot down, he passed down his love of the game to Kyo, who enjoyed playing basketball because it meant spending time with her dad. He dreams for Kyo to play in the NBA (NBA or WNBA, unknown) - and ultimately made the decision to enroll her in Seisyu as a boy.
- Natsumi Ayaha (綾葉 なつみ, Ayaha Natsumi) – the dorm manager of the boys' dormitory at Seisyu High. She was previously a basketball player capable enough to keep up with most boys, but an injury ended her aspirations, much like Kyo's father. Notably, she does not appear beyond the first volume, which is something characters poke fun at during the series.
- Saburo Fujio (藤尾 三郎, Fujio Saburo) – the coach of the boys' basketball team, who is as moody and irritable as the teenagers he works with.

== Media ==
=== Volume listing ===
No.	Original release date	Original ISBN	English release date	English ISBN
01	December 9, 1999	978-4-06-303176-8	January 6, 2004	978-1-59182-696-5
Chapters 1–3; Extra Pages Presented by Shizuru-Boo
02	March 13, 2000	978-4-06-303186-7	March 2, 2004	978-1-59182-697-2
03	August 8, 2000	978-4-06-341204-8	May 4, 2004	978-1-59182-698-9
04	December 13, 2000	978-4-06-341216-1	July 6, 2004	978-1-59182-699-6
05	April 13, 2001	978-4-06-341253-6	September 7, 2004	978-1-59182-700-9
06	September 13, 2001	978-4-06-341253-6	November 2, 2004	978-1-59182-701-6
07	November 13, 2001	978-4-06-341257-4	January 11, 2005	978-1-59182-986-7
08	April 12, 2002	978-4-06-341278-9	March 8, 2005	978-1-59182-987-4
09	August 9, 2002	978-4-06-341297-0	May 10, 2005	978-1-59182-988-1
10	December 13, 2002	978-4-06-341316-8	August 9, 2005	978-1-59182-989-8
