= My Girlfriend's Child =

Japanese manga series

- Cover of the first volume

あの子の子ども (Ano Ko no Kodomo)
- Genre: Romantic drama
- Manga
- Written by: Mamoru Aoi
- Published by: Kodansha
- English publisher: NA: Seven Seas Entertainment
- Imprint: Kodansha Comics Betsufure
- Magazine: Bessatsu Friend
- Original run: May 13, 2021 – July 12, 2024
- Volumes: 10
- Television drama
- Directed by: Hidenobu Abera; Miyō Yamaura; Takeshi Matsuura
- Written by: Naomi Hiruta
- Music by: Haruka Nakamura
- Studio: Kansai TV
- Original network: FNS (Kansai TV, Fuji TV)
- Original run: June 25, 2024 – September 17, 2024
- Episodes: 12

My Girlfriend's Child (Japanese: あの子の子ども, Hepburn: Ano Ko no Kodomo) is a Japanese manga series written and illustrated by Mamoru Aoi.

It tells the story of high schoolers Sachi and her boyfriend Takara who must suddenly deal with Sachi's unexpected pregnancy, exploring topics around teen pregnancy and how the characters' lives and interpersonal relations are shaped by the event.

The manga began serialization in Kodansha's shōjo manga magazine Bessatsu Friend in May 2021. The manga ended serialization in July 2024, with the tenth and final tankōbon volume released the following November. A television drama adaptation aired from June to September 2024.

In 2023, the manga won the 47th Kodansha Manga Award in the shōjo category. The English release of the first volume was nominated for the 2024 Eisner Award for Best Publication for Teens.

== Synopsis ==
High school students Sachi Kawakami and Takara Tsukishima have been a couple for an undetermined period of time and are starting to think about the future. After a condom breaks, Sachi worries about what will happen if she gets pregnant. She finally takes a pregnancy test—which comes back positive. She considers her options and who she can turn to for support. Despite the test, she doubts whether she's really pregnant, and when she sees Takara again, she can't bring herself to tell him.

== Characters ==
Sachi Kawakami (川上福, Kawakami Sachi)
Portrayed by: Hiyori Sakurada
Takara Tsukishima (月島宝, Tsukishima Takara)
Portrayed by: Kanata Hosoda
Nozomi Yazawa (矢沢望, Yazawa Nozomi)
Portrayed by: Mizuki Kayashima
Hayato Sasabe (笹部隼人, Sasabe Hayato)
Portrayed by: Oshiro Maeda
Kō Kawakami (川上幸, Kawakami Kō)
Portrayed by: Kouta Nomura
Yūto Okita (沖田侑斗, Okita Yūto)
Portrayed by: Atsushi Hashimoto
Kei Kawakami (川上慶, Kawakami Kei)
Portrayed by: Tōru Nomaguchi
Naomi Tsukishima (月島直実, Tsukishima Naomi)
Portrayed by: Rie Mimura
Harumi Kawakami (川上晴美, Kawakami Harumi)
Portrayed by: Hikari Ishida

== Media ==
=== Manga ===
Written and illustrated by Mamoru Aoi, the series began serialization in Kodansha's Bessatsu Friend magazine on May 13, 2021. The series entered its final arc on December 13, 2023. The series ended its main story on July 12, 2024, with four spin-off chapters being published from August 13 that same year. The series' individual chapters were collected into ten tankōbon volumes released from September 13, 2021, to November 13, 2024.

In September 2022, Seven Seas Entertainment announced that they licensed the series for English publication.

==== Volume list ====
No.	Original release date	Original ISBN	English release date	English ISBN
1	September 13, 2021	978-4-06-524788-4	April 25, 2023	978-1-68579-699-0
2	January 13, 2022	978-4-06-526435-5	July 11, 2023	978-1-68579-707-2
3	May 13, 2022	978-4-06-527696-9	November 7, 2023	978-1-68579-939-7
4	September 13, 2022	978-4-06-529175-7	April 9, 2024	979-8-88843-376-8
5	January 13, 2023	978-4-06-530378-8	August 20, 2024	979-8-88843-858-9
6	May 12, 2023	978-4-06-531727-3	December 24, 2024	979-8-89160-048-5
7	September 13, 2023	978-4-06-532997-9	April 1, 2025	979-8-89160-969-3
8	March 13, 2024	978-4-06-534633-4	August 19, 2025	979-8-89373-357-0
9	August 9, 2024	978-4-06-535878-8	December 23, 2025	979-8-89373-814-8
10	November 13, 2024	978-4-06-536711-7	April 21, 2026	979-8-89561-449-5

=== Drama ===
A television drama adaptation was announced on May 25, 2024. The drama is directed by Hidenobu Abera, Miyō Yamaura, and Takeshi Matsuura, with Naomi Hiruta handling series composition and Haruka Nakamura composing the music. It aired on Kansai Television from June 25 to September 17, 2024.

== Reception ==
The series ranked eighth on the Publisher Comics' Recommended Comics list of 2022. In the 2022 edition of the Kono Manga ga Sugoi! guidebook, the series ranked 14th on the list of the top manga for female readers. In 2023, My Girlfriend's Child won the 47th Kodansha Manga Award in the shōjo category. In 2024, the first volume was nominated for the Eisner Award for Best Publication for Teens.

Manga author Makoto Yukimura recommended the manga on his Twitter account in May 2023, where he commented: "It is a manga which very earnestly and seriously considers its theme. Mamoru Aoi's precise skill and earnest approach to creation touched my heart."
