= Agaru Anime =

Japanese late-night anime programming block

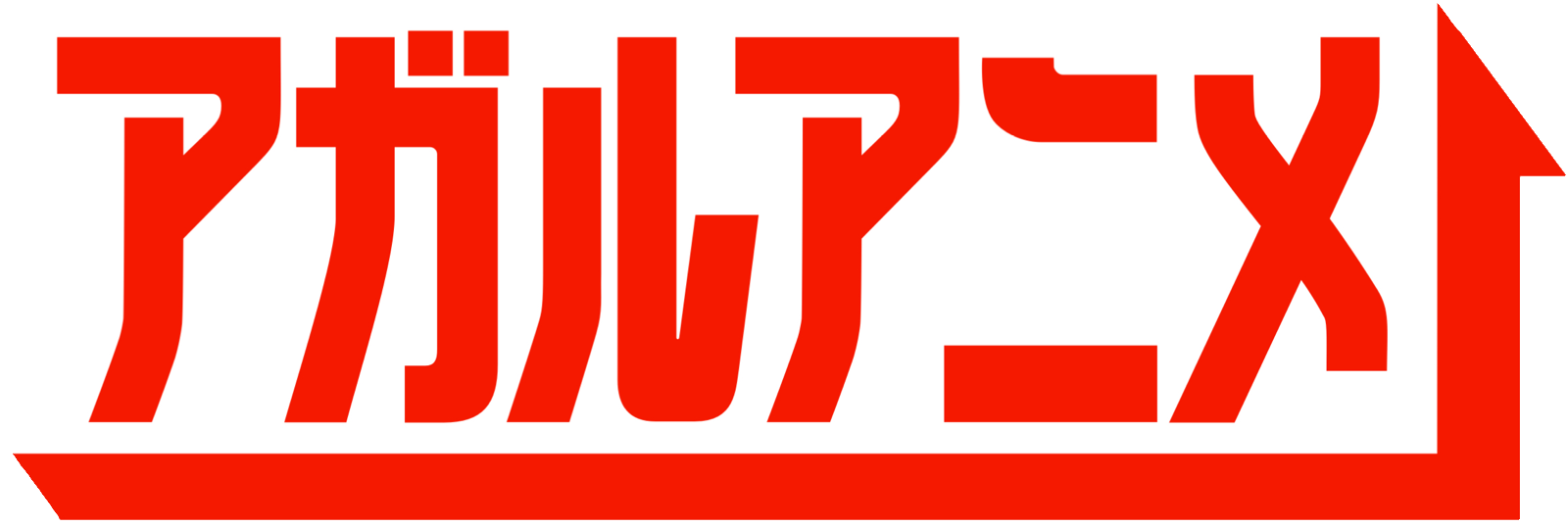
- Network: CBC Television
- Launched: April 7, 2024; 2 years ago
- Division of: JNN
- Country of origin: Japan
- Sister network: TBS
- Format: Anime
- Running time: Sundays 23:30–24:00 (JST)
- Original language: Japanese
- Official website: Official website

Agaru Anime (Japanese: アガルアニメ) is a Japanese late-night anime programming block produced by CBC Television under the JNN affiliation. The block premiered in April 2024, and airs on Sunday nights from 23:30 to 24:00 JST (effectively Sunday nights from 11:30 p.m. to Monday midnight JST).

== History ==
Prior to the creation of the block, since April 2011, JNN affiliates aired programs produced by CBC on the timeslot with documentaries and variety shows. However, in April 2024, the timeslot was reorganized and subsequently converted into an anime programming block, making it the first anime block to be produced on the channel since Kirby: Right Back at Ya!, with the theme of representing anime from Nagoya to the rest of Japan and the world.

As a Reincarnated Aristocrat, I'll Use My Appraisal Skill to Rise in the World and Kinnikuman: Perfect Origin Arc were announced as the debut lineup of the programming block, with the former becoming the first program to air on the timeslot.

== Titles ==
| No. | Title | Start date | End date | Eps. | Studio(s) | Notes | Ref. |
|---|---|---|---|---|---|---|---|
| 1 | As a Reincarnated Aristocrat, I'll Use My Appraisal Skill to Rise in the World | April 7, 2024 | June 23, 2024 | 12 | Studio Mother | Based on the light novel series by Miraijin A. | |
| 2 | Kinnikuman: Perfect Origin Arc | July 7, 2024 | September 22, 2024 | 12 | Production I.G | Based on the manga series by Yudetamago. | |
| 3 | As a Reincarnated Aristocrat, I'll Use My Appraisal Skill to Rise in the World (Season 2) | September 29, 2024 | December 22, 2024 | 12 | Studio Mother | Sequel to As a Reincarnated Aristocrat, I'll Use My Appraisal Skill to Rise in the World. | |
| SP (Note: Airs under the 'Agaru BL Night!' banner that features one-shot boys' love works.) | Neko ni Naritai Tamagawa-kun | January 5, 2025 | | 1 | Aeonium | Based on the manga series by Moto Tōno. | |
| 4 | Kinnikuman: Perfect Origin Arc (Season 2) | January 12, 2025 | March 30, 2025 | 11 | Production I.G | Sequel to Kinnikuman: Perfect Origin Arc. | |
| SP | A Love Too Captivating | April 6, 2025 | | 1 | Aeonium | Based on the manga series by Mia Sorahara. | |
| 5 | Go! Go! Loser Ranger! (Season 2) (Note: The first season aired from April 7 to June 30, 2024, on TBS and its affiliates, but at different times.) | April 13, 2025 | June 29, 2025 | 12 | Yostar Pictures | Based on the manga series by Negi Haruba. Sequel to Go! Go! Loser Ranger!. | |
| 6 | Gachiakuta | July 6, 2025 | December 22, 2025 | 24 | Bones Film | Based on the manga series by Kei Urana. | |
| 7 | Oedo Fire Slayer: The Legend of Phoenix | January 11, 2026 | April 5, 2026 | 12 | SynergySP | Based on the novel series by Shogo Imamura. | |
| 8 | The Classroom of a Black Cat and a Witch | April 12, 2026 | September 20, 2026 | 24 | Liden Films | Based on the manga series by Yōsuke Kaneda. | |
| 9 | As a Reincarnated Aristocrat, I'll Use My Appraisal Skill to Rise in the World (Season 3) | September 27, 2026 | December 2026 | TBA | GeyeG Pictures | Third season of As a Reincarnated Aristocrat, I'll Use My Appraisal Skill to Rise in the World. | |
| 10 | Inherit the Winds | January 2027 | TBA | TBA | Live2D Creative Studio; Drive | Original work. | |
| TBA | The Greatest Magicmaster's Retirement Plan | 2027 | TBA | TBA | Hotline | Based on the light novel series by Izushiro. | |

== See also ==
- Animated programming blocks in Japan
- Other anime programming blocks by JNN
  - Animeism, airing on Friday nights/Saturday mornings, and Thursday nights/Friday mornings on the Super Animeism TURBO block on MBS and TBS.
