= Perfect Propose =

Japanese manga series

- Cover of vol. 1 of the Japanese version, released on August 7, 2020

パーフェクトプロポーズ (Pāfekuto Puropōzu)
- Genre: Boys' love, iyashikei, romance
- Manga
- Written by: Mayo Tsurukame
- Published by: Kaiohsha
- English publisher: NA: Futekiya
- Imprint: Gush Comics
- Magazine: Gush
- Original run: May 7, 2019 – July 7, 2020
- Volumes: 1
- Television drama
- Directed by: Tadaaki Horai
- Produced by: Takeshi Katayama; Hiromi Nemoto; Tsugi Shikanai; Shinji Oomori
- Written by: Takeshi Miyamoto
- Studio: FAB
- Original network: Fuji TV On Demand; Fuji TV
- English network: GagaOOLala
- Original run: February 2, 2024 – March 1, 2024
- Episodes: 6
- icon

Perfect Propose (Japanese: パーフェクトプロポーズ, Hepburn: Pāfekuto Puropōzu) is a Japanese manga series by Mayo Tsurukame. It was serialized in the monthly boys' love manga magazine Gush from May 7, 2019, to July 7, 2020.

A live-action television drama adaptation was broadcast on Fuji TV On Demand from February 2, 2024, to March 1, 2024. The television drama was compiled and re-released as a theatrical film under the title Perfect Propose: Dream Edition.

== Plot ==
Hirokuni Watari is a salaryman who is constantly overworked at his job. One evening, Hirokuni is visited by Kai Fukaya, his younger childhood friend. Kai, who had made a marriage proposal to Hirokuni as a child 12 years ago, declares to him that he is gay. Having moved out of the family-owned restaurant he worked at after his boss was hospitalized, Kai has no place to live, and Hirokuni reluctantly allows him to stay in his apartment.

As Kai begins living with Hirokuni, he cooks and cleans for him, and gradually, Hirokuni's quality of life changes for the better. Over time, Hirokuni realizes he has grown fond of Kai; however, he continues to be stressed from being overworked, made worse by his demanding boss and his co-workers, Sakamoto and Kaneko, resigning. One day, Kai reveals that his boss will be released from the hospital and asks for Hirokuni's opinion on whether he should move back, but Hirokuni is unable to give him an answer.

Shortly after, Hirokuni finally finishes his company's project. When he returns home, Kai has already decided to move out. Hirokuni reveals to Kai that he returns his feelings romantically and persuades him to stay. Together, they remain in the apartment as a couple, while Kai works as his boss's successor and Hirokuni resigns from his company to work at Kaneko's newly established firm.

== Characters ==
Hirokuni Watari (渡 浩国, Watari Hirokuni)
Voiced by: Tomoaki Maeno (audio drama), Portrayed by: Junya Kaneko (TV drama)
Hirokuni is a salaryman who is overworked at his job. He works tiredly at a corrupt company, but he remains strong and unfettered.
Kai Fukaya (深谷 甲斐, Fukaya Kai)
Voiced by: Toshiki Masuda (audio drama), Portrayed by: Kouta Nomura (TV drama)
Kai is a man younger than Hirokuni who lived in his neighborhood when they were young. Kai is skilled in housekeeping and takes care of Hirokuni when he moves in with him. He is described as "cool-headed" and shows little emotion in his facial expressions and voice.
Kaneko (金子)
Voiced by: Daichi Kanbara (audio drama), Portrayed by: Jingi Irie (TV drama)
Kaneko is Hirokuni's co-worker and senior. He later resigns to start up his own company.
Sakamoto (坂本)
Portrayed by: Yuta Hayashi (TV drama)
Sakamoto is Hirokuni's co-worker. He becomes overwhelmed by work to the point where he later quits.
Female co-worker
Portrayed by: Ayane Kinoshita (TV drama)
One of Hirokuni's co-workers; she was named Hiyori (ひより) for the television drama adaptation.
Male co-worker
Portrayed by: Rio Takahashi (TV drama)
One of Hirokuni's co-workers; he was named Tatsumi (辰巳) for the television drama adaptation.
Boss
Portrayed by: Ryō Iwase (TV drama)
Named Sato (佐藤, Satō) in the television drama adaptation, he is Hirokuni's boss.

== Media ==
=== Manga ===
Perfect Propose was written and illustrated by Mayo Tsurukame. It was serialized in the monthly boys' love manga magazine Gush from the June 2019 issue released on May 7, 2019, to the August 2020 issue released on July 7, 2020. The chapters were later released in one bound volume by Kaiohsha under the Gush Comics imprint.

On October 8, 2021, Manga Planet announced that they had licensed Perfect Propose for their boys' love manga reading service, Futekiya. On July 24, 2025, they announced that they also would be releasing Perfect Propose in print.

No.	Original release date	Original ISBN	English release date	English ISBN
1	August 7, 2020	978-4-7964-1383-1	December 2021	—

=== Audio drama ===
An audio drama adaptation produced by Movic was released on CD on May 28, 2021, starring Toshiki Masuda as Kai and Tomoaki Maeno as Hirokuni.

=== Television drama ===
A live-action television drama adaptation of Perfect Propose was announced on October 12, 2023. The series was produced by FAB and premiered on February 2, 2024, on Fuji TV On Demand, Fuji TV's online streaming service. The series streamed weekly for a total of six episodes. A broadcast version, which cut some scenes, was later aired on Fuji TV's main channel on April 7, 2024. It was licensed in English by GagaOOLala.

The series stars Junya Kaneko as Hirokuni and Kouta Nomura as Kai. Kaneko had read the manga prior to auditioning for the television drama. While filming, Kaneko drew an "emotion meter" on his script to help him understand how strong Hirokuni's feelings for Kai were at the moment in the story. Nomura had no prior cooking experience and had to learn in preparing for the role, even consulting a food coordinator on making his cooking look appealing. The supporting cast includes Jingi Irie as Kaneko, Ayane Kinoshita as Hiyori, Rio Takahashi as Tatsumi, Yuta Hayashi as Sakamoto, and Ryō Iwase as Sato.

The television drama adaptation is directed by Tadaaki Horai. The screenplay is written by Takeshi Miyamoto. The opening theme is "Daydream" by Octpath.

The television drama adaptation was given a home release on Blu-ray and DVD on July 3, 2024. It was compiled and re-released as a theatrical film on October 25, 2024, under the title Perfect Propose: Dream Edition.

==== Episodes ====
No.	Title	Directed by	Written by	Original release date
1	"A Delicious Roommate Life"; Transliteration: "Oishii Doryo Seikatsu" (Japanese: おいしい同居生活)	Tadaaki Horai	Takeshi Miyamoto	February 2, 2024 (online streaming); April 7, 2024 (television broadcast)
2	"Yakisoba and the Summer Festival"; Transliteration: "Yakisoba to Natsu Matsuri" (Japanese: 焼きそばと夏祭り)	Tadaaki Horai	Takeshi Miyamoto	February 2, 2024 (online streaming); April 14, 2024 (television broadcast)
3	"First Time Sleeping Together"; Transliteration: "Hajimete no Soine" (Japanese: 初めての添い寝)	Tadaaki Horai	Takeshi Miyamoto	February 9, 2024 (online streaming); April 21, 2024 (television broadcast)
4	"First Love and Drunken Tears"; Transliteration: "Hatsukoi to Yopparai no Namida" (Japanese: 初恋と酔っぱらいの涙)	Tadaaki Horai	Takeshi Miyamoto	February 9, 2024 (online streaming); April 28, 2024 (television broadcast)
5	"Our Time Limit"; Transliteration: "Futari no Taimu Rimitto" (Japanese: 二人のタイムリミット)	Tadaaki Horai	Takeshi Miyamoto	February 16, 2024 (online streaming); May 5, 2024 (television broadcast)
6	"Sunday, First Morning"; Transliteration: "Nichiyōbi, Hajimari no Asa" (Japanese: 日曜日、はじまりの朝)	Tadaaki Horai	Takeshi Miyamoto	February 16, 2024 (online streaming); May 12, 2024 (television broadcast)

== Reception ==
In June 2024, Perfect Propose sold over 210,000 physical copies. By November 2024, the series sold over 250,000 physical copies. Perfect Propose ranked within the top 5 in the boys' love category in the Everyone Chooses!! Digital Comic Awards 2022.

The Television praised the live-action television drama adaptation, complimenting how Kai's affection for Hirokuni was portrayed and Hirokuni's strength in moments of weakness. It ranked within the top 10 on Fuji TV On Demand during its initial broadcast, as well as no. 1 in Fuji TV On Demand's boys' love weekly viewer rankings. It also ranked no. 1 in all regions on GagaOOLala during broadcast.
