= Limit (manga) =

Japanese manga series

- Cover of the first manga volume

リミット (Rimitto)
- Genre: Suspense
- Manga
- Written by: Keiko Suenobu
- Published by: Kodansha
- English publisher: NA: Vertical
- Magazine: Bessatsu Friend
- Original run: October 13, 2009 – September 13, 2011
- Volumes: 6
- Television drama
- Music by: Kōji Endō
- Original network: TV Tokyo
- Original run: July 12, 2013 – September 27, 2013
- Episodes: 12

Limit (Japanese: リミット, Hepburn: Rimitto) is a Japanese manga series written and illustrated by Keiko Suenobu.

== Plot ==
This manga focuses on Mizuki Konno, a high school junior. She and her class are on the way to a school camp when the bus driver passes out and causes the bus to drop from a cliff. Konno is one of only six survivors of the accident, all of them pupils. Due to the remoteness of the site of the accident, they are unable to reach safety, and their mobile phones have no reception. Thus they have to survive in the wilderness for several days until rescue arrives. They can only succeed by working together, but this is complicated by old rivalries and animosities between the characters from their school life before the accident. One of them was bullied by her classmates and now sees the chance to get her revenge, while Konno’s former aloofness now works against her. Before long, the pupils turn against each other, eventually resulting in the death of one of them.

== Live-action ==
A live-action drama version of the manga aired on TV Tokyo between July 12, 2013, and September 27, 2013.

Cast

- Nanami Sakuraba as Mizuki Konno
- Tao Tsuchiya as Chieko Kamiya
- Rio Yamashita as Arisa Morishige
- Ayano Kudo as Haru Ichinose
- Yuka Masuda as Chikage Usui
- Katsuhiro Suzuki as Haruaki Hinata
- Riho Takada as Sakura Himesawa
- Masataka Kubota as Wataru Igarashi
- Ikkei Watanabe as Hirokazu Konno

Kurtuluş Lisesi, a Turkish television series adaptation was announced in August 2021. The series had aired on the Turkish digital streaming platform GAIN in January, 2024.

== Reception ==
Carlo Santos of Anime News Network (ANN) gave volume 1 a B−. Rebecca Silverman, also of ANN, gave it a B.

By July 17, 2011, volume 5 had sold 30,934 copies in Japan. By December 18, 2011, volume 6 had sold 32,754 copies in Japan. In the week of October 14 to 20, 2012, volume 1 ranked in second place in the list of The New York Times Manga Best Sellers. It has sold 10 million copies in Japan.
