= A Love Too Captivating =

Japanese manga series

- First tankōbon volume cover

たまらないのは恋なのか (Tamaranai no wa Koi nano ka)
- Genre: Boys' love
- Manga
- Written by: Mia Sorahana
- Published by: Kodansha
- English publisher: NA: Kodansha USA
- Imprint: Kodansha Comics Betsufure
- Magazine: Bessatsu Friend
- Original run: July 13, 2023 – present
- Volumes: 7
- Anime television film
- Directed by: Zi Hao Jia
- Written by: Kōhei Iwamura
- Studio: Aeonium
- Original network: JNN (CBC TV, TBS)
- Released: April 6, 2025
- Runtime: 13 minutes

A Love Too Captivating (たまらないのは恋なのか, Tamaranai no wa Koi nano ka) is a Japanese manga series written and illustrated by Mia Sorahana. It began serialization in Kodansha's shōjo manga magazine Bessatsu Friend in July 2023. An anime television special adaptation produced by Aeonium premiered in April 2025.

== Synopsis ==
Misuzu is a delinquent who tries to avoid getting in a fight, but ends up getting involved frequently. One day, he sees some delinquents trying to pick on honor student Kitahara, which leads to Misuzu defending him against the delinquents. Afterwards, Kitahara becomes interested in Misuzu and starts to follow him much to Misuzu's annoyance.

== Characters ==
Riku Kitahara (北原陸, Kitahara Riku)
Voiced by: Takeo Ōtsuka
Aoba Misuzu (美澄青羽, Misuzu Aoba)
Voiced by: Chiaki Kobayashi

== Media ==
=== Manga ===
Written and illustrated by Mia Sorahana, A Love Too Captivating began serialization in Kodansha's shōjo manga magazine Bessatsu Friend on July 13, 2023. Its chapters have been collected in seven tankōbon volumes as of July 2026.

The series' chapters are simultaneously published in English on Kodansha's K Manga app. During their panel at New York Comic Con 2025, Kodansha USA announced that they had licensed the series for English publication.

No.	Original release date	Original ISBN	North American release date	North American ISBN
1	December 12, 2023	978-4-06-533970-1	December 22, 2026	978-1-64-729629-2
2	May 13, 2024	978-4-06-535602-9	March 16, 2027	978-1-64-729635-3
3	October 11, 2024	978-4-06-537238-8	—	—
4	March 13, 2025	978-4-06-538815-0	—	—
5	September 12, 2025	978-4-06-540783-7; 978-4-06-540803-2 (SEM); 978-4-06-540802-5 (SEK)	—	—
6	February 13, 2026	978-4-06-542497-1	—	—
7	July 13, 2026	978-4-06-544394-1	—	—

=== Anime ===
An anime television special adaptation produced by Aeonium aired on the Agaru Anime programming block under the 'Agaru BL Night!' banner on CBC, TBS, and their affiliate stations on April 6, 2025.
