= Bessatsu Friend =

Japanese manga magazine

- Cover of the January 2007 issue of Bessatsu Friend, featuring Sprout
- Categories: Shōjo manga
- Frequency: Monthly
- Circulation: 11,000; (July–September 2026)
- First issue: March 1965
- Company: Kodansha
- Country: Japan
- Based in: Tokyo
- Language: Japanese
- Website: betsufure.net

Bessatsu Friend (Japanese: 別冊フレンド, Hepburn: Bessatsu Furendo), formerly known as Bessatsu Shōjo Friend (別冊少女フレンド, Bessatsu Shōjo Furendo), is a Japanese shōjo manga magazine published by Kodansha. It was originally conceived as a bessatsu, or companion magazine, to Shōjo Friend, which is no longer published. Bessatsu Friend is commonly known by the abbreviated name Betsufure (別フレ) and is published on the 13th of each month.

The magazine originally featured manga focused on romance, but with the start of publications by manga artists like Keiko Suenobu, it began publishing series that moved away from romance as a main focus. Betsufure publishes manga by many well known manga artists, such as Miwa Ueda, Satomi Ikezawa, Ayu Watanabe, Fuyumi Soryo, Nanba Atsuko, and Keiko Suenobu.

In October 2005, a manga serialized in Bessatsu Friend titled Flower of Eden was pulled from publication and recalled by both Kodansha and North American publisher Tokyopop, after it was revealed that the manga artist, Yuki Suetsugu, had copied art directly from Slam Dunk and Real by Takehiko Inoue. After that, official imports of Bessatsu Friend publications became scarce.

== Serialization ==
=== Current ===
- When We're in Love (2011–present)
- A Girl & Her Guard Dog (2018–present)
- Yamaguchi-kun Isn't So Bad (2019–present)
- You're My Cutie!! (2020–present)
- Glasses with a Chance of Delinquent (2021–present)
- Gazing at the Star Next Door (2022–present)
- L DK Pink (2022–present)
- A Love Too Captivating (2023–present)

=== Past ===
==== 1977–1989 ====
- Akogare (1970)
- Lady Love (1981–1984)

==== 1990–1999 ====
- Mars (1996–2000)
- Peach Girl (1997–2003)
- Guru Guru Pon-chan (1998–2000)
- Girl Got Game (1999–2002)

==== 2000–2009 ====
- Flower of Eden (2000–2004)
- The Wallflower (2000–2015)
- A Perfect Day for Love Letters (2001)
- Othello (2001–2004)
- Pink no Idenshi (2002–2005)
- My Heavenly Hockey Club (2002–2005)
- Life (2002–2009)
- Senpai to Kanojo (2004–2005)
- Peach Girl: Sae's Story (2004–2006)
- Drowning Love (2004–2013)
- Love Attack! (2004–2009)
- Sprout (2005–2008)
- A Song to the Sun (2006)
- Minima! (2006–2008)
- Papillon (2007–2009)
- Tonari no 801-chan: Fujoshiteki Kōkō Seikatsu (2007–2009)
- Love's Reach (2008–2011)
- L DK (2009–2017)
- Limit (2009–2011)

==== 2010–2019 ====
- Kyō no Kira-kun (2012–2014)
- My Boy in Blue (2013–2020)
- Kiss Him, Not Me (2013–2018)
- Defying Kurosaki-kun (2014–2021)
- Kiss Me at the Stroke of Midnight (2015–2020)
- Cells at Work and Friends! (2019–2021)
- Star-Crossed!! (2019–2020)

==== 2020–2029 ====
- My Girlfriend's Child (2021–2024)
- I See Your Face, Turned Away (2022–2026)

== Related magazines ==
- Nakayoshi
- Shōjo Friend
- Suspense & Horror
- Dessert
