= Yuki Suetsugu =

Japanese manga artist

- Born: September 8, 1975 (age 51); Fukuoka Prefecture, Japan
- Occupation: Manga artist
- Years active: 1992–present
- Known for: Chihayafuru
- Children: 4

Yuki Suetsugu (Japanese: 末次由紀, Hepburn: Suetsugu Yuki; born September 8, 1975) is a Japanese manga artist.

== Career ==
She debuted in 1992 in Kodansha's Nakayoshi magazine with Taiyō no Romance. Her works later moved to Bessatsu Friend magazine, also published by Kodansha. Her career was put on hiatus in October 2005, after she was discovered to have plagiarized other artists, including tracing others' work. She later resumed her work in March 2007.

On March 24, 2009, her work Chihayafuru was chosen for the Manga Taishō.

== Selected works ==
- Kimi no Shiroi Hane (君の白い羽根), 1995, serialized in Bessatsu Friend
- Kono mune no Sunao (この胸の素直), 1996, serialized in Bessatsu Friend
- Promise, 1996, serialized in Bessatsu Friend
- Only You - Tobenai Tsubasa (Only You-翔べない翼-), 1997–2000, serialized in Bessatsu Friend, published in 8 volumes
- Kimi no Kuroi Hane (君の黒い羽根), 1998
- Itoshii Kimi (いとしいキミ), 1998–1999, serialized in Bessatsu Friend Juliet DX
- Flower of Eden (エデンの花, Eden no Hana), 2000–2004, serialized in Bessatsu Friend, published in 12 volumes (Completed, but later removed from stores and taken out of print because of plagiarism)
- Silver, 2004–2005, serialized in Bessatsu Friend, published in 2 volumes (Canceled when earlier plagiarism came to light)
- 100% no Kimi e (100%の君へ), published in 2 volumes
- Kimi wa Boku no Kagayakeru Hoshi (君は僕の輝ける星)
- Kimi no Tame no Nani mo Kamo (君のための何もかも)
- Chihayafuru (ちはやふる), 2007–2022, serialized in Be Love, published in 50 volumes
- Couverture (クーベルチュール), since 2009, serialized in Be Love, published in 2 volumes
- Chihayafuru plus Kimi ga Tame (ちはやふる plus きみがため), since 2023, serialized in Be Love
