= Be Love =

Japanese manga magazine

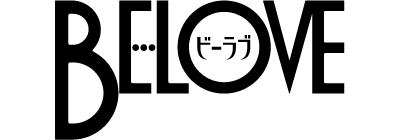

- Cover of the December 15, 2017 issue of Be Love, featuring Chihayafuru
- Categories: Josei manga
- Frequency: Monthly (1980–1982, 2018–present); Biweekly (1982–2018)
- Circulation: 25,500; (July–September 2026)
- Founded: September 1980
- Company: Kodansha
- Country: Japan
- Based in: Tokyo
- Language: Japanese
- Website: be-love.jp

Be Love is a Japanese monthly (biweekly May 1982 – December 2018) josei manga magazine published by Kodansha. It debuted in September 1980. It is one of the leading manga magazines for adult women, the second of its kind (the first being Petit Comic published by Shogakukan), and was instrumental in the rising popularity of josei manga in the 1980s, which led to the creation of other magazines targeted at women such as You and Big Comic for Lady. As of 2003, Be Love, like You and Jour, published stories focusing on "the reality of everyday life" experienced by its readers.

As of 1997, the magazine's readers are mostly working women and housewives, but students made up 8% of readership in that year.

== Circulation figures ==
The magazine first appeared as Be in Love but was renamed in 1982. From 1995 to 2000, sales were at around 270,000–280,000 per issue. In 2006 and 2007, Be Love had a circulation of about 200,000 copies. In 2008, it had a circulation of 182,667 copies. In 2009, it had a circulation of 173,125 copies; in 2010, 153,792 copies, and in 2015, 106,834 copies.

As of 1997, the magazine's readers are mostly working women and housewives, but students made up 8% of readership in that year.

== Series ==
=== Ongoing series ===
- Chihayafuru plus Kimi ga Tame by Yuki Suetsugu (since 2023)
- Couverture by Yuki Suetsugu (since 2009)
- Kamakura Bake Neko Club by Daisuke Igarashi (since 2022)
- Matcha Made in Heaven by Umebachi Yamanaka
- Nina the Starry Bride by Rikaichi (since 2019)
- Seito Shokun! Kids by Yōko Shōji (since 2019)
- Something's Wrong with Us by Natsumi Ando (since 2016)
- Tsukuyomi-kun no Kindan Oyashoku by Nikki Asada (since 2021)

=== Past series ===
- Aishite Sou Rou by Yuu Azuki
- Aishiteru: Kaiyō by Minoru Itō (2006–2007)
- Aka-chan no Host by Ai Okaue
- Akuryou-sama Oteyawaraka ni by Chikako Kikukawa
- Asameshimae by Kita Komao
- Atokata no Machi by Yuki Ozawa
- Bara to Saiaku no Tamashii by Satosumi Takaguchi
- Chihayafuru by Yuki Suetsugu (2007–2022)
- Chihayafuru: Chuugakusei-hen by Yui Tokiumi, Oto Tooda
- Daisuki!! Yuzu no Kosodate Nikki by Mizuho Aimoto (2005–2012)
- Door wo Aketara Satsui by Chikako Kikukawa
- Eien no Yuuwaku
- Fukufuku Fu-nya~n by Kanata Konami
- Fukufuku Fu-nya~n: Koneko da Nyan by Konami Kanata
- Fukufuku Fu-nya~n New by Kanata Konami
- Galboy! by Mariko Nakamura (1988–1998)
- Glass no Isu by Mariko Nakamura
- Haiji to Yamao by Natsumi Ando
- Haru Koi by Yuki Suetsugu (2007)
- Himawari!!: Sorekawa no Daisuki!! by Mizuho Aimoto
- It's All About the Looks by Hiromi Ookubo (2013–2017)
- Houkago Karte by Mayu Hinase
- Ishtar no Musume: Ono Otsuu Den by Waki Yamato
- Junjou no Susume by Miki Wakabayashi
- Kagami no Mae de Aimashou by Eri Sakai
- Kentaro Hiyama's First Pregnancy by Eri Sakai (2012, 2023)
- Kentaro Hiyama's Pregnancy: Childcare Edition by Eri Sakai (2019–2020)
- Kiko-chan's Smile by Tsubasa Nunoura (1996–2001)
- Kosodate Tantan by Banana Nangoku
- Kumo Ichizoku to Doro Girl by Emi Mitsuki
- Kurenai Niou by Waki Yamato
- Lady Love: Aisuru Anata e by Hiromu Ono (2005–2010)
- Meiji Hiiro Kitan by Rikachi
- Meiji Melancholia by Rikachi
- Minamoto Hakase no Ijou na xx by Miyuki Yorita
- Momokan by Kikuno Shirakawa
- Navigatoria by Nikki Asada
- Nishi Muku Samurai by Waki Yamato
- Noh-men Joshi no Hanako-san by Ryō Oda (2018–2023; transferred from Itan)
- Okoshiyasu, Chitose-chan by Yukiko Natsume
- Onna no Ie by Akane Torikai
- Otomurai-san by Noriko Ootani
- Peach Girl Next by Miwa Ueda (2016–2019)
- Pikupiku Sentarou by Tsubasa Nunoura
- Saihate Arcade by Arinaga Ine, Youko Ogawa
- Sanju Mariko by Yuki Ozawa (2016–2021)
- Sankaku Yanemachi Apartment by Sakura Fujisue
- Satsujin Sales by Chikako Kikukawa
- Seito Shokun! Kyōshi-hen by Yōko Shōji (2004–2011)
- Seito Shokun! Saishū-shō: Tabidachi by Yōko Shōji (2011-2019)
- Shikatsushi: Joou no Houigaku by Aki Morino
- Shoujo Manga wa Okirai desu ka? by You Morita
- Shouwa Fanfare by Rikachi
- Shunkashuutou Days by Sakura Fujisue
- Shura no Dress by Miyuki Yorita
- Sukutte Goran by Noriko Ootani
- Tasogare Takako by Kiwa Irie
- Uchi no Sensei by Yuu Hanazuka
- Waru by Jun Fukami (1988–1997)
- Watashi no Tadashii Onii-chan by Satoshi Mori
- Watashitachi wa Douka shiteiru by Natsumi Ando
- Yandeka by Miyuki Yorita
- Yonimo Fujitsu na Piano Sonata by Hal Osaka
- Yuria-sensei no Akai Ito by Kiwa Irie (2018–2022)
- Zephyrus no Mori by Waki Yamato
