= Yumiko Ōshima =

Japanese manga artist

- Born: August 31, 1947 (age 79); Otawara, Tochigi, Japan
- Occupation: Manga artist

Yumiko Ōshima (大島弓子, Ōshima Yumiko; born August 31, 1947) is a Japanese manga artist and is associated with the Year 24 group that heavily influenced the development of shōjo manga in the 1970s.

== Career ==
She made her debut as a professional manga artist in 1968 with the short story "Paula no Namida" in the magazine Weekly Margaret. She became known for publishing short stories for this and other major magazines targeted at girls like Shōjo Comic, Bessatsu Shōjo Comic, Seventeen and Shōjo Friend. One of her short stories appeared in Funny, one of the earliest magazines for josei manga (then called "women's gekiga"). Her series Tanjō!, published from 1970 until 1971, gained attention for its depiction of teenage pregnancy. From 1978 until 1987 she published her most famous series The Star of Cottonland in LaLa.

== Style ==
According to Mizuki Takahashi, Ōshima is considered the most influential artist of the Year 24 group because of her visual innovation in shōjo manga, especially in panel design around representing emotions in drawing. Ōshima often places text that represents inner monologue outside of speech bubbles and instead flowing freely. She also was innovative in giving panels a delicate, thin frame that is at times even broken. Takahashi writes: "The panels are not sequential, which forces readers to look at the whole page in order to understand the atmosphere of a scene rather than just read ahead in the story."

Many of her stories are centered on girls' anxieties during adolescence, the difficulties of dealing with becoming an adult physically and emotionally and needing to suppress one's child self.

== Reception and legacy ==
She received the 1973 Japan Cartoonists Association Award for excellence for Mimoza Yakata de Tsukamaete. She received the 1978 Kodansha Manga Award for shōjo for The Star of Cottonland, and the 2008 Tezuka Osamu Cultural Prize Short Story Award for "Cher Gou-Gou...mon petit chat, mon petit ami," a short story in the ongoing series Gū-gū Datte Neko de aru. In 2021, she was honoured with the title Person of Cultural Merit.

She is credited with popularizing the kemonomimi (catgirl) character type through her creation of Chibi-neko from The Star of Cottonland.

Several artists have been influenced by her work. Manga artist Fusako Kuramochi and writer Banana Yoshimoto cite her as an influence. Manga critic Tomoko Yamada cites "Natsu no owari no totancho" (1977) as one of her favorite manga.

== Selected works ==
- Paula no Namida (ポーラの涙; "Paula's Tears"), 1968
- Tanjō! (誕生!), 1970–1971
- Sakura Jikan (桜時間; "Cherry Blossom Time"), 1972
- Mimoza-yakata de Tsukamaete (ミモザ館でつかまえて), 1973
- Joka e ("To Joker") (1973) – An allegorical love triangle involving a boy who is accidentally transformed into a girl
- Nazuna yo Nazuna (なずなよなずな), 1974
- Ichigo Monogatari (いちご物語; "Strawberry Story"), 1975
- Freud-shiki Ranmaru (F式蘭丸), 1975
- Shichigatsu Nanoka ni (七月七日に), 1976
- Banana Bread no Pudding (バナナブレッドのプディング), 1977–1978 – A story about a sensitive young woman, Ira Miura, who wishes to have a gay boyfriend
- The Star of Cottonland (綿の国星, Wata no Kuni Hoshi), 1978–1987 – A story about a kitten, Chibi-neko, who thinks she is a little girl
- Akasuika Kisuika (赤すいか黄すいか), 1979
- Kinpatsu no Sōgen (金髪の草原), 1983
- Mainichi ga Natsuyasumi (毎日が夏休み), 1989
- Koi wa Newton no Ringo (恋はニュートンのリンゴ), 1990
- Christmas no Kiseki (クリスマスの奇跡), 1995
- Gū-gū datte Neko de aru (グーグーだって猫である), 1996–ongoing
