= Kaiōki =

Japanese manga series

海皇紀
- Genre: Adventure, fantasy, kendo
- Manga
- Written by: Masatoshi Kawahara
- Published by: Kodansha
- Original run: 1998 – 2010
- Volumes: 45

Kaiōki (海皇紀; lit. "Tale of the Sea Emperor") is a Japanese manga series written and illustrated by Masatoshi Kawahara. The manga was licensed and published in Taiwan by Tong Li Publishing.

== Reception ==
The thirty-sixth volume of Kaiouki was ranked 9th on the Tohan charts. The thirty-seventh volume was ranked 10th. The thirty-eighth volume was ranked 9th. The thirty-ninth volume was ranked 10th. The fortieth volume was ranked 11th.
