= Ryōtarō Shiba =

Japanese writer (1923–1996)

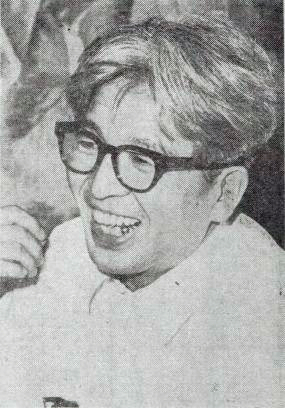
- Ryōtarō Shiba in 1964
- Born: August 7, 1923; Osaka, Japan
- Died: February 12, 1996 (aged 72); Osaka, Japan
- Occupation: Writer
- Writing career
- Genres: historical novel, detective fiction

Teiichi Fukuda (福田 定一; August 7, 1923 – February 12, 1996), also known as Ryōtarō Shiba (司馬 遼太郎), was a Japanese author. He is best known for his novels about historical events in Japan and on the Northeast Asian sub-continent, as well as his historical and cultural essays pertaining to Japan and its relationship to the rest of the world.

== Career ==
Shiba took his pen name from Sima Qian, the great Han dynasty historian (Shiba is the Japanese rendition of Sima). He studied Mongolian at the Osaka School of Foreign Languages (now the School of Foreign Studies at Osaka University) and began his career as a journalist with the Sankei Shimbun, one of Japan's major newspapers. After World War II Shiba began writing historical novels. The magazine Shukan Asahi (ja:週刊朝日) printed Shiba's articles about his travels within Japan in a series that ran for 1,146 installments. Shiba received the Naoki Prize for the 1959 novel Fukurō no Shiro ("Castle of Owls"). In 1993 Shiba received the Government's Order of Cultural Merit. Shiba was a prolific author who frequently wrote about the dramatic change Japan went through during the late Edo and early Meiji periods. His most monumental works include Kunitori Monogatari, Ryoma ga Yuku (see below), Moeyo Ken, and Saka no Ue no Kumo, all of which have spawned dramatizations, most notably Taiga dramas aired in hour-long segments over a full year on NHK television. He also wrote numerous essays that were published in collections, one of which—Kaidō wo Yuku—is a multi-volume journal-like work covering his travels across Japan and around the world. Shiba is widely appreciated for the originality of his analyses of historical events, and many people in Japan have read at least one of his works.

Several of Shiba's works have been translated into English, including Drunk as a Lord: Samurai Stories (2001), his fictionalized biographies of Kukai (Kukai the Universal: Scenes from His Life, 2003) and Tokugawa Yoshinobu (The Last Shogun: The Life of Tokugawa Yoshinobu, 2004), as well as The Tatar Whirlwind: A Novel of Seventeenth-Century East Asia (2007) and Clouds Above the Hill (2012, 2013, 2014).

== Ryōma Goes His Way ==
One of Shiba's best known works, Ryōma Goes His Way (竜馬がゆく, Ryōma ga Yuku), is a historical novel about Sakamoto Ryōma, a samurai who was instrumental in bringing about Japan's Meiji Restoration, after which values and elements from Western culture were introduced into the country, sparking dramatic change. The late Edo period was a very confused time when the country split into two factions. Japan had banned international trade for over two hundred years and isolated itself from the rest of the world. During the Edo period, the Japanese government, which was led by the Tokugawa clan, had agreed to open the country to trade with the United States and several European countries. However, many people were against this and they started a movement called Sonnō-Jōi (revere the emperor and expel the barbarians). They believed that they should stand up and fight the foreigners to protect the country from outside domination. The Tokugawa had usurped political power from the emperor, but he was still considered by many to be the sacred symbol of Japan. To protect the country, the Sonnō-Jōi faction sought to restore the emperor's political authority by overthrowing the Tokugawa shogunate. Partisans of these two political institutions caused civil war-like confusion, and assassinations were frequent.

In Ryōma ga Yuku, Sakamoto Ryōma, the protagonist, starts out as a member of the Sonnō-Jōi faction but gradually realizes that people need to realize how much stronger other countries have grown during Japan's two centuries of national seclusion. Japan was almost powerless in the face of the technology and well-developed industry of the contemporary Western powers. He believed that Japan needed to adopt elements of Western culture to develop into a country that could stand equally among nations.

Sakamoto Ryōma was not well known in Japan prior to the publication of Ryōma ga Yuku. Ryōma ga Yuku is Shiba's best selling work in Japanese, with 21,250,000 copies sold.

== Kaidō wo Yuku ==
Kaidō wo Yuku (街道をゆく; "On the highways") is a series of travel essays initially published in Shūkan Asahi, a weekly magazine, from 1971 until 1996. Shiba wrote the series with an intercultural perspective, making observations about the history, geography, and people of the places he visited. Though mostly about different areas of Japan, the series includes several volumes on foreign lands as well—China, Korea, the Namban countries (Spain and Portugal), Ireland, the Netherlands, Mongolia, Taiwan, and New York.

The work, now available in multi-volume book form, was also developed into documentary series and broadcast on NHK, Japan's public television broadcaster.

The series ran for 1,146 installments.

== Clouds Above the Hill ==
Another well-known work, Clouds Above the Hill (坂の上の雲, Saka no Ue no Kumo), is a historical epic centering on the careers of two ambitious brothers who work their way up from a rural backwater to positions of eminence in the new post-1868 Meiji period. In it, the Akiyama brothers strive to build a Japanese military capable of holding its own in an unstable region and the Russo-Japanese War becomes the central stage for their involvement in the frenzied modernisation and ascendancy of Japan in the region and subsequently, the world. It is Shiba's second best selling work in Japanese, with 14,750,000 copies sold.

== Battles of Khalkhin Gol ==
Shiba began working on a novel based on the Battles of Khalkhin Gol and conducted research. However, as he delved deeper into his research, his motivation to write dwindled.

"I started hating being Japanese."
"I can't understand this country Japan, which engages in such foolish acts."

In the end, he gave up writing of the novel.

== Death ==
Shiba suffered internal bleeding and lapsed into a coma on February 10, 1996. He died two days later.

== Works ==
=== Novels ===
- Fukurō no Shiro (1959)
- Zeeroku Bushido (上方武士道, 1960)
- Kaze no Bushi (1961)
- Senun no yume (戦雲の夢, 1961)
- Fujin no mon (風神の門, 1962)
- Ryoma ga Yuku (竜馬がゆく, 1963–66)
- Moeyo Ken (1964)
- Shirikurae Magoichi (尻啖え孫市, 1964)
- Komyo ga tsuji (功名が辻, 1965)
- Shiro wo toru hanashi (城をとる話, 1965)
- Kunitori monogatari (国盗り物語, 1965)
- Yotte soro (酔って候, 1965), published in English as Drunk as a Lord
- Hokuto no hito (北斗の人, 1966)
- Niwaka Naniwa yukyoden (俄 浪華遊侠伝, 1966)
- Sekigahara (関ヶ原, 1966)
- Jūichibanme no shishi (十一番目の志士, 1967)
- Saigo no Shōgun (最後の将軍, 1967), translated into English as The Last Shogun: The Life of Tokugawa Yoshinobu , (ISBN 1568363567) about Tokugawa Yoshinobu.
- Junshi (殉死, 1967)
- Natsukusa no fu (夏草の賦, 1968)
- Shinshi taikoki (新史太閤記, 1968)
- Yoshitsune (義経, 1968)
- Touge (峠, 1968)
- Musashi (武蔵, 1968)
- Saka no ue no kumo (1969), translated into English as Clouds Above the Hill (ISBN 1138911968), a work of historical fiction about the Russo-Japanese War.
- Yōkai (妖怪, 1969)
- Daitōzenshi (大盗禅師, 1969)
- Saigetsu (歳月, 1969)
- Yoni sumu hibi (世に棲む日日, 1971)
- Jousai (城塞, 1971–72)
- Kashin (花神, 1972)
- Haō no ie (覇王の家, 1973)
- Harimanada monogatari (播磨灘物語, 1975)
- Tobu ga gotoku (翔ぶが如く, 1975–76)
- Kūkai no fukei (空海の風景, 1975), translated into English as Kukai the Universal: Scenes from his Life (ISBN 4925080474) about the great Japanese monk Kukai who founded the Shingon school and is said to have invented the Japanese kana writing system.
- Kochō no yume (胡蝶の夢, 1979)
- Kouu to Ryūhō (項羽と劉邦, 1980)
- Hitobito no ashioto (ひとびとの跫音, 1981)
- Nanohana no oki (菜の花の沖, 1982)
- Hakone no saka (箱根の坂, 1984)
- Dattan shippuroku (韃靼疾風録, 1987), translated into English as The Tatar Whirlwind: A Novel of Seventeenth-Century East Asia (ISBN 1891640461), about the decline of the Ming dynasty, the rise of the Manchus and the interplay of these two periods in China's history with Tokugawa Japan.

=== Manga ===
- Moeyo Ken (2021–present) (written by Emeru Komatsu and illustrated by Yoshiki Kanata; serialized on Comic Bunch Kai)
- Ryōma ga Yuku (2022–present) (illustrated by Yū Suzunoki; serialized on Shūkan Bunshun)

== Honours ==
- Naoki Prize (1960)
- Kikuchi Kan Prize (1966)
- Yomiuri Prize (1981)
- Asahi Prize (1982)
- Person of Cultural Merit (1991)
- Order of Culture (1993)
- Junior Third Rank (1996, Posthumous)

== See also ==
- Japanese literature
- Taiga drama
- Ōkunitama Shrine
