= Sunday vs Magazine: Shūketsu! Chōjō Daikessen =

2009 video game

Sunday VS Magazine: Shūketsu! Chōjō Daikessen
- Developers: Konami Computer Entertainment Aomori; Hudson Soft
- Publisher: Konami
- Director: Toshiharu Honda
- Producer: Shin Murato
- Artist: Aika Yamaguchi
- Composers: Tatsuya Fujiwara; Seiichi Takamoto; Hiroyuki Andō; Daisuke Miyake
- Platform: PlayStation Portable
- Release: JP: March 26, 2009
- Genre: Fighting
- Modes: Single-player, multiplayer

Sunday VS Magazine: Shūketsu! Chōjō Daikessen (サンデー VS マガジン 集結！ 頂上大決戦, Sandē Bāsasu Magajin Shūketsu! Chōjō Daikessen) is a fighting game developed by Konami Computer Entertainment Aomori and Hudson Soft and published by Konami for the PlayStation Portable (PSP). The game celebrates the 50th anniversaries of shōnen manga magazines Weekly Shōnen Sunday and Weekly Shōnen Magazine published by Shogakukan and Kodansha, respectively, featuring prominent manga characters from both publications as playable fighters.

== Playable characters ==
=== Weekly Shōnen Sunday characters ===
- Hayate Ayasaki (Hayate the Combat Butler)
- Inuyasha (Inuyasha)
- Kaoru Akashi (Zettai Karen Children)
- Kenichi Shirahama (Kenichi: The Mightiest Disciple)
- Kosuke Ueki (The Law of Ueki)
- Miu Fūrinji (Kenichi: The Mightiest Disciple)
- R. Ichiro Tanaka (Kyūkyoku Chōjin R)
- Recca Hanabishi (Flame of Recca)
- Ryo Takatsuki (Project ARMS)
- Noboru Takizawa (Honō no Tenkōsei)
- Tokine Yukimura (Kekkaishi)
- Ushio Aotsuki (Ushio and Tora)
- Yaiba Kurogane (Yaiba)
- Yoshimori Sumimura (Kekkaishi)

=== Weekly Shōnen Magazine characters ===
- Akira Fudo (Devilman)
- Ban Midou (GetBackers)
- Demon Eyes Kyo (Samurai Deeper Kyo)
- Ippo Makunouchi (Hajime no Ippo)
- Itsuki Minami (Air Gear)
- Joe Shimamura (Cyborg 009)
- Joe Yabuki (Ashita no Joe)
- Kōtarō Shindō (Kōtarō Makaritōru!)
- Lucy Heartfilia (Fairy Tail)
- Mamoru Takamura (Hajime no Ippo)
- Naoto Date (Tiger Mask)
- Natsu Dragneel (Fairy Tail)
- Negi Springfield (Negima! Magister Negi Magi)
- Ringo Noyamano (Air Gear)
- Shinichi Mechazawa (Cromartie High School)
