= Wata no Kunihoshi =

Japanese manga series

- First bunkoban volume cover, featuring Chibi-neko

綿の国星
- Genre: Psychological; Philosophical
- Manga
- Written by: Yumiko Ōshima
- Published by: Hakusensha
- Magazine: LaLa
- Original run: 1978 – 1987
- Volumes: 7
- Anime film
- Directed by: Shinichi Tsuji
- Written by: Masaki Tsuji; Yumiko Ōshima
- Music by: Richard Clayderman
- Studio: Mushi Production
- Released: February 11, 1984
- Runtime: 92 minutes

Wata no Kunihoshi (綿の国星; "Cotton's Country Star" or "Planet of Cotton Country") is a Japanese manga series written and illustrated by Yumiko Ōshima. It was serialized by Hakusensha in LaLa magazine from 1978 to 1987 and collected in seven tankōbon volumes. The story is about an abandoned kitten called Chibi-neko (drawn as a small girl with cat ears and a tail) who is adopted by a young man named Tokio; Chibi-neko grows up believing that she is human.

The series was adapted as an anime movie directed by Shinichi Tsuji and produced by Mushi Production, it was released in theaters in February 1984.

In 1979, Wata no Kunihoshi received the 3rd Kodansha Manga Award for the shōjo category. It is credited with popularizing catgirls in anime and manga.

== Synopsis ==
A two-month-old kitten, Chibi-neko (チビ猫), was abandoned by her owners. An 18-year-old young man named Tokio finds Chibi-neko and brings her home. Although his mother is allergic to cats and fears them, she agrees to let him keep the kitten for the company because she is afraid that he has become too withdrawn after having failed his university entrance exams.

Soon, Chibi-neko falls in love with Tokio. In her mind, Chibi-neko is a young human who speaks the human language, even though people only seem to hear her cat meows. She believes that all humans were once kittens like her. When she realizes that Tokio is in love with a human girl, Chibi-neko wishes to grow up quickly into a young woman. A tomcat, Raphael, tells Chibi-neko that it would be impossible for her to do so, shattering her dream. Raphael proceeds to tell Chibi-neko of a paradise called Cottonland, where dreams can come true. Chibi-neko runs away from home to travel with Raphael in search of Cottonland. After many adventures, she ends up near Tokio's house, where his mother finds her and overcomes her fear of cats.

== Characters ==
Chibi-neko (チビ猫, Chibi-neko)
Voiced by: Miina Tominaga
The main protagonist is a two-month-old kitten known as Chibi-neko Suwano (須和野 チビ猫, Suwano Chibineko). She was an abandoned cat before being adopted by Tokio. She believes that there is a way that cats can become human.
Tokio Suwano (須和野 時夫, Suwano Tokio)
Voiced by: Bin Shimada
18 years old. Has recently failed his college entrance exams after encountering a kitten.
Tobio Suwano (須和野 飛夫, Suwano Tobio)
Voiced by: Michio Hazama
Tokio's father and a novelist.
Fumiko Suwano (須和野 二三子, Suwano Fumiko)
Voiced by: Miyuki Ueda
Tokio's mother and a stay-at-home mom. She is allergic to cats and was afraid of them before she met Chibi.
Mitsuko (美津子, Mitsuko)
Voiced by: Keiko Han
Tokio's girlfriend and a law school student.
Raphael (ラフィエル, Rafieru)
Voiced by: Nachi Nozawa
Beautiful male leader of the neighborhood cats. He admires Chibi.
Buchineko Suzuki (鈴木ぶちねこ, Suzuki Buchi-neko)
Voiced by: Isao Nagahisa
Chibi-neko's friend. He has a little sister who looks like Chibi-neko.
Chestnut Man (くりまん, Kuriman)
Appears in the "Cat" Chibi sequel.

== Media ==
=== Manga ===
Wata no Kunihoshi was serialized by Hakusensha in LaLa magazine at irregular intervals from 1978 to 1987. The series was collected in seven tankōbon volumes under the Hana to Yume imprint, and then reissued in 16 child-sized volumes. It was later reprinted in four bunkoban volumes on June 17, 1994.

==== Original release ====
1. June 20, 1978, ISBN 4592112512
2. June 20, 1979, ISBN 4592112520
3. April 25, 1980, ISBN 4592112539
4. March 25, 1981, ISBN 4592112547
5. December 25, 1983, ISBN 4592112555
6. March 25, 1985, ISBN 4592112563
7. August 25, 1986, ISBN 4592112571

==== Reprint ====
The manga was reprinted in bunkoban format on June 17, 1994.

1. ISBN 4592880617
2. ISBN 4592880625
3. ISBN 4592880633
4. ISBN 4592880641

==== Film comics ====
The film was adapted by Futabasha in March 1984 into a three-part manga using images from the film.

1. 綿の国星Part 1
2. 綿の国星Part 2
3. 綿の国星Part 3

=== Other books ===
All books by Ōshima unless otherwise noted. Listed in release order.

- Hiru no Muya no Yume: Wata no Kunihoshi (昼の夢夜の夢―綿の国星) – Hardcover. Released by Hakusensha in May 1980. No ISBN.
- Wata no Kunihoshi (綿の国星) – Released by Hakusensha in December 1980. ISBN 4592760107. No ISBN.
- Wata no Kunihoshi Photo Concert (綿の国星フォトコンサート, Wata no Kunihoshi Foto Konsāto) – Mook related to the film. Released by Animedia through Gakken in March 1984. No ISBN.
- Richard Clayderman 8: Wata no Kunihoshi (リチャード・クレイダーマン 8 綿の国星, Richādo Kureidāman 8: Wata no Kunihoshi) – Sheet music book. Released by in January 1989. ISBN 3305041609.
- Chibineko (ちびねこ) – Picture book sequel to the manga. Released by Shogakukan in November 1995. ISBN 409727404X.
  - Reprint: Chibineko Picture Book (ちびねこ絵本, Chibineko Ehon) – Released in bunkoban and ebook formats by Hakusensha in November 2010. ISBN 9784592888505.
- Volumes 9, 15, and 16 of Yumiko Ōshima Selections (大島弓子選集, Ōshima Yumiko Senshū) – This 10-volume set contains selections from Ōshima's works. Volumes 9, 15, and 16 contain excerpts from this series. Released by Asahi Sonorama in August 2003. ISBN 4871187470.
- Wata no Kunihoshi Kēki no Hon (綿の国星ケーキの本) – Cookbook based on the manga, with many new illustrations and many from the manga. Co-written with Minako Imada, an expert on Western foods and table arrangements (for photos). Released by Fukkan in February 2014. ISBN 9784835450421.

=== Movie ===
Wata no Kunihoshi was adapted as an anime movie that was produced by Mushi Production. The movie was directed by Shinichi Tsuji from a script by Masaki Tsuji and Yumiko Ōshima, with music by pianist Richard Clayderman. The movie was released in theaters on February 11, 1984. The movie was later released on VHS, and VHD by Victor Japan. It was released on DVD by Columbia Music Entertainment on March 31, 2004.

=== Albums ===
The opening theme song for the film was by Richard Clayderman, titled "Theme of Wata no Kunihoshi" (綿の国星のテーマ, Wata no Kunihoshi no Tēma). The film featured an insert song, "とりはとりに" (鳥は鳥に), and an ending theme, "Blue Heart" (ブルーハート, Burū Hāto), both sung by Yūko Endō (遠藤優子, Endō Yūko). Two albums, a soundtrack and an image album, and a single were released.

- Wata no Kunihoshi Original Soundtrack (綿の国星オリジナル・サウンドトラック, Wata no Kunihoshi Orijinaru Saundotorakku) – Released as an LP by Victor Japan. VIP-20875.
- Wata no Kunihoshi Ongakuhen (綿の国星音楽編) – Released as an LP by Victor Japan. JBX-25030.
- Wata no Kunihoshi / Yumiko Ōshima I (綿の国星 / 大島弓子I, Wata no Kunihoshi / Ōshima Yumiko I) – Single EP (12-inch). Released by Victor in 1980. KVX-1073.

== Reception ==
Wata no Kunihoshi won the 3rd Kodansha Manga Award in the shōjo category in 1979. The same year, it was voted the most popular series running in LaLa magazine. According to German manga scholar Jaqueline Berndt, the depiction of cats as young girls spread to other manga series from Wata no Kunihoshi. It is described by Masanao Amano as not just a simple animal fable but a story in which psychological and mental states are highly differentiated.

The movie of Wata no Kunihoshi has been praised as a "hidden gem" for its complex characterization, philosophical story, and gorgeous animation. The soundtrack of Richard Clayderman's piano music is praised by Helen McCarthy and Jonathan Clements as striking exactly the right tone for the romantic mood. The depiction of Chibi-neko's self-image as a catgirl was seen by a reviewer at THEM Anime Reviews as a metaphor for adolescence.
