= Yasuhito Yamamoto =

Japanese manga artist

Yasuhito Yamamoto (Japanese: 山本康人, Hepburn: Yamamoto Yasuhito; born 1957) is a Japanese manga artist from Tokyo. He made his debut in 1980 in Young Jump with a gag-comedy manga before turning to more serious dramas. He won the 1994 Kodansha Manga Award for general manga for Tetsujin Ganma.
