= Fragile (manga) =

Japanese manga series

- First tankōbon volume cover, featuring Keiichirō Kishi

フラジャイル 病理医岸京一郎の所見 (Furajairu: Byōrii Kishi Keiichirō no Shoken)
- Genre: Medical drama
- Manga
- Written by: Bin Kusamizu
- Illustrated by: Saburō Megumi
- Published by: Kodansha
- Imprint: Afternoon KC
- Magazine: Monthly Afternoon
- Original run: June 25, 2014 – present
- Volumes: 32
- Television drama
- Directed by: Junichi Ishikawa
- Produced by: Hiroshi Kobayashi
- Written by: Atsuko Hashibe
- Music by: Yuki Hayashi; Asami Tachibana
- Original network: Fuji TV
- Original run: January 13, 2016 – March 16, 2016
- Episodes: 10
- icon

Fragile: Byōrii Kishi Keiichirō no Shoken (Japanese: フラジャイル 病理医岸京一郎の所見, Hepburn: Furajairu: Byōrii Kishi Keiichirō no Shoken; lit. 'Fragile: Observations of Pathologist Keiichirō Kishi') is a Japanese manga series written by Bin Kusamizu and illustrated by Saburō Megumi. It has been serialized in Kodansha's seinen manga magazine Monthly Afternoon since June 2014. A ten-episode Japanese television drama was broadcast on Fuji Television from January to March 2016.

In 2018, Fragile won the 42nd Kodansha Manga Award in the general category.

== Plot ==
Keiichirō Kishi is a talented pathologist with an eye for the clinical field and a vast amount of knowledge. However, he is also known as an eccentric and arrogant troublemaker. He secretly uses his diagnostic skills to save patients.

== Characters ==
Keiichirō Kishi (岸 京一郎, Kishi Keiichirō)
Portrayed by: Tomoya Nagase
Chihiro Miyazaki (宮崎 智尋, Miyazaki Chihiro)
Portrayed by: Emi Takei
Hisashi Morii (森井 久志, Morii Hisashi)
Portrayed by: Shūhei Nomura
Madoka Hosoki (細木 まどか, Hosoki Madoka)
Portrayed by: Koyuki
Kaoru Nakaguma (中熊 薫, Nakaguma Kaoru)
Portrayed by: Kin'ya Kitaōji
Naomi Hibako (火箱 直美, Hibako Naomi)
Portrayed by: Rena Matsui

== Media ==
=== Manga ===
Written by Bin Kusamizu and illustrated by Saburō Megumi, Fragile has been serialized in Kodansha's seinen manga magazine Monthly Afternoon since June 25, 2014. Kodansha has collected its chapters into individual tankōbon volumes. The first volume was released on November 21, 2014. As of September 18, 2026, 32 volumes have been released.

==== Volumes ====
| No. | Release date | ISBN |
|---|---|---|
| 1 | November 21, 2014 | 978-4-06-388015-1 |
| 2 | February 23, 2015 | 978-4-06-388035-9 |
| 3 | July 23, 2015 | 978-4-06-388066-3 |
| 4 | October 23, 2015 | 978-4-06-388095-3 |
| 5 | January 22, 2016 | 978-4-06-388114-1 |
| 6 | June 23, 2016 | 978-4-06-388144-8 |
| 7 | October 21, 2016 | 978-4-06-388192-9 |
| 8 | March 23, 2017 | 978-4-06-388243-8 |
| 9 | July 21, 2017 | 978-4-06-388278-0 |
| 10 | November 22, 2017 | 978-4-06-510364-7 |
| 11 | March 23, 2018 | 978-4-06-510780-5 |
| 12 | August 23, 2018 | 978-4-06-512322-5 |
| 13 | January 23, 2019 | 978-4-06-514211-0 |
| 14 | May 23, 2019 | 978-4-06-515484-7 |
| 15 | September 20, 2019 | 978-4-06-517248-3 |
| 16 | October 23, 2019 | 978-4-06-517876-8 |
| 17 | March 23, 2020 | 978-4-06-518888-0 |
| 18 | August 21, 2020 | 978-4-06-520540-2 |
| 19 | December 23, 2020 | 978-4-06-521728-3 |
| 20 | May 21, 2021 | 978-4-06-523311-5 |
| 21 | September 22, 2021 | 978-4-06-524818-8 |
| 22 | April 21, 2022 | 978-4-06-526860-5 |
| 23 | September 22, 2022 | 978-4-06-529190-0 |
| 24 | January 23, 2023 | 978-4-06-530268-2 |
| 25 | May 23, 2023 | 978-4-06-531686-3 |
| 26 | September 22, 2023 | 978-4-06-532980-1 |
| 27 | February 22, 2024 | 978-4-06-534607-5 |
| 28 | July 23, 2024 | 978-4-06-536072-9 |
| 29 | November 21, 2024 | 978-4-06-537465-8 |
| 30 | July 23, 2025 | 978-4-06-539147-1 |
| 31 | March 23, 2026 | 978-4-06-542859-7 |
| 32 | September 18, 2026 | 978-4-06-544188-6 |

=== Drama ===
The manga was adapted into a live-action television drama series starring Tomoya Nagase as Keiichirō Kishi and Emi Takei as Chihiro Miyazaki. It was directed by Junichi Ishikawa, scripted by Atsuko Hashibe, planning by Hiroaki Narukawa and produced by Hiroshi Kobayashi. The series ran for ten episodes on Fuji Television from January 13 to March 16, 2016.

== Reception ==
Alongside Sanju Mariko, Fragile won the 42nd Kodansha Manga Award in the general category in 2018. It was nominated for the 23rd Tezuka Osamu Cultural Prize in 2019. Fragile was one of the Jury Recommended Works at the 22nd Japan Media Arts Festival in 2019.
