= Kodansha Manga Award =

Japanese manga awards

- Awarded for: Manga
- Country: Japan
- First award: 1960; 1977 (current version)
- Website: Official website

The Kodansha Manga Award (Japanese: 講談社漫画賞, Hepburn: Kōdansha Manga Shō) is one of Japan's major manga awards. The event is sponsored by publisher Kodansha. It has been awarded annually for serialized manga in its third iteration since 1977.

== Categories ==
The award was originally called the Kodansha Children's Manga Award (講談社児童まんが賞, Kōdansha Jidō Manga Shō) until 1968. In 1970, it was named Kodansha Cultural Award: Children's manga category (講談社出版文化賞 児童まんが部門, Kōdansha Shuppan Bunka Shō: Jidō Manga Bumon). The second version lasted until 1976. The company decided to create multiple categories thereafter.

The award once was given out in four categories: shōnen, shōjo, children, and general. The award was formalized into the present ceremony with initially offering categories only for shōnen and shōjo in 1977. The first award for the general category was in 1982, and the first children's category award was in 2003. The children's category was merged into the shōnen and shōjo categories starting in 2015.

Each winning work will be honored with a certificate, a bronze statuette, and a monetary prize.

== Recipients ==
#	Year	Children	Shōnen (boys)	Shōjo (girls)	General	Ref.
1	1977	No specific award given	Black Jack by Osamu Tezuka; The Three-Eyed One by Osamu Tezuka (tie)	Haikara-san ga Tōru by Waki Yamato; Candy Candy by Kyoko Mizuki and Yumiko Igarashi (tie)	No specific award given	
2	1978	No specific award given	Football Hawk by Noboru Kawasaki	Seito Shokun! by Yōko Shōji	No specific award given	
3	1979	No specific award given	Tonda Couple by Kimio Yanagisawa	The Star of Cottonland by Yumiko Ōshima	No specific award given	
4	1980	No specific award given	Susano Oh by Gō Nagai	Lemon Report by Mayumi Yoshida	No specific award given	
5	1981	No specific award given	Sanshirō of 1, 2 by Makoto Kobayashi	Ohayō! Spank by Shun'ichi Yukimuro and Shizue Takanashi	No specific award given	
6	1982	No specific award given	Gakuto Retsuden by Motoka Murakami	Yōkihi-den by Suzue Miuchi	Karyūdo no Seiza by Machiko Satonaka	
7	1983	No specific award given	The Kabocha Wine by Mitsuru Miura	Hi Izuru Tokoro no Tenshi by Ryoko Yamagishi	P.S. Genki Desu, Shunpei by Fumi Saimon	
8	1984	No specific award given	Bats & Terry by Yasuichi Ōshima	Lady Love by Hiromu Ono	Akira by Katsuhiro Otomo	
9	1985	No specific award given	Bari Bari Densetsu by Shuichi Shigeno	Mahiro Taiken by Naomi Nishi	Okashina Futari by Jūzō Yamasaki and Kei Sadayasu	
10	1986	No specific award given	Kotaro Makaritoru by Tatsuya Hiruta	Yūkan Club by Yukari Ichijō	Adolf by Osamu Tezuka; What's Michael? by Makoto Kobayashi (tie)	
11	1987	No specific award given	Ironfist Chinmi by Takeshi Maekawa	Nana Iro Majikku by Yū Asagiri	Actor by Kaiji Kawaguchi	
12	1988	No specific award given	Mister Ajikko by Daisuke Terasawa	Junjō Crazy Fruits by Akemi Matsunae	Bonobono by Mikio Igarashi; Be-Bop High School by Kazuhiro Kiuchi (tie)	
13	1989	No specific award given	Meimon! Daisan Yakyūbu by Toshiyuki Mutsu	Chibi Maruko-chan by Momoko Sakura; Shiratori Reiko de Gozaimasu! by Yumiko Suzuki (tie)	Komikku Shōwa-Shi by Shigeru Mizuki	
14	1990	No specific award given	Shura no Mon by Masatoshi Kawahara	Pride, Naka Marimura	The Silent Service by Kaiji Kawaguchi; Gorillaman by Harold Sakuishi (tie)	
15	1991	No specific award given	Hajime no Ippo by George Morikawa	Eien no Nohara, Mieko Ōsaka	Kachō Kōsaku Shima by Kenshi Hirokane; Waru by Jun Fukami (tie)	
16	1992	No specific award given	Kaze Hikaru: Koshien, Sanbachi Kawa and Tarō Nami	Uchi no Mama ga iu Koto ni wa, Mariko Iwadate	Naniwa Kin'yūdō by Yūji Aoki	
17	1993	No specific award given	3×3 Eyes by Yuzo Takada	Sailor Moon by Naoko Takeuchi	Parasyte by Hitoshi Iwaaki	
18	1994	No specific award given	Aoki Densetsu Shoot! by Tsukasa Ōshima	Kimi no Te ga Sasayaite iru by Junko Karube	Tetsujin Ganma by Yasuhito Yamamoto	
19	1995	No specific award given	The Kindaichi Case Files by Yōsaburō Kanari and Fumiya Sato	Sekai de Ichiban Yasashii Ongaku by Mari Ozawa	Hanada Shōnen-shi by Makoto Isshiki	
20	1996	No specific award given	Shōta no Sushi by Daisuke Terasawa	Tennen Kokekkō by Fusako Kuramochi	The Ping Pong Club by Minoru Furuya	
21	1997	No specific award given	Ryūrōden by Yoshito Yamahara	Eight Clouds Rising by Natsumi Itsuki	Dragon Head by Minetaro Mochizuki	
22	1998	No specific award given	Great Teacher Onizuka by Tōru Fujisawa	Kodocha by Miho Obana	Gambling Apocalypse: Kaiji by Nobuyuki Fukumoto; Sōten Kōro by King Gonta (tie)	
23	1999	No specific award given	Chameleon by Atsushi Kase	Peach Girl by Miwa Ueda	Wangan Midnight by Michiharu Kusunoki	
24	2000	No specific award given	Legendary Gambler Tetsuya by Fūmei Sai and Yasushi Hoshino	Guru Guru Pon-chan by Satomi Ikezawa	Vagabond by Takehiko Inoue	
25	2001	No specific award given	Love Hina by Ken Akamatsu	Fruits Basket by Natsuki Takaya	20th Century Boys by Naoki Urasawa	
26	2002	No specific award given	Cromartie High School by Eiji Nonaka; Beck by Harold Sakuishi (tie)	Antique Bakery by Fumi Yoshinaga	Zipang by Kaiji Kawaguchi	
27	2003	Mirmo! by Hiromu Shinozuka	Kunimitsu no Matsuri by Yūma Andō and Masashi Asaki	Honey and Clover by Chika Umino; Tramps Like Us by Yayoi Ogawa (tie)	Tensai Yanagisawa Kyōju no Seikatsu by Kazumi Yamashita	
28	2004	Ultra Ninja Scrolls by Kazuhiko Midō	Shana ou Yoshitsune by Hirofumi Sawada	Nodame Cantabile by Tomoko Ninomiya	Basilisk: The Kouga Ninja Scrolls by Masaki Segawa	
29	2005	Sugar Sugar Rune by Moyoco Anno	Capeta by Masahito Soda	Oi Pītan!! by Risa Itō; A Perfect Day for Love Letters by George Asakura (tie)	Dragon Zakura by Norifusa Mita	
30	2006	Kitchen Princess by Miyuki Kobayashi and Natsumi Andō	Air Gear by Oh! Great	Life by Keiko Suenobu	Mushishi by Yuki Urushibara	
31	2007	Tenshi no Frypan by Etsushi Ogawa	Sayonara Zetsubō Sensei by Kōji Kumeta; Dear Boys Act II by Hiroki Yagami (tie)	I.S. by Chiyo Rokuhana	Big Windup! by Asa Higuchi	
32	2008	Shugo Chara! by Peach-Pit	Saikyō! Toritsu Aoizaka Kōkō Yakyūbu by Motoyuki Tanaka	Kimi ni Todoke by Karuho Shiina	Moyashimon by Masayuki Ishikawa	
33	2009	Meitantei Yumemizu Kiyoshirō Jiken Note by Kaoru Hayamine and Kei Enue	Q.E.D. by Motohiro Katou; Fairy Tail by Hiro Mashima (tie)	Kiyoku Yawaku by Ryo Ikuemi	Oh My Goddess! by Kōsuke Fujishima	
34	2010	Inazuma Eleven by Ten'ya Yabuno	Ace of Diamond by Yūji Terajima	Kuragehime by Akiko Higashimura	Giant Killing by Masaya Tsunamoto	
35	2011	Honto Ni Atta! Reibai Sensei by Hidekichi Matsumoto	Attack on Titan by Hajime Isayama	Chihayafuru by Yuki Suetsugu	March Comes In like a Lion by Chika Umino; Space Brothers by Chūya Koyama (tie)	
36	2012	Watashi ni xx Shinasai! by Ema Toyama	Those Snow White Notes by Marimo Ragawa	Shitsuren Chocolatier by Setona Mizushiro	Vinland Saga by Makoto Yukimura	
37	2013	Animal Land by Makoto Raiku	Your Lie in April by Naoshi Arakawa	My Love Story!! by Kazune Kawahara and Aruko	Gurazeni by Yūji Moritaka and Keiji Adachi; Prison School by Akira Hiramoto (tie)	
38	2014	Yo-kai Watch by Noriyuki Konishi	Baby Steps by Hikaru Katsuki	Taiyō no Ie by Ta'amo	Showa Genroku Rakugo Shinju by Haruko Kumota	
39	2015	No award given	The Seven Deadly Sins by Nakaba Suzuki; Yowamushi Pedal by Wataru Watanabe (tie)	Nigeru wa Haji da ga Yaku ni Tatsu by Tsunami Umino	Knights of Sidonia by Tsutomu Nihei	
40	2016	No award given	Days by Tsuyoshi Yasuda	Kiss Him, Not Me by Junko	Kōnodori by Yū Suzunoki	
41	2017	No award given	Altair: A Record of Battles by Kotono Katō	P and JK by Maki Miyoshi	The Fable by Katsuhisa Minami	
42	2018	No award given	Beastars by Paru Itagaki	Tōmei na Yurikago by Bakka Okita	Sanju Mariko by Yuki Ozawa; Fragile by Saburō Megumi and Bin Kusamizu (tie)	
43	2019	No award given	The Quintessential Quintuplets by Negi Haruba; To Your Eternity by Yoshitoki Ōima (tie)	Perfect World by Rie Aruga	What Did You Eat Yesterday? by Fumi Yoshinaga	
44	2020	No award given	Tokyo Revengers by Ken Wakui	Our Precious Conversations by Robico	Blue Period by Tsubasa Yamaguchi	
45	2021	No award given	Blue Lock by Muneyuki Kaneshiro and Yūsuke Nomura	A Condition Called Love by Megumi Morino	Yuria-sensei no Akai Ito by Kiwa Irie	
46	2022	No award given	That Time I Got Reincarnated as a Slime by Fuse and Taiki Kawakami	Nina the Starry Bride by Rikachi	Police in a Pod by Miko Yasu	
47	2023	No award given	Shangri-La Frontier by Katarina and Ryosuke Fuji	My Girlfriend's Child by Mamoru Aoi	Skip and Loafer by Misaki Takamatsu	
48	2024	No award given	Frieren: Beyond Journey's End by Kanehito Yamada and Tsukasa Abe	I See Your Face, Turned Away by Rumi Ichinohe	Medalist by Tsurumaikada	
49	2025	No award given	Versus by One, bose, and Kyōtarō Azuma	Fall in Love, You False Angels by Coco Uzuki	Historié by Hitoshi Iwaaki	
50	2026	No award given	Gachiakuta by Kei Urana	Re-Living My Life with a Boyfriend Who Doesn't Remember Me by Eiko Mutsuhana, Yugiri Aika, and Gin Shirakawa	The Darwin Incident by Shun Umezawa	

== See also ==
- List of manga awards
