= Kei Enue =

Japanese shōjo manga artist

- Occupation: Manga artist
- Writing career
- Genre: fiction
- Subject: Shōjo manga

Kei Enue (えぬえ けい, Enue Kei) is a female Japanese shōjo manga artist. Her work has been serialized in Kodansha's Nakayoshi magazine, except for her last manga which ran in KC Deluxe.

Her manga Channel W has been published in Spain by Planeta DeAgostini.

== List of works ==
Cover of the 3rd volume of B-Wanted

- RSR or R-S-Revolution: 1 volume
- B-Wanted (Bーウォンテッド): 6 volumes, 1999–2002
- Kami-sama ga Kureta Natsu: 1 volume, 2002
- Channel W: 1 volume, 2003
- Meitantei Yume Mizu Kiyoshirou Jiken Nooto (名探偵夢水清志郎事件ノート): 5 volumes, 2004 It won the 2009 Kodansha Manga Award for children's manga.
