= Yū Suzunoki =

Japanese singer-songwriter and manga artist

- 鈴ノ木ユウ
- Born: 鈴木祐樹; September 4, 1973 (age 53); Kōfu, Yamanashi, Japan
- Awards: Kodansha Manga Award (2016)
- Website: suzunokiyou.net

Yū Suzunoki (Japanese: 鈴ノ木ユウ, Hepburn: Suzunoki Yū; born September 4, 1973 in Kōfu, Yamanashi, Japan) is a Japanese manga artist and singer-songwriter. His real name is Yūki Suzunoki (鈴木祐樹, Suzunoki Yūki). He is married to singer Reina Hayashi—a member of Mimizuguzu—and lives in Nakano, Tokyo.

He won the 2016 Kodansha Manga Award for his manga Kounodori: Dr. Stork.

== Manga ==
- Ryōma ga Yuku (2022–present) (Originally written by Ryōtarō Shiba; serialized on Shūkan Bunshun)
