= Drunk as a Lord =

1965 novellas by Ryotaro Shiba

Drunk as a Lord (酔って候, Yotte Soro) is a collection of four novellas by Ryotaro Shiba, published in 1965. The English version was published by both the Japan Foundation and Kodansha International in June 2001. Eileen Kato translated the stories, and it was the second of Shiba's works to be translated into English.

== Content ==
All of the stories involve daimyō reacting to developments during the Tokugawa shogunate.

=== Drunk as a Lord ===
"Drunk as a Lord," the collection's namesake, is about a drinking and partying lord, Yamauchi Yodo, who tries to forge an alliance between the imperial court and the Tokugawa shogunate, but his efforts are in vain; he attempted this because he wanted to remain loyal to the Tokugawa even though he had taken an oath of loyalty to the Emperor and disagreed with open-door actions from the shogunate.

Yodo, described as an alcoholic in the story's end section, on page 103, also has an interest in literature, poetry, and debate, and proficiency in military affairs. The story places emphasis on his intellectual pursuits. Additionally he commits acts of torture against inmates who had committed political crimes. Shizuka Saeki of Look Japan describes Yodo as "a hard-drinking libertine who lives life on the wild side". Margaret Stawowy of The Japan Times characterized Yodo as "a double-talking, pompous tyrant" stated that "I was calling him an alcoholic and a bad word that also begins with “a” by page 12, and things only got worse." Stawowy argued that the narrative, by placing so much emphasis on the erudite characterization, does not prepare the Western reader for his more disagreeable traits, even though "having wisdom and a fine intellect does not exclude the potential for base conduct".

=== The Fox-Horse ===
The main character, Lord of Satsuma Shimazu Hisamitsu, inadvertently causes political change for Japan by executing a Briton who drove his horse in front of him, a personal offense. Hisamitsu had inherited his position after his brother, more skilled in politics than he, died of cholera. His advisors take control of him and orient him against the shogun; Stawowy stated that Hisamitsu is "a wannabe scholar" and a "prototypical clueless master manipulated by retainers who are superior to him in every way except rank."

=== Date's Black Ships ===
Repairman Kazo is down on his luck but particularly skillful with his hands. His talent leads him to be selected to reverse engineer and build a steamship for his Daimyō, Lord Date Munenari.

== Reception ==
Stawowy argued that the translation did not sufficiently introduce context nor clear cultural differences for western readers.
