= Kounodori: Dr. Stork =

Japanese manga series

- Cover of the first volume

コウノドリ (Kōnodori)
- Genre: Drama
- Manga
- Written by: Yū Suzunoki
- Published by: Kodansha
- English publisher: NA: Kodansha USA (digital)
- Magazine: Weekly Morning
- Original run: July 26, 2012 – May 7, 2020
- Volumes: 32
- Television drama

Dr. Storks
- Directed by: Nobuhiro Doi; Fuminori Kaneko
- Written by: Mutsumi Yamamoto
- Studio: TBS
- Original network: TBS
- Original run: October 16, 2015 – December 18, 2015
- Episodes: 10
- Television drama

Dr. Storks (2017 series)
- Original network: TBS
- Original run: October 13, 2017 – December 22, 2017
- Episodes: 11

Kounodori: Dr. Stork (コウノドリ, Kōnodori) is a Japanese manga series written and illustrated by Yū Suzunoki. It was published by Kodansha in Weekly Morning magazine from July 26, 2012, to May 7, 2020, and collected in 32 volumes. The manga won Best General Manga at the 40th Kodansha Manga Awards. Kodansha USA has licensed the manga for a North American digital release as Kounodori: Dr. Stork.

A TV drama adaptation, officially titled Dr. Storks (stylized as Dr.STOЯKS) in English, aired on the Tokyo Broadcasting System from October 16 to December 18, 2015. It was followed by a second series from October 13 to December 21, 2017.

== Characters ==
- Sakura Kōnotori (played by Go Ayano)
- Kae Shimoya (played by Mayu Matsuoka)
- Rumiko Komatsu (played by Yo Yoshida)
- Ryo Shirakawa (played by Kentaro Sakaguchi)
- Mayumi Kadota (played by Nana Seino)
- Hiroshi Kase (played by Yusuke Hirayama)
- Takuya Funakoshi (played by Akinaga Toyomoto)
- Director Osawa (played by Kazuyuki Asano)
- Sachiko Mukai (played by Noriko Eguchi)
- Megumi Arai (played by Sayaka Yamaguchi)
- Haruki Shinomiya (played by Gen Hoshino)
- Takayuki Imahashi (played by Nao Omori)
- Hiroyuki Nagai (played by Shun Oguri)
- Goro Akanishi (played by Hio Miyazawa)

== Volumes ==
- 1 (June 21, 2013)
- 2 (September 20, 2013)
- 3 (December 20, 2013)
- 4 (March 20, 2014)
- 5 (June 23, 2014)
- 6 (September 22, 2014)
- 7 (December 22, 2014)
- 8 (March 23, 2015)
- 9 (June 23, 2015)
- 10 (September 23, 2015)
- 11 (October 23, 2015)
- 12 (November 23, 2015)
- 13 (March 23, 2016)
- 14 (June 23, 2016)
- 15 (September 23, 2016)
- 16 (December 22, 2016)
- 17 (March 23, 2017)
- 18 (June 23, 2017)
- 19 (September 22, 2017)
- 20 (October 23, 2017)
- 21 (November 22, 2017)
- 22 (May 23, 2018)
- 23 (June 22, 2018)
- 24 (September 21, 2018)
- 25 (December 21, 2018)
- 26 (March 23, 2019)
- 27 (June 21, 2019)
- 28 (September 20, 2019)
- 29 (December 23, 2019)
- 30 (March 23, 2020)
- 31 (June 23, 2020)
- 32 (October 23, 2020)

== Reception ==
Volume 6 reached the 22nd place on the weekly Oricon manga charts and, as of September 28, 2014, had sold 43,198 copies; volume 7 reached the 31st place and, as of December 28, 2014, had sold 47,885 copies; volume 8 reached the 15th place and, as of March 29, 2015, had sold 48,477 copies.

The manga won Best General Manga at the 40th Kodansha Manga Awards. It was number 35 on the 15th Book of the Year list by Da Vinci magazine in 2014. It was also nominated for Best General Manga at the 39th Kodansha Manga Awards.
