= Ryōma ga Yuku =

Japanese manga series

- First tankōbon volume cover

竜馬がゆく
- Genre: Chanbara; Epic; Historical
- Manga
- Written by: Ryōtarō Shiba
- Illustrated by: Yū Suzunoki
- Published by: Bungeishunjū
- Magazine: Shūkan Bunshun
- Original run: April 28, 2022 – present
- Volumes: 15

Ryōma ga Yuku (Japanese: 竜馬がゆく) is a Japanese manga series adapted from the novel of the same name by Ryōtarō Shiba and illustrated by Yū Suzunoki. It has been serialized in Bungeishunjū's weekly magazine Shūkan Bunshun since April 2022, with its chapters collected in fifteen tankōbon volumes as of February 2026.

== Publication ==
Originally written by Ryōtarō Shiba based on his Ryōma ga Yuku novel, the manga illustrated by Yū Suzunoki, started in Bungeishunjū's weekly magazine Shūkan Bunshun on April 28, 2022. It was then transferred to the publisher's Bunshun Online website on April 11, 2023, and returned to its original magazine Shūkan Bunshun on September 21 of the same year. Bungeishunjū has collected its chapters into individual tankōbon volumes. The first volume was released on August 23, 2022. As of February 16, 2026, fifteen volumes have been released.

=== Volumes ===
No.	Release date	ISBN
1	August 23, 2022	978-4-16-090130-8
2	November 24, 2022	978-4-16-090140-7
3	February 21, 2023	978-4-16-090143-8
4	May 29, 2023	978-4-16-090145-2
5	August 24, 2023	978-4-16-090150-6
6	November 24, 2023	978-4-16-090154-4
7	February 20, 2024	978-4-16-090162-9
8	May 23, 2024	978-4-16-090171-1
9	August 22, 2024	978-4-16-090179-7
10	November 21, 2024	978-4-16-090190-2
11	February 20, 2025	978-4-16-090195-7
12	May 16, 2025	978-4-16-090201-5
13	August 18, 2025	978-4-16-090209-1
14	November 17, 2025	978-4-16-090218-3
15	February 16, 2026	978-4-16-090226-8
16	May 18, 2026	978-4-16-090237-4
