= Tatsuya Hiruta =

Japanese manga artist

Tatsuya Hiruta (蛭田達也, Hiruta Tatsuya, born 16 March 1961 in Iwaki, Fukushima, Japan) is a Japanese manga artist. He is best known for writing the long-running shōnen manga series Kōtarō Makaritōru! and its two sequels, Shin Kōtarō Makaritōru! and Kōtarō Makaritōru! L. In 1986, he won the Kodansha Manga Award for shōnen for Kōtarō Makaritōru!.
