= Lady Love (manga) =

Japanese manga series

- Cover of the first volume
- Manga
- Written by: Hiromu Ono
- Published by: Kodansha
- Magazine: Bessatsu Friend
- Original run: 1981 – 1984
- Volumes: 8

Lady Love is a Japanese manga series by Hiromu Ono. It won the Kodansha Manga Award for shōjo manga in 1984.

== Publication ==
Lady Love was serialized in the publisher Kodansha's magazine Bessatsu Friend between 1981 and 1984. Eight collected volumes were originally published by Kodansha between September 1981 and February 1985. An artbook was released on November 14, 1984. The series was republished twice; first into eight shinsōban between July 8, 1994, and August 19, 1994, and then into four bunkoban between March 10, 2000, and April 12, 2000. The series was published in the Corriere dei Piccoli in Italy.

The manga also spawned a sequel series titled Lady Love: Aisuru Anata e (愛するあなたへ; lit. 'Love to You') that was serialized in Be Love between 2005 and 2010. It was published in four volumes between September 13, 2006, and February 12, 2010.
