= Yuria's Red String of Fate =

Japanese manga series

- First tankōbon volume cover

ゆりあ先生の赤い糸 (Yuria-sensei no Akai Ito)
- Genre: Drama
- Manga
- Written by: Kiwa Irie
- Published by: Kodansha
- Imprint: Kodansha Comics BL
- Magazine: Be Love
- Original run: February 15, 2018 – September 1, 2022
- Volumes: 11
- Television drama
- Directed by: Kazunari Hoshino; Hiro Kanai; Hajime Takezono
- Produced by: Ayumi Mineshima (TV Asahi); Takuya Nakagome (TV Asahi); Ryosuke Yamagata (Kadokawa); Hiromi Arai (Kadokawa)
- Written by: Atsuko Hashibe
- Music by: Yugo Kanno
- Studio: TV Asahi
- Original network: ANN (TV Asahi)
- Original run: October 19, 2023 – December 14, 2023
- Episodes: 9
- icon

Yuria's Red String of Fate (Japanese: ゆりあ先生の赤い糸, Hepburn: Yuria-sensei no Akai Ito) is a Japanese manga series written and illustrated by Kiwa Irie. It was serialized in Kodansha's josei manga magazine Be Love from February 2018 to September 2022, with its chapters collected in eleven tankōbon volumes. A nine-episode television drama adaptation aired on TV Asahi from October to December 2023.

The manga won the 45th Kodansha Manga Award for the general category in 2021, and the 27th Tezuka Osamu Cultural Prize in 2023.

== Plot ==
Yuria Izawa (伊沢 ゆりあ, Izawa Yuria) lives a simple but happy life teaching embroidery. She is married to Gorō Izawa (伊沢 吾良, Izawa Gorō), a kind but unsuccessful novelist. One day, her husband is hospitalized after a sudden collapse. At the hospital, Yuria meets a young man named Riku Yanai (箭内 稟久, Yanai Riku) who declares himself to be Gorō's lover. They are soon joined by Michiru Oyamada (小山田 みちる, Oyamada Michiru), a married woman with whom Gorō had a long-standing intimate relationship, and her two daughters, who consider Gorō their father. Yuria proposes they all move into her home to care for him collectively. She maintains her composure throughout this highly unconventional arrangement. Over time, Yuria begins to sense the possibility of a new romance, a development she had not foreseen.

== Media ==
=== Manga ===
Written and illustrated by Kiwa Irie, Yuria's Red String of Fate was serialized in Kodansha's josei manga magazine Be Love from February 15, 2018, to September 1, 2022. Kodansha collected its chapters in 11 tankōbon volumes, released from July 13, 2018. to September 13, 2022.

==== Volumes ====
No.	Release date	ISBN
1	July 13, 2018	978-4-06-512248-8
2	October 12, 2018	978-4-06-513597-6
3	March 13, 2019	978-4-06-514898-3
4	September 13, 2019	978-4-06-516848-6
5	January 10, 2020	978-4-06-518409-7
6	June 11, 2020	978-4-06-519763-9
7	November 13, 2020	978-4-06-521399-5
8	April 13, 2021	978-4-06-522960-6
9	September 13, 2021	978-4-06-524770-9
10	March 11, 2022	978-4-06-527039-4
11	September 13, 2022	978-4-06-529054-5

=== Drama ===
In June 2023, a television drama adaptation was announced, starring Miho Kanno. It aired on TV Asahi from October 19 to December 14 of the same year.

== Reception ==
On Takarajimasha's Kono Manga ga Sugoi! list of best manga of 2019 for female readers, the series ranked 16th (alongside Dokushin OL no Subete and Lullaby for Girl); it ranked eighth (alongside Hadaka Ikkan! Tsuzui-san) on the 2020 list; and 11th on the 2022 list. The manga won the 45th Kodansha Manga Award for the general category in 2021. It won the 27th Tezuka Osamu Cultural Prize in 2023.
