= Shōjo Friend =

Japanese manga magazine

- January 1, 1971 issue of Shōjo Friend
- Categories: Shōjo manga
- Frequency: Weekly (1962–1974); Semimonthly (1974–1991); Monthly (1991–1996)
- Founded: 1962
- Final issue: September 1996
- Company: Kodansha
- Country: Japan
- Based in: Tokyo
- Language: Japanese

Shōjo Friend (Japanese: 少女フレンド, Hepburn: Shōjo Furendo) was a shōjo manga magazine formerly published by Kodansha, beginning in 1962. Kodansha used the knowledge gained from publishing magazines aimed at young girls, including Nakayoshi and Shōjo Club, as well as the experience from publishing Weekly Shonen Magazine. Shōjo Friend is considered the successor to Shōjo Club. In 1963, Shueisha began publishing Margaret, and the two magazines became fierce competitors. Shogakukan entered the market competition in 1968 with Shōjo Comic.

During this time, popular series such as Haikara-san ga Tōru (by Waki Yamato) and Seito Shokun! (by Yōko Shōji) were published in Shōjo Friend. Despite the popularity of these series, the circulation began to decline and the magazine dropped from weekly to bi-monthly publication, and then finally to monthly publication.

The final issue was released in September 1996, an event which surprised many people as Shōjo Friend had been ranked third, following Nakayoshi and Ribon. The cessation of publication was reported widely in the TV news as well. The remaining content which was supposed to have been published in Shōjo Friend such as Suspense & Horror was absorbed in Dessert and The Dessert as special inserts through 1999.

== Manga serializations ==
August 1974 issue, featuring art by Ado Mizumori

=== Tetsuya Chiba ===
- Yuki no Taiyou (1962)
- Misokkasu (1966)
- Akane-chan (1967)

=== Waki Yamato ===
- Mon Cherie Coco (1971)
- Hitoribocchi Ruca (1974)
- Love Pack (1974)
- Haikara-san ga Tōru (1975)
- Lady Mitsuko (1976)
- Kigen 2600 Nen no Playball (1979)
- Aiiro Shinwa (1980)
- Yokohama Monogatari (1980)
- Tsubasa Aru Mono (1980)
- N.Y. Komachi (1986)
- Bodaiju (1984)

=== Osamu Tezuka ===
- Princess Knight (1967 version)

=== Fujio Akatsuka ===
- Jajako-Chan (1965–1967)

=== Kazuo Umezu ===
- Hebi Shoujo (1965)
- Hangyojin (1965)
- Kagehime (1966)
- Akumu (1966)
- Kuroi Nekomen (1966)
- Akanbo Shōjo (1967)

=== Moto Hagio ===
- Bianca (1969)

=== Yōko Shōji ===
- Seito Shokun!
- Darling Kishidan (1985)

=== Ritsuko Abe ===
- Dekkai Chanto Atsumare (1971)
- Suekko Taifuu (1972)
- Mama no Ojisama (1972)
- Teki wa Tsuyoi Zo Tegowai Zo! (1974)
- Nonnon Plus 3 (1976)

=== Yu Asagiri ===
- Onnanoko no Fushigi (1990)
- Kurenai Densetsu (1991)
- Onnanoko no Honki (1991)

=== Machiko Satonaka ===
- Pia no Shouzou (1964)
- Nana to Lili (1967)
- Ashita Kagayaku (1972)
- Aries no Otome-tachi (1973)
- Cleopatra (1975)
- Umi no Aurora (1977)
- Pia no Shouzou (1984)

=== Miyuki Yorita ===
- Kokuhaku wo Request (1995)
- Kabocha no Caramel

=== Hiromi Washiba ===
- Kimi ga Waratta

=== Chikako Kikukawa ===
- Mienai Sakebi (1986)

== See also ==
- List of manga magazines
