= Kiko-chan's Smile =

Japanese manga series

- First wideban volume cover

きこちゃんすまいる (Kiko-chan Sumairu)
- Genre: Comedy
- Manga
- Written by: Tsubasa Nunōra
- Published by: Kodansha
- Magazine: Be Love Pair; Be Love Parfait
- Original run: 1991 – 2001
- Volumes: 2 (wideban); 5 (tankōbon)
- Anime television series
- Directed by: Setsuko Shibuichi
- Produced by: Hidenori Murata; Tatsuo Ono; Tetsu Dezaki
- Written by: Kazumi Koide; Mitsuyo Suenaga
- Music by: Kōtarō Nakagawa
- Studio: Eiken (production); Magic Bus (animation)
- Original network: JNN (TBS)
- Original run: October 5, 1996 – September 27, 1997
- Episodes: 51
- icon

Kiko-chan's Smile (Japanese: きこちゃんすまいる, Hepburn: Kiko-chan Sumairu) is a Japanese manga series written and illustrated by Tsubasa Nunōra. It was serialized in Kodansha's josei manga magazine Be Love Pair, and later Be Love Parfait, from 1991 to 2001, with its chapters collected in five tankōbon volumes; the publisher first collected its chapters in two wideban volumes. The series follows Kiko Ninomiya, a kindergarten student who has many features of a child prodigy, but at the same time displays bizarre habits and an odd personality.

A 51-episode (totalling 126 segments) anime television series, produced by Eiken and animated by Magic Bus, was broadcast on TBS from 1996 to 1997.

== Characters ==
Kiko Shinomiya (篠宮 きこ, Shinomiya Kiko)
Voiced by: Satsuki Yukino
Kiko is a four-year-old (five in the end of the series) girl who attends a private kindergarten in Tokyo. She is capable of doing many things most four-year-olds are not capable of; these include cooking, unassisted grocery shopping, limited acrobatics. Despite the title of the series, it is very rare to actually see Kiko smile and almost as rare for her to speak. Despite this, Kiko is quite popular with her classmates. She also has a wide variety of interests, including ballet, learning English, playing video games and interfering with her teacher's love life.
Makiko Shinomiya (篠宮 まきこ, Shinomiya Makiko) and Tarō Shinomiya (篠宮 たろう, Shinomiya Tarō)
Voiced by: Yumi Takada (Makiko) and Voiced by: Mitsuru Miyamoto (Tarō)
Kiko's parents. Papa is a salaryman, Mama is a housewife, and both find their daughter a source of much puzzlement and frustration. Still they are devoted parents.
Miss Megumi (めぐみ先生, Megumi-sensei)
Voiced by: Yuko Mizutani
Kiko's kindergarten teacher. She is twenty years old, and this is her first job out of teaching college. Kiko's eccentricities nearly make it her last, but Kiko is fond of her and turns her happiness into a personal project. Kiko also interferes with her love life, and helped her to find a boyfriend whom she married in the last episode. She hates carrots, to the point of fainting when she sees one. But carrots are her boyfriend's family's favorite food, so she often had to ask Kiko for help on the dates. She is extremely careless, even losing her wedding ring.
Honto wa Tenshi (ほんとは天使; "A Real Angel")
Voiced by: Kousuke Okano
An angel who has come to Earth in the form of a black cat on a mission to spread happiness throughout the world. He is unable to communicate with humans (who hear his speech as cat noises), and Kiko adopts him. Even more problematically, he falls hopelessly in love with a vain female cat named Rosa, who eventually reciprocates his affection long enough to bear a litter of five kittens, who she leaves to his (and, without her knowledge, Kiko's) care. His nickname is Neko-chan.
Honto wa Akuma (ほんとは悪魔; "A Real Devil")
Voiced by: Hideyuki Umezu
A devil who is the Tenshi's rival and has come to Earth in the form of a Siamese cat on a mission to spread chaos throughout the world. He carries a ball on his collar that causes bad things to happen. Unlike his rival, he was never adopted.

== Media ==
=== Manga ===
Written and illustrated by Tsubasa Nunōra, Kiko-chan's Smile was serialized in Kodansha's josei manga magazine Be Love Pair, and later Be Love Parfait, from 1991 to 2001. Kodansha first collected its chapters in two wideban volumes, released on October 5, 1993, and March 7, 1995; it later collected its chapters in five tankōbon volumes, released from February 9, 1996, to February 9, 2001.

=== Anime ===
A 51-episode (totalling 126 segments) anime television series, produced by Eiken and animated by Magic Bus, was broadcast on TBS from October 5, 1996, to September 27, 1997.
