= Waru (manga) =

Japanese manga series

- Cover of the first volume

悪女 (Waru)
- Manga
- Written by: Jun Fukami
- Published by: Kodansha
- Magazine: Be Love
- Original run: 1988 – 1997
- Volumes: 37
- Television drama
- Written by: Yumiko Kamiyama
- Studio: Yomiuri Telecasting Corporation; Kitty Films
- Original network: NNS (YTV)
- Original run: April 18, 1992 – June 27, 1992
- Episodes: 11

Waru (Japanese: 悪女; lit. "Bad Woman") is a Japanese manga written and illustrated by Jun Fukami.

The manga was published in Kodansha's semimonthly josei manga magazine Be Love from 1988 to 1997. In 1991 manga has win 15th Kodansha Manga Award in general category. Manga was collected in thirty-seven tankōbon volumes. The first volume was released on July 13, 1989 and last on July 11, 1997.

In 1992, manga was adapted into television drama.

== Characters ==
Maririn Tanaka (田中 麻理鈴, Tanaka Maririn)

Osamu Tamura (田村 収, Tamura Osamu)

== Media ==
=== Manga ===
The manga was published in Kodansha's semimonthly manga magazine Be Love from 1988 to 1997. In 1991 manga has win 15th Kodansha Manga Award in general category. Manga consisting 222 chapters was collected and published in thirty-seven tankōbon volumes. The first volume was released on July 13, 1989 and last on July 11, 1997.

The manga sold 7.1 million copies in Japan.
