= Seito Shokun! =

Japanese manga series

- Cover of the first tankōbon volume, featuring Naoko Kitashirou

生徒諸君!
- Manga
- Written by: Yōko Shōji
- Published by: Kodansha
- Magazine: Shōjo Friend
- Original run: April 6, 1977 – January 30, 1984
- Volumes: 24
Further information
Television drama
Directed by	Kimio Hirayama; Takahashi Masaharu
Written by	Masaki Tsuji; Ryō Nakahara
Studio	TV Asahi; Toei Company
Original network	ANN (TV Asahi)
Original run	September 1, 1980 – March 30, 1981
Episodes	28
Anime television film
Seito Shokun! Kokoro ni Midori no Neckerchief wo
Directed by	Mitsuo Kusakabe
Produced by	Masamichi Fujiwara; Hiroshi Kato; Akifumi Takuma
Written by	Ryo Ishikawa; Azuma Tachibana
Music by	Toshiyuki Watanabe
Studio	Toho; Ashi Productions
Original network	Fuji TV
Released	February 23, 1986
Runtime	65 minutes
Live-action video
Directed by	Makoto Naito
Written by	Ryo Ishikawa
Studio	Hori Productions
Released	June 8, 1987
Runtime	85 minutes
Manga
Seito Shokun! Kyōshi-hen
Written by	Yōko Shōji
Published by	Kodansha
Magazine	Be Love
Original run	2003 – March 1, 2011
Volumes	25
Television drama
Directed by	Marehiro Karaki; Naoki Tamura
Written by	Mutsuki Watanabe
Studio	Horipro
Original network	TV Asahi
Original run	April 20, 2007 – June 22, 2007
Episodes	10
Manga
Seito Shokun! Saishū-shō: Tabidachi
Written by	Yōko Shōji
Published by	Kodansha
Magazine	Be Love
Original run	April 1, 2011 – March 1, 2019
Volumes	30

Seito Shokun! (Japanese: 生徒諸君!; lit. 'Attention Students!') is a Japanese manga written and illustrated by Yōko Shōji. It is serialized in Kodansha's Shōjo Friend from 1977 to 1984. The individual chapters were published into 24 tankōbon by Kodansha between February 1978 and June 1985. Seito Shokun! won the second Kodansha Manga Award in 1978 for the shōjo category.

The sequel to the manga, Seito Shokun! Kyōshi-hen was serialized in Kodansha's Be Love between 2003 and 2011. Another spin-off, Seito Shokun! Saishū-shō: Tabidachi, was published between 2011 and 2019 in the same magazine. The manga was adapted into several live action dramas, with two television drama series, from 1980 to 1981 and in 2007. It was also adapted into a live action film and two live action television specials, broadcast on Fuji TV on February 23, 1986, and June 8, 1987, respectively.

== Releases ==
=== Manga ===
Seito Shokun! is a manga written and illustrated by Yōko Shōji. It is serialized in Kodansha's Shōjo Friend from 1977 to 1984. Kodansha released the manga's 24 tankōbon between February 1978 and June 1985. In September, 1983, Kodansha released a one-shot spin-off of Seito Shokun!, called Seito Shokun! Gaiden (生徒諸君!外伝). Kodansha re-released the manga in 12 kanzenban volumes, which were released between December 12, 1995, and March 12, 1996.

Kodansha released a sequel of the manga, called Seito Shokun! Kyōshi-hen (生徒諸君!教師編). It was serialized in Kodansha's josei manga magazine, Be Love. Its first tankōbon volume was published on April 13, 2004, and its 25th and last was published on August 11, 2011.

Another spin-off, Seito Shokun! Saishū-shō: Tabidachi (生徒諸君! 最終章・旅立ち), was published between August 2011 and April 2019 issues of Be Love. Its first tankōbon was published on August 11, 2011, and the 30th and last on April 12, 2019.

=== Live action film ===
The manga was adapted in a film released on December 22, 1984, directed by Katsumi Nishikawa, produced by Kadokawa Pictues with the script written by Katsuto Kawabe and Seiko Mafune, starring Kyoko Koizumi (in the lead role as Naoko Kitashirou), Kyoko Kishida, Kenji Haga, Yosuke Natsuki, Ichiro Arishima and Katsunobu Ito. The film's theme music The Stardust Memory (スターダスト・メモリー) was written by Ken Takahashi, composed by Toshihiko Takamizawa, arranged by Akira Inoue and performed by Kyoko Koizumi herself.

=== Live action dramas ===
The manga was adapted into a 28-episode live action series, which was broadcast on TV Asahi between September 1, 1980, and March 30, 1981. Produced by Toei, the drama was directed by Kimio Hirayama and Takahashi Masaharu, with the script written by Masaki Tsuji and Ryō Nakahara and Takeyuki Suzuki and Yoshiaki Koizumi as producers. The series' theme musics, "Hai! Seito Shokun" (ハーイ!生徒諸君!), with lyrics by Kayoko Fujimori and "Akutare Dane" (悪たれ団へ), with lyrics by Yōko Shōji, were both composed by Asei Kobayashi, arranged by Masahisa Takeichi and performed by Satoko Yamano. It starred Mie Ueda.

A live action television special, produced by Production Reed, was broadcast on Fuji TV on February 23, 1986. Directed by Mitsuo Kusakabe, it starred Tomoyo Harada, Sumi Shimamoto and Michie Tomizawa.

Another live-action television special, produced by Hori Productions, was broadcast on Fuji TV on June 8, 1987. It was directed by Makoto Naito, produced by Masayuki Morikawa, Nobuyuki Kurauchi and Akifumi Takuma, with the script written by Ryo Ishikawa. The ending theme song, "Toki no Kawa o Koete" (時の河を越えて, lit. Beyond the River of Time), composed by Tsugutoshi Gotō with lyrics written by Yasushi Akimoto, was performed by Ushirogami Hikaretai. It starred Miki Itō, Shigeyuki Nakamura and Nagare Harigawa.

In 2007, Horipro produced a 10-episode live-action television series. Directed by Karaki Marehiro and Tamura Naoki, the drama's 10 episodes was broadcast on TV Asahi between April 20, 2007, and June 22, 2007. The series' ending theme, "My Generation" was performed by Yui, who released a CD containing the theme song on June 13, 2007. The soundtrack for the series was released by Nippon Columbia as a soundtrack CD on June 20, 2007. The DVD box set for the series was released by Asahi Broadcasting Corporation on September 26, 2007. It starred Rina Uchiyama, Kippei Shiina, Maki Horikita and Kanata Hongō.

== Reception ==
Seito Shokun! won the second Kodansha Manga Award in 1978 for the shōjo category.

The fourteenth volume of Seito Shokun! Kyoshi-hen was ranked 10th on the Tohan charts between March 11 and 17, 2008. The sixteenth volume of Seito Shokun! Kyoshi-hen was ranked 10th on the Tohan charts between November 11 and 17, 2008. The seventeenth volume of Seito Shokun! Kyoshi-hen was ranked 26th on the Tohan charts between February 10 and 16, 2009. As of 2010, Seito Shokun! and Seito Shokun! Kyoshi-hen have sold over 25 million copies in Japan.
