= Tōmei na Yurikago =

Japanese manga series

- Tōmei na Yurikago: Sanfujinkain Kangoshi Minarai Nikki
- First tankōbon volume cover

透明なゆりかご 産婦人科院 看護師見習い日記
- Genre: Medical
- Manga
- Written by: Bakka Okita
- Published by: Kodansha
- Imprint: Kodansha Comics Kiss
- Magazine: Kiss Plus (2013–2014); Hatsu Kiss (2014–2021)
- Original run: December 7, 2013 – February 25, 2021
- Volumes: 9
- Television drama
- Directed by: Takeshi Shibata; Naoki Murahashi; Haruka Kashima
- Written by: Naoko Adachi
- Music by: Yasuaki Shimizu
- Original network: NHK
- Original run: July 20, 2018 – September 21, 2018
- Episodes: 10
- icon

Tōmei na Yurikago: Sanfujinkain Kangoshi Minarai Nikki (透明なゆりかご 産婦人科院 看護師見習い日記; 'The Invisible Cradle: Diary of a Nurse Apprentice of an Obstetrics and Gynecology Clinic') is a Japanese manga series written and illustrated by Bakka Okita. It was first serialized in Kodansha's josei manga magazines Kiss Plus (December 2013 to February 2014) and Hatsu Kiss (June 2014 to February 2021), with its chapters collected in seven tankōbon volumes. The series was adapted into a ten-episode television drama broadcast on NHK from July to September 2018.

In 2018, Tōmei na Yurikago won the 42nd Kodansha Manga Award in the shōjo category.

== Media ==
=== Manga ===
Written and illustrated by Bakka Okita, based on her own experience working at an obstetrics and gynaecology clinic, Tōmei na Yurikago started in Kodansha's josei manga magazine Kiss Plus on December 7, 2013. The magazine ceased its publication on February 8, 2014, and the series was transferred to the brand new magazine Hatsu Kiss on June 13 of the same year; the magazine switched to digital-only publication on June 25, 2018. The series finished on February 25, 2021. Kodansha collected its chapters in nine tankōbon volumes released from May 13, 2015, to April 13, 2021.

==== Volumes ====
No.	Japanese release date	Japanese ISBN
1	May 13, 2015	978-4-06-340957-4
2	October 13, 2015	978-4-06-340969-7
3	April 13, 2016	978-4-06-340985-7
4	October 13, 2016	978-4-06-398001-1
5	May 12, 2017	978-4-06-340957-4
6	December 13, 2017	978-4-06-510617-4
7	August 9, 2018	978-4-06-512877-0
8	October 11, 2019	978-4-06-514482-4
9	April 13, 2021	978-4-06-518734-0

=== Drama ===
A ten-episode television drama adaptation was broadcast on NHK from July 20 to September 21, 2018.

== Reception ==
On Takarajimasha's Kono Manga ga Sugoi! list of best manga of 2019 for female readers, the series ranked 6th. The series ranked 11th on the "Nationwide Bookstore Employees' Recommended Comics of 2017" poll by Honya Club online bookstore. In 2018, the series won the 42nd Kodansha Manga Award in the shōjo category.
