= Shura no Mon (1998 video game) =

- Developer: Kodansha
- Publisher: Kodansha
- Platform: PlayStation
- Release: JP: April 2, 1998
- Genre: Versus fighting game
- Mode: Up to 2 players simultaneously

Shura no Mon (修羅の門, Shura's Gate) is a Japanese 1998 fighting video game for the PlayStation, developed and published by Kodansha based on the 1987 manga of the same name.

== Reception ==
Shura no Mon was panned by Japanese gaming magazine Famitsu, which rated it 12 out of 40 (3/3/4/2) and called it a kusoge. Famitsu criticized the game for its simplicity, unnatural action, bad music and graphics, and long loading times, ultimately questioning whether the game was really finished. Reviewer Ranbu Yoshida gave the unprecedented score of 2, and Shura no Mon became the first console game to receive such a low overall score.
