= Kiss Him, Not Me =

Japanese manga series

- Cover of the first volume

私がモテてどうすんだ (Watashi ga Motete Dousunda)
- Genre: Reverse harem; Romantic comedy
- Manga
- Written by: Junko
- Published by: Kodansha
- English publisher: NA: Crunchyroll Manga (online); Kodansha USA (print)
- Imprint: Kodansha Comics
- Magazine: Bessatsu Friend
- Original run: April 13, 2013 – February 13, 2018
- Volumes: 14
- Audio drama
- Original run: January 13, 2015 – present
- Anime television series
- Directed by: Hiroshi Ishiodori
- Written by: Michiko Yokote
- Music by: Ruka Kawada
- Studio: Brain's Base
- Licensed by: NA: Crunchyroll; UK: Anime Limited
- Original network: TBS, CBC, Sun TV, BS-TBS, TBS Channel 1
- Original run: October 6, 2016 – December 22, 2016
- Episodes: 12
- Live-action film
- Directed by: Norihisa Hiranuma
- Written by: Norihisa Hiranuma; Nami Kikkawa; Shōhei Fukuda; Kei Watanabe; Daisuke Kamijō
- Studio: Shochiku
- Released: July 10, 2020
- Runtime: 90 mins
- icon

Kiss Him, Not Me (Note: English subname of the original Japanese manga version is "Boys, Please Kiss Him Instead of Me") (Japanese: 私がモテてどうすんだ, Hepburn: Watashi ga Motete Dōsunda; lit. "What's the Point of Me Getting Popular?") is a Japanese romantic comedy manga series written and illustrated by Junko. The manga centers around Kae Serinuma, a fujoshi who, after the death of her favorite anime character, loses a large amount of weight, gaining the attraction of four of her classmates, much to her chagrin.

Kiss Him, Not Me was serialized in Kodansha's Bessatsu Friend magazine from April 2013 to February 2018. Fourteen tankōbon have been released. It is published in English by Crunchyroll for online releases and by Kodansha USA in print. The manga won Best Shōjo Manga at the 40th Kodansha Manga Awards. An audio drama adaptation of the first chapter was released in January 2015. An anime adaptation by Brain's Base aired in Japan between October and December 2016. A live-action film adaptation was released in July 2020.

== Plot ==
Kae Serinuma is a fujoshi, a female otaku who loves reading yaoi and imagining men together in romantic relationships, both fictional and real. When one of her favorite anime characters is killed off, Kae is so shocked that she locks herself in her room for a whole week. When she eventually comes out, she discovers that she has lost a lot of weight, making her a beautiful girl that catches the eye of four boys at her school: Yūsuke Igarashi, Nozomu Nanashima, Hayato Shinomiya, and Asuma Mutsumi. Despite learning about Kae's bizarre tendencies, the four boys, along with another fujoshi named Shima Nishina, all fall for Kae and begin competing with each other for her affection, much to Kae's frustration as she wants them to fall in love with each other.

== Characters ==
=== Main characters ===
Kae Serinuma (芹沼 花依, Serinuma Kae)
Voiced by: Kana Hanazawa (drama CD), Yū Kobayashi (Japanese); Jeannie Tirado (English)
Played by: Miu Tomita (pre-weight loss form), Nonoka Yamaguchi (weight loss form) (live-action film)
Kae is a fujoshi in her second year of high school and part of the history club, who becomes excited over the sight of two boys together. Initially overweight, Kae loses weight after a week of mourning over the death of her favorite anime character, becoming more slender and attractive as a result. Despite becoming the object of affection for several boys as a result, she still thoroughly enjoys her otaku hobbies and is unsure how to deal with the attention she gets from the boys.
Yūsuke Igarashi (五十嵐 祐輔, Igarashi Yūsuke)
Voiced by: Yoshimasa Hosoya (drama CD), Yūki Ono (Japanese); Alejandro Saab (English)
Played by: Fūju Kamio (live-action film)
Igarashi is one of Kae's classmates, who is part of the soccer club. He is characterized as "the boy next door" type. After spending more time with Kae, he gets to know her more as a person and falls in love with who she is.
Nozomu Nanashima (七島 希, Nanashima Nozomu)
Voiced by: Tatsuhisa Suzuki (drama CD), Keisuke Kōmoto (Japanese); Orion Pitts (English)
Played by: Asahi Ito (live-action film)
Nozomu is one of Kae's classmates, who is categorized as a "bad boy" type and resembles Shion, her favorite character from Mirage Saga. He used to be a soccer player when he was much younger, but lost confidence following an incident with Yūsuke. Although he portrays a tough exterior, he is actually quite soft-hearted and very kind when he wants to be. He has a younger sister and is good at housekeeping.
Hayato Shinomiya (四ノ宮 隼人, Shinomiya Hayato)
Voiced by: Hiroshi Kamiya (drama CD), Yoshitsugu Matsuoka (Japanese); Justin Briner (English)
Played by: So Okuno (live-action film)
He is a first year student and member of the health committee, who started having a crush on Kae after she lost weight. He has an effeminate appearance, prone to blushing and getting flustered, and is often characterized as a tsundere by the other boys. He owns a female iguana named Thor, whom he cares for dearly.
Asuma Mutsumi (六見 遊馬, Mutsumi Asuma)
Voiced by: Takahiro Sakurai (drama CD), Nobunaga Shimazaki (Japanese); David Wald (English)
Played by: Hokuto Yoshino (live-action film)
A third year student who is president of the history club and one of the few people who liked Kae before she lost her weight, but doesn't realize it until later on in the series. While more laid back and less competitive than the other boys, he can become aggressive when someone picks on Kae. He's very open minded and doesn't seem to notice nor mind any of Kae's otaku eccentricities.
Shima Nishina (二科 志麻, Nishina Shima)
Voiced by: Chinatsu Akasaki (drama CD), Miyuki Sawashiro (Japanese); Michelle Rojas (English)
Played by: Satsuki Nakayama (live-action film)
An androgynous first year girl who is the descendant of a rich family and is skilled in both sports and arts. According to the boys, she is "Takarazuka-like prince type". Like Kae, she is also a fujoshi and even runs her own dōjin circle. Having had trouble being respected for her art due to her family's status, Shima came to admire Kae from even before her transformation after she complimented her work thus receiving the motivation to pursue drawing.

=== Secondary characters ===
Amane Nakano (中野あまね, Nakano Amane)
Voiced by: Asami Shimoda (Japanese); Whitney Rodgers (English)
Played by: Miku Uehara (live-action film)
Kae's best friend and classmate and a fellow otaku and fujoshi. She has a boyfriend who is unaware of her hobbies.
Takurō Serinuma (芹沼 拓郎, Serinuma Takurō)
Voiced by: Nobuhiko Okamoto (drama CD), Takahiro Mizushima (Japanese); Cris George (English)
Played by: Shuto Miyazaki (live-action film)
Kae's older brother.
Kazuma Mutsumi (六見 一馬, Mutsumi Kazuma)
Voiced by: Junichi Suwabe (drama CD), Yūichi Nakamura (Japanese); Ricco Fajardo (English)
Asuma's older brother.
Mitsuko Serinuma (芹沼 みつこ, Serinuma Mitsuko)
Voiced by: Yū Sugimoto (Japanese); Jessica Cavanagh (English)
Played by: Naho Toda (live-action film)
Kae's mother.
Hideo Serinuma (芹沼 英男, Serinuma Hideo)
Kae's father, who is very protective of her.
Takeru Mitsuboshi (三星 建, Mitsuboshi Takeru)
Kae's childhood friend. His parents are divorced and he lives with his father, but uses his mother's maiden name. He is later revealed to be a voice actor and provides the voice to Akane from Kanchu Ranbu.
Kirari Nanashima (七島 光, Nanashima Kirari)
Voiced by: Sayuri Yahagi (Japanese); Brittney Karbowski (English)
Nozomu's little sister, who enjoys the magical girl anime, Puri Puri Moon.

=== Others ===
Shion (シオン, Shion)
Voiced by: Daisuke Namikawa (Japanese); Orion Pitts (English)
Played by: Asahi Ito (live-action film)
Shion is Kae's favorite character in her favorite anime, Mirage Saga, who dies in the show, shocking her.
Tera (テラ, Terra)
Voiced by: Kenjirō Tsuda (Japanese); Aaron Roberts (English)
A character in Mirage Saga and Amane is a big fan of Tera.
Lord (殿, Tono)
Voiced by: Daisuke Ono (Japanese); Aaron Roberts (English)
A character in Kanchu Ranbu who is modeled after fictional samurai Hyakki Sametora.
Akane (朱, Akane)
Voiced by: Shouta Aoi (Japanese); Greg Ayres (English)
A character in Kanchu Ranbu, he is a anthropomorphized version of Hyakki Sametora's iconic red armor.
Ruby (ルビー, Rubī)
Voiced by: Kazusa Aranami (Japanese); Tia Ballard (English)
A character in Puri Puri Moon and Kirari's favorite character later Kae Serinuma's cosplay character at her job at Usami Land.
Sapphire (サファイア, Safaia)
Voiced by: Yui Natsume (Japanese); Anastasia Munoz (English)
A character in Puri Puri Moon and Ruby's friend.
Diamond (ダイヤモンド, Daiyamondo)
Voiced by: Iori Nomizu (Japanese); Felecia Angelle (English)
A character in Puri Puri Moon. Sapphire and Ruby's friend.
Hyakki Sametora (百鬼サメトラ, Hyakki sametora)
Voiced by: Hideyuki Umezu (Japanese); Chris Rager (English)
He was a powerful samurai and later he was cursed. He is quite popular with anime fans as Kanchu Ranbu also Lord and Akane are based on him.
Murasawa (村沢, Murasawa)
Voiced by: Yuki Inoue (Japanese); Kristen McGuire (English)
She is a 2nd-year student and is Kae and Amane's classmate. She has a crush on Kazuma.
Tamura (田村, Tamura)
Voiced by: Rie Kawamura
She is a 2nd-year student and is Kae and Amane's classmate. She secretly has a crush on Kazuma.
Narita (成田, Narita)
Voiced by: Kumiko Oda (Japanese); Jeremy Inman (English)
She is a 2nd-year student and is Kae and Amane's classmate.
Kyoushi (教師, Kyōshi)
Voiced by: Takatsugu Awazu
Kyoushi is the teacher of Kae's class. He is a strict teacher and wants his students to achieve better grades.

== Production ==
Junko had been creating yaoi manga professionally since her debut in 2009, and after reading some of her works, a staff member from Bessatsu Friend invited her to contribute to the magazine. Junko decided to focus on an otome game concept, and after the editors had asked her to make the series comedic, Eiki Eiki suggested making jokes about fujoshi culture. Junko created Shima when she wanted to add a new male character to Kae's group and later decided to make her female.

== Media ==
=== Manga ===
Originally titled Boys, Please Kiss Him Instead of Me in Japan, the manga is written and illustrated by Junko. It was serialized in Kodansha's monthly manga magazine Bessatsu Friend from April 13, 2013, to February 13, 2018. Kodansha published fourteen tankōbon volume of the series.

Crunchyroll began releasing the manga in English online on September 5, 2014. A contest was held to determine the series' official English title, with Kiss Him, Not Me winning. Kodansha USA began publishing the physical edition in English on October 13, 2015.

==== Volume list ====
| No. | Original release date | Original ISBN | English release date | English ISBN |
|---|---|---|---|---|
| 1 | October 11, 2013 | 978-4-06-341879-8 | October 13, 2015 | 978-1-63-236202-5 |
| 2 | February 13, 2014 | 978-4-06-341903-0 | December 15, 2015 | 978-1-63-236203-2 |
| 3 | June 13, 2014 | 978-4-06-341919-1 | February 2, 2016 | 978-1-63-236206-3 |
| 4 | September 12, 2014 | 978-4-06-341939-9 | April 5, 2016 | 978-1-63-236207-0 |
| 5 | January 13, 2015 | 978-4-06-341960-3 | June 7, 2016 | 978-1-63-236264-3 |
| 6 | June 16, 2015 | 978-4-06-341988-7 | August 16, 2016 | 978-1-63-236265-0 |
| 7 | October 13, 2015 | 978-4-06-392010-9 | October 25, 2016 | 978-1-63-236298-8 |
| 8 | March 11, 2016 | 978-4-06-392030-7 | December 20, 2016 | 978-1-63-236299-5 |
| 9 | July 13, 2016 | 978-4-06-392050-5 | February 21, 2017 | 978-1-63-236343-5 |
| 10 | October 13, 2016 | 978-4-06-392081-9 | April 18, 2017 | 978-1-63-236344-2 |
| 11 | January 14, 2017 | 978-4-06-392098-7 | June 20, 2017 | 978-1-63-236437-1 |
| 12 | June 13, 2017 | 978-4-06-392118-2 | September 5, 2017 | 978-1-63-236493-7 |
| 13 | November 13, 2017 | 978-4-06-510393-7 | February 27, 2018 | 978-1-63-236556-9 |
| 14 | March 13, 2018 | 978-4-06-511050-8 | July 10, 2018 | 978-1-63-236557-6 |

=== Anime ===
An anime television adaptation of the manga was announced in the Bessatsu Friend magazine's April 2016 issue. Brain's Base produced the anime, with Hiroshi Ishiodori directing, Michiko Yokote handled the series composition and Kazuhiko Tamura designed the characters. The series aired in Japan from October 6 to December 22, 2016, and was simulcast by Crunchyroll, while Funimation streamed the English dub. Following Sony's acquisition of Crunchyroll, the dub was moved to Crunchyroll. The opening theme is "Prince×Prince" by From4to7 (Yūki Ono, Keisuke Koumoto, Yoshitsugu Matsuoka, and Nobunaga Shimazaki), while the ending theme is "Dokidoki no Kaze" (ドキドキの風; "Heart-pounding Wind") by Rie Murakawa. Anime Limited has licensed the series in the UK. The anime adapts the first 8 volumes of the manga.

==== Episode list ====
| No. | Title (Note: All English titles are taken from Funimation.) | Original release date |
|---|---|---|
| 1 | "Can She Do It? A Real Life Otome Game"; Transliteration: "Dekiru ka na? Riaru Otogē" (Japanese: できるかな？リアル乙女ゲー) | October 6, 2016 |
Kae Serinuma is an overweight fujoshi who enjoys yaoi pairings. She is horrified when her favorite character, Shion, is killed in the latest episode of Mirage Saga and spends an entire week locked up in her room. After losing weight from shock, her newfound beauty attracts the attention of her male schoolmates. During their movie date, Kae gives into her repressed urges when an anime shop has limited goods on sale, revealing to the boys that she is an otaku. Despite this, the boys accept Kae as she is.
| 2 | "The Strange Room And The Four High School Boys"; Transliteration: "Fushigi na o Heya to Yonnin no DK" (Japanese: 不思議なお部屋と4人のDK) | October 13, 2016 |
Kae is asked to fill in for the school's Soccer Club, only to quickly discover she has no idea how to play soccer. Nozomu decides to help Kae with her practice, and she ultimately manages to win the match by turning her flaw into an advantage. Later, the group get together at Kae's house to help her study for the exams, much to the ire of her brother, Takuro, who tries to shoo them away by revealing her fujoshi hobby.
| 3 | "The Clear and Blue Autumn Sky, and Passionate Otome"; Transliteration: "Tentakaku Otome Moe Yuru Aki" (Japanese: 天高く乙女萌ゆる秋) | October 20, 2016 |
Upon the arrival of the culture festival, the boys make an agreement to each spend thirty minutes alone with Kae without interference from the others. Kae is overwhelmed by the attention, and later becomes harassed by other students. The boys arrive to rescue her, and when the fight becomes violent, Kae urges them to stop, explaining that she is not used to having so much attention. The boys agree to take things more slowly with Kae.
| 4 | "Christmas in the Holy Land"; Transliteration: "Kurisumasu wa Seichi de" (Japanese: クリスマスは聖地で) | October 27, 2016 |
During Christmas Eve, the boys join Kae to Comiket. While they are sent to buy dōjinshi, Kae is harassed by a photographer but is rescued by a butler cosplayer. At school, she discovers that the cosplayer is a female underclassman named Shima Nishina. After being introduced to the boys, Shima invites everyone to act as models for her dōjinshi. When Kae offers her own advice for poses, Shima suddenly takes the initiative and Kae's first kiss.
| 5 | "Back to My Original Self! What Should I Do?"; Transliteration: "Moto ni Modotte Dōsunda" (Japanese: 元に戻ってどうすんだ) | November 3, 2016 |
Kae wins a special category from a Valentine's Day event for Mirage Saga. However, as a result of eating all of the leftover chocolate, she regains her original weight. The boys help her lose weight, later creating a reward system by providing her with yaoi fan service for every weight goal reached. During all of this, Yūsuke comes to realize that he loves her regardless of her appearance.
| 6 | "Let The Shipping Wars Begin!"; Transliteration: "Kappuringu Sensō Boppatsu!" (Japanese: カップリング戦争勃発！) | November 10, 2016 |
While obsessed with a new anime titled Kanchu Ranbu, Kae and Shima fall out with each other when they get into a heated argument over which of the two male leads should be the more dominant one. After the boys fail in an attempt to get them to make up with each other, Shima challenges Kae to a fanfiction writing competition. Recalling how she came to like Kae in the first place, Shima properly apologises to Kae and the two compromise by declaring their ship to have a reversible dynamic.
| 7 | "On A Journey to the Holy Land of Kachu☆Rabu"; Transliteration: "Seichi Junrei Kachu☆Rabu no Tabi" (Japanese: 聖地巡礼かちゅ☆らぶの旅) | November 17, 2016 |
Wanting to attend a requiem mass for the samurai, Kae and the others end up spending the night at an inn, where Yūsuke lands on top of Kae during a pillow fight. The next day, the gang attend the mass, look at a museum, and visit Sametora's grave. While taking swan boats to an island, the group gets swept up by a whirlpool and stranded, with Kae and Asuma becoming separated from the others. Afterwards, the gang learn that the curses they saw were apparently hallucinations caused by poisonous mushrooms they had for lunch.
| 8 | "I'm at a Disadvantage!"; Transliteration: "Ore wa Adobantēji Mainasu!" (Japanese: 俺はアドバンテージ・マイナス！) | November 24, 2016 |
While Nozomu worries that everyone has been making progress with Kae except him, Kae reveals she is working part-time at an amusement park, performing as part of a Puri Puri Moon stage show. As everyone else ends up getting various roles at the park as well, Nozomu, having experience with Puri Puri Moon. On the first day of practice, Nozomu comes down with a cold, so Kae comes over to his house to look after him. Delirious from the fever, Nozomu forces himself upon Kae and kisses her before Yūsuke stops him. As Kae ends up catching his cold and becoming afraid as a result, Nozomu apologizes for his actions and encourages Kae to get better in time for the stage show.
| 9 | "The Beach! Bathing Suits! Time to Get Serious!"; Transliteration: "Umi da Mizugi da Honki dasu!" (Japanese: 海だ水着だ本気出す!) | December 1, 2016 |
During a trip to the beach, Hayato's attempts to impress Kae keep either backfiring or getting upstaged by the others. While the others end up having to take another path after a bridge collapses, Kae catches up to Hayato and takes shelter in an abandoned hotel. With Kae in danger, Hayato manages to overcome his fear and deliver a swift kick to one of the delinquents, helping Kae to reunite with the others.
| 10 | "Brother Invasion"; Transliteration: "Ani, Shūrai" (Japanese: 兄, 襲来) | December 8, 2016 |
As the gang go on a treasure hunt near Mount Fuji after Asuma finds a map in the History Club, they become curious as to whether or not Asuma actually has any romantic feelings for Kae. After encountering a group of bats, Kae becomes separated from the others alongside Asuma, who she discovers is afraid of the dark. As Kae helps him get through the darkness and reunite with the others, Asuma starts to realise his own feelings for her.
| 11 | "Forward! Guard the Castle!"; Transliteration: "Iza Shutsudō!! Shiro Gādo!" (Japanese: いざ出動!! 城ガード!) | December 15, 2016 |
As everyone tries to do their part to protect Kae, Kazuma keeps hitting them back by exploiting their weaknesses. When Asuma tries to reason with him, Kazuma traps him in a locker, reminding him of when Kazuma trapped him in a storehouse when they were kids. With the support of his friends, Asuma manages to win the duel and realises his true feelings for Kae.
| 12 | "Kiss Him, Not Me"; Transliteration: "Watashi ga Motete Dōsunda" (Japanese: 私がモテてどうすんだ) | December 22, 2016 |
Following Asuma's declaration of his feelings, the others take extra measures to keep him from properly confessing to Kae. Feeling she can't make a decision without knowing everyone better, Kae decides to spend each day of the holiday going on dates with each of her suitors. As such, she goes to an aquarium with Yusuke, an amusement park with Nozomu, and alpaca farm with Hayato. After remaining uncertain following the dates, Kae ends up rekindling her love for Shion upon learning that he might be revived for a second season of Mirage Saga.

=== Film ===
A live-action film adaptation was announced in January 2020 and had a nationwide theatrical release in Japan on July 10, 2020. The film was directed by Norihisa Hiranuma, who also wrote the script along with Nami Kikkawa, Shōhei Fukuda, Kei Watanabe, and Daisuke Kamijō. It stars The Rampage from Exile Tribe member Hokuto Yoshino as Mutsumi, Asahi Ito as Nanashima, Fuju Kamio as Igarashi, and So Okuno as Shinomiya. E-girls member Nonoka Yamaguchi and Miu Tomita both star as Kae, with Yamaguchi playing her slim form and Tomita playing her pre-weight loss form. The theme song is "Watashi ga Motete Dōsunda" by Girls² (Misaki Tsuruya, Youka Ogawa, Kurea Masuda, Kira Yamaguchi, and Ran Ishii), who also make cameo appearances in the film. The extras in the film were played by students from EXPG. Additional cast members were announced on March 6, 2020, with the release of the film's official trailer, consisting of Miku Uehara, Ryōtarō Sakaguchi, Marina Mizushima, Zawachin, Satsuki Nakayama, Naho Toda, Shuto Miyazaki, and Mio Yūki. In addition, Asahi Ito, who plays Nanashima, also provides the voice to Shion. The dance sequence at the end of the film was choreographed by Akane from Tomioka High School's dance club, who is known for choreographing the "bubbly dance."

Upon release, the film debuted at #4 during opening weekend and earned a box office total of ¥51,320,380. Kentarou Muramatsu from Cinema Today gave the film 4 out of 5 stars, stating that the story was "a little rough" but that it "corrects" social norms, with extra praise towards Tomita's performance.

== Reception ==
Kiss Him, Not Me sold a cumulative total of over 3 million physical copies in Japan since January 2020. Volume 3 of the manga reached the 44th place on the weekly Oricon manga chart and, as of June 15, 2014, has sold 17,994 copies; volume 4 reached the 43rd place and, as of September 14, 2014, has sold 22,107 copies; volume 5 reached the 17th place and, as of January 18, 2015, has sold 41,112 copies.

The manga won Best Shōjo Manga at the 40th Kodansha Manga Awards. It was number four on the 2015 Kono Manga ga Sugoi! Top 20 Manga for Female Readers survey.

Publishers Weekly stated that the work is "a well-played farce filled with both laughter and empathy, no doubt helped by the author's background in yaoi."
