= Gū-Gū Datte Neko de Aru =

Japanese manga series

グーグーだって猫である
- Manga
- Written by: Yumiko Ōshima
- Live-action film
- Directed by: Isshin Inudo
- Released: September 6, 2008
- Runtime: 116
- Television drama
- Directed by: Isshin Inudo
- Written by: Ryū Takada
- Music by: Ren Takada
- Original network: WOWOW
- Original run: Q4 2014 – present

Gū-Gū Datte Neko de Aru (グーグーだって猫である) is a Japanese manga series written and illustrated by Yumiko Ōshima. It was adapted into a live action film in 2008. It was further adapted into a Japanese television drama broadcast by WOWOW. Season one of the drama aired in Q4 2014 and season two aired in Q3 2016.

== Characters ==
- Asako Oshima (played by Kyōko Koizumi in the film and by Rie Miyazawa in the TV series)
- Naomi (played by Juri Ueno)
- Seiji Sawamura (played by Ryo Kase)
- Mamoru (played by Naojiro Hayashi)
- Tatsuya (played by Tatsuya Isaka)
- Ça Va (played by Suzuka Ohgo)
- Taisuke Yamamoto (played by Asei Kobayashi)
- Asako's mother (played by Chieko Matsubara)
- Kyoko (played by Ai Takabe)
- Erika (played by Elisa Yanagi)
- Michiko (played by Kazuko Kurosawa)
- Sakie (played by Tomoko Murakami)
- Kanako (played by Miyuki Oshima)
- Umezu (played by Kazuo Umezu)
- Paul Weinberg (played by Marty Friedman)
- Karin Uno, Koichi Masuno, and additional actors

== Reception ==
Gou-Gou Datte Neko De Aru (Cher Gou-Gou…mon petit chat, mon petit ami) won the Short Award Prize at the 12th Tezuka Osamu Cultural Prize in 2008.
