= Junko (manga artist) =

Japanese manga artist

Junko ぢゅん子
- Born: November 28 Kanagawa Prefecture, Japan
- Pseudonym: Clip-Clop
- Notable works: Kimi Note; Kiss Him, Not Me
- Awards: Best Shōjo Manga (40th Kodansha Manga Awards)

Junko (ぢゅん子; born November 28) is a Japanese manga artist. She debuted professionally in 2009, producing yaoi manga for various magazines. Her 2010 series, Kimi Note, became her first breakthrough hit. In 2013, Junko released her first shōjo series Kiss Him, Not Me, which won Best Shōjo Manga at the 40th Kodansha Manga Awards.

== Career ==
Junko grew up reading yaoi manga and also drew yaoi fan art. She debuted professionally in 2009, creating manga for various yaoi magazines, and in 2010, Kimi Note became her first breakthrough hit. A staff member from Bessatsu Friend invited her to work on a series for their magazine after reading her works. After deciding on an otome game concept with, under Eiki Eiki's suggestion, jokes about the fujoshi culture, Junko created Kiss Him, Not Me. Kiss Him, Not Me was critically acclaimed, winning Best Shōjo Manga at the 40th Kodansha Manga Awards and surveyed as one of the best shōjo series in Kono Manga ga Sugoi! in 2015. After she ended the series in 2019, she began publishing Star-Crossed!! in Bessatsu Friend.

== Works ==
=== Series ===
Year	Title	Magazine	Notes
2009	Abarenbō Kareshi (暴れん坊♥彼氏)	Lynx	
2010	Kimi Nōto (キミノート)	Gush	
2010	The Prince's Time; Ōji no Kikan (王子の帰還)	Craft	
2011	Star-like Words (スターライクワーズ)	Gush	
2011	Mr. Mini Mart; Konbini-kun (コンビニくん。)	Chara Selection	
2012	Under the Umbrella, With You; Kasa no Shita, Futari (傘の下、ふたり)	Gush	
2012	Omamori Shimasu, Doko Made mo (お護りします、どこまでも)	Chara Selection	
2012	Prince of Recipe; Recipe no Ōji-sama (レシピの王子様)	Magazine Be × Boy	
2013	Kiss Him, Not Me; Watashi ga Motete Dōsunda (私がモテてどうすんだ)	Bessatsu Friend	
2019	Star-Crossed!! Wotadol: Oshi ga Watashi de Watashi ga Oshi de (ヲタドル 推しが私で 私が推しで)	Bessatsu Friend	
2024	Shirayuki Yume to n-Nin no Yume Kareshi (白雪友芽とn人の夢彼氏 )	Monthly Princess	
