= Noh-men Joshi no Hanako-san =

Japanese manga series

- First tankōbon volume cover

能面女子の花子さん
- Genre: Comedy, slice of life
- Manga
- Written by: Ryō Oda
- Published by: Kodansha
- Imprint: KCx
- Magazine: Itan (2015–2018); Be Love (2018–2023); Comic Days (2018–2023)
- Original run: April 7, 2015 – September 1, 2023
- Volumes: 9
- icon

Noh-men Joshi no Hanako-san (Japanese: 能面女子の花子さん; lit. 'Hanako, the Noh Girl') is a Japanese manga series written and illustrated by Ryō Oda. Preceded by a two one-shots published in Kodansha's josei manga magazine Itan in April and June 2015, the manga was serialized in the same magazine from August 2015 until June 2018, when the magazine ceased its print publication, and the series was transferred to the publisher's Be Love manga magazine and the Comic Days digital platform in August of that same year and finished in September 2023. Kodansha collected its chapters in nine tankōbon volumes.

== Publication ==
Written and illustrated by Ryō Oda, Noh-men Joshi no Hanako-san was preceded by two one-shots published in Kodansha's josei manga magazine Itan on April 7 and June 5, 2015, (Note: Published in the magazine's 25th and 26th issues, released on April 7 and June 5, 2015, respectively.) and its serialization began in the same magazine on August 7 of that same year. Itan finished its print publication on June 6, 2018, and the series was transferred to the publisher's Be Love on August 1 of that same year; it was also published on the Comic Days digital platform starting on August 7 of that same year. The series finished in Be Love on September 1, 2023. Kodansha collected its chapters in nine tankōbon volumes, released from April 7, 2016, to November 13, 2023.

=== Volumes ===
No.	Release date	ISBN
1	April 7, 2016	978-4-06-380844-5
2	January 6, 2017	978-4-06-380890-2
3	October 6, 2017	978-4-06-380955-8
4	August 7, 2018	978-4-06-512496-3
5	August 7, 2019	978-4-06-516781-6
6	November 13, 2020	978-4-06-521425-1
7	October 13, 2021	978-4-06-525701-2
8	September 13, 2022	978-4-06-529273-0
9	November 13, 2023	978-4-06-533868-1

== Reception ==
Alongside Chūgakusei Nikki, Noh-men Joshi no Hanako-san ranked nineteenth on Takarajimasha's Kono Manga ga Sugoi! list of top manga of 2017 for female readers. It ranked seventh on the "Nationwide Bookstore Employees' Recommended Comics" by the Honya Club website in 2018.
