= Nina the Starry Bride =

Japanese manga series

- First tankōbon volume cover

星降る王国のニナ (Hoshifuru Ōkoku no Nina)
- Genre: Historical fantasy
- Manga
- Written by: Rikachi
- Published by: Kodansha
- English publisher: NA: Kodansha USA
- Magazine: Be Love
- Original run: October 1, 2019 – present
- Volumes: 19
- Anime television series
- Directed by: Kenichiro Komaya
- Written by: Yuka Yamada
- Music by: Natsumi Tabuchi
- Studio: Signal.MD
- Licensed by: Crunchyroll
- Original network: Tokyo MX, BS Asahi
- Original run: October 10, 2024 – December 26, 2024
- Episodes: 12
- icon

Nina the Starry Bride (Japanese: 星降る王国のニナ, Hepburn: Hoshifuru Ōkoku no Nina; lit. "Nina from the Kingdom of Falling Stars") is a Japanese manga series written and illustrated by Rikachi. The series began serialization in Be Love in October 2019. As of July 2026, the series has been collected into nineteen tankōbon volumes. An anime television series adaptation produced by Signal.MD aired from October to December 2024.

In 2022, Nina the Starry Bride won the 46th Kodansha Manga Award in the shōjo category.

== Premise ==
Nina is an orphan living in the fantasy land of Fortuna. Discovered by Prince Azure, her unusual blue eyes bears a similarity to the deceased Princess Alisha, who was due to be married off to a powerful neighboring country. Thus, Prince Azure hatches a plot to have Nina take Princess Alisha's place, but the two become drawn to each other.

== Characters ==
Nina (ニナ)
Voiced by: Minami Tanaka (Japanese); Jill Harris (English)
Azure (アズール, Azūru)
Voiced by: Yūichirō Umehara (Japanese); Ben Stegmair (English)
Sett (セト, Seto)
Voiced by: Koki Uchiyama (Japanese); Austin Tindle (English)
Muhulum (ムフルム, Mufurumu)
Voiced by: Nao Tōyama (Japanese); Emi Lo (English)
Dytus (ダイタス, Daitasu)
Voiced by: Tatsuya Tomizawa (Japanese); Daniel Van Thomas (English)
Yor (ヨル, Yoru)
Voiced by: Seiichiro Yamashita (Japanese); Alejandro Saab (English)
Bidoh (ビドー, Bidō)
Voiced by: Kaito Ishikawa (Japanese); Joshua Waters (English)
Toat (トート, Tōto)
Voiced by: Shun Horie (Japanese); Lee George (English)
Hikami (ヒカミ)
Voiced by: Mitsuki Saiga (Japanese); Corey Wilder (English)
Anne (アン, An)
Voiced by: Masumi Tazawa (Japanese); Jalitza Delgado (English)

== Media ==
=== Manga ===
Written and illustrated by Rikachi, the series began serialization in Be Love on October 1, 2019. As of July 2026, the series' individual chapters have been collected into nineteen tankōbon volumes.

In February 2021, Kodansha USA announced that they licensed the series for English publication. During their panel at Anime NYC 2022, Kodansha USA announced a print release for Fall 2023.

==== Volumes ====
No.	Original release date	Original ISBN	English release date	English ISBN
1	March 13, 2020	978-4-06-518717-3	April 13, 2021 (digital); October 24, 2023 (print)	978-1-63699-045-3 (digital); 978-1-64651-860-9 (print)
2	July 13, 2020	978-4-06-520217-3	May 11, 2021 (digital); December 26, 2023 (print)	978-1-63699-097-2 (digital); 978-1-64651-861-6 (print)
3	October 13, 2020	978-4-06-520983-7	June 8, 2021 (digital); March 5, 2024 (print)	978-1-63699-148-1 (digital); 978-1-64651-862-3 (print)
4	February 12, 2021	978-4-06-522365-9	August 17, 2021 (digital); May 14, 2024 (print)	978-1-63699-303-4 (digital); 978-1-64651-863-0 (print)
5	June 11, 2021	978-4-06-523658-1	October 19, 2021 (digital); June 25, 2024 (print)	978-1-63699-420-8 (digital); 978-1-64651-864-7 (print)
6	October 13, 2021	978-4-06-525681-7	February 22, 2022 (digital); September 24, 2024 (print)	978-1-63699-632-5 (digital); 978-1-64651-865-4 (print)
7	February 10, 2022	978-4-06-526769-1	August 16, 2022 (digital); October 29, 2024 (print)	978-1-68491-399-2 (digital); 978-1-64651-866-1 (print)
8	July 13, 2022	978-4-06-528572-5	December 20, 2022 (digital); March 11, 2025 (print)	978-1-68491-600-9 (digital); 978-1-64651-867-8 (print)
9	November 11, 2022	978-4-06-529878-7	May 2, 2023 (digital); April 29, 2025 (print)	978-1-68491-893-5 (digital); 978-1-64651-990-3 (print)
10	March 13, 2023	978-4-06-531144-8	August 15, 2023 (digital); June 24, 2025 (print)	979-8-88933-100-1 (digital); 979-8-88877-058-0 (print)
11	August 10, 2023	978-4-06-532772-2; 978-4-06-532789-0 (SE)	January 9, 2024 (digital); August 26, 2025 (print)	979-8-88933-421-7 (digital); 979-8-88877-204-1 (print)
12	December 13, 2023	978-4-06-534052-3	May 14, 2024 (digital); October 28, 2025 (print)	979-8-88933-490-3 (digital); 979-8-88877-278-2 (print)
13	April 12, 2024	978-4-06-535302-8	September 10, 2024 (digital); December 30, 2025 (print)	979-8-89478-011-5 (digital); 979-8-88877-387-1 (print)
14	September 12, 2024	978-4-06-536824-4	February 11, 2025 (digital); February 24, 2026 (print)	979-8-89478-369-7 (digital); 979-8-88877-534-9 (print)
15	November 13, 2024	978-4-06-537571-6	June 10, 2025 (digital); April 28, 2026 (print)	979-8-89478-553-0 (digital); 979-8-88877-556-1 (print)
16	April 11, 2025	978-4-06-538800-6	October 7, 2025 (digital); June 30, 2026 (print)	979-8-89478-725-1 (digital); 979-8-88877-677-3 (print)
17	September 12, 2025	978-4-06-540749-3	February 10, 2026 (digital); September 1, 2026 (print)	979-8-89478-890-6 (digital); 979-8-88877-897-5 (print)
18	February 13, 2026	978-4-06-542673-9	May 12, 2026 (digital)	979-8-89830-103-3
19	July 13, 2026	978-4-06-544210-4; 978-4-06-544209-8 (SE)	—	—

=== Anime ===
An anime television series adaptation was announced on November 30, 2023. It is produced by Signal.MD and directed by Kenichiro Komaya, with scripts written by Yuka Yamada, character designed by Kyoko Taketani, and music composed by Natsumi Tabuchi. The series aired from October 10 to December 26, 2024, on Tokyo MX and BS Asahi. The opening theme song (from episode 02 onwards) is "Nina" performed by Maaya Sakamoto, while the ending theme song is "Hoshi no Dengon" (Messages From the Stars) performed by Nao Tōyama. Crunchyroll is streaming the series three days ahead of its Japanese broadcast.

==== Episodes ====
No.	Title	Directed by	Written by	Storyboarded by	Original release date
1	"The Origin of Sin"; Transliteration: "Tsumi no Hajimari" (Japanese: 罪のはじまり)	Kazuho Kunimoto	Yuka Yamada	Shinji Ushiro	October 10, 2024
2	"The Lost Name"; Transliteration: "Ushinawareta Namae" (Japanese: 失われた名前)	Ikuhiro Matsui	Yuka Yamada	Shinji Ushiro	October 17, 2024
3	"The Night of Dreams"; Transliteration: "Yume Saku Yoru" (Japanese: 夢咲く夜)	Kazuya Mitsuhashi	Yuka Yamada	Shinji Ushiro	October 24, 2024
4	"The Day of Departure"; Transliteration: "Shuttatsu no Hi" (Japanese: 出立の日)	Kumaneko Ankoku	Yuka Yamada	Shinji Ushiro	October 31, 2024
5	"Crimson Eyes"; Transliteration: "Shinku no Hitomi" (Japanese: 深紅の瞳)	Kazuya Mitsuhashi	Yuka Yamada	Shinji Ushiro	November 7, 2024
6	"The First Princess"; Transliteration: "Hajimete no Hime" (Japanese: はじめての姫)	Kazuho Kunimoto	Yuka Yamada	Shinji Ushiro	November 14, 2024
7	"The Great Nation's Dream"; Transliteration: "Taikoku no Yume" (Japanese: 大国の夢)	Ryū Yajima	Yuka Yamada	Shinji Ushiro	November 21, 2024
8	"Memories of Blood"; Transliteration: "Chi no Kioku" (Japanese: 血の記憶)	Ikuhiro Matsui	Yuka Yamada	Shinji Ushiro	November 28, 2024
9	"The Window of Love"; Transliteration: "Kesō no Mado" (Japanese: 懸想の窓)	Kaihang Chen	Yuka Yamada	Shinji Ushiro	December 5, 2024
10	"Mouth of Money, Heart of Gall"; Transliteration: "Kōmitsu Fukuken" (Japanese: 口蜜腹剣)	Ryū Yajima	Yuka Yamada	Shinji Ushiro	December 12, 2024
11	"The Love that Cannot Be"; Transliteration: "Aite Awazaru Koi" (Japanese: 逢ひて逢わざる恋)	Pei Ni Hong	Yuka Yamada	Takashi Tsuge; Kazuya Mihashi	December 19, 2024
12	"The Fate of the Stars"; Transliteration: "Hoshi no Yukue" (Japanese: 星のゆくえ)	Kazuho Kunimoto	Yuka Yamada	Shinji Ushiro; Takashi Tsuge	December 26, 2024

== Reception ==
Nina the Starry Bride won the 46th Kodansha Manga Award in the shōjo category in 2022. Yuka Shiraishi from Real Sound listed the series as the sixth Best Manga in 2021.

Brianna Fox-Priest from Otaku USA praised character designs and story, and stated "There are more thrilling romance manga out, but this one has room to grow. Judging by the covers of future installments, Nina The Starry Bride has more story to unfold". As part of Anime News Network's spring 2021 manga guide, Rebecca Silverman and Lynzee Loveridge reviewed the series for the website. Silverman praised the main protagonist, artwork, story, and stated "It is worth reading. The art is clean and shows some beautiful use of detail especially in the clothes, there is just enough intrigue to keep things moving". Loveridge had similar opinions about the series.
