= Shura no Mon =

Japanese manga series by Masatoshi Kawahara

- Cover of the first tankōbon cover, featuring Mutsu Tsukumo (right)

修羅の門 (Shura no Mon)
- Genre: Martial arts
- Manga
- Written by: Masatoshi Kawahara
- Published by: Kodansha
- Magazine: Monthly Shōnen Magazine
- Original run: April 1987 – November 1996
- Volumes: 31
- Manga

Mutsu Enmei-ryū Gaiden: Shura no Toki
- Written by: Masatoshi Kawahara
- Published by: Kodansha
- Magazine: Monthly Shōnen Magazine
- Original run: July 1989 – October 2025
- Volumes: 26
- Anime television series

Shura no Toki – Age of Chaos
- Directed by: Shin Misawa
- Written by: Junki Takegami
- Music by: Yutaka Minobe; Hideaki Kobayashi
- Studio: Media Factory, Studio Comet
- Licensed by: NA: AnimeWorks
- Original network: TXN (TV Tokyo)
- Original run: April 6, 2004 – September 28, 2004
- Episodes: 26
- Manga

Shura no Mon: Daini Mon
- Written by: Masatoshi Kawahara
- Published by: Kodansha
- Magazine: Monthly Shōnen Magazine
- Original run: October 2010 – June 2015
- Volumes: 18
- Manga

Shura no Mon: Fudekage
- Written by: Masatoshi Kawahara
- Published by: Kodansha
- Magazine: Monthly Shōnen Magazine
- Original run: December 2010 – December 2014
- Volumes: 8

Shura no Mon (修羅の門; lit. 'Asura's Gate') is a Japanese manga series written and illustrated by Masatoshi Kawahara. The story follows a young Karate practitioner named Tsukumo Mutsu, 40th master of the deadly Mutsu Enmei Ryu style. It was serialized in Kodansha's Monthly Shōnen Magazine from April 1987 to November 1996. The individual chapters were collected and published in 31 tankōbon volumes published between October 1987 and May 1997.

A prequel series, Mutsu Enmei-ryū Gaiden: Shura no Toki also ran in Monthly Shōnen Magazine, premiering in July 1989 and running on an irregular base until October 2025. Its chapters were published in 26 tankōbon volumes by Kodansha as of October 2025. It was adapted into a 26-episode anime series by Media Factory and Studio Comet that aired from April 6, 2004, until September 28, 2004, and is licensed for release in North America by Media Blasters.

Shura no Mon received the 1990 Kodansha Manga Award for the shōnen category, and has sold over 30 million copies. A sequel called Shura no Mon: Daini Mon and a Spin-Off titled Shura no Mon: Fudekage, were published from 2010 to 2015 and 2010 to 2014, respectively. A newer spin off titled Mutsu Enmei-ryū Ikaiden: Shura no Mon - Mutsu-san wa Chō Tsuyoi?! Had a one shot published in February 2020 before beginning serialization in March 2023. It is ongoing with 18 volumes released.

== Media ==
=== Manga ===
Written and illustrated by Masatoshi Kawahara, Shura no Mon was serialized in Monthly Shōnen Magazine from April 1987 to November 1996. The individual chapters were collected and published in Japan in 31 tankōbon volumes by Kodansha between October 8, 1987, and May 16, 1997.

A prequel series, Mutsu Enmei-ryū Gaiden: Shura no Toki (陸奥圓明流外伝 修羅の刻), began serialization in the same magazine in July 1989 where it ran on an irregular base until October 2025. It was collected and published in 24 tankōbon volumes between February 13, 1990, and August 12, 2025. Five aizōban volumes of the series were also released between March 19, 2004, and July 21, 2004.

In 2010, a sequel and a spin-off series started in Monthly Shōnen Magazine: Shura no Mon: Daini Mon (修羅の門 第弐門) and Shura no Mon: Fudekage (修羅の門異伝 ふでかげ). The first was serialized from November 2010 to January 2015, and compiled into 16 volumes published from March 19, 2011, and April 17, 2015. The second one transformed Shura no Mon's into a soccer manga. It was published from December 2010 to December 2014, and its eight volumes were released from June 17, 2011, to January 16, 2015.

=== Anime ===
Three of the story arcs from the prequel series were adapted into a 26-episode anime series by Media Factory and Studio Comet. It premiered on TV Tokyo on April 6, 2004, and ran until September 28, 2004. Media Blasters licensed the series for distribution in North America.

== Video games ==
Title	System	Release date
Shura no Mon (Sega)	Mega Drive	August 7, 1992
Shura no Mon (Kodansha)	PlayStation	April 2, 1998

== Reception ==
Shura no Mon received the 1990 Kodansha Manga Award for the shōnen category.

As of April 2015, the complete series had sold over 30 million copies in Japan.
