= Kōtarō Makaritōru! =

Japanese manga series

- First tankōbon volume cover

コータローまかりとおる!
- Manga
- Written by: Tatsuya Hiruta
- Published by: Kodansha
- Magazine: Weekly Shōnen Magazine
- Original run: August 25, 1982 – August 10, 1994
- Volumes: 59
- Manga

Shin Kōtarō Makaritōru!: Jūdō-hen
- Written by: Tatsuya Hiruta
- Published by: Kodansha
- Magazine: Weekly Shōnen Magazine
- Original run: September 7, 1994 – January 31, 2001
- Volumes: 27
- Manga

Kōtarō Makaritōru! L
- Written by: Tatsuya Hiruta
- Published by: Kodansha
- Magazine: Weekly Shōnen Magazine (2001–2002); Magazine Special (2002–2004)
- Original run: May 16, 2001 – July 20, 2004
- Volumes: 8
- icon

Kōtarō Makaritōru! (コータローまかりとおる!; "Kōtarō Forces His Way Through!") is a Japanese manga series written and illustrated by Tatsuya Hiruta. It was serialized in Kodansha's shōnen manga magazine Weekly Shōnen Magazine from 1982 to 1994, with its chapters collected in 59 tankōbon volumes. It was followed by two sequel series: Shin Kōtarō Makaritōru!, serialized from 1995 to 2001, with its chapters collected in 27 volumes, and Kōtarō Makaritōru! L, serialized from 2001 to 2004 and collected in eight volumes.

In 1986, Kōtarō Makaritōru! won the 10th Kodansha Manga Award in the shōnen category.

== Characters ==
Kōtarō Shindō
A high-school-aged karate prodigy who is descended from a long line of ninja. Although a fighting genius, he lacks common sense and inhibitions, but has a strong sense of justice. He is frequently in trouble with school officials, and often attempts to steal girls' underwear, especially his friend Mayumi's. He is very protective of his long hair, his collection of stolen underwear, and Mayumi.
Mayumi Watase
Captain of the 7th Discipline Squad, Mayumi is Kōtarō's childhood friend and main romantic interest. She is the only person who is able to keep Kōtarō under control. Although not as skilled as Kōtarō, she is proficient in the basics of karate and judo. She is also a member of the school's Decency League, in spite of Kōtarō's disapproval.
Teruhiko Tenkōji
A bald samurai who patrols the school as the enforcer of the Decency League. He initially appears to be an enemy of Kōtarō, but as the series progresses he gradually becomes his main rival and best friend. He comes from a traditional upper-class family and has an iinazuke (fiancée chosen by his parents) named Sayoko. He is highly sensitive about mockery of his baldness, and maintains that his head is actually shaved. He is the only character in the series whose fighting ability is equivalent to Kōtarō's, though they have never fought on genuinely even terms, and it is implied that both of them are reluctant to do so, in case it jeopardises their friendship.

== Publication ==
Written and illustrated by Tatsuya Hiruta, Kōtarō Makaritōru! was serialized in Kodansha's shōnen manga magazine Weekly Shōnen Magazine from August 25, 1982, to August 10, 1994. Kodansha collected its chapters in 59 tankōbon volumes, released from January 20, 1983, to December 14, 1994.

A sequel, titled Shin Kōtarō Makaritōru!: Jūdō-hen (新・コータローまかりとおる! 柔道編), was serialized in the same magazine from September 7, 1994, to January 31, 2001. Kodansha collected its chapters in 27 tankōbon volumes, released from March 16, 1995, to March 16, 2001.

A third series, Kōtarō Makaritōru! L (コータローまかりとおる！L), was serialized in the same magazine from May 16, 2001, (Note: It started in the magazine's 24th issue of 2001 (cover date May 30), released on May 16 of the same year.) to August 7, 2002. (Note: Its last chapter published in the magazine was in the combined 36th–37th issue of 2002, released on August 7 of the same year.) It was then transferred to Magazine Special, where it was published from December 18, 2002, to July 20, 2004; the series remains incomplete due to the author's poor health. Kodansha collected its chapters in eight tankōbon volumes, released from October 17, 2001, to October 15, 2004.

== Other media ==
Kōtarō was featured as a playable character in Weekly Shōnen Sunday and Weekly Shōnen Magazine 2009 crossover game Sunday vs Magazine: Shūketsu! Chōjō Daikessen released for the PlayStation Portable (PSP).

== Reception ==
In 1986, Kōtarō Makaritōru! won the 10th Kodansha Manga Award for the shōnen category.
