= Sanju Mariko =

Japanese manga series

- First tankōbon volume cover, featuring Koda Mariko

傘寿まり子
- Manga
- Written by: Yuki Ozawa
- Published by: Kodansha
- Imprint: Be Love KCDX
- Magazine: Be Love
- Original run: June 1, 2016 – June 1, 2021
- Volumes: 16
- icon

Sanju Mariko (Japanese: 傘寿まり子; lit. 'Mariko at 80') is a Japanese manga series written and illustrated by Yuki Ozawa. It was serialized in Kodansha's josei manga magazine Be Love from June 2016 to June 2021, with its chapters collected in 16 tankōbon volumes. In 2018, the manga won the 42nd Kodansha Manga Award in the general category.

== Plot ==
Koda Mariko is an 80-year-old veteran writer. Her husband died, and she lives with her son and his wife, her grandchildren and her great-grandchildren for four generations. Realizing that she is being treated as a nuisance by her son and his wife and her grandson, Mariko decides to leave her home at the age of 80 and become independent.

== Publication ==
Written and illustrated by Yuki Ozawa, Sanju Mariko, was serialized in Kodansha's josei manga magazine Be Love from June 1, 2016, to June 1, 2021. Kodansha collected its chapters in 16 tankōbon volumes, released from November 11, 2016, to July 13, 2021.

=== Volumes ===
| No. | Release date | ISBN |
|---|---|---|
| 1 | November 11, 2016 | 978-4-06-393074-0 |
| 2 | February 13, 2017 | 978-4-06-393143-3 |
| 3 | May 12, 2017 | 978-4-06-393191-4 |
| 4 | September 13, 2017 | 978-4-06-393271-3 |
| 5 | December 13, 2017 | 978-4-06-510642-6 |
| 6 | April 13, 2018 | 978-4-06-511368-4 |
| 7 | July 13, 2018 | 978-4-06-512216-7 |
| 8 | November 13, 2018 | 978-4-06-513595-2 |
| 9 | March 13, 2019 | 978-4-06-514899-0 |
| 10 | July 12, 2019 | 978-4-06-516375-7 |
| 11 | November 13, 2019 | 978-4-06-517654-2 |
| 12 | March 13, 2020 | 978-4-06-518825-5 |
| 13 | July 13, 2020 | 978-4-06-520215-9 |
| 14 | November 13, 2020 | 978-4-06-521395-7 |
| 15 | March 12, 2021 | 978-4-06-522574-5 |
| 16 | July 13, 2021 | 978-4-06-524000-7 |

== Reception ==
By February 2018, the manga had over 250,000 copies in circulation.

On Takarajimasha's Kono Manga ga Sugoi! list of best manga of 2018 for female readers, the series ranked sixth. The manga was nominated for the 22nd Tezuka Osamu Cultural Prize in 2018. Alongside Fragile, the manga won the 42nd Kodansha Manga Award in the general category in 2018.
