= Aishiteru: Kaiyō =

Japanese manga series

- First tankōbon volume cover

アイシテル〜海容〜
- Manga
- Written by: Minoru Itō
- Published by: Kodansha
- Magazine: Be Love
- Original run: September 15, 2006 – February 1, 2007
- Volumes: 2
- Television drama
- Original network: Nippon TV
- Original run: April 15, 2009 – June 17, 2009
- Episodes: 10
- Manga

Aishiteru: Kizuna
- Written by: Minoru Itō
- Published by: Kodansha
- Magazine: Be Love
- Original run: May 1, 2010 – September 15, 2010
- Volumes: 2
- Live-action television film

Aishiteru: Kizuna
- Released: September 21, 2011

Aishiteru: Kaiyō (アイシテル〜海容〜; "I Love You: Forgiveness") is a Japanese manga series written and illustrated by Minoru Itō. It was serialized in Kodansha's josei manga magazine Be Love from September 2006 to February 2007, with its chapters collected in two tankōbon. A 10-episode television drama adaptation was broadcast on Nippon TV from April to June 2009.

A second manga series, titled Aishiteru: Kizuna was serialized in Be Love from May to September 2010. A television film adaptation was broadcast on Nippon TV in September 2011.

== Plot ==
The story follows two families whose lives are shattered when a young boy is murdered. Seiko Ozawa lives in Tokyo with her husband and two children, including her young son Kiyotaka, whom she loves deeply. One day, Kiyotaka goes missing and is later found murdered, devastating Seiko and her family and drawing national attention to the case.

The police investigation eventually reveals that the perpetrator is Tomoya Noguchi, an 11-year-old boy from another family in the same community. Tomoya lives with his mother Satsuki and father Kazuhiko, and had been a quiet, emotionally withdrawn child who struggled to communicate with his parents. As the truth behind the murder gradually comes to light, the story follows both families: Seiko as the mother of the victim coping with grief, anger, and the loss of her child, and Satsuki as the mother of the perpetrator confronting her son's actions and questioning her own role as a parent.

== Media ==
=== Manga ===
Written and illustrated by Minoru Itō, Aishiteru: Kaiyō was serialized in Kodansha's josei manga magazine Be Love from September 15, 2006, (Note: It started in the magazine's 19th issue of 2006, released on September 15 of that same year.) to February 1, 2007. (Note: It finished in the magazine's fourth issue of 2007, released on February 1 of that same year.) Kodansha collected its chapters in two tankōbon volumes released on March 6, 2007.

Another series, titled Aishiteru: Kizuna (アイシテル〜絆〜), was serialized in Be Love from May 1 to September 15, 2010. Kodansha collected its chapters in two tankōbon volumes released on December 13, 2010.

=== Drama ===
A 10-episode television drama adaptation was broadcast from April 15 to June 17, 2009. A television film, based on Aishiteru: Kizuna, was released on September 21, 2011.

==== Cast ====
- Izumi Inamori – Satsuki Noguchi
- Masaki Okada – Naoto
- Osamu Mukai – Tomoya
- Asami Mizukawa – Kana Suma

== Reception ==
The drama series received the Grand Prix at the Tokyo Drama Awards in 2009.
