= Masatoshi Kawahara =

Japanese manga artist

Masatoshi Kawahara (川原 正敏, Kawahara Masatoshi, born 17 August 1960 in Mihara, Hiroshima) is a Japanese manga artist. He is best known as the author of the long-running series Shura no Mon and its prequel Shura no Toki, for which he won the Kodansha Manga Award for shōnen in 1989.
