= Hiromu Ono =

Japanese manga artist

- Born: September 13 Kure, Hiroshima, Japan
- Area: Manga artist
- Notable works: Lady Love
- Awards: 8th Kodansha Manga Award for shōjo manga – Lady Love

Hiromu Ono (小野弥夢, Ono Hiromu) is a Japanese manga artist. In 1984, she won the Kodansha Manga Award for shōjo for Lady Love.
