= Yōko Shōji =

Japanese manga artist

- Born: 4 June 1950 (age 75)
- Occupation: manga artist
- Awards: 1978 Kodansha Manga Award (Seito Shokun!)

Yōko Shōji (庄司 陽子, Shōji Yōko; born 4 June 1950, in Mobara, Chiba) is a Japanese manga artist. She is best known for writing Seito Shokun! (Attention Students!), for which she won the Kodansha Manga Award for shōjo in 1978.
