= List of manga published by Kodansha =

A list of manga published by Kodansha (and their subsidiaries Kobunsha and Scola), listed by release date.

== 1930s ==
=== 1931 ===
- Norakuro

=== 1933 ===
- Bōken Dankichi

=== 1934 ===
- Tank Tankuro

=== 1935 ===
- Hinomaru Hatanosuke

== 1940s ==
=== 1946 ===
- Putcher in Wonderland

=== 1949 ===
- Anmitsu Hime

== 1950s ==
=== 1950 ===
- Kimba the White Lion

=== 1951 ===
- Age of Adventure
- Ambassador Atom

=== 1952 ===
- The Adventure of Rock
- Astro Boy
- Rock on Volcano Island
- Skyscraper Kid

=== 1953 ===
- The 13 Secrets
- Princess Knight
- Sing, Penny

=== 1954 ===
- '32 Ford
- Chief Detective Kenichi
- The Devil of the Earth

=== 1956 ===
- The Crane's Fountain
- Phoenix
- Tetsujin 28-go

=== 1957 ===
- Whirlwind Z

=== 1958 ===
- Angel in the Dark
- Hurricane Z
- Moonlight Mask
- Peacock Shell
- The Twin Knights

=== 1959 ===
- 13-Gō Hasshin Seyo
- Apatchi Tōshu
- Bōken Senchō
- Donguri March
- Hayate Jūjisei
- The Merchant of Venice
- Mon Yoshi-kun
- Ōnishi Kyojin
- Patorōru Q
- Ryōta wa Makenai
- Sakon Ukon
- Sandaru Santa
- Song of the White Peacock
- Tenji Doji
- Tsuppari Tarō

== 1960s ==
=== 1960 ===
- Angel's Hill
- Banzai Tantei-chō
- Champion Futoshi
- Chikai no Makyū
- GeGeGe no Kitarō
- Kaiketsu Harimao
- Kuroi Himitsu Heiki
- Mahha Sanshirō
- Ohana-chan
- Shiden-kai no Taka

=== 1961 ===
- Fushigi na shōnen
- Garoro Q
- Sasuke
- The Strange Boy

=== 1962 ===
- 1•2•3 to 4•5•Roku
- Yuki no Taiyou

=== 1963 ===
- 8 Man
- Akuma-kun
- Shiden-kai no Taka

=== 1964 ===
- Marude Dameo
- Ninja Hattori-kun
- Pia no Shouzou
- Sarutobi Ecchan

=== 1965 ===
- Giant Mama
- Hangyojin
- Harris no Kaze
- Jajako-Chan
- Rainbow Sentai Robin
- Space Boy Soran

=== 1966 ===
- Akumu
- Cyborg 009
- Kagehime
- Kuroi Nekomen
- Misokkasu
- Reptilia
- Star of the Giants

=== 1967 ===
- Chibikko Kaiju Yadamon
- Nana to Lili
- Tensai Bakabon

=== 1968 ===
- Activist Student
- Akane-chan
- Ashita no Joe
- Bravo! Sensei
- Hana no Sanshiro
- Koya no Kenman
- Mini Mini Manga Dai-Koshin
- Pansy-chan
- Receive-chan
- Sanbiki no Kenman
- Tiger Mask
- Yuhi no Kenman

=== 1969 ===
- Bianca
- Kaze no Yō ni
- Triton of the Sea

== 1970s ==
=== 1970 ===
- Abandon the Old in Tokyo
- Akogare
- Attention Please
- Barom-1
- Bomba!
- Hulk: The Manga
- Skull Man
- Spider-Man: The Manga

=== 1971 ===
- Dekkai Chanto Atsumare
- Demon Lord Dante
- Karate Master
- Mad Dog Trotsky
- Mon Cherie Coco

=== 1972 ===
- Ashita Kagayaku
- Devilman
- Lay of the Rhine
- Lord Iechika Mogami
- Mama no Ojisama
- Old Folk's Home
- Samurai Executioner
- Suekko Taifuu
- Yakyū-kyō no Uta

=== 1973 ===
- Ai to Makoto
- Aries no Otome-tachi
- Cutie Honey
- Fisherman Sanpei
- Hotaru Minako
- Mazinger Z
- Onward Towards Our Noble Deaths
- Ore wa Teppei
- The Record of Peter Kürten
- Sensual Nights
- Violence Jack

=== 1974 ===
- Great Mazinger
- Hitoribocchi Ruca
- Iyahaya Nantomo
- Love Pack
- Path of the Assassin
- Teki wa Tsuyoi Zo Tegowai Zo!
- The Three-Eyed One

=== 1975 ===
- BC Adam
- Boy Detective Zumbera
- Candy Candy
- Haikara-San: Here Comes Miss Modern
- Steel Jeeg
- Uchu Enban Daisenso

=== 1976 ===
- Grendizer
- Lady Mitsuko
- Nonnon Plus 3
- Shutendoji
- UFO Robot Grendizer vs. Great Mazinger

=== 1977 ===
- Apollo's Song
- Black Jack
- Crime and Punishment
- The Film Lives On
- Lion Books
- Manga College
- Metamorphosis
- Nextworld
- Ode to Kirihito
- The Plains of Abusegahara
- Seito Shokun!
- The Shinsen-gumi
- Son-Goku the Monkey
- Umi no Aurora

=== 1978 ===
- Alabaster
- Benkei
- Captain Ken
- The Castle of Dawn
- Dove, Fly Up to Heaven
- Fusuke
- Futureman Kaos
- Grand Dolls
- Jet King
- Message from Space: Galactic Wars
- Microman
- Nemuta-kun
- Queen Emeraldas
- Rally Up, Mankind!
- Shōnen Jidai
- Shumari
- Super Taiheiki
- Tiger Books
- Tonda Couple
- The White Pilot
- Zero Men

=== 1979 ===
- The Ant and the Giant
- Brave Dan
- Coquelicot-zaka kara
- Dr. Thrill
- Dust 8
- Faust
- Flying Ben
- The Fossil Island
- General Onimaru
- The Golden Trunk
- Insect Collector
- Insect Collector - The Butterfly Road Smells of Death
- The Iron Road
- Kigen 2600 Nen no Playball
- Metropolis
- Ohayō! Spank
- SF Fancy Free
- SF Mix
- Susano Oh
- The Thief Akikazu Inoue
- The Vampires
- The Wonderful Journey

== 1980s ==
=== 1980 ===
- 21st Century Adventure
- Aiiro Shinwa
- The Amazing 3
- Ambassador Magma
- Andromeda Stories
- The Cactus Kid
- Chibidon
- Cinderella Boy
- Gambler Jiko Chuushinha
- Hyotan Komako
- Melody of Iron
- Lemon Kid
- Nanako SOS
- Number 7
- Rainbow Fortress
- Rise of the Birdmen
- The Road to Utopian Lurue
- Roppu-kun
- Tsubasa Aru Mono
- X-Point on the South Pacific
- Yokohama Monogatari

=== 1981 ===
- Ashita Tenki ni Naare
- Ayako
- Big X
- Captain Ozma
- Conbini Enchou
- Dororo
- Fang of the Sun Dougram
- The Flower of Kikuchiyo
- Himitsu Shirei 0059
- The Kabocha Wine
- Lady Love
- Let's Go! Shun-chan
- Little Fisherman
- The Monster of the 38th Parallel
- Musashi and Kojiro
- Nanto Magoroku
- Norman
- The Runaway Tanker
- Soup Man
- Spat Man X
- Tange Sazen
- Turtle Tales

=== 1982 ===
- Akira
- Adventure Broadcasting Station
- Astro Boy Chronicles
- Astro Boy Special
- Barbara
- Bats & Terry
- The Crater
- The Devil Garon
- Diary of Ma-chan
- Don Dracula
- Hakuriki Sensei
- I Am Sarutobi!
- I.L
- The Jungle Kingdom
- Kōtarō Makaritōru!
- Lost World
- Lunatic Japan
- The Magic House
- Men with Tails
- Microid S
- The Mysterious Underground
- Pippy
- Plamo-Kyoshiro
- Rags & Jewels
- Queer Arabian Nights
- Short Arabesque
- Son of Godfather
- Suspicion
- Volcanic Eruption
- Swallowing the Earth
- Under the Air

=== 1983 ===
- Aoi-chan Panic!
- Armored Trooper Votoms
- Aura Battler Dunbine
- Barabanba
- Baribari Legend
- Be-Bop High School
- The Book of Human Insects
- Buddha
- Burunga I
- Clockwork Apple
- Dr. Doronko
- The Euphrates Tree
- Ginga Hyōryū Vifam
- Ikki Mandara
- Iron Muscle
- Ironfist Chinmi
- Jiletta from Upside-Down
- Kosaku Shima
- Mako, Rumi and Chii
- Paper Fortress
- Queen Eggplant
- Thunder Mask
- Unico
- Yaketpachi's Maria

=== 1984 ===
- Attacker You!
- Bodaiju
- Ekushisu
- Gum Gum Punch
- Heavy Metal L-Gaim
- Kikou Kai Gallian
- Manga Seminar on Biology
- Marvelous Melmo
- Meimon! Takonishi Ouendan
- Mobile Suit Gundam MS Senki
- New Treasure Island
- Peace Concert
- Pia no Shouzou
- RC Kid
- RoboRobo Company
- Sports Robo Garrett
- What's Michael?

=== 1985 ===
- Appleseed
- Cooking Papa
- Darling Kishidan
- Fly! Rally
- Jigyaku no Uta
- Mobile Suit Zeta Gundam
- The Transformers

=== 1986 ===
- Bataashi Kingyo
- Cleopatra DC
- Dai-Tōkyō Binbō Seikatsu Manual
- G.I. Joe
- Ikenai Luna Sensei!
- Mienai Sakebi
- Mister Ajikko
- Mobile Suit Gundam ZZ
- N.Y. Komachi
- Shakotan Boogie
- Spirit of Wonder
- You're Under Arrest

=== 1987 ===
- 3×3 Eyes
- Barabanba 2
- Break Shot
- Goku Midnight Eye
- Kuchibiru kara Sandanjuu
- Meimon! Daisan-yakyūbu
- Miss! Police
- Osomatsu-kun
- Shin Plamo Kyoshiro
- Shura no Mon
- Transformers: The Headmasters

=== 1988 ===
- Aah! Harimanada
- Doctor K
- The Life of Genius Professor Yanagizawa
- Oh My Goddess!
- Okusama Shinkaron
- Ronin Warriors
- Shiratori Reiko de Gozaimasu!
- Showa: A History of Japan
- The Silent Service
- Super Mario
- Transformers: Super-God Masterforce
- Waru

=== 1989 ===
- 1+2=Paradise
- Adesugata Junjo Boy
- Bio Hunter
- Dear Boys
- Ghost in the Shell
- Goldfish Warning!
- Hajime no Ippo
- Hyper Frenzy Gundam Boy
- Love You
- Mobile Guit Gundam 0080: War in the Pocket
- Mutsu Enmei-ryū Gaiden: Shura no Toki
- OL Shinkaron
- Parasyte
- Rock'n Game Boy
- SD Gundam Gaiden Knight Gundam Monogatari Lacoa no Yuusha
- Transformers: Victory

== 1990s ==
=== 1990 ===
- Big in Japan, Putaro's Family
- Captain Kid
- Chameleon
- Compiler
- Dr. Mario
- Genji Tsūshin Agedama
- Gundlander
- Gunsmith Cats
- The Legend of Mother Sarah
- Naniwa Kin'yūdō
- Onnanoko no Fushigi
- Shonan Junai Gumi
- Shoot!
- Transformers: Zone

=== 1991 ===
- Blue Hole
- Boys Be...
- Codename: Sailor V
- Ganbare Goemon - Yukihime Kyuushutsu Emaki
- Ghost in the Shell 1.5: Human-Error Processor
- Ghost in the Shell 2: Man-Machine Interface
- Gon
- Hayate Densetsu Tokkō no Taku
- Kurenai Densetsu
- Miracle Girls
- Mobile Suit Gundam F91
- MR. Masashi
- Peacemaker
- Onnanoko no Honki
- Sailor Moon
- Shi to Kanojo to Boku
- World Apartment Horror
- ZeD

=== 1992 ===
- Assembler 0X
- Club 9
- Hayate Ultra Ninpocho
- Ice Blade
- Kamen Rider SD: Mighty Riders
- The Kindaichi Case Files
- Rockman
- Rockman 4
- Rockman 5
- Shirahime-Syo: Snow Goddess Tales
- Shōnen yo Racket o Idake
- Shōta no Sushi
- The Walking Man
- Wangan Midnight
- Weather Report Girl

=== 1993 ===
- Angel Gunfighter
- Atom Cat (Osamu Tezuka Complete Manga Works)
- Azuki-chan
- Bagi, The Boss of the Earth
- Blade of the Immortal
- The Cat Houseowner
- Chō Kuse ni Narisō
- Dan Dan Danku!
- Dominator
- Fatal Fury
- Fatal Fury 2
- The Four Fencers of the Forest
- Ganbare Goemon 2 - Kiteretsu Shougun Magginesu
- Goldfish Warning! Gaiden Ushi Ushi World
- Gringo (Osamu Tezuka Complete Manga Works)
- Hanada Shōnen Shi
- Hello! Chippo
- Hidamari no Ki
- Ikkyū
- J-Dream
- Kiko-chan's Smile
- Ludwig B
- Magic Knight Rayearth
- Meteor Prince
- MW (Osamu Tezuka Complete Manga Works)
- Onmyōji
- Ping-Pong Club
- Pornographic Pictures (Osamu Tezuka Complete Manga Works)
- Rockman 6
- Ryūrōden
- Say Hello to Bookila! (Osamu Tezuka Complete Manga Works)
- Sekai de Ichiban Yasashii Ongaku
- Seraphic Feather
- Shin Ganbare Goemon: Jigoku-hen
- The Secret of Piron
- Soyokaze-san
- The Storm Fairy (Osamu Tezuka Complete Manga Works)
- Tales of the Glass Castle
- Unico [First Grader] (Osamu Tezuka Complete Manga Works)
- Yugo

=== 1994 ===
- 8 Man After
- A.I. Love You
- The Adventures of Rubi
- Bakugyaku Familia
- Cave In
- Dr. Mars
- Farewell, Night
- Gakkou no Kowai Uwasa
- Ghost Hunt
- Harlem Beat
- Kidō Butōden G Gundam Gaiden Shōryū Densetsu
- Maya
- Mobile Fighter G Gundam
- Mutant Turtles
- Paprika
- Plasmo Wars
- Rainbow Parakeet
- Rockman X
- Super Mario / Donkey Kong
- X-Men
- Yokohama Kaidashi Kikou

=== 1995 ===
- Blue World
- Chūka Ichiban!
- Daikaijū Monogatari
- Donkey Kong Country 4Koma Gag Battle
- Dragon Head
- Duke Goblin
- The Earth War
- Initial D
- Fatal Fury 3
- Ganbare Goemon 3 - Shishi Juuroku Bee no Karakuri Manji Gatame
- Henachoko Daisakusen Z
- Hiroki Endo's Tanpenshu
- Jing: King of Bandits
- Kokuhaku wo Request
- The Men Who Created Rockman: The Legend of Rockman's Birth
- Midnight
- Mobile Suit Gundam Wing
- Mutant Turtles '95
- Neo Faust
- Nonchan Noriben
- Prime Rose
- Rockman 7
- Saiko Dokutā
- Saint Tail
- Street Fighter II V
- Super Donkey Kong with Mario
- Taimashin
- Taberemasen
- Vendémiaire no Tsubasa
- Yoshi's Island 4Koma Gag Battle

=== 1996 ===
- After War Gundam X
- Bad Company
- Cardcaptor Sakura
- Delicious!
- DESPERADO
- Ganbare Goemon Kirakira Douchuu
- HALF & HALF
- Inugami
- Kidō Butōden Gaiden Gundam Fight 7th
- Kurogane
- Lovely Angel
- Mars
- Message to Adolf
- Mutant Turtles '96
- Osamu Tezuka Essay Collection
- Osamu Tezuka Novel Collection
- Osamu Tezuka Talk Collection
- Osamu Tezuka's Scenario Collection
- Osamu Tezuka's Special Manga Course
- Pokémon 4Koma Gag Battle
- Psychometrer Eiji
- School Ghost Stories 2
- Super Mario 64
- Umi no Tairiku NOA
- Tobaku Mokushiroku Kaiji

=== 1997 ===
- Akechi Case Files
- Blame!
- Boys Be... 2nd Season
- Cannon God Exaxxion
- Clover
- Cyborg Kuro-chan
- Dear Boys: Act 2
- Dear Boys: The Early Days
- Detective Boy, Rock Holmes
- Devil Lady
- Dream Saga
- Eden: It's an Endless World!
- Enomoto: New Elements that Shake the World
- G-Taste
- Gachinko!
- Ganbaregoemon fu ~i ~ba a
- Great Teacher Onizuka
- Icaro
- Kami-Kaze
- Last Bronx 4Koma Gag Battle Hinotama Game Comic Series
- Legendary Gambler Tetsuya
- Medarot
- Miami Guns
- Mobile Suit Gundam Wing: Battlefield of Pacifists
- Mobile Suit Gundam: Blue Destiny
- New Mobile Report Gundam Wing Dual Story: G-Unit
- Osamu Tezuka Lecture Collection
- Peach Girl
- Q.E.D.
- Rockman 8
- Rockman MANIAX
- Sazae-san
- School Ghost Stories 3
- SD Gundam Fullcolor Theater
- Secrets of Osamu Tezuka's Manga
- Shin Tekken Chinmi
- Shota no Sushi: Zenkokutaikai-hen
- The Story of Tonkara Valley
- Ultra Ninpocho Kotobuki
- Wansa-kun
- Yume no Crayon Oukoku

=== 1998 ===
- Ago Nashi Gen to Ore Monogatari
- Beast Wars II: Super Life-Form Transformers
- Cyber Team in Akihabara
- Et Cetera
- Forest of Piano
- From Kobe
- Ganbare Goemon - Neo Momoyama Bakufu no Odori
- Gundam Wing: Endless Waltz
- Guru Guru Pon-chan
- Hey Pitan!
- Love Hina
- Microman: The Small Giant
- Mobile Suit Gundam: Char's Counterattack
- Rockman & Forte
- Small Giant Microman
- Shadow Star
- Super Doll★Licca-chan
- UFO Baby
- Ultra Ninpocho Cho
- Vagabond
- Z Mazinger

=== 1999 ===
- A Horse With No Name
- Amon: The Darkside of the Devilman
- Baby Pop
- Bakushou Mondai no Kyou no Joe
- Beck
- The Big O
- Culdcept
- Fighting Foodons
- Flint the Time Detective
- Fuun Sanshimai Lin³
- Garōden
- GetBackers
- Girl Got Game
- Hiwou War Chronicles
- Jing: King of Bandits: Twilight Tales
- Kitty Kitty Fancia
- The Legend of Mikazuchi
- Liquor Hermit Dayoon
- Medarot 2
- Medarotter Rintaro! Medarot R
- Mushishi
- Nani wa tomo Are
- Persona 2: Tsumi: 4Koma Gag Battle
- Planetes
- Power Stone
- Psychic Academy
- Rave Master
- Samurai Deeper Kyo
- Space Family Carlvinson
- Super Life-Form Transformers: Beast Wars Neo
- Transformers: Beast Wars Transmetals
- Turn A Gundam
- Wild Arms Flower Thieves
- Yui Shop

== 2000s ==
=== 2000 ===
- Batman: Child of Dreams
- Buraiden Gai
- Confidential Confessions
- Chobits
- Cromartie High School
- Date Groove
- Deus Vitae
- FLCL
- Flower of Eden
- Gin no Kodou
- Gründen
- Gyōten Ningen Batseelor
- Inu Neko Jump!
- Karate Shoukoushi Kohinata Minoru
- Maken X Another
- Medarot 3
- Microman Red Powers
- Mokke
- Nasu
- NOiSE
- Ohikkoshi
- Ojamajo Doremi
- Plastic Babies: Megami Ibunroku Persona & Persona 2: Tsumi
- Red Eyes
- SD Gundam Eiyuden
- Shadow Skill
- Shana ou Yoshitsune
- Shin Megami Tensei: Devil Children
- Skies of Arcadia
- Smuggler
- Sunō Dorufin
- Tobaku Hakairoku Kaiji
- Tokyo Mew Mew
- Tramps Like Us
- Ultra Cute
- Vampire Master Dark Crimson
- W's
- The Wallflower
- Xenon
- Zipang

=== 2001 ===
- 3.3.7 Byooshi!!
- A Perfect Day for Love Letters
- Baby Birth
- Big Star Daikichi
- Crush Gear Turbo
- Dead End
- Detective School Q
- Dragon Voice
- Getter Robo Armageddon
- GodHand Teru
- Golden Sun 4-Koma Gag Battle
- Gorio
- Gyōten Ningen Batseelor ~Gattsu to Oruka no Bouken Densetsu~
- Hot Shot
- Howling
- Idaten
- Instant Teen: Just Add Nuts
- Jipangu Hououden
- Kamen Rider Spirits
- Koi Kaze
- Kunimitsu no Matsuri
- Magical Shopping Arcade Abenobashi
- Medarot 4
- Medarot 5
- Medarot Navi
- Monkey Typhoon
- Mōtto! Ojamajo Doremi
- Nodame Cantabile
- Othello
- Parallel
- Pugyuru
- Sakuran
- SD Gundam Mushamaruden Trilogy
- Shaolin Sisters: Reborn
- Sharaku
- Shin Megami Tensei: 4Koma Gag Battle
- Shin Megami Tensei: Comic Anthology
- Shin Megami Tensei: Devil Children
- Shin Megami Tensei: Devil Children: 4Koma Gag Battle
- Stone
- Telepathic Wanderers
- Yume Tsukai
- Zodiac P.I.

=== 2002 ===
- Air Gear
- Ano Hi o Shiru Mono wa Saiwai Dearu
- Cross Over
- Daihyoubito
- ES (Eternal Sabbath)
- Free Collars Kingdom
- Gacha Gacha
- Genshiken
- Higanjima
- Jigoro Jigorou
- Jump Man
- Kagetora
- Kyō no Go no Ni
- Life
- Little Buster Q
- Little Forest
- Love Roma
- Mamotte! Lollipop
- Megaten All-Stars Devils Arc
- Mermaid Melody Pichi Pichi Pitch
- Monsters, Inc.
- Mr. Driller
- Murikuri
- My Heavenly Hockey Club
- Otogi no Machi no Rena
- Pastel
- Pumpkin Scissors
- Puppet Revolution
- Remote
- Rose Hip Rose
- Sakura Wars
- Samus and Joey
- School Rumble
- Shin Megami Tensei: Devil Children Light & Dark
- Shin Daa! Daa! Daa!
- Ultra Ninpocho Teru

=== 2003 ===
- Ahiru no Sora
- Alive: The Final Evolution
- Ashita no Nadja
- Avant-Garde Yumeko
- Basilisk
- Big Windup!
- Capeta
- Chanbara
- Chouseishin Gransazer
- Confidential Confessions: Deai
- Crush Gear Nitro
- Densetsu no Head Shou
- Dr. Mario-kun
- Dragon Zakura
- Gold Rush!
- Ground Defense Force! Mao-chan
- Guilty Gear Xtra
- Heat Guy J
- Historié
- IS Otoko Demo Onna Demo Nai Sei
- IWGP - Denshi no Hoshi
- Joshidaisei Kateikyoushi Hamanaka Ai
- Kamichama Karin
- Magician Tantei A
- Majokko Tsukune-chan
- Me and the Devil Blues
- Medarot G
- Metroid
- Mister Ajikko II
- Mobile Suit Gundam SEED
- Negima! Magister Negi Magi
- Popotan
- Q-Ko-chan
- Shin Megami Tensei: D-Children: Light & Dark
- Slut Girl +α
- Taiko no Tatsujin
- Tokko
- Tokyo Mew Mew à la Mode
- Tsubasa: Reservoir Chronicle
- Walkin' Butterfly
- Wild Base Ballers
- Wolf's Rain
- xxxHolic

=== 2004 ===
- Blame! Academy
- Boys Esté
- Cherry Juice
- Chi's Sweet Home
- Drops of God
- Drowning Love
- Dynamic Heroes
- Food Hunter Futaraiden
- Futari wa Pretty Cure
- GeGeGe no Kitaro R: A Thousand Yokai Tale
- Gunsmith Cats Burst
- Haou no Ken
- Haruka Seventeen
- Hataraki Man
- Kami no Shizuku
- Kitchen Princess
- Kurau Phantom Memory
- Le Portrait de Petit Cossette
- Love Attack!
- Kouya ni Kemono Doukokusu
- Mazinger Angels
- Minami-ke
- Mobile Suit Gundam SEED Destiny
- Mou, Shimasen kara
- Moyasimon: Tales of Agriculture
- Net Sphere Engineer
- Out Law
- Peach Girl: Sae's Story
- Pixie Pop
- Saiko Dokutā Kaikyōsuke
- Saru Lock
- SD Gundam Force
- Senpai to Kanojo
- Shamo
- Shion no Ō
- Sōryūden
- Spider-Man J
- Sugar Sugar Rune
- Suzuka
- Sweet Poolside
- Tim Burton's The Nightmare Before Christmas
- Tobaku Datenroku Kaiji
- Undercurrent
- Voices of a Distant Star
- Witchblade Takeru
- Yakushiji Ryōko no Kaiki Jikenbo
- Yugo the Negotiator

=== 2005 ===
- 090 - Eko to Issho.
- 8 Man Infinity
- Bokura no Sengoku Hakkyuuden
- C.M.B.
- Cesare
- Cherry Nights
- Cyborg Kuro-chan: Extra Battle
- Deltora Quest
- Devil Ecstasy
- Devilman Mokushiroku: Strange days
- Dragon Eye
- Full Spec
- Futari wa PreCure Max Heart
- Gankutsuou: The Count of Monte Cristo
- Haridama Magic Cram School
- Hell Girl
- Hyouge Mono
- Idaten Jump
- Junji Ito's Cat Diary: Yon & Mu'
- Kenka Shōbai
- Kenkō Zenrakei Suieibu Umishō
- Kilala Princess
- Kissxsis
- Koma Koma
- Kurau Phantom Memory
- Le Chevalier D'Eon
- Metroid Prime 2: Echoes
- Metroid Prime Episode of Aether
- Ninja Girls
- Over Drive
- Panic × Panic
- The Place Promised in Our Early Days
- Princess Resurrection
- Sayonara, Zetsubou-Sensei
- Sakura Wars: Show Theater
- Shinjuku Swan
- Shugo Chara!
- Sora no Manimani
- Sumire 17-sai!!
- Sweet Valerian
- Toto!: The Wonderful Adventure
- Train Man: A Shōjo Manga
- Vinland Saga
- The Yagyu Ninja Scrolls

=== 2006 ===
- Ace of Diamond
- Aishiteru: Kaiyō
- Amefurashi
- Angel's Frypan
- Aventura
- B.B.D Big Bad Daddy
- Bakeneko Anzu-chan
- Boku no Shiawase
- Crack!!
- Companion
- Demon Prince Enma
- Do Suru!? Paradise
- Fairy Tail
- Fantasium
- Fantastic Detective Labyrinth
- Fashion Leader Imai Shoutarou
- Flunk Punk Rumble
- Futari wa Pretty Cure Splash Star
- Gentle-san
- Goblin
- Goki-chan
- Gon-chan
- Gun Princess ~Sincerely Night~
- Hammer Session!
- Hen Semi
- Hotaruna Mystic
- Idol no Akahon
- Joppare Shun!
- The Knight in the Area
- Kujibiki Unbalance
- Mai's Room
- Minima!
- Modotte! Mamotte! Lollipop!
- Mobile Suit Gundam Alive
- Monster Soul
- Mysterious Girlfriend X
- Negima!?
- Night Head Genesis
- Ojamajin Yamada-kun!!
- Okko's Inn
- Phoenix Wright: Ace Attorney
- Psycho Busters
- Respect Gundam
- Roboo!
- Saint Young Men
- SD Gundam Musha Banchō Fūunroku
- Shinyaku "Kyojin no Hoshi": Hanagata
- Smash!
- Sumire 16 sai!!
- Mimia Hime
- Tekken Chinmi Legends
- Tokyo Alice
- Totsugeki Chicken!
- Umi no Tairiku NOA PLUS+
- Winning Ticket
- Yozakura Quartet

=== 2007 ===
- Altair: A Record of Battles
- Angel Bank: Dragon Zakura Gaiden
- Baby Steps
- Bloody Monday
- Chihayafuru
- Four-Eyed Prince
- GeGeGe no Kitaro: A Thousand Yokai Tales
- Giant Killing
- Gregory Horror Show
- Hell Girl: Enma Ai Selection, Super Scary Story
- Heroic Age
- I Am Here!
- Kabu no Isaki
- Kamichama Karin Chu
- Kotetsuden
- Oh! Edo Rocket
- Papillon
- Paprika: The Dream-Child
- Ryūrōden: Chugen Ryōran-hen
- Satanikus Enma Kerberos
- SD Gundam The Three Kingdoms
- Seitokai Yakuindomo
- Sky Girls
- Space Brothers
- Tobaku Haōden Zero
- Tonari no 801-chan: Fujoshiteki Kōkō Seikatsu
- What Did You Eat Yesterday?
- Yes! PreCure 5
- Yondemasuyo, Azazel-san

=== 2008 ===
- Aoi-sama ga Ikasete Ageru
- Apocrypha Getter Robot Dash
- Ayakashi
- Billy Bat
- Blame!2
- Blazer Drive
- Buster Keel!
- Cage of Eden
- Cinema-kun
- Code:Breaker
- Coppelion
- Edogawa George
- Emma
- Gyaruo the Bakutan!
- Himeanōru
- Holy Talker
- Honto ni Atta! Reibai Sensei
- The iDOLM@STER Break!
- Imasugu Click!
- Junjou Karen na Oretachi da!
- Kimitaka no Ateru!
- Lancelot Full Throttle
- Love's Reach
- Kikai Shōnen Megaboy
- Kitsune no Yomeiri
- Kurōbi! Hayata
- MAGiCO
- Majimagumi Hunter Mikuni Shin no Karyūdo Seikatsu
- Magatsuhi.com
- Maria the Virgin Witch
- Meitantei Pashiri-kun!
- Monster Hunter Orage
- Moteki
- Mukōgawa no Masaka
- My Little Monster
- Octave
- Otouto Catcher Ore Pitcher De!
- Out Code: Chōjō Hanzai Tokumu Sōsakan
- Princess Jellyfish
- Real Drive
- Say I Love You
- School Rumble Z
- Shugo Chara-chan!
- Teppu
- A Town Where You Live
- Tytania
- unCassandra
- Yes PreCure 5 GoGo!
- Zettai Hakase Kolisch

=== 2009 ===
- A-bout!
- Ace Attorney Investigations: Miles Edgeworth
- Akatsuki
- All Esper Dayo!
- Animal Land
- Arisa
- Attack on Titan
- Bloody Monday Season2 ~Pandora no Hako~
- Bushido Sixteen
- Brass Boy!
- Dear Boys: Act 3
- Double-J
- Gamaran
- GE – Good Ending
- GTO: 14 Days in Shonan
- F Final
- The Flowers of Evil
- Fresh Pretty Cure!
- Genshiken: Second Season
- Ghost in the Shell: S.A.C. - Tachikomatic
- Ghost in the Shell: Stand Alone Complex
- Joshiraku
- Kaitan
- Kaze to Kaminari
- Shin Kamen Rider Spirits
- Knights of Sidonia
- Kokkoku: Moment by Moment
- L♥DK
- Limit
- Mardock Scramble
- Mashiro no Oto
- Missions of Love
- Muromi-san
- New Hell Girl
- Nodame Cantable: Encore Opera Chapter
- Nuts To Make You An Adult Two
- Ōkami Kakushi: Metsushi no Shō
- Peepo Choo
- Sankarea: Undying Love
- Shikabane 13-gō
- Spray King
- Suiiki
- Tobaku Datenroku Kaiji: Kazuya-hen
- Tsumuji VS.
- Wangan Midnight: C1 Runner

== 2010s ==
=== 2010 ===
- 5 Centimeters per Second
- Aishiteru ~Kizuna~
- AKB49: Ren'ai Kinshi Jōrei
- Black Out
- Bun Bun Bee
- Demon From Afar
- Descending Stories: Showa Genroku Rakugo Shinju
- Furimukuna Kimi wa
- Gin no Spoon
- Gurazeni
- Hammer Session!
- He's My Only Vampire
- Hell Girl R
- Higanjima: Saigo no 47 Nichikan
- House of the Sun
- Jirashin Diablo
- Kamikamikaeshi
- Liar × Liar
- LovePlus Rinko Days
- Manga Dogs
- Montage
- Negiho
- Noragami
- Oniwaka to Ushiwaka: Edge of the World
- PTSD Radio
- Sabagebu!
- Shugo Chara! Encore!
- Shura no Mon: Daini Mon
- Shura no Mon: Fudekage
- Tsukuroi Tatsu Hito
- Wandering Island
- Witchcraft Works

=== 2011 ===
- Again!!
- Apple Children of Aeon
- Appleseed XIII
- As the Gods Will
- Bakudan! - Bakumatsu Danshi
- Battle Angel Alita: Last Order
- Bloody Monday Final Season
- Break of Dawn
- Die Wergelder
- Dragon Collection: Ryū o Suberu Mono
- Dream Fossil
- Elegant Yokai Apartment Life
- Fort of Apocalypse
- God Eater: Kyūseishu no Kikan
- Green Blood
- Hana-kun to Koisuru Watashi
- Hitsuji no Ki
- Hozuki's Coolheadedness
- If Her Flag Breaks
- Imori 201
- Kira-kun Today
- Kyō no Yuiko-san
- Lovely Muco
- Maga-Tsuki
- My Wife is Wagatsuma-san
- No. 6
- Phi Brain: Saigo no Puzzle
- The Prince in His Dark Days
- Prison School
- Psychometrer
- Real Girl
- Sanzoku Diary
- She, Her Camera, and Her Seasons
- Sherlock Bones
- Star Children
- Suite PreCure
- Tobaku Haōden Zero: Gyanki-hen
- Town Doctor Jumbo!!
- Welcome to the Ballroom
- When We're in Love
- Wild Cherry Nights
- Your Lie in April
- Yuki ni Tsubasa
- Zeus no Tane

=== 2012 ===
- 10 Dance
- Aho-Girl
- Ai ni Iku yo
- Ajin: Demi-Human
- Akumu no Sumu Ie: Ghost Hunt
- All Out!!
- Ani-Imo
- Attack on Titan: Junior High
- Cherry Nights R
- Chotto Morimashita
- Devil Survivor
- Flying Witch
- From the New World
- The Full-Time Wife Escapist
- GodHand Teru: Kamigami no Souheki
- GT-R
- He's Expecting
- Ixion Saga
- K: Memory of Red
- K: Stray Dog Story
- Knight of the Ice
- Kōnodori
- Kyō no Kira-kun
- Land of the Lustrous
- Lesson of the Evil
- Let's Dance a Waltz
- Marine Corps Yumi
- My Boy in Blue
- Naqua-Den
- Nigeru wa Haji da ga Yaku ni Tatsu
- Otokodama Rock
- Outbreak Company
- P and JK
- Rakugomon
- The Seven Deadly Sins
- Smile PreCure!
- Stella Women’s Academy, High School Division Class C³
- Tsubasa World Chronicle: Nirai Kanai-hen
- Tsuredure Children
- The Wizard and His Fairy
- Yamada-kun and the Seven Witches
- Zipang: Shinsō Kairyū

=== 2013 ===
- 4-koma Shīkyūbu
- A Silent Voice
- A-bout!! - Asagiri Daikatsuyaku Hen
- Acma: Game
- As the Gods Will: The Second Series
- Attack on Titan: Before the Fall
- Attack on Titan: No Regrets
- Bayonetta: Bloody Fate
- Beauty Bunny
- Charon
- Clockwork Planet
- Complex Age
- Days
- Devils' Line
- DokiDoki! PreCure
- Ganbare Goemon - Yukihime Kyuushutsu Emaki
- The Garden of Words
- Ghost in the Shell: Arise
- The Gods Lie
- Hanebado!
- Hangyaku no Kage Tsukai
- Hello!!
- The Heroic Legend of Arslan
- Ichi-F
- K: Days of Blue
- Kakafukaka
- Kasane
- Kigurumi Guardians
- Kiss Him, Not Me
- Kyou no Jovolley
- Lastman
- Macmillan no Joshi Yakyuubu
- Museum
- Peach Mermaid
- Queen Bee!
- Rivnes
- Rose Guns Days Fukushū wa Ōgon no Kaori
- Seisen Cerberus: Mō Hitori no Eiyū
- Sensei's Pious Lie
- Shota no Sushi 2: World Stage
- Silent Möbius QD
- Soredemo Boku wa Kimi ga Suki
- Spoof on Titan
- Sweetness and Lightning
- Takara no Zen
- Takato Case Files
- That Blue Summer
- Tobaku Datenroku Kaiji: One Poker-hen
- Tokkō Jimuin Minowa
- UQ Holder!
- The Walls Between Us
- YZQ ✕ DRRR!!
- xxxHolic: Rei

=== 2014 ===
- 3×3 Eyes: Genjū no Mori no Sōnansha
- A Man Called Pirate
- Abe no Iru Machi
- Ai Tenchi Muyo!
- Alice in Murderland
- Battle Angel Alita: Mars Chronicle
- Baymax
- Chain Chronicle
- Code Black: Lelouch of the Shred Guitar
- Corp Shitsurakuen
- Deathtopia
- Debusen
- Defying Kurosaki-kun
- Dolly Kill Kill
- Domestic Girlfriend
- The Fable
- Fairy Girls
- Fairy Tail Blue Mistral
- Fairy Tail Zero
- Fragile
- Frau Faust
- Grand Blue
- GTO: Paradise Lost
- Gurazeni: Tokyo Dome-hen
- Fuuka
- HappinessCharge PreCure!
- Harem Marriage
- Higanjima 48 Nichigo…
- Holiday Love
- How Not to Summon a Demon Lord
- Interviews with Monster Girls
- Inuyashiki
- Junketsu no Maria Exhibition
- Kaitō Ruban
- Kimi wo Mawashitai
- Komori-chan wa Yaruki wo Dase
- Love and Lies
- Mikami-sensei's Way of Love
- My Best (♀) Butler
- Ninja Slayer Kills
- Paradise Residence
- Perfect World
- Professional Henshuusha no Yuugi
- Pumpkin Scissors: Power Snips
- Raised by the Demon Kings!
- Real Account
- Rengoku no Karma
- Rupodama!
- Mayoe! The Seven Deadly Sins Academy!
- Shinjuku DxD
- Shinkai Tsuzuri no Dokkairoku
- Sono 'Okodawari', Ore ni mo Kure yo!
- Starving Anonymous
- Tenkei no Arimaria
- That Wolf-Boy Is Mine!
- To the Abandoned Sacred Beasts
- Tokyo Tarareba Girls
- Tsuredure Children
- Unlimited Fafnir
- Waiting for Spring
- Wake Up, Sleeping Beauty
- Watashi no Muchi na Watashi no Michi
- Wave, Listen to Me!
- World's End and Apricot Jam

=== 2015 ===
- Ace of Diamond Act II
- The Angel, the Devil, and Me
- Ao-chan Can't Study!
- Aoba-kun's Confessions
- Attack on Titan: Lost Girls
- Back Street Girls
- Beware the Kamiki Brothers!
- Black-Box
- Black Panther and Sweet 16
- Boarding School Juliet
- Can You Just Die, My Darling?
- Cells at Work!
- Cyborg 009 VS Devilman
- Daigo Tokusou
- Dekoboko Animation
- Desert Eagle
- Designs
- Fire Force
- Gleipnir
- Go! Princess PreCure
- Golden Gold
- Golosseum
- Happiness
- High-Rise Invasion
- I'm in Love and It's the End of the World
- Imperfect Girl
- In/Spectre
- Is Kichijoji the Only Place to Live?
- K: Dream of Green
- Kakushigoto: My Dad's Secret Ambition
- A Kiss, for Real
- Kiss Me at the Stroke of Midnight
- Lovesick Ellie
- Marriage ~The Drops of God Final Arc~
- Masukomi
- Muteki no Hito
- Mr. Tonegawa: Middle Management Blues
- My Brother the Shut-In
- My Sweet Girl
- Occultic;Nine
- Our Precious Conversations
- Peach Boy Riverside
- Persona Q: Shadow of the Labyrinth – Side: P3
- Persona Q: Shadow of the Labyrinth – Side: P4
- Pitch-Black Ten
- The Prince's Black Poison
- The Prince's Romance Gambit
- Q.E.D. iff
- The Seven Deadly Sins Production
- Shigatsu wa Kimi no Uso: Coda
- Shoujo Fujuubun
- A Springtime with Ninjas
- That Time I Got Reincarnated as a Slime
- Tomo-chan Is a Girl!
- Watari-kun's ****** Is About to Collapse

=== 2016 ===
- 1-nichi Gaishutsuroku Hanchō
- 3×3 Eyes: Kiseki no Yami no Keiyakusha
- 6-senchii no Kizuna
- 8-gatsu Outlaw
- 1122: For a Happy Marriage
- Ayanashi
- Battle Angel Alita
- Can I Kiss You Every Day?
- Cardcaptor Sakura: Clear Card
- Crocodile Baron
- Danganronpa Gaiden: Killer Killer
- Dear Boys: Over Time
- Dr. Prisoner
- Drifting Dragons
- Farewell, My Dear Cramer
- Gang King
- Hoshino, Me wo Tsubutte
- I Want to Hold Aono-kun so Badly I Could Die
- I'll Win You Over, Sempai!
- I'm Standing on a Million Lives
- The Idolmaster Cinderella Girls U149
- Intertwining Lives
- Karate Heat
- Keeping His Whims in Check
- Key Ring Lock
- Kono Ken ga Tsuki wo Kiru
- Love in Focus
- Love Massage: Melting Beauty Treatment
- Magical Sempai
- Manaria Friends
- Momo's Iron Will
- My Boyfriend in Orange
- My Darling, the Company President
- My Wonderful World
- Nioh: The Golden Samurai
- O Maidens in Your Savage Season
- Ogami-san Can't Keep It In
- ORIGIN
- Our Love Doesn't Need a Happy Ending
- Peach Girl Next
- Pretty Boy Detective Club
- Rage of Bahamut
- Ryūrōden: Ouha Rikkoku-hen
- Seasoned Connections
- Senryu Girl
- Seton Academy: Join the Pack!
- The Seven Deadly Sins: King's Road to Manga
- She and Her Cat
- Shutoko SPL - Ginkai no Speedster
- Something's Wrong With Us
- Stray Bullet Baby
- Those Summer Days
- Thunderbolt Fantasy
- To Write Your Words
- To Your Eternity
- Toppu GP
- Trickster
- Undead Girl Murder Farce
- Until Your Bones Rot
- The Witch and the Beast
- Witch Hat Atelier
- Witchy PreCure!
- You Got Me, Sempai!
- Yuzu the Pet Vet

=== 2017 ===
- A.I.C.O. -Incarnation-
- Alicia's Diet Quest
- And Yet, You Are So Sweet
- Another Side:Earthbound
- Aposimz
- Are You Lost?
- Asahi-sempai's Favorite
- Back When You Called Us Devils
- Bacteria at Work
- Blissful Land
- Blue Period
- Burn the House Down
- Chaos;Child: Children's Collapse
- Chihayafuru: Chuugakusei-hen
- Chūka Ichiban! Kiwami
- A Condition Called Love
- Crusher Joe Rebirth
- Don't Toy With Me, Miss Nagatoro
- The Dorm of Love and Secrets
- Dr. Ramune: Mysterious Disease Specialist
- Emma Dreams of Stars
- Ex-Enthusiasts: MotoKare Mania
- Fate/Grand Order -turas realta-
- The Golden Sheep
- Good Dog, Cerberus!
- Goodbye! I'm Being Reincarnated!
- The Great Cleric
- Guilty
- Hella Chill Monsters
- High&Low: G-Sword
- I Fell in Love After School
- The Idolmaster Cinderella Girls After20
- Issak
- Kessen no Kuon
- Kino's Journey: The Beautiful World
- Kirakira PreCure a la Mode
- The Knight Cartoonist and Her Orc Editor
- The Lady's Servant
- Living-Room Matsunaga-san
- Magus of the Library
- Maid in Honey
- Messiah -CODE EDGE-
- MF Ghost
- Mobile Suit Gundam: Twilight AXIS
- My Boss's Kitten
- My Home Hero
- My Pink Is Overflowing
- Our Fake Marriage
- The Ouka Ninja Scrolls
- Practice Makes Perfect
- Princess Resurrection Nightmare
- The Quintessential Quintuplets
- Ran the Peerless Beauty
- Ranker's High
- Red Riding Hood's Wolf Apprentice
- Rent-A-Girlfriend
- Saint Cecilia and Pastor Lawrence
- Satoko and Nada
- Saving 80,000 Gold in Another World for My Retirement
- Sensei, Sukidesu
- Seraph of the End: Guren Ichinose: Catastrophe at Sixteen
- The Seven Deadly Sins: Seven Days
- even Shakespeares: Non Sanz Droict
- Shima Kōsaku no Jiken-bo
- Smile Down the Runway
- The Story of Our Unlikely Love
- Such a Treacherous Piano Sonata
- Sweet Sweet Revenge
- Tobaku Datenroku Kaiji: 24 Oku Dasshutsu-hen
- Tokyo Revengers
- Tokyo Tarareba Girls Extra Edition: Tarare Bar
- Tsue Petit Mahou Tsukai ♀ no Bouken no Sho
- Uma Musume Pretty Derby
- We Must Never Fall in Love!
- Why the Hell are You Here, Teacher!?
- Will It Be the World or Her?
- With a Dog AND a Cat, Every Day is Fun
- The Writer and His Housekeeper
- Yakuza Fiancé
- Yomawari Neko

=== 2018 ===
- Abe-kun's Got Me Now!
- Atsumori-kun's Bride to Be
- Bakemonogatari
- Blade Girl
- Blue Lock
- Boss Bride Days
- Cells at Work! Code Black
- Cells that Don't Work
- Changes of the Heart
- Edens Zero
- Fairy Tail: 100 Years Quest
- Four Kisses, In Secret
- Gamaran: Shura
- A Girl & Her Guard Dog
- Gurazeni: Pa League-hen
- Heavenly Delusion
- Heroine for Hire
- The Hidden Dungeon Only I Can Enter
- Hitman
- The Honey-blood Beauty & Her Vampire
- How to Treat a Lady Knight Right
- Hugtto! PreCure
- The Invincible Reincarnated Ponkotsu
- Joy
- Jūshinki no Pandora 0
- The King of Fighters: A New Beginning
- Kiss and Cry
- Let's Kiss in Secret Tomorrow
- MabuSasa
- The Masterful Cat Is Depressed Again Today
- Megalobox
- Men's Life: Her Secret Life in The Boys' Dormitory
- My Boy
- My Dearest Self with Malice Aforethought
- My Roomie Is a Dino
- My Unique Skill Makes Me OP Even at Level 1
- A Nico-Colored Canvas
- Orient
- Pandora Men's Dining
- Police in a Pod
- Princess Connect! Re:Dive
- Remake Our Life!
- Run Away With Me, Girl
- Sachi's Monstrous Appetite
- Searching for My Perfect Brother
- A Serenade for Pretend Lovers
- Shaman King: Red Crimson
- Shaman King: The Super Star
- Skip and Loafer
- Sweat and Soap
- TenPuru
- The Slime Diaries: That Time I Got Reincarnated as a Slime
- That Time I Got Reincarnated (Again!) as a Workaholic Slime
- That's My Atypical Girl
- This Man: Sono Kao wo Mita Mono ni wa Shi wo
- Tokyo Tarareba Girls Returns
- Twilight Out of Focus
- Vampire Dormitory
- What I Love About You
- When a Cat Faces West
- When We Shout for Love
- The Witches of Adamas
- With the Sheikh in His Harem
- Wonder Cat Kyuu-chan
- Yuria-sensei no Akai Ito
- Zombie Land Saga

=== 2019 ===
- Am I Actually the Strongest?
- Babylon
- Beauty and the Beast of Paradise Lost
- Blackguard
- Bootsleg
- Cells at Work! Friend
- Chihiro-kun Only Has Eyes for Me
- The Dawn of the Witch
- The Decagon House Murders
- Fairy Gone
- The Food Diary of Miss Maid
- The Ghost in the Shell: The Human Algorithm
- Hop Step Sing!
- How Do You Do, Koharu?
- Human Lost
- Hypnosis Mic: Division Rap Battle: Before the Battle: The Dirty Dawg
- Hypnosis Mic: Division Rap Battle: Side B.B. & M.T.C
- Hypnosis Mic: Division Rap Battle: Side F.P & M
- I Guess I Became the Mother of the Great Demon King's 10 Children
- Irresistible Mistakes
- Island in a Puddle
- The Lines that Define Me
- Love After World Domination
- Mashima HERO'S
- Mr. Bride
- My Master Has No Tail
- My Tentative Name
- Nina the Starry Bride
- Otherworldly Munchkin: Let's Speedrun the Dungeon with Only 1 HP!
- Piano Duo for the Left Hand
- Raging Loop
- Sen wa, Boku wo Egaku
- Shaman King
- Shaman King: Flowers
- Shaman King: Zero
- Shikimori's Not Just a Cutie
- A Sign of Affection
- Sketchy
- The Springtime of My Life Began with You
- Star Twinkle PreCure
- Star⮂Crossed!!
- Stellar Witch LIP☆S
- That Time I Got Reincarnated as a Slime: Trinity in Tempest
- Those Not-So-Sweet Boys
- Tokyo Tarareba Girls Season 2
- Wandance
- Weathering with You
- When Will Ayumu Make His Move?
- Witch Hat Atelier Kitchen
- Ya Boy Kongming!
- Yamaguchi-kun Isn't So Bad

== 2020s ==
=== 2020 ===
- As a Reincarnated Aristocrat, I'll Use My Appraisal Skill to Rise in the World
- Chiikawa
- A Couple of Cuckoos
- The Darwin Incident
- Hypnosis Mic -Division Rap Battle- side D.H & B.A.T
- I Was Reincarnated as the 7th Prince so I Can Take My Time Perfecting My Magical Ability
- The Iceblade Sorcerer Shall Rule the World
- It's Just Not My Night
- Medalist
- My Life as Inukai-san's Dog
- Platelets at Work
- Quality Assurance in Another World
- Shaman King: Marcos
- Tawawa on Monday
- Tono & Stitch

=== 2021 ===
- The Fragrant Flower Blooms With Dignity
- Ishura
- Koigakubo-kun Stole My First Time
- My Girlfriend's Child
- My Lovesick Life as a '90s Otaku
- Sing a Bit of Harmony
- Tengu no Daidokoro
- Tesla Note
- Wind Breaker
- Yano-kun no Futsū no Hibi

=== 2022 ===
- A Kingdom of Quartz
- Chaos Game
- Suzume

=== 2023 ===
- Kakuriyo: Bed and Breakfast for Spirits
- When the Chameleon Flowers Bloom

=== 2024 ===
- Omori

=== 2025 ===
- Dig It
- Paris ni Saku Étoile

== Unsorted ==
- 0→1Rebirth
- Blue Scanner
- Chou Musha Gundam Bushin Kirahagane
- Chou Musha Gundam Musha Senki Hikari no Hengen Hen
- Chou Musha Gundam Tensei Shichinin Shuu
- Chou Musha Gundam Touba Daishougun
- Company Girl
- Doonto! Dragon Kid!
- éX-Driver
- Fortune Dogs
- Goldfish Warning! Returns
- Herohero-kun
- Keitai Denjū Telefang
- Keitai Denjū Telefang 2
- Kikai Wakusei Garakutania
- Kōryū Densetsu Villgust
- Netsuretsu-teki How to Girl
- Ochakumi Enjerusu
- Plamo Kyoshiro Musha Gundam
- Q Robo Transformers
- SD Gundam Force Emaki Musharetsuden
- Shake Hip
- Shi to Kanojo to Boku Meguru
- Shi to Kanojo to Boku Yukari
- Shin Iyahaya-kun
- Shin Musha Gundam Chou Kidou Daishougun
- Shōkan-ō Rekusu
- Star of Happiness Haghal
- Tarpan
- To Heaven
- Transformers Galaxy Force
- Ultra Ninja Manual Flash
- Vampire Savior
- Vampire: Messenger of the End

== See also ==
- List of works published by Kodansha
- List of works published by Ichijinsha
