= Dragon Voice =

Japanese manga series

- First tankōbon volume cover, featuring Rin Amami
- Genre: Comedy-drama; Music
- Manga
- Written by: Yuriko Nishiyama
- Published by: Kodansha
- English publisher: NA: Tokyopop (former)
- Magazine: Weekly Shōnen Magazine
- Original run: January 17, 2001 – January 22, 2003
- Volumes: 11
- icon

Dragon Voice is a Japanese manga series written and illustrated by Yuriko Nishiyama. It was serialized in Kodansha's shōnen manga magazine Weekly Shōnen Magazine from January 2001 to January 2003, with its chapters collected in 11 tankōbon volumes. The manga was licensed in North America by Tokyopop; 10 volumes were released before their manga licensing contract with Kodansha had expired in 2009. The story centers on a Japanese pop-singing group called Beatmen and focuses on the life of Rin Amami, the unlikely fifth member of the group who was foretold as the bearer of a legendary unique singing vocal called "Dragon Voice".

== Story ==
14-year-old Rin Amami is a gifted street dancer. His dream was to become a singer like his mother, but he has a harsh and unpleasant-sounding voice. However, his chance encounter with the idol singing group Beatmen opens the path to the music industry to him. The head of the small idol agency called Redshoes (who manages the Beatmen) is certain that Rin's voice is the legendary "Dragon Voice".

== Characters ==
Rin Amami
Rin is a talented and smart-mouthed street dancer. He can remember and copy any dance routine just by watching them once. He started out as a teenager who dislikes boybands. Ironically, Rin's hidden desire is to be a singer like his late mother, but decided to give up his dreams because of his bad voice, which was often referred by his schoolmates to "resemble the voice of a bullfrog".
Shino
Shino is the kind and responsible leader of the pop-singing group. Very professional, he often pushes himself hard at work even though he has an asthmatic condition. He is the most enthusiastic and optimistic member of the group. He acts as the "glue that sticks the Beatmen together".
Yuhgo Etoh
Yuhgo is the often quiet member of The Beatmen. He's been involved in the music industry since he was very young. He occasionally writes lyrics, and is the most technologically adept member of the group. His straight attitude sometimes make people think of him as being arrogant, though it is mostly because of his difficulty in expressing his own feelings.
Goh Iwaki
Goh is the "wild" member of the group. He was brought up in a family of kabuki actors and was supposed to succeed the family occupation, but rebelled in order to perform his own kind of music with the Beatmen. He has a younger brother who carries on his family's kabuki heritage in his place.
Toshio Tamura
Toshi is the delicate and flamboyant member of the group. He is a bit of a coward. Hailing from a wealthy family, he was trained as a classical pianist, but decided to throw his lot in with the Beatmen.

== Publication ==
Written and illustrated by Yuriko Nishiyama, Dragon Voice was serialized in Kodansha's shōnen manga magazine Weekly Shōnen Magazine from January 17, 2001, to January 22, 2003. Kodansha collected its chapters in eight tankōbon volumes, released from May 17, 2001, to March 17, 2003.

In North America, the manga was licensed for English release by Tokyopop. Ten volumes were released from October 12, 2004, to February 12, 2008; the 11th and final volume was first announced to be delayed from its July 2008 release, before Tokyopop confirmed in August 2009 that their manga licensing contracts with Kodansha had expired.

== See also ==
- Harlem Beat, another manga series by the same author
