= Kimi ga Kemono ni Naru Mae ni =

Japanese manga series

- First tankōbon volume cover

君が獣になる前に
- Genre: Noir, suspense
- Manga
- Written by: Takashi Sano
- Published by: Kodansha
- Imprint: Young Magazine KC
- Magazine: Weekly Young Magazine
- Original run: October 4, 2021 – March 13, 2023
- Volumes: 8
- Television drama
- Directed by: Mari Asato; Kyoya Kakuda; Taku Matsumoto
- Written by: Mari Asato; Masashi Shimizu; Keita Tome
- Music by: Teje; Senri Tai
- Original network: TV Tokyo
- Original run: April 6, 2024 – June 22, 2024
- Episodes: 12

Kimi ga Kemono ni Naru Mae ni (君が獣になる前に; lit. 'Before You Turn Into a Beast') is a Japanese manga series written and illustrated by Takashi Sano. It was serialized in Kodansha's seinen manga magazine Weekly Young Magazine from October 2021 to March 2023, with its chapters collected in eight tankōbon volumes. A television drama adaptation aired from April to June 2024.

== Media ==
=== Manga ===
Written and illustrated by Takashi Sano, Kimi ga Kemono ni Naru Mae ni was serialized in Kodansha's seinen manga magazine Weekly Young Magazine from October 4, 2021, to March 13, 2023. Kodansha collected its chapters in eight tankōbon volumes, released from January 6, 2022, to May 8, 2023.

==== Volumes ====
No.	Release date	ISBN
1	January 6, 2022	978-4-06-526470-6
2	April 6, 2022	978-4-06-527449-1
3	June 6, 2022	978-4-06-528105-5
4	August 5, 2022	978-4-06-528801-6
5	October 6, 2022	978-4-06-529459-8
6	January 6, 2023	978-4-06-530399-3
7	March 6, 2023	978-4-06-531048-9
8	May 8, 2023	978-4-06-531838-6

=== Drama ===
In February 2024, it was announced that the manga would receive a television drama adaptation that aired on TV Tokyo from April 6 to June 22 of the same year. (Note: TV Tokyo listed the premiere date on April 5 at 24:12, which is effectively April 6 at 0:12 a.m. JST.)

== See also ==
- Back When You Called Us Devils, another manga series by the same author
