= That's My Atypical Girl =

Japanese manga series

- First tankōbon volume cover, featuring Megumi Saito (left) and Taku Yokoi (right)

アスペル・カノジョ (Asuperu Kanojo)
- Genre: Romance; Slice of life
- Manga
- Written by: Sohachi Hagimoto
- Illustrated by: Renji Morita
- Published by: Kodansha
- English publisher: NA: Kodansha USA (digital)
- Magazine: Comic Days
- Original run: March 6, 2018 – January 26, 2021
- Volumes: 12
- icon

That's My Atypical Girl (Japanese: アスペル・カノジョ, Hepburn: Asuperu Kanojo; "Asper Girlfriend") is a Japanese web manga series written by Sohachi Hagimoto and illustrated by Renji Morita. It was serialized on Kodansha's digital manga platform Comic Days from March 2018 to January 2021, with its chapters collected in twelve tankōbon volumes.

== Plot ==
Taku Yokoi is a struggling manga artist who delivers newspapers at night and draws erotic doujinshi to make ends meet. One day, a young woman from Tottori named Megumi Saito suddenly arrives at his apartment complex to meet him as she is a fan of his original work, Opening Up. Yokoi soon realizes that Saito's behavior and personality is different compared to most people. Once she moves in, the two must learn how to rely on and support each other.

== Publication ==
Written by Sohachi Hagimoto and illustrated by Renji Morita, That's My Atypical Girl was serialized on Kodansha's digital manga platform Comic Days from March 6, 2018, to January 26, 2021. Kodansha collected its chapters in twelve tankōbon volumes, released from July 11, 2018, to May 12, 2021.

In North America, the manga has been licensed for English digital release by Kodansha USA.

=== Volumes ===
No.	Original release date	Original ISBN	English release date	English ISBN
1	July 11, 2018	978-4-06-512034-7	July 6, 2021	978-1-63699-166-5
1. "Visit" (訪問, Hōmon); 2. "Sleepover" (宿泊, Shukuhaku); 3. "Thok" (どっ, Do); 4. "Somebody Like Me" (私みたいなのが, Watashi Mitai na no ga); 5. "Ask Yokoi" (横井に聞け, Yokoi ni Kike); 6. "Ka-Wham" (ゴシャッ, Gosha); 7. "Flashback" (フラッシュバック, Furasshu Bakku); 8. "I'm Sorry" (ごめんなさい, Gomen Nasai)
2	November 14, 2018	978-4-06-513565-5	September 28, 2021	978-1-63699-248-8
9. "A Regular Person" (普通の人, Futsū no Hito); 10. "Wouldn't That Pain You?" (胸が痛くないんですか, Mune ga Itaku Nai n desu ka); 11. "Ten Seconds" (10秒, Jū Byō); 12. "I Think I See You" (見えてるつもり, Mieteru Tsumori); 13. "Saito-san's Observation Diary" (斉藤さん観察日記, Saitō-san Kansatsu Nikki); 14. "Sex" (セックス, Sekkusu); 15. "Let Me On Your Side" (仲間に入れて, Nakama ni Irete); 16. "Balcony Picture" (ベランダ写真, Beranda Shashin)
3	March 13, 2019	978-4-06-514809-9	December 28, 2021	978-1-63699-309-6
17. "Melancholy Day (Pt. 1)" (憂鬱の日（前編）, Yūutsu no Hi (Zenpen)); 18. "Melancholy Day (Pt. 2)" (憂鬱の日（後編）, Yūutsu no Hi (Kōhen)); 19. "Mutual Understanding" (相互理解, Sōgo Rikai); 20. "Hellish Season" (地獄の季節, Jigoku no Kisetsu); 21. "To Tokyo (Pt. 1)" (東京へ（前編）, Tōkyō e (Zenpen)); 22. "To Tokyo (Pt. 2)" (東京へ（後編）, Tōkyō e (Kōhen)); 23. "Shall We Buy It?" (買っちまいましょう, Katchimaimashou); 24. "Beyond Sleep" (眠りの先, Nemuri no Saki)
4	May 7, 2019	978-4-06-515200-3	March 22, 2022	978-1-63699-665-3
25. "120 Yen" (120円, Hyaku Ni-Jū En); 26. "Yokoi's Father" (横井の父, Yokoi no Chichi); 27. "She Didn't Believe Me (Pt. 1)" (信じてなかった（前編）, Shinjite Nakatta (Zenpen)); 28. "She Didn't Believe Me (Pt. 2)" (信じてなかった（後編）, Shinjite Nakatta (Kōhen)); 29. "Let's Make Memories" (思い出を作ろう, Omoide o Tsukurou); 30. "Yokoi-san's Observation Diary" (横井さん観察日記, Yokoi-san Kansatsu Nikki); 31. "One Step At a Time..." (一歩ずつ......, Ippo Zutsu......)
5	October 9, 2019	978-4-06-517295-7	June 28, 2022	978-1-68491-234-6
32. "The Kind of Face I Like" (好きな顔, Sukina Kao); 33. "Spider's Thread (Pt. 1)" (蜘蛛の糸（前編）, Kumo no Ito (Zenpen)); 34. "Spider's Thread (Pt. 2)" (蜘蛛の糸（後編）, Kumo no Ito (Kōhen)); 35. "24 Years Old" (24歳, Nijūyon Sai); 36. "Careless Words" (軽口, Karuguchi); 37. "Sea Turtle's Steps" (ウミガメの歩み, Umigame no Ayumi); 38. "Unknown Pain" (知らない痛さ, Shiranai Itasa); 39. "Shimizu Residence (Pt. 1)" (清水一家（前編）, Shimizu Ikka (Zenpen))
6	February 12, 2020	978-4-06-518480-6	September 27, 2022	978-1-68491-455-5
40. "Shimizu Residence (Pt. 2)" (清水一家（中編）, Shimizu Ikka (Chūhen)); 41. "Shimizu Residence (Pt. 3)" (清水一家（後編）, Shimizu Ikka (Kōhen)); 42. "All of You" (どいつもこいつも, Do Itsumo Koitsu mo); 43. "Winter Omen" (冬の予兆, Fuyu no Yochō); 44. "Equality" (対等, Taitō); 45. "Distrust of Reality" (現実不信, Genjitsu Fushin); 46. "You Really Want To?" (本当にしたい？, Hontō ni Shitai?); 47. "Room in Room" (Note: This chapter is stylized in all lowercase in the Japanese version.); 48. "One Who Sees" (見る人, Miru Hito)
7	May 13, 2020	978-4-06-519543-7	December 27, 2022	978-1-68491-602-3
49. "Horse and Dragon" (馬と竜, Uma to Ryū); 50. "Homo Sapiens" (ホモ・サピエンス, Homo Sapiensu); 51. "Yonago Snow (Pt. 1)" (米子の雪 その1, Yonago no Yuki Sono 1); 52. "Yonago Snow (Pt. 2)" (米子の雪 その2, Yonago no Yuki Sono 2); 53. "Yonago Snow (Pt. 3)" (米子の雪 その3, Yonago no Yuki Sono 3); 54. "Yonago Snow (Pt. 4)" (米子の雪 その4, Yonago no Yuki Sono 4); 55. "Yonago Snow (Pt. 5)" (米子の雪 その5, Yonago no Yuki Sono 5); 56. "Yonago Snow (Pt. 6)" (米子の雪 その6, Yonago no Yuki Sono 6); 57. "Yonago Snow (Pt. 7)" (米子の雪 その7, Yonago no Yuki Sono 7)
8	August 11, 2020	978-4-06-520201-2	March 28, 2023	978-1-68491-857-7
58. "Yonago Snow (Pt. 8)" (米子の雪 その8, Yonago no Yuki Sono 8); 59. "Yonago Snow (Pt. 9)" (米子の雪 その9, Yonago no Yuki Sono 9); 60. "Yonago Snow (Pt. 10)" (米子の雪 その10, Yonago no Yuki Sono 10); 61. "Yonago Snow (Pt. 11)" (米子の雪 その11, Yonago no Yuki Sono 11); 62. "Yonago Snow (Pt. 12)" (米子の雪 その12, Yonago no Yuki Sono 12); 63. "Yonago Snow (Pt. 13)" (米子の雪 その13, Yonago no Yuki Sono 13); 64. "Yonago Snow (Pt. 14)" (米子の雪 その14, Yonago no Yuki Sono 14); 65. "Yonago Snow (Pt. 15)" (米子の雪 その15, Yonago no Yuki Sono 15); 66. "Yonago Snow (Final)" (米子の雪 最終話, Yonago no Yuki Saishū Banashi)
9	November 11, 2020	978-4-06-521377-3	June 27, 2023	978-1-68491-975-8
67. "Mt. Starvation" (餓死山, Gashi Yama); 68. "Stress (Pt. 1)" (ストレス（前編）, Sutoresu (Zenpen)); 69. "Stress (Pt. 2)" (ストレス（中編）, Sutoresu (Chūhen)); 70. "Stress (Pt. 3)" (ストレス（後編）, Sutoresu (Kōhen)); 71. "Red Town (Pt. 1)" (赤い街（前編）, Akai Machi (Zenpen)); 72. "Red Town (Pt. 2)" (赤い街（後編）, Akai Machi (Kōhen)); 73. "Wounded Path Home" (傷だらけの帰路, Kizu Darake no Kiro); 74. "I Want You to Help Me" (助けてほしい, Tasukete Hoshī)
10	February 10, 2021	978-4-06-522298-0	September 26, 2023	979-8-88933-152-0
75. "Spring Changes" (変動の春, Hendō no Haru); 76. "Sex (Pt. 1)" (性（前編）, Sei (Zenpen)); 77. "Sex (Pt. 2)" (性（後編）, Sei (Kōhen)); 78. "Creeping Gaze (Pt. 1)" (這う目線（前編）, Hau Mesen (Zenpen)); 79. "Creeping Gaze (Pt. 2)" (這う目線（中編）, Hau Mesen (Chūhen)); 80. "Creeping Gaze (Pt. 3)" (這う目線（後編）, Hau Mesen (Kōhen)); 81. "Sigh of Relief" (安堵の吐息, Ando no Toiki); 82. "Circle and Peace" (輪と和, Wa to Wa)
11	April 14, 2021	978-4-06-522943-9	February 27, 2024	979-8-88933-296-1
83. "Changing Scene" (変わる状景, Kawaru Jōkei); 84. "Work Poisoning (Pt. 1)" (職毒（前編）, Shoku Doku (Zenpen)); 85. "Work Poisoning (Pt. 2)" (職毒（後編）, Shoku Doku (Kōhen)); 86. "Wedging In" (割り込み, Warikomi); 87. "Savanna" (サバンナ, Sabanna); 88. "Scars of the Rain (Pt. 1)" (雨の爪あと（前編）, Ame no Tsumeato (Zenpen)); 89. "Scars of the Rain (Pt. 2)" (雨の爪あと（後編）, Ame no Tsumeato (Kōhen)); 90. "Reports of a 20-Year-Old" (20歳の報告, Hatachi no Hōkoku); 91. "Harshness (Pt. 1)" (秋霜烈日 その1, Shūshō Retsujitsu Sono 1)
12	May 12, 2021	978-4-06-523317-7	April 23, 2024	979-8-88933-395-1
92. "Harshness (Pt. 2)" (秋霜烈日 その2, Shūshō Retsujitsu Sono 2); 93. "Harshness (Pt. 3)" (秋霜烈日 その3, Shūshō Retsujitsu Sono 3); 94. "Harshness (Pt. 4)" (秋霜烈日 その4, Shūshō Retsujitsu Sono 4); 95. "Harshness (Pt. 5)" (秋霜烈日 その5, Shūshō Retsujitsu Sono 5); 96. "Harshness (Pt. 6)" (秋霜烈日 その6, Shūshō Retsujitsu Sono 6); 97. "Harshness (Final Part)" (秋霜烈日 最終話, Shūshō Retsujitsu Saishū Banashi); 98. "I Want to Have Sex" (セックスしたい, Sekkusu Shitai); 99. "Life" (ライフ, Raifu); 100. "What I Want to Tell You" (伝えたいこと, Tsutaetai Koto)
