= Such a Treacherous Piano Sonata =

Japanese manga series

- First tankōbon volume cover

世にも不実なピアノソナタ (Yonimo Fujitsuna Piano Sonata)
- Genre: Drama, romance
- Manga
- Written by: Hal Osaka
- Published by: Kodansha
- English publisher: NA: Kodansha USA (digital)
- Imprint: Kodansha Comics BL
- Magazine: Be Love
- Original run: December 28, 2017 – April 1, 2019
- Volumes: 3

Such a Treacherous Piano Sonata (Japanese: 世にも不実なピアノソナタ, Hepburn: Yonimo Fujitsuna Piano Sonata) is a Japanese manga series written and illustrated by Hal Osaka. It was serialized in Kodansha's josei manga magazine Be Love from December 2017 to April 2019, with its chapters collected in three tankōbon volumes.

== Publication ==
Written and illustrated by Hal Osaka, Such a Treacherous Piano Sonata was serialized in Kodansha's josei manga magazine Be Love from December 28, 2017, to April 1, 2019. Kodansha collected its chapters in three tankōbon volumes, released from June 13, 2018, to June 13, 2019.

The manga has been licensed for English digital release by Kodansha USA.

=== Volumes ===
No.	Original release date	Original ISBN	English release date	English ISBN
1	June 13, 2018	978-4-06-511770-5	June 14, 2022	978-1-68491-211-7
2	October 12, 2018	978-4-06-513279-1	July 13, 2022	978-1-68491-349-7
3	June 13, 2019	978-4-06-516340-5	August 9, 2022	978-1-68491-389-3
