= Hella Chill Monsters =

Japanese manga series

- First tankōbon volume cover

やすらかモンスターズ (Yasuraka Monsutāzu)
- Genre: Fantasy comedy; Slice of life
- Manga
- Written by: Shuji Takeya
- Published by: Kodansha
- English publisher: NA: Kodansha USA (digital)
- Magazine: Monthly Morning Two
- Original run: July 22, 2017 – May 22, 2018
- Volumes: 3
- icon

Hella Chill Monsters (Japanese: やすらかモンスターズ, Hepburn: Yasuraka Monsutāzu) is a Japanese manga series written and illustrated by Shuji Takeya. It was serialized in Kodansha's seinen manga magazine Monthly Morning Two from July 2017 to May 2018, with its chapters collected in three tankōbon volumes.

== Publication ==
Written and illustrated by Shuji Takeya, Hella Chill Monsters was serialized in Kodansha's seinen manga magazine Monthly Morning Two from July 22, 2017, to May 22, 2018. Kodansha collected its chapters in three tankōbon volumes, released from December 21, 2017, to July 23, 2018.

In July 2022, Kodansha USA announced that they had licensed the manga for English digital release in North America, with the first volume set to be released on July 19 of the same year.

=== Volumes ===
No.	Original release date	Original ISBN	English release date	English ISBN
1	December 21, 2017	978-4-06-510680-8	July 19, 2022	978-1-68491-163-9
2	February 23, 2018	978-4-06-510679-2	August 16, 2022	978-1-68491-215-5
3	July 23, 2018	978-4-06-511711-8	September 20, 2022	978-1-68491-347-3
