= Maga-Tsuki =

Manga

- Volume 1 of the Japanese release.

まがつき
- Genre: Harem, Mythic fiction
- Manga
- Written by: Hoshino Taguchi
- Published by: Kodansha
- English publisher: NA: Kodansha USA
- Magazine: Monthly Shonen Sirius
- Original run: April 2011 – February 2017
- Volumes: 13

Maga-Tsuki (まがつき) (Note: The title refers to gods of misfortune (禍津日神, Magatsuhinokami).) is a shōnen manga series by Hoshino Taguchi, who got the idea for the story after visiting a shrine. The story follows Yasuke, who is about to confess his love to his childhood friend when he is cursed by accidentally breaking a mirror at his family's shrine. The curse causes him to be linked to the goddess of misfortune Orihime at all times or else he will die. He can only be revived by having her kiss him which among other things causes problems with his relationship with his childhood friend. Maga-Tsuki was first serialized in Monthly Shonen Sirius starting in April, 2011, and ran until February, 2017. The series was released in manga format in Japan that spanned thirteen volumes which were released by Kodansha. Outside of Japan, the manga was adapted into an English language format that is being released by Kodansha USA. Eight English language manga volumes have also been released with more announced through 2016. The English adaptation has received several reviews from critics.

== Concept ==
While visiting a shrine, manga author Hoshino Taguchi thought to himself to whom he was praying to. He stated that Japanese people do not correctly differentiate between shrines, and temples which makes it seem rude to the deity when the person does not know to whom they are making a request to. Hoshino kept the idea of "Poor gods all people ever do is ask things of them", and incorporated it into a new story after reading about Japanese mythology.

== Plot ==
Yasuke is a first year high school student who has feelings for his childhood friend Akari. He lives at a shrine, where his older sister is a shrine priestess, and caretaker though she neglects some of her duties for her brother to clean up. After Akari is invited over by his sister, Yasuke sees this as the perfect time to confess his feelings towards her, but ends up accidentally breaking a mirror in the shrine. The result is that he is cursed by Orihime, the goddess of misfortune who takes his soul into her. To make matters worse if he is separated from her then he dies, and can only be brought back to life through her kissing him. When Akari suddenly sees Orihime she storms off thinking that Yasuke did this in order to hurt her as she also has feelings for him. Orihime initially asks Yasuke to make her happy which will lift the curse, but due to his childhood friend storming off he is upset with her. Orihime soon breaks down into tears which causes the destruction of the things around him. Realizing this he soon is able to calm her down.

His sister eventually finds out, and is able to help convince almost everyone at his school that they are related. Akari is not convinced but feels better after Hinata introduces herself as Orihime's sister, and asks her to break the two up. Hinata later reveals herself to be Amaterasu, goddess to the universe who declares that she is going to reseal Orihime into the mirror. In her attempt to do so though, Yasuke's soul goes into Akari causing the two to remain in close contact at all times or else he will die. Akari is relieved to hear about the curse as a reason for the misunderstandings, but Hinata tells Yasuke that his goal to make her sister happy has not changed.

Amaterasu eventually also falls in love with Yasuke, and a third heroine named Izuna Amatake is introduced who also falls for him. Yasuke meets with his fiancée/cousin named Momoko Yamato and although she became disillusioned with him, she still continues to love enough that at the end she returns to join them. Yasuke regains his soul at the end of the series, and a joint marriage is held between Yasuke and all the heroines including his cousin. Orihime becomes purified so she can no longer cause calamity, and they all decide to live together.

== Characters ==
Yasuke Arahabaki (荒巾岐 八助, Arahabaki Yasuke)
Yasuke is a high school boy who is accidentally cursed by Orihime, which causes his soul to be pushed out of his body and reside in the nearest vessel, which was initially Orihime. He must always remain in contact with the 'vessel' otherwise his body will die. If he does die then if he is within a few minutes, kissed by the vessel then his body may be revived. They eventually discover that his soul can be 'influenced' and be drawn into another vessel, if that vessel were to have strong feelings about him. However this usually results in his death and revival by the new vessel. He is unable to return his soul to his own body as the curse placed on him, acts as a barrier.
Akari Inamori (稲森 アカリ, Inamori Akari)
Akari is Yusuke's classmate, neighbour and childhood friend who has feelings for him but is too shy to reveal them. Her father is extremely protective of her, and hopes that she and Yasuke will get married so that she will always stay with him though Akari herself secretly thinks the same.
Orihime (織姫)
Orihime is a goddess of misfortune who cursed Yasuke by taking his soul into herself after he accidentally broke the mirror which she resided in at his family's shrine. Her full name is Seoritsuhime. She poses as Yasuke's cousin in order to blend in. She must be kept happy at all times, as when she becomes sad, she releases a dark miasma, that causes calamity to all around her, though she is purified near the end regains her full power.
Hinata (ひなた)
Hinata is the goddess of the sun and Orihime's younger sister. Her real name is Amaterasu; she chose the name Hinata in order to better blend in while on earth. She initially comes to seal her sister away again in the mirror, but chooses to stay by her side to ensure her happiness when Yasuke's soul transfers into Akari. She later develops feelings for him after he accidentally sees her naked, and curses him as well in order for him to stay by her side ensuring her happiness. In the third volume she takes Yasuke's soul into herself and he learns that despite her being a powerful goddess due to her high position she is lonely without friends. She confesses her love to him at the conclusion of the third volume as she sees him as a kind person who treats her as an equal.
Izuna Amatake (甘岳 いづな, Izuna)
Izuna first appears in the fourth volume of the manga, and is a fox god of a mountain that Yasuke visits while on a school camping trip. She falls in love with him after he notices her forgotten hidden shrine in the woods, and goes to pay his respects. When first making her presence known, she announces that she has become Yasuke's wife after she seals a "vow" with a kiss which does not sit well though with Akari, Orihime, and Hinata. Izuna has the ability to take the form of anyone she chooses but decides to take her own form when confronted by Akari who says that she has to meet the person she loves as herself.
Miyano Arahabaki (荒巾岐 宮乃, Arahabaki Miyano)
Yasuke's sister Miyano is the family's current head shirne priestess though she retires after Yasuke becomes the head priest at the end. She is shown to have mysterious connections that enable her to get Orihime enrolled into school among other things.
Momoko Yamato (ヤマト モモコ, Yamato Momoko)
Momoko first appears in the eleventh volume of the manga, and is Yasuke's distant relative (probably second cousin;supposedly her grandmother is his grandmother's cousin or sister). She is introduced as Yasuke's fiancée as she has loved him and has been looking forward to marrying him for 10 years; even training her bridal skills (at first Yasuke wrongly believes this is based on a promise he flippantly made with her when she was younger though it later turns out to be from idle talk between their grandmothers and his mistaking it as them being serious). She wrongly thinks of Yasuke as a pure saint, but after a contest which ends up showing off Yasuke true personality she becomes disillusioned with him and believe herself to be weak goes off to continue her bridal training. She returns in the end with the goddesses to marry Yasuke which they all do.(polygamous ending i.e. harem end)

== Release ==
Maga-Tsuki was first serialized in manga magazine Monthly Shonen Sirius starting in April, 2011, and later concluded in the February, 2017 issue. The first manga volume of Maga-Tsuki was released in Japan by Kodansha on August 9, 2011. Thirteen volumes have been released so far, the most recent being on April 7, 2017. Crunchyroll first announced that an English adaptation would be available on its website on November 25, 2014. Having picked up the license, Kodansha USA later announced at Anime Expo 2015 that it was planning to release Maga-Tsuki sometime in February, 2016. The first English language manga volume was released in March, 2016 in both digital, and print formats. In addition to North America, the series has also been released in Australia through Random House. Eight volumes have been released so far with upcoming volumes to be released via omnibus format.

=== Volumes ===
No.	Original release date	Original ISBN	English release date	English ISBN
1	August 9, 2011	978-4-06-376286-0	March 22, 2016	978-1-63-236239-1
2	January 6, 2012	978-4-06-376317-1	April 26, 2016	978-1-63-236240-7
3	June 8, 2012	978-4-06-376346-1	June 28, 2016	978-1-63-236241-4
4	October 9, 2012	978-4-06-376363-8	August 30, 2016	978-1-63-236242-1
5	February 8, 2013	978-4-06-376381-2	October 11, 2016	978-1-63-236243-8
6	July 9, 2013	978-4-06-376410-9	December 6, 2016	978-1-63-236244-5
7	February 7, 2014	978-4-06-376436-9	April 18, 2017	978-1-63-236245-2
8	August 8, 2014	978-4-06-376482-6	August 15, 2017	978-1-63-236246-9
9	February 9, 2015	978-4-06-376521-2	June 19, 2018	978-1-63-236247-6
10	October 9, 2015	978-4-06-376563-2	omnibus with volume 9, above	—
11	March 9, 2016	978-4-06-390609-7	November 19, 2019	978-1-63-236502-6
12	November 9, 2016	978-4-06-390660-8	omnibus with volume 11, above	—
13	April 7, 2017	978-4-06-390697-4	omnibus with volume 11, above	—

== Reception ==
The English adaptation of Maga-Tsuki has received reviews from critics who specialize in the field. Jordan Richards from Adventures in Poor Taste gave the first volume a score of 4.5/10. He concluded that the harem story was typical when it came to the comedy, and that it left a lot to be desired. Richards also called the characters stereotypical with an almost nonexistent storyline. Anime UK News also gave a review of the first two volumes giving them a 3/10 rating. Reviewer Ian Wolf stated that there was not much that separated Maga-Tsuki from other harem stories. He compared the idea of a curse by a god to Nyan Koi! saying that it "has been done before". Gregory Smith from the Fandom Post though wrote in his review of the first volume that the characters are sincere, and that the artwork is engaging. Smith said while not original, the story does not need "complex world-building". Neo magazine gave the first volume a 3/5 score, and compared it to Oh! My Goddess saying that it throws the latter's premise on its head concluding that Maga-Tsuki is "cute, wacky, harmless fun". Shaenon K. Garrity from Otaku USA said that while the story has comedy potential the action scenes were "visually" confusing. She went on to call the art bland with the female characters having "identical moe faces", but said that the art was nicely executed.

== See also ==
- The Lady's Servant, another manga series by Hoshino Taguchi
