= Telepathic Wanderers =

Japanese manga series

- First tankōbon volume cover
- Genre: Psychological thriller, supernatural
- Manga
- Written by: Yasutaka Tsutsui
- Illustrated by: Sayaka Yamazaki
- Published by: Kodansha
- English publisher: NA: Tokyopop
- Magazine: Bessatsu Young Magazine
- Original run: 2001 – 2002
- Volumes: 4

Telepathic Wanderers, known in Japan as Nanase, is a Japanese manga written by Yasutaka Tsutsui and illustrated by Sayaka Yamazaki. The manga was licensed in English by Tokyopop. The manga is based on Tsutsui's novel, Nanase Futatabi.

== Manga ==
Kodansha released the manga's four tankōbon collected volumes between September 6, 2001, and March 6, 2003. Tokyopop released the manga's four volumes between November 8, 2005, and October 31, 2006.

=== Volumes ===
No.	Original release date	Original ISBN	English release date	English ISBN
1	September 6, 2001	978-4-06-336979-3	November 8, 2005	978-1-59-532938-7
2	March 6, 2002	978-4-06-361026-0	March 7, 2006	978-1-59-532939-4
3	December 26, 2002	978-4-06-361090-1	July 3, 2006	978-1-59-532940-0
4	March 6, 2003	978-4-06-361134-2	October 31, 2006	978-1-59-532941-7

== Reception ==
Anime News Network's Theorin Martin commends the manga for "solid storytelling and goodly amounts of fan services." Anime News Network's Theorin Martin commends the manga for its artwork but criticises the manga for bring "overly dramatic in normal speech." IGN commends the manga for its art and Japan's Isaac Asimov, Yasutaka Tsutsui, for his storytelling. Mania.com's Jarred Pine commends the manga for its "good entry into the mystery, psychological thriller genre".
