= Rainbow Prelude =

Manga by Osamu Tezuka

- Image of the cover for Rainbow Prelude from the Osamu Tezuka Manga Complete Works edition.

虹のプレリュード (Niji no Pureryūdo)
- Genre: Romance, drama
- Manga

The Curtain is Still Blue Tonight
- Written by: Osamu Tezuka
- Published by: Kobunsha
- Published: January 1, 1958
- Manga

Peacock Shell
- Written by: Osamu Tezuka
- Published by: Kobunsha
- Published: June 1958
- Manga

The Merchant of Venice
- Written by: Osamu Tezuka
- Published by: Kodansha
- Magazine: Chugaku Ichinen Course
- Published: April 1959
- Manga

Song of the White Peacock
- Written by: Osamu Tezuka
- Published by: Kodansha
- Magazine: Nakayoshi
- Published: Summer 1959
- Manga
- Written by: Osamu Tezuka
- Published by: Shogakukan
- Magazine: Shōjo Comic
- Original run: October 5, 1975 – October 26, 1975

Rainbow Prelude (虹のプレリュード, Niji no Pureryūdo) is a manga by Osamu Tezuka, and also the name of one of his books in Kodansha's line of "Osamu Tezuka Manga Complete Works" books, contains a collection of Tezuka's short stories. The stories included in the book are "Rainbow Prelude", "The Curtain is Still Blue Tonight", a manga version of Shakespeare's "The Merchant of Venice", "Peacock Shell", and "Song of the White Peacock".

== Plot ==
=== Rainbow Prelude ===
A young French girl meets and falls in love with Frédéric Chopin, at the time when Poland was occupied by Russian troops.

== See also ==
- List of Osamu Tezuka manga
- The Merchant of Venice, the original play by Shakespeare.
