= Gyōten Ningen Batseelor =

Manga and anime series

- Promotional Image for Gyōten Ningen Batseelor

仰天人間バトシーラー (Gyōten Ningen Batoshīrā)
- Manga
- Written by: Fumiaki Tatesako
- Published by: Kodansha
- Magazine: Comic BonBon
- Original run: May 15, 2000 – May 15, 2002
- Volumes: 3
- Anime television series
- Directed by: Yoshihiro Takamoto
- Produced by: Masato Iwanaga (TV Aichi); Noboru Yamada (Tokyu Agency); Kōichirō Aoki (Group TAC); Jeong-ryeol Hwang (Daiwon C&A)
- Written by: Yū Yamamoto
- Music by: Sage Koizumi
- Studio: Group TAC
- Original network: TV Tokyo
- Original run: 7 April 2001 – 30 March 2002
- Episodes: 52
- Manga

Gyōten Ningen Batseelor ~Gattsu to Oruka no Bouken Densetsu~
- Written by: Mahoto Kaji
- Published by: Kodansha
- Magazine: Comic BonBon
- Original run: November 2001 – April 2002
- Volumes: 2

Gyōten Ningen Batseelor (仰天人間バトシーラー, Gyōten Ningen Batoshīrā; lit. 'Astonishing Human Batseelor') is an anime series created by Itaru Ueda based on a series of illustrated seals sold with chocolate from Meiji Seika. A manga series of the same title was also serialized by Fumiaki Tatesako. The anime series ran in Japan from April 7, 2001, until March 30, 2002. At the moment, the anime is known as Captain Fatz and the Seamorphs and is currently shown in syndication in Singapore at six in the morning on MediaCorp TV.

A now defunct Filipino dubbed Captain Fatz series, as it was called in the Philippines, was aired by GMA from 2004 to 2005 to be followed with Shaman King on weekdays. It was also used as the title for a failed Canadian-produced English dub pilot. The dub pilot featured Jane Luk.

== Plot ==
The story revolves around Jan Zaru and her quest to restore peace in the world. Jan Zaru with Captain Fatz and the Seahorse's crew travel around the world to collect the peace stones and restore the balance of the elements.

== Characters ==
The younger members of the Seahorse Crew. Matatabi Maru, Tushi Warashi, An Unknown Member and Gorgo Machi.

Seahorse's crew

- Captain Fatz is a pirate from the land of water. He is the gluttonous captain of the Seahorse he travels around the world with Lady Maid, Wave Knight, Tushi Warashi. He has a pet parrot. While on his travels he bumps into Gay and was cursed and turned fat. The crew was later joined by Jan Zaru and Gorgo Machi. He currently travels with his crew to collect the peace stones to restore peace in the world and break the curse cast upon him by Gay. He is the elemental warrior of Water. Captain Fatz is skilled a swordsman and a cunning pirate. He has the ability to wield the eight peace stones. As Captain Gatz Aqua, he can use the powers of water. He can also use the powers of the other elements depending on the peace stone he wields.
- Tuchi Warashi
- Wave Knight
- Lady Maid is a cheerful mermaid who serves Captain Fatz and the Seahorse Crew, specifically making meals for the captain. She is accompanied by her pet sea cat, Hotsei.
- Jan Zaru is a warrior from the land of light. She was tasked by the priestess of light to collect the eight peace stones to keep the balance of power in the world. During her journey to collect the stones she met Gay and was transformed to a monkey by Gay's curse. She is currently traveling with Captain Fatz and the Seahorse's crew. Still collecting the stones and trying to restore peace in the world. She always get into a squabble with Captain Fatz. She dislikes Captain Fatz's lazy and gluttonous ways. She has a crush on Captain Gatz. She doesn't know that Captain Fatz and Captain Gatz are the same being.
- Gorgo Machi is the younger sister of Gorgo Girl. She is a shy little girl. She met the Captain Fatz and the gang in the land of Darkness. She helped the Seahorse's crew defeat Gay's minions. She tagged along with the gang to find her sister and help search for the peace stones. Gorgo Machi changes to Gorgo Fairy when she cries. Gorgo Fairy is more mature and wears a sexier outfit. She carries a skull wand. She also now has snake hairs. Her tears can transform Jan Zaru to Jan Zaruko. She gave a vial of her tears to Jan Zaru. As Gorgo Fairy she can remove Gay's control over other beings.
- Matatabi Maru
- Sugisaku

Antagonists

- Gay
- Gorgo Girl

Eight Elemental Warriors

- Captain Gatz Aqua
- Super Jan Zaruko
- Super Gorgoness
- Super Otakebi Maru
- Super Tuchinko
- Super Idisu Saber
- Super Mighty Gold Remu
- Super Guramax

== Theme songs ==
- Opening Theme

Let's Sail! Batseelor by Aya Nozawa (野沢あや)

- Closing Theme

Mahou no Kotoba (まほうのことば; lit. 'Magical word') by Masumi Itō (伊藤真澄)
