= Shi to Kanojo to Boku =

Japanese manga and television series

死と彼女とぼく
- Genre: Horror
- Manga
- Written by: Madoka Kawaguchi
- Published by: Kodansha
- Magazine: Suspense & Horror
- Original run: 1991 – 1999
- Volumes: 10
- Manga

Shi to Kanojo to Boku Yukari
- Manga

Shi to Kanojo to Boku Meguru
- Published by: Kodansha
- Magazine: Kiss Plus
- Television drama
- Produced by: Kōichi Funatsu
- Original run: 21 September 2012 – present

Shi to Kanojo to Boku (死と彼女とぼく; lit. 'Death, the Girl, and I') is a Japanese horror manga series written and illustrated by Madoka Kawaguchi. It was adapted into a television series that premiered on 21 September 2012 in Japan.

== Characters ==
- Yukari Tokino (Azusa Mine)
- Yūsaku Matsumi (Tomohiro Ichikawa)
- Natsumi (Atsuko Sakurai)
