= Satoko and Nada =

Japanese manga series by Yupechika

- First tankōbon volume cover

サトコとナダ (Satoko to Nada)
- Genre: Comedy, slice of life
- Manga
- Written by: Yupechika
- Published by: Seikaisha
- English publisher: NA: Seven Seas Entertainment
- Imprint: Seikaisha Comics
- Magazine: Saizensen
- Original run: January 24, 2017 – November 30, 2018
- Volumes: 4

Satoko and Nada (サトコとナダ, Satoko to Nada) is a Japanese four-panel manga series written and illustrated by Yupechika. It was serialized on the Twi4 Twitter account and Saizensen website between January 2017 and November 2018.

== Synopsis ==
The series is centered around the lives of two women studying at a university in the United States. Satoko is a Japanese woman who has become roommates with Nada, a woman from Saudi Arabia. As the two live alongside each other, they learn about each others' way of living.

== Publication ==
Written and illustrated by Yupechika with supervision by Marie Nishimori, Satoko and Nada was serialized on the Twi4 Twitter account and the Saizensen website between January 24, 2017, and November 30, 2018. The series' chapters were compiled into four tankōbon volumes from July 8, 2017, to December 12, 2018. The series is licensed in English by Seven Seas Entertainment.

No.	Original release date	Original ISBN	North American release date	North American ISBN
1	July 8, 2017	978-4-06-369572-4	October 9, 2018	978-1-626929-09-8
2	December 8, 2017	978-4-06-510770-6	June 25, 2019	978-1-626929-85-2
3	April 28, 2018	978-4-06-511432-2	June 16, 2020	978-1-64275-100-0
4	December 12, 2018	978-4-06-513825-0	December 29, 2020	978-1-64505-525-9

== Reception ==
The series was nominated for the 3rd Next Manga Awards in the web category 2017, where it ranked 4th. The series was also ranked 3rd in the 2018 edition of Takarajimasha's Kono Manga ga Sugoi! guidebook for the best manga for female readers. The series was also listed in the 2020 and 2021 editions of the Young Adult Library Services Association's Great Graphic Novels for Teens.
