= Godhand Teru =

Japanese manga series

- First tankōbon volume cover

ゴッドハンド輝 (Goddo Hando Teru)
- Genre: Medical
- Manga
- Written by: Kazuki Yamamoto
- Published by: Kodansha
- Magazine: Weekly Shōnen Magazine
- Original run: March 21, 2001 – October 5, 2011
- Volumes: 62
- Television drama
- Directed by: Shimoyama Ten; Tsukamoto Renpei
- Written by: Fukasawa Masaki; Kazuki Yamamoto
- Original network: TBS
- Original run: April 11, 2009 – May 16, 2009
- Episodes: 6
- Manga

Godhand Teru: Kamigami no Sōheki
- Written by: Kazuki Yamamoto
- Published by: Kodansha
- Magazine: Weekly Shōnen Magazine
- Original run: January 25, 2012 – February 15, 2012
- Manga

Godhand Teru: Chinmoku no Corona 2020
- Written by: Kazuki Yamamoto
- Published by: Kodansha
- Magazine: Weekly Shōnen Magazine
- Original run: June 17, 2020 – July 8, 2020
- Volumes: 1
- icon

Godhand Teru (Japanese: ゴッドハンド輝, Hepburn: Goddo Hando Teru) is a Japanese manga series written and illustrated by Kazuki Yamamoto. It was serialized in Kodansha's shōnen manga magazine Weekly Shōnen Magazine from 2001 to 2011, with its chapters collected in 62 tankōbon volumes. A four-chapter story, Godhand Teru: Kamigami no Sōheki, was published in the same magazine in 2012, and another four-chapter story, Godhand Teru: Chinmoku no Corona 2020, was published in the same magazine 2020. A six-episode television drama adaptation was broadcast on TBS in 2009.

== Characters ==
Teru Mahigashi (真東 輝, Mahigashi Teru)
Portrayed by: Yuta Hiraoka
Teru is a surgeon at Yasuda Memorial Hospital. When he was young, he was the only survivor who was saved in a plane crash. His father Mahigashi Kousuke, who was a famous surgeon called "Godhand", died. He has a handprint bruise on his chest from when his father performed CPR on him right after the accident. Because he has an honest and earnest personality, he is loved by many people, regardless of whether they are hospital staff or patients. He is slow when it comes to love and flustered by those around him. Most patients looks at him as the careless doctor because of his personality but it makes the patients feel more fun when Teru is around. Teru has records of no death patients in his treatment, growing curiosity from Kitami and Yasuda about his sudden instinct that save people's life and no death of patient under his treatment. Every patient that treated by Teru are always stabilized and recovered to full condition.
Shinomiya Kozue (四宮 梢)
Portrayed by: Asami Mizukawa
Shinomiya Kozue is a surgeon at Yasuda Memorial Hospital. She respects Kitami because of her skill that is called "Kitami's revival". She thinks that the only thing that doctors need is "technique" and only sees patients as "tools" to give full play to her skills but she matures into a true doctor through his contact with a patient in a situation similar to his own. She considers Teru, who is being guided by Kitami, her rival, but displays good coordination in surgeries. She is the younger sister of Shinomiya Kei and Shinomiya Ren, when she was assigned at Yasuda memorial Hospital her childhood friend, Toyoshima Hajime accompanies her and she realize she is not a Princess when she was working at Valhalla. Kozue often gain many experience she never learn on Shieikai as she understand that knowledge was not everything instead combination of knowledge and experience was everything to treat patient.
Shinomiya Ren (四宮 蓮)
Portrayed by: Jun Kaname
Shinomiya Ren is a surgeon at Shieikai Hospital. He is Kozue's older brother and a bachelor. His surgery skills are on an equal footing as Kitami. When he has surgeries, he always arranges to have the same staff as his assistants and operates as if he were dancing to rock. He is disgusted at Shieikai's system and schemes to bring Kozue back to Shieikai in order to rebuild the hospital. His personality is completely erratic, no one was able to know his true personality or even intentions. He is always tagging along with his childhood friend, Araragi Osafune and when Ren was two years old he was surgeried by Mahigashi Kousuke when he have tetralogi fallot on his heart. Ren is the only person that secretly rebels against his father will and planning to put Kei as successor of Shieikai Emperor instead of his father. He even got support personally from Shinomiya Ryuho, current Shieikai Emperor to smooth up his plans.
Kitami Shuichi (北見 柊一)
Portrayed by: Tetsuya Bessho
Kitami Shuichi is the Head of Surgery at Yasuda Memorial Hospital and Teru's preceptor. Single. His speciality is heart surgery. He was stunned when he saw Yasuda's surgery and he came to Yasuda Memorial Hospital. His shock from the death of the first patient he had grown close to resulted in his only mistake in a surgery. He learnt from that experience and is calm and collected at all times. As Teru's supervising doctor, he is strict with him and also has expectations of him. He wields "Ice Scalpel" nickname because of his prowess of performing surgery with cold, sharp and precision in every surgery. Yasuda Junji have an interest with him since Kitami found lymph glands when at operation one of University's Instructor. Kitami willing to give up the next generation of Chief Instructor at T University after Professor Shiwaku, Kitami's Instructor fires him instead of accepting his resignation. He is more motivated since his close friend's death, Kurahashi and willing to build reinforced mental to surpass it. Right now he is Head of Surgery concurrent positions as Yasuda's personal Right hand, whenever Yasuda was assigned to go overseas Kitami always been selected to take over his job as director.
Yasuda Junji (安田 潤司)
Portrayed by: Atsuro Watabe
Yasuda Junji is the Director of Yasuda Memorial Hospital. A talented surgeon with the nickname "Golden Left Hand", he received his training in America and is the man who succeeded in operating Japan's first fetal surgery in utero. He bought out a hospital in the city to carry out a project to pursue the medical care of his dreams. He loves jesting, has a cheerful personality and his behaviour, which includes frequenting shops, is uncharacteristic of a hospital director. He met Teru's father, Kousuke, in America, and sought to be in the "realm of God" because he saw his "Godhand" surgeries. Yasuda Memorial Hospital is a promise of Yasuda Junji to Kousuke Mahigashi and Valhalla project is also part of the promise from Yasuda himself to Kousuke in order to create Godhands from Yasuda Memorial. He was the only person that able to recruit many potential Doctors that was inside his criteria that can be sit on the Throne of The Gods. The reason name is Valhalla because Yasuda believes every doctor in his hospital are sitting in each of Throne of the gods. His right hand was Kitami Shuichi which often he gave Kitami his position temporarily as director while Yasuda is away to overseas for world conference.
Shinomiya Kei (四ノ宮けい)
Shinomiya Kei is an eternal rival against Mahigahsi Teru. He is more talented at technique but lack of teamwork, most of his surgery operating without Kitami are performing likely by his own and believe by his own technique. Sano Reiko, Takaoka and several doctors of Valhalla already noticed about his solo play on surgery operation. Since he is assigned on Yasuda Memorial Hospital, Kei was sent to many departments and defeated many times in a challenge against Teru because of Teru's great teamwork and higher performance, making him more working hard to surpass him and admits Teru as his rival include learning more about teamwork from Kitami. His admittance of one of Godhand are relinquished once he doesn't have affiliation with Yasuda Memorial Hospital anymore but he has will to revive his grandmother's with that was deceased around 10 years ago, Shinomiya Chie before returning to Valhalla until he can revive his grandmother's will.
Sumeragi Rikuto (皇りくと)
CEO of Sumeragi Group and a genius programmer, he was interested in Yasuda Memorial and creator of Leben, the artificial operation and willing to save more lives by implementing Leben to the doctors to increase surgery performance. He became the CEO of Yasuda Memorial once he bought property of entire Yasuda Memorial property as the payment of gratitude after Yasuda Junji performing uterus surgery to save his child that was still inside womb of his wife. He is motivated since his brother's death and willing to involve himself in medical world. He is willing to protect Yasuda Memorial and the networks around Ryugu town (except Shieikai Networks) with any means necessary. He often visits Valhalla to control and especially asking about Teru's behavior which makes him even more interested. Co-operation Electric Chart is his ultimate weapon to interact with people that defeats every Electronic Chart in a conference even Shieikai Electronic chart.

== Media ==
=== Manga ===
Written and illustrated by Kazuki Yamamoto, Godhand Teru was first published as a one-shot chapter in Kodansha's shōnen manga magazine Weekly Shōnen Magazine on July 26, 2000; it was later serialized in the same magazine from March 21, 2001, to October 5, 2011. A four-chapter series, titled Godhand Teru: Kamigami no Sōheki (ゴッドハンド輝 神々の双璧), was serialized in the same magazine from January 25 to February 15, 2012; another three-chapter series, Godhand Teru: Kamigami no Yakusoku (ゴッドハンド輝 神々の約束), was serialized from March 28 to April 11. Kodansha collected the overall chapters in 62 tankōbon volumes, released from July 17, 2001, to May 17, 2012.

Another four-chapter series, titled Godhand Teru: Chinmoku no Corona 2020 (ゴッドハンド輝 ～沈黙のコロナ2020～), was serialized in the same magazine from June 17 to July 8, 2020. A single tankōbon volume was released on August 17, 2020.

=== Drama ===
A six-episode television drama adaptation was broadcast on TBS from April 11 to May 16, 2009.

== Reception ==
By June 2020, the manga had over 9 million copies in circulation.
