= Piano Duo for the Left Hand =

Japanese manga series

- First tankōbon volume cover

左手のための二重奏 (Hidarite no Tame no Nijūsō)
- Genre: Drama, supernatural
- Manga
- Written by: Kenta Matsuoka
- Published by: Kodansha
- English publisher: NA: Kodansha USA (digital)
- Imprint: Magazine Edge KC
- Magazine: Shōnen Magazine Edge
- Original run: August 17, 2019 – October 17, 2023
- Volumes: 9
- icon

Piano Duo for the Left Hand (Japanese: 左手のための二重奏, Hepburn: Hidarite no Tame no Nijūsō) is a Japanese manga series written and illustrated by Kenta Matsuoka. It was serialized in Kodansha's shōnen manga magazine Shōnen Magazine Edge from August 2019 to October 2023, with its chapters collected in nine tankōbon volumes.

== Publication ==
Written and illustrated by Kenta Matsuoka, Piano Duo for the Left Hand was serialized in Kodansha's shōnen manga magazine Shōnen Magazine Edge from August 17, 2019, to October 17, 2023. Kodansha collected its chapters in nine tankōbon volumes, released from April 16, 2020, to January 17, 2024.

In North America, the manga has been licensed for English digital release by Kodansha USA.

=== Volumes ===
No.	Original release date	Original ISBN	English release date	English ISBN
1	April 16, 2020	978-4-06-518893-4	March 15, 2022	978-1-63699-653-0
2	August 17, 2020	978-4-06-520512-9	April 19, 2022	978-1-68491-131-8
3	January 15, 2021	978-4-06-522083-2	May 17, 2022	978-1-68491-174-5
4	June 17, 2021	978-4-06-523633-8	June 21, 2022	978-1-68491-222-3
5	November 17, 2021	978-4-06-525957-3	August 16, 2022	978-1-68491-361-9
6	June 16, 2022	978-4-06-528221-2	December 20, 2022	978-1-68491-593-4
7	December 15, 2022	978-4-06-530108-1	October 3, 2023	978-1-68491-938-3
8	July 14, 2023	978-4-06-532442-4	November 7, 2023	979-8-88933-192-6
9	January 17, 2024	978-4-06-534007-3	June 18, 2024	979-8-88933-572-6
