= Will It Be the World or Her? =

Japanese manga series

- First tankōbon volume cover

世界か彼女か選べない (Sekai ka Kanojo ka Erabenai)
- Genre: Fantasy; Romantic comedy
- Manga
- Written by: Atsushi Uchiyama
- Published by: Kodansha
- English publisher: NA: Kodansha USA (digital)
- Magazine: Bessatsu Shōnen Magazine
- Original run: April 8, 2017 – August 7, 2020
- Volumes: 9
- icon

Will It Be the World or Her? (Japanese: 世界か彼女か選べない, Hepburn: Sekai ka Kanojo ka Erabenai) is a Japanese manga series written and illustrated by Atsushi Uchiyama. It was serialized in Kodansha's shōnen manga magazine Bessatsu Shōnen Magazine from April 2017 to August 2020, with its chapters collected in nine tankōbon volumes.

== Publication ==
Written and illustrated by Atsushi Uchiyama, Will It Be the World or Her was serialized in Kodansha's shōnen manga magazine Bessatsu Shōnen Magazine from April 8, 2017, to August 7, 2020. Kodansha collected its chapters in nine tankōbon volumes, released from August 9, 2017, to October 9, 2020.

In North America, the manga has been licensed for English digital release by Kodansha USA.

=== Volumes ===
No.	Original release date	Original ISBN	English release date	English ISBN
1	August 9, 2017	978-4-06-510118-6	January 19, 2021	978-1-64659-894-6
2	January 9, 2018	978-4-06-510719-5	February 16, 2021	978-1-64659-959-2
3	June 8, 2018	978-4-06-511568-8	March 16, 2021	978-1-63699-006-4
4	November 9, 2018	978-4-06-513238-8	April 20, 2021	978-1-63699-055-2
5	April 9, 2019	978-4-06-514874-7	May 18, 2021	978-1-63699-101-6
6	September 9, 2019	978-4-06-516447-1	June 15, 2021	978-1-63699-151-1
7	February 7, 2020	978-4-06-518170-6	July 20, 2021	978-1-63699-230-3
8	July 9, 2020	978-4-06-519432-4	August 17, 2021	978-1-63699-299-0
9	October 9, 2020	978-4-06-520681-2	September 21, 2021	978-1-63699-362-1

== Reception ==
The manga has had over 300,000 copies in circulation.
