= Ayanashi =

Japanese manga series

- First volume cover

アヤナシ
- Genre: Adventure; Dark fantasy
- Manga
- Written by: Yukihiro Kajimoto
- Published by: Kodansha
- English publisher: NA: Kodansha USA (digital)
- Magazine: Shōnen Magazine R
- Original run: August 20, 2016 – June 20, 2018
- Volumes: 4

Ayanashi (アヤナシ) is a Japanese manga series written and illustrated by Yukihiro Kajimoto. It was serialized in Kodansha's Shōnen Magazine R from August 2016 to June 2018.

== Publication ==
Written and illustrated byYukihiro Kajimoto, Ayanashi was serialized in Kodansha's Shōnen Magazine R from August 20, 2016, to June 20, 2018. Kodansha collected its chapters in four tankōbon volumes, released from February 17, 2017, to August 17, 2018.

In North America, Kodansha USA released the manga in digital format. The four volumes were published from December 5, 2017, to January 29, 2019.

The manga is also licensed in France by Glénat, in Spain by Norma, and in Germany by Manga Cult.

=== Volumes ===
No.	Original release date	Original ISBN	English release date	English ISBN
1	February 17, 2017	978-4-06-392569-2	December 5, 2017	978-1-64-212003-5
2	August 17, 2017	978-4-06-392597-5	January 2, 2018	978-1-64-212004-2
3	February 16, 2018	978-4-06-510888-8	May 22, 2018	978-1-64-212240-4
4	August 17, 2018	978-4-06-512361-4	January 29, 2019	978-1-64-212631-0
