= When We're in Love =

Japanese manga series

- Cover of the first volume

花君と恋する私 (Hana-kun to Koisuru Watashi)
- Genre: Romance
- Manga
- Written by: Fuyu Kumaoka
- Published by: Kodansha
- English publisher: NA: Kodansha USA
- Imprint: Kodansha Comics Betsufure
- Magazine: Bessatsu Friend
- Original run: April 13, 2011 – present
- Volumes: 10

When We're in Love (花君と恋する私, Hana-kun to Koisuru Watashi; "I'm in Love with Hana-kun") is a Japanese manga series written and illustrated by Fuyu Kumaoka. It began serialization on Kodansha's shōjo manga magazine Bessatsu Friend in April 2011.

Summary: (From Mangatown) Nanase Sakashita is good at playing the role of Model Student but that doesnt stop her from taking an interest in Hana-kun, the schools delinquent. Hana-kun accidentally drops a small box while sneaking around on the school grounds. When Nanase tries to return the box, Hana-kun tells her to keep it for its already too late to give it to the person he likes, who is this person??

'This person' is Komari sensei, a family friend of Hana kun, and homeroom teacher for both Hana and Nanase

The plot is Nanase and Hana falling in love, and Hana resolving/overcoming his childhood trauma.

== Publication ==
Written and illustrated by Fuyu Kamaoka, When We're in Love, began serialization on Kodansha's Bessatsu Friend magazine on April 13, 2011. The series has been on hiatus since 2015 due to Kamaoka's poor health. Its chapters have been compiled into ten tankōbon volumes as of February 2015.

In October 2020, Kodansha USA announced that they licensed the manga for English digital publication.

No.	Original release date	Original ISBN	English release date	English ISBN
1	August 11, 2011	978-4-06-341755-5	October 27, 2020	978-1-64-659704-8
2	February 13, 2012	978-4-06-341784-5	November 24, 2020	978-1-64-659819-9
3	June 13, 2012	978-4-06-341807-1	December 22, 2020	978-1-64-659877-9
4	October 12, 2012	978-4-06-341822-4	January 26, 2021	978-1-64-659923-3
5	February 13, 2013	978-4-06-341841-5	February 23, 2021	978-1-64-659969-1
6	June 13, 2013	978-4-06-341862-0	March 23, 2021	978-1-63-699013-2
7	November 13, 2013	978-4-06-341886-6	April 27, 2021	978-1-63-699060-6
8	March 13, 2014	978-4-06-341906-1	May 25, 2021	978-1-63-699107-8
9	July 11, 2014	978-4-06-341929-0	June 22, 2021	978-1-63-699159-7
10	February 13, 2015	978-4-06-341956-6	July 27, 2021	978-1-63-699241-9

== Reception ==
Volume 4 reached the 32nd place on the weekly Oricon manga charts and, as of October 21, 2012, has sold 46,272 copies; volume 5 reached the 10th place and, as of February 24, 2013, has sold 71,646 copies; volume 6 reached the 9th place and, as of June 22, 2013, has sold 86,789 copies; volume 7 reached the 3rd place and, as of November 24, 2013, has sold 99,870 copies; volume 8 reached the 7th place and, as of March 23, 2014, has sold 107,484 copies; volume 9 reached the 11th place and, as of July 2, 2014, has sold 108,787 copies; volume 10 also reached the 11th place and, as of March 1, 2015, has sold 132,550 copies.
