= Fantasium =

Japanese manga series

- First tankōbon volume cover

ファンタジウム (Fantajiumu)
- Manga
- Written by: Ami Sugimoto
- Published by: Kodansha
- Imprint: Morning KC
- Magazine: Monthly Morning Two (2006–2011); D Morning (2014)
- Original run: August 10, 2006 – December 25, 2014
- Volumes: 9
- icon

Fatasium (Japanese: ファンタジウム, Hepburn: Fantajiumu) is a Japanese manga series written and illustrated by Ami Sugimoto. It was serialized in Kodansha's seinen manga magazine Morning Two from August 2006 to September 2011, and later on the D Morning website from March to December 2011; its chapters were collected in nine tankōbon volumes.

== Publication ==
Written and illustrated by Ami Sugimoto, Fantasium was serialized in Kodansha's seinen manga magazine Morning Two from August 10, 2006, (Note: It started in the magazine's debut issue, released on August 10, 2006.) to September 22, 2011. (Note: It was serialized until the magazine's 50th issue, released on September 22, 2011.) The series took a hiatus of over two years and resumed on the D Morning website on March 6, 2014; it finished on December 25 of that same year. Kodansha collected its chapters in nine tankōbon volumes, released from June 22, 2007, to July 23, 2015.

=== Volumes ===
No.	Japanese release date	Japanese ISBN
1	June 22, 2007	978-4-06-372608-4
2	February 22, 2008	978-4-06-372669-5
3	September 22, 2008	978-4-06-372736-4
4	June 23, 2009	978-4-06-372805-7
5	March 23, 2010	978-4-06-372885-9
6	September 22, 2010	978-4-06-372945-0
7	June 23, 2011	978-4-06-372983-2
8	August 22, 2014	978-4-06-387066-4
9	July 23, 2015	978-4-06-388494-4

== Reception ==
The series ranked tenth on Takarajimasha's Kono Manga ga Sugoi! ranking of best manga for male readers in 2009. Fantasium was one of the Jury Recommended Works at the 14th Japan Media Arts Festival in 2010. It was nominated for the 15th Tezuka Osamu Cultural Prize in 2011. The manga was selected by the Nippon Foundation for its "This is Also a Learning Manga: World Discovery Project", a project to use manga as learning tools for young children. Fantasium was included in the "Diversity" category.
