= The Thief Akikazu Inoue =

Japanese manga

- Image of the cover for The Thief Akikazu Inoue from the Osamu Tezuka Manga Complete Works edition.

火の山 (Hi No Yama)
- Genre: Short stories
- Manga

The Record of Peter Kürten
- Written by: Osamu Tezuka
- Published by: Kodansha
- Magazine: Manga Sunday
- Published: January 10, 1973
- Manga

Sensual Nights
- Written by: Osamu Tezuka
- Published by: Kodansha
- Magazine: Sunday Mainichi
- Original run: May 13, 1973 – May 20, 1973
- Manga

Lord Iechika Mogami
- Written by: Osamu Tezuka
- Published by: Kodansha
- Magazine: Manga Sunday
- Published: October 18, 1972
- Manga

Lay of the Rhine
- Written by: Osamu Tezuka
- Published by: Kodansha
- Magazine: Josei Jishin
- Original run: May 20, 1972 – May 27, 1972
- Manga
- Written by: Osamu Tezuka
- Published by: Kodansha
- Magazine: Big Gold
- Published: March 30, 1979

The Thief Akikazu Inoue (火の山, Hi No Yama) is a manga by Osamu Tezuka, and also the name of one of his books in Kodansha's line of "Osamu Tezuka Manga Complete Works" books containing a collection of Tezuka's short stories. The stories included in this book are "The Record of Peter Kürten", "Sensual Nights", "Lord Iechika Mogami", "Lay of the Rhine", and "The Thief Akikazu Inoue".

== Plot ==
"The Record of Peter Kürten"
Peter Kürten, a former prisoner-of-war, forms an idealistic couple with his wife and is a devoted unionist at meetings. In actuality he is a sexually perverted serial killer nicknamed the Vampire of Düsseldorf who taunts the police with escalating murders. After one of the murders, the police force a fake confession from another man, causing Peter to angrily reveal the truth to his wife, who gives him up to the police. At trial it is revealed that Peter is actually a criminal with a history of incest, bestiality, arson, and murder. When his lawyer tries to defend him by claiming madness, Peter angrily exclaims that his actions are revenge against the bourgeois. Peter is executed by guillotine. Tezuka based the story on the work of Shunsuke Tsurumi.
"Sensual Nights"
A wealthy Japanese playboy visits Vietnam to seduce a woman who has supposedly stopped aging while waiting for her sweetheart who was taken away by soldiers. As he is in the middle of preparing to have sex with her, his contact tells him that the woman's man was taken away by the Japanese army during the Pacific War, causing a deep hatred of Japanese people in her. He panics, but recovers when the woman reacts by offering him her body. When she fights back against his attempts at intimacy, he tells her that her lover is likely dead and forces himself on her. The man then sees a sight of a wrinkled old woman that startles him so much he jumps out of the window. The woman he had seduced was actually the daughter of the unaging woman and her sweetheart, and his contact was her fiancé.
"The Suspicious Lord Mogami" (Lord Iechika Mogami)
Piipii, a meager farmer, dreams of being a samurai so he can support his wife and their four children. One day he is employed by a lord to be his double, and Piipii's family is secretly killed. Piipii trains to be a lord, grooming and dressing himself to be the spitting image of the lord. As a test, the lord tells him to give the order to open the castle gates. Piipii rides back to visit his family, only to learn about their deaths. On the lord's wedding day, his double is supposed to replace him during the wedding ceremony to protect him from any attempts on his life. During the switch, Piipii murders the lord and consummates the marriage with the lady Sasa instead. When she learns of his identity, the lady has an affair with a syphilitic beggar, and kills herself. The disease spreads to Piipii and Sasa gets her revenge.
"Lady of the Rhine"
A Japanese woman accompanies her husband on a business trip to Düsseldorf. She catches him having an affair, and when she confronts him, he leaves her. As she desperately searches for him in the streets, the woman is hit by a car and is hospitalized for a month. When she recovers, she visits her benefactor Lady Rathwood, the owner of a castle they had visited earlier. As she lives with Lady Rathwood, the woman learns of her hatred for men and her hatred for her husband is kindled. One day she discovers that the car she was hit with belongs to Lady Rathwood and she witnesses Lady Rathwood taking off the disguise of the woman who seduced her husband. Lady Rathwood calls her husband to the castle and gives the woman a knife, telling her to take her revenge. The woman refuses and goes back to her husband.
"The Thief Akikazu Inoue" (The Mountain of Fire)

== See also ==
- List of Osamu Tezuka manga
- Osamu Tezuka
