= Imori 201 =

Japanese manga series

- First tankōbon volume cover

イモリ201
- Genre: Romantic comedy
- Manga
- Written by: Yu Imai
- Published by: Kodansha
- Magazine: Weekly Young Magazine (2010, 2011; one-shots); Monthly Young Magazine (2011–2014)
- Original run: November 22, 2010 – January 8, 2014
- Volumes: 5

Imori 201 (イモリ201) is a Japanese manga series written and illustrated by Yu Imai. It was first published as three one-shot-chapters in Kodansha's seinen manga magazine Weekly Young Magazine in 2010 and continued as a serialized manga in Monthly Young Magazine from January 2011 to January 2014.

== Plot ==
Kawashima has not had any luck with girls. One day, he moves into an apartment and finds that his neighbor is a beautiful girl. She is strange and likes to drink beer, so he tries to find out her identity.

== Publication ==
Written and illustrated by Yu Imai, Imori 201 was first published as a three-part one-shot in Kodansha's seinen manga magazine Weekly Young Magazine from November 22 to December 6, 2010. It was later serialized in Monthly Young Magazine; the first part was published from January 12 to May 5, 2011. Another one-shot chapter was published in Weekly Young Magazine on September 26, 2011, and the second part was published in Monthly Young Magazine from October 12, 2011, to January 8, 2014. Kodansha collected its chapters in five tankōbon volumes, released from July 6, 2011, to March 6, 2014.

=== Volumes ===
No.	Japanese release date	Japanese ISBN
1	July 6, 2011	978-4-06-382057-7
2	April 6, 2012	978-4-06-382161-1
3	November 6, 2012	978-4-06-382236-6
4	July 5, 2013	978-4-06-382323-3
5	March 6, 2014	978-4-06-382438-4

== See also ==
- The Witches of Adamas, another manga series by the same author
