= Suspicion (manga) =

Manga by Osamu Tezuka

サスピション
- Genre: Short stories, horror
- Manga
- Written by: Osamu Tezuka
- Published by: Kodansha
- Magazine: Morning
- Original run: October 21, 1982 – December 16, 1982
- Manga

Insect Collector
- Written by: Osamu Tezuka
- Published by: Kodansha
- Magazine: Weekly Shōnen Magazine
- Published: April 8, 1979
- Manga

Insect Collector – The Butterfly Road Smells of Death
- Written by: Osamu Tezuka
- Published by: Kodansha
- Magazine: Weekly Shōnen Magazine
- Published: May 27, 1979
- Manga

Volcanic Eruption
- Written by: Osamu Tezuka
- Published by: Kodansha
- Magazine: Just Comic
- Published: May 1982
- Manga

Peace Concert
- Written by: Osamu Tezuka
- Published by: Kodansha
- Magazine: FM Reco-pal
- Published: August 12, 1984
- Manga

Activist Student
- Written by: Osamu Tezuka
- Published by: Kodansha
- Magazine: Play Comic
- Published: August 1968
- Manga

Old Folk's Home
- Written by: Osamu Tezuka
- Published by: Kodansha
- Magazine: Big Comic Original
- Published: September 20, 1972

Suspicion (サスピション, Sasupishon) is a manga by Osamu Tezuka, and also the name of one of his books in Kodansha's line of "Osamu Tezuka Manga Complete Works" books containing a collection of Tezuka's short stories. The stories included in this book are "Suspicion", "Insect Collector", "Insect Collector – The Butterfly Road Smells of Death", "Volcanic Eruption", "Peace Concert", "Activist Student", and "Old Folk's Home".

== Plot ==
A man wants to kill his wife, and in order to do so, he begins inputting her data into the cooking robot so she will be the ingredients for the next night's dinner.

== See also ==
- List of Osamu Tezuka manga
- Osamu Tezuka
