= Sachi's Monstrous Appetite =

Japanese manga series

- First tankōbon volume cover

あの人の胃には僕が足りない (Ano Hito no I ni wa Boku ga Tarinai)
- Genre: Horror; Romantic comedy; Supernatural
- Manga
- Written by: Chomoran
- Published by: Kodansha
- English publisher: NA: Kodansha USA
- Imprint: Morning KC
- Magazine: Morning Two
- Original run: February 22, 2018 – January 22, 2021
- Volumes: 6

Sachi's Monstrous Appetite (Japanese: あの人の胃には僕が足りない, Hepburn: Ano Hito no I ni wa Boku ga Tarinai) is a Japanese manga series written and illustrated by Chomoran. It was serialized in Kodansha's seinen manga magazine Monthly Morning Two from February 2018 to January 2021, with its chapters collected in six tankōbon volumes.

== Publication ==
Written and illustrated by Chomoran, Sachi's Monstrous Appetite was serialized in Kodansha's seinen manga magazine Monthly Morning Two from February 22, 2018, to January 22, 2021. Kodansha collected its chapters in six tankōbon volumes, released from July 23, 2018, to March 23, 2021.

In North America, the manga has been licensed for English release by Kodansha USA.

=== Volumes ===
No.	Original release date	Original ISBN	English release date	English ISBN
1	July 23, 2018	978-4-06-511897-9	January 26, 2021	978-1-64651-173-0
2	December 21, 2018	978-4-06-513981-3	May 11, 2021	978-1-64651-183-9
3	June 21, 2019	978-4-06-516020-6	August 3, 2021	978-1-64651-191-4
4	November 22, 2019	978-4-06-517659-7	September 21, 2021	978-1-64651-192-1
5	May 22, 2020	978-4-06-519368-6	December 14, 2021	978-1-64651-229-4
6	March 23, 2021	978-4-06-521867-9	January 18, 2022	978-1-64651-270-6

== Reception ==
The manga ranked 13th in the 2019 Next Manga Award in the print category.
