= Back When You Called Us Devils =

Japanese manga series

- First tankōbon volume cover

君が僕らを悪魔と呼んだ頃 (Kimi ga Bokura o Akuma to Yonda Koro)
- Genre: Horror, thriller
- Manga
- Written by: Takashi Sano
- Published by: Kodansha
- English publisher: NA: Kodansha USA (digital)
- Imprint: Shōnen Magazine Comics
- Magazine: Magazine Pocket
- Original run: August 16, 2017 – August 5, 2020
- Volumes: 14

Back When You Called Us Devils (Japanese: 君が僕らを悪魔と呼んだ頃, Hepburn: Kimi ga Bokura o Akuma to Yonda Koro) is a Japanese web manga series written and illustrated by Takashi Sano. It was serialized in Kodansha's manga website Magazine Pocket from August 2017 to August 2020, with its chapters collected in fourteen tankōbon volumes.

== Publication ==
Written and illustrated by Takashi Sano, Back When You Called Us Devils was serialized in Kodansha's Magazine Pocket website from August 16, 2017, to August 5, 2020. Kodansha collected its chapters in fourteen tankōbon volumes, released from March 9, 2018, to October 9, 2020.

In North America, the manga was licensed for digital release in English by Kodansha USA.

=== Volumes ===
No.	Original release date	Original ISBN	English release date	English ISBN
1	March 9, 2018	978-4-06-511197-0	May 25, 2021	978-1-63699-105-4
2	May 9, 2018	978-4-06-511408-7	June 22, 2021	978-1-63699-163-4
3	July 9, 2018	978-4-06-511785-9	July 27, 2021	978-1-63699-240-2
4	September 7, 2018	978-4-06-512521-2	August 24, 2021	978-1-63699-308-9
5	November 9, 2018	978-4-06-513395-8	September 28, 2021	978-1-63699-375-1
6	February 8, 2019	978-4-06-514421-3	October 26, 2021	978-1-63699-425-3
7	April 9. 2019	978-4-06-515114-3	November 23, 2021	978-1-63699-474-1
8	June 7, 2019	978-4-06-515721-3	December 28, 2021	978-1-63699-531-1
9	September 9, 2019	978-4-06-516790-8	January 25, 2022	978-1-63699-571-7
10	December 9, 2019	978-4-06-517545-3	February 22, 2022	978-1-63699-624-0
11	March 9, 2020	978-4-06-518518-6	March 22, 2022	978-1-63699-664-6
12	May 8, 2020	978-4-06-519430-0	April 26, 2022	978-1-68491-144-8
13	July 9, 2020	978-4-06-520101-5	May 24, 2022	978-1-68491-180-6
14	October 9, 2020	978-4-06-521021-5	June 28, 2022	978-1-68491-233-9

== See also ==
- Kimi ga Kemono ni Naru Mae ni, another manga series by the same author
