= Four-Eyed Prince =

Japanese manga series

- Cover of the first volume of Four-Eyed Prince

メガネ王子 (Megane Ōji)
- Genre: Romance
- Manga
- Written by: Wataru Mizukami
- Published by: Kodansha
- English publisher: Del Rey Manga
- Magazine: Nakayoshi
- Original run: 2007 – 2009
- Volumes: 4

Four-Eyed Prince (Japanese: メガネ王子, Hepburn: Megane Ōji) is a four volume shōjo manga series by Wataru Mizukami (水上航, Mizukami Wataru).

== Reception ==
"Four-Eyed Prince has the depth of a reader letter to Cosmo, but if that sounds like icing on the bespectacled cake, then this is going to be a sweet enough dessert for the younger female crowd." – Joseph Luster, Otaku USA "For a first manga romance, perhaps for a young teen reader graduating up to love stories, I think this is a fine choice." – Johanna Draper Carlson, Manga Worth Reading. "If you have a glasses fetish, there's plenty of eye-candy here for you in the body of the manga and also in the Four Eyed Café Special Report in the extras." – Sakura Eries, Mania. "It's an ultra light and fluffy fun volume of Four-Eyed Prince." – Rachel Bentham, activeAnime.
