= Wonder Cat Kyuu-chan =

Japanese manga series

- First tankōbon volume cover

ふしぎねこのきゅーちゃん (Fushigi Neko no Kyū-chan)
- Genre: Comedy, slice of life
- Manga
- Written by: Sasami Nitori
- Published by: Seikaisha
- English publisher: NA: Seven Seas Entertainment
- Imprint: Seikaisha Comics
- Magazine: Saizensen
- Original run: January 30, 2018 – December 2, 2022
- Volumes: 8

Wonder Cat Kyuu-chan (ふしぎねこのきゅーちゃん, Fushigi Neko no Kyū-chan) is a Japanese four-panel manga series written and illustrated by Sasami Nitori. It was serialized on Seikaisha's Twi4 Twitter account and Saizensen website from January 2018 to December 2022.

== Premise ==
A young man named Hinata takes in Kyuu-chan, an abandoned cat who walks on two legs. The series focuses on the two as they adjust to life with each other.

== Characters ==
Aoi Hinata (日向葵, Hinata Aoi)
Voiced by: Atsushi Tamaru
Kyuu-chan (きゅーちゃん)
Voiced by: Riho Sugiyama

== Media ==
=== Manga ===
Written and illustrated by Sasami Nitori, Wonder Cat Kyuu-chan was serialized on Seikaisha's Twi4 Twitter account and Saizensen website from January 30, 2018, to December 2, 2022. Its chapters were compiled into eight tankōbon volumes from August 11, 2018, to October 7, 2022. The series is licensed in English by Seven Seas Entertainment.

No.	Original release date	Original ISBN	North American release date	North American ISBN
1	August 11, 2018	978-4-06-512661-5	March 9, 2021	978-1-64505-857-1
2	December 12, 2018	978-4-06-514201-1	May 18, 2021	978-1-64505-945-5
3	April 12, 2019	978-4-06-515438-0	October 12, 2021	978-1-64827-306-3
4	October 12, 2019	978-4-06-517205-6	January 25, 2022	978-1-64827-476-3
5	January 14, 2020	978-4-06-518535-3	May 10, 2022	978-1-63858-239-7
6	June 12, 2020	978-4-06-520180-0	July 26, 2022	978-1-63858-390-5
7	November 11, 2020	978-4-06-521657-6	December 20, 2022	978-1-63858-806-1
8	October 7, 2022	978-4-06-529718-6	August 1, 2023	978-1-68579-584-9

=== Other ===
On July 7, 2020, in commemoration of Seikaisha's 10th anniversary, a collaboration between it and anime studio MAPPA was announced. The collaboration was a YouTube channel called "Manimani TV". The channel's content consisted of voice comic adaptations of the series with sound direction by Ryōsuke Naya, and voice acting from Atsushi Tamaru and Riho Sugiyama.

== Reception ==
In 2018, the series was nominated for the 4th Next Manga Awards in the web category and was ranked 9th.

In 2021, the School Library Journal listed the first volume among its Top 10 Manga of 2021.
