= The Witches of Adamas =

Japanese manga series

- First tankōbon volume cover

アダマスの魔女たち (Adamasu no Majo-tachi)
- Genre: Erotic comedy; Harem; Supernatural
- Manga
- Written by: Yu Imai
- Published by: Kodansha
- English publisher: NA: Seven Seas Entertainment
- Magazine: Monthly Young Magazine (July 20, 2018 – November 18, 2021); YanMaga Web (December 20, 2021 – July 13, 2023)
- Original run: July 20, 2018 – July 13, 2023
- Volumes: 11
- icon

The Witches of Adamas (Japanese: アダマスの魔女たち, Hepburn: Adamasu no Majo-tachi) is a Japanese manga series written and illustrated by Yu Imai. It was serialized in Kodansha's seinen manga magazine Monthly Young Magazine from July 2018 to November 2021, and later transferred to Yanmaga Web continuing from December 2021 to July 2023. Its chapters were collected in eleven tankōbon volumes.

== Plot ==
Satou Yukinari learns that he has a magical malady called Adamas. This makes it so that every time he ejaculates, a small diamond passes from his penis like a kidney stone. Every time, it is extremely painful and could potentially kill him. When people learn about this, several girls attempt to seduce him, all greedy for the diamonds and not caring about his well-being.

== Publication ==
Written and illustrated by Yu Imai, The Witches of Adamas was serialized in Kodansha's seinen manga magazine Monthly Young Magazine from July 20, 2018, to November 18, 2021. It was then transferred to the YanMaga Web website on December 20, 2021, and finished on July 13, 2023. Kodansha collected its chapters in eleven tankōbon volumes, released from March 6, 2019, to September 20, 2023.

In North America, Seven Seas Entertainment licensed the manga for English release in both physical and digital format under its Ghost Ship adult imprint. The first volume was released on February 15, 2022.

=== Volumes ===
No.	Original release date	Original ISBN	English release date	English ISBN
1	March 6, 2019	978-4-06-514841-9	February 15, 2022	978-1-64827-785-6
2	September 6, 2019	978-4-06-516989-6	May 24, 2022	978-1-64827-786-3
3	March 6, 2020	978-4-06-518842-2	October 18, 2022	978-1-63858-174-1
4	August 5, 2020	978-4-06-520456-6	January 10, 2023	978-1-63858-263-2
5	January 6, 2021	978-4-06-522009-2	May 30, 2023	978-1-63858-683-8
6	June 17, 2021	978-4-06-523677-2	October 10, 2023	978-1-63858-924-2
7	November 18, 2021	978-4-06-525877-4	February 27, 2024	979-8-88843-419-2
8	April 20, 2022	978-4-06-527461-3	July 16, 2024	979-8-88843-665-3
9	October 20, 2022	978-4-06-529474-1	November 26, 2024	979-8-89160-068-3
10	March 20, 2023	978-4-06-531079-3	March 25, 2025	979-8-89160-573-2
11	September 20, 2023	978-4-06-533033-3	July 29, 2025	979-8-89373-020-3

== Reception ==
In a review of the first volume, Christopher Farris of Anime News Network commented that the series' focus on fanservice as a vehicle for comedy lets it "successfully deploy the kind of content that would only be a distraction in less dedicated works", adding however that due to the nature of its content, which "[o]ccasionally veers close to straight-up pornography before prioritizing for entertaining comedy again", the series "isn't going to be for everybody".

== See also ==
- Imori 201, another manga series by the same author
