= The Lady's Servant =

Japanese manga series

- First tankōbon volume cover

お嬢様の僕 (Ojō-sama no Shimobe)
- Genre: Romantic comedy
- Manga
- Written by: Hoshino Taguchi
- Published by: Kodansha
- English publisher: US: Kodansha
- Imprint: Sirius KC
- Magazine: Magazine Pocket
- Original run: December 27, 2017 – June 11, 2025
- Volumes: 18
- icon

The Lady's Servant (お嬢様の僕, Ojō-sama no Shimobe) is a Japanese manga series written and illustrated by Hoshino Taguchi. It was serialized on Kodansha's Magazine Pocket website and app from December 2017 to June 2025.

== Plot ==
Yotaro Konoe, a teenage boy who is skilled at housekeeping, is hired to become the butler and caretaker of Tsubasa Saionji, a wealthy teenage girl who needs his support to change her clothes and guide her through everyday life.

== Publication ==
Written and illustrated by Hoshino Taguchi, The Lady's Servant was serialized on Kodansha's Magazine Pocket website and app from December 27, 2017, to June 11, 2025. Its chapters were collected in eighteen tankōbon volumes released from June 8, 2018, to August 7, 2025.

Kodansha publishes the series in English on its "K Manga" web service.

| No. | Release date | ISBN |
|---|---|---|
| 1 | June 8, 2018 | 978-4-06-511671-5 |
| 2 | October 9, 2018 | 978-4-06-513096-4 |
| 3 | March 8, 2019 | 978-4-06-514509-8 |
| 4 | July 9, 2019 | 978-4-06-516301-6 |
| 5 | November 8, 2019 | 978-4-06-517586-6 |
| 6 | April 9, 2020 | 978-4-06-519132-3 |
| 7 | September 9, 2020 | 978-4-06-520484-9 |
| 8 | January 8, 2021 | 978-4-06-521933-1 |
| 9 | June 9, 2021 | 978-4-06-523490-7 |
| 10 | January 7, 2022 | 978-4-06-525866-8 |
| 11 | July 7, 2022 | 978-4-06-528493-3 |
| 12 | January 6, 2023 | 978-4-06-530391-7 |
| 13 | June 8, 2023 | 978-4-06-532261-1 |
| 14 | November 9, 2023 | 978-4-06-533707-3 |
| 15 | May 9, 2024 | 978-4-06-535263-2 |
| 16 | October 8, 2024 | 978-4-06-536698-1 |
| 17 | April 9, 2025 | 978-4-06-538732-0 |
| 18 | August 7, 2025 | 978-4-06-540292-4 |

== Reception ==
By April 2025, the series had over 1 million copies in circulation.

== See also ==
- Maga-Tsuki, another manga series by Hoshino Taguchi
