= Our Fake Marriage =

Japanese manga series

- First tankōbon volume cover

ウソ婚 (Usokon)
- Genre: Romance
- Manga
- Written by: Kiwi Tokina
- Published by: Kodansha
- English publisher: NA: Kodansha USA
- Imprint: Kodansha Comics Betsufure
- Magazine: Ane Friend
- Original run: September 1, 2017 – April 1, 2025
- Volumes: 16
- Manga

Our Fake Marriage: Rosé
- Written by: Kiwi Tokina
- Published by: Kodansha
- English publisher: NA: Kodansha USA
- Imprint: Kodansha Comics Betsufure
- Magazine: Ane Friend
- Original run: January 1, 2021 – April 1, 2025
- Volumes: 4
- Television drama
- Directed by: Kento Yamaguchi; Mahito Kimura
- Written by: Naomi Hiruta
- Music by: Yuji Iwamoto
- Studio: Kansai TV
- Original network: FNS (Kansai TV, Fuji TV)
- Original run: July 11, 2023 – September 26, 2023
- Episodes: 12

Our Fake Marriage (ウソ婚, Usokon) is a Japanese manga series written and illustrated by Kiwi Tokina. It was serialized in Kodansha's Ane Friend web magazine from September 2017 to April 2025. A live-action television drama adaptation aired from July to September 2023.

== Plot ==
Having lost both her home and her job, Yae Sendo is at a loss when, by chance, she reunites with her childhood friend, Takumi Natsume. Takumi, who has become a successful first-class architect, asks Yaeko to pretend to be his wife in exchange for letting her live in a luxury high-rise apartment in the city center free of charge.

== Characters ==
Yae Sendo (千堂八重, Sendo Yae)
Portrayed by: Neru Nagahama
Takumi Natsume (夏目匠, Natsume Takumi)
Portrayed by: Fuma Kikuchi
Masaki Shindō (進藤将暉, Shindō Masaki)
Portrayed by: Shota Watanabe

== Media ==
=== Manga ===
Written and illustrated by Kiwi Tokina, Our Fake Marriage was serialized from Kodansha's Ane Friend web magazine on September 1, 2017, to April 1, 2025. Its chapters have been collected in sixteen tankōbon volumes released from April 12, 2019, to July 11, 2025.

During their panel at New York Comic-Con 2019, Kodansha USA announced that they licensed the series for a digital-only English publication.

A spin-off manga, titled Our Fake Marriage: Rosé, was serialized in the same magazine from January 1, 2021, to April 1, 2025. Its chapters have been collected in four tankōbon volumes released from November 12, 2021, to July 11, 2025. In April 2022, Kodansha USA announced that they licensed the spin-off for digital-only English publication.

In January 2025, Tokina announced on her Twitter account that both the series and the spin-off would end serialization in 2025. Both series ended serialization on April 1, 2025.

==== Volumes ====
No.	Original release date	Original ISBN	North American release date	North American ISBN
1	April 12, 2019	978-4-06-515503-5	November 5, 2019	978-1-64-659100-8
Marriages 1–4
2	July 12, 2019	978-4-06-516345-0	December 3, 2019	978-1-64-659155-8
Marriages 5–8
3	October 11, 2019	978-4-06-517268-1	August 4, 2020	978-1-64-659623-2
Marriages 9–12; Special side story
4	March 13, 2020	978-4-06-518887-3	November 3, 2020	978-1-64-659790-1
Marriages 13–16
5	July 13, 2020	978-4-06-520154-1; 978-4-06-520175-6 (SE)	February 2, 2021	978-1-64-659944-8
Marriages 17–20
6	November 13, 2020	978-4-06-521400-8	April 6, 2021	978-1-63-699040-8
Marriages 21–24
7	April 13, 2021	978-4-06-522957-6	September 21, 2021	978-1-63-699367-6
Marriages 25–28
8	August 12, 2021	978-4-06-524391-6	February 15, 2022	978-1-63-699620-2
Marriages 29–32
9	November 12, 2021	978-4-06-525921-4	April 19, 2022	978-1-68-491129-5
Marriages 33–36
10	July 13, 2022	978-4-06-528389-9	November 15, 2022	978-1-68-491549-1
Marriages 37–40
11	November 11, 2022	978-4-06-529688-2	April 18, 2023	978-1-68-491895-9
Marriages 41–44
12	April 13, 2023	978-4-06-531302-2	September 19, 2023	979-8-88-933151-3
Marriages 45–48
13	August 10, 2023	978-4-06-532650-3	February 20, 2024	979-8-88-933378-4
Marriages 49–52
14	February 13, 2024	978-4-06-534604-4	July 16, 2024	979-8-88-933625-9
Marriages 53–56
15	November 13, 2024	978-4-06-537591-4	March 11, 2025	979-8-89-478430-4
Marriages 57–60
16	July 11, 2025	978-4-06-540067-8	December 30, 2025	979-8-89-478811-1
Marriages 61–64

==== Our Fake Marriage: Rosé ====
No.	Original release date	Original ISBN	North American release date	North American ISBN
1	November 12, 2021	978-4-06-515503-5	May 24, 2022	978-1-68-491199-8
Marriages 1–4
2	June 13, 2022	978-4-06-528388-2	November 29, 2022	978-1-68-491567-5
Marriages 5–8; Special side story
3	August 10, 2023	978-4-06-532651-0	January 2, 2024	979-8-88-933320-3
Marriages 9–12
4	July 11, 2025	978-4-06-540068-5	January 27, 2026	979-8-89-478845-6
Marriages 13–16

=== Drama ===
In June 2023, a live-action television drama adaptation was announced. The drama was directed by Kento Yamaguchi and Mahito Kimura, with scripts written by Naomi Hiruta, music composed by Yuji Iwamoto, and starred Fuma Kikuchi and Neru Nagahama in lead roles. Twelve episodes were aired on Kansai TV and Fuji TV from July 11 to September 26, 2023.

== Reception ==
By April 2024, the series had over 5 million copies in circulation.
