= Harlem Beat =

Japanese manga series

- First tankōbon volume cover, featuring Tōru Naruse
- Genre: Sports
- Manga
- Written by: Yuriko Nishiyama
- Published by: Kodansha
- English publisher: NA: Tokyopop
- Magazine: Weekly Shōnen Magazine
- Original run: 1994 – 2000
- Volumes: 29

Harlem Beat is a Japanese manga series created by Yuriko Nishiyama. It details the struggles of young Nate Torres to go from a benchwarmer to a street-ball player. The story's scope expands as he makes friends and eventually becomes a member of his high school basketball team. It was compiled into 29 tankōbon volumes.

In North America, it was published by Tokyopop. The manga goes up to 9 volumes under the name Harlem Beat, while what were volumes 12+ in Japan were published under the series title Rebound, with the Rebound volumes renumbered beginning at 1. As of August 31, 2009, the Rebound volumes are out of print. The Japanese Harlem Beat Volumes 10 and 11 were never translated by Mixx/Tokyopop.

Jason Thompson stated that it was the author's "most popular manga". According to Thompson the work "assumes that the reader knows basketball."

== Creation and conception ==
Initially Nishiyama planned for the series to be only about street basketball, but later added a school-based team.

Nishiyama had made multiple submissions to show her editors that she had the aptitude to maintain a manga series in a weekly magazine. She stated that initially Harlem Beat did not sell well and that she attended meetings with her editor on how to rectify this, but that sales improved in a manner she described as a "kamikaze"; she stated that working on the manga became "overwhelming" as merchandising occurred.

== English version ==
Thompson stated it was "the first serious sports manga published in America." Some editing of nudity and self-insert references as well as changes of character names are in the English version. Thompson argued "the Americanization and changed names don't hurt the story that much".

The English publication did not include volumes 10 and 11; a summary of volumes 10 and 11 was included in Volume 12.

The English version refers to basketball players who were prominent in the 1990s.

Thompson stated this in regards to the atmosphere of the English version: "the mixing of Japanese and Western names gives it the feeling that it could take place in any big city."

== Characters ==
- Nate Torres (Tōru Naruse (成瀬 徹, Naruse Tōru) Japanese version) - main character of Harlem Beat. In the original Japanese version, the main character goes by his nickname Narucho (なるちょ) and is often associated with a monkey, serving as a mascot to the team. Nate is a perennial bench-warmer. Lacking in both coolness and talent, he is the most unlikely basketball player. But through persistence and support from his friends, Nate slowly teaches himself the art of basketball. In the process, he slowly builds up his confidence and begins to realize his dream of success on the high school basketball court. He also develops feelings for Mizzy Kusuda, an ex-classmate, but later falls for another girl named Tomomi Koizumi. His signature move in basketball is known as the airwalk. Nate incorporated many flashy moves into his game, such as his signature airwalk, evolved lay-up (double-clutch) miracle J, and his invincible lay-ups. Every single one of these skills are pulled off subconsciously, indicating a preternatural natural talent for the sport.
  - Thompson states that Nate is "a lovable, sincere little guy". Nishiyama argued that Nate was "surprisingly gloomy and worrisome" and that "in a sense,[..]reflected me the most."
- Mizzy Kusuda (Mizuki Kusuda (楠田 みずき, Kusuda Mizuki) Japanese version) - Mizuki is Nate's ex-classmate and close friend when he was in the primary school. She helps Nate succeed, teaching him the down and dirty side to street ball: no rules, no fouls, and no crying, she teaches him how to win. Eventually, she reveals to Shurman that she has been in love with him ever since she first met him under his street name, which was Shoe. Her love is not returned, however, with Shurman saying that Shoe is gone.
  - Initially Nishiyama planned for Mizzy to be attracted to Nate, with the latter becoming "increasingly more manly and cool", but after Tomomi was introduced into the story, the author revised the trajectory of the story.
- Kyle "Oz" Ozman (Kōsuke Ozaki (尾崎 浩介, Ozaki Kōsuke) Japanese version) - Kyle is a tough kid, high school drop-out with an axe to grind with everyone. But often his bark is worse than his bite. He and Nate are the only two players in the history of street hoops to ever score on the powerhouse team, 3-Slam. When they get together with Mizzy, Team Scratch is born. Oz is a hoodlum from the streets. He hangs with a rough crowd, and he brings the same attitude to the courts. Nate, his own teammate, is even scared of him. Throughout the series, Kyle has a crush on Mizzy, which eventually develops into love. He is also not very good when it comes to girls.
- Masahiro Sawamura (澤村 正博, Sawamura Masahiro) - He is also a member of Scratch. He is Naruse's best friend. Sawamura plays street basketball to earn money as he lives by himself. He likes money very much and as a result turns towards gambling. His affinity to risk explains his constant attempts to sink only the three-point shots. He stole a score from Three Men by his tricks. He is the best three-point shooter and called a "Miracle Shooter". He is not good in stamina, but he is very good at tricks. His famous nickname is Fox (Kitsune) Guy, as he is really tricky and loves gambling. He is a clever guy too. His only weaknesses are money and ghosts. In a flashback, it is revealed that Sawamura's father abandoned him and he was soon picked up by a Yakuza member named Fujita. Fujita taught him how to fight, including the ways of the streets. After Fujita was shot by one of his own, he was captured and confined, leaving Sawamura to live on his own.
- Shurman Shuji (Shūji Sakurai (桜井 修司, Sakurai Shūji)) - Shurman is considered to be a "big brother" in the Johnan team. He also secretly leads a double life as Shoe or Shu (Shuu (シュウ)), the leader of the streetball team House of Three Slam (Threemen's Hoop).
  - Ultimately Shurman makes a romantic overture to Kim Yabe.
  - Nishiyama stated that in response to people reading the series supporting the Shurman-Kim relationship, she felt "pretty surprised"; according to Nishiyama, her editor initially did not support the planned Shurman-Kim relationship, but relented after Nishiyama showed letters from readers supporting the romance in response to a scene that implied a possible romance between the two characters.
- Hiroaki Umakure (馬呉 宏明, Umakure Hiroaki) - The captain of the Johnan varsity basketball team.
- Sumisugi Kobayashi (小林 純直, Kobayashi Sumisugi) - A member of the Johnan team, Kobayashi is described by the Tokyopop website as "samurai-like." Nishiyama intended for him to someone who learns how to "open up to other people". He also is good at reading books.
- Tamotsu Suzuki - A member of the Johnan Team.
- Hijiri Imagawa (Kiyoshi Imagawa (今川 聖, Imagawa Kiyoshi)) - A member of the Johnan Team.
- Nobuyuki Saito (斉藤 伸之, Saitō Nobuyuki) - A member of the Johnan Team.
- Iwao Takakura (高倉 巌, Takakura Iwao) - A member of the Johnan Team, he is nicknamed "Gun" (ガンちゃん, Gan-chan).
- Kim Yabe (Kiriko Yabe (矢部 希理子, Yabe Kiriko)) - The manager of the Johnan team, Yabe is described by the Tokyopop website as a "kick-ass girl who doesn't take crap from anyone."
- Yuta Higa (比嘉 裕太, Higa Yūta) - Higa leads the Kyan Marine Industry High School basketball team.
- Yamahiko Kojiya (古謝 山彦, Kojiya Yamahiko) and Umihiko Kojiya (古謝 海彦, Kojiya Umihiko) - Twins who play on the Kyan team.
- Tetsuya Kemp Sugeran (Tetsuya Kenpu Zukeran (瑞慶覧 ケンプ 辰彦, Zukeran Kenpu Tetsuya)) - Sugeran, a member of Kyan, is considered to be the strong player on the team.
- Takao Tamanaha (玉那覇 貴生, Tamanaha Takao) - A member of the Kyan team, Tamanaha has long, dark hair. The Tokyopop website describes him as having "a pleasant personality."
- The Coach of the Kyan team
- Bud Okuda (Okuda (奥田) - Okuda is a writer for "Hoop Town Tokyo," which documents the streetball culture in Tokyo.
- Mr. Morita - A basketball journalist
- Masahiro Takagi (高城 政宏, Takagi Masahiro) - Takagi, the star player of the Kanakita Northern Industry High School basketball team, is considered to be a "shoo-in" for the Olympic team.
- Tomomi Koizumi (小泉 智美, Koizumi Tomomi) - A member of the Felicia Girls School team, Koizumi is a good player on the court, but is dizzy and accident-prone off of the court
- Hiroko Ikeda (池田 浩子, Ikeda Hiroko) - A teammate of Koizumi, Ikeda is described by the Tokyopop site as "far more practical" than her "daffy companion."
- Keigo Mikami (三上 圭悟, Mikami Keigo) - A point guard on the Tsukuba team, Mikami plays seriously
- Makoto Majima (真島 真琴, Majima Makoto) - Majima is a forward on the Tsukuba team
- Unohara
- Shades
- T- Rock
- Bucky

== Related products ==
There is a PlayStation game Harlem Beat: You're the One published by Konami in Japan in 1999. There are also some novels.

== Reception ==
According to Nishiyama, there were members of the public who believed Harlem Beat was "a bit too "earnest" for its own good".
