= List of series run in Monthly Afternoon =

Promotional poster for the 40th anniversary exhibition of Monthly Afternoon

Monthly Afternoon, a seinen manga anthology magazine published by Kodansha, has featured numerous series since its launch in 1986. The list is organized by decade and year of each series's first publication. It lists every single series run in the magazine, along with the author(s) of each series and its finishing date if applicable.

Note: All issue dates listed are cover dates, which are two months ahead of the actual issue release date (e.g. the inaugural issue, cover dated February 1987, was released on December 25, 1986).

== 1980s ==
=== 1987–1989 ===
Manga	First Issue	Final Issue	Manga author(s)	Notes
Kōfuku Ōdōri (幸福大通り)	February 1987	February 1987	Ryūji Mizutani (story) and Mamoru Uchiyama (art)	(Note: Moved from Morning Magnum Zōkan.)
Let It Be!	February 1987	November 1987	Gen Takamochi	
Shitsurei Shimassu! (失礼しまっす!)	February 1987	April 1987	Yasushi Hironaka (story) and Yoshitatsu Kanayama (art)	
Inaka Deka (田舎刑事)	February 1987	May 1989	Hitoshi Yuasa	
Asumi	February 1987	December 1987	Mitsuru Miura	
Kaiun Salesman Sugiyama Hitoshi-kun (開運セールスマン杉山等くん, Kaiun Sērusuman Sugiyama Hitoshi-kun)	February 1987	July 1987	Yoshimi Kurata	
Natte Chōdai Ōmono ni! (なって頂戴大物に!)	February 1987	May 1988	Kōtarō Hatakeyama	
Cantharis (カンタリス, Kantarisu)	February 1987	July 1987	Noboru Miyama	
Dorokuremon (どろくれもん)	February 1987	June 1987	Tadayoshi Murao	
Ano Musume wa Indian Pepper! (あの娘はインディアン・ペッパー!, Ano Musume wa Indian Peppā!)	February 1987	April 1987	Shinsuke Kudō	
Bōken! Victoria-gō!! (冒険! ヴィクトリア号!!, Bōken! Vikutoria-gō!!)	February 1987	November 1987	Masashi Tanaka	
Maharaja Biyori (マハラジャ日和)	February 1987	May 1988	Kazu Yuzuki	
Lyrics (リリックス, Ririkkusu)	February 1987	May 1989	Masayuki Mori	
Ishmael: Chikyū Hyōkai Jiki (イシュメル =地球氷解事紀=, Ishumeru: Chikyū Hyōkai Jiki)	March 1987	January 1988	Jiro Taniguchi	(Note: Transferred to Morning.)
Boku wa Muko Yōshi (僕はムコ養子)	May 1987	August 1993	Yumeno Kazuko	
Let It Roll	May 1987	September 1987	Atsushi Kamijo	
Sen Tō Chitai (戦湯地帯)	June 1987	September 1987	Yoshiyuki Iwamoto	
Taxi Driver (TAXIドライバー, Takushii Doraibā)	July 1987	April 1988	U-Jin (art) and Yang Sok-il (original story)	
Usagi (兎~うさぎ~)	August 1987	August 1988	Satosumi Takaguchi	
Buta Inu (ぶたいぬ)	September 1987	April 1988	Kei Sadayasu	
Kore kara (これから)	October 1987	January 1988	Yoshimi Kurata	
Oo! Okuda-kun Daijōbu (おっ! 奥田くんだいじょうぶ)	November 1987	January 1989	Hirō Nakata	(Note: Originally published as a one-shot in the August 1987 issue, after it won the Grand Prize in the Summer 1987 Afternoon Shiki Shō.)
Poco Poco	December 1987	May 1988	Yūnagi Shishitō	(Note: Won the Shiki Prize in the Autumn 1987 Afternoon Shiki Shō.)
Appare, Sakurada! (天晴れ、桜田!)	February 1988	April 1990	Hideo Iura	
Ganbare! Animals (がんばれ! アニマルズ, Ganbare! Animaruzu)	May 1988	January 1989	Naotaka Taki (story) and Eiji Ohara (art)	
Hometown (ホームタウン, Hōmutaun)	May 1988	August 1988	Toshiharu Koike	(Note: Won the Grand Prize in the Spring 1988 Afternoon Shiki Shō.)
Momo Tarō (momo太郎)	May 1988	May 1990	Yasushi Hironaka (story) and Mamoru Uchiyama (art)	
Tsurezure Naruga Punk (つれづれなるがパンク, Tsurezure Naruga Panku)	July 1988	March 1989	Yūichirō Sueda	
Tokyo Fudosan Kids (東京不動産キッズ, Tōkyō Fudōsan Kizzu)	July 1988	March 1989	Narumi Sugimoto (story) and Kenji Kamikado (art)	
Ei-chan (永ちゃん)	August 1988	May 1989	Seiki Tsuchida	
Basara (バサラ)	September 1988	June 1989	Yoshihiko Funazaki (story) and Akihiro Kusano (art)	
Golden Sports Times	October 1988	February 1990	Kyō Kurita (story) and Toshiaki Mori (art)	
Oh My Goddess! (ああっ女神さまっ, Aa Megami-sama)	November 1988	June 2014	Kōsuke Fujishima	
Rental (レンタル, Rentaru)	December 1988	May 1989	Yoshinobu Yamaguchi	(Note: Won the Shiki Prize in the Summer 1988 Afternoon Shiki Shō.)
Kū o Kiru (空を斬る)	January 1989	June 1989	Norifusa Mita	
Sweet Dreams	February 1989	July 1989	Reiji Yamada	
Sharin (車輪)	March 1989	November 1989	Isana Don	
Mugen-kan yo Eien ni (無限館よ永遠に)	April 1989	January 1990	Tsukasa Maekawa	
Tackle Beat (タックルBEAT, Takkuru Biito)	June 1989	January 1990	Seiki Tsuchida	
Captain Alice (キャプテンアリス, Kyaputen Arisu)	June 1989	October 1990	Namie Iwao	
Kangaeru Samurai (考える侍)	June 1989	June 1990	Yoshihiro Yamada	
Tenka Gomen Nasai! (天下御免なさい!)	June 1989	July 1989	Yūichirō Sueda	
Dakishimete yo Hidejirō (抱きしめてよ秀次郎)	July 1989	November 1989	Kōtarō Hatakeyama	
Flash	July 1989	October 1990	Masashi Tanaka	
Sueda Daigaku (スエダ大学)	August 1989	February 1990	Yūichirō Sueda	
Hiyoko-san Team! (ひよこさんチーム!, Hiyoko-san Chiimu!)	August 1989	April 1990	Ugonomika	
8-gatsu no Hikari (8月の光)	September 1989	July 1990	Hideki Arai	(Note: Won the Grand Prize in the Summer 1989 Afternoon Shiki Shō.)
Liza (ライザ, Raiza)	December 1989	April 1991	Kazumi Kakizaki	

== 1990s ==
=== 1990–1994 ===
Manga	First Issue	Final Issue	Manga author(s)	Notes
Parasyte (寄生獣, Kiseijū)	January 1990	February 1995	Hitoshi Iwaaki	(Note: Moved from Morning Open Zōkan.)
Spirit of Wonder	January 1990	January 1995	Kenji Tsuruta	(Note: Moved from Morning.)
Monsterland	January 1990	April 1990	F. Anderson Jr.	
Wagaya no Sasae (我が家のささえ)	February 1990	September 1993	Makoto Tanaka	
Pika☆Pika☆	February 1990	October 1990	Kiyumi Nakano	
Flextime (フレックスタイム, Furekkusutaimu)	February 1990	August 1990	Masaaki Nakayama	
OL Thunder (OLサンダー, OL Sandā)	March 1990	February 1991	Gō Denkōsekka	
Compiler (コンパイラ, Konpaira)	May 1990	October 1992	Kia Asamiya	
Gain	May 1990	July 1990	Gonta	
Sapporo Kansetsu Kids (サ・ッ・ポ・ロ・関・節・キ・ッ・ズ, Sapporo Kansetsu Kizzu)	July 1990	March 1991	Fukuhiro Mitsukuni	
Heaven	August 1990	March 1992	Gonta	
Samurai Dai Bōken (侍大冒険)	November 1990	May 1991	Masashi Tanaka	
Panic Kiss (パニックキッス, Panikku Kissu)	December 1990	July 1991	Namie Iwao	
Gunsmith Cats	February 1991	June 1997	Kenichi Sonoda	
Noboru-kun-tachi (のぼるくんたち)	March 1991	September 1993	Mikio Igarashi	
Kyokō Taishitsu (虚構体質)	March 1991	November 1991	Tetsuaki Minami	
Ryūko (龍子)	June 1991	December 1991	Kazumi Kakizaki	
Modern Story (モダンストーリー, Modan Sutōrii)	June 1991	November 1991	Mihiro	
Chiteki Boxer (知的ボクサー, Chiteki Bokusā)	August 1991	January 1992	Masayuki Taguchi	
Yoru no Kinniku (夜の筋肉)	August 1991	December 1991	Hitoshi Fujisaki	
Magical Super Asia (深く美しきアジア, Fukaku Utsukushiki Ajia)	February 1992	August 1994	Chen Uen	
Discommunication (ディスコミュニケーション, Disukomyunikēshon) (Note: Published in three separate parts: Discommunication (ディスコミュニケーション, Disukomyunikēshon) (February 1992–March 1999 issues); Discommunication: Gakuenhen (ディスコミュニケーション 学園編, Disukomyunikēshon: Gakuen-hen) (October 1996–March 1997 issues); Discommunication: Seireihen (ディスコミュニケーション 精霊編, Disukomyunikēshon: Seirei-hen) (July 1999–November 2000 issues))	February 1992	November 2000	Riichi Ueshiba	
Paradise Lady (パラダイス・レディー, Paradaisu Redii)	February 1992	January 1993	Kazumi Kakizaki	
Single Action Army	February 1992	January 1993	Sin-ichi Hiromoto	
Mamijiro Chō (眉白町)	February 1992	September 1992	Shinao Shiina	(Note: Originally published as a one-shot in the January 1992 issue, after it won the Grand Prize in the Autumn 1991 Afternoon Shiki Shō.)
Doktor Nonbe (ドクトル・ノンベ, Dokutoru Nonbe)	March 1992	December 1993	Tohoru Nakahara	(Note: Moved from Morning.)
Bluemint Hotel (ブルーミント・ホテル, Burūminto Hoteru)	March 1992	January 1994	Hiroshi Oda	(Note: Titled Mishiranu Fushigi (見知らぬ不思議) until the July 1992 issue.)
Chinese Angel Company (チャイニーズ・エンゼル・カンパニー, Chainiizu Enzeru Kanpanii)	April 1992	November 1992	Gen Takamochi	
Jigoku no Ie (地獄の家)	April 1992	May 1994	Gonta	
An Equation of Life (人生の方程式, Jinsei no Hōteishiki)	April 1992	January 1993	Dennis Yee (story) and Chūya Sotofuji (art)	
Hell Madonna (ヘルマドンナ, Heru Madonna)	May 1992	December 1992	Kiyoshi Haraguchi	(Note: Moved from Morning Party Zōkan.)
Wahhaman (ワッハマン)	May 1992	April 1999	Yoshitoh Asari	
Yoshie-san (よしえサン)	May 1992	July 2000	Hiroyuki Sugahara	
Naniwa Bojō (なにわ慕情)	May 1992	February 1994	Naohiro Oka	
Suzuki (スズキ)	May 1992	March 2003	Yūichi Yasui	
BiO-MANGA	May 1992	February 1993	Azuchi Umeo	
Dr. Kishiwada's Scientific Affection (岸和田博士の科学的愛情, Kishiwada Hakase no Kagaku Teki Aijō)	June 1992	August 1998	Tony Takezaki	
Bikids! (バイキッズ!, Baikizzu!)	June 1992	April 1993	Tokio Kamizuka	
Aa! Yūtenji-ke (嗚呼! 祐天寺家)	July 1992	July 1993	Yū Azuki	(Note: Moved from Morning Party Zōkan. Transferred to Morning.)
Winghalf (ウィングハーフ, Winguhāfu)	August 1992	September 1993	Namie Iwao	
Koala no Arako (コアラのアラコ, Koara no Arako)	September 1992	January 1993	Kyoko Shigehisa	
Tensui (天水)	October 1992	December 1994	Kazuichi Hanawa	
Pugi Ponmari (プギ・ポンマリ)	October 1992	August 1997	Yū Nomoto	
Deka-san (デカさん)	October 1992	April 1993	Kyozo Hase	
Ice Blade (地雷震, Jiraishin)	November 1992	January 2000	Tsutomu Takahashi	
Assembler 0X (アセンブラ0X, Asenbura Zero Ekkusu)	December 1992	August 1995	Kia Asamiya	
Heart of the Robo Crab (カニロボの気持ち, Kanirobo no Kimochi)	December 1992	August 1993	Anthony Zierhut	
Tsuchi o Kurau (土を喰らう)	December 1992	October 1993	Yoshio Mukainakano	
Redman (れっどまん, Reddoman)	January 1993	July 1993	Yoshiki Shibata	
A Diffusion Disease (拡散, Kakusan)	January 1993	March 1998	Hideji Oda	
Benkei (弁慶)	February 1993	July 1993	Sin-ichi Hiromoto	
Tsuyoshi Motto Shikkari Shinasai (ツヨシもっとしっかりしなさい)	February 1993	November 1994	Kiyoshi Nagamatsu	
Tranquilizer (鍍乱綺羅威挫婀(トランキライザア), Torankiraizā)	February 1993	June 1994	Kenji Sawada	
Small Man Big Mouth (スモールマンビッグマウス, Sumōru Man Biggu Mausu)	February 1993	July 1993	Daigo Kusuoka	
Kabel Imagines	February 1993	April 1996	Beneyto (Note: Full name Juan Carlos Beneyto Pérez.)	
H.I.L.D. Jeremy (H.I.L.D.ジェレミィ, Jeremii Hairudo)	February 1993	March 1996	Kenji Kikuchi	
Gogo 3-ji no Mahō (午後3時の魔法)	March 1993	March 1999	Narumi Kakinouchi	
Po+Go	March 1993	June 1994	Moreno	
Sakaba Mimosa (酒場ミモザ)	April 1993	November 1996	Tomoko Toda	(Note: Originally published as a one-shot in the November 1992 issue, after it won the Shiki Prize in the Summer 1992 Afternoon Shiki Shō.)
Garia Nikki (ガリア日記)	April 1993	October 1993	Sen Inoue	
Party Joke (パーティジョ~ク, Pāti Joku)	May 1993	September 1997	Ryoko Miyamoto	
Kami no Ude (神の腕)	June 1993	March 1994	Brocal Remohí	
Yōsei Jiken (妖精事件)	June 1993	September 1999	Yun Kōga	
Love Machine Guns (ラブマシンガンズ, Rabu Mashin Ganzu)	June 1993	September 1993	Kyozo Hase	
Ikkyū (あっかんべェ一休, Akkanbe Ikkyū)	July 1993	January 1996	Hisashi Sakaguchi	
Boku wa Otōto (ぼくはおとうと)	August 1993	September 1994	Shinji Ohara	(Note: Originally published as a one-shot in the May 1993 issue, after it won the Grand Prize in the Spring 1993 Afternoon Shiki Shō.)
Sora ni Naru Ao (空になる青)	August 1993	June 1996	Sei Akiyama	
La Mouche (ラ・ムッシュ, Ra Musshu)	August 1993	February 1994	Lewis	
Kōmitsudo Tako Manga (高密度タコ漫画)	August 1993	July 1996	Akiko Kurikawa	
Dominator (ドミネーター, Dominētā)	September 1993	July 1994	Tony Luke (original work, art) and Alan Grant (story)	
Loud no Kaijin (ラウドの怪人, Raudo no Kaijin)	September 1993	April 1994	Yasunari Iwafuchi	
Box	September 1993	September 1996	Ryūsei Tanaka	
Iroke Shokudō (いろけ食堂)	September 1993	September 1995	Ittoku Hayashi (Note: Real name Mikako Hayashi.)	
Guruguru (ぐるぐる)	September 1993	March 1997	Fukusuke Morita	(Note: Won the Honorable Mention in the Summer 1993 Afternoon Shiki Shō.)
Chiisana Kyojin (小さな巨人)	October 1993	April 1995	Baron Yoshimoto	
Blue Garden (ブルーガーデン, Burū Gāden)	October 1993	July 1994	Abyukyo	
Sukatan Yarō (スカタン野郎)	October 1993	April 1997	Masayuki Kitamichi	
Junk	November 1993	July 1994	Jūgatsu Toi (original story) and Tetsumi Tokō (art)	
Seraphic Feather (セラフィック・フェザー, Serafikku Fezā)	November 1993	August 2008	Yo Morimoto, Toshiya Takeda (story) and Hiroyuki Utatane (art)	
Police Chief Miriam (警察署長ミリアム, Keisatsusho-chō Miriamu)	January 1994	December 1995	Takahiko Kōya	
Kibakurō (キバクロウ)	January 1994	July 1995	Keita Amemiya	
Geretsu Tengoku (下劣天国)	January 1994	February 1995	Ichiro Nakamori	
Blade of the Immortal (無限の住人, Mugen no Jūnin)	February 1994	February 2013	Hiroaki Samura	(Note: Originally published as a one-shot in the August 1993 issue, after it won the Grand Prize in the Summer 1993 Afternoon Shiki Shō.)
Yugo (勇午, Yūgo)	February 1994	September 2004	Shinji Makari (story) and Shū Akana (art)	(Note: Transferred to Evening.)
Wiseman (ワイズマン, Waizuman)	March 1994	September 1995	Masaya Hokazono	
Yasuko no Taiyō (やす子の太陽)	April 1994	October 1998	Akira Yamaura	
Guardian Angel (ガーディアン・エンジェル, Gādian Enjeru)	April 1994	August 1994	Nancy (Note: Full name Nancy Meshkoff.)	
A.A.Lady	May 1994	September 1994	Dennis Francis (story) and Ken Matoba (art)	
Sonna Yatsu a Inē!! (そんな奴ァいねぇ!!)	June 1994	December 2009	Yū Komai	
Hanashippanashi (はなしっぱなし)	July 1994	August 1996	Daisuke Igarashi	(Note: Originally published as a one-shot in the February 1994 issue titled Obayashi ga Kikoeru Hi (お囃子が聞こえる日), after it won the Grand Prize in the Winter 1993 Afternoon Shiki Shō.)
Aqua	August 1994	June 1995	Kazuhiko Tsuzuki	
Embryo (エンブリヲ, Enburiwo)	August 1994	January 1996	Kōshin Ogawa	
Yōsai Gakuen (要塞学園)	September 1994	July 1997	Takeshi Narumi (story) and Sin-ichi Hiromoto (art)	
Sorimachi-kun ni wa Kanojo ga Inai (反町くんには彼女がいない)	September 1994	July 1998	Tasuku Yukawa	(Note: Won the Shiki Prize in the Summer 1994 Afternoon Shiki Shō.)
Yokohama Kaidashi Kikou (ヨコハマ買い出し紀行)	September 1994	April 2006	Hitoshi Ashinano	(Note: Originally published as a one-shot in the June 1994 issue, after it won the Shiki Prize in the Spring 1994 Afternoon Shiki Shō. A six-page postscript episode, titled "Pass" (峠, Tōge), was published in the July 2006 issue.)
Geijutsu Gekijō (げ~術劇場)	September 1994	January 1999	Satoshi Gēda	
Dai Nippon Tengu-tō Ekotoba (大日本天狗党絵詞)	October 1994	January 1997	Iou Kuroda	
Imaginary Magnitude (空想の大きさ, Kūsō no Ōki-sa)	October 1994	August 1997	Jon J Muth (art) and John Kuramoto (story)	

=== 1995–1999 ===
Manga	First Issue	Final Issue	Manga author(s)	Notes
Inchiki (いんちき)	February 1995	March 1999	Isao Narubito	(Note: Originally published as a one-shot in the December 1994 issue, after it won the Shiki Prize in the Autumn 1994 Afternoon Shiki Shō.)
Chronowar (電夢時空, Denmu Jikū)	February 1995	March 1995	Kazumasa Takayama	
Dragon War (ドラゴン・ウォー, Doragon Wō)	March 1995	October 1995	Espino	
Blue World (ブルー・ワールド, Burū Wārudo)	April 1995	October 1997	Yukinobu Hoshino	
Amiyoshi Gekijō (網吉劇場)	April 1995	March 1996	Ippon Kameya	
Calm Breaker (カームブレイカー, Kāmu Bureikā)	May 1995	August 1998	Iwase Masatsugu	(Note: Originally published as a one-shot in the February 1995 issue, after it won the Shiki Prize in the Autumn 1994 Afternoon Shiki Shō.)
Omega (Ω(オメガ))	June 1995	September 1997	Toshiki Inoue (story) and Tadashi Matsumori (art)	
Ryuginhōmei (龍吟鳳鳴)	July 1995	August 1996	Lee Jae-hak	
M-Stage	July 1995	December 1995	Mon-Mon	
Asia de Gohan (アジアでごはん, Ajia de Gohan)	August 1995	November 1996	Miho Tojyo	
Farm Konchū-ki (二軍(ファーム)昆虫記, Fāmu Konchū-ki)	October 1995	May 1999	Tadatoshi Mori	
The Fishbone	December 1995	August 1997	Akira Ōyama	
Hiroki Endo's Tanpenshu (遠藤浩輝短編集, Endō Hiroki Tanpenshū)	January 1996	April 1997	Hiroki Endo	(Note: Anthology of one-shot stories. Includes stories from Afternoon Season Zōkan. Two stories, "The Crows, the Girl and the Yakuza" (カラスと少女とヤクザ, Karasu to Shōjo to Yakuza) and "Because You're Definitely a Cute Girl" (きっとかわいい女の子だから, Kitto Kawaii Onnanokodakara), won the Shiki Prize for Autumn 1995 and Grand Prize for Winter 1995 in the Afternoon Shiki Shō, respectively.)
Vendémiaire no Tsubasa (ヴァンデミエールの翼, Vandemiēru no Tsubasa)	January 1996	January 1998	Mohiro Kitoh	
The Alien Teeth Man (歯男, Shinan)	February 1996	September 1996	Du Lu (Note: Real name Ye Zuo-ying.)	
Whoo?!	March 1996	July 1997	Kazuhiko Tsuzuki	
Warera no Ryūgi (我らの流儀)	March 1996	September 1997	Yuki Ōtake	
Shikidō Kachidoki (死鬼導凱歌)	April 1996	September 1997	Masanori Hama (story) and Takako Yahagi (art)	
Genomes	June 1996	May 1997	Keiko Aramaki	(Note: Originally published as a one-shot in the September 1994 and May 1995 issues, after it won the Grand Prize in the Summer 1994 Afternoon Shiki Shō.)
Inugami (犬神)	September 1996	October 2002	Masaya Hokazono	
Sumire Gahō (菫画報)	October 1996	June 1999	Shinji Ohara	
Genzō Hitogata Kiwa (幻蔵人形鬼話)	October 1996	June 2004	Yuzo Takada	
Hayako Sake Michi o Iku (ハヤ子サケ道をいく)	November 1996	August 1997	Toshihite Tamagawa	
Eikō-kan Satsujin Jiken (栄光館殺人事件)	December 1996	January 1997	Gorō Aoki (story) and Kōshin Ogawa (art)	
Famiresu-tai (ファミレス隊)	January 1997	November 1997	Rietarō	
Blame!	March 1997	September 2003	Tsutomu Nihei	(Note: Originally published as a prototype one-shot in the October 1995 issue titled Blame, after it won the Jiro Taniguchi Special Jury Prize in the Summer 1995 Afternoon Shiki Shō.)
Kamen Tenshi (仮面天使)	April 1997	February 2000	Shōhei Wakana	(Note: Originally published as a one-shot in the December 1996 issue, after it won the Shiki Prize in the Autumn 1996 Afternoon Shiki Shō.)
Shin Kubidai Hikiukenin (新 首代引受人)	April 1997	May 2001	Hiroshi Hirata	
Kami-Kaze (神・風)	May 1997	March 2003	Satoshi Shiki	(Note: Epilogue chapter published in the April 2003 issue.)
Sukatan Paradise (スカタン天国(パラダイス), Sukatan Paradaisu)	May 1997	September 1999	Masayuki Kitamichi	
Echigo Arakawa-dō Yobanashi (越後荒川堂夜話)	June 1997	July 2000	Kazumichi Ishizaka	
Yoga no Princess: Pretty Yoga (ヨガのプリンセス プリティーヨーガ, Yoga no Purinsesu: Puritii Yōga)	June 1997	May 1998	Seigi Inatome	(Note: Originally published as a one-shot in the September 1996 issue, after it won Runner-up for the Jiro Taniguchi Special Jury Prize in the Summer 1996 Afternoon Shiki Shō.)
Kotō-kan Satsujin Jiken (孤島館殺人事件)	August 1997	October 1997	Gorō Aoki (story) and Kōshin Ogawa (art)	
Cannon God Exaxxion (砲神エグザクソン, Hōjin Eguzakuson)	October 1997	July 2004	Kenichi Sonoda	
G-Gumi no-G (G組のG)	October 1997	March 1999	Emon Shin	(Note: Published in the margins.)
Hime (ヒメ HIME)	October 1997	July 1998	Takami Akai	
Eden: It's an Endless World!	November 1997	August 2008	Hiroki Endo	
The 4th Grade (四年生, Yonensei)	December 1997	May 1998	Shimoku Kio	
Ganapa no Te (ガナパの手)	December 1997	May 1999	Keita Amemiya	
Aiten Myōō Monogatari (愛天明王物語)	January 1998	June 1999	Ryūsuke Mita	
Shadow Star (なるたる, Narutaru)	May 1998	December 2003	Mohiro Kitoh	
From Kobe (神戸在住, Kōbe Zaijū)	June 1998	May 2006	Kon Kimura	(Note: Won the Shiki Prize in the Winter 1997 Afternoon Shiki Shō.)
The 5th Grade (五年生, Gonensei)	July 1998	January 2001	Shimoku Kio	
Denmu Jikū 2: Runner (電夢時空2 RUNNER)	September 1998	April 1999	Kazumasa Takayama	
Fūrinkazan (風林火嶄)	October 1998	February 2001	Masashi Ogawa	
Nā Game o Yarō janai ka!! (なぁゲームをやろうじゃないか!!, Nā Gēmu o Yarō janai ka!!)	November 1998	February 2002	Tamakichi Sakura	
G-Gumi no-G (G組のG)	April 1999	October 2005	Emon Shin	
Niraikanai (ニライカナイ)	May 1999	January 2003	Megumu Okada	
Space Combat Forward (フォワード, Fowādo)	May 1999	August 1999	Kazuhisa Kondo	
Space Family Carlvinson (宇宙家族カールビンソン, Uchū Kazoku Kārubinson)	June 1999	March 2000	Yoshitoh Asari	
Hato no Oyome-san (ハトのおよめさん)	September 1999	December 2012	Haguki	
The Son of the Dawn (暁の息子, Akatsuki no Musuko)	October 1999	February 2000	Natsumi Itsuki	
Joker (女禍JOKER, Joka)	November 1999	February 2002	Kouichi Ohnishi	

== 2000s ==
=== 2000–2004 ===
Manga	First Issue	Final Issue	Manga author(s)	Notes
Nobumi no Ehon (のぶみのえほん)	January 2000	January 2001	Nobumi	
Coo's World (クーの世界, Kū no Sekai)	January 2000	January 2001	Hideji Oda	(Note: Retitled Coo's World 2 (クーの世界2) from the September 2000 issue onward.)
Pochomukin (ぽちょむきん)	February 2000	December 2002	Masayuki Kitamichi	
Kazoku no Sorekara (家族のそれから)	February 2000	May 2000	Asa Higuchi	
Milk Closet (ミルククローゼット, Miruku Kurōzetto)	March 2000	October 2001	Hitoshi Tomizawa	
The Life of Ichabod (イハーブの生活, Ihābu no Seikatsu)	April 2000	March 2002	Hiroyuki Shoji	
Smuggler (スマグラー, Sumagurā)	May 2000	August 2000	Shohei Manabe	
Angel Doll	August 2000	October 2000	Kazuhiko Tsuzuki	
Megami Chōsho (女神調書)	September 2000	December 2000	Shinji Ohara	
Ten no Kairō (天の回廊)	October 2000	October 2001	Sei Akiyama	
Nasu (茄子)	November 2000	October 2002	Iou Kuroda	
Hosōdesanjōki (細腕三畳紀)	January 2001	October 2001	Yoshitoh Asari	
Yasashii Watashi (ヤサシイワタシ)	January 2001	February 2002	Asa Higuchi	
Space Pinchy	February 2001	September 2002	Tony Takezaki	
Yume Tsukai (夢使い)	March 2001	February 2004	Riichi Ueshiba	
Midori no Mokushiroku (緑の黙示録)	March 2001	February 2003	Jirō Okazaki	
Kuma ga Yuku (くまがゆく)	March 2001	March 2004	Ataman	
Dead End	April 2001	November 2002	Shohei Manabe	
Tende Freeze! (てんでフリーズ!, Tende Furiizu!)	June 2001	May 2004	Isutoshi	
Manga Abenobashi Mahō Shōtengai (まんが アベノ橋魔法☆商店街)	September 2001	April 2003	Kenji Tsuruta	
Stone	November 2001	August 2002	Sin-ichi Hiromoto	
LuCu LuCu (るくるく, Ruku Ruku)	December 2001	May 2009	Yoshitoh Asari	
Kūdanshi (空談師)	March 2002	July 2003	Rokurō Shinofusa	
Kurano Fujin (蔵野夫人)	May 2002	February 2003	Yūko Ichijō	
Genshiken (げんしけん)	June 2002	July 2006	Shimoku Kio	
Aku 1013 (悪1013)	August 2002	June 2003	Masashi Ogawa	
Moon Lost (ムーン・ロスト, Mūn Rosuto)	November 2002	June 2004	Yukinobu Hoshino	
Bakuon Rettou (爆音列島)	December 2002	January 2013	Tsutomu Takahashi	
Little Forest (リトル・フォレスト, Ritoru Foresuto)	December 2002	July 2005	Daisuke Igarashi	
Mushishi (蟲師)	February 2003	October 2008	Yuki Urushibara	(Note: Originally published as a one-shot in the March 1999 issue, after it won the Grand Prize in the Winter 1998 Afternoon Shiki Shō. Moved from Afternoon Season Zōkan.)
Historié (ヒストリエ, Hisutorie)	March 2003	Present	Hitoshi Iwaaki	
Mokke (もっけ)	March 2003	July 2009	Takatoshi Kumakura	(Note: Moved from Afternoon Season Zōkan.)
Ai Dokusha Voice Senshuken: Tokubetsuhan (愛読者ボイス選手権 特別版, Ai Dokusha Boisu Senshuken: Tokubetsuhan)	March 2003	February 2010	Satoshi Karasuya	(Note: Published in the margins.)
Shadow Skill	April 2003	May 2014	Megumu Okada	
Nana-han: Nana-ya Chokotto Hanjō-ki (ななはん~七屋ちょこっと繁盛記~)	April 2003	November 2007	Tamami Momose	
Love-yan (ラブやん, Rabu-yan)	April 2003	July 2015	Hiroshi Tamaru	
Acony	May 2003	September 2010	Kei Toume	
Love Roma (ラブロマ, Rabu Roma)	May 2003	December 2005	Minoru Toyoda	(Note: Originally published as a one-shot in the June 2002 and January 2003 issues, after it won the Grand Prize in the Spring 2002 Afternoon Shiki Shō.)
Tokko	June 2003	April 2004	Tōru Fujisawa	
Kiss Girl	July 2003	September 2003	Hironori Ueda	(Note: Won the Tochi Ueyama Special Jury Prize in the Spring 2002 Afternoon Shiki Shō.)
Dan-dara (ダンダラ)	August 2003	December 2003	Shū Akana	
Magarobo (マゴロボ)	September 2003	May 2004	Tomii Masako	
Inu-hime-sama (犬姫様)	October 2003	April 2004	Hikaru Ninomiya	
Big Windup! (おおきく振りかぶって, Ōkiku Furikabutte)	November 2003	Present	Asa Higuchi	
Radio Head (ラヂオヘッド, Rajio Heddo)	January 2004	December 2004	Yōnosuke Naitō	
Me and the Devil Blues (俺と悪魔のブルーズ, Ore to Akuma no Burūzu)	February 2004	April 2008	Akira Hiramoto	(Note: Prologue chapter published in the January 2004 issue. Transferred to Young Magazine the 3rd.)
Color Pri (カラプリ, Karapuri)	February 2004	September 2004	Kia Asamiya	
Poo-Neko (プ~ねこ, Pu Neko)	February 2004	Present	Masayuki Kitamichi	
Kuma ga Kuru (くまがくる)	February 2004	October 2005	Ataman	
Voices of a Distant Star (ほしのこえ, Hoshi no Koe)	April 2004	February 2005	Makoto Shinkai (original work) and Sumomo Yumeka (art)	
Shion no Ō (しおんの王)	May 2004	June 2008	Masaru Katori (story) and Jiro Ando (art)	
Jinja no Susume (神社のススメ)	June 2004	August 2006	Yuki Tanaka	
Akihabara Police Station! (アキバ署!, Akibasho!)	July 2004	November 2006	Hiroshi Seo	
Lingua Franca (リンガフランカ, Ringa Furanka)	August 2004	December 2004	Maya Kashima	
Little Jumper (リトル・ジャンパー, Ritoru Janpā)	September 2004	October 2008	Yuzo Takada	
Gunsmith Cats Burst	September 2004	November 2008	Kenichi Sonoda	
Undercurrent (アンダーカレント, Andākarento)	October 2004	October 2005	Tetsuya Toyoda	
Peshi (ぺし)	November 2004	December 2007	Ari Furomae	

=== 2005–2009 ===
Manga	First Issue	Final Issue	Manga author(s)	Notes
Suzume Suzunari (すずめすずなり)	January 2005	June 2006	Haru Akiyama	
Ai Dokusha Voice Senshuken: Chō Kakudai-ban (愛読者ボイス選手権 超拡大版, Ai Dokusha Voisu Senshuken: Chō Kakudai-ban)	March 2005	February 2010	Satoshi Karasuya	
Rinshi!! Ekoda-chan (臨死!! 江古田ちゃん)	April 2005	September 2014	Yukari Takinami	(Note: Won the Grand Prize in the Winter 2004 Afternoon Shiki Shō.)
Shūsen no Lorelei (終戦のローレライ, Shūsen no Rōrerai)	April 2005	November 2007	Harutoshi Fukui (original novel), Takashi Nagasaki (story) and Takayuki Kosai (art)	
Mishi (ミシ)	April 2005	September 2005	Iou Kuroda	
Chō Shimin F (超市民F)	May 2005	May 2005	Muu Sakamoto (story) and Masami Fukushima (art)	
Gankutsuou: The Count of Monte Cristo (巌窟王, Gankutsuō)	May 2005	May 2008	Mahiro Maeda (story, art) and Yura Arihara (story)	
Hatsukanezumi no Jikan (ハツカネズミの時間)	July 2005	April 2008	Kei Toume	(Note: Moved from Morning.)
Gagagaga (ガガガガ)	August 2005	November 2007	Yutaka Yamashita	(Note: Moved from Weekly Young Magazine. Transferred to Michao!.)
Sekai no Mago (世界の孫)	October 2005	March 2008	Sabe	
Sora no Manimani (宙のまにまに)	November 2005	August 2011	Mami Kashiwabara	(Note: Epilogue chapter published in the July 2011 issue.)
3-nen G-gumi Chōshū Sensei (3年G組長州先生)	November 2005	January 2006	Emon Shin	
Vinland Saga (ヴィンランド・サガ, Vinrando Saga)	February 2006	September 2025	Makoto Yukimura	(Note: Moved from Weekly Shōnen Magazine.)
The Place Promised in Our Early Days (雲のむこう、約束の場所, Kumo no Mukō, Yakusoku no Basho)	February 2006	October 2006	Makoto Shinkai (original work) and Sumomo Yumeka (art)	
G-Gumi no-G: Mōshō-den (G組のG 猛将伝)	February 2006	July 2006	Emon Shin	
Mysterious Girlfriend X (謎の彼女X, Nazo no Kanojo Ekkusu)	May 2006	November 2014	Riichi Ueshiba	(Note: Originally published as a one-shot in the October 2004 issue.)
Nacun (ナチュン, Nachun)	August 2006	April 2010	Daisaku Tsuru	
Atarashii Asa (あたらしい朝)	September 2006	December 2010	Iou Kuroda	
Panorama Delusion (パノラマデリュージョン, Panorama Deryūjon)	October 2006	March 2008	Shinji Ohara	
Kujibiki Unbalance (くじびき♥アンバランス, Kujibiki Anbaransu)	November 2006	February 2008	Shimoku Kio (original work) and Keito Koume (art)	
Jugai (呪街)	December 2006	January 2010	Sou Soumoto	
Mimia Hime (ミミア姫)	January 2007	May 2009	Yutaka Tanaka	(Note: Originally published as a one-shot in the February 2005 issue.)
Kyo Musume (巨娘)	January 2007	September 2007	Kon Kimura	(Note: Originally published as a one-shot in the November 2004 issue. Transferred to good! Afternoon.)
Oh! Edo Rocket (大江戸ロケット, Ō Edo Roketto)	April 2007	September 2009	Kazuki Nakashima (original story) and Una Hamana (art)	
Zarigani Kachō (ザリガニ課長)	May 2007	May 2010	Kenji Sonishi	
Yoshidake no Chisuji (吉田家のちすじ)	May 2007	November 2010	Morio Nakashima	
Chinomi (チノミ)	June 2007	August 2008	Ryūta Yoshinaga	
Ganso Ylva-chan (元祖ユルヴァちゃん, Ganso Yuruva-chan)	June 2007	November 2010	Hideo Nishimoto	
Minna no Kiseki (みんなのきせき)	July 2007	March 2008	Yōnosuke Naitō	
La Réponse est dans vos rêves: Baku (学園夢探偵 獏, Gakuen Yume Tantei: Baku)	August 2007	October 2007	Maya Kashima	
Kabu no Isaki (カブのイサキ)	August 2007	January 2013	Hitoshi Ashinano	
Fancy Guy Kyatoran (ファンシーGUYきゃとらん)	November 2007	February 2010	Makoto Kubota	
Vampir (ヴァムピール, Vamupiiru)	December 2007	April 2010	Natsumi Itsuki	(Note: Originally published as a one-shot in the September 2006 issue.)
Spirit Damashii (スピリット魂, Supiritto Tamashii)	January 2008	November 2009	Kōji Akimoto	
Trial Ride (トライアルライド, Toraiaru Raido)	January 2008	July 2009	Seiji Uozumi (story) and Chieko Kobayashi (art)	(Note: Bonus chapter published in the June 2011 issue; later transferred to good! Afternoon.)
Octave (オクターヴ, Okutāvu)	March 2008	February 2011	Haru Akiyama	
Flip-Flap	March 2008	June 2008	Minoru Toyoda	
Mozuya-san Gyakujō suru (百舌谷さん逆上する)	March 2008	September 2013	Rokuro Shinofusa	
Karan (からん)	May 2008	June 2011	Kon Kimura	
Coffee Jikan (珈琲時間, Kōhii Jikan)	July 2008	December 2009	Tetsuya Toyoda	
Jigopuri (ぢごぷり)	July 2008	August 2010	Shimoku Kio	
Hacks! (ハックス!, Hakkusu!)	July 2008	June 2010	Tetsuya Imai	
Moe-tai (もえタイ)	July 2008	September 2008	Iqura Sugimoto	
Bentler Bentler (ベントラーベントラー, Bentorā Bentorā)	August 2008	May 2010	Ryōma Nomura	
Kayō Gogo Kuji (火曜午後9時)	September 2008	November 2008	Tatsuya Okado	
DoLL	September 2008	October 2009	Tatsuya Okado	
Natsu o Oboeru (夏をおぼえる)	September 2008	December 2008	Tatsuya Okado	
Sekai ni Habatake Todoroki Sensei! (世界に羽ばたけ轟先生!)	November 2008	January 2010	Norio Kambara	
Balance of Astraia (アストライアの天秤, Asutoraia no Tenbin)	January 2009	June 2011	Ichiro Takeuchi (story) and Etsushi Ogawa (art)	
Zombie Men	January 2009	March 2009	Eri Oka (story) and Takashi Kisaki (art)	
Versus! (バーサス!, Bāsasu!)	February 2009	May 2009	Yoriko Wada	
Mugen Utamaro (夢幻ウタマロ)	February 2009	May 2010	Go Nagai	
Kosumaru-kun (コス丸くん)	February 2009	April 2009	Akiyo Inokuma	
Tomodachi 100-nin Dekiru kana (友達100人できるかな)	March 2009	April 2011	Minoru Toyoda	
Imouto Days (いもうとデイズ, Imouto Deizu)	March 2009	April 2011	Yuki Tanaka	
Hishikawa-san to Neko: Guevara Series (菱川さんと猫 -ゲバラシリーズ-, Hishikawa-san to Neko: Gebara Shiriizu)	May 2009	October 2010	Moto Hagio (art) and Ako Tanaka (story)	
Yakushiji Ryōko no Kaiki Jikenbo (薬師寺涼子の怪奇事件簿) (Note: Published in four separate parts: Yakushiji Ryōko no Kaiki Jikenbo: Kiri no Hōmonsha (薬師寺涼子の怪奇事件簿 霧の訪問者) (May 2009–January 2010 issues); Yakushiji Ryōko no Kaiki Jikenbo: Suiyobi ni Goyojin (薬師寺涼子の怪奇事件簿 水妖日にご用心) (March–November 2010 issues); Yakushiji Ryōko no Kaiki Jikenbo: Jyoō Heika no Maneki Neko (薬師寺涼子の怪奇事件簿 女王陛下の招き猫) (October 2012–January 2013 issues); Yakushiji Ryōko no Kaiki Jikenbo: Makyo no Jyoō Heika (薬師寺涼子の怪奇事件簿 魔境の女王陛下) (February–November 2013 issues))	May 2009	November 2013	Yoshiki Tanaka (story) and Narumi Kakinouchi (art)	(Note: Moved from Monthly Magazine Z.)
Knights of Sidonia (シドニアの騎士, Shidonia no Kishi)	June 2009	November 2015	Tsutomu Nihei	
Bushido Sixteen (武士道シックスティーン, Bushidō Shikkusutiin)	July 2009	December 2010	Tetsuya Honda (original work) and Jiro Ando (art)	
Shōnen-shiki Shōjo (少年式少女)	October 2009	December 2010	Yoriko Wada	
Setsugetsuki (雪月記)	November 2009	February 2011	Ryōji Yamagami (story) and Shinobu Inokuma	

== 2010s ==
=== 2010–2014 ===
Manga	First Issue	Final Issue	Manga author(s)	Notes
Suiiki (水域)	January 2010	December 2010	Yuki Urushibara	
Butter!!!	February 2010	April 2013	Tomoko Yamashita	
Afuta-tera Mondō 201x: Chō Kakudai-ban (アフタ寺問答201x 超拡大版)	March 2010	February 2013	Satoshi Karasuya	(Note: Published in the margins.)
Zassō Onna (雑草女)	April 2010	November 2011	Takamichi Yamada (story) and Masashi Asaki (art)	
Dangan Teardrop (弾丸ティアドロップ, Dangan Tiadoroppu)	May 2010	May 2011	Koma Inami	
018	June 2010	January 2011	Akira Miyagawa	
5 Centimeters per Second (秒速5センチメートル, Byōsoku Go Senchimētoru)	July 2010	May 2011	Makoto Shinkai (story) and Yukiko Seike (art)	
Bullet the Wizard (ブレット・ザ・ウィザード, Buretto za Wizādo)	September 2010	February 2013	Kenichi Sonoda	
Tatakae!! Tōsan Chop (闘え!! 父さんチョップ, Tatakae!! Tōsan Choppu)	September 2010	September 2011	Kenji Sonishi	
Necrolog (ネクログ, Nekurogu)	November 2010	December 2012	Takatoshi Kumakura	
Genshiken: Second Season (げんしけん 二代目, Genshiken Nidaime)	December 2010	October 2016	Shimoku Kio	
Samurai Chichi (侍父)	December 2010	April 2012	Sokura Nishiki	
Break of Dawn (ぼくらのよあけ, Bokura no Yoake)	March 2011	December 2011	Tetsuya Imai	
Jari Ten (じゃりテン)	April 2011	April 2012	Ginkō Akai	
Icon (イコン, Ikon)	May 2011	January 2012	Ikko Tanaka	
Tenchi Meisatsu (天地明察)	June 2011	December 2015	Tow Ubukata (original story) and Ebishi Maki (art)	
Osana Guntai (幼軍隊)	August 2011	December 2012	Yūsuke Matsumoto	
Kyō no Yuiko-san (今日のユイコさん)	November 2011	June 2015	Kenshin Hidekawa	
Zerozaki Soushiki no Ningen Shiken (零崎双識の人間試験)	November 2011	August 2013	Nisio Isin (story) and Iruka Shiomiya (art)	(Note: Side story published in the October 2013 issue.)
Wandering Island (冒険エレキテ島, Bōken Erekite-tō)	November 2011	Present	Kenji Tsuruta	(Note: Moved from Manga Box AMASIA.)
Appleseed XIII (アップルシード・サーティーン, Appurushiido Sātiin)	December 2011	June 2013	Akira Miyagawa	
Hajimari no Haru (はじまりのはる)	December 2011	May 2016	Yōko Hano	(Note: First chapter published in the May 2010 issue.)
Yūsha Vog Ramba (勇者ヴォグ・ランバ, Yūsha Vogu Ranba)	January 2012	March 2013	Hajime Shōji	
Touko Yamaguchi's Interrogation (山口とう子が取り調べます。, Yamaguchi Tōko ga Torishirabemasu)	January 2012	June 2013	Morio Nakajima	
Majimena Jikan (まじめな時間)	February 2012	October 2012	Yukiko Seike	
Ten no Ketsumyaku (天の血脈)	March 2012	November 2016	Yoshikazu Yasuhiko	
Remasters! (リマスターズ!, Rimasutāzu!)	March 2012	March 2013	Asuka Miyazaki	
Gon (ゴン)	May 2012	April 2013	Masashi Tanaka	(Note: One-shot bonus chapter published in the November 2013 issue.)
Gogo no Ohanaya-san (午後のお花屋さん)	August 2012	February 2013	Masao Tomosawa	
Land of the Lustrous (宝石の国, Hōseki no Kuni)	December 2012	June 2024	Haruko Ichikawa	
Vampir Tokubetsu-hen: King and Baron+ (ヴァムピール特別編 KING AND BARON+, Vamupiiru Tokubetsu-hen: Kingu ando Baron Purasu)	December 2012	February 2014	Natsumi Itsuki	
Takunoko (たくのこ)	January 2013	June 2013	Sonohito Hanawa	
Kotatsu ya Mikan (こたつやみかん)	February 2013	June 2014	Haru Akiyama	(Note: Originally published as a one-shot in the May and June 2012 issues.)
Afternoon wa Karasuya Satoshi no Mono (アフタヌーンはカラスヤサトシのもの, Afutanūn wa Karasuya Satoshi no Mono)	March 2013	June 2016	Satoshi Karasuya	
Tōi Shokutaku (遠い食卓)	March 2013	June 2015	Naoki Ishida	(Note: Bonus chapter published in the September 2015 issue.)
Nemesis no Tsue (ネメシスの杖, Nemeshisu no Tsue)	March 2013	August 2013	Ao Akato	
Shishunki Syndrome (思春期シンドローム, Shishunki Shindorōmu)	April 2013	April 2015	Tomo Akaboshi	(Note: Won the Grand Prize in the Autumn 2012 Afternoon Shiki Shō.)
Thanatos no Shisha (タナトスの使者, Tanatosu no Shisha)	April 2013	November 2014	Jō Yoshida (story) and Shū Akana (art)	
When You Wish upon a Star (ほしにねがいを, Hoshi ni Negai o)	April 2013	July 2013	Takanori Nakagawa	
The Gods Lie (神様がうそをつく。, Kamisama ga Uso o Tsuku)	May 2013	September 2013	Kaori Ozaki	
The Garden of Words (言の葉の庭, Kotonoha no Niwa)	June 2013	December 2013	Makoto Shinkai (story) and Midori Motohashi (art)	
Mizusaki Maki: Mizu Wakusei Sai Kaihatsu Suishin Kikō (ミズサキマキ 水惑星再開発推進機構)	June 2013	March 2014	Yūsuke Yoshimoto	
Sawarenu Kami ni Tatari Nashi (さわれぬ神にたたりなし)	July 2013	April 2015	Yoake Kannuki	
Bem Hunter Sword (ベムハンター・ソード, Bemuhantā Sōdo)	July 2013	February 2015	Yukinobu Hoshino	(Note: Moved from Morning.)
Marginal Operation (マージナル・オペレーション, Mājinaru Operēshon)	July 2013	March 2021	Yuri Shibamura (original story) and Daisuke Kimura (art)	
Kinuroku (キヌ六)	August 2013	July 2014	Ryōma Nomura	
Geino Smile Biyori (芸能すまいる日和, Geinō Sumairu Biyori)	August 2013	July 2014	Nana Tōno	
A Blood of Spy (スパイの家, Supai no Ie)	September 2013	October 2015	Shinji Makari (story) and Amematsu (art)	
Fūshi Jū Ni Ka (風姿十二花)	September 2013	August 2014	Kei Toume	(Note: Poster illustration.)
Hoshino Ponko to Tōfuya Reiko (星のポン子と豆腐屋れい子)	October 2013	December 2013	Shinji Ohara (story) and Tony Takezaki (art)	
Tsuki ni Hoe Rannē (月に吠えらんねえ)	November 2013	September 2019	Yukiko Seike	
Kotonoba Drive (コトノバドライブ, Kotonoba Doraibu)	March 2014	March 2017	Hitoshi Ashinano	
Hakuba no Oyome-san (白馬のお嫁さん)	May 2014	July 2016	Hajime Shōji	
My Boy (マイボーイ, Mai Bōi)	May 2014	February 2016	Kon Kimura	
Rasenji Kake no Umi (螺旋じかけの海)	May 2014	December 2016	Reiji Nagata	
Under 3 (アンダー3, Andā Surii)	June 2014	Present	Shunji Enomoto	
Paradise Residence (パラダイスレジデンス, Paradaisu Rejidensu)	July 2014	March 2016	Kōsuke Fujishima	(Note: Moved from good! Afternoon.)
Maru-san no Snack (マルさんのスナック, Maru-san no Sunakku)	July 2014	April 2015	Iruka Shiomiya	(Note: Bonus chapter published in the July 2015 issue.)
Fragile (フラジャイル, Furajairu)	August 2014	Present	Bin Kusamizu (story) and Saburō Megumi (art)	
Wave, Listen to Me! (波よ聞いてくれ, Nami yo Kiitekure)	September 2014	Present	Hiroaki Samura	
Zerozaki Kishishiki no Ningen Knock (零崎軋識の人間ノック, Zerozaki Kishishiki no Ningen Nokku)	October 2014	November 2016	Nisio Isin (story) and Chomoran (art)	
Hanaizawa-chō Kōminkan Dayori (花井沢町公民館便り)	October 2014	August 2016	Tomoko Yamashita	

=== 2015–2019 ===
Manga	First Issue	Final Issue	Manga author(s)	Notes
Asa Hakana Yumemishi (あさはかな夢みし)	January 2015	March 2017	Yukari Takinami	
Limit of Funeral (葬送のリミット, Sōsō no Rimitto)	May 2015	October 2016	Rokuro Shinofusa	
Designs (ディザインズ, Dizainzu)	June 2015	May 2019	Daisuke Igarashi	
It's About Time to Talk About Your House (そろそろ家の話をしましょう。, Sorosoro Ie no Hanashi o Shimashō)	July 2015	June 2016	Hideo Nishimoto	
Ark of the Canaries (カナリアたちの舟, Kanaria-tachi no Fune)	August 2015	January 2016	Misaki Takamatsu	
Black-Box	August 2015	May 2019	Tsutomu Takahashi	
Vet's Egg	September 2015	March 2017	Riya Hozumi	(Note: Originally published as a one-shot in the October 2014 issue.)
Shōjo Kairo (少女回路)	November 2015	February 2018	Kimuchi Yokoyama	
Boku wa Ai o Shōmei Shiyou to Omō (ぼくは愛を証明しようと思う。)	January 2016	April 2018	Kazuki Fujisawa (original story) and Kusu Igumo (art)	
Hasshō-ku (発症区)	March 2016	October 2017	Itoman	
She and Her Cat (彼女と彼女の猫, Kanojo to Kanojo no Neko)	April 2016	July 2016	Makoto Shinkai (story) and Tsubasa Yamaguchi (art)	
In Hand: Himokura Hakase to Majime na Migiude (インハンド 紐倉博士とまじめな右腕, In Hando: Himokura Hakase to Majime na Migiude)	May 2016	July 2016	Ao Akato	
Tantei Providence: Meikyū Jiken Kaimei-roku (探偵プロビデンス 迷宮事件解明録, Tantei Purobidensu: Meikyū Jiken Kaimei-roku)	June 2016	September 2016	Sun Tonoki	
Toppu GP (トップウGP, Toppū Jiipii)	July 2016	Present	Kōsuke Fujishima	
Chiisana Koi no Yaoyorozu (小さな恋のやおよろず)	July 2016	January 2019	Chima	
Life 2: Giver/Taker (ライフ2 ギバーテイカー, Raifu Tsū: Gibāteikā)	August 2016	December 2018	Keiko Suenobu	
Kyūjō Sajiki (球場三食)	August 2016	March 2018	Yasuhiro Watanabe	
Aya-tsuki (あやつき)	September 2016	November 2017	Atarō Terada	
Seiiki Concierge (聖域コンシェルジュ, Seiiki Konsheruju)	September 2016	October 2017	Minira Suzuki	
Soft Metal Vampire (ソフトメタルヴァンパイア, Sofuto Metaru Vanpaia)	October 2016	February 2019	Hiroki Endo	
Ashiato Tantei (あしあと探偵)	November 2016	October 2017	Yuri Sonoda	
Haru to Bonkura (春と盆暗)	November 2016	February 2017	Kon Kumakura	
Boku no Class no Oda-kun wa (僕のクラスの織田くんは, Boku no Kurasu no Oda-kun wa)	November 2016	June 2017	Sotaka Akitsu	
Ogami-san Can't Keep It In (大上さん、だだ漏れです。, Ōgami-san, Dadamore desu)	December 2016	January 2020	Yu Yoshidamaru	
Seasoned Connections (あたりのキッチン!, Atari no Kitchin!)	January 2017	November 2018	Yuki Shirono	(Note: Originally published as a one-shot in the May 2016 issue.)
I Want to Hold Aono-kun so Badly I Could Die (青野くんに触りたいから死にたい, Aono-kun ni Sawaritai kara Shinitai)	February 2017	November 2025	Umi Shiina	(Note: Epilogue chapter published in the December 2025 issue.)
Miko-san wa Funiochinai (ミコさんは腑に落ちない)	February 2017	January 2018	Itsu Yellow	
Issak (イサック, Isakku)	March 2017	June 2025	Shinji Makari (story) and Double-S (art)	
Mō, Shimasenkara: Afternoon Gekiryū-hen (もう、しませんから。 ~アフタヌーン激流編~, Mō, Shimasenkara: Afutanūn Gekiryū-hen)	March 2017	February 2020	Hideo Nishimoto	
Singularity Reaches Nowhere (シンギュラリティは雲をつかむ, Shingyurariti wa Kumo o Tsukamu)	April 2017	June 2018	Toshiki Sonoda	
Bakki (魃鬼)	May 2017	April 2018	Saki Shimokawa	
Warera Contactee (我らコンタクティ, Warera Kontakuti)	May 2017	November 2017	Rui Morita	
Buggy Whip (バギーウィップ, Bagii Wippu)	June 2017	September 2018	Suguru Ōno	
Ookumo-chan Flashback (大蜘蛛ちゃんフラッシュ・バック, Ookumo-chan Furasshubakku)	July 2017	August 2020	Riichi Ueshiba	
Blue Period (ブルーピリオド, Burū Piriodo)	August 2017	Present	Tsubasa Yamaguchi	
Sittaka Brillia (しったかブリリア, Shittaka Buriria)	September 2017	July 2018	Coffee	
Yakuza Fiancé (来世は他人がいい, Raise wa Tanin ga Ii)	October 2017	Present	Asuka Konishi	
The Golden Sheep (金のひつじ, Kin no Hitsuji)	November 2017	April 2019	Kaori Ozaki	
Koi no Tsumi: Ernestine (恋の罪 -エルネスティナ-, Koi no Tsumi: Erunesutina)	December 2017	September 2019	Yoshinori Kisaragi	
Dareka and Sekai (ダレカノセカイ, Dareka no Sekai)	December 2017	December 2018	Shinji Mito	
Zen Seibutsu ni Tsugu (全生物に告ぐ)	January 2018	January 2019	Kōta Ōhira	
Heavenly Delusion (天国大魔境, Tengoku Daimakyō)	March 2018	Present	Masakazu Ishiguro	
Kaettekita Karasuya Satoshi (帰ってきたカラスヤサトシ)	March 2018	Present	Satoshi Karasuya	
Hashikko Ensemble (はしっこアンサンブル, Hashikko Ansanburu)	April 2018	March 2022	Shimoku Kio	
When a Cat Faces West (猫が西向きゃ, Neko ga Nishi Mukya)	June 2018	February 2021	Yuki Urushibara	
Gainen Dorobō (概念ドロボウ)	August 2018	September 2019	Ikko Tanaka	
Skip and Loafer (スキップとローファー, Sukippu to Rōfā)	October 2018	Present	Misaki Takamatsu	
Inui to Tatsumi: Siberia Shuppei Hishi (乾と巽 ―ザバイカル戦記―, Inui to Tatsumi: Zabaikaru Senki)	November 2018	July 2024	Yoshikazu Yasuhiko	
Oainiku-sama! (おあいにくさま!)	December 2018	September 2019	Yoshiko Kon	
Aa Shūkatsu no Megami-sama (ああっ就活の女神さまっ)	March 2019	December 2021	Uhei Aoki (story) and Kumichi Yoshizuki (art)	
Wandance (ワンダンス, Wandansu)	March 2019	Present	Coffee	
Blade of the Immortal: Bakumatsu Arc (無限の住人 ~幕末ノ章~, Mugen no Jūnin: Bakumatsu no Shō)	July 2019	July 2024	Kenji Takigawa (story), Ryū Suenobu (art) and Hiroaki Samura (collaboration)	
Human Lost (HUMAN LOST 人間失格, Hyūman Rosuto: Ningen Shikkaku)	August 2019	December 2019	Ryūsuke Takashiro	
Weathering with You (天気の子, Tenki no Ko)	September 2019	October 2020	Makoto Shinkai (original work) and Wataru Kubota (art)	
The Decagon House Murders (十角館の殺人, Jukkakukan no Satsujin)	October 2019	June 2022	Yukito Ayatsuji (story) and Hiro Kiyohara (art)	

== 2020s ==
=== 2020–2024 ===
Manga	First Issue	Final Issue	Manga author(s)	Notes
Tomodachi toshite Daisuki (友達として大好き)	March 2020	July 2021	Mikumi Yuuchi	
Mō, Shimasen Kara: Seiun Risshi-hen (もう、しませんから。 ~青雲立志編~)	March 2020	November 2023	Hideo Nishimoto	
Medalist (メダリスト, Medarisuto)	July 2020	Present	Tsurumaikada	
The Darwin Incident (ダーウィン事変, Dāwin Jihen)	August 2020	Present	Shun Umezawa	
Spotlight (スポットライト, Supottoraito)	September 2020	September 2021	Kaze Miura	
Q, Koi tte nan desu ka? (Q、恋ってなんですか?)	June 2021	April 2022	Fiok Lee	
Maō no Kikan (魔王の帰還)	June 2021	October 2021	Michi Ichiho (story) and Nori Arashiyama (art)	
Sing a Bit of Harmony (アイの歌声を聴かせて, Ai no Utagoe o Kikasete)	August 2021	September 2022	Yasuhiro Yoshiura (original story) and Megumu Maeda (art)	
Bitter End Roll (ビターエンドロール, Bitā Endo Rōru)	August 2021	December 2022	Shun Sakura	
Tengu no Daidokoro (天狗の台所)	November 2021	Present	Ai Tanaka	
Hellhound (ヘルハウンド, Heruhaundo)	August 2022	Present	Ryōji Minagawa	
Chaos Game (カオスゲーム, Kaosu Gēmu)	September 2022	August 2024	Daiki Yamazaki	
Minzoku Gakusha Akasaka Yaichirō no Jiken-bo (民俗学者 赤坂弥一郎の事件簿)	October 2022	May 2023	Richard Woo (story) and Seimu Yoshizaki (art)	
Medium: Reibai Tantei Jōtsuka Hisui (medium 霊媒探偵城塚翡翠)	November 2022	November 2023	Sako Aizawa (story) and Hiro Kiyohara (art)	
Suzume (すずめの戸締まり, Suzume no Tojimari)	December 2022	February 2024	Makoto Shinkai (story) and Denki Amashima (art)	
Saihate no Serenade (最果てのセレナード, Saihate no Serenādo)	January 2023	March 2025	Hinohiruko	
A Kingdom of Quartz (クオーツの王国, Quartz no Ōkoku)	February 2023	March 2025	Bomhat	(Note: Originally published as a prototype one-shot in the Comic Days digital service, after it won Runner-up in the Spring 2021 Afternoon Shiki Shō.)
Jigoku no Ashita (地獄のアシタ)	April 2023	June 2024	Mikumi Yuuchi	
Meimeimei Shoku Sanctuary (冥冥冥色聖域, Meimeimeishoku Seiiki)	April 2023	February 2025	Ayumu Seki	
7-nin no Nemuri Hime (7人の眠り姫, Shichinin no Nemuri Hime)	May 2023	Present	Fiok Lee	
Yamada-kun no Zawameku Jikan (山田君のざわめく時間)	August 2023	January 2024	Yuichi Nakamaru	
Mirairaifurai (ミライライフライ(未来来不来))	December 2023	Present	Ao Ameta	
When the Chameleon Flowers Bloom (どくだみの花咲くころ, Dokudami no Hanasaku Koro)	January 2024	Present	Shiho Kido	(Note: Originally published as a prototype one-shot in the December 2022 issue, after it won the Grand Prize in the Autumn 2022 Afternoon Shiki Shō.)
Furu Kara-suya Satoshi (フルカラ~スヤサトシ)	March 2024	Present	Karasuya Satoshi	
Omori	August 2024	Present	Omocat (story) and Nui Konoito (art)	
The Chronicles of Leënde (レーエンデ国物語, Rēende Kuni Monogatari)	December 2024	Present	Ray Tasaki (story), Nezu Usugumo (art) and Gg (character designs)	

=== 2025–present ===
Manga	First Issue	Final Issue	Manga author(s)	Notes
Moyashimon+ (もやしもん+)	January 2025	Present	Masayuki Ishikawa	(Note: Prologue one-shot story published in the December 2024 issue.)
Zacha's Undying Love (ザハの恋, Zaha no Koi)	February 2025	January 2026	Nori Arashiyama	
Kraken Mare	April 2025	Present	Izu (Note: Real name Guillaume Dorison.) (story) and Hagane (Note: Real name Massimo Dall'Oglio.) (art)	
Nella of the Horizon (水平線のネラ, Suiheisen no Nera)	April 2025	Present	Yuki Urushibara	
Asayake Refrain (あさやけリフレイン, Asayake Rifurein)	May 2025	Present	Hikari Matsuda	
Dig It (ディグイット, Digu Itto)	June 2025	Present	Yoshidamaru	
Manga Lover (マンガラバー, Manga Rabā)	June 2025	Present	Ko Fumimura	
Mojiponika! (モジポニカ!)	July 2025	Present	Masaki Andō	
Shingetsu no Ban ni (新月の盤に)	September 2025	Present	Akino Miyabi	
Fushichō Koroshi (不死鳥殺し)	October 2025	Present	Akira Suga	
Dead Don't Talk (でっどどんととーく, Deddo Donto Tōku)	November 2025	April 2026	Aki Kaneda	
Paris ni Saku Étoile (パリに咲くエトワール, Pari ni Saku Etowāru)	January 2026	Present	Gorō Taniguchi (original work) and Zelihan (art)	
Golden Phantom (ゴールデンファントム, Gōruden Fantomu)	April 2026	Present	Daiki Yamazaki	
PAX Kokumin Kōfuku Kanrikyoku (PAX 国民幸福管理局)	May 2026	Present	Maki Marukido	
Gyakusatsu Kigen (逆殺起源)	July 2026	Present	Yūichirō Momose (story) and Shiwasu Hoshikawa (art)	
Hyakudai Heikifu (百大兵器譜)	August 2026	Present	Ryū Suenobu	(Note: Originally published as a prototype one-shot in the September 2018 issue of good! Afternoon, after it won the Shiki Prize in the Summer 2018 Afternoon Shiki Shō.)
High School in the Clouds (雲の中の学校, Kumo no Naka no Gakkō)	November 2026	Present	Shiho Takase	

== Bibliography ==
- アフタヌーン大事典 1987~2012 (月刊アフタヌーン2012年3月号付録) [Afternoon Dictionary 1987–2012 (Monthly Afternoon March 2012 issue supplement)]. Japan: Kodansha. January 25, 2012.
