= Kyō no Yuiko-san =

Japanese manga series

- First tankōbon volume cover, featuring Yuiko Kuroki

今日のユイコさん
- Genre: Romantic comedy
- Manga
- Written by: Kenshin Hidekawa
- Published by: Kodansha
- Imprint: Afternoon KC
- Magazine: Monthly Afternoon
- Original run: September 24, 2011 – April 25, 2015
- Volumes: 5
- icon

Kyō no Yuiko-san (Japanese: 今日のユイコさん; lit. 'Today's Yuiko-san') is a Japanese manga series written and illustrated by Kenshin Hidekawa. It was serialized in Kodansha's seinen manga magazine Monthly Afternoon from September 2011 to April 2015, with its chapters collected in five tankōbon volumes.

== Plot ==
Yuiko Kuroki is a hard-edged student, being a stickler for school rules. Tomoya Tadano is a timid, ordinary student. Despite being complete opposites in personality, the two have recently fallen in love.

== Characters ==
Yuiko Kuroki (黒木 ユイコ, Kuroki Yuiko)
A high school student in love with Tomoya. Academically sharp, she is also extremely serious and stubborn, and a stickler for school rules. She tends to be a tsundere to Tomoya, though she is trying to change that, being willing to do anything for him. Her older sister is a teacher in their school, her uniform being a hand-me-down's.
Tomoya Tadano (多田野 トモヤ, Tadano Tomoya)
A high school student in love with Yuiko. He is timid and quiet, though occasionally he can stand his ground. His kindness makes him popular with the girls, often unintentionally making Yuiko jealous. While he gets decent grades, he tends to be late for class frequently.

== Publication ==
Written and illustrated by Kenshin Hidekawa, Kyō no Yuiko-san was serialized in Kodansha's seinen manga magazine Monthly Afternoon from September 24, 2011, to April 25, 2015. Kodansha collected its chapters in five tankōbon volumes, released from September 21, 2012, to June 23, 2015.

=== Volumes ===
No.	Release date	ISBN
1	September 21, 2012	978-4-06-387841-7
2	March 22, 2013	978-4-06-387876-9
3	November 22, 2013	978-4-06-387938-4
4	September 22, 2014	978-4-06-387996-4
5	June 23, 2015	978-4-06-388064-9
