= Chaos Game (manga) =

Japanese manga series

- First tankōbon volume cover, featuring Ran Suzuki

カオスゲーム (Kaosu Gēmu)
- Genre: Mystery; Supernatural; Suspense
- Manga
- Written by: Daiki Yamazaki
- Published by: Kodansha
- English publisher: Kodansha (digital)
- Imprint: Afternoon KC
- Magazine: Monthly Afternoon
- Original run: July 25, 2022 – June 25, 2024
- Volumes: 5
- icon

Chaos Game (Japanese: カオスゲーム, Hepburn: Kaosu Gēmu) is a Japanese manga series written and illustrated by Daiki Yamazaki. It was serialized in Kodansha's seinen manga magazine Monthly Afternoon from July 2022 to June 2024, with its chapters collected in five tankōbon volumes.

== Plot ==
Investigative journalist Ran Suzuki carries a strange birthmark of three circles on her abdomen. After her exposé of a corrupt politician's dealings with the yakuza are halted by her publishing company, her colleague Machida suggests she take her story to a journalist he knows, giving her their contact. Later that night, Ran and Machida are ambushed by the yakuza over the exposé. As they are taken to a warehouse to be beaten up, a man with a scarred face and three diamond markings in his eyes interrupts them, where his presence causes them all to die by pure chance—except for Machida, whom he personally kills. However, he fails to kill Ran, also by pure chance. The man asks her if she has seen God before disappearing.

Recovering from her injuries, Ran uses the contact Machida gave her to meet the freelance journalist and occult enthusiast, Kyoichi Azuma. While investigating the incident at the warehouse, Kyoichi shares an image of a diamond-shaped sigil in one of his articles, similar to the scarred man's eyes. The markings are soon revealed to be the symbol of a mysterious cult known as the Salvation Society, where its members are given the same markings on their bodies, possess supernatural abilities, and follow a God that is up against another God; one that is represented by a circular sigil like Ran's birthmark, and who has guided her to safety a number of times.

Ran and Kyoichi are now locked in a supernatural battle against the Salvation Society, where everyday accidents become intentional attempts on their lives.

== Publication ==
Written and illustrated by Daiki Yamazaki, Chaos Game was serialized in Kodansha's seinen manga magazine Monthly Afternoon from July 25, 2022, to June 25, 2024. Kodansha collected its 24 chapters in five tankōbon volumes, released from November 22, 2022, to September 20, 2024.

In September 2024, Kodansha began publishing the series in English on its K Manga digital service.

=== Volumes ===
No.	Japanese release date	Japanese ISBN
1	November 22, 2022	978-4-06-529601-1
Chapters 1–4
2	April 21, 2023	978-4-06-531328-2
Chapters 5–9
3	September 22, 2023	978-4-06-532949-8
Chapters 10–14
4	March 22, 2024	978-4-06-534837-6
Chapters 15–19
5	September 20, 2024	978-4-06-536752-0
Chapters 20–24
