= Ogami-san Can't Keep It In =

Japanese manga series

- First tankōbon volume cover, featuring Meiko Ogami (top) and Shinichiro Yaginuma (bottom)

大上さん、だだ漏れです。 (Ōgami-san, Dadamore desu)
- Genre: Coming-of-age; Erotic comedy; Romantic comedy
- Manga
- Written by: Yu Yoshidamaru
- Published by: Kodansha
- English publisher: NA: Kodansha USA
- Imprint: Afternoon KC
- Magazine: Monthly Afternoon
- Original run: October 25, 2016 – November 25, 2019
- Volumes: 7
- icon

Ogami-san Can't Keep It In (Japanese: 大上さん、だだ漏れです。, Hepburn: Ōgami-san, Dadamore desu; lit. 'Ōgami-san, It's All Leaking Out') is a Japanese manga series written and illustrated by Yu Yoshidamaru. It was serialized in Kodansha's seinen manga magazine Monthly Afternoon from October 2016 to November 2019, with its chapters collected in seven tankōbon volumes.

== Plot ==
High school student Meiko Ogami has erotic thoughts that she keeps to herself, never letting anyone see or hear what she is interested in for fear of being seen as a pervert. After a chance encounter with Shinichiro Yaginuma, a high school boy with a quiet demeanor, Ogami decides to get close to him, assuming he is a loner like her. However, Yaginuma hates being touched, and Ogami discovers why when she accidentally blurts out her lewd thoughts after giving back his towel. Yaginuma explains that whenever someone touches him, they immediately speak their true thoughts out loud. Ogami suggests he can put his unusual power to good use, offering to become his first friend. The two gain more unlikely friends with the help of Yaniguma's power over time, while their friendship grows into something more.

== Production ==
The original idea for Ogami-san Can't Keep It In was that it would be about a girl who was like a "lone wolf", constantly causing trouble for an unassertive boy who was like a "goat", hence the character names Ogami for "wolf" (狼, Ōkami), and Yaginuma for "goat" (山羊, Yagi). Author Yu Yoshidamaru thought it would be funnier if the roles were switched.

== Publication ==
Written and illustrated by Yu Yoshidamaru, Ogami-san Can't Keep It In was serialized in Kodansha's seinen manga magazine Monthly Afternoon from October 25, 2016, to November 25, 2019. Kodansha collected its chapters in seven tankōbon volumes, released from June 23, 2017, to January 23, 2020.

During their panel at Anime NYC 2022, Kodansha USA announced that it had licensed the manga, with the first volume released on October 24, 2023. The seventh and final volume was released on February 4, 2025.

=== Volumes ===
No.	Original release date	Original ISBN	English release date	English ISBN
1	June 23, 2017	978-4-06-388270-4	October 24, 2023 (digital); October 31, 2023 (print)	979-8-88933-242-8 (digital); 978-1-64651-868-5 (print)
1. "Our Disgrace" (ぼくたちの失態, Boku-tachi no Shittai); 2. "Military Date of Love" (恋のミリタリー・デート, Koi no Miritarī Dēto); 3. "TOO SHY SHY BOY!"; 4. "In My Embrace, Your Happy Trail" (君よ抱かれてギャランドゥ, Kimiyo Idakarete Gyarandu); 5. "You Were Young Back Then" (あの時君は若かった, Ano Toki Kimi wa Wakakatta); 6. "I Want to Know You Better" (きみをもっと知りたくて, Kimi o Motto Shiritakute)
2	November 22, 2017	978-4-06-510359-3	December 26, 2023	979-8-88933-391-3 (digital); 978-1-64651-869-2 (print)
7. "Goat and Boobs" (ヤギとボイン, Yagi to Boin); 8. "My Goat Pages" (ヤギ・バック・ページ, Yagi Bakku Pēji); 9. "O Friend, Why Do You" (友よ君はなぜ, Tomoyo Kimi wa Naze); 10. "Experienced One Summer" (ひと夏の経験値, Hito Natsu no Keikenchi); 11. "Who's Afraid When They're the Wolf?" (狼だから怖くない, Ōkamidakara Kowakunai)
3	April 23, 2018	978-4-06-511223-6	February 20, 2024	979-8-88933-507-8 (digital); 978-1-64651-870-8 (print)
12. "Lovely Gourdy Boy" (素敵なひょうたんボーイ, Sutekina Hyōtan Bōi); 13. "Guilt and Jealousy" (やましくてジェラシ―, Yamashikute Jerashi―); 14. "Octopus's Garden" (オクトパス・ガーデン, Okutopasu Gāden); 15. "Can't We Be Friends?" (友達でいいかな, Tomodachide Ii kana); 16. "Wild Animal Crack-Ups" (わくわく野獣ランド, Wakuwaku Yajū Rando)
4	August 23, 2018	978-4-06-512431-4	April 23, 2024	979-8-88933-552-8 (digital); 978-1-64651-871-5 (print)
17. "Special Girlfriend" (スペシャルガールフレンド, Supesharu Gārufurendo); 18. "Invincible Venus" (無敵のヴィーナス, Muteki no Vīnasu); 19. "The 'Youth: Barely Survived It' Game" (青春生殺しゲーム, Seishun Namagoroshi Gēmu); 20. "Miss Kaoru's Lullaby" (カオル嬢のララバイ, Kaoru Jō no Rarabai); 21. "I Can't Be a Wolf" (狼になれない, Ōkami ni Narenai)
5	February 22, 2019	978-4-06-514207-3	June 18, 2024	979-8-88933-644-0 (digital); 978-1-64651-872-2 (print)
22. "Mom's Eyes Are 10,000 Volts" (母のひとみは10000ボルト, Haha no Hitomi wa Ichiman Boruto); 23. "Bridge Over Troubled Udders" (明日に架ける牛, Ashita ni Kakeru Ushi); 24. "In the Blue Sky After (Sinus) Pain" (病み上がりの青空に, Yamiagari no Aozora ni); 25. "The Yellow Bouquet: Yaginuma Bangaichi" (幸福(しあわせ)の黄色い花束 ～柳沼番外地～, Shiawase no Kīroi Hanataba: Yaginuma Bangaichi); 26. "You Are More Prudent Than a Rose" (君は薔薇(ばら)より慎(つつ)ましい, Kimi wa Bara Yori Tsutsumashī); 27. "Christmas Keeps On Coming" (クリスマスが懲りずにやってくる, Kurisumasu ga Korizu ni Yattekuru)
6	June 21, 2019	978-4-06-515937-8	August 20, 2024	979-8-89478-039-9 (digital); 978-1-64651-873-9 (print)
28. "Girl Trouble!" (心配! お嬢さん, Shinpai! Ojōsan); 29. "The Not-Quite-Hateable Non-Friend" (憎みきれない友でなし, Nikumi Kirenai Tomo de Nashi); 30. "Ballad of Dad and Snow" (父と雪のバラード, Chichi to Yuki no Barādo); 31. "Meiko's Wrath is About to Explode" (芽衣子の怒りは爆発寸前, Meiko no Ikari wa Bakuhatsu Sunzen); 32. "Rage! Fight! Meiko Ogami!" (怒れ! 斗(たたか)え! 大上芽衣子, Okore! Tatakae! Ōgami Meiko)
7	January 23, 2020	978-4-06-518197-3	January 28, 2025 (digital); February 4, 2025 (print)	979-8-89478-357-4 (digital); 978-1-64651-874-6 (print)
33. "A New Idiot Has Arrived" (新しいバカが来た, Atarashī Baka ga Kita); 34. "Four Folks Alone in Jimbocho" (神(じん)保(ぼう)町(ちょう)4人ぼっち, Jinbōchō Yonri Bocchi); 35. "The Right Way to Use a Pillow" (正しい枕の使い方, Tadashī Makura no Tsukaikata); 36. "You Don't Lie with These Eyes" (君はこの瞳(め)で嘘(うそ)つかない, Kimi wa Kono Me de Uso Tsukanai); 37. "Big Disconcertion" (大困惑, Dai Konwaku); 38. "The One and Only Person in the World" (世界にひとりだけの, Sekai ni Hitori dake no)

== Reception ==
In a review of the first volume, Christopher Farris of Anime News Network commended the manga for being a "fun, good-natured tale tinged by its refreshingly frank approach", noting that despite its sexual content, it is not a "fan service" series and instead focuses on the struggles of adolescence in an "authentic, often funny take".
