= When the Chameleon Flowers Bloom =

Japanese manga series

- First tankōbon volume cover, featuring Daigo Shigaraki (left) and Shiro Kiyomizu (right)

どくだみの花咲くころ (Dokudami no Hanasaku Koro)
- Genre: Comedy; Slice of life
- Manga
- Written by: Shiho Kido
- Published by: Kodansha
- English publisher: Kodansha (digital)
- Imprint: Afternoon KC
- Magazine: Monthly Afternoon
- Original run: November 25, 2023 – present
- Volumes: 5
- icon

When the Chameleon Flowers Bloom (Japanese: どくだみの花咲くころ, Hepburn: Dokudami no Hanasaku Koro) is a Japanese manga series written and illustrated by Shiho Kido. It has been serialized in Kodansha's seinen manga magazine Monthly Afternoon since November 2023.

In 2025, the manga won the New Creator Prize of the 29th Tezuka Osamu Cultural Prize.

== Plot ==
Daigo Shigaraki is seen as an outcast at school, known for his temper tantrums and strange habits. One day during art class, model student Shiro Kiyomizu notices Shigaraki making a bizarrely creative clay sculpture, and later observes him making grass dolls of his classmates in the chameleon flower fields, including one of Kiyomizu, leaving him in awe. After the flower fields are razed and the dolls start disintegrating, a manic Kiyomizu confronts Shigaraki, offering to help motivate his creativity in any way. Despite being unsettled by Kiyomizu's obsessiveness over his art, Shigaraki accepts. From there, an unusual friendship blooms.

== Production ==
When the Chameleon Flowers Bloom originated as a doujinshi that was first written and illustrated in December 2021, before it was showcased at COMITIA 140 in May the following year. Author Shiho Kido was later contacted by the Monthly Afternoon editorial department, and submitted the work for the Autumn 2022 Afternoon Shiki Shō, where it won the Grand Prize. It was Kido's second work as a manga artist.

Kido's fascination for outsider art and "Art Brut" since high school, as well as the ambiguity of what would attract someone into such art, were what inspired the story for When the Chameleon Flowers Bloom. The main characters being in fifth grade was because Kido believed that was the last possible age kids are open-minded about others before they start becoming socially closed off during middle school and high school. Kido noted that had Shiro Kiyomizu been older, he would have been a less likeable character to work with.

Many character names were based on Japanese ceramics. Kido stated that this began from buying a Shigaraki ware vase, thinking it was a fitting name for Daigo Shigaraki, and replicating it for other characters.

== Publication ==
Written and illustrated by Shiho Kido, When the Chameleon Flowers Bloom was first published as a one-shot in Kodansha's seinen manga magazine Monthly Afternoon on October 25, 2022, after it won the Grand Prize of the Autumn 2022 Afternoon Shiki Shō (アフタヌーン四季賞; 'Afternoon Four Seasons Award'). It was also posted in its entirety on Kido's Twitter account that same day, where it was well received by readers. It later officially began serialization in Monthly Afternoon on November 25, 2023. Kodansha has collected its chapters into individual tankōbon volumes, with the first volume released on May 22, 2024. As of August 21, 2026, five volumes have been released.

In February 2025, Kodansha began publishing the series in English on its K Manga digital service.

=== Volumes ===
No.	Japanese release date	Japanese ISBN
1	May 22, 2024	978-4-06-535497-1
1. "Those Days" (あのころ, Ano Koro); 2. "Rumors" (うわさ, Uwasa); 3. "Secrets" (秘密, Himitsu); 4. "Change" (変化, Henka); 5. "Wound" (傷, Kizu)
2	December 23, 2024	978-4-06-537721-5
6. "Unexpected" (予想外, Yosō-gai); 7. "Liar" (うそつき, Uso-tsuki); Extra Story: "Report Cards" (通知表, Tsūchihyō); 8. "Words" (ことば, Kotoba); 9. "The Ocean" (海, Umi); 10. "Meetup" (待ち合わせ, Machiawase)
3	June 23, 2025	978-4-06-539728-2
11. "False Rumors" (汚名, Omei); 12. "Clearing Shigaraki's Name" (汚名返上, Omei Henjō); Extra Story: "Dagashi" (駄菓子); 13. "Typhoon" (台風, Taifū); 14. "Chain Reaction" (連鎖, Rensa); 15. "Hiking" (山登り, Yamanobori)
4	December 23, 2025	978-4-06-541730-0
16. "Outdoor Cooking" (野外炊事, Yagai Suiji); 17. "Beautiful" (きれい, Kirei); 18. "The Exchange" (代償, Daishō); 19. "Shapes" (かたち, Katachi); 20. "House" (家, Ie)
5	August 21, 2026	978-4-06-544496-2
21. "Fake" (贋作, Gansaku); Extra Story: "Ten Minutes" (10分間, Jū-Funkan); 22. "Money" (金, Kane); 23. "Hole" (穴, Ana); 24. "A Special Lesson" (特別授業, Tokubetsu Jugyō); 25. "Happiness and Unhappiness" (幸不幸, Kō Fukō)

=== Chapters not yet in tankōbon format ===
- Extra Story: "Cooking Class" (調理実習, Chōri Jisshū)
- 26. "Attachment" (執着, Shūchaku)

== Reception ==
The manga ranked second at the 3rd Late Night Manga Awards in 2024 hosted by Bungeishunjū's Crea magazine. The manga ranked third on Takarajimasha's Kono Manga ga Sugoi! list of best manga of 2025 for male readers. It was nominated for the 18th Manga Taishō in 2025 and ranked fifth with 51 points. It received the 29th annual Tezuka Osamu Cultural Prize's New Creator Prize in 2025.
