= Compiler (manga) =

Japanese manga series

- First tankōbon volume cover of Compiler, featuring Compiler

コンパイラ (Konpaira)
- Genre: Comedy; Science fiction
- Manga
- Written by: Kia Asamiya
- Published by: Kodansha
- Imprint: Afternoon KC
- Magazine: Monthly Afternoon
- Original run: March 24, 1990 – August 25, 1992
- Volumes: 3
- Manga

Assembler 0X
- Written by: Kia Asamiya
- Published by: Kodansha
- Imprint: Afternoon KC
- Magazine: Monthly Afternoon
- Original run: October 24, 1992 – June 24, 1995
- Volumes: 4
Further information
Original video animation
Directed by	Kiyoshi Murayama; Takao Kato
Produced by	Joji Furusawa; Kazuhiko Ikeguchi; Masaki Sawanobori; Yoshimasa Mizuo
Written by	Takao Kato; Kiyoshi Murayama
Music by	Toshiyuki Omori
Studio	Animate Film; Studio Fantasia
Licensed by	NA: ADV Films (expired)
Released	March 5, 1994 – October 5, 1994
Runtime	30 minutes
Episodes	2
Original video animation
Compiler Festa
Directed by	Kiyoshi Murayama
Produced by	Kōji Shimana; Masaki Sawanobori; Yoshimasa Mizuo
Written by	Michitaka Kikuchi
Music by	Toshiyuki Omori
Studio	Studio Fantasia
Licensed by	NA: ADV Films (expired)
Released	December 21, 1995
Runtime	50 minutes
Episodes	1
Manga
Ganzo Compiler
Written by	Kia Asamiya
Published by	Shōnen Gahōsha
Magazine	Young King OURs
Published	September 30, 2021
- icon

Compiler (Japanese: コンパイラ, Hepburn: Konpaira) is a Japanese manga series written and illustrated by Kia Asamiya. It was originally serialized in Kodansha's seinen manga magazine Monthly Afternoon from March 1990 to August 1992. The series follows two computer programs, Compiler and Assembler, who, after failing to take over Earth, decide to live with two human brothers while dealing with various enemies that are after them. A sequel series, titled Assembler 0X and focusing on the character Assembler, was serialized in Monthly Afternoon from October 1992 to June 1995.

The manga was adapted into a two-part anime original video animation (OVA) in 1994 by Kodansha, King Records, and Movic. It was licensed in North America by ADV Films. An OVA sequel was released in 1995.

== Plot ==
Compiler (as in a source code compiler) features two girls, Compiler and Assembler, who arrived on Earth from 2-D cyberspace to play a "game" in which they will delete the real world and reform it. However, they move in with two young men called Toshi and Nachi and lose interest in the game. After Toshi is injured and the game is cancelled, two beings called Plasma and Compiler 2 are sent in to erase the girls.

== Characters ==
Compiler (コンパイラ, Konpaira)
Voiced by: Naoko Matsui (Japanese); Kelly Manison (English)
Assembler (アセンブラ, Asenbura)
Voiced by: Yūko Mizutani (Japanese); Jessica Calvello (English)
Toshi Igarashi (五十嵐 淑, Igarashi Toshi)
Voiced by: Nozomu Sasaki (Japanese); Spike Spencer (English)
Nachi Igarashi (五十嵐 那智, Igarashi Nachi)
Voiced by: Koichi Yamadera (Japanese); Andrew Klimko (English)

== Media ==
=== Manga ===
Written and illustrated by Kia Asamiya, Compiler was serialized in Kodansha's seinen manga magazine Monthly Afternoon from March 24, 1990, (Note: Debuted in the magazine's May 1990 issue, released on March 24, 1990.) to August 25, 1992. (Note: Finished in the magazine's October 1992 issue, released on August 25, 1992.) Kodansha collected its chapters in three tankōbon volumes, released from April 23, 1991, to February 23, 1993. The series was republished in two bunkoban volumes, both released on July 10, 1999.

A sequel series by Asamiya, titled Assembler 0X (アセンブラ0X, Asenbura Zero Ekkusu) and focusing on the character Assembler who is now human, was serialized in Monthly Afternoon from October 24, 1992, (Note: Debuted in the magazine's December 1992 issue, released on October 24, 1992.) to June 24, 1995. (Note: Finished in the magazine's August 1995 issue, released on June 24, 1995.) Kodansha collected its chapters in four tankōbon volumes, released from October 23, 1993, to October 23, 1995. The series was republished in two bunkoban volumes, both released on August 6, 1999.

In May 2021, it was announced in Shōnen Gahōsha's seinen manga magazine Young King OURs that a new Compiler story by Asamiya will debut in the magazine later that year. The short story, titled Ganzo Compiler (元祖 コンパイラ, Ganzo Konpaira; lit. 'Original Compiler'), was released on September 30, 2021, in the November issue.

==== Volumes ====
No.	Release date	ISBN
1	April 23, 1991	978-4-06-314032-3
2	April 23, 1992	978-4-06-314043-9
3	February 23, 1993	978-4-06-314057-6

==== Assembler 0X volumes ====
No.	Release date	ISBN
1	October 23, 1993	978-4-06-321036-1
2	July 22, 1994	978-4-06-321041-5
3	February 23, 1995	978-4-06-321047-7
4	October 23, 1995	978-4-06-321051-4

=== Anime ===
A two-part original video animation (OVA) anime adaptation was produced by Kodansha, King Records, and Movic in 1994. It was animated by Animate Film and Studio Fantasia. The first episode was directed by Kiyoshi Murayama, and written by Takao Kato; it was released on March 5, 1994. The second episode was directed by Kato and written by Murayama; it was released on October 5, 1994. Yuji Moriyama was the character designer for both episodes. The anime was licensed in North America by ADV Films in August 1999, and was released in VHS on August 10.

An OVA sequel, titled Compiler Festa, was released on December 21, 1995. It was produced by Kodansha, King Records, and Movic, and animated by Studio Fantasia. It was directed by Murayama and written by Kia Asamiya (under his real name, Michitaka Kikuchi). Naoko Takeuchi and Yasuhiro Ōshima were the character designers. The sequel was licensed in North America by ADV Films, and was released under the title Compiler 2 in VHS on November 9, 1999.

The opening theme is "I Was Born to Fall in Love", and the end theme is "Full Up Mind", both by Masami Okui. The themes were released as a single on January 21, 1994; the full OVA soundtrack was released later that same year, on April 21. As well as the single and soundtrack, three image albums—Compiler, Assembler, and Interpreter—were also released.
