= Wandering Island =

Japanese manga series

- First tankōbon volume cover, featuring Mikura Amelia looking out of her Fairey Swordfish

冒険エレキテ島 (Bōken Erekite-tō)
- Genre: Adventure
- Manga
- Written by: Kenji Tsuruta
- Published by: Kodansha
- English publisher: NA: Dark Horse Comics
- Imprint: Afternoon KC Deluxe
- Magazine: Manga Box AMASIA; (2010); Monthly Afternoon; (2011–present)
- Original run: July 13, 2010 – present
- Volumes: 2
- icon

Wandering Island (Japanese: 冒険エレキテ島, Hepburn: Bōken Erekite-tō; lit. 'Adventure Electric Island') is a Japanese manga series written and illustrated by Kenji Tsuruta. It is about a woman who runs an air delivery service and her quest to find a moving island. It was first published as part of Kodansha's manga anthology Manga Box AMASIA in July 2010 and continued serialization in Kodansha's seinen manga magazine Monthly Afternoon in September 2011. Its latest chapter was released in October 2017. As of November 2017, two tankōbon volumes have been released. The manga has been licensed in North America by Dark Horse Comics, with the first volume being published in July 2016.

== Plot ==
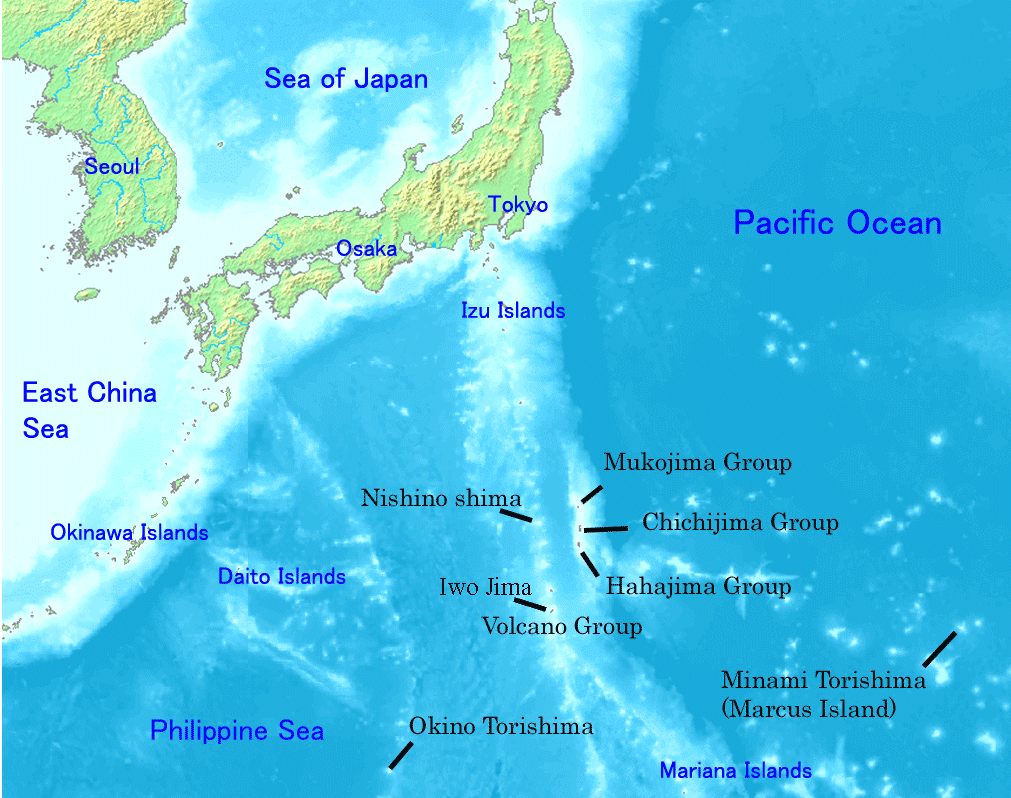
The manga takes place around the Izu and Ogasawara (labeled) archipelagos in Japan

Mikura Amelia runs an air delivery service with her grandfather in Izu Ōshima, Japan. After finding out that he has died, she discovers his journals about "Electric Island" left for her and a package for her to deliver there. The entries are written into the future and provide Mikura with instructions on how to locate the island, which doesn't have a fixed location. After three days, she manages to find the island using wave radar, but upon going in for a landing, falling debris from a burning building causes her to crash. Mikura is rescued, but the island is gone.

Mikura resolves to find Electric Island again, neglecting her sleep and deliveries to the point of losing electricity in her house. Based on the journals, she learns that the island moves around cyclically over a period of approximately three years. She also receives the notes of Ryugo, her former teacher and a geophysicist who worked with her grandfather to study the island. She believes that Ryugo, who was lost at sea in a typhoon six years ago, and her grandfather both attempted to reach Electric Island. As the day of the cycle approaches again, Mikura finds out that her cell phone from the crash was found by a dolphin, who is being tracked by a researcher. Determining that the island must have brought it back, she uses the tracking data to locate the island and prepares to set out for it.

== Themes ==
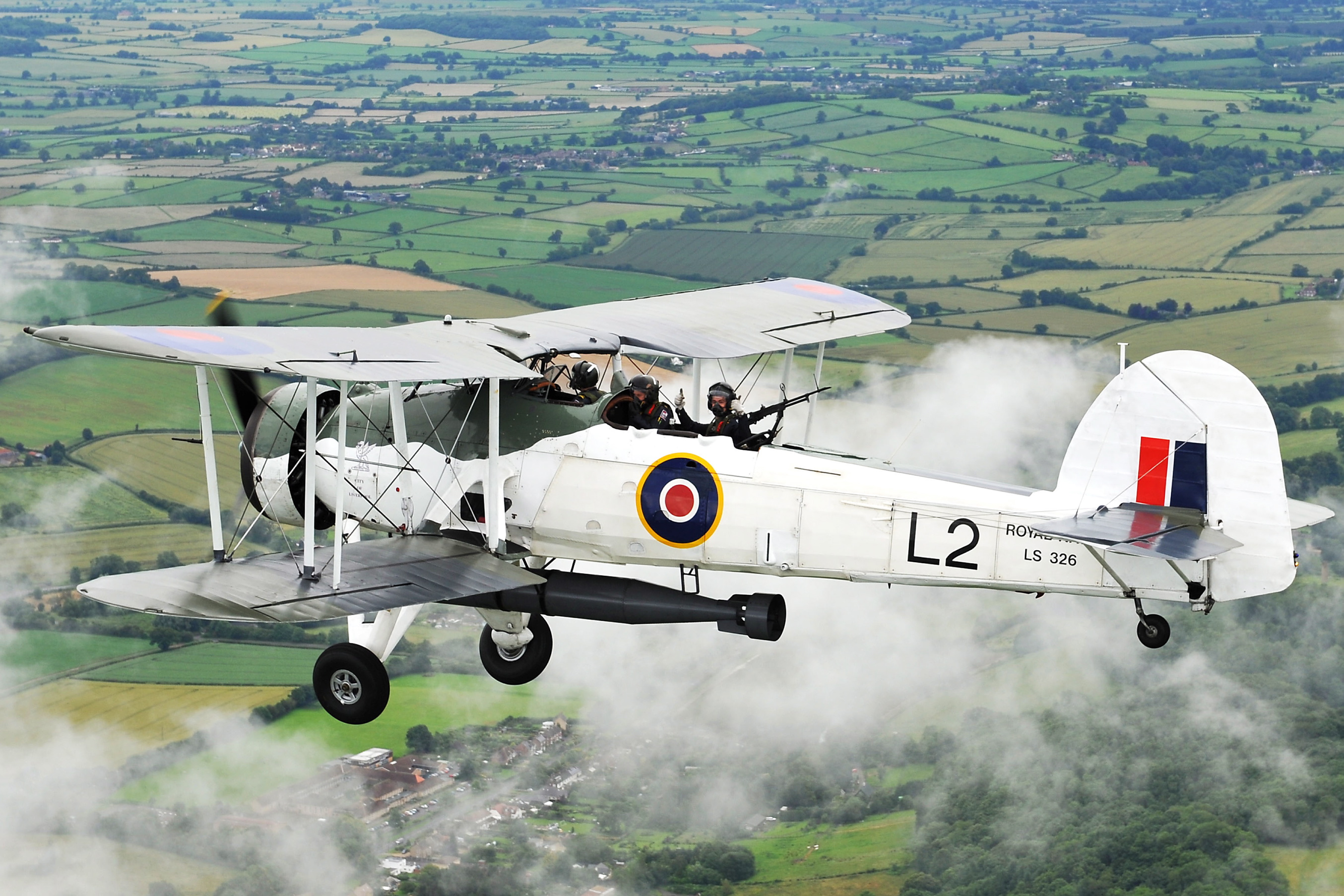
The protagonist of the manga flies a Fairey Swordfish

According to Anime News Network's Rebecca Silverman, the protagonist Mikura Amelia's cat named Endeavour is likely a reference to James Cook's ship HMS Endeavour and her family name "Amelia" a reference to Amelia Earhart. Silverman also suggests parallels between Electric Island and Shangri-La, as well as influences of Gulliver's Travels and Treasure Island on the manga.

Joe McCulloch of The Comics Journal found the combination of Mikura's "devastated mental state" and her scant attire to give the manga a voyeuristic aspect. He also detected moe (Note: McCulloch defines the term as "the aesthetic that encourages a protective attachment to young cartoon ladies".) undertones in the attitude and content of the manga, but called it a more sophisticated application than usual.

== Publication ==
The manga was first published as part of Kodansha's manga anthology Manga Box AMASIA on July 13, 2010. It began an irregular serialization in Kodansha's seinen manga magazine Monthly Afternoon on September 24, 2011. Its most recent chapter was released on October 25, 2017. Kodansha published the first collected volume (Note: The initial Amasia publication was 152 pages, while the collected volume had 192 pages.) on October 21, 2011, and the second on November 21, 2017.

In December 2015, Dark Horse Comics announced that it had licensed the manga in North America, publishing the first volume on July 26, 2016. The manga has also been published in Taiwan by Tong Li Publishing.

=== Volumes ===
No.	Original release date	Original ISBN	English release date	English ISBN
1	October 21, 2011	978-4-06-376146-7	July 13, 2016	978-1-5067-0079-3
2	November 21, 2017	978-4-06-393081-8	January 16, 2019	978-1-5067-1021-1

== Reception ==
Zainab Akhtar of The Guardian listed the manga as one of the "comics and graphic novels to look forward to in 2016". At San Diego Comic-Con 2016's "Best and Worst Manga" panel, the manga was part of the list of "Best New Manga for Grown-ups". It was nominated for the 2017 Eisner Award in the "Best U.S. Edition of International Material—Asia" category.

Silverman commended the detailed art and the believability of Mikura's island, noting that her light attire comes off as being for comfort rather than fanservice. Silverman concludes that the first volume is "the kind of book you can get lost in". Kate O'Neil of The Fandom Post noted Tsuruta's use of his intricate hand-drawn art to tell the story, describing the manga as "filled with whimsy and obsessive detail." However, O'Neil was disappointed in the cliffhanger ending, saying: "perhaps it lingers a bit too long on setting the mood because it feels like the story is just beginning as this volume ends." Shea Hennum of The A.V. Club complimented the manga's art, calling it a "beautifully drawn and precisely detailed rendering of life on the Izu and Ogasawara islands". However, Hennum found the story to be "quotidian and mundane [...] devoid of sexuality or even romance". She concludes that the juxtaposition of this innocence with Tsuruta's fanservice leads to a mismatch in tone, resulting in a bemusing experience. McCulloch compared Tsuruta's art to Hiroaki Samura's—whose Blade of the Immortal is also serialized in the same magazine—calling it "lithe and painterly", where it could also possibly be appreciated for distinguishing itself from the art of shōnen manga.
