= Dig It (manga) =

Japanese manga series

- First tankōbon volume cover, featuring Gaku Shishiya

ディグイット (Digu Itto)
- Genre: Sports
- Manga
- Written by: Yoshidamaru
- Published by: Kodansha
- English publisher: NA: Kodansha USA
- Imprint: Afternoon KC
- Magazine: Monthly Afternoon
- Original run: April 24, 2025 – present
- Volumes: 4
- icon

Dig It (Japanese: ディグイット, Hepburn: Digu Itto) is a Japanese manga series written and illustrated by Yoshidamaru. It began serialization in Kodansha's seinen manga magazine Monthly Afternoon in April 2025. Its chapters have been collected in four tankōbon volumes as of August 2026.

By August 2026, the manga had over 450,000 copies in circulation.

== Synopsis ==
Gaku Shishiya is a second-generation volleyball player in middle school, taking after his father Kei Shishiya, a former Japanese national volleyball team player. While training in the ace hitter position like his father did, Gaku has doubts over whether he is actually good at it. He then encounters Noboru, a student in the same role who proves to be a better hitter than him, impressing Kei. After discovering Kei has all but abandoned his son to mentor Noboru in his stead, his wife leaves him, taking Gaku with her.

Moving to Shizuoka following middle school graduation, Gaku attends Umino High where he joins the school's esteemed varsity volleyball team. Determined to prove his worth and ultimately prove his father and Noboru wrong, Gaku begins his volleyball training as a libero.

== Characters ==
=== Umino High volleyball team ===
Gaku Shishiya (獅子谷 岳, Shishiya Gaku)
A first-year high school student who plays as libero, after previously playing as ace hitter.
Aoi Momota (百田 葵, Momota Aoi)
A first-year high school student who plays as outside hitter.
Haruto Tsuzumi (鼓 遥仁, Tsuzumi Haruto)
A first-year high school student who plays as "all-rounder".
Itsuki Nagao (長尾 乙輝, Nagao Itsuki)
A third-year high school student who is captain of the team and plays as middle blocker.
Ryuya Hori (堀 竜矢, Hori Ryūya)
A third-year high school student who is vice captain of the team and plays as setter.
Sho Minaguchi (皆口 秤, Minaguchi Shō)
A third-year high school student who plays as outside hitter.
Toma Yagi (八木 斗真, Yagi Tōma)
A second-year high school student who plays as middle blocker.
Haruse Ushizuka (牛塚 晴瀬, Ushizuka Haruse)
A second-year high school student who plays as outside hitter.
Takaki Hatozaki (鳩崎 天基, Hatozaki Takaki)
A first-year high school student who plays as outside hitter.
Yota Komori (小森 洋太, Komori Yōta)
A third-year high school student who is manager of the team.
Tonami Kyogoku (京極 十南, Kyōgoku Tonami)
The 39-year-old advisor of the team. He was former libero of the Japanese national volleyball team.

== Publication ==
Written and illustrated by Yoshidamaru, Dig It began serialization in Kodansha's seinen manga magazine Monthly Afternoon on April 24, 2025. Its chapters have been collected in four tankōbon volumes as of August 21, 2026.

The series' chapters are published in English on Kodansha's K Manga app since April 2026. During their panel at Anime Expo 2026, Kodansha USA announced that it had licensed the manga for English publication, with the first volume set to release in Q2 2027.

=== Volumes ===
No.	Original release date	Original ISBN	English release date	English ISBN
1	August 22, 2025	978-4-06-539804-3	May 25, 2027	979-8-90074-089-8
1. "Dig It"; 2. "Stray Bond"; 3. "Unshakeable Goal" (揺るがない目標, Yuruganai Mokuhyō)
2	December 23, 2025	978-4-06-541652-5	—	—
4. "No. 2"; 5. "What We Carry" (背負うもの, Seō Mono); 6. "Last Chance Determination" (後がない決意, Ato ga Nai Ketsui)
3	April 23, 2026	978-4-06-543253-2	—	—
7. "No. 1"; 8. "Empty" (からっぽ, Karappo); 9. "Day 1"
4	August 21, 2026	978-4-06-544520-4; 978-4-06-545112-0 (LE)	—	—
10. "Day 2"; 11. "Unquenchable Tinder" (消えない火種, Kienai Hidane); 12. "Total Domination" (全員倒す, Zenin Taosu); Side Story: "No Place to Run! The Makeup Test Death Match" (逃げ場なし! 追試デスマッチ, Nigeba Nashi! Tsuishi Desumatchi)

=== Chapters not yet in tankōbon format ===
- 13. "Star" (スター, Sutā)
- 14. "Natural Enemy" (天敵, Tenteki)
- 15. "The Answer on the Board – Part 1" (盤上の答え 前編, Banjō no Kotae: Zenpen)
- 15. "The Answer on the Board – Part 2" (盤上の答え 後編, Banjō no Kotae: Kōhen)
- 16. "Reality Vs. Perception" (事実と認識, Jijitsu to Ninshiki)

== Reception ==
The series was ranked eleventh in the 2026 edition of Takarajimasha's Kono Manga ga Sugoi! guidebook's list of best manga for male readers. The series was ranked fourth in the Nationwide Bookstore Employees' Recommended Comics list of 2026. The series was ranked third in the seventh Sanyodo Bookstore Comic Awards in 2026. The series was nominated for the twelfth Next Manga Award in 2026 in the print category, where it placed seventeenth; it also won the U-Next Prize in the same category. By August 2026, the manga had over 450,000 copies in circulation.
