= Manga Lover =

Japanese manga series

- First tankōbon volume cover, featuring Misumi

マンガラバー (Manga Rabā)
- Genre: Drama; Slice of life
- Manga
- Written by: Ko Fumimura
- Published by: Kodansha
- English publisher: Kodansha USA
- Imprint: Afternoon KC
- Magazine: Monthly Afternoon
- Original run: April 24, 2025 – present
- Volumes: 3
- icon

Manga Lover (Japanese: マンガラバー, Hepburn: Manga Rabā) is a Japanese manga series written and illustrated by Ko Fumimura. It began serialization in Kodansha's seinen manga magazine Monthly Afternoon in April 2025. Its chapters have been collected in three tankōbon volumes as of July 2026.

== Plot ==
After interviewing several Toyoko kids in the Kabukichō district of Shinjuku for research, manga editor Hiroki Yanai is approached by a homeless girl named Misumi who is insistent on showing him her manuscripts, leading them to a small space in a manga cafe where she works. Doubting her competence and not wanting to upset her, Yanai asks Misumi to submit her work to his publisher's office and leaves. The next day at the office, Yanai encounters Misumi waiting in the lobby with her manuscripts, completely redrawn from scratch overnight. Reading it alone, Yanai is left emotionally moved by her work. Sometime later, Yanai meets Misumi at the cafe, offering to become her editor and give whatever she needs to begin as a manga artist, including paying for her own home. Misumi insists on living in his apartment instead; as she starts on her new career, her eccentric, audacious personality and goals begin to upend Yanai's neat and orderly life as he learns just what it takes to be an ambitious manga artist.

== Characters ==
Hiroki Yanai (柳井 博己, Yanai Hiroki)
A manga editor for Monthly Top, a seinen manga magazine. He has worked there for three years. He has exceptional persuasive skills to woo both successful and newcomer manga artists, while maintaining high standards. To him, a manga that does not sell well is meaningless.
Misumi (美澄)
A young woman who is extremely dedicated as a manga artist. She lost her parents at a young age from a traffic accident, forcing her to live with her grandmother. After her grandmother's death, she spent a year homeless in Kabukichō where she self-taught herself to draw manga in a manga cafe, while working part-time as a housekeeper at a hotel. Her art style is noted to be rough and sketchy akin to indie comics, but emotionally moving.
Mori (森)
A manga assistant. He is a childhood friend to Yanai.
Imahashi (今橋)
A manga editor for Monthly Top. He is in his first year on the job, and looks up to Yanai.

== Publication ==
Written and illustrated by Ko Fumimura, Manga Lover began serialization in Kodansha's seinen manga magazine Monthly Afternoon on April 24, 2025. Kodansha has collected its chapters into individual tankōbon volumes, with the first volume released on October 23, 2025. As of July 22, 2026, three volumes have been released.

During their panel at Anime Expo 2026, Kodansha USA announced that it had licensed the manga for English publication, with the first volume set to release in Q2 2027.

=== Volumes ===
No.	Original release date	Original ISBN	English release date	English ISBN
1	October 23, 2025	978-4-06-540581-9	June 1, 2027	978-1-64729-658-2
2	March 23, 2026	978-4-06-542856-6	—	—
3	July 22, 2026	978-4-06-544219-7	—	—
