= The Darwin Incident =

Japanese manga series

- First tankōbon volume cover, featuring Charlie

ダーウィン事変 (Dāwin Jihen)
- Genre: Science fiction; Social thriller
- Manga
- Written by: Shun Umezawa
- Published by: Kodansha
- English publisher: NA: Kodansha USA
- Imprint: Afternoon KC
- Magazine: Monthly Afternoon
- Original run: June 25, 2020 – present
- Volumes: 11
- Anime television series
- Directed by: Naokatsu Tsuda; Katsuichi Nakayama
- Written by: Shinichi Inotsume
- Music by: Alisa Okehazama; Mariko Horikawa
- Studio: Bellnox Films
- Licensed by: Amazon Prime Video
- Original network: TXN (TV Tokyo)
- Original run: January 7, 2026 – April 1, 2026
- Episodes: 13
- icon

The Darwin Incident (Japanese: ダーウィン事変, Hepburn: Dāwin Jihen) is a Japanese manga series written and illustrated by Shun Umezawa. It has been serialized in Kodansha's seinen manga magazine Monthly Afternoon since June 2020. An anime television series adaptation produced by Bellnox Films aired from January to April 2026. The story follows a humanzee, whose very existence causes an uproar in American society. While he, a human friend, and his adoptive parents want a normal life with his own rights and freedoms, powerful forces, including an influential extremist animal rights organization, threaten to disrupt this.

By May 2024, the manga had over 1.6 million copies in circulation. In 2022, The Darwin Incident won the 15th Manga Taishō, as well as the Excellence Award at the 25th Japan Media Arts Festival. It won the 50th Kodansha Manga Award in the general category in 2026.

== Plot ==
An extremist animal rights organization called the Animal Liberation Alliance (ALA) carries out a raid on a biological research institute and rescues a miscarrying chimpanzee. At an animal hospital, she gives birth to Charlie, a rare human–chimpanzee hybrid known as a "humanzee".

Raised by human adoptive parents, Charlie develops physical abilities far beyond those of either humans or chimpanzees. Charlie enters high school at the age of 15, where he befriends a shy girl named Lucy Eldred. As he attends high school, he faces fear, prejudice, and moral conflict. Meanwhile, the ALA set their sights on Charlie.

== Characters ==
Charlie (チャーリー, Chārī)
Voiced by: Atsumi Tanezaki (Japanese); Yenni Ann (English)
A 15-year-old boy living in Missouri, United States. The world's only "Humanzee", half human and half chimpanzee, was created using genome-editing technology and possesses intelligence that surpasses that of humans and physical abilities that exceed those of chimpanzees. He is calm, but after enrolling in a local high school at the age of 15, he developed a strong interest in humans. On the other hand, having had little interaction with anyone other than his adoptive parents, Gilbert and Hannah, he often behaves in ways that surprise those around him.
Lucy Eldred (ルーシー・エルドレッド, Rūshī Erudoreddo)
Voiced by: Mitsuho Kambe (Japanese); Kate Domenech (English)
Charlie's classmate at Shrews High School. Although she is an honors student with a frank personality and strong drive, she also has a brilliant mind, but she is fed up with the relationships in her town and at high school. For this reason, she has not actively interacted with other people. However, after Charlie rescues her from falling out of a tree, she develops a strong interest in him and becomes his friend.
Rivera Feyerabend (リヴェラ・ファイヤアーベント, Rivera Faiyaābento)
Voiced by: Akio Otsuka (Japanese); Sean Tapiero (English)
The leader of the ALA. While he comes across as being friendly and composed, he is actually very calculating, manipulative, and ruthless. He has a strong interest in Charlie.
Gilbert Stein (ギルバート・スタイン, Girubāto Sutain)
Voiced by: Toshiyuki Morikawa (Japanese); Roly Gutierrez (English)
A primatologist and Charlie's adoptive father.
Hannah Stein (ハンナ・スタイン, Hanna Sutain)
Voiced by: Rina Satō (Japanese); Sara Secora (English)
A lawyer and Charlie's adoptive mother.
Philip Graham (フィリップ・グラハム, Firippu Gurahamu)
Voiced by: Yōji Ueda (Japanese); Tim Powers^{Ep. 2 credits} (English)
A deputy in Shrewsville who while initially antagonistic, eventually helps and fosters Charlie. He is commonly referred to as "Phil" (フィル, Firu).
Gare (ゲイル, Geiru)
Voiced by: Kaito Ishikawa (Japanese); Kevin Garcia^{Ep. 5 credits} (English)
A student at Shrews High School who believes in animal rights. Due to his admiration for the ALA, Rivera is able to convince Gare into committing a mass shooting at the school.
Lesley K. Lippman (レスリー・K・リップマン, Resurī Kei Rippuman)
Voiced by: Hiroya Egashira (Japanese); Charles Sothers (English)
A former officer in the U.S. Army who act as second-in-command in the ALA.
Dafne M. Linares (ダフネ・M・リナレス, Dafune Emu Rinaresu)
Voiced by: Yoko Soumi (Japanese); Nicole Quintana^{Ep. 5 credits} (English)
A Congresswoman who involves herself in the legality surrounding Charlie. She has written a book on animal rights.
Roy Navarro (ロイ・ナヴァロ, Roi Navaro)
Voiced by: Izo Oikawa (Japanese); Rene Granado^{Ep. 5 credits} (English)
The sheriff of the Shrewsville Police Department who is Phil's boss.
Ronnie Schulz (ロニー・シュルツ, Ronī Shurutsu)
Voiced by: Yasuhiro Kikuchi (Japanese); Heath Martin^{Ep. 7 credits} (English)
An influential figure in Shrewsville.
Maurice Williams (モリス・ウィリアムズ, Morisu Wiriamuzu)
Voiced by: Fumihiko Tachiki (Japanese); Marcus Rothenberg^{Ep. 8 credits} (English)
An FBI agent involved in Charlie's case. He is a habitual smoker.
Kyle Foster (カイル・フォスター, Kairu Fosutā)
Voiced by: Toshiki Watanabe (Japanese); Chris Vandepas^{Ep. 8 credits} (English)
Williams' partner in the FBI.
Sarah Yuan (サラ・ユァン, Sara Yuan)
Voiced by: Ami Koshimizu (Japanese); Emi Lo^{Ep. 13 credits} (English)
A doctor of Korean descent who is a co-conspirator of the ALA.
Omelas (オメラス, Omerasu)
Voiced by: Takuya Satō (Japanese); Jason Kesser^{Ep. 13 credits} (English)
Charlie's secret humanzee younger brother, who is hidden by Rivera.

== Production ==
Shun Umezawa previously wrote a short story titled Mō Ningen (もう人間; lit. 'Already Human'), which explored the bioethics of what defines a human being. He explained that The Darwin Incident is a thought experiment that expanded upon the short story, wondering how people would react if a being like Charlie existed and the boundary between humans and animals collapsed.

Initially, Umezawa showed the prototype of the story to Koji Terayama, the editor-in-charge, and told him what he wanted to write about. According to Terayama, Umezawa read a considerable amount of literature and applied it to the story, such as extensive research on humanzees.

Umezawa stated that the reason The Darwin Incident is set in the United States was due to wanting the characters to have lively discussions about discrimination and terrorism, believing that such a setting allowed a greater sense of realism concerning these issues. While neither Umezawa nor any of the editors and staff have ever lived in the United States, Umezawa, a fan of foreign films and television shows, broadened his portrayal of the country via these sources.

Regarding Charlie, Umezawa stated that he initially drew him realistically, before settling on his final character design after deeming it "too scary".

== Media ==
=== Manga ===
Written and illustrated by Shun Umezawa, The Darwin Incident started in Kodansha's seinen manga magazine Monthly Afternoon on June 25, 2020. Kodansha has collected its chapters into individual tankōbon volumes. The first volume was released on November 20, 2020. As of June 23, 2026, eleven volumes have been released.

During their panel at Anime NYC 2022, Kodansha USA announced that they licensed the manga, with the first volume released on September 5, 2023.

==== Volumes ====
No.	Original release date	Original ISBN	English release date	English ISBN
1	November 20, 2020	978-4-06-521398-8	September 5, 2023	979-8-88933-228-2 (digital); 978-1-64729-316-1 (print)
1. "Hybridization"; 2. "Observers" (観察者, Kansatsusha) (Note: "Observation" in the original Monthly Afternoon release.); 3. "Kaleidoscope Eyes" (万華鏡の目, Mangekyō no Me); 4. "Heterosis" (ヘテローシス, Heterōshisu) (Note: "Raid" in the original Monthly Afternoon release.); 5. "One of a Kind" (Note: "One" (rendered in Latin-script) in the Japanese release.)
2	May 21, 2021	978-4-06-523314-6	November 7, 2023	979-888933-345-6 (digital); 978-1-64729-317-8 (print)
6. "A Gap in the Law"; 7. "The Struggle for Rights" (権利のための闘争?, Kenri no Tame no Tōsō?); 8. "Omen" (兆し, Kizashi); 9. "Direct Action" (直接行動, Chokusetsu Kōdō) (Note: Seigi no Mikata (セイギノミカタ) in the original Monthly Afternoon release.); 10. "Red Pill" (レッド・ピル, Reddo Piru); 11. "Trickster"
3	November 22, 2021	978-4-06-525778-4	January 2, 2024 (digital); January 23, 2024 (print)	979-8-88933-394-4 (digital); 978-1-64729-318-5 (print)
12. "Visitors" (訪問者, Hōmon-sha); 13. "Scapegoat" (スケープゴート, Sukeipugōto); 14. "Is-Ought"; 15. "Bluebeard's Castle ①" (青髭の城にて①, Aohige no Shiro Nite ①); 16. "Bluebeard's Castle ②" (青髭の城にて②, Aohige no Shiro Nite ②); 17. "Bluebeard's Castle ③" (青髭の城にて③, Aohige no Shiro Nite ③)
4	April 21, 2022	978-4-06-527946-5	March 5, 2024	979-8-88933-526-9 (digital); 978-1-64729-337-6 (print)
18. "Unowned Property" (無主物, Mushu Butsu); 19. "Transfer of Ownership" (所有権の移転, Shoyū Ken no Iten); 20. "Sexual Dimorphism" (性的二形, Seiteki Futanari); 21. "Little Shop of Horrors"; 22. "Will"
5	March 23, 2023	978-4-06-531026-7	May 7, 2024	979-8-88933-604-4 (digital); 978-1-64729-343-7 (print)
23. "A Family Affair"; 24. "Pet Cemetery"; 25. "The Price of Logos" (ロゴスの代償, Rogosu no Daishō); 26. "On the Border"; 27. "Galton Inc." (ゴルトン社, Goruton Sha)
6	November 22, 2023	978-4-06-533687-8	July 9, 2024	979-8-88933-706-5 (digital); 978-1-64729-355-0 (print)
28. "Animal Spirits"; 29. "Manhunt"; 30. "Surrogate"; 31. "Summit Meeting" (首脳会談, Shunō Kaidan); 32. "The Darwinian Algorithm" (ダーウィンのアルゴリズム, Dāwin no Arugorizumu)
7	May 22, 2024	978-4-06-535534-3	June 10, 2025	979-8-89478-599-8 (digital); 978-1-64729-453-3 (print)
33. "Covert Action" (隠密行動, Onmitsu Kōdō); 34. "A Proposal" (Note: "Suggestion" in the Japanese release.); 35. "Face to Face"; 36. "Babel" (バベル, Baberu); 37. "Heart of Darkness" (闇の奥, Yami no Oku)
8	November 21, 2024	978-4-06-537463-4	September 23, 2025	979-8-89478-701-5 (digital); 978-1-64729-492-2 (print)
38. "Authority" (権原, Kengen); 39. "An Interview"; 40. "Truth or Dare"; 41. "Colonizers" (コロニアル, Koroniaru); 42. "No-clipping"
9	May 22, 2025	978-4-06-539468-7	February 24, 2026	979-8-89478-883-8 (digital); 978-1-64729-576-9 (print)
43. "Where Is My Mind?"; 44. "'Home'" ("ホーム", "Hōmu"); 45. "Human Nature"; 46. "Seed" (種, Tane); 47. "The Only Neat Thing to Do" (たったひとつの冴えたやり方, Tatta Hitotsu no Saeta Yarikata)
10	December 23, 2025	978-4-06-541466-8	October 20, 2026	979-8-89830-250-4 (digital); 978-1-64729-632-2 (print)
48. "Exodus" (エクソダス, Ekusodasu); 49. "Apolitical" (ノンポリ, Nonpori); 50. "Eubik" (ユービック, Yūbikku); 51. "The Queen" (Note: "Queen" in the Japanese release.); 52. "A Message" (伝言, Dengon)
11	June 23, 2026	978-4-06-543825-1	—	—
53. "Rabbit Hole"; 54. "State of Emergency"; 55. "Traitor"; 56. "Rational Animal"; 57. Saigo no Tobira (最後の扉)
12	December 22, 2026	978-4-06-546124-2	—	—

=== Anime ===
In May 2024, it was announced that the manga would receive an anime television series adaptation. The series was produced by Bellnox Films and directed by Naokatsu Tsuda, with Katsuichi Nakayama serving as series director, Shinichi Inotsume overseeing series composition, Shinpei Tomooka designing the characters, and Alisa Okehazama and Mariko Horikawa composing the music. It aired from January 7 to April 1, 2026, on TV Tokyo and its affiliates. (Note: TV Tokyo listed the series premiere on January 6 at 24:00, which is effectively January 7 at midnight JST.) The opening theme is "Make Me Wonder", performed by Official Hige Dandism, while the ending theme is "Turn It Up", performed by Ako.

The series is streaming on Amazon Prime Video.

==== Episodes ====
No.	Title	Directed by (Note: Production staff information is taken from the ending credits of each episode.)	Written by	Storyboarded by	Original release date
1	"Humanzee" (Note: Stylized in all caps.)	Naokatsu Tsuda & Katsuichi Nakayama	Shinichi Inotsume	Naokatsu Tsuda & Katsuichi Nakayama	January 7, 2026
An extremist animal rights organization called the Animal Liberation Alliance (ALA) raids the Stollard Biological Research Institute in Escondido, California, where they come across a miscarrying chimpanzee. Once she is rescued, the chimpanzee gives birth to a humanzee. Fifteen years later, the humanzee, known as Charlie, is living with Gilbert and Hannah Stein, his adoptive parents. During the first day of school at Shrews High School, Charlie rescues a female student named Lucy Eldred after she attempts to help a cat stuck in a tree. In the cafeteria, Charlie and Lucy befriend each other. Charlie then gives Ozzy a surprisingly blunt answer when he is asked a hypothetical question concerning his vegan lifestyle. Five days later, the ALA celebrate setting off a terrorist attack at a steakhouse in New York City before they proceed to go after Charlie as their next target.
2	"ALA (Animal Liberation Alliance)"	Katsuya Asano	Shinichi Inotsume	Taizo Yoshida	January 14, 2026
The ALA take responsibility for the terrorist attack. Meanwhile, Gilbert attempts to pick up Charlie when they are approached by Deputy Philip Graham of the Shrewsville Police Department. That night, Charlie assures his parents that he wants to continue attending school. Once he returns there, he is spied upon by three members of the ALA. During lunch, Charlie gives another blunt answer when asked about his vegan lifestyle. He and Lucy are then approached by a male student named Gare, who is an admirer of the ALA. Later on, Charlie and Lucy hang out together in a park. While tailing Charlie after school, Phil tells his partner Marco about an incident involving Charlie that occurred ten years ago which was not made public. Elsewhere, Lucy is bumped into by the leader of the ALA. The next day, Charlie, Gilbert and Lucy arrive at Kornberg Primate Research Institute in St. Louis. There, Lucy is introduced to Eva, Charlie biological mother.
3	"Heterosis"; Transliteration: "Heterōshisu" (Japanese: ヘテローシス)	Tatsuya Kyōgoku	Shinichi Inotsume	For(wal)k	January 21, 2026
Gilbert explains that he saved Eva's life via a caesarean section. Despite this, Charlie admits that he has no real emotional attachment to his biological mother. Dr. Fowler then reveals the histories of Eva and his colleague Dr. Grossman. He also reveals Eva is in poor health. That evening, the three members of the ALA attempt to kill Lucy and the Steins, which is thwarted by Charlie. At the police station, Lucy's mother, Lydia, warns her daughter to stay away from Charlie. The next day, Charlie and Lucy secretly hang out together at the park. Charlie later arrives at the members' hideout.
4	"One of a Kind" (Note: This episode is titled "ONE" in the Japanese version.)	Shinpei Tomooka & Katsuya Furumoto	Shinichi Inotsume	Hideki Nagamachi	January 28, 2026
Charlie asks the members to turn themselves in, as he knows they were the ones who attacked his parents and Lucy. When it appears that they have surrendered, the leader, Rivera Feyerabend, and his second-in-command, Lesley K. Lippman, escape after the former stabs the third member, Min-su. As a result, both Charlie and Min-su are put into custody. Elsewhere in Richmond, Virginia, a SWAT team locate and arrest six members of the ALA. While heading to the police station, the Steins tell Lucy that due to being a humanzee, Charlie does not have any legal rights. They then reveal the full details of the incident that occurred ten years ago, including the settlement that was reached. Once she learns the truth, Lucy decides she is going to help the Steins in their fight to ensure that Charlie is granted citizenship rights. At the police station, Charlie breaks out of his cell when Marco grabs Lucy.
5	"The Struggle for Rights"; Transliteration: "Kenri no Tame no Tōsō?" (Japanese: 権利のための闘争？)	Katsuichi Nakayama	Anna Kawahara	Katsuichi Nakayama	February 4, 2026
Phil tries to stop Charlie from leaving, but he is overruled by his boss, Sheriff Roy Navarro. Once the Steins are home, it is revealed Dafne M. Linares, a Congresswoman, was the one responsible for Charlie's release. At school, Lucy tells Charlie about her plan to help him win his rights. However, it fails when the other students start ostracizing them. The next day, Charlie and Lucy are hanging out in the cafeteria when the former becomes friends with Mia and Kayla after they get over their initial trepidation. Gare is later confronted by Ozzy when he stages a protest for animal rights. Meanwhile, Phil is frustrated when Navarro informs him that the investigation into Charlie is over.
6	"Direct Action"; Transliteration: "Chokusetsu Kōdō" (Japanese: 直接行動)	Tatsuya Kyōgoku	Shinichi Inotsume	Tatsuya Kyōgoku	February 11, 2026
Charlie and Lucy intervene when Ozzy is about to punch Gare. Afterward, Charlie bluntly tells a hysterical Gare that he does not speak for anyone else as he is simply another animal. At his home, Gare does a livestream on his Red Pill Channel before he sneaks out to meet Rivera and Lippman. In a diner, Gare expresses his admiration for the ALA. Just before they leave, Rivera is racially taunted by the owner, Rainey S. Carty. That night, Rainey is stabbed to death by Gare after Rivera convinces him into joining the ALA's cause. Gare later livestreams himself committing a mass shooting at school under Rivera's instructions. After a while, Gare enters Lucy's classroom and shoots two of her classmates.
7	"Red Pill"; Transliteration: "Reddo Piru" (Japanese: レッド・ピル)	Mineo Ōe & Fuko Abe	Shinichi Inotsume	Taizo Yoshida	February 18, 2026
Rivera and Lippman watch from a distance as the police arrive at the scene. They come across Charlie, who gives them the victims in need of medical care. He proceeds to head back inside the school when he realizes Lucy is still missing. Meanwhile, Gare shoots two more of Lucy's classmates. Lucy reunites with Charlie immediately after Gare spares her life. Once he is found in the cafeteria, Gare attempts to die via suicide by cop, but he is saved by Charlie. One week later, Linares is at the Steins where she informs them that she wants them to keep looking after Charlie. That night, Lucy notices a confrontation between the Steins and an angry mob.
8	"Visitors"; Transliteration: "Hōmon-sha" (Japanese: 訪問者)	Hirofumi Ogura	Shinichi Inotsume	Taizo Yoshida	February 25, 2026
In response to the nationwide tension caused by the mass shooting, the FBI has formed a task force. Elsewhere, Lucy defends the Steins and Charlie before an intervention from FBI agents Maurice Williams and Kyle Foster causes the mob to depart. At the police station, both the police and the agents agree to cooperate in their investigation. The next day, Williams and Foster discover the leader of the mob is an influential figure named Ronnie Schultz. Later on, Phil arrives at Ronnie's house. During their conversation, Phil agrees it is best to tell the Steins to leave town for everyone's sake. After catching the perpetrator who threw a stone through the Steins' window, Phil and Gilbert end up having a genuine conversation about different philosophies. Once he leaves, Phil comes across Lucy. Meanwhile, Rivera arrives in town accompanied by some more members of the ALA.
9	"Bluebeard's Castle"; Transliteration: "Aohige no Shiro Nite" (Japanese: 青髭の城にて)	Tatsuya Kyōgoku	Shinichi Inotsume & Anna Kawahara	Tatsuya Kyōgoku	March 4, 2026
Williams and Foster wonder why the ALA is so fixated with Charlie and when exactly they became radicalized. That night, Hannah is delighted when Charlie tells her that he wants to know more about Lucy. Charlie proceeds to go after Rivera alone when the latter informs him that he has kidnapped Lucy. Inside a cabin, Rivera assures Lucy that her mother is unharmed. He then goes on to explain that his ultimate goal is to accelerate mankind's evolution. Once Charlie arrives in the area, he outsmarts and overwhelms the other members of the ALA, leaving Lippman as the only one still standing. Back in the cabin, Rivera reveals to a shocked Lucy that he discovered something interesting about her when he wondered why she is so special to Charlie.
10	"Door to Accelerated Advancement"; Transliteration: "Kasoku Suru Tobira" (Japanese: 加速する扉)	Erika Toshimitsu	Shinichi Inotsume	Hideki Nagamachi	March 11, 2026
Lippman tries to recruit Charlie into the ALA by explaining how their actions will benefit both humanity and animals in the long term. However, Charlie injures Lippman after he turns down the offer. Once Charlie finally arrives at the cabin, Rivera reveals the person who approached the ALA to raid the Stollard Biological Research Institute fifteen years ago was none other than Dr. Grossman himself. He also reveals how the ALA operated prior to meeting Dr. Grossman. After a while, Lucy and Charlie are rescued by a group of police officers led by Phil. As Rivera is being apprehended, Lucy realizes Charlie's parents are in danger. When Charlie heads home, he retrieves their dead bodies. He is then seen retreating into the woods by Lucy and Phil. Back in the cabin, Rivera escapes after he kills the other officers.
11	"Transfer of Ownership"; Transliteration: "Shoyū Ken no Iten" (Japanese: 所有権の移転)	Katsuya Asano	Anna Kawahara	Katsuya Asano	March 18, 2026
At the police station, Phil tells Marco that he is going to take some time off. Elsewhere, Lucy, her mother, Williams and Foster attend the Steins' funeral. While the state police are tailing Lucy, Phil distracts them long enough to allow her to reunite with Charlie. She soon receives a call from Dr. Fowler. When Lucy and Phil arrive at the Kornberg Primate Research Institute, they meet up with Linares, who reveals that due to the Steins' death, a public agency who catches Charlie will have the rights to claim him. Lucy then becomes frustrated when Linares mentions she wants to assign Charlie new foster parents. Once Phil finds Lucy and Charlie, he offers to adopt the latter, which is ultimately accepted. Charlie and Lucy are later introduced to Phil's wife, Grace. The next day, Phil is in Navarro's office.
12	"Sexual Dimorphism"; Transliteration: "Seiteki Futanari" (Japanese: 性的二形)	Natsumi Mamada	Shinichi Inotsume	Tsutomu Miyazawa	March 25, 2026
Phil is suspended indefinitely for refusing to hand Charlie over. When Linares is informed about the situation, she offers to support him as far as she can. That night, Ronnie gives Phil his badge back. The next day at the Kornberg Primate Research Institute, Dr. Fowler explains to the Grahams that Charlie is hitting puberty. During dinner, Lucy has a conversation with the Grahams about Linares and animal rights. Later on, while they are alone together, Charlie admits to Lucy that he wants to find and meet Dr. Grossman. In turn, Lucy reveals she was conceived through artificial insemination. Afterward, Lucy is flustered when Charlie asks if she wants to have sex with him, albeit she does give him a kiss. Elsewhere, Williams and Foster question Lippman about the ALA in Jefferson City, Missouri, while Rivera kidnaps James M. Alcott, the Secretary of Agriculture, in North Dakota.
13	"Will"	Naokatsu Tsuda & Katsuichi Nakayama	Shinichi Inotsume & Naokatsu Tsuda	Koichi Chigira	April 1, 2026
At a restaurant, Rivera is met by Dr. Sarah Yuan, a co-conspirator of the ALA. She asks that he makes sure an individual remains hidden from the public. Elsewhere, Charlie, Lucy and Grace go grocery shopping. While the other shoppers initially have mixed feelings about Charlie, they end up with a positive impression of him. Somewhere near the Canadian border, a couple of police officers come across twelve mutilated bodies inside an abandoned truck, including Alcott's. At the Kornberg Primate Research Institute, Charlie, Lucy and the Grahams visit a dying Eva. After a while, Lucy realizes Eva wants to give Charlie a final message. Before she dies, Eva reveals Charlie is not her only child. Meanwhile, Rivera is with Charlie's younger brother, Omelas, who reveals he was the one who killed the Steins.

== Reception ==
=== Manga ===
By May 2024, the manga had over 1.6 million copies in circulation. It ranked 10th on Takarajimasha's Kono Manga ga Sugoi! 2022 list of best manga for male readers. The series won the 15th Manga Taishō in 2022. The series ranked second on the Publisher Comics' Recommended Comics of 2022. It won an Excellence Award at the 25th Japan Media Arts Festival in 2022. It was ranked fifth at the first Late Night Manga Award hosted by Bungeishunjū's Crea magazine in 2022. It was nominated for the 47th Kodansha Manga Award in the general category in 2023; it was also nominated for the 48th edition in the same category in 2024; it won the award in the 50th edition in 2026.

The manga was awarded the French 17th ACBD's Prize "Asie de la Critique" in 2023. It was nominated for the Japan Society and Anime NYC's first American Manga Awards in the Best New Manga category in 2024.

=== Anime ===
Reviewing the anime adaptation, The Encyclopedia of Science Fiction was mostly positive, praising how "the story moves along in a reasonably exciting manner and covers intriguing topics (though the ALA are the villains, the case for animal rights is treated sympathetically)", although it criticized its "broadly-defined characters" as well as its "pulpish" plotting. It noted the similarities of Charlie's reflections on communication between species to Ludwig Wittgenstein's comment in Philosophical Investigations, that "If a lion could speak, we could not understand him."
