= Monthly Afternoon =

Japanese manga magazine

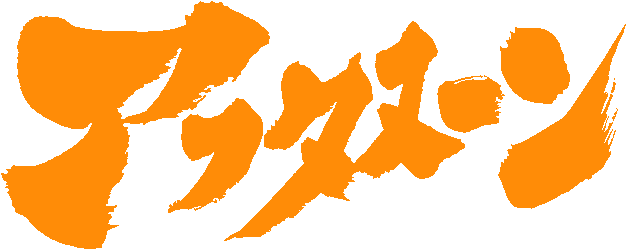

- Cover of the October 2011 issue, featuring Mysterious Girlfriend X
- Editor-in-Chief: Akira Kanai
- Former editors: Yoshiyuki Kurihara; Koichi Yuri; Kohei Furukawa; Shohei Yoshida; Tatsuya Shishikura
- Categories: Seinen manga
- Frequency: Monthly
- Circulation: 19,300; (July–September 2026)
- Publisher: Kodansha
- First issue: December 25, 1986; 39 years ago
- Country: Japan
- Based in: Tokyo
- Language: Japanese
- Website: afternoon.kodansha.co.jp

Monthly Afternoon (Japanese: 月刊アフタヌーン, Hepburn: Gekkan Afutanūn) is a Japanese monthly seinen manga anthology published by Kodansha. The first issue was published in December 1986, with new issues released on the 25th of each month. Monthly Afternoon has spawned many successful manga series that span a variety of different genres, such as Oh My Goddess!, Blade of the Immortal, Genshiken, and Big Windup!. Chapters of each manga series in the magazine are compiled and released as tankōbon volumes under its "Afternoon KC" imprint. A spin-off magazine, named good! Afternoon, started publishing in November 2008.

== History ==
Monthly Afternoon was launched as a sister magazine to Morning by its then-editor-in-chief, Yoshiyuki Kurihara, who would become the first editor-in-chief of Afternoon as well. It effectively replaced a former special issue to Morning, Morning Magnum Zōkan, (Note: Japanese: モーニングマグナム増刊, Hepburn: Mōningu Magunamu Zōkan; lit. 'Morning Magnum Special Edition') of which its final issue was published on November 25, 1986. With the cover date of February 1987, Afternoon's inaugural issue was published the following month on December 25, with most of its manga titles supplanted from Morning Magnum Zōkan. Kurihara noted that the former special issue was published too frequently to the point it had to switch to a regular publication schedule as a new magazine, along with Morning's editorial department growing increasingly too large. Initially, both Afternoon and Morning shared the same editorial department. According to Frederik L. Schodt, stories that Morning editors liked but felt did not fit the magazine would often land in Afternoon. Afternoon has since maintained its own separate editorial department.

Afternoon's original purpose was as a complementary magazine to Morning, acting as an "experimental zone" for newcomer manga artists to develop unique art styles in manga. Vice editor of Morning, Yasumitsu Tsutsumi, described the differences between the two magazines in 1994: "Morning uses manga to express ideas and write stories. Afternoon, of course, is similar, but it is also about manga itself, and experimenting and developing forms of expression in manga." According to Akira Kanai, the editor-in-chief of Afternoon as of 2015, Kurihara offered a similar distinction between the two magazines: while Morning was focused on expressing Japanese culture through manga, Afternoon would focus on expressing new styles within manga. Kanai summarized this philosophy thus "if Japan is interesting, Morning is interesting", and "if manga is interesting, Afternoon is interesting."

Under the magazine's approach of eschewing an editorial policy in favor of publishing what is experimental and "interesting", Afternoon gained a reputation for its sheer quantity of both its titles and pages, alongside its diverse selection of manga. In late 1991, when the magazine reached 500 pages, Kurihara declared a goal of reaching over 1,000 pages, which was achieved the following year in its February 1993 issue. (Note: Released on December 25, 1992.) For the next four-and-a-half years until the October 1997 issue, (Note: Released on August 25, 1997.) every issue would consistently reach or surpass 1,000 pages, a trait the magazine would boast in its front cover slogans at the time. Reportedly, the size was so great the editor-in-chief could not finish reading through every manga in each issue. The number of pages per issue has since settled to around 700–800 pages, with around thirty to thirty-five stories. Adding to its diversity was the novel approach of inviting foreign artists and writers to create manga in Afternoon, much like in Morning with its editorial's international project. According to Kanai, logistical issues such as scheduling conflicts and language barriers caused the number of overseas contributors to diminish by the end of the 1990s. Since the 2020s, Afternoon has resumed efforts in featuring overseas artists and writers in the magazine.

Also increasingly featured in Afternoon were so-called "otaku manga", which Sharon Kinsella defines as "unusual or non-commercial manga in general." Many of the manga artists working for the magazine used to publish amateur doujinshi, with some of them being part of the otaku subculture. Outside of otaku manga, Kinsella claims a number of manga serialized by the mid-1990s were also inspired by lolicon amateur manga and aesthetics, referring to six series that took up around half of the pages in Afternoon between 1994 and 1997: Discommunication, Gunsmith Cats, Assembler 0X, Seraphic Feather, Aqua and Oh My Goddess!. Of the six, four of them were openly admitted by Afternoon editors to be considered otaku manga as well. However, Kinsella noted the stronger narrative structures and absence of sex scenes in the aforementioned series allowed them to be more widely accepted and popular.

Between 2006 and 2009, Afternoon was part of Kodansha's "e-1day" series, a comprehensive website which also included Morning and its other sister magazine, Evening. A similar website, "Moae", was established in May 2013, featuring the aforementioned magazines and their spin-offs, Morning Two and good! Afternoon. It has since been discontinued. An online platform, titled Comic Days, was launched in March 2018, featuring manga titles from various Kodansha magazines, including Afternoon. As of November 2013, new issues of Afternoon are distributed simultaneously in print and digitally.

In February 2024, the Afternoon editorial department, Skip and Loafer author Misaki Takamatsu, and the Skip and Loafer anime team donated 10 million yen to the Ishikawa Prefecture Relief Fund after the 2024 Noto earthquake.

== Newcomer award ==
Since 1987, Afternoon has held the seasonal Afternoon Shiki Shō (Note: Japanese: アフタヌーン四季賞, Hepburn: Afutanūn Shiki-shō; lit. 'Afternoon Four Seasons Award') contest for potential newcomer manga artists. Contenders submit one-shot stories for the chance to win prize money and have their work published in Afternoon, good! Afternoon, or Comic Days, out of five prize categories. A number of winning works have become serialized hits in Afternoon, such as Yokohama Kaidashi Kikou, Blame!, and Love Roma. In 2013, Kodansha published a selection of past winners in several volumes.

== Circulation and demographic ==
Like with most major manga magazines, Afternoon's circulation has been steadily declining, from an estimated 200,000 in the 1990s, to 22,800 in 2025. Despite higher circulation figures in the past, they were still considered low by large publishers' standards; according to Sharon Kinsella, the magazine did not generate any revenue for Morning's editorial department between its launch in 1986 and 1994.

About two-thirds of Afternoon readers consist of corporate workers or civil servants. In 1994, the average age of Afternoon readers was 28 years and four months, younger than the average age of 30 years and two months for adult manga readers. That same year, magazine editor Haruo Ogawa guessed that up to a third of readers of the magazine could be called otaku. In 2014, former editor-in-chief Tatsuya Shishikura estimated that most readers of Afternoon were in their mid-30s, further stating that while good! Afternoon is aimed at casual manga readers, Afternoon is aimed at "hardcore manga readers".

== Features ==
=== Series ===
There are currently 39 manga titles being serialized in Monthly Afternoon. Out of them, Big Windup!, Historié, Wandering Island and Yakuza Fiancé are on hiatus. Nella of the Horizon is serialized on an irregular schedule.

Series title	Author	Premiered
7-nin no Nemuri Hime (7人の眠り姫, Shichinin no Nemuri Hime)	Fiok Lee	March 2023
Asayake Refrain (あさやけリフレイン, Asayake Rifurein)	Hikari Matsuda	March 2025
Big Windup! (おおきく振りかぶって, Ōkiku Furikabutte)	Asa Higuchi	September 2003
Blue Period (ブルーピリオド, Burū Piriodo)	Tsubasa Yamaguchi	June 2017
The Chronicles of Leënde (レーエンデ国物語, Rēende Kuni Monogatari)	Ray Tasaki (story) and Nezu Usugumo (art)	October 2024
The Darwin Incident (ダーウィン事変, Dāwin Jihen)	Shun Umezawa	June 2020
Dig It (ディグイット, Digu Itto)	Yoshidamaru	April 2025
Fragile (フラジャイル, Furajairu)	Bin Kusamizu (story) and Megumi Saburo (art)	June 2014
Furu Kara-suya Satoshi (フルカラ～スヤサトシ)	Satoshi Karasuya	January 2024
Fushichō Koroshi (不死鳥殺し)	Akira Suga	August 2025
Golden Phantom (ゴールデンファントム, Gōruden Fantomu)	Daiki Yamazaki	February 2026
Gyakusatsu Kigen (逆殺起源)	Yūichirō Momose (story) and Shiwasu Hoshikawa (art)	May 2026
Heavenly Delusion (天国大魔境, Tengoku Daimakyō)	Masakazu Ishiguro	January 2018
Hellhound (ヘルハウンド, Heruhaundo)	Ryōji Minagawa	June 2022
High School in the Clouds (雲の中の学校, Kumo no Naka no Gakkō)	Shiho Takase	September 2026
Historié (ヒストリエ, Hisutorie)	Hitoshi Iwaaki	January 2003
Hyakudai Heikifu (百大兵器譜)	Ryū Suenobu	June 2026
Kaettekita Karasuya Satoshi (帰ってきたカラスヤサトシ)	Satoshi Karasuya	January 2018
Kraken Mare	Izu (story), Hagane (art) and Masato Hara (translation)	February 2025
Manga Lover (マンガラバー, Manga Rabā)	Ko Fumimura	April 2025
Medalist (メダリスト, Medarisuto)	Tsurumaikada	May 2020
Mirairaifurai (ミライライフライ)	Ao Ameta	October 2023
Mojiponika! (モジポニカ!)	Masaki Andō	May 2025
Moyashimon+ (もやしもん+)	Masayuki Ishikawa	November 2024
Nella of the Horizon (水平線のネラ, Suiheisen no Nera)	Yuki Urushibara	February 2025
Omori	Omocat (story) and Nui Konoito (art)	June 2024
Paris ni Saku Étoile (パリに咲くエトワール, Pari ni Saku Etowāru)	Gorō Taniguchi (original work) and Zelihan (art)	November 2025
PAX Kokumin Kōfuku Kanrikyoku (PAX 国民幸福管理局)	Maki Marukido	March 2026
Poo-Neko (プ～ねこ, Pu Neko)	Masayuki Kitamichi	December 2003
Shingetsu no Ban ni (新月の盤に)	Akino Miyabi	July 2025
Skip and Loafer (スキップとローファー, Sukippu to Rōfā)	Misaki Takamatsu	August 2018
Tengu no Daidokoro (天狗の台所)	Ai Tanaka	September 2021
Toppu GP (トップウGP, Toppū Jīpī)	Kōsuke Fujishima	May 2016
Under 3 (アンダー3, Andā Surī)	Shunji Enomoto	April 2014
Wandance (ワンダンス, Wandansu)	Coffee	January 2019
Wandering Island (冒険エレキテ島, Bōken Erekite-tō)	Kenji Tsuruta	September 2011
Wave, Listen to Me! (波よ聞いてくれ, Nami yo Kiitekure)	Hiroaki Samura	July 2014
When the Chameleon Flowers Bloom (どくだみの花咲くころ, Dokudami no Hanasaku Koro)	Shiho Kido	November 2023
Yakuza Fiancé (来世は他人がいい, Raise wa Tanin ga Ii)	Asuka Konishi	August 2017

== Special issues ==
=== Afternoon Season Zōkan ===
Afternoon Season Zōkan (Note: Japanese: アフタヌーンシーズン増刊, Hepburn: Afutanūn Shīzun Zōkan; lit. 'Afternoon Season Special Edition') was Afternoon's first special issue spin-off magazine. It was originally published in eight issues between September 1987 and June 1988, shortly after the main magazine's launch. After over a decade, it was revived and began publishing on a quarterly basis from October 10, 1999, to October 10, 2002. It featured one-shots and bonus stories from established manga artists in Afternoon and newcomer artists, along with several new manga serializations such as Mushishi, Mokke, and Love-yan. Following the magazine's discontinuation after 14 issues were published, many of its series were transferred to Afternoon.

=== good! Afternoon ===
good! Afternoon (Note: Japanese: good! アフタヌーン, Hepburn: Guddo! Afutanūn) is Afternoon's current main spin-off magazine, launched on November 7, 2008. Its existence came around the same time other spin-off magazines under Kodansha, like Morning Two for Morning and Bessatsu Shōnen Magazine for Weekly Shōnen Magazine, were launched and had successful titles of their own. With good! Afternoon, its approach was toward a more younger audience compared to its parent magazine. Initially published bimonthly, good! Afternoon switched to a monthly publication schedule on November 7, 2012. New issues are published on the seventh of each month.

=== &Sofa ===
&Sofa (pronounced "and sofa") is a digital special issue manga and weekly column website run by several members of Afternoon's editorial department. It was launched on November 22, 2021, with new updates every Monday. It was designed for a broader, more female-oriented target audience than Afternoon's seinen readership, with themes of empathy and comfort. Alongside featuring several existing manga titles from Afternoon and other Kodansha magazines, all original manga titles in the website are serialized on the Comic Days online platform.

== Circulation figures ==
Monthly circulation
Year/Period	January–March	April–June	July–September	October–December	Magazine sales (est.)	Ref
1990s	200,000				24,000,000	
2000	170,000				2,040,000	
2001	160,000				1,920,000	
2002	160,000				1,920,000	
2003	140,000				1,680,000	
2004	144,583				1,734,996	
2005	133,834				1,606,008	
2006	127,417				1,529,004	
2007	119,666				1,435,992	
2008	—	114,000	114,334	117,667	1,380,000 (Note: Total average circulation for the year 2008 was 115,000.)	
2009	112,667	106,334	105,000	105,000	1,287,003	
2010	104,334	102,000	100,000	100,000	1,219,002	
2011	98,000	95,000	91,667	91,667	1,129,002	
2012	90,000	89,000	87,000	87,000	1,059,000	
2013	87,000	85,000	85,000	87,000	1,032,000	
2014	85,000	85,000	84,500	83,367	1,013,601	
2015	75,607	75,310	74,444	74,110	898,413	
2016	73,843	72,310	69,310	65,000	841,389	
2017	65,000	65,000	63,000	63,000	768,000	
2018	62,333	60,333	53,333	51,000	680,997	
2019	49,000	44,167	42,700	41,500	532,101	
2020	37,800	34,267	33,380	32,000	412,341	
2021	30,467	30,200	29,333	28,333	354,999	
2022	27,000	26,500	26,333	25,633	316,398	
2023	24,733	26,633	27,700	25,200	312,798	
2024	23,667	22,800	22,800	22,800	276,201	
2025	22,800	22,800	22,800	22,800	273,600	
1990s to 2025	65,840				27,652,845	
