= Love and Lies (disambiguation) =

Love and Lies or Love & Lies may refer to:

- Love & Lies, a 2013 Philippine TV series
- Love and Lies (manga), a Japanese manga and anime series
  - Love and Lies (2017 film), a Japanese film based on the manga series
- Love, Lies (2016 film), a South Korean film
- Love and Lies (1981 film), an American localization name for the Soviet film Vam i ne snilos (Вам и не снилось…, Could One Imagine?)
- Love and Lies (1990 film), a television movie featuring Robert Harper
- "Love and Lies", a 2011 episode of American television show Private Practice
- Love and Lies, the second studio album by Anthony Ramos

== See also ==
- Love Lies (disambiguation)
