= Lilim Holic =

Japanese manga series

- First tankōbon volume cover

りりむホリック (Ririmu Horikku)
- Genre: Romantic comedy
- Manga
- Written by: Musawo
- Published by: Kodansha
- Imprint: Shōnen Magazine Comics
- Magazine: Weekly Shōnen Magazine
- Original run: May 16, 2026 – present
- Volumes: 1

Lilim Holic (Japanese: りりむホリック, Hepburn: Ririmu Horikku) is a Japanese manga series written and illustrated by Musawo. It began serialization in Kodansha's Weekly Shōnen Magazine in May 2026, and has been compiled into a single volume as of August 2026.

== Plot ==
Hayato Yui, a high school student, is friends with Emu Kato. Widely considered among the most popular girls in class, Emu is a succubus, the two of them living in a world where humans and succubi coexist. The two of them bond over their shared interest in manga, with Emu being a fujoshi and Hayato aiming to become a manga artist. With their frequent interactions, Hayato is unable to believe that he has become close to such a popular student. However, as he develops feelings for her, Emu develops an interest on him too, having to reconcile the role of succubi in the Reiwa era with her desire to do erotic things with him.

== Characters ==
Hayato Yui (唯 颯人, Hayato Yui)
A 16-year-old high school student. He frequents the library with Emu due to their shared interest in manga. He aims to become a manga artist. He has developed feelings for Emu.
Emu Katou (加藤 えむ, Katō Emu)
Voiced by: Fairouz Ai (PV)
A succubus who has an interest in boys' love works. She is popular due to her looks and personality, but is secretly perverted. She has developed feelings for Hayato, but is too shy to express them. Although she is a succubus, the succubi of the series' world do not do actions associated with succubi, such as flying or entering dreams without permission. She is conscious about her snaggletooth.

== Publication ==
The series is written and illustrated by Musawo, who had previously serialized the manga Love and Lies on the Manga Box service from 2014 to 2022. It began serialization in Kodansha's Weekly Shōnen Magazine on May 16, 2026. The first tankōbon volume was released on August 17, 2026; a promotional video featuring Fairouz Ai was posted to YouTube to promote the volume's release.

| No. | Release date | ISBN |
|---|---|---|
| 1 | August 17, 2026 | 978-4-06-544501-3 |

== See also ==
- Love and Lies, another manga series by the same author
