= My Home Hero =

Japanese manga series

- First tankōbon volume cover

マイホームヒーロー (Mai Hōmu Hīrō)
- Genre: Crime, suspense
- Manga
- Written by: Naoki Yamakawa
- Illustrated by: Masashi Asaki
- Published by: Kodansha
- English publisher: NA: Kodansha USA
- Imprint: Young Magazine KC
- Magazine: Weekly Young Magazine
- Original run: May 29, 2017 – July 29, 2024
- Volumes: 26
- Anime television series
- Directed by: Takashi Kamei
- Produced by: Nobuhiko Kurosu; Yoshiteru Maeda; Hajime Maruyama; Hideo Momota; Akiko Nabeiwa; Fumihiro Ozawa; Yoshiyuki Shioya; Hitoshi Yagi
- Written by: Kōhei Kiyasu
- Music by: Kenji Kawai
- Studio: Tezuka Productions
- Licensed by: Crunchyroll (Note: In North America through Crunchyroll, LLC.); SA / SEA: Medialink
- Original network: Tokyo MX, BS NTV
- Original run: April 2, 2023 – June 18, 2023
- Episodes: 12
- Television drama
- Directed by: Takahiro Aoyama; Takayoshi Tanazawa; Daisuke Yamamoto; Hiroshi Mori
- Written by: Tsuyoshi Sakurai; Susumu Funabashi
- Music by: Hiroaki Tsutsumi
- Original network: MBS, TBS
- Original run: October 25, 2023 – December 20, 2023
- Episodes: 10
- Live-action film
- Directed by: Takahiro Aoyama
- Written by: Susumu Funabashi
- Music by: Hiroaki Tsutsumi
- Studio: Warner Bros. Japan
- Released: March 8, 2024
- Runtime: 118 minutes
- icon

My Home Hero (Japanese: マイホームヒーロー, Hepburn: Mai Hōmu Hīrō) is a Japanese manga series written by Naoki Yamakawa and illustrated by Masashi Asaki. It was serialized in Kodansha's seinen manga magazine Weekly Young Magazine from May 2017 to July 2024, with its chapters collected in 26 tankōbon volumes. An anime television series adaptation produced by Tezuka Productions aired from April to June 2023. A live-action television drama premiered in October 2023. A live-action film premiered in Japanese theatres in March 2024.

== Plot ==
A normal salaryman, Tetsuo Tosu, discovers that his adult daughter Reika is being physically and emotionally abused by her new boyfriend, a young man named Nobuto. Soon after discovering that Nobuto has a history of murdering other girls that he has dated in the past and is currently trying to get money from Reika's grandparents before planning to dispose of her as well, Tetsuo murders Nobuto. He then resolves to commit "the perfect crime" and hides the body with the help of his wife, Kasen. However, Nobuto was the only son of Yoshitatsu Matori, who runs a powerful yakuza branch in the city. While Tetsuo wishes to protect his family, he must now deal with Matori's men as they threaten his family to find out what happened to Nobuto.

== Characters ==
Tetsuo Tosu (鳥栖 哲雄, Tosu Tetsuo)
Voiced by: Junichi Suwabe (Japanese); Aaron Roberts (English)
Portrayed by: Kuranosuke Sasaki
A 47-year-old manager for a toy company who enjoys reading and writing mystery novels in his spare time. After murdering Nobuto, he uses his knowledge gained from mystery stories to dispose of the corpse, and then to counter the syndicate that surveils and directly threatens his family.
Kasen Tosu (鳥栖 歌仙, Tosu Kasen)
Voiced by: Sayaka Ohara (Japanese); Morgan Lauré (English)
Portrayed by: Tae Kimura
Tetsuo's 41-year-old wife and accomplice. She is a housewife but her father is the head of a rural cult she managed to leave. She and her mother pretend to speak for the spirits of departed cultists and their families. She and Tetsuo have another son later.
Reika Tosu (鳥栖 零花, Tosu Reika)
Voiced by: Chihiro Shirata (Japanese); Kelly Greenshield (English)
Portrayed by: Asuka Saitō
An 18-year-old college student trapped in an abusive relationship with Nobuto at the start of the story, until he is murdered. She offers to help her parents with their garden, unaware of their role in Nobuto's disappearance. She becomes a police investigator in the 3rd arc of the manga after a time skip.
Kyōichi Majima (間島 恭一, Majima Kyōichi)
Voiced by: Kent Itō (Japanese); Nazeeh Tarsha (English)
Portrayed by: Kyōhei Takahashi
A member of the syndicate who works under Kubo. Incredibly skilled at surveillance and detection, as well as taking countermeasures against both. He entered the Yakuza to settle a family debt.
Nobuto Matori (麻取 延人, Matori Nobuto)
Voiced by: Keita Tada (Japanese); Jordan Dash Cruz (English)
Portrayed by: Shuichiro Naito
A loud young man who boasts about extorting girls for money and "accidentally" murdered at least two of them. When Tetsuo murders him at the start of the story, his remains become a focal point of the plot from then on.
Yoshitatsu Matori (麻取 義辰, Matori Yoshitatsu)
Voiced by: Shin-ichiro Miki (Japanese); Eric Vale (English)
Portrayed by: Eisaku Yoshida
Nobuto's father, the head of a local yakuza branch who makes a lot of money for the family. He seeks to find out what happened to his only son, to the point that he threatens to leave the syndicate if they do not come up with an answer.
Hibiki (響)
Voiced by: Rumi Okubo (Japanese); Corey Pettit (English)
Reika's classmate.
Kubo (窪)
Voiced by: Akio Otsuka (Japanese); Jarrod Greene (English)
Portrayed by: Takuma Otoo
Yoshitatsu's trusted lieutenant and Majima's superior. He swears vengeance on Tetsuo's family and turns into a serial killer after seeing all his men die.
Shino (志野)
Voiced by: Koichi Yamadera
Takeda (竹田)
Voiced by: Katsuhiro Tokuichi
Portrayed by: Yasushi Fuchikami
Bin Tabata (田端 敏, Tabata Bin)
Voiced by: Mitsuhiro Sakamaki

== Media ==
=== Manga ===
Written by Naoki Yamakawa and illustrated by Masashi Asaki, My Home Hero was serialized in Kodansha's seinen manga magazine Weekly Young Magazine from May 29, 2017, to July 29, 2024. Kodansha collected its chapters in 26 tankōbon volumes, released from September 6, 2017, to October 4, 2024.

The manga is licensed in North America by Kodansha USA. The first volume was released on February 28, 2023.

==== Volumes ====
No.	Original release date	Original ISBN	English release date	English ISBN
1	September 6, 2017	978-4-06-510139-1	February 28, 2023	978-1-68-491382-4
1. "Meeting My Daughter's Boyfriend" (娘の彼氏と初対面, Musume no Kareshi to Hatsu Taimen); 2. "My Wife Discovers the Crime Scene" (第一発見者・妻, Dai Ichi Hakken-sha Tsuma); 3. "From Today On, I Am a Killer" (今日から殺人鬼, Kyō Kara Satsujin-ki); 4. "Sushi Zanmai!" (すしざんまい！, Sushi Zanmai!); 5. "Being Watched (見張り!?", Mihari!?); 6. "Return to the Earth" (土に還す, Tsuchi ni Kaesu); 7. "20 Years of Teamwork" (20年目の共同作業, 20 Nen-me no Kyōdō Sagyō)
2	December 6, 2017	978-4-06-510543-6	March 28, 2023	978-1-68-491436-4
8. "My Ordinary Life and My Unordinary Life" (僕の日常と非日常, Boku no Nichijō to hi Nichijō); 9. "By Force" (強行突破, Kyōkō Toppa); 10. "Groping in the Dark" (暗中模索, Anchū Mosaku); 11. "The Correct Path" (正解への道, Seikai e no Dō); 12. "Eleventh-Hour Proposal" (土壇場の提案, Dotanba no Teian); 13. "Return to Normal Life" (日常への帰宅, Nichijō e no Kitaku); 14. "Nobuto's Girl" (延人のオンナ, Nobe-nin no Onna); 15. "Ten Million Yen?!" (1000万!?, 1000 Man!?); 16. "The World of Violence" (暴力の世界, Bōryoku no Sekai)
3	March 6, 2018	978-4-06-511107-9	April 25, 2023	978-1-68-491481-4
17. "The Second Time" (二度目, Ni Do-me); 18. "Are You Happy?" (幸せ？, Shiawase？); 19. "Security Question" (秘密の質問, Himitsu no Shitsumon); 20. "Two Fathers" (父親同士, Chichioya-dōshi); 21. "A Sudden Turn" (急転, Kyūten); 22. "Plan A" (第一の策, Dai ichi no Saku); 23. "Soil" (土, Do); 24. "Kasen's Hospitality" (歌仙流おもてなし, Kasen-ryū o Motenashi); 25. "One Day Left" (残り一日, Nokori Ichi Nichi)
4	June 6, 2018	978-4-06-511555-8	May 23, 2023	978-1-68-491769-3
26. "Mother and Mother" (母と母, Haha to Haha); 27. "Reika S Resolve" (零花の決意, Reika no Ketsui); 28. "The Right Choice" (正しい判断, Tadashii Handan); 29. "Thumb Turn" (サムターン回し, Samutān Mawashi); 30. "Als Flashlight" (ALSライト, ALS Raito); 31. "Spider Thread" (蜘蛛の糸, Kumo no Ito); 32. "Two Choices" (二択, Nitaku); 33. "The Last Supper" (最後の晩餐, Saigo no Bansan); 34. "Judgement Day" (話 運命の日, Hanashi Unmei no Hi)
5	September 6, 2018	978-4-06-512699-8	June 27, 2023	978-1-68-491770-9
35. "A Family of Our Own" (話 僕たちだけの家庭, Hanashi Bokutachi Dake no Katei); 36. "Paper Bag" (紙袋, Kamibukuro); 37. "Impossible!" (嘘だ！, Usoda!); 38. "Team Play" (夫妻のトリック, Fusai no Torikku); 39. "The Thing I Did" (話 僕がした一つのこと, Hanashi Boku ga Shita Hitotsu no Koto); 40. "Traces" (ベランダの傷, Beranda no Kizu); 41. "Revelation" (暴露, Bakuro); 42. "Father" (父親, Chichioya); 43. "Contingency" (想定外, Sōteigai)
6	January 4, 2019	978-4-06-514178-6	July 25, 2023	978-1-68-491771-6
44. "Mud Fight" (泥仕合, Doroshiai); 45. "Matori's Life" (麻取の人生, Matori no Jinsei); 46. "Meaning of Life" (生きる意味, Ikiru Imi); 47. "My Sin" (僕の罪, Boku no Tsumi); 48. "My Happiness (Part 1 Finale)" (今の幸せ, Ima no Shiawase); 49. "I Became Popular" (モテ期到来, Moteki Tōrai); 50. "An Honorable Adult" (真っ直ぐな大人, Massugu na Otona); 51. "Worst Case Scenario" (最悪の場合, Saiaku no Baai)
7	April 5, 2019	978-4-06-515194-5	August 22, 2023	978-1-68-491772-3
52. "Boyfriend Candidate? X2 (彼氏候補？×2, Kareshi Kōho? ×2); 53. "What Kind of Person is Your Father (お父さんはどんな人？, Otōsan wa Donna Hito?); 54. "Deal" (取引, Torihiki); 55. "As Husband and Wife" (夫婦二人で, Fūfu Futari de); 56. "Fate" (運命, Unmei); 57. "What Showed in the Video" (映っていたもの, Utsutte Ita Mono); 58. "The Last of a Friend" (友の最期, Tomo no Saigo); 59. "Testament" (遺言(ゆいごん), Yuigon); 60. "Kyoichi's Plan" (恭一(きょういち)の策, Kyōichi no Saku)
8	July 5, 2019	978-4-06-516365-8	September 26, 2023	978-1-68-491773-0
61. "A Cry of Sorrow" (どっちだ？, Docchi da?); 62. "Our Treasure" (田字草, Denjiso); 63. "Convergence" (信を捜せ, Shin o Sagase); 64. "Pursuit" (嫌な女, Iyana Onna); 65. "Act" (芝居, Shibai); 66. "Awful Woman" (追跡, Tsuiseki); 67. "Find Shin" (合流, Gōryū); 68. "Denjiso" (僕たちの宝物, Bokutachi no Takaramono); 69. "Which is It?" (悲痛な叫び, Hitsu na Sakebi)
9	November 6, 2019	978-4-06-517730-3	October 24, 2023	978-1-68-491774-7
70. "Emergency" (緊急事態, Kinkyū Jitai); 71. "Dining Out" (外食, Gaishoku); 72. "Investigation" (取り調べ, Torishirabe); 73. "Voluntary Accompaniment" (任意同行, Nin'i Dōkō); 74. "Secrets" (隠しごと, Kakushigoto); 75. "Corpse of a Man" (遺体の男, Itai no Otoko); 76. "Reckless" (デタラメ, Detarame); 77. "Before the Arrest" (捕まる前に, Tsukamaru Mae ni); 78. "Divine Eye" (オガミメ, Ogami Me)
10	February 6, 2020	978-4-06-518478-3	November 28, 2023	978-1-68-491775-4
79. "Countdown" (秒読み, Byōyomi); 80. "Two Requests" (二つの願い, Futatsu no Negai); 81. "Informer" (内通者, Naitsūsha); 82. "Real Culprit" (真犯人, Shinhan'nin); 83. "Fated Encounter" (巡り合い, Meguriai); 84. "Her Village" (彼女の村, Kanojo no Mura); 85. "Location of the Village" (村の場所, Mura no Basho); 86. "The Outside World" (外の世界, Soto no Sekai); 87. "Marriage Partner" (結婚相手, Kekkon Aite)
11	June 5, 2020	978-4-06-519993-0	December 26, 2023	978-1-68-491776-1
88. "Uneasy Happiness" (幸せへの違和感, Shiawase e no Iwakan); 89. "Rule of the Village" (村の掟, Mura no Okite); 90. "The Founder" (教祖様, Kyōso-sama); 91. "Endless Scripture" (エンドレス経典, Endoresu Kyōten); 92. "Arranged Marriage" (決められた結婚, Kimerareta Kekkon); 93. "Possession" (憑依, Hyōi); 94. "Blood Contract" (血判書, Keppansho); 95. "News" (ニュース, Nyūsu); 96. "Just Say it Honestly" (正直に言えよ, Shōjiki ni ie yo)
12	September 4, 2020	978-4-06-520690-4	January 23, 2024	978-1-68-491777-8
97. "Reika's Decision" (零花の決意, Reika no Ketsui); 98. "Meeting the Grandparents" (初対面の祖父母, Shotaimen no Sōfu-bo); 99. "Matsuda Tsukuyomi" (松田月夜見, Matsuda Tsukuyomi); 100. "Arrival" (入村, Nyūson); 101. "Since the Murder" (殺したから始まった, Koroshita Kara Hajimatta); 102. "Mother's Birthday Trauma" (母の誕生日はトラウマ, Haha no Tanjōbi wa Torauma); 103. "New Follower" (新たな従者, Aratana Jūsha); 104. "Reika's Seriousness" (零花の本気, Reika no Honki); 105. "Vivid Invasion" (鮮やかな侵入, Azayaka na Shin'nyū)
13	February 5, 2021	978-4-06-522303-1	February 27, 2024	978-1-68-491778-5
106. "This is Kubo" (これが窪, Kore ga Kubo); 107. "One More Meter" (あと1メートル, Ato Ichi Mētoru); 108. "Options Floating in His Head" (脳裏に浮かぶ選択肢, Nōri ni Ukabu Sentakushi); 109. "Please Forgive Them" (お許しください, Oyurushi Kudasai); 110. "Resolve" (覚悟, Kakugo); 111. "Tetsuo on the Move" (哲雄動く, Tetsuo Ugoku); 112. "Kai's Chance" (甲斐の機転, Kai no Kiten); 113. "Smoke and Chains" (煙と鎖, Kemuri to Kusari); 114. "Let's Give Up" (やめにしよう, Yameni Shiyō)
14	May 6, 2021	978-4-06-523348-1	March 26, 2024	978-1-68-491779-2
115. "Thank You" (ありがとう, Arigatō); 116. "Divine Punishment" (天罰, Tenbatsu); 117. "What I Really Want" (本心, Honshin); 118. "The Festival Begins" (祭りの始まり, Matsuri no Hajimari); 119. "Ogamime Arrives" (オガミメご降臨, Ogamime go Kōrin); 120. "Sorry" (すまない, Sumanai); 121. "Oversight" (見落とし, Miotoshi); 122. "Homecoming" (里帰り, Satogaeri); 123. "In the Attic" (屋根裏, Yaneura)
15	August 5, 2021	978-4-06-524355-8	April 23, 2024	978-1-68-491780-8
124. "Let's Kill Him" (殺そう, Korosō); 125. "I Knew" (わかってる, Wakatteru); 126. "The Second Shot" (二度目の発射, Nidome no Hassha); 127. "The Gunshot that Started the War" (戦争開始の銃声, Sensō Kaishi no Jūsei); 128. "Wild Hunt" (山狩り, Yamagari); 129. "Conditions for Victory" (勝利条件, Shōri Jōken); 130. "Family" (ファミリー, Famirī); 131. "One Man Left" (あと一人だけ, Ato Hitori Dake); 132. "It's My Turn Now" (今度は私の番, Kondo wa Watashi no Ban)
16	November 5, 2021	978-4-06-525840-8	May 28, 2024	978-1-68-491781-5
133. "Kocho and Kasen" (胡蝶と歌仙, Kochō to Kasen); 134. "Pachinko Balls" (パチンコ玉, Pachinko-dama); 135. "Armory" (武器庫, Buki-ko); 136. "Pop's Order" (親父の指揮, Oyaji no Shiki); 137. "All of Pops'" (親父の全て, Oyaji no Subete); 138. "Satake Tatsumi" (佐武辰巳, Satake Tatsumi); 139. "Exposed Tactics" (暴かれた策略, Abakareta Sakuryaku); 140. "Pursuit" (追及, Tsuikyū); 141. "The Value of Life" (命の価値, Inochi no Kachi)
17	February 4, 2022	978-4-06-526783-7	June 25, 2024	978-1-68-491782-2
142. "The End of the World" (世の終末, Yo no Shūmatsu); 143. "Crime and Resolve" (罪と決断, Tsumi to Ketsudan); 144. "Atonement" (贖罪, Shokuzai); 145. "Battle Start" (開戦, Kaisen); 146. "Their Conversation" (二人の対話, Futari no Taiwa); 147. "Tetsuo Tosu" (鳥栖哲雄, Tosu Tetsuo); 148. "It's Your Win" (お前の勝ちだ, Omae no Kachi da); 149. "I Love You" (愛してる, Aishiteru); 150. "Being a Family" (家族であること, Kazoku de Aru Koto)
18	October 6, 2022	978-4-06-529426-0	September 24, 2024	978-1-68-491783-9
151. "7 Years Later" (7年後, Nana-nen go); 152. "Akira and Reika" (明と零花, Akira to Reika); 153. "Suspect and Father" (容疑者・父, Yōgisha, Chichi); 154. "Pursuit of the Real Criminal" (真犯人の追撃, Shinhan'nin no Tsuigeki); 155. "Unannounced Incoming Call" (非通知の着信, Hitsuuchi no Chakushin); 156. "My Burning Home" (燃えるマイホーム, Moeru Mai Hōmu); 157. "Invincible Purpose" (不敵な目的, Futeki na Mokuteki); 158. "Father, Move" (父、動く, Chichi, Ugoku)
19	January 6, 2023	978-4-06-530380-1	December 24, 2024	979-8-88-933465-1
159. "Hidden Things" (隠しごと, Kakushigoto); 160. "The Connected Truth" (つながった真実, Tsunagatta Shinjitsu); 161. "Village Today" (村の現在, Mura no Genzai); 162. "Mysterious Letter" (謎の手紙, Nazo no Tegami); 163. "I Don't Know, Dad" (私の知らない、お父さん, Watashi no Shiranai, Otōsan); 164. "Traces" (痕跡, Konseki); 165. "Revisited" (再訪, Saihō); 166. "Kie Tosu" (鳥栖キエ, Tosu Kie)
20	April 6, 2023	978-4-06-531351-0	February 25, 2025	979-8-88-933658-7
167. "Kubo's Challenge" ("窪"の挑戦状, "Kubo" no Chōsenjō); 168. "Zeroka's Determination" (零花の決意, Zeroka no Ketsui); 169. "Stella's Mansion" (ステラズマンション, Suterazu Manshon); 170. "Detective's Intuition and Daughter Kang" (刑事の勘と娘のカン, Keiji no Kan to Musume no Kan); 171. "Detective Wall Don" (壁ドン刑事, Kabe-don Keiji); 172. "Countdown....?" (カウントダウン‥‥？, Kauntodaun...?); 173. "Point 0" (0地点, Zero Chiten); 174. "Utasen's Determination" (歌仙の覚悟, Utasen no Kakugo)
21	June 6, 2023	978-4-06-532028-0	July 15, 2025	979-8-88-933659-4
175. "300 m^{3} Bomb" (300㎥の爆弾, 300 m^{3} no Bakudan); 176. "Multilingual Girl" (マルチリンガル・ガール, Maruchiringaru Gāru); 177. "The Negotiator" (ネゴシエイター, Negoshieitā); 178. "300 m^{3} Bomb" (300㎥の爆弾, 300 m^{3} no Bakudan); 179. "Reunion After 7 Years" (7年越しの再会, 7-nen Goshi no Saikai); 180. "The Unopened Room" (開かずの部屋, Akazu no Heya); 181. "White or Black?" (白か、黒か──？, Shiro ka, Kuro ka?); 182. "Hidden Things" (隠しごと, Kakushigoto)
22	September 6, 2023	978-4-06-533055-5	September 16, 2025	979-8-89-478274-4
183. "Taisei Kobori" (小堀大成, Kobori Taisei); 184. "Talent" (才能, Sainō); 185. "The Evil Protagonist" (悪の主人公, Aku no Shujinkō); 186. "The First Proposal" (第1回目のプロポーズ, Dai 1 kai-me no Puropōzu); 187. "The Convenient Man" (都合のいい男, Tsugō no ii Otoko); 188. "New Life" (新生活, Shin Seikatsu); 189. "Misjudgment" (判断ミス, Handan Misu); 190. "Sudden Incoming Call" (突然の着信, Totsuzen no Chakushin)
23	February 6, 2024	978-4-06-534297-8	December 16, 2025	979-8-89-478275-1
191. "After the Incident" (事件直後, Jiken Chokugo); 192. "The Fourth Family Member" (4人目の家族, 4-ninme no Kazoku); 193. "Fighting to Protect" (守るための戦い, Mamoru tame no Tatakai); 194. "Under the Surface" (水面下, Suimenka); 195. "The Reunion of Their Dreams" (夢見た再会, Yumemita Saikai); 196. "A Conversation After Seven Years" (七年目の対話, 7-nenme no Taiwa); 197. "Hot Shot" (hot shot, Hot shot); 198. "The Continuation of "That Day"" (あの日の続き, Ano hi no Tsuzuki)
24	April 5, 2024	978-4-06-535246-5	April 14, 2026	979-8-89-478276-8
199. "Loved One" (想い人, Omoibito); 200. "A Chance Meeting in the Forest" (すれちがい、森, Surechigai, Mori); 201. "Solving the Riddle" (怪答, Kaitō); 202. "A Life-or-Death Plea" (決死の大論説, Kesshi no Dairon Setsu); 203. "Scars" (傷痕, Shōkon); 204. "My Only Family" (唯一の家族, Yuiitsu no Kazoku); 205. "A Journalist's Mistake" (ある記者の粗相, Aru Kisha no Sosō); 206. "The Cycle of Revenge" (復讐の連鎖, Fukushū no Rensa); 207. "Seven Years Later (B-Side)" (7年後（B－SIDE）, 7-nen go (Bi Saido))
25	July 5, 2024	978-4-06-536275-4	June 16, 2026	979-8-89-478277-5
208. "Behint-the-Scenes "Terrorists"" ("テロ"の内幕, "Tero" no Uchimaku); 209. "Disposing of Shino" (志野の始末, Shino no Shimatsu); 210. "A Chain of Suspicion" (連鎖する疑心, Rensa Suru Gishin); 211. "Probing" (探り合い, Saguriai); 212. "Battle of Wits" (空中戦, Kūchūsen); 213. "Monster" (化け物, Bakemono); 214. "Schemer vs. Schemer" (策士vs．策士, Sakushi vs. Sakushi); 215. "Sorry, Okay?" (ごめんな？, Gomen na?); 216. "Blunder" (不覚, Fukaku)
26	October 4, 2024	978-4-06-537256-2	August 18, 2026	979-8-89-478545-5
217. "Final Wish" (最後の願い, Saigo no Negai); 218. "Cornered Rat" (窮鼠, Kyūsō); 219. "End It" (俺が終わらせる, Ore ga Owaraseru); 220. "The Final Shot" (最後の一撃, Saigo no Ichigeki); 221. "Crime and its Ends" (罪の行く末, Tsumi no Yukusue); 222. "A Good Dad" (いいお父さん, Ii Otōsan); 223. "If..." (もしも‥‥, Moshimo...); Final chapter "My Home Hero" (マイホームヒーロー, Mai Hōmu Hīrō)

=== Anime ===
An anime television series adaptation was announced on June 19, 2022. The series is produced by Tezuka Productions and directed by Takashi Kamei, with scripts written by Kōhei Kiyasu, character designs by Masatsune Noguchi, and music composed by Kenji Kawai. It aired from April 2 to June 18, 2023, on Tokyo MX and BS NTV. The opening theme song is "Ai no Uta" (愛の歌; "Song of Love") by Chiai Fujikawa, while the ending theme song is "Decided" by Dizzy Sunfist.

Crunchyroll licensed the series for streaming outside of Asia, and the namesake company released it on a Blu-ray Disc set on May 28, 2024. Medialink licensed the series in South, Southeast Asia and Oceania (except Australia and New Zealand), streaming it on its Ani-One Asia YouTube channel.

==== Episodes ====
No.	Title	Directed by (Note: Information is taken from the ending credits of each episode.)	Written by	Storyboarded by	Original release date
1	"From Today, I Am a Killer"; Transliteration: "Kyō kara Satsujinki" (Japanese: 今日から殺人鬼)	Yuri Uema	Kōhei Kiyasu	Takashi Kamei	April 2, 2023
Tetsuo Tosu meets his daughter Reika for lunch and discovers that her boyfriend Nobuto is physically abusing her. While tailing Nobuto and his friends one day, Tetsuo is seen and beaten up by a man who threatens to kill him if he talks to the police. Tetsuo spends the night in an internet cafe, then returns to Reika's apartment the next day seeking clues about Nobuto. However, Nobuto arrives so Tetsuo hides in a closet where he hears Nobuto talking over the phone about killing other people and how he plans to get money out of Reika before getting rid of her. About to be discovered, Tetsuo bursts from closet and beats Nobuto to death with a rice cooker. Tetsuo's wife, Kasen, arrives at the apartment and after rationalizing that Tetsuo killed Nobuto in self-defense, the two of them decide to clean up the mess and get rid of the body. Reika returns to the apartment and Kasen convinces her daughter to stay with her so Tetsuo can deal with the body. However, Kubo, another of the gang members enters the apartment looking for Nobuto while Tetsuo is still there and Nobuto's corpse is laying in the bathtub.
2	"'Cutting the Cake'"; Transliteration: "Nijūnenme no Kyōdō Sagyō" (Japanese: 20年目の共同作業)	Shintarō Matsui	Kōhei Kiyasu	Takashi Kamei	April 9, 2023
When Kubo enters the apartment looking for Nobuto, Tetsuo pretends to be a cleaner called Suzuki on his regular duties and convinces him to leave. Tetsuo uses his technical knowledge to boil Nobuto's body in the bathtub and then when it has reduced in size, transports it home in a large suitcase provided by Kasen. Meanwhile, Reika is followed to her parents' home by Kubo and Kyoichi accompanied by Shingo. When Tetsuo goes to buys garden supplies to quickly decompose the body, Kubo opens his car boot and the suitcase only to find it packed with clothing, although Tetsuo deduces, he has been followed. Back at home, Shingo pretends to be an estate agent and offers to appraise their home, while Kubo enters the house but finds nothing. Later, Tetsuo and Kasen find a listening device in their home and act out a staged conversation about someone stalking Reika who may have harmed Nobuto, prompting Shingos' group to quit their surveillance. Tetsuo and Kasen then successfully bury Nobuto's remains in their garden. However, that night, some of Shingos' gang break in and capture Kasen while Tetsuo is grabbed on his way home.
3	"The Correct Path"; Transliteration: "Seikai e no Michi" (Japanese: 正解への道)	Shintarō Matsui	Kōhei Kiyasu	Takashi Kamei	April 16, 2023
A flashback shows Tetsuo and Kasen are aware that Nobuto's gang are investigating them, meanwhile Kyoichi plans to question them about Nobuto. In the present, Tetsuo is bound with his head covered by a bag while Kyoichi beats and threatens to kill him. In desperation, Tetsuo says that he hired a man called Suzuki to investigate Nobuto. The crew with Kasen also questions her, and she tells the same story which Tetsuo had developed earlier, convincing them that she knows nothing about Nobuto's disappearance. Kyoichi reports the results to Kubo, but with nothing to show for his risky operation, Kubo demotes Kyoichi and puts Takeda in charge. In frustration, Kyoichi prepares to kill Tetsuo and blame him for Nobuto's death. However, Tetsuo suggests that if Nobuto returns it will look bad and offers to do everything he can to help Kyoichi locate Nobuto.
4	"The World of Violence"; Transliteration: "Bōryoku no Sekai" (Japanese: 暴力の世界)	Daisuke Shimamura	Kōhei Kiyasu	Takashi Kamei	April 23, 2023
Kyoichi agrees to work with Tetsuo to find Nobuto, but threatens to kill him and frame him for murdering Nobuto if they cannot do so by the deadline of Friday, however Tetsuo does not share this information with Kasen. After considering his options, Tetsuo decides to create the impression that Nobuto is still alive. They interview Nobuto's girlfriend Hibiki at the club where she works and she mentions Nobuto's exploitation of Reika, enraging Tetsuo, however he manages to extract some useful information from her – Nobuto ripped off his gang by carrying out a pre-planned robbery himself. As Tetsuo and Kyoichi are about to leave they are coerced into carrying out a job for the club owners, to intercept a transaction between two violent gangs, the Ryuken-gumi and the Ouko-tai. At the meeting point on a deserted road, Kyoichi realizes that they are doomed and tries to drive off, but he is shot and wounded as they try to escape.
5	"Are You Happy?"; Transliteration: "Shiawase?" (Japanese: 幸せ？)	Hiromichi Matano	Kōhei Kiyasu	Takashi Kamei	April 30, 2023
The leader of Kyoichi's gang painfully removes the bullet from his chest. He then films Tetsuo as he is forced to confess killing one of the other gang members as insurance against him divulging the gang's actions. Back home, Tetsuo tells Kasen that his only chance to survive their predicament is to convince the gang that Nobuto is still alive. He suggests using their old college friend Bin Tabata who is currently involved in video production, and Kasen convinces Tabata to act out a small scenario wearing Nobuto's clothes. Meanwhile, Tetsuo tries to unlock Nobuto's phone but it requires a pet's name which Tetsuo cannot guess. He goes to the bar which Nobuto frequented searching for clues, and strikes up a conversation with a man who is despairing about his son's disappearance and says his name is Yoshitatsu Matori and Tetsuo blurts out that his name is Tabata. After the man leaves, the bartender reveals to Tetsuo that he is Nobuto's father.
6	"Entertaining the Guest, Kasen Style"; Transliteration: "Kasen-ryū Omotenashi" (Japanese: 歌仙流おもてなし)	Fumio Maezono	Kōhei Kiyasu	Takashi Kamei	May 7, 2023
Tetsuo and Kasen manage guess Nobuto's password and unlock his phone. They post the video they made with Tabata showing Nobuto from the rear and then add a comment from Nobuto's phone indicating he is still alive but in hiding. However, Kyoichi's gang suspect the video is a fake as Nobuto's gait is uncharacteristic. Kyoichi drags Tetsuo back to his home to investigate a large pot that he recalled filled with earth but had nothing planted in it. He forces Tetsuo to tip it out but it only contains earth – Kasen had overhead Kyoichi through the phone in Tetsuo's bag and removed the evidence. As Kyoichi rummages through the dirt, Kasen surprisingly returns and invites them in for coffee, After drinking it, Kyoichi rushes to the bathroom as Kasen had added a laxative, however it also effects Tetsuo preventing him from accessing Kyoichi's laptop. Reika unexpectedly arrives home and Kyoichi asks her about Nobuto.
7	"Mother and Mother"; Transliteration: "Haha to Haha" (Japanese: 母と母)	Yuri Uema	Kōhei Kiyasu	Takashi Kamei	May 14, 2023
As Kyoichi leaves the Tetsuo house, he leaves a note in Reika's shoe for her to contact him. While Kyoichi was in the bathroom, Kasen had secretly installed a keylogger on Kyoichi's laptop, enabling her to access his emails. When she checks via her phone, she finds that he plans to kill Tetsuo and then frame him for Nobuto's disappearance and possible death. Kasen decides to implement plan "B" and goes to Kyoichi's family home to plant a bag of evidence pointing to Nobuto's demise. She meets Kyoichi's mother who has had a hard life herself, and so she decides not to leave the evidence. Meanwhile, Tetsuo slips out of Kyoichi's handcuffs and meets Kasen. Together they devise a plan to leave the bag of evidence at Kyoichi's apartment. However, just as Tetsuo arrives in the foyer with the bag, Kyoichi emerges from the elevator.
8	"The Spider's Thread"; Transliteration: "Kumo no Ito" (Japanese: 蜘蛛の糸)	Takuo Suzuki	Kōhei Kiyasu	Takashi Kamei	May 21, 2023
Tetsuo avoids being seen by Kyoichi in the foyer. He then tries to enter Kyoichi's apartment to leave Nobuto's remains, but he cannot pick the lock and returns home just before Kyoichi arrives back. When Kyoichi discovers an email was sent from his account, he is perplexed so Tetsuo suggests that he may be being investigated by Takeda who suspects Kyoichi of killing Nobuto. He suggests that Takeda may have planted evidence in his apartment, so Koichi drags Tetsuo with him to his apartment to investigate. They find nothing amiss, but Tetsuo begins to realize that Kyoichi is more clever and ruthless than he anticipated, making his situation more precarious.
9	"The Fateful Day"; Transliteration: "Unmei no Hi" (Japanese: 運命の日)	Daisuke Shimamura	Kōhei Kiyasu	Takashi Kamei	May 28, 2023
Kyoichi takes Tetsuo with him to report back to Takeda that he has not found evidence of Nobuto's disappearance. While there, Takeda receives a provocative email suggesting that the yakuza are incompetent and that Nobuto and Koichi masterminded an armored car robbery 18 months ago. They search Nobuto's apartment and find a lot of cash and then call in Kubo to supervise a search of Koichi's apartment. They find some money, however there is also a bag containing human skeletal remains which Koichi has never seen. Koichi tries to blame Tetsuo and Takeda but he has no proof, and Kubo decides that Koichi has to take the blame for Nobuto's demise. It is then revealed that Tetsuo arranged for Kasen to place Nobuto's remains there and also sent the email to frame Kyoichi.
10	"One Thing I Did"; Transliteration: "Boku ga Shita Hitotsu no Koto" (Japanese: 僕がした1つのこと)	Shintarō Matsui	Kōhei Kiyasu	Takashi Kamei; Shintarō Matsui	June 4, 2023
Tetsuo leaves Kyoichi to his fate with Kubo and heads to Reika's apartment where he collapses from exhaustion. A flashback shows Kasen following Tetsuo's plan to enter Kyoichi's apartment from the rooftop and plant Nobuto's remains in the safe after using a combination of technology and guesswork to discover the combination. Meanwhile, in a desperate bid to survive, Kyoichi breaks free from his captors and manages to escape although re-opening his bullet wound. He then pieces together the events leading up to the discovery of Nobuto's remains in his safe and concludes that Tetsuo must have somehow planted the evidence to frame him. He then telephones Matori and says that Tetsuo killed Nobuto.
11	"Father"; Transliteration: "Chichioya" (Japanese: 父親)	Takuo Suzuki	Kōhei Kiyasu	Takashi Kamei	June 11, 2023
Kyoichi tries to convince Matori over the phone that he is innocent, believing that Tetsuo killed Nobuto and collaborated with Kasen to plant the evidence against him. Later, Matori enters Reika's apartment with an ALS torch and finds what he believes are traces of Nobuto's blood. Fearing being discovered, Tetsuo emerges from hiding in the closet and confesses his guilt to Matori who threatens to kill him after he tortures and kills his family. Tetsuo snaps and attacks Matori, even after being hit with pepper spray. The noise of the ensuing violent struggle causes the downstairs neighbors to call the police who arrive outside the building as Matori begins to strangle Tetsuo with a cord.
12	"The Current Happiness"; Transliteration: "Ima no Shiawase" (Japanese: 今の幸せ)	Takashi Kamei	Kōhei Kiyasu	Takashi Kamei	June 18, 2023
As Matori strangles Tetsuo, they both think about their children. When Matori thinks of Nobuto, he relaxes his grip allowing to Tetsuo break free. Acknowledging his failures as a father, a business man, and as a person, Matori suddenly stabs himself in the stomach with a kitchen knife. However, he reminds Tetsuo that if he fails to return, his gang will know Tetsuo was the culprit all along and kill both him and his family in revenge for his death. Just then, the police knock on the door to investigate the disturbance. Tetsuo manages to convince them to leave while he prevents Matori from speaking, and the yakuza bleeds to death. Tetsuo cleans up the apartment, putting Matori's body in the bathtub. When Kubo comes to investigate, he finds nothing amiss and reports to Tatsumi that Matori has left, closing the chapter. Later that night, Tetsuo buries Matori's corpse in the woods and returns home the next morning. Kasen is angry that he did not come home for dinner but Tetsuo does not tell her what happened. The Tosu's family life returns to normal in spite of the recent dramatic events which threatened to destroy their family.

=== Live-action ===
A live-action television drama and live-action film was announced on August 21, 2023. Both adaptations are directed by Takahiro Aoyama. The ten-episode television drama was broadcast on MBS and TBS' Dramaism programming block from October 25 to December 20, 2023. (Note: MBS listed the air dates for the series on Tuesday at 24:59, which is effectively Wednesday at 0:59 a.m. JST.) The live-action film premiered in Japanese theatres on March 8, 2024.

== Reception ==
By June 2022, the manga had over 2 million copies in circulation.

Erwan Lafleuriel of IGN France called the first volume of My Home Hero a "very effective thriller" and compared its premise to the American television series Breaking Bad.

== See also ==
- I'm Standing on a Million Lives, another manga series written by Naoki Yamakawa
