= Holiday Romance =

Holiday Romance or A Holiday Romance may refer to:

- A Holiday Romance, 1999 American Christmas romantic film
- "Holiday Romance", 1974 song from the album Soap Opera by the Kinks
- "Holiday Romance", an 1868 collection of Charles Dickens short stories

== See also ==
- Holiday Affair, 1949 American Christmas romantic film, and the remake Holiday Affair (1996 film)
- Holiday Love, Japanese manga series
