= List of High-Rise Invasion volumes =

High-Rise Invasion (天空侵犯, Tenkū Shinpan) is a Japanese manga series written by Tsuina Miura and illustrated by Takahiro Oba. It was serialized online in DeNA's Manga Box app from December 2013 to April 2019. Kodansha held the license to publish the series and compiled it into twenty-one tankōbon volumes, while Seven Seas Entertainment published it in two-in-one omnibus volumes in North America from June 2018 to October 2021. A sequel manga, titled High-Rise Invasion Arrive, was serialized in Kodansha's Magazine Pocket website and app from July 2019 to April 2021.

== Volumes ==
=== High-Rise Invasion ===
No.	Original release date	Original ISBN	English release date	English ISBN
1–2	May 9, 2014; September 9, 2014	978-4-06-376979-1 (volume 1); 978-4-06-377056-8 (volume 2)	June 12, 2018	978-1-626927-66-7
Chapters in volume 1; 1. "Incomprehensible World" (訳のわかんない世界, Wake no wakan'nai sekai); 2. "Maybe... Understand Me?" (もしかして… 話 通じる？, Moshikashite… -banashi tsūjiru?); 3. "I Don't Want Her To Die!" (殺されちゃったら いやだ!!, Korosa re chattara iyada!!); 4. "The Administrator" (管理者, Kanrisha); 5. "Ha..." (あはっ…, A hatsu…); 6. "A World For Forcing Suicide by Jumping" (飛び降り自殺させるための世界, Tobiori jisatsu sa seru tame no sekai); 7. "I Have More Than Two Choices!" (二択じゃない!!, Ni-taku janai!!); 8. "Maybe I Can Escape This World" (この世界から出られるかも, Kono sekai kara de rareru kamo); 9. "I'm Invincible In This World" (この世界では無敵, Kono sekaide wa muteki); 10. "White Grim Reaper" (白い死神, Shiroi shinigami); 11. "This Is Totally Normal!" (全然フツーじゃん!!, Zenzen futsūjan!!); 12. "I've Shot That In A Video Game Before!" (ゲームで撃ったことあるし！, Gēmu de utta koto arushi!); 13. "I've Never Liked This Type Before!" (あんまり好きなタイプじゃないけど, Anmari sukina Taipu janaikedo); 14. "School Regulations Suck!" (校則ってサイテー！, Kōsoku tte saitē!); 15. "This Is The Most Certain Way!" (この方法が確実！, Kono hōhō ga kakujitsu!); 16. "I'm Definitely Going To Shoot..." (絶対に撃ち殺…, Zettai ni uchi ya…); Chapters in volume 2; 17. "The Right Of Jumping Off The Building" (飛び降り自殺する権利, Tobiori jisatsu suru kenri); 18. "But Still" (それでも, Soredemo); 19. "This Mask Can Be A Real Threat" (この仮面はマジでヤバい, Kono kamen wa majide yabai); 20. "I'm Going To Die!" (私 死んじゃうもん！, Watashi shin jau mon!); 21. "A Maid In A Mask" (メイド仮面さん, Meido Kamen-san); 22. "With My Left Hand" (左手で, Hidarite de); 23. "The Next Weapon Must Be..." (次の仮面の武器は, Tsugi no Kamen no buki wa); 24. "I'm A Genius!!" (私 天才!!, Watashi tensai!!); 25. "Against The Mask" (対仮面, Tai Kamen); 26. "For You" (あなたのために, Anata no tame ni); 27. "This Is It Then..." (これで…お別れね, Kore de… o wakare ne); 28. "The Ridiculous World & Rules" (このふざけた世界を, Kono fuzaketa sekai o); 29. "The Memory Of That Day" (あの時の記憶, Ano toki no kioku); 30. "More Than One Of Them" (独りじゃない, Hitori janai); 31. "This Is Better Than That..." (明るいほうから, Akarui hō kara); 32. "Little Hope" (この私が, Kono watashi ga); 33. "Hehe! Hya He!" (ヒ～ヒ！ ヒャヒッ!!, Hi~hi! Hyahi~tsu!!); 34. "And?" (で？, De?)
3–4	January 9, 2015; May 8, 2015	978-4-06-377111-4 (volume 3); 978-4-06-377190-9 (volume 4)	September 18, 2018	978-1-626928-58-9
Chapters in volume 3; 35. "I Am Sure..." (絶対に！, Zettai ni!); 36. "I Remember The Thing I Should Do" (思い出したオレのやるべきことを, Omoide shita ore no yarubeki koto o); 37. "Okay, I Understand" (うん わかった, Un wakatta); 38. "Sorry Mayuko Nise-san" (ごめんね 二瀬真由子さん, Gomen ne Nise Mayuko-san); 39. "Such An Uncool Name" (ダッサイ名前, Dassai namae); 40. "I'm... Already..." (オレは…すでに…, Ore wa… sudeni…); 41. "Please Let My Brother Be Okay" (死んじゃいませんように, Shinja imasen yō ni); 42. "Sportsmanship" (スポーツマンシップ, Supōtsumanshippu); 43. "I'd Better Not Freak Out Anymore" (ビビるのはここまでだ, Bibiru no wa koko madeda); 44. "The Important Secret Of This World" (この世界の重大な秘密, Kono sekai no jūdaina himitsu); 45. "With Our Own Hands!" (オレたち兄妹の手で, Ore-tachi kyōdai no te de); 46. "Nomura's Observation Notes" (野村少年の考察ノート, Nomura shōnen no kōsatsu nōto); 47. "The Third Mask" (第3の仮面, Dai 3 no kamen); 48. "Thanks!" (ありがとっ！, Arigato~tsu!); 49. "I Can Get Satisfaction With Her" (あの娘のモノなら満たされる, Ano musume no mononara mitasareru); 50. "The Organ For Creation" (誕生だすための機関, Tanjō dasu tame no kikan); 18.5. "Who will...?" (誰か私を…, Dare ka watashi o…): Chapters in volume 4; 51. "The Duty Of Angels" (天使の義務, Tenshi no gimu); 52. "The Name Of This Girl" (この女の名前は, Kono on'na no namae wa); 53. "Exceeded" (上回った, Uwamawatta); 54. "It's Supposed To Be..." (なのだけれど？, Na nodakeredo?); 55. "That Black Building" (黒いビル, Kuroi Biru); 56. "By The Way" (ところで, Tokorode); 57. "God's Code" (神のコード, Kami no kōdo); 58. "The President" (社長, Shachō); 59. "He's The Main Character?" (主人公…ですか？, Shujinkō…desu ka?); 60. "Doesn't Recognise" (存在を知らない, Sonzai o shiranai); 61. "I Do Like You" (あなたのことが好きよ, Anata no koto ga suki yo)
5–6	August 7, 2015; November 9, 2015	978-4-06-377292-0 (volume 5); 978-4-06-377349-1 (volume 6)	December 31, 2018	978-1-626929-56-2
Chapters in volume 5; 62. "The Friend's Voice" (痛くはしないでね？, Itaku wa shinaide ne?); 63. "I'd Rather Become A Doll" (たとえ人形になってでも, Tatoe ningyō ni natte demo); 64. "Who Became Closer To God" (神に近づいた者, Kami ni chikadzuita mono); 65. "He Showed Up" (奴が現れた, Yatsu ga arawareta); 66. "He's Not Listening" (人の話を聞いてないっ！, Hito no hanashi o kiitenai~tsu!); 67. "I Will Do Anything" (私はなんだってする, Watashi wa nan datte suru); 68. "I'll Prepare The Warning Shots" (威嚇射撃の用意ですわっ！, Ikaku shageki no yōi de suwatsu!); 69. "My Strongest Weapon" (私の最強必殺技, Watashi no saikyō hissawwaza); 70. "Gufu... Gu fu fu fu!" (ぐふっ…ぐふふっ！, Gufutsu… gufu futsu!); 71. "Ikebukuro" (池袋, Ikebukuro); 72. "Forever and Ever" (いつまでもこのままで, Itsu made mo kono mama de); Chapters in volume 6; 73. "The Story Of Yoshida-kun" (吉田くんの話, Yoshida-kun no hanashi); 74. "Good Luck" (がんばってください, Ganbatte kudasai); 75. "Everybody Knows That" (そんなの常識, Son'na no jōshiki); 76. "I'm Still All Right" (まだ大丈夫, Mada daijōbu); 77. "The Masked Man With A Sniper" (スナイパーの仮面, Sunaipā no kamen); 78. "The Oldest Memory" (最も古い記憶, Mottomo furui kioku); 79. "Why I Happened To Wear A Mask..." (何故オレは仮面を被ってしまったのか, Naze ore wa kamen o kabutte shimatta no ka); 80. "Salvation" (救い, Sukui); 81. "The Number Of Angels That Person Can Manipulate" (アノカタが操れる天使の人数, Anokata ga ayatsureru tenshi no ninzū); 82. "You're Going To Be All Right, Honjo-San The Assailant is Nothing But Reckless..." (本城さんなら大丈夫, Honjō-san'nara daijōbu); 83. "I Was Lucky To Meet You" (あなたに逢えて良かった, Anata ni aete yokatta)
7–8	February 9, 2016; May 9, 2016	978-4-06-377422-1 (volume 7); 978-4-06-377461-0 (volume 8)	May 7, 2019	978-1-642750-77-5
Chapters in volume 7; 84. "Hibernation" (ハイバネーション, Haibanēshon); 85. "Traveling Alone For The First Time In A Long Time" (久しぶりの一人旅, Hisashiburi no hitoritabi); 86. "Rebuttal Will Be Overruled" (反論は却下致します, Hanron wa kyakka itashimasu); 87. "Obstacle" (試練, Shiren); 88. "Those People" (あのひとたち, Ano hito-tachi); 89. "With Everyone" (みんなで, Min'nade); 90. "Achievement Test" (学力テスト, Gakuryoku Tesuto); 91. "Yep. I Found Them!" (はい発見♪, Hai hakken); 92. "Dangerous Existence" (危険な存在, Kiken'na sonzai); 93. "My Obligation As Brother" (兄の義務, Ani no gimu); 94. "Meetup" (合流, Gōryū); Chapters in volume 8; 95. "Run Along Smoothly" (順調に進行中, Junchō ni shinkō-chū); 96. "Run!" (逃げろ！, Nigero!); 97. "Nothing Has Changed" (これじゃ今までと変わらない, Kore ja imamade to kawaranai); 98. "Honjo-Kun's Little Sister" (本城くんの妹さん, Honjō-kun no imōto-san); 99. "The Legendary Heroine" (伝説の女勇者, Densetsu no on'na yūsha); 100. "Howling" (叫び, Sakebi); 101. "A Troublesome High School Girl" (世話の焼ける女子高生, Sewanoyakeru mesukōsei); 102. "Something Is Odd, Something Is..." (何かがおかしい 何かが, Nanikagaokashī nanika ga); 103. "Hello" (こんにちは, Kon'nichiwa); 104. "We Can Make It! We Can Make It!" (イケます！ イケますわぁっ！, Ikemasu! Ikemasu watsu!); 105. "Every World" (全ての世界, Subete no sekai)
9–10	August 9, 2016; November 9, 2016	978-4-06-377499-3 (volume 9); 978-4-06-393073-3 (volume 10)	September 24, 2019	978-1-642757-02-6
Chapters in volume 9; 106. "He's Really An Annoying Bastard" (マジでムカつくクソ野郎, Majide mukatsuku kuso yarō); 107. "Trial" (トライアル, Toraiaru); 108. "The Guardian Angels" (守護天使, Shugo tenshi); 109. "There's No Decency Left In The World" (世も末とはこのことか, Yomosue to hako no koto ka); 110. "What I Am Now" (今の自分, Ima no jibun); 111. "Why?" (なんで？, Nande); 112. "True Evil" (真の邪悪, Shin no jaaku); 113. "While He Says It Is Justice..." (それが正義だと言いながら, Sore ga seigida to iinagara); 114. "You Wanted To Pee Badly" (すっごいオシッコしたい, Suggoi oshikkoshitai); 115. "Cautious..." (警戒心, Keikaishin); 116. "Not Strong From The Beginning" (最初から強かった訳じゃない, Saisho kara tsuyokatta wake janai); Chapters in volume 10; 117. "That Hostage Is..." (その人質とは, Sono hitojichi to wa); 118. "Hey, Yayoi-chan" (なぁ弥生ちゃんよぉ, Nā Yayoi-chan yo); 119. "Someone Who Is Older Than Me And Reliable" (頼れる年上, Tayoreru toshiue); 120. "Out Of Curiosity" (好奇心, Kōkishin); 121. "Destructive Power Scale" (破壊力スケール, Hakai-ryoku Sukēru); 122. "Ahh!" (嗚呼！, Aa!); 123. "Let It All Out" (全てを吐き出させる, Subete o hakidasa seru); 124. "Brother's Little Sister" (お兄ちゃんの妹, O nīchan no imōto); 125. "Fight For What?" (なんのために戦う, Nan no tame ni tatakau); 126. "My Feelings" (思い, Omoi); 127. "Everything Doesn't Make Sense" (おかしいでしょ 何もかも, Okashīdesho nanimokamo)
11–12	February 9, 2017; May 9, 2017	978-4-06-393137-2 (volume 11); 978-4-06-393187-7 (volume 12)	April 28, 2020	978-1-64505-185-5
Chapters in volume 11; 128. "The Assassination Plan to Kill the Naval Style Uniform Girl" (セーラー服暗殺計画, Sērā-fuku ansatsu keikaku); 129. "The Great Angel" (大天使, Dai tenshi); 130. "I'll Go on to the Story" (話を続けましょう, Hanashi o tsudzuke mashou); 131. "The Strong" (強者, Tsuwamono); 132. "You Look Less Energetic" (元気が無いカンジ, Genki ga nai kanji); 133. "I Will Keep Talking" (話を続けるわ, Hanashi o tsudzukeru wa); 134. "My Emotion is About to Explode" (感情が爆発しそう, Kanjō ga bakuhatsu shisō); 135. "Can Understand Why You Want to Rush" (焦る気持ちはよくわかる, Aseru kimochi wa yoku wakaru); 136. "The New Ability" (新しい能力, Atarashī nōryoku); 137. "Preparation" (心構え, Kokoro gamae); 138. "The Battle Has Begun" (戦いは始まった, Tatakai wa hajimatta); 139. "Explosive! Descendant!" (爆！ 臨ッッ！, Bakuhatsu! Nozomu~tsu~tsu!); Chapters in volume 12; 140. "I Won't Resist It Anymore!" (モウ我慢シナイ！, Mō gaman shinai!); 141. "Just An Ordinary Girl" (ただの女の子, Tada no on'nanoko); 142. "Then, I Climbed the Stairs" (そしてぼくは階段を昇った, Soshite boku wa kaidan o nobotta); 143. "The Evil Villain" (とてつもない悪党, Totetsumonai akutō); 144. "Goodbye" (サヨウナラ, Sayōnara); 145. "I Will Slowly...Enjoy..." (じっくりと…味わって…, Jikkuri to… ajiwatte…); 146. "Railgun Chance" (レールガンチャンス, Rērugan Chansu); 147. "It's Coming!!" (来るっ!!, Kurutsu!!); 148. "You End Here" (あなたは ここで終わりよ, Anata wa koko de owari yo); 149. "Follow Yuri Honjo" (ホンジョウユリに従って, Honjou Yuri ni shitagatte); 150. "The Prophet" (預言者, Yogensha)
13–14	July 7, 2017; October 6, 2017	978-4-06-510028-8 (volume 13); 978-4-06-510262-6 (volume 14)	July 28, 2020	978-1-64505-480-1
Chapters in volume 13; 151. "Actually, There Is More Than One" (すばらしい兄妹愛, Subarashī kyōdai ai); 152. "No Time For Talking" (テレグノシス, Teregunoshisu); 153. "When I First Met You" (私が何をしようとも, Watashi ga nani o shiyou tomo); 154. "Let's Roll" (私がアンタを殺しちゃう, Watashi ga anta o koroshi chau); 155. "Mr. Sniper" (把握, Haaku); 156. "A Very Bad Girl" (リーダー, Rīdā); 157. "Welcome" (貴殿と敵対する者より, Kiden to tekitai suru mono yori); 158. "The Justice Execution Blade" (器量, Kiryō); 159. "Restart" (神様になんかなりたくない, Kamisama ni nanka naritakunai); 160. "He Can Be Dead Anytime" (私が神をあきらめた理由, Watashi ga kami o akirameta riyū); 161. "Something Bad Is Going To Happen" (君とはもっと話をしていたかった, Kimi to wa motto hanashi o shite itakatta); 162. "Brother......?" (メジャーな呼称, Mejāna koshō); Chapters in volume 14; 163. "Actually, There Is More Than One" (実は一つではなく, Jitsuha hitotsu de hanaku); 164. "No Time For Talking" (駄弁（だべ）ってる時間はない, Daben (dabe) tteru toki hanai); 165. "When I First Met You" (私と初めて出会った時, Watashi to hajimete dēto toki); 166. "Let's Roll" (戦闘開始, Sentoukaishi); 167. "Mr. Sniper" (ミスター・スナイパー, Misuta sunaipa); 168. "A Very Bad Girl" (とっても悪い子, Tottemo waruiko); 169. "Welcome" (ようこそ, Youkoso); 170. "The Justice Execution Blade" (正義を執行する刃, Seigi o shikkou suru jin); 171. "Restart" (再発動, Saihatsudou); 172. "He Can Be Dead Anytime" (何故まだ生きているのか, Naniyue mada ikitei runoka); 173. "Something Bad Is Going To Happen" (たいへんな ことに なるから, taihen na koto ninarukara); 174. "Brother......?" (お兄ちゃん……？, O nii-chan……？)
15–16	January 9, 2018; April 9, 2018	978-4-06-510726-3 (volume 15); 978-4-06-511240-3 (volume 16)	November 24, 2020	978-1-64505-756-7
Chapters in volume 15; 175. "This Realm Becomes Serious" (この領域が本気を出す, Kono ryōiki ga honki o dasu); 176. "Now I Am" (今のオレ, Ima no ore); 177. "Nemesis Surrogate" (天罰代行, Tenbatsu daikō); 178. "Idiots Who Aimed For The Sun" (太陽を目指したオロカモノ, Taiyō o mezashita orokamono); 179. "Guardian Angel vs ..." (守護天使ＶＳ, Shugo tenshi VS); 180. "Awaken" (目覚めさせる, Mezame saseru); 181. "The Move We Should Make" (オレたちはどう動く, Ore-tachi wa dō ugoku); 182. "I Will Show You!" (教えてアゲルッ！, Oshiete agerutsu!); 183. "This is Awesome" (これはすごい, Kore wa sugoi); 184. "Wind" (風, Kaze); 185. "At Your Disposal" (貴方のお役に, Anata no o-yaku ni); Chapters in volume 16; 186. "What he really wants to do" (本当の狙い, Hontō no nerai); 187. "Remember The Death" (死を記憶せよ, Shi o kioku seyo); 188. "To Put It Simply" (わかりやすく考えると, Wakari yasuku kangaeru to); 189. "The Success Rate" (成功する可能性, Seikō suru kanōsei); 190. "What should i do, Kuon-Chan!" (どうしよう九遠ちゃん, Dō shiyō Kuon-chan); 191. "Honjo-san's Weak Point" (本城さんのダメな部分, Honjō-san no damena bubun); 192. "I'd Like To Advise You" (進言, Shingen); 193. "What You Should Do" (あなたがたの為すべきこと, Anata gata no tame subeki koto); 194. "You Are The Worst of All" (クズの中のクズ, Kuzu no naka no kuzu); 195. "I Feel Like A Fool" (バッカみたい, Bakka mitai); 196. "Memory" (記憶, Kioku)
17–18	July 9, 2018; October 9, 2018	978-4-06-511787-3 (volume 17); 978-4-06-512601-1 (volume 18)	March 30, 2021	978-1-64505-990-5
Chapters in volume 17; 197. "We Can't Play Anymore" (もう遊べなくなる, Mō asobe naku naru); 198. "The Truth Of Mr. Mask" (仮面さんの真実, Kamen-san no shinjitsu); 199. "Where You're Reachable" (手の届く場所まで, Te no todoku basho made); 200. "Evil" (魔, Ma); 201. "I Won't Kill Anymore!" (殺すのヤメルッ！, Korosu no yamerutsu!); 202. "Inexperienced Wave" (未体験の波動, Mi taiken no hadō); 203. "So Dumb" (バカ丸出し, Baka marudashi); 204. "The Last Order" (最後の命令, Saigo no meirei); 205. "Above All Things" (なには ともあれ, Nani wa tomoare); 206. "Thank You, Justice!" (貴方のお役に, Sankyū! Masayoshi!); 207. "Nothing But A Beast That Rebels Against Heaven" (天に反逆するだけのただの獣, Ten ni hangyaku suru dake no tada no kemono); Chapters in volume 18; 208. "Whatever the Condition Is" (どんな状態であろうと, Don'na jōtai dearou to); 209. "The Boundary" (境界, Kyōkai); 210. "The Reason Something Like That" (その程度のこと, Sono teido no koto); 211. "Sleeper Cell" (スリーパー・セル, Surīpā Seru); 212. "A New Problem" (新しい問題, Atarashī mondai); 213. "Behind That Door" (あの扉の向こう, Ano tobira no mukō); 214. "Over-Optimistic" (考えが甘い, Kangae ga amai); 215. "Hey" (なぁ, Nā); 216. "Weak Younger Brother" (弱い弟, Yowai otōto); 217. "Honest People" (素直な人間, Sunaona ningen); 218. "The Code Name, "Tenma"" (コードネーム天魔, Kōdo Nēmu tenma); 219. "Did I Hit Her?!" (やったかッッ！？, Yatta ka~tsu~tsu!?)
19–20	January 9, 2019; April 9, 2019	978-4-06-513870-0 (volume 19); 978-4-06-514871-6 (volume 20)	October 12, 2021	978-1-64827-252-3
Chapters in volume 19; 220. "To Be Honest With You" (本音を言わせてもらうと, Hon'ne o iwa sete morauto); 221. "What Is Going To Happen?" (ドウナルノデスカ？, Dounaruno desuka?); 222. "Emotion Rather Than Reason, Desire Rather Than Moral" (理論よりも感情倫理よりも欲望, Riron yori mo kanjō rinri yori mo yokubō); 223. "Die, You Bastard" (テメェが死ねカス野郎, Teme ga shine Kasu yarō); 224. "Consciousness is Also One of the Different - Dimension World" (意識もひとつの異世界, Ishiki mo hitotsu no isekai); 225. "Someone Worth Killing" (殺してもいい存在, Koroshite mo ī sonzai); 226. "Arrived, Saw, And..." (来た見たそして, Kita mita soshite); 227. "Something I Want To Ask You" (聞いておきたいこと, Kiite okitai koto); 228. "The Tactic" (ヤリ方, Yarikata); 229. "Last Duty" (最後の義務, Saigo no gimu); 230. "We, Guardian Angels" (ボクたち守護天使, Bokutachi shugo tenshi); Chapters in volume 20; 231. "Liar" (嘘つき, Usotsuki); 232. "The Soul Source" (強さの源, Tsuyo-sa no minamoto); 233. "This Is Really Bad" (これは確かにヤバそうだ, Kore wa tashika ni yaba-sōda); 234. "I Am A Professional" (私はプロだ！, Watashi wa Puroda!); 235. "From That Place" (その場所から, Sono basho kara); 236. "Violating So Many Rules" (ルール違反にも程がある, Rūru ihan ni mo hodo ga aru); 237. "Strong And Hefty" (強くたくましく, Tsuyoku takumashiku); 238. "The Status Quo" (現状, Genjō); 239. "Ah..." (あっ, Atsu); 240. "The Feelings of Humans" (人間たちのキモチ, Ningen-tachi no kimochi); 241. "I Can't Stand It" (そんなのは いやだ, Son'na no wa iyada); 242. "The Terminal Phase" (終末段階, Shūmatsu dankai)
21	July 9, 2019	978-4-06-516663-5	October 12, 2021	978-1-64827-252-3
243. "Something Like A Reward" (ご褒美的なモノ, Go hōbi-tekina mono); 244. "The Secret Of The Emotionless Mask" (無表情仮面の秘密, Muhyōjō kamen no himitsu); 245. "The Fact Is..." (事実ッッそれはッッッ, Jijitsu ~tsussoreha ~tsu~tsu~tsu); 246. "Unfair" (不公平, Fukōhei); 247. "New Body" (新しいカラダ, Atarashī karada); 248. "In The End, Others Are Others" (最終的には他者は他者, Saishūtekini wa tasha wa tasha); 249. "It's Amazing!" (凄すぎるんだけどッッッ！, Sugo sugiru ndakedo ~tsu~tsu~tsu!); 250. "It's Not Your Fault" (貴方は悪くない, Anata wa warukunai); 251. "Everybody Experiences It Once" (全員一度は経験, Zen'in ichido wa keiken); 252. "High-Rise Invasion" (天空侵犯, Tenkū shinpan); 253. "Have The Cute Sister All To Myself" (カワイイ妹を独り占め, Kawaī imōto o hitorijime); 254. "The Duality of God and Humans" (神と人間の二重性, Kami to ningen no nijū-sei); 255. "Just A Little" (ちょっとぐらいなら, Chotto gurainara); 256. "It's Easier To Give Up Quickly" (すぐにあきらめたほうが楽, Sugu ni akirameta hō ga raku); 257. "The Sister I Am Proud Of" (自慢の妹, Jiman no imōto)

=== High-Rise Invasion Arrive ===
No.	Release date	ISBN
1	November 8, 2019	978-4-06-517306-0
2	February 7, 2020	978-4-06-518169-0
3	May 8, 2020	978-4-06-518846-0
4	September 9, 2020	978-4-06-520328-6
5	November 9, 2020	978-4-06-521265-3
6	February 9, 2021	978-4-06-522354-3
7	June 9, 2021	978-4-06-523123-4
