= Love Lies =

Love Lies may refer to:

== Film ==
- Love Lies (1932 film), a British film based on Stanley Lupino's 1929 musical of the same name
- Love Lies (1989 film), a Mexican film directed by Arturo Ripstein
- Love, Lies (2016 film), a South Korean film directed by Park Heung-sik
- Love Lies (2024 film), a Hong Kong film directed by Ho Miu Ki

== Music ==
- Love Lies (Cristy Lane album), 1978
- Love Lies (Janie Fricke album), 1983
- "Love Lies" (song), by Normani and Khalid from the Love, Simon soundtrack, 2018
- "Love Lies", a song by Bon Jovi from Bon Jovi, 1984
- "Love Lies", a song by Diana Ross from Silk Electric, 1982

== See also ==
- Love and Lies (disambiguation)
- Three: Love, Lies, Betrayal, a 2009 Indian film
