= Psychometrer Eiji =

Japanese manga series

- First tankōbon volume cover

サイコメトラーEIJI (Saikometorā Eiji)
- Manga
- Written by: Yuma Ando
- Illustrated by: Masashi Asaki
- Published by: Kodansha
- Magazine: Weekly Shōnen Magazine
- Original run: April 17, 1996 – September 27, 2000
- Volumes: 25
- Manga

Psychometrer
- Written by: Yuma Ando
- Illustrated by: Masashi Asaki
- Published by: Kodansha
- Magazine: Weekly Young Magazine
- Original run: April 25, 2011 – August 18, 2014
- Volumes: 15
- Manga

Debusen
- Written by: Yuma Ando
- Illustrated by: Masashi Asaki
- Published by: DeNA (digital); Kodansha (print)
- Magazine: Manga Box; Weekly Young Magazine
- Original run: March 3, 2014 – August 29, 2016
- Volumes: 9

Psychometrer Eiji (Japanese: サイコメトラーEIJI, Hepburn: Saikometorā Eiji) is a Japanese manga series written by Yuma Ando and illustrated by Masashi Asaki. It was serialized by Kodansha in Weekly Shōnen Magazine from 1996 to 2000, with its chapters collected in 25 tankōbon volumes. A sequel, titled Psychometrer, was serialized in Weekly Young Magazine from 2011 to 2014.

== Summary ==
Asuma Eiji is a normal high school student, with a reputation for being violent and involved in gangs. But he has the psychometry ability, which is discovered by Shima Ryoko, a police investigator when his little sister Emi gets involved in a serial murder case. And so, Shima uses her charm to get the boy to help her, and Eiji obliges, getting more and more involved in the murders, his powers proving to be quite powerful.

== Characters ==
Eiji Asuma (明日真映児, Asuma Eiji)
A troublemaker, loud and outspoken high school student with the power of psychometry, which is hidden from all except his sister Emi, his childhood friend Yusuke, policewoman Shima and criminal mastermind Sawaki. He is well known as a strong and unbeatable fighter, and often gets into fights.
Emi Asuma (明日真恵美, Asuma Emi)
Eiji's younger sister, though not biologically. She appears to have feelings for her brother and is the object of affection of Yusuke and object of lust of a neighborhood pervert. She gets involved in the police cases her brothers helps in a few times along the series.
Ryoko Shima (志摩亮子, Shima Ryoko)
A seductive and beautiful, young policewoman. An elite "Career" detective on fast track. She is single, independent and is always wearing sexy underwear and revealing clothes. She believes in Eiji's powers and that they can make a difference in the cases she is involved in, but the rest of the police work is done in great part by her, a very smart and quick woman. It is suggested throughout the series that she and Eiji have developed feelings for each other.
Yuusuke Kasai (葛西 裕介, Kasai Yuusuke)
Having known and understood Eiji's psychometry for years, he became Eiji's the best friend whom Eiji trusts. For being a psychologist, helps Eiji and Ryoko's investigation. With Eiji, made a band-Natsumikan then be in charge of composing and playing the keyboard. Intelligent and marks the highest scores in school. Cute boy with looking-young attracts girls, but he is into Emi. Later, in 'Kunimitsu's politics', he enters the Tokyo University at once, so works as Emi's tutor in 'Psychometrer'. In the 2nd season of live action version, he is a student of Tokyo University. Special episode makes him a pre-diplomat.
Toru Egawa (江川 透流, Egawa Toru)
Eiji's friend and classmate, he is the leader of a large gang and is well known for his fighting ability. However, he has a strong sense of justice and will defend what is right, even if it means defying his friends. His mother is the mistress of an unnamed politician and is a strong-willed woman who works as the head chef at a restaurant.
Akira Sawaki (沢木 晃, Sawaki Akira)
A classmate of Shima's from college. It is revealed that he is a criminal genius, stated to have an IQ of over 200, and has masterminded many crimes. Despite this, he has offered hints to Shima about cases on multiple occasions, claiming he views her as a potential rival and wishes to help her "cultivate" her abilities until they can truly face each other one last time. However, he has attempted to remove Eiji so she will not be able to depend on his psychometry anymore, having tried to murder him and also use psychological warfare. He has hinted that his interest in Shima may be somewhat romantic, though in his own, twisted way.
Shoukichi Tamiya (田宮 章吉, Tamiya Shoukichi)
Eiji's friend and too outspoken person. Born with silver spoon, but almost dumped out from home due to his bad acts.

== Media ==
=== Manga ===
Psychometrer Eiji, written by Shin Kibayashi (as Yuma Ando), illustrated by Masashi Asaki, was serialized in Kodansha's Weekly Shōnen Magazine from April 17, 1996, to September 27, 2000. The manga was compiled into 25 tankōbon volumes, which were published by Kodansha between July 17, 1996, and October 17, 2000. It was republished from June 12 to November 12, 2003, into 12 volumes. It has been licensed in other countries, such as in Singapore by Chuang Yi, in Taiwan by Tong Li Publishing, and in France by Kana.

Through Yuma Ando's Twitter, it was announced in November 2010 that the series would return. The sequel, titled Psychometrer, started in Kodansha's Weekly Young Magazine on April 25, 2011. The series entered on an indefinite hiatus on August 18, 2014. Its first tankōbon was released on October 6, 2011, while the latest, the 15th, was released on December 5, 2014. Tong Li has been publishing it in Taiwan.

==== Debusen ====
On March 3, 2014, a comedic spin-off series, Debusen (でぶせん; lit. 'Fat Chaser'), started to be serialized in Manga Box. After concluding its serialization in Manga Box, Debusen started to be released in Young Magazine on October 6, 2014, and ended on August 29, 2016. The first tankōbon volume of Debusen was published on December 5, 2014, and the ninth and last one was published on September 6, 2016. Debusen revolves around Mitsuru Fukushima, who plans to commit suicide after falling into debt because of cosplay practice. However, when he finds the dead body of a female teacher named Mitsuko Fukushima, who looks just like him, he decides to live her life helping to reform delinquent students.

A Hulu-exclusive television drama starring Kanro Morita was ordered by K-Factory and HJ Holdings. The six-episode series is directed by Yoichi Matsunaga, written by Kazuhiko Ban, and produced by Hisashi Tsugiya. It started on August 20, 2016, and ended on October 1, 2016.

=== Other merchandise ===
It was adapted into a Japanese television drama series that was aired for ten episodes Nippon Television from January 11, and March 15, 1997. In 1999, a second season was broadcast to an average television viewership rating of 15.4%, a decline from the 17.1% of the first season. They were followed by a special broadcast on September 24, 2000. Masahiro Matsuoka performed the main role in all of the live-action adaptations.

A PlayStation game was released on February 18, 1999, by Kodansha.

== Reception ==
The series has been popular and enjoyed good number of sales. The 25 volumes of Psychometrer Eiji have sold over 12 million copies in Japan as of November 2007. The first two volumes of Psychometrer were on the Oricon chart of 30 best-selling manga for two weeks, while several others remained on the chart for a week. (Note: See the attached sources for volume 3, volume 4, volume 6, volume 7, volume 8, volume 11, volume 12, volume 13, and volume 14.) When a crime involving a man hidden in a drainage sewer to look at women's underwear, it led to several comparison on Twitter to a similar case that happened in the manga.
