= Rieko Miura =

Japanese actress and singer

- 三浦 理恵子
- Born: 1 September 1973 (age 52); Nakano, Tokyo, Japan
- Occupations: Actress; voice actress; singer
- Years active: 1989–1994; 1995–present
- Agent: Production Ogi
- Spouse: Diamond Yukai (m. 1997; div. 2001)
- Musical career
- Genres: Japanese pop
- Label: Pony Canyon

Rieko Miura (三浦 理恵子, Miura Rieko; pronounced [mʲiɯ̟ᵝɾa̠ ɾʲie̞ko̞]; born 1 September 1973) is a Japanese actress, voice actress, singer and former member of the band CoCo. She was born in Nakano, Tokyo. Her solo debut was on 14 September 1991.

== Filmography ==
=== Film ===
- Kyō no Kira-kun (2017), Kanon Okamura
- Love and Lies (2017), Aoi's mother

=== Television drama ===
- The Kindaichi Case Files (1995–96), Tomoyo Takashima
- Toshiie and Matsu (2002), Kyōgoku Tatsuko
- Tokumei Kakarichō Tadano Hitoshi (2003), Mayuko Shinmizu
- The Great White Tower (2004), Hanako Noda
- He Who Can't Marry (2006), Keiko Nakagawa

=== Television animation ===
- Kochikame (1998–2004), Komachi Ono
- Read or Die (OVA) (2001), Yomiko Readman
- R.O.D the TV (2003–2004), Yomiko Readman

== Discography ==
=== Singles ===
- 14 February 1991: Namida no Tsubomi tachi. Oricon number 10.
- 3 July 1991: Suiheisen de Tsukamaete. Oricon number 6.
- 7 November 1991: Nichiyo wa Dameyo. Oricon number 13.
- 26 February 1992: Joke ni mo Naranai Koi. Oricon number 10.
- 18 September 1992: Kamisama kara morratta Chance. Oricon number 13.
- 19 March 1993: Tenshi no Iru Nagisa. Oricon number 25.
- 1 December 1993: Dakishimete Destiny. Oricon number 38.
- 19 August 1994: Rakuen no Toriko. Oricon number 38.
- 10 June 1995: Girls, be Ambitious! Oricon number 48.
- 10 February 1996: Shiawase-na hibi
- 11 December 1996: French Kiss
- 10 August 1997: Arigato

=== Albums ===
- 15 December 1991: Belong to You [PCCA-00338] (mini album – 6 songs). Oricon number 24.
- 25 March 1996: Kiss [AMCM-4243]

Compilation albums

- Miura Rieko Best (Japanese: 三浦理恵子ベスト) (2002)
- Miura Rieko Singles Complete (Japanese: 三浦理恵子 SINGLESコンプリート) (2007)

=== Video ===
- 21 March 1992: Belong to You (Rieko Miura First Concert)
- 19 June 1992: Yume de Aitai – Sweet Dreams – Video Clips 1
- 20 November 1992: Rieko's Vacation – Rieko Miura Second Concert
- 2 June 1993: Rendez-vous RIEKO in New Caledonia & Vanuatu
- 25 April 1996: Live at On Air East

== Picture books ==
- 2 October 1991: Virgo (kindai eigashokan)
- 4 February 1993: Relish (Wani Books)
- 30 November 1996: atashi (kindai eigashokan)
- Jul 2002: Hugs
- Sep 2004:
