= Survival (manga) =

Japanese manga series

- First tankōbon volume cover published by Leed Publishing

サバイバル
- Genre: Adventure; Survival; Suspense
- Manga
- Written by: Takao Saito
- Published by: Shogakukan; Leed Publishing (print)
- English publisher: NA: JManga (digital)
- Imprint: Shōnen Sunday Comics
- Magazine: Weekly Shōnen Sunday
- Original run: September 19, 1976 – December 21, 1980
- Volumes: 22
- Manga

Survival: Shōnen S no Kiroku
- Written by: Takao Saito
- Illustrated by: Akira Miyagawa
- Published by: Leed Publishing
- English publisher: Shōnen Magazine Comics
- Magazine: Manga Box
- Original run: April 30, 2015 – November 28, 2016
- Volumes: 5

Survival (Japanese: サバイバル) is a Japanese manga series written and illustrated by Takao Saito. It was serialized in Shogakukan's shōnen manga magazine Weekly Shōnen Sunday from September 1976 to December 1980, with its chapters collected in 22 tankōbon volumes. A Remake titled Survival: Shōnen S no Kiroku (Note: Japanese: サバイバル～少年Sの記録～, Hepburn: 'Survival: S Boy's Records'), illustrated by Akira Miyagawa serialized in DeNA's manga app Manga Box from May 2015 to November 2016.

== Publication ==
Written and illustrated by Takao Saito, Survival was serialized in Shogakukan's shōnen manga magazine Weekly Shōnen Sunday from September 19, 1976, to December 21, 1980. Shogakukan collected its chapters in twenty-two tankōbon volumes, published from October 15, 1977, to March 15, 1981.

Leed Publishing published the series two times, first in six wide-ban volumes from September 6, 1994, to July 8, 1995, a side story titled Survival: Another Story was also published on July 23, 1995. The second time the company republished the series in ten bunkoban volumes from June 2001 to October 2001.

The side story, Survival: Another Story was licensed for an English release digitally by JManga. In France, Survival had been licensed by Editions Milan.

A Remake of Ishinomori's manga titled Survival: Shōnen S no Kiroku illustrated by Akira Miyagawa began serialization in DeNA's manga app Manga Box on April 30, 2015. The first series finished serialization on November 21, 2018. Leed Publishing collected its chapters in five volumes, released from January 13, 2016, to February 27, 2019.

In France, the manga is licensed by Vega-Dupuis.

=== Remake ===
No.	Release date	ISBN
1	January 13, 2016	978-4-84-584868-3
2	August 27, 2016	978-4-84-584869-0
3	June 27, 2017	978-4-84-584870-6
4	February 27, 2018	978-4-84-585282-6
5	February 27, 2019	978-4-84-585432-5
