= Spoof on Titan =

Japanese manga series

- First tankōbon volume cover

寸劇の巨人 (Sungeki no Kyojin)
- Genre: Parody
- Manga
- Written by: Hounori
- Published by: Kodansha
- English publisher: US: Kodansha USA
- Imprint: Shonen Magazine Comics
- Magazine: Manga Box
- Original run: December 4, 2013 – December 31, 2014
- Volumes: 2

Spoof on Titan (Japanese: 寸劇の巨人, Hepburn: Sungeki no Kyojin; lit. "Short Skits Titan") is a Japanese 4-panel manga written and illustrated by Hounori. The series is a parody-spinoff of Hajime Isayama's popular Attack on Titan manga. It was launched in both Japanese and English on Kodansha and DeNA's manga app Manga Box on December 4, 2013, and ran until December 31, 2014.

Kodansha USA announced its license to the series at New York Comic Con on October 10, 2015 and published it in English in 2016.

== Volumes ==
No.	Original release date	Original ISBN	English release date	English ISBN
1	August 8, 2014	978-4-06-395152-3	September 13, 2016	978-1-63236-408-1
2	April 9, 2015	978-4-06-395360-2	December 13, 2016	978-1-63236-409-8
