= Until Your Bones Rot =

Japanese manga series

- First tankōbon volume cover

骨が腐るまで (Hone ga Kusaru Made)
- Genre: Horror, thriller
- Manga
- Written by: Yae Utsumi
- Published by: Kodansha
- English publisher: NA: Kodansha USA
- Magazine: Manga Box
- Original run: April 30, 2016 – April 2018
- Volumes: 7

Until Your Bones Rot (Japanese: 骨が腐るまで, Hepburn: Hone ga Kusaru Made) is a Japanese manga series written and illustrated by Yae Utsumi. It was serialized in Kodansha's Manga Box from April 2016 to April 2018 and published in seven volumes.

== Publication ==
Written and illustrated by Yae Utsumi, the series began serialization on the Manga Box manga website on April 30, 2016. The series completed its serialization in April 2018. Kodansha collected the series' individual chapters into seven tankōbon volumes.

In October 2017, Kodansha USA announced that they licensed the series for English publication.

=== Volume list ===
No.	Original release date	Original ISBN	English release date	English ISBN
1	October 7, 2016	978-4-06-395756-3	October 17, 2017	978-1-68-233947-3
2	January 6, 2017	978-4-06-395838-6	November 21, 2017	978-1-68-233987-9
3	April 7, 2017	978-4-06-395911-6	December 19, 2017	978-1-64-212026-4
4	July 7, 2017	978-4-06-510032-5	January 30, 2018	978-1-64-212027-1
5	October 6, 2017	978-4-06-510234-3	March 27, 2018	978-1-64-212170-4
6	January 9, 2018	978-4-06-510720-1	April 24, 2018	978-1-64-212208-4
7	April 9, 2018	978-4-06-511271-7	July 24, 2018	978-1-64-212325-8

== Reception ==
Ashitaka from Manga Sanctuary felt that although the story was nothing new, it was still enjoyable, though they also criticized the story for lacking action and suspense at times. Faustine Lillaz from Planete BD felt that it had some exaggerated reactions and disjointed narration, though she offered praise for the artwork.
