= Holiday Love =

Japanese manga series

- Cover of the first manga volume.

ホリデイラブ～夫婦間恋愛～ (Horidei Rabu: Fūfukan Ren'ai)
- Manga
- Written by: Yukari Koyama
- Illustrated by: Eliza Kusakabe
- Published by: Kodansha
- Imprint: Kodansha Comics Kiss
- Magazine: Manga Box
- Original run: September 25, 2014 – September 29, 2019
- Volumes: 8
- Television drama
- Directed by: Ayato Matsuda
- Written by: Chiho Watanabe
- Music by: Masaru Yokoyama
- Original network: TV Asahi
- Original run: January 26, 2018 – March 16, 2018
- Episodes: 8
- Original net animation
- Studio: Production I.G
- Released: August 3, 2018
- Episodes: 20

Holiday Love (ホリデイラブ～夫婦間恋愛～, Horidei Rabu: Fūfukan Ren'ai) is a Japanese manga series written by Yukari Koyama and illustrated by Eliza Kusakabe. It was serialized online in DeNA's Manga Box app in multiple languages since September 2014 and published in print by Kodansha in five volumes. An 8-episode live-action drama adaptation aired on TV Asahi from January 26 to March 16, 2018, and a 20-episode original net animation adaptation premiered on Production I.G's Anime Beans app on August 3, 2018.
