= Love and Lies (manga) =

Japanese manga and anime series

- The cover of the first volume featuring Misaki Takasaki

恋と嘘 (Koi to Uso)
- Genre: Romance
- Manga
- Written by: Musawo
- Published by: Kodansha
- English publisher: NA: Kodansha USA
- Imprint: Shōnen Magazine Comics
- Magazine: Manga Box
- Original run: August 2014 – January 2022
- Volumes: 12 (2 versions of Vol 12)
- Anime television series
- Directed by: Seiki Takuno
- Written by: Natsuko Takahashi
- Music by: Masaru Yokoyama; Nobuaki Nobusawa
- Studio: Liden Films
- Licensed by: NA: Sentai Filmworks; UK: MVM Films; SA/SEA: Muse Communication
- Original network: Tokyo MX, Sun TV, KBS, BS11, tvk, AT-X
- English network: SEA: Animax Asia
- Original run: July 4, 2017 – September 19, 2017
- Episodes: 12 + OVA
- Live-action film
- Love and Lies (2017)

Love and Lies (Japanese: 恋と嘘, Hepburn: Koi to Uso) is a Japanese manga by Musawo (also known as Musawo Tsumugi (紬木 ムサヲ, Tsumugi Musawo)). The series follows a teenage boy who confesses to his long-time crush, despite the fact that he has been assigned a fiancée by the government in an alternate version of modern Japan. It is published by Kodansha, and was serialized in DeNA's Manga Box app in multiple languages from August 2014 to January 2022. An anime television series adaptation by Liden Films aired from July to September 2017. A live-action film adaptation was released in October 2017.

== Plot ==
In the near future, children who have turned 16 years old are assigned by the government to a partner based on compatibility calculation to increase the country's birth rate. Those who do not marry their assigned partner suffer severe penalties. Yukari Nejima finally confesses his love to schoolmate and long-time crush Misaki Takasaki and discovers she has liked him back. However, when he turns 16, he is assigned another girl, Ririna Sanada. Ririna is not that thrilled about being assigned, and is very willing to let Yukari freely relate with Misaki so she can learn what being in love is really like. The story follows their adventures of the teens as they try to relate with one another while keeping up appearances with the government.

== Characters ==
Yukari Nejima (根島 由佳吏, Nejima Yukari)
Voiced by: Ryōta Ōsaka
The main protagonist of the series, Yukari has been in love with his classmate Misaki Takasaki since Grade 5 of elementary school. Before his 16th birthday, he confessed his feelings to Misaki Takasaki, which apparently turned out to be mutual.^{Ch. 1-2} Yuakri enjoys studying Kofun ancient burial mounds.^{Ch. 2}
Misaki Takasaki (高崎 美咲, Takasaki Misaki)
Voiced by: Kana Hanazawa
The first heroine of the series, Misaki is Yukari's first love with is also in love with him.^{Ch. 1-2} She is beautiful and popular among her schoolmates. She first noticed Yukari in Grade 5 of elementary school when he broke his eraser into two and gave her one half after seeing that she did not have an eraser since first period. She developed feelings of love for him and his many quirks.^{Ch. 11} She thinks Ririna is a bit naive when it comes to encouraging her and Yukari to continue relating with each other as a couple.
Ririna Sanada (真田 莉々奈, Sanada Ririna; also "Lilina Sanada")
Voiced by: Yui Makino
The second heroine of the series. Ririna is Yukari's arranged partner. She is a beautiful girl with rose blonde hair and big eyes where she resembles a doll. She is aware of Yukari's feelings towards Misaki and agrees to help him out as she wishes to learn what love is like too,^{Ch. 6-7} and perks up whenever there is the topic of love among Yukari and his friends.^{Ch. 28} When she was younger she was often sick, and when she conversed with girls she was often candid on her thoughts, so she was unable to make friends. Her classmates are envious of her looks and grades, calling her stuck up.^{Ch. 8-9}
Yūsuke Nisaka (仁坂 悠介, Nisaka Yūsuke)
Voiced by: Shinnosuke Tachibana
Yukari's friend who is surrounded in mystery. He becomes aware of the relationship between Yukari and the girls.^{Ch. 15} He is very popular with the girls, that they had one of them date him for six months.^{Ch. 28} Unlike Yukari, he does not have cooking or cleaning skills.^{Ch. 29}
Hajime Yajima (矢嶋 基, Yajima Hajime)
Voiced by: Kishō Taniyama
A member of the Ministry of Health, Labor, and Welfare, assigned to Yukari and Ririna's marriage case. He has grey hair in the anime.
Kagetsu Ichijō (一条 花月, Ichijō Kagetsu)
Voiced by: Tomoyo Kurosawa
A member of the Ministry of Health, Labor, and Welfare, assigned to Yukari and Ririna's marriage case. She has short red hair in the anime and works with Yajima.
Shū Igarashi (五十嵐 柊, Igarashi Shū)
Voiced by: Eri Kitamura
Misaki's best friend in middle school who seems to know the reason behind Yukari's sudden partner change.

== Media ==
=== Manga ===
Love and Lies was serialized on DeNA's Manga Box app from August 2014 to January 2022. Twelve volumes were released by Kodansha. The French version, licensed by Pika Shonen, was first released on November 2, 2016 and the fifth volume was released on June 28, 2017. The English version has been licensed by Kodansha USA, with the first volume being released on August 22, 2017. An official fanbook was released on July 7, 2017, in Japan.

==== Volumes ====
No.	Original release date	Original ISBN	English release date	English ISBN
1	January 9, 2015	978-4-06-395284-1	August 22, 2017	978-1-63-236499-9
1. "First Love" (初恋, Hatsukoi); 2. "A Little Lie" (小さな嘘, Chiisana Uso); 3. "Talk About Love" (恋の話, Koi no Hanashi); 4. "The Kiss of a Lie" (嘘の口づけ, Uso no Kuchizuke); 4.5. "A Friend's Love" (友達の恋, Tomodachi no Koi)
2	June 9, 2015	978-4-06-395416-6	October 24, 2017	978-1-63-236500-2
5. "A Lie to a Friend" (友達への嘘, Tomodachi e no Uso); 6. "The Science of Love" (恋の科学, Koi no Kagaku); 7. "Lying Curry" (嘘のカレー, Uso no Karē); 8. "A Love Worth Risking Life" (命がけの恋, Inochigake no Koi); 9. "Can't Lie to Your Heart" (心に嘘はつけない, Kokoro ni Uso wa Tsukenai)
3	November 9, 2015	978-4-06-395546-0	December 26, 2017	978-1-63-236501-9
10. "Love's Ripples" (恋の波紋, Koi no Hamon); 10.5. "Lies to Yourself" (自分への嘘, Jibun e no Uso); 11. "Where Love Gathers" (恋の集まる場所, Koi no Atsumaru Basho); 12. "Sorting the Lies" (嘘の選別, Uso no Senbetsu); 13. "The Cage that Forces Love" (恋を強いる檻, Koi o Shiiru Ori); 14. "Wordless Lies" (無言の嘘, Mugon no Uso"); Bonus. "Treasure" (たからもの, Takara Mono)
4	May 9, 2016	978-4-06-395664-1	February 13, 2018	978-1-63-236560-6
15. "A Little Talk of Old Love" (ちょっとだけ昔の恋の話, Chotto dake Mukashi no Koi no Hanashi); Bonus Chapter. "Misaki Takasaki, Age 14" (高崎美咲14歳, Misaki Takasaki 14-sai); 16. "Feelings Without Lies" (嘘のない想い, Uso no Nai Omoi); 17. "The Philosophy of Love" (恋の哲学, Koi no Tetsugaku); 18. "With Sparkles Like Lies" (嘘みたいな煌めきで, Uso Mitaina Kirameki de)
5	November 9, 2016	978-4-06-395792-1 (regular ed.); 978-4-06-362346-8 (special ed.)	April 10, 2018	978-1-63-236561-3
19. "Love that Offers Everything" (すべてを捧げる恋, Subete o Sasageru Koi); 20. "Just Lie to Me" (嘘でもいいから, Uso demo Ii kara); 21. "Witness to Love" (恋の目撃者, Koi no Mokugeki-sha); 22. "The Distance to a Lie" (嘘の距離感, Uso no Kyori-kan)
6	June 9, 2017	978-4-06-395952-9 (regular ed.); 978-4-06-510065-3 (special ed.)	June 19, 2018	978-1-63-236625-2
23. "The One Beloved" (恋した相手は, Koi shita Aite wa); 24. "Lies that Bind" (真実に繋がる嘘, Shinjitsu ni Tsunagaru Uso); 25. "Chains of Love" (恋の鎖, Koi no Kusari); 26. "Feelings without Lies" (嘘のない想いを, Uso no Nai Omoi o)
7	April 9, 2018	978-4-06-510382-1 (regular ed.); 978-4-06-511611-1 (special ed.)	August 21, 2018	978-1-63-236626-9
27. "Love Upon a Star" (星に恋して, Hoshi ni Koishite); 28. "A Lie Confessed" (予告された嘘, Yokokusareta Uso); 29. "Love's Responsibility" (恋心の責任, Koigokoro no Sekinin); 29.5. "The Lie of a Friend" (友達の嘘, Tomodachi no Uso)
8	November 16, 2018	978-4-06-513246-3 (regular ed.); 978-4-06-397037-1 (limited ed.)	October 22, 2019	978-1-63-236675-7
30. "A Normal Sort of Love" (普通の恋, Futsū no Koi); 31. "The Limit of a Lie" (嘘の限界, Uso no Genkai); Bonus. "The Girl Who Waits For Love" (恋を待つ少女, Koi o Matsu Shōjo)
9	July 9, 2019	978-4-06-515497-7 (regular ed.); 978-4-06-517035-9 (special ed.)	October 27, 2020	978-1-6323-6676-4
32. "The Day the Lies Began" (嘘が始まった日, Uso ga Hajimatta Hi); 33. "Just a Boy in Love" (恋するただの男の子, Koisuru Tada no Otokonoko)
10	March 9, 2020	978-4-06-518719-7 (regular ed.); 978-4-06-518880-4 (special ed.)	June 22, 2021	978-1-64-651057-3
34. "A Special and Ordinary Love" (特別で普通な恋, Tokubetsude Futsuna Koi); 35. "Lies Mixed with Truth" (本気混じりの嘘, Honki-majiri no Uso); 36. "Intruder of Love" (恋の介入者, Koi no Kainyu-sha); 37. "The End of the Respite of Lies" (嘘休み明け, Uso Yasumi-ake); 38. "That Love of the Past" (かつての恋に, Katsute no Koi ni); 38.5. "Letting Go of a Lie" (嘘を手放して, Uso o Tebanashite)
11	December 9, 2020	978-4-06-521669-9 (regular ed.); 978-4-06-521670-5 (special ed.)	February 15, 2022	978-1-64-651224-9
39. Koi no Yurameki (恋のゆらめき); 40. Uso ni Natta Omoi (嘘になった想い); 41. Koi o Tsutaeta Basho de (恋を伝えた場所で); 42. Uso Mitai ni Kokoro wa (嘘みたいに心は); 43. Koi o Tadoru (恋を辿る); 44. Zettai Junshu no Uso (絶対遵守の嘘)
12	January 7, 2022	978-4-06-526395-2 (Lilina ending); 978-4-06-526394-5 (Misaki ending)	October 25, 2022	978-1-64-651313-0 (Lilina ending); 978-1-64-651581-3 (Misaki ending)

=== Anime ===
An anime adaptation by Liden Films and directed by Seiki Takuno aired from July 4 (Note: The premiere is listed as July 3 at 24:00, which is actually July 4.) to September 19, 2017. The four-member rock band Frederic performed the opening theme song titled "Kanashii Ureshii" (かなしいうれしい; lit. 'Sad and Happy') while trio Roy performed the ending theme song titled "Can't You Say?". Sentai Filmworks have licensed the series and streamed the series on Anime Strike and on HiDive outside the United States. MVM Films has licensed the series in the UK.

An original animation DVD was announced on the release of the seventh volume of the manga, with the DVD being bundled with the eighth volume of the manga on November 9, 2018. The release will include two episodes.

No.	Title (Note: All English titles are taken from Anime Strike.)	Original air date
1	"First Love"; Transliteration: "Hatsukoi" (Japanese: 初恋)	July 4, 2017
In a world where Japanese government ministry decides on an arranged marriage system that the teenage pairs with life partners on the boy's sixteenth birthday, Yukari Nejima, has a secret feeling for Misaki Takasaki. At night of his sixteenth birthday, he finally consolidates his determination and conveys his long-standing feelings, but shortly thereafter, a government notice arrives at him.
2	"A Small Lie"; Transliteration: "Chīsana Uso" (Japanese: 小さな嘘)	July 11, 2017
Yukari, who is the first person to meet Ririna Sanada, the other party of the government notice. Ririna gets angry and goes out of her room when Misaki is unforgettable and vague. Ririna wants Yukari, who actually has someone he likes, to tell about his story.
3	"Overlooked Love"; Transliteration: "Miotosareta Koi" (Japanese: 見落とされた恋)	July 18, 2017
Yukari is told by Ririna to kiss Misaki once a day. He is suddenly confused, but when he visits to Ririna's house, Misaki is there. Furthermore, Yukari and Misaki are confused when Ririna tells Misaki to kiss in Ririna's house.
4	"The Science of Love"; Transliteration: "Koi no Kagaku" (Japanese: 恋の科学)	July 25, 2017
As an interview survey, Hajime Yajima and Kagetsu Ichijō of the Ministry of Health, Labor and Welfare visit Yukari's house. On his way home, he is asked for the location of Misaki's. Yukari, who finally realizes that Misaki has received a government notice, cannot hide his upset feelings. Ririna asks him to be firm.
5	"Risky Love"; Transliteration: "Inochigake no Koi" (Japanese: 命がけの恋)	August 1, 2017
Misaki decides to go camping with the Nejima and Sanada families. Yukari, who hears from Ririna that she invites Misaki, asks Yūsuke to come with her. Yukari, who suspects that Yūsuke's favorite person is Misaki, feels a little awkward about her and she greets the day.
6	"A Prison to Compel Love"; Transliteration: "Koi o Shiiru Ori" (Japanese: 恋を強いる檻)	August 8, 2017
Yukari and Ririna are invited to a seminar by the Ministry of Health, Labor and Welfare. As a training, he will spend one night in a private room with only two people, but he can not hide the tension between each other. Yukari is upset when Hajime of the Ministry of Health, Labor and Welfare hears that "the room is monitored".
7	"A Silent Lie"; Transliteration: "Mugon no Uso" (Japanese: 無言の嘘)	August 15, 2017
Yukari has been separated from Ririna since one night at the Ministry of Health, Labor and Welfare. As the summer vacation is about to end awkwardly, the practice of the gender reversal drama "Romeo and Juliet" begins at the school festival at the Yukari's class.
8	"Feelings Without Lies"; Transliteration: "Uso no Nai Omoi" (Japanese: 嘘のない想い)	August 22, 2017
When Yukari is trying to persuade Yūsuke – who is negative-thinking – to practice the play at the school festival, Yūsuke's father, the knight, appears. They will go out for a meal to make up. On the way back, Yukari tells Yūsuke about his feelings for his school festival.
9	"So Bright It Doesn't Seem Real"; Transliteration: "Uso Mitaina Kirameki de" (Japanese: 嘘みたいな煌めきで)	August 29, 2017
On the day of the school festival, Yukari is enthusiastic while being admired by Misaki's Romeo appearance. On the other hand, Ririna, who has been avoiding Yukari since the seminar, visits the school festival. The curtain of Romeo and Juliet finally comes up without being able to talk to each other while caring about each other.
10	"A Love to Give Everything For"; Transliteration: "Subete o Sasageru Koi" (Japanese: すべてを捧げる恋)	September 5, 2017
Yukari is suddenly asked by Shū Igarashi about what happened to the government notice with Misaki. When he is confused as to why he knows what only two people should know, Ririna, who happens to pass by, hears the story.
11	"I Don't Care if It's a Lie"; Transliteration: "Usodemoīkara" (Japanese: 嘘でもいいから)	September 12, 2017
Misaki, Ririna, Yukari and Yūsuke head to the wedding of Yūsuke's older brother. During his wedding, Misaki asks Yukari to call her for her wedding, with Yukari and Ririna are confused. A few days later, she goes on a hot spring trip with the Nejima and Sanada families, where Ririna tells Yukari about her determination.
12	"Love and Lies"; Transliteration: "Koi to Uso" (Japanese: 恋と嘘)	September 19, 2017
Ririna tells Yukari that she should choose Misaki. She proposes to lie that she hates each other for a while in order to lift the government notice. Yukari, who is confused by her sudden proposal, cannot find a word to return.
OVA	"Love of a Lifetime/Feelings of Love"; Transliteration: "Isshō no Koi/Koi no Kimochi" (Japanese: 一生の恋/恋の気持ち)	November 9, 2018
Yukari, Misaki, Ririna and Yūsuke visit the Sanada family on summer holiday. On the night, Ririna's grandmother tells Ririna and Misaki about her arranged marriage. On another day, Yukari invites Misaki, Ririna and Yūsuke to his house for Halloween, but Yukari's younger sister wants to learn what being in love is really like.

=== Live-action film ===
A live-action film adaptation premiered in October 2017. Instead of a love triangle between one boy and two girls, it has one girl and two boys. The film stars Aoi Morikawa as Aoi Nisaka, the lead heroine; Takumi Kitamura as Yūto Shiba, Aoi's childhood friend; and Kanta Satō as Sōsuke Takachino, Aoi's arranged partner. The film was directed by Takeshi Furusawa and the screenplay done by Erika Yoshida.

== Reception ==
The manga's compiled book volumes have frequently ranked on Oricon's weekly top 50 comic charts. Volume 2 reached number 16, Volume 3 reached number 6, Volume 4 reached number 5, and Volume 5 reached number 15. One month after the manga's launch in 2014, Manga Box had reported Love and Lies as their most popular work with 3.5 million viewers, a month after the manga's launch in August 2014.

The series ranked third in the first Next Manga Award in the web manga category.

== See also ==
- Lilim Holic, another manga series by the same author

== Notes ==
=== Abbreviations ===
- "Ch." is shortened form for "chapter"
- "Ep." is shortened form for "episode"
