= Manga Box =

Japanese manga service

Manga Box (Japanese: マンガボックス, Hepburn: Manga Bokkusu) is a manga magazine mobile app developed by DeNA. Launched on December 4, 2013, it is available as a free app for iOS and Android devices, as well as on the web. The app features manga from publishers such as Kodansha, Shogakukan, among others. Manga artist Shin Kibayashi serves as the editor-in-chief and contributes to several titles under various pseudonyms. In addition to the original manga series run on Manga Box, several of the titles on the app are based on existing works, including Ghost in the Shell, Kindaichi Case Files, Attack on Titan, The Knight in the Area, Space Dandy, Fatal Frame, and Ultraman.

== Features ==
The app is available in Japanese, English, and Chinese in 140 countries and regions around the world. Issues are posted on a weekly basis with the twelve most recent issues being accessible to users for free. Additionally, users can read the first 100 pages of a title in the Digest section of the app. Most titles are serialized weekly, on any given day of the week.

== List of series run in Manga Box ==
Series title – The English title of the series, either used officially by Manga Box or unofficially by ANN or elsewhere, is shown first, then the Japanese title (if different from the English title) and then the romanized Japanese title (if appropriate). If there is no English title, the romanized title is then used.

Manga artist and author – If the series is authored and drawn by one person (or group), they will be listed in the Mangaka/Artist column (as the mangaka). If the series is a collaboration between an artist and author, the artist is shown in the third column and then the author in the fourth.

First and last issue – The first issue a series appeared on in Manga Box as well as the final issue. Displayed as formatted on the Kodansha Comic Plus website.

English – Answers whether or not a series was translated into English by Manga Box. This does not include other translators or publishers.

Translation status – Tells the English translation status of a series. Complete (in green) if a series was fully translated, Ongoing (in green) if a currently serialized series is actively translated, Stopped (in red) if the series was only partly translated, and N/A (in yellow) which is not applicable as the series was never translated in the first place. Translation Status does not included extra chapters found in tankōbon and only covers chapters serialized in Manga Box.

List of series
	Series title English / Japanese / Romanized	Manga artist	Author	First issue	Last issue	English	Translation status
2014
01	Araidoki. あらいどき。	Yūsuke Hashimoto	－	2014.01	2014.33	Yes	Complete
02	Billion Dogs ビリオンドッグズ (Birion Dogguzu)	Naoki Serizawa	Muneyuki Kaneshiro	2014.01	2017.08	Yes	Complete
03	Can't Ride a Bicycle! チャリに乗れない! (Chari ni Norenai!)	Hideki	－	2014.01	2015.38	Yes	Stopped
04	District Hakkenshi [code:T-8] 特区八犬士 [code:T-8] (Tokku Hakkenshi [code:T-8])	Kentarō & Saki Kurimoto	Rando Ayamine	2014.01	2015.29	Yes	Complete
05	First Love Suicide Pact 初恋心中 (Hatsukoi Shinjū)	Yosuke Suzaki	－	2014.01	2014.38	Yes	Complete
06	Girl and Car on the Beat パト娘 いっきまーす！ (Pato-ko Ikkimāsu!)	Akata Inubō	－	2014.01	2014.15	Yes	Complete
07	GREEN WORLDZ	Yūsuke Ōsawa	－	2014.01	2016.10	Yes	Complete
08	Ghost in the Shell: S.A.C. - The Laughing Man 攻殻機動隊 S.A.C. ～The Laughing Man	Yū Kinutani	－	2014.01	2016.42	No	N/A
09	High-rise Invasion 天空侵犯 (Tenkū Shinpan)	Takahiro Oba	Tsuina Miura	2014.01	Present	Yes	Ongoing
10	High School Ninja Girl, Otonashi-san くのいち女子高生 音無さん (Kunoichi Joshikōsei Otonashi-san)	Masami Watabe	－	2014.01	2015.13	Yes	Complete
11	Horizon ホライズン (Horaizun)	Takuya Okada	－	2014.01	2014.48	Yes	Complete
12	In a Heartbeat まばたきのあいだ (Mabataki no Aida)	Neruko Sugu	－	2014.01	2014.34	Yes	Complete
13	Kindaichi Case Files: Takato's Side 高遠少年の事件簿 (Takato Shōnen no Jikenbo)	Fumiya Satō	Seimaru Amagi	2014.01	2014.18	Yes	Complete
14	Man's Bestest Friend わんこナンバーわん (Wanko Nanbā Wan)	Hiroyuki Tamakoshi	－	2014.01	2015.08	Yes	Complete
15	My Grandpa's Stories Can't Be This Weird! 僕のおじいちゃんが変な話する！ (Boku no Ojīchan wa Hen na Hanashi suru!)	Kazuhiro Urata	－	2014.01	2014.46	Yes	Complete
16	Nadenade Shikoshiko. なでなでしこしこ。	Tarako Umeyama	－	2014.01	2014.33	Yes	Complete
17	Peephole 穴殺人 (Ana Satsujin)	Larsson	－	2014.01	2016.44	Yes	Complete
18	Schoolgirl Landlord Honoka セーラー服、ときどきエプロン (Sērā Fuku, Tokidoki Epuron)	Toshihiko Kobayashi	－	2014.01	2015.42	Yes	Stopped
19	Spoof on Titan 寸劇の巨人 (Sungeki no Kyojin)	hounori	－	2014.01	2015.03	Yes	Complete
20	Stra the Warlock 邪風のストラ (Kaze no Sutora)	Nawoya Iwata	－	2014.01	2015.07	Yes	Complete
21	The Chronicle of Akoya アコヤツタヱ (Akoya Tsutae)	Sho Sato	－	2014.01	2014.42	Yes	Complete
22	The Great Phrases Women Fall For 女に惚れさす名言集 (Onna ni Horesasu Meigenshū)	Jigoku no Misawa	－	2014.01	Present	Yes	Stopped
23	The Knight in the Area (spin-off) エリアの騎士 外伝 ～江ノ高アーリーデイズ～ (Eria no Kishi Gaiden: Enokō Ārī Deizu)	Kaya Tsukiyama	Hiroaki Igano	2014.01	2014.39	Yes	Complete
24	I Was Human 人間でした (Ningen Deshita)	Kikonomi	Hyakurai	2014.03	2014.17	Yes	Complete
25	Logick ロジック (Rojikku)	Takuma Nishimaki	－	2014.03	2014.52	Yes	Complete
26	Too Much Booty おにもて (Onimote)	Kaname Yamanashi	－	2014.09	2016.15	Yes	Stopped
27	Old Man Frog 蛙のおっさん (Kaeru no Ossan)	Zenyū Shimabukuro	－	2014.10	2015.17	Yes	Stopped
28	Milk on the Farm! 酪農みるく! (Rakunō Miruku!)	Yōko Sanri	－	2014.11	2015.30	Yes	Stopped
29	Bushido Academy たけだけだけ-武田系限定- (Take Dake Dake!: Takedakei Gentei)	Tomoe Kasahara	－	2014.12	2014.39	Yes	Complete
30	Fat Chaser でぶせん (Debusen)	Masashi Asaki	Yūma Ando	2014.12	2014.21	No	N/A
31	Tawara Cat たわら猫とまちがい人生 (Tawara Neko to Machigai Jinsei)	Torako Hidaka	－	2014.12	2016.04	Yes	Stopped
32	Chika Sugi Idol Akae-chan 地下すぎアイドルあかえちゃん	Getsumin, Rieko Matsumura	Chika-Sugi Idol Seisaku Īnkai	2014.13	Present	No	N/A
33	Destroyed Century JOXER 崩壊世紀JOXER (Hōkai Seiki Joxer)	SERA WORKS	－	2014.13	2015.03	Yes	Complete
34	Shinjuku DxD 新宿D×D	Pon Jea	Yūma Ando	2014.13	2016.15	Yes	Complete
35	Student Council~Total Takeover! 生徒会総占拠 (Seitokai Sōsenkyo)	Yatsuki	－	2014.13	2014.31	Yes	Complete
36	Genji the Death's Friend 東京ゲンジ物語 (Tokyo Genji Monogatari)	Minami Ozaki	Seimaru Amagi	2014.15	2015.07	Yes	Stopped
37	Why Can't I Get a Girlfriend? なぜ東堂院聖也16歳は彼女が出来ないのか? (Naze Tōdōin Seiya 16-sai wa Kanojo ga Dekinai no ka?)	Kanta Mogi	Shuya Uchino	2014.16	2015.39	Yes	Complete
38	BEYOND EVIL アクノヒガン (Aku no Higan)	Ogino	Miura	2014.18	2015.35	Yes	Complete
39	Oh God! Dear God! はらたまきよたま (Haratama Kiyotama)	Akane Nagano	－	2014.18	2014.34	Yes	Complete
40	The Wheel of Life 流転のテルマ (Ruten no Teruma)	Kuranishi	－	2014.18	2016.07	Yes	Stopped
41	Eyaminokami: The Plague Princess えやみのかみ	Hirokazu Ochiai	Tooru Fujisawa	2014.19	2015.51	Yes	Stopped
42	Red Blood Red Legacy 赤赫血物語 (Akāka to Shita Chi no Monogatari)	Kaishaku	－	2014.19	2017.14	Yes	Complete
43	Money Fight マネーファイト (Manē Faito)	Mix Up	－	2014.20	2016.08	Yes	Complete
44	Kindaichi Case Files: The Mini-Vacation 金田一少年の1泊2日小旅行 (Kindaichi Shōnen no 1-ppaku 2-ka Shōryokō)	Bako Awa	Seimaru Amagi & Fumiya Satō	2014.21	2017.01	Yes	Complete
45	Mission in the South! みなみっしょん! (Minamisshon!)	Hiyori Mikagami	Tōru Hisaka	2014.21	2015.12	Yes	Stopped
46	Zero Gravity Girl 無重力ガール (Mujūryoku Gāru)	Yukari Yagi	Daichi Banjō	2014.21	2015.15	No	N/A
47	Psycho Romantica サイコろまんちか (Saiko Romanchika)	Motoki Koide	－	2014.22	2015.35	No	N/A
48	The Host-man ホスト漫 (Hosuto-man)	Satoshi Kinoshita	－	2014.23	2015.13	Yes	Complete
49	The Godlike Gambler ARIMARIA (prequel) 天啓のアリマリア Once Upon a Time (Tenkei no Arimaria)	Itora	Kenji Sakumoto	2014.27	2014.31	Yes	Complete
50	MitchiriNeko みっちりねこ	Mitchiri Company	－	2014.28	Present	No	N/A
51	I Am Space Dandy 俺 スペース☆ダンディ (Ore Supēsu☆Dandi)	Katsumata Hiroki	BONES	2014.29	2014.46	No	N/A
52	Shion of the Dead 詩音 OF THE DEAD	Takashi Muroyoshi	－	2014.33	2015.44	Yes	Stopped
53	We've got a slight fever. 摂氏100 °Cの微熱 (Sesshi 100 °C Binetsu)	Takeshi Okamoto	Aya Nozaki	2014.33	2015.36	No	N/A
54	Zero 零 影巫女 (Zero: Kage Miko)	hakus	Seimaru Amagi, Koei Tecmo Games	2014.33	2017.34	Yes	Complete
55	Sword of Twins 妖刀 あらしとふぶき (Yōtō: Arashi to Fubuki)	Dra	－	2014.35	2014.35	No	N/A
56	Love and Lies 恋と嘘 (Koi to Uso)	Musawo Tsumugi	－	2014.36	Present	Yes	Ongoing
57	Dolly Kill Kill ドリィキルキル (Dori Kiru Kiru)	Yūsuke Nomura	Yukiaki Kurando	2014.37	Present	Yes	Ongoing
58	Kazuki Makes Love Happen?! at ALL-BOYS High School 湯河原くんは大山田男子高校でモテる方法を考えていたが (Yugawara-kun wa Ōyamada Danshi Kōkō de Moteru Hōhō wo Kangaeteita ga)	Shuya Uchino	－	2014.37	2015.32	Yes	Complete
59	I'm Obsessed With My Little Bro! 姉弟ほど近く遠いものはない (Kyōdai hodo Chikaku Tōimono wa Nai)	Kure Fuyujima	Hatsumi Ogi	2014.39	2017.02	Yes	Stopped
60	Online オンライン The Comic (Onrain)	Tsukasa Kyoka	Midori Amagaeru	2014.39	Present	Yes	Ongoing
61	Yukikaze White Wind: The Legend of Meiji Era Martial Arts. 明治異種格闘伝 雪風 (Meiji Ishu Kakutō Den: Yukikaze)	Kōhei Uchida	－	2014.41	2015.31	Yes	Complete
62	A World Without Boundaries 境界のないセカイ (Kyōkai no Nai Sekai)	Daikokudō Ikuya	－	2014.42	2015.14	Yes	Complete
63	Blackout: The Enigmatic Game ブラックアウト (Burakkuauto)	Kazuo Maekawa	Ransuke Kuroi	2014.42	2016.36	Yes	Complete
64	B-Ball Goddess バスケの女神さま (Basuke no Megami-sama)	Keyaki Uchiuchi	－	2014.43	2016.02	Yes	Complete
65	Holiday Love ホリデイラブ 〜夫婦間恋愛〜 (Horidei Rabu: Fūfukan Renai)	Eliza Kusakabe	Yukari Koyama	2014.43	Present	Yes	Ongoing
66	Fling Girls スマ倫な彼女たち (Sumarin Kanojo-tachi)	Ryuji Okita	－	2014.44	2017.12	Yes	Complete
67	Our Reason for Living 僕たちの生きた理由 (Bokutachi no Ikita Riyū)	Kazuyuki Watanabe	－	2014.44	2017.16	Yes	Complete
68	The Obligatory Harem Contract 強制ハーレム契約 (Kyōsei Hāremu Keiyaku)	Azumi Mochizuki	SNACK Gori	2014.47	2015.45	Yes	Complete
69	The Sentirental Girl センチレンタル少女 (Senchirentaru Shōjo)	Nao Ninatsu	－	2014.48	2016.01	Yes	Complete
70	Le Vin, Wine Burglar 怪盗ルヴァン (Kaitō ru Van)	Shū Okimoto	Tadashi Agi	2014.49	2015.02	Yes	Complete
71	Ebisu Gakuen Sunday Class Detectives 恵比寿学園中等科日曜補習組探偵団 (Ebisu Gakuen Chūtōka Nichiyō Hoshūgumi Tanteidan)	Mei Renjōji	TKKT	2014.50	2015.45	Yes	Stopped
72	Wild Fancy Dynamite! ワイルドファンシーダイナマイト！ (Wairudo Fanshī Dainamaito!)	Fumuarunukufamuppuaffa	－	2014.50	2016.30	Yes	Stopped
73	That's Ultra Painful! ウルトラつらいぜ (Urutora Tsurai ze)	Eri Tarada	Mitsuyoshi Takasu	2014.51	2015.15	No	N/A
2015
74	Roppongi Black Cross 六本木ブラッククロス (Roppongi Burakku Kurosu)	Yōsuke Mori	Kimio Yanagisawa	2015.01	2016.21	Yes	Complete
75	"Nisekoi" 偽コイ同盟。 (Nisekoi Dōmei)	Ayano	Aoi Sakaki	2015.02	2017.08	Yes	Complete
76	Chubby Cinderella ふぁっとシンデレラ!! (Fatto Shinderara!!)	Makoto Suzukawa	RiSe	2015.02	2015.19	Yes	Complete
77	Hana the Fox Girl しましま花狐 (Shima Shima Hanako)	Chima	－	2015.02	2015.21	Yes	Stopped
78	Joker Zero: Gang Road ジョーカーZERO～ギャングロード～ (Jōkā ZERO: Gyangu Rōdo)	Applibot, Inc.	－	2015.06	2016.04	No	N/A
79	Record of a Peaceful Swordsman 剣客太平記 (Kenkaku Taiheiki)	Kanetamaru	Satoru Okamoto	2015.08	2016.04	No	N/A
80	School x Blockade 学園×封鎖 (Gakuen x Fūsa)	Nykken	Michio Yazu	2015.10	Present	No	N/A
81	King's Cross キングスクロス (Kingusu Kurosu)	Aya Hasumi	－	2015.11	2015.46	No	N/A
82	That's Life When You're a Woman 女なのでしょうがない (Onna nano de Shōganai)	Yoshiko Kon	－	2015.14	2016.24	Yes	Stopped
83	Drowning Brute and Sweet Trap 溺れる獣と甘い罠 (Oboreru Kemono to Amai Wana)	Maho Matsusaki	Juri Hakamada	2015.15	2016.01	No	N/A
84	Nijihama Love Story 虹浜ラブストーリー (Nijihama Rabu Sutōrī)	Natsuo Motomachi	Fumi Saimon	2015.17	2016.27	No	N/A
85	Oyobi desu ka!? Hacka Doll 召喚ですか!? ハッカドール	Yatsuki	Hacka Doll Team	2015.17	2016.01	No	N/A
86	After the Rain Comes Fine Zombie Weather 雨のち晴れゾン日和 (Ame Nochi Hare Zombiyori)	Ryūtarō Kiyomizu	－	2015.18	2016.02	No	N/A
87	Konna Henshuusha to Nete wa Ikenai こんな編集者と寝てはいけない	Mahiro Naka	－	2015.20	2016.01	No	N/A
88	B: Brahms 20-sai no Tabiji; B ブラームス20歳の旅路	Rusukey	－	2015.22	2017.03	No	N/A
89	Hijikata-san is Full of Lies 土方さんは嘘だらけ (Hijikata-san wa Usodarake)	Kikonomi	－	2015.22	2016.09	No	N/A
90	Survival: S Boy's Records サバイバル～少年Sの記録～ (Survival: Shōnen S no Kiroku)	Akira Miyagawa	Takao Saitō	2015	2018	No	Complete
91	Island of Petals 花びらの島 (Hanabira no Shima)	Masaya Shimoda	－	2015.26	2015.50	No	N/A
92	K.O.K: King of Kuzu; K.O.K-キング・オブ・クズ-	Hiroaki Shimada	Hodai Mizu	2015.31	2016.50	No	N/A
93	Yamamoto's Girlfriend is a D-Girl ヤマト君の彼女はD少女 (Yamato-kun no Kanojo wa D Shōjo)	Suzuki Aru	－	2015.32	2016.14	No	N/A
94	Avengers: Zombies Assemble アベンジャーズ／ゾンビ・アセンブル	Yūsaka Komiyama	－	2015.35	2016.27	No	N/A
95	Samurai Half サムライハーフ (Samurai Hāfu)	Shuku Asaoka	－	2015.36	2016.48	No	N/A
96	Blue Sky Rubber 青空ラバー (Aozora Rabā)	Kouji Miura	－	2015.38	2016.15	No	N/A
97	Chupaca-Love ちゅぱからぶ (Chupaka-rabu)	Lucy Tokuyama	－	2015.41	2016.32	No	N/A
98	Momo Momo Momota-san もももも百田さん	Kazuhiro Urata	－	2015.41	2016.26	No	N/A
99	Tap Couple タップ couple (Tappu Couple)	Hiroyuki Tamakoshi	－	2015.45	2016.03	No	N/A
100	Egoist Blue エゴイストブルー (Egoisuto Burū)	Gino0808	－	2015.47	Present	No	N/A
101	Embanmaze エンバンメイズ (Embanmeizu)	Ikkō Tanaka	－	2015.51	2016.46	No	N/A
2016
102	Rolling Clutch Hold Me! ロリクラ☆ほーるど！ (Rorikura☆Hōrudo!)	KOMANDO	Chihaya	2016.04	2016.46	No	N/A
103	Sweet Bitter スイートビター (Suīto Bitā)	Yui Sakuraba	Ayapan	2016.08	2017.19	No	N/A
104	Secret Badminton Club 男子バド部に女子が紛れてる (Danshi Bado-bu ni Joshi ga Magireteru)	Satoru Nii	－	2016.09	2017.37	No	N/A
105	The Devil Is Not So Black as He Is Painted 育てち魔おう！ (Sodatechi Maō!)	Kousuke Ijima	－	2016.12	Present	No	N/A
106	Kaibou Kitan 怪貌綺譚	Rokuro	－	2016.16	2016.45	No	N/A
107	Shu ni Majiwareba 朱にまじわれば	Junpei Kawasaki	－	2016.21	2017.20	No	N/A
108	Until Your Bones Rot 骨が腐るまで	Utsumi Yae	－	2016.22	Present	No	N/A
109	Baby God ベイビーゴッド 残虐と純情のメジェドさま	Akira Segami	－	2016.24	2017.18	No	N/A
110	Maradona: Road to Glory マラドーナ 栄光の道 (Maradona: Eikō no Michi)	Kunikazu Toda	－	2016.25	2016.25	No	N/A
111	Hell's Cauldron is Opening 地獄の釜の蓋を開けろ (Jigoku no Gama no Buta o Akeru)	En Kitō	－	2016.27	2016.36	No	N/A
112	Eternal Frandear 永遠のフランディア (Eien no Furandia)	Nawoya Iwata	Akihito Yoshitomo	2016.30	2017.03	No	N/A
113	Front of Death Island Extermination 死島戦線EX (Shitou Sensen EX)	Shuya Uchino	－	2016.37	2017.31	No	N/A
114	Tragedy of the Girl A 少女Aの悲劇 (Shōjo A no Higeki)	Asano	Rikito Nakamura	2016.40	2017.28	No	N/A
115	Tenryūhai 天竜牌	Katsunori Matsui	Hikaru Sugii	2016.39	2017.36	No	N/A
116	I Was Human 2nd Season 人間でした 2ndシーズン (Ningen Deshita 2nd Shīzun)	Kikonomi	Hyakurai	2016.43	2017.16	No	N/A
117	Liars are the Beginning of First Love うそつきは初恋のはじまり (Usotsuki wa Hatsukoi no Hajimaru)	Rei Nishijima	－	2016.44	2017.38	No	N/A
118	Bunguri Korokoro ぶんぐりころころ	Masaki Andō	－	2016.45	March 12, 2018	No	N/A
119	Venus Fly Trap 女神のまつげ (Megami no Hatsuge)	Hiro Suruga	－	2016.46	Present	No	N/A
120	Hour of Bullying イジメの時間 (Ijime no Jikan)	Kunirou	－	2016.47	Present	No	N/A
121	Hitori & Ippiki とりぴき (Toripiki)	Ran Kuze	－	2016.48	2017.23	No	N/A
122	Dreaming Fingertip ゆめみるゆびさき (Yumemiru Yubisaki)	Ayapan	－	2016.49	2017.04	No	N/A
123	Yadori Ishi 憑石	Ichimi Minamoto	－	2016.50	2017.04	No	N/A
124	Your Garden. 君の庭。(Kimi no Niwa)	Nao Kōda	－	2016.52	2017.41	No	N/A
125	liar	Maho Matsusaki	Moarasu	2016.53	2017.27	No	N/A
2017
125	Love Triangle Banquet 三角的恋愛の饗宴 (Sankakuteki Renai no Kyouen)	Torako Hidaka	－	2017.01	Present	No	N/A
126	Doctor Strange ドクター・ストレンジ (Dokutā Sutorenji)	Haruichi	－	2017.01	2017.17	No	N/A
127	B5 Princess; B5姫 (B5 Hime)	Natsuto	－	2017.02	2017.16	No	N/A
128	Desperate na Reijō デスパレートな令嬢たち (Desuparēto na Reijō)	Minami Yaita	－	2017.06	2017.45	No	N/A
129	Sakura-chan さくらちゃん	Daigo Wakato	－	2017.08	2017.17	No	N/A
130	Eater's Fang 捕食者の牙 (Hoshokusha no Kiba)	Ayumi Urayama	－	2017.08	2017.37	No	N/A
131	The Green Ranger Doesn't Stand Out Enough 戦隊グリーンは目立たない (Sentai Gurīn wa Medatanai)	Nigadango	－	2017.14	2017.24	No	N/A
132	Human Card 人間カード (Ningen Kādo)	Makoto Shiozuka	Ransuke Kuroi	2017.15	Present	No	N/A
133	Rear Guard Otasa オタサーの殿 (Otasā no Shingari)	Inko Sekisei	－	2017.17	2017.27	No	N/A
134	Deviant Love 異常者の愛 (Ijōsha no Ai)	Daisuke Chida	－	2017.17	Present	No	N/A
135	The Circumstances of Today's Video Stores 本日のビデオ屋事情 (Honjitsu no Bideoya Jijō)	Ouko Surume	－	2017.18	2017.29	No	N/A
136	Futari no Zero Jiba 二人のゼロジバ	Rahson	－	2017.22	Present	No	N/A
137	Tonde Hi ni Iru Tekireiki 飛んで火にいる適齢期	Momota Nakahara	Yoshiko Kon	2017.23	2018.08	No	N/A
138	Psychogenic Mental Mermaid 心因性メンタルマーメイド (Shininsei Mentaru Māmeido)	Natsumi Inoue	Shikasuke Tanaka	2017.24	Present	No	N/A
139	Private Practice Police of Tactics 私人警察 (Jijin Keisatsu)	Ryō Ogawa	－	2017.29	2018.14	No	N/A
140	Baby Returns: An Account of Reliving Life ベビーリターンズ ～人生やり直し記～ (Bebī Ritānsu: Jinsei Yarinaoshiki)	Kōsuke Katō	－	2017.31	2018.08	No	N/A
141	Pet Girl 2nd Season 少女ペット2nd season (Shōjo Petto 2nd season)	Fushō Sakusha	Kokonotsu Shinohara	2017.33	Present	No	N/A
141	Grey Coloured Song ハイイロノウタ (Haīro no Uta)	Kaguya Hinase	－	2017.34	Present	No	N/A
142	Life Game; LIFE GAME	Nade Takuse	uta	2017.35	Present	No	N/A
143	Death and Colors 屍領域 (Kabane Ryōiki)	Ōmae Takashi	－	2017.35	2018.15	No	N/A
144	LeT's Play wiTh The deaTh! 死因とあそぼ！ (Shiin to Asobo!)	Meidai Kawasaki	－	2017.36	2018.09	No	N/A
145	Human Factory 人間工場 (Ningen Enjō)	Hitoki Nishiya	－	2017.38	Present	No	N/A
146	A Girl in the Sex Industry Became a Rich Man's Bride 元風俗嬢が金持ち妻になりました (Motofūzokujō ga Kanemochizuma ni Narimashita)	Katsumi Yagi	Honoka Kanau	2017.39	Present	No	N/A
147	Dear Hokku; Dearほっく	Denim Asakawa	Yuki Takemura	2017.40	Present	No	N/A
148	Real Enjō: GPS リアル炎上「GPS」	Kōtetsu	Jōta Kanda	2017.41	Present	No	N/A
149	Dead Ranking デッドランキング (Deddo Rankingu)	Akitsugu Mizutomo	▼☆Waka☆▽	2017.42	Present	No	N/A
150	I will change you 僕が君を変える (Boku ga Kimi o Kaeru)	Misono	－	2017.43	Present	No	N/A
151	Shokujin Gochū 蝕人孤蟲	Satoshi Yoshiako	－	2017.44	Present	No	N/A
2018
152	Sōshō Immortal Flower 創傷イモータルフラワー	Tsukasa Ryūgū	Nekotarō Inui	2018.07	Present	No	N/A
