= Love and Lies (2017 film) =

- Japanese theatrical release poster

Japanese name
- Kanji: 恋と嘘
Transcriptions
- Revised Hepburn: Koi to Uso
- Directed by: Takeshi Furusawa
- Written by: Erika Yoshida
- Based on: Love and Lies by Musawo
- Produced by: Toshihisa Ohata; Yoshikazu Yanagi; Akihiko Takaishi
- Starring: Aoi Morikawa; Takumi Kitamura; Kanta Satô; Nana Asakawa; Momoko Tanabe; Rieko Miura; Shōzō Endō; Houka Kinoshita; Yoshimi Tokui
- Edited by: Toshirō Matsutake
- Music by: Ryo Yoshimata
- Production companies: HDYMP Showgate; Avex Pictures; Kodansha; A-Sketch; Avex Music Publishing; The Icon; DeNA
- Distributed by: HDYMP Showgate
- Release date: October 14, 2017 (Japan)
- Running time: 110 minutes
- Country: Japan
- Language: Japanese

Love and Lies (Japanese: 恋と嘘, Hepburn: Koi to Uso) is a 2017 Japanese romantic drama film directed by Takeshi Furusawa from a screenplay by Erika Yoshida, based on the manga series of the same name by Musawo. The film stars Aoi Morikawa as Aoi Nisaka, the lead heroine; Takumi Kitamura as Yūto Siba, Aoi's childhood friend; and Kanta Satō as Sōsuke Takachino, Aoi's arranged partner. Unlike the manga series, which features a love triangle between one boy and two girls, the film's love triangle involves one girl and two boys. The film was released in Japan on October 14, 2017. A visual for that film was unveiled on May 17, 2017.

== Cast ==
- Aoi Morikawa as Aoi Nisaka
- Takumi Kitamura as Yūto Siba
- Kanta Sato as Sōsuke Takachiho
- Nana Asakawa as Konatsu
- Momoko Tanabe as Akiho
- Rieko Miura as Nizaka Marie
- Shōzō Endō as Yoichi Nisaka
- Houka Kinoshita as Takuto Takachiho
- Hiroko Nakajima as Kasumi Takachiho
- Yōichi Nukumizu as Crepe Vendor
- Yoshimi Tokui as Prof. Daisuke Yotsuya
