= Masashi Asaki =

Japanese manga artist

Masashi Asaki (朝基まさし, Asaki Masashi, born 2 March 1970 in Osaka, Japan) is a Japanese manga artist. He is best known as the artist for the series Psychometrer Eiji and Kunimitsu no Matsuri, both written by Shin Kibayashi under the name Ando Yuma, and both of which have been adapted into live-action dramas. His current series, which he both writes and draws, is Denshi no Hoshi. All three series are unusual for shōnen manga in dealing with political themes. With Agi, he received the 2003 Kodansha Manga Award for shōnen for Kunimitsu no Matsuri.

He was an assistant to Tsukasa Ōshima.
