= List of O-Parts Hunter chapters =

The cover of the first volume of O-Parts Hunter as published by Square Enix on December 20, 2001, in Japan.

The following is a list of chapters of the Japanese manga series O-Parts Hunter. Written and illustrated by Seishi Kishimoto, 666 Satan was originally serialized by Enix (later Square Enix) in the magazine Monthly Shōnen Gangan from 2001 to 2007. The 79 chapters were collected into 19 tankōbon volumes. It was licensed for an English release in North America by Viz Media, who released it under the title O-Parts Hunter.

== Volume list ==
| No. | Original release date | Original ISBN | English release date | English ISBN |
|---|---|---|---|---|
| 01 | December 20, 2001 | 4-7575-0597-3 | December 12, 2006 | 1-4215-0855-9 |
01. "Friends" (友達, "Tomodachi"); 02. "The Dream 1" (夢1, "Yume 1"); 03. "The Dream 2" (夢2, "Yume 2")
| 02 | May 22, 2002 | 4-7575-0697-X | February 13, 2007 | 1-4215-0856-7 |
04. "The 5 Rings" (五連オーパーツ, "Go Ren Ō Pātsu"); 05. "A Lone Wolf" (一匹狼, "Ippiki Ōkami"); 06. "Fangs" (牙, "Kiba"); 07. "The Misty City" (霧の街, "Kiri no Machi"); 08. "Resistance Movement" (反政府組織, "Rejisutansu")
| 03 | October 2002 | 4-7575-0810-7 | April 10, 2007 | 1-4215-0855-9 |
09. "The Crimson Magician" (深紅の奇術師, "Kurimuzon no Majishan"); 10. "Escape!!" (脱出!!, "Esukēpu!!"); 11. "The Power of the Ancient Civilization" (超古代人の力, "Chōkodaijin no Chikara"); 12. "The Three Ordeals" (3つの試練, "Mittsu no Shiren"); 13. "Kirin?!"
| 04 | February 2003 | 4-7575-0873-5 | June 12, 2007 | 1-4215-0858-3 |
14. "Two Against One" (二対一, "Ni Tai Ichi"); 15. "Go, Bat-man!!" (燃えろバットマン!!, "Moero Battoman!!"); 16. "Mexis Activated!!" (メキシス始動!!, "Mekishisu Shidō!!"); 17. "The Power of a God" (神の力, "Kami no Chikara")
| 05 | June 21, 2003 | 4-7575-0963-4 | August 14, 2007 | 1-4215-0859-1 |
18. "Marching Along the Winding Road" (グネグネ道 突進, "Gunegunedō Tosshin"); 19. "Everybody's Thoughts and Feelings" (それぞれの想い, "Sorezore no Omoi"); 20. "Final Operation" (最終作戦, "Saishū Sakusen"); 21. "Everybody's Hearts as One" (一つになる心, "Hitotsu ni Naru Kokoro"); 22. "A Pact With the Devil" (悪魔の契約, "Akuma no Keiyaku")
| 06 | November 22, 2003 | 4-7575-1072-1 | October 9, 2007 | 1-4215-0860-5 |
23. "Archenemy" (宿敵, "Shukuteki"); 24. "Blue Sky" (青空, "Aozora"); "Side Story: Justice" (外伝 ジャスティス, "Gaiden Jasutisu"); "Trigger" (トリガー, "Torigā")
| 07 | February 21, 2004 | 4-7575-1143-4 | December 11, 2007 | 1-4215-0861-3 |
25. "The Legend of Spirit" (スピリッツの伝説, "Supirittsu no Densetsu"); 26. "Kabbalah" (カバラ, Kabara); 27. "Mom and Dad" (父さん 母さん, "Tōsan Kaasan"); 28. "Black Market Caravan" (闇のキャラバン, "Yami no Kyaraban")
| 08 | June 2004 | 4-7575-1220-1 | February 12, 2008 | 1-4215-1526-1 |
29. "The Fated Two" (導かれし二人, "Michibikareshi Ninin"); 30. "The Kabbalah's Angel" (カバラの天使, "Kabara no Reshipi"); 31. "Olympia's Prelim Round" (オリンピア予選開始, "Orinpia Yosen Kaishi"); 32. "The Chosen Two" (選ばれた2名, "Erabareta 2 Mei")
| 09 | October 22, 2004 | 4-7575-1296-1 | April 8, 2008 | 1-4215-1831-7 |
33. "Rock Bird" (怪鳥ロックバード, "Kai Tori Rokku Bādo"); 34. "The Main Round Begins" (オリンピア本戦開始!, "Orinpia Honsen Kaishi!"); 35. "The Promise" (約束, "Yakusoku"); 36. "Maximum Volume" (最大のボリューム, "Saidai no Boryūmu")
| 10 | February 22, 2005 | 4-7575-1363-1 | June 10, 2008 | 1-4215-1832-5 |
37. "A Real Monster, Part 1" (本物のバケモノ①, "Honmono no Bakemono 1"); 38. "A Real Monster, Part 2" (本物のバケモノ②, "Honmono no Bakemono 2"); 39. "The Bird Inside a Cage" (籠の中の鳥, "Kago no Naka no Tori"); 40. "The Shape of One's Heart" (心と形, "Kokoro to Katachi")
| 11 | June 22, 2005 | 4-7575-1454-9 | September 2, 2008 | 1-4215-1833-3 |
41. "Hope" (希望, "Kibō"); 42. "Rival!?" (ライバル!?, "Raibaru!?"); 43. "Theory of the World" (世界の理, "Sekai no Ri"); 44. "The Big Bang" (ビッグバン, "Biggu Ban")
| 12 | October 22, 2005 | 4-7575-1551-0 | October 14, 2008 | 1-4215-1834-1 |
45. "Top Floor" (最上階, "Saijōkai"); 46. "Evil King Icarus" (魔帝イカロス, "Matei Ikarosu"); 47. "Heart" (心, "Kokoro"); 48. "Kaballah's Devil" (カバラの悪魔, "Kabara no Akuma")
| 13 | February 22, 2006 | 4-7575-1624-X | December 9, 2008 | 1-4215-1835-X |
49. "Figure" (激闘, "Gekitō"); 50. "1 Hit" (一撃, "Ichigeki"); 51. "Light and Dark" (光と闇, "Hikari to Yami"); 52. "The Key of Solomon" (ソロモンの鍵, "Soromon no Kagi")
| 14 | June 22, 2006 | 4-7575-1701-7 | February 10, 2009 | 1-4215-1995-X |
53. "Bonds" (繋がり, "Tsunagari"); 54. "Ancient People" (古代種, "Kodaishu"); 55. "Legendary O-Parts" (伝説のオーパーツ, "Densetsu no Ō Pātsu"); 56. "New Member" (新仲間, "Shin Menbā")
| 15 | October 21, 2006 | 4-7575-1796-3 | April 14, 2009 | 1-4215-1996-8 |
57. "Break In!" (突入!!, "Totsunyū!!"); 58. "Everyone's Fight" (それぞれの戦い, "Sorezore no Tatakai"); 59. "Magic Trick" (おまじない, "Omajinai"); 60. "Miko's Truth" (ミコの思想, "Miko no Shisō")
| 16 | March 22, 2007 | 4-7575-1983-4 | June 9, 2009 | 1-4215-1997-6 |
61. "Welcome Home" (おかえり, "Okaeri"); 62. "All Members Gather" (全メンバー集結, "Zen Menbā Shūketsu"); 63. "Full Moon" (月夜, "Tsukiyo"); 64. "Zenom's Headquarters" (ゼノム本部, "Zenomu Honbu")
| 17 | June 22, 2007 | 4-7575-2026-3 | August 11, 2009 | 1-4215-2227-6 |
65. "The Ruins' Traps!" (遺跡の罠!!, "Iseki no Wana!!"); 66. "Heart" (心, "Kokoro"); 67. "Brothers Face Off! Memories of the Scars!" (兄弟対決!! キズの記憶, "Kyōdai Taiketsu!! Kizu no Kioku"); 68. "Father's Thoughts" (父の想い, "Chichi no Omoi")
| 18 | October 22, 2007 | 4-7575-2129-4 | October 13, 2009 | 1-4215-2339-6 |
69. "Life" (命, "Inochi"); 70. "The Heart of a Woman" (女心, "Onnagokoro"); 71. "Devil's Summoner" (デビルズサマナー, "Debiruzu Samanā"); 72. "2 Battles" (二つの闘い, "Futatsu no Tatakai")
| 19 | February 22, 2008 | 4-7575-2216-9 | December 8, 2009 | 1-4215-2567-4 |
73. "Zenom" (ゼノム, "Zenomu"); 74. "Pinky Swear" (指切り, "Yubikiri"); 75. "Armageddon" (ハルマゲドン, "Harumagedon"); 76. "Jio Freed" (ジオ=フリード, "Jio Furīdo")
