= Blazer Drive =

Japanese manga series

- Cover of the first tankōbon volume of Blazer Drive, as published by Kodansha on August 4, 2008

ブレイザードライブ (Bureizā Doraibu)
- Manga
- Written by: Seishi Kishimoto
- Published by: Kodansha
- Magazine: Monthly Shōnen Rival
- Original run: April 4, 2008 – December 29, 2010
- Volumes: 9
- Video game
- Developer: Sega
- Publisher: Sega
- Music by: Tomonori Sawada; Naofumi Hataya
- Genre: RPG
- Platform: Nintendo DS
- Released: December 4, 2008

Blazer Drive (ブレイザードライブ, Bureizā Doraibu) is a Japanese manga series written and illustrated by Seishi Kishimoto, creator of 666 Satan, and was published in Shōnen Rival. Sega also developed a Nintendo DS game using a parallel story.

== Plot ==
Taking place in a futuristic style of Tokyo, Japan. Society has harnessed the power of the elements into items known as "Mystickers" which give off various effects depending on which is used and can be applied to everyday housework or even combat. Daichi is a young teen that resents his older brother but finds comfort in his dealings with friends. After an encounter with some bullies Daichi discovers he has the potential to become a Blazer, people who are able to apply these "Mystickers" unto their skin without causing harm to their own bodies. It isn't after another deadly encounter with an unknown assailant of an organization that's targeting him that Daichi learns of his fate and that of his brother. At the cost of something precious, Daichi sets out to reclaim that which was taken, embarking on a dangerous quest with a new resolve and a powerful "Mysticker" of his own.

== Setting ==
=== Mystickers ===
Mystickers are stickers that have special powers that can be placed on anything and anywhere. Mystickers are activated by first adhering them on a flat surface and then the user should trace the patterns imprinted on the Mysticker with their fingers. Qilin Mystickers are rare type of Mysticker and rumored that only five are in existence and that each Quilin mysticker chooses its owner. The five are Black Kakutan, White Sakumei, Blue Shouko, Crimson Enku, and Yellow Qilin.

=== Blazers ===
Blazers are a group of special people that are able to control the power of the MyStickers by sticking them onto their own bodies and manipulating their power. The strength of a Blazer comes from the power of the mind and concentration. If a Blazer has mastered those abilities, their powers will be at their maximum, and the sticker will be impossible to pull off by anyone other than the Blazer who is using the sticker. If the Blazer's mind is not concentrated, the Blazer will hurt himself and the sticker will easily peel off.

There are certain stickers that do not have any particular effect when used by normal people, but can be activated when used by a Blazer.

== Chapters ==
No.	Japanese release date	Japanese ISBN
01	August 4, 2008	978-4-06-380002-9
01. The Inheritance; 02. The Decision of Setting Off; 03. Starting Mission
Daichi gets himself into a battle with Team Typhoon while trying to help someone. The fight goes on to a point where Misora gets injured and Daichi's brother, Ginga, saves them by blinding the Typhoon members with a Mysticker. Daichi gets into a fight with Ginga because of his rescue. Misora later on tries to cheer Daichi up with a Mysticker she found. He decides to show it to Ginga, but the mysticker gets ripped by Ginga. Daichi is upset and goes for a walk where he suddenly meets a hostile Blazer. The hostile Blazer reveals that the Mysticker Ginga ripped up was a trap. After an intense battle, Daichi loses Ginga to the hostile Blazer's warping Mysticker after Ginga reveals he and Daichi are Blazers, but gets the Mysticker the "God Stand" which instantly fries the enemy Blazer. The chapter ends with an emotional meeting with Ginga's ally, Kuroki, who offers his hand in support and friendship. Daichi and Kuroki head back to Daichi's house. A little later in the house, as Daichi is reminiscing over a picture, Kuroki cuts in and explains the evil Blazers, or Nora-Bure. Nora-Bure are soldiers for hire with a well built system, and Kuroki and Ginga are part of an organization built to stop them. Kuroki tries to reassure Daichi that Ginga is still alive, and Daichi resolves his sorrows by declaring that he will become stronger because of a promise he made to Ginga. After they go to Team Sky's base so they can leave Shiro, the family dog which Kuroki has a dislike toward. Just as Daichi was about to make his exit, Misora catches up. Daichi appears as if he's going to explain but simply says sorry for the accident earlier that day and tells her to take care of Shiro. Daichi is then brought to The Guardian Division's hangout, where Kuroki disappears as three Blazers appear and start beating on Daichi. He thinks about what his brother had said: that he was "doing nothing but picking fights", which made Daichi choose to stand down, opting not to pick a fight. Soon the first guy reveals he's a Blazer and is about to finish Daichi when Misora shows up. Kuroki comes out revealing it was just a test, which Daichi passed. After Daichi beats the blazer using his sticker, Kuroki quickly heals both fighters. After all that, he gets heckled at his new allies for protecting Misora without a second delay and explains to her the whole tale and since it is easy for info to leak out they place Misora under their watch. After passing the test, Daichi and Misora are taken to the Guardian Division by Kuroki. They meet up with the Division Head and she immediately gives Daichi and Kuroki a mission to retrieve a rare Mysticker that has been stolen.
02	December 4, 2008	978-4-06-380018-0
04. Showdown at 003; 05. Requirement to Become Superior; 06. Misora's Will
Daichi manages to defeat the thief Yuuma and successfully retrieves the rare Mysticker. As soon when he wants to leave, he yet again faces someone who thinks Daichi is Yuuma and engages in a battle. When the battle ends in a draw, they realize they are both Guardians and immediately consider each other rivals. After a while, Master Beast appears and they are forced to combine their strength. A new character appear. It is a musician named Kaine, who uses a guitar Mysticker and forces Daichi to face his lack power to control Tamamayu. When Daichi lost control, Misora went and tried to protect Daichi's body from Kaine's attack and later, Kuroki with his mysticker, Necromancer, helped them to confront Kaine and his puppets. The Qilin Realm enters the Guardians HQ to find Daichi. The attack is led by Shuga of the Black Kakutan.
03	March 4, 2009	978-4-06-380032-6
07. The Shadow of Qilin Realm; 08. Training = Can Kicking; 09. Qilin Realm, On a Move!; 10. Despair gives Courage to a Coward
To hone their power as Blazers, Misora and Daichi start their training. In the shadows, the mysterious organization 'Kirinkai' has finally started making a move.
04	July 3, 2009	978-4-06-380056-2
11. The Pride of a Woman; 12. The Light That Pierces Through The Darkness; 13. Blazer Drive; 14. Returnable Place
05	November 4, 2009	978-4-06-380075-3
15. The Bond, Once Again; 16. The Dark Race; 17. The Fortune-teller; 18. The Ice Witch
06	March 4, 2010	978-4-06-380092-0
19. One Who Shines Forever; 20. Get Back!!; 21. Through Obscure Time; 22. The Invader
Murasaki Shikubu vs Misora. Conclusion of the ultimate fire and ice battle. In the new Section III HQ, a mysterious cyber attack, an unpredictable super computer battle begins.
07	2010	—
23. Light of Reality; 24. Blaze the Fomenting; 25. Hellfire; 26. Overture
08	November 11, 2010	978-4-06-380134-7
27. Breakthrough; 28. You and Me; 29. Kirinkai; 30. Half The World Away
09	March 4, 2011	978-4-06-380153-8
31. Necromancer; 32. Origin of Hatred; 33. Bond of the World; Final. New World
In a world that is breaking apart in front of Makiura's hatred, the strong bonds of Daichi and the others spins out the last hope.
