= List of O-Parts Hunter characters =

Several of the main characters as seen towards the end of the series. From left to right: Cross, Amidaba, Zero (back), Ruby, Jio, Ball with Jojo-maru, May, Jaja-maru and Kirin.

The O-Parts Hunter manga series, known as 666 Satan in Japan, features a cast of characters created by Seishi Kishimoto. Set in the near future, it tells the story of a teenage girl named Ruby Crescent who wants to become a treasure hunter, following in the footsteps of her father. Her objective is to find O-Parts, ancient relics that can only be used by O.P.T.s (O-Part Tacticians), people who are able to release their Spirit and focus it into an O-Part to activate a special Effect, usually of a fantastic nature. She meets a mysterious boy named Jio Freed who, due to having a dark, lonely past, seeks to conquer the world. Jio is hostile to her at first but ends up traveling with Ruby as her bodyguard.

Throughout the world, there are ten Angels and ten Demons with amazing powers, some of which are sealed within humans. They are being searched for by the Stea Government (Angels) and the Zenom Syndicate (Demons) who want to insert them within the Kabbalah and Reverse Kabbalah, that are found on the North and South Pole respectively. A legend tells that when either Kabbalah is filled, a super weapon called the Legendary O-Part will be awoken.

== Protagonists ==
=== Jio Freed ===
Jio Freed (ジオ・フリード, Jio Furīdo) is the thirteen-year-old protagonist with half-black, half-white hair, a very long red scarf and dreams of world domination. He has great battle skill, an obsession with money and is not quick to show his feelings, often hiding them or blaming other factors.^{[ch. 1]} He meets Ruby, a young treasure hunter, and agrees to become her bodyguard.^{[ch. 1]} Jio started his life without friends, being picked on and beaten by others. The people in his village forced him to leave after the death of his only friend's, Jin, parents for which he was blamed. He was trained in the wild by a wolf named Zero for a year, and draws fangs on his cheeks in tribute to his master, before being chased away to complete his dream of world domination.^{[ch. 5, 6]} After gaining Ruby and Ball as friends, and training under Kirin, Jio becomes more trustful of people and slowly breaks away from his dream of world domination, choosing to be more helpful and caring of others. This new outlook quickly gains more friends such as Mr. Wick and Mrs. Vercil, who he sees as his father and mother, never having known his real parents; Jio is emotionally crushed when they are killed by Kujaku in cold blood.^{[ch. 27]}

His main O-Part is a boomerang called Zero-shiki (零式, Rei-shiki; "Type Zero") (C rank) which doubles the energy it receives.^{[ch. 1]} He named it after his master Zero.^{[ch. 6]} After being repaired by Kirin, it is upgraded to the three-winged New Zero-shiki (零式改, Rei-shiki Aratame) (B rank), which triples the power.^{[ch. 21]} Jio is the container of Demon No. 1i, Satan (サタン), and seems unaware of Satan's existence, not knowing why the people in the village hated him. But during Jio's second fight with Wise Yury, Satan informs Jio that his body, "the vessel", is ready and grants him the "Number of the Beast" (ナンバーオブビースト, Nanbā obu Bīsuto). Appearing on the palm of Jio's left hand and reading the number 666, it is an O-Part with the Effect of Energy Absorption.^{[ch. 22]} While the mark allows Jio to absorb and use another O.P.T. or Demon's ability,^{[ch. 24]} it also gives more and more control of his body to Satan.

During their fight on Rock Bird, Satan and Jio take a fatal wound from Cross and Metatron. In order to survive, Satan absorbs Ruby's soul into Jio.^{[ch. 52]} Ruby stays inside of Jio to protect him against Satan's control, and he is separated from his friends during the fall of Rock Bird.^{[ch. 53]} Four years later, Jio has become the leader of the Cyclopian village and his O-Part has again been updated, this time to New Zero-shiki R (零式改R, Rei-shiki Aratame Āru), another boomerang-type weapon that reacts to the amount of hatred in one's heart and changes shape and size accordingly.^{[ch. 55]} Jio is discovered by Ball and rejoins his group to rescue Ruby from Stea Government HQ.^{[ch. 56]} After reuniting with Ruby, the Orphan crew then head for Zenom Syndicate HQ where Jio ultimately defeats Amaterasu Miko, who has initiated Armageddon. It is then revealed that all of the Angels and Demons, and Shin came from a planet called Eden, where 72 scientists tried to harness all the energy of the universe.^{[ch. 76]} To accomplish this task, they created the two Kabballahs and Shin, which have the power to absorb energy in the form of information. 20 scientists were in charge of categories of information and eventually evolved into the 20 Angels and Demons based on their category. The scientist that became Satan desired all of the energy for himself and began absorbing everything, but researchers Adam and Eve foresaw this and created a different device called Freedom. When he entered this program, Satan became trapped inside it; Jio Freed.^{[ch. 76]} Jio finally defeats the Satan inside him and gains control of Shin, which he warps to an uninhabited planet.

=== Ruby Crescent ===
Ruby Crescent (ルビィ・クレセント, Rubii Kuresento) is a treasure hunter who is researching the Legendary O-Part like her father, Zect Crescent.^{[ch. 1]} After bumping into Jio, she hires him as her bodyguard and they begin traveling together.^{[ch. 1]} Despite being only fifteen, Ruby has extensive knowledge of ancient languages.^{[ch. 25]} She smiles almost constantly, saying that after her father died, she realized that crying and running away will not solve anything.^{[ch. 1]} She always worries about Jio and Ball, especially when they are fighting against other O.P.T.s. Ruby shares a strong friendship with the two boys, but seems to have more intimate feelings for Jio. She carries a Jade Pendant necklace that her father gave her,^{[ch. 1]} which is revealed to be the S rank O-Part Key of Solomon (ソロモンの鍵, Soromon no Kagi) with over 100 Effects.^{[ch. 11]} Proximity to this Key of Solomon is what awakens an Angel in its host.^{[ch. 52]}

It is revealed that Ruby is Angel No. 10, Sandalphon (サンダルフォン, Sandarufon), who Zect stole along with the Key of Solomon while leaving the Stea Government.^{[ch. 52]} Her soul is absorbed into Jio by Satan during Jio's fight with Cross, in order to save him from a fatal wound.^{[ch. 52]} Four years later, Jio and his friends fight their way into Stea main base, where Jio is able to free Ruby's soul and return it to her body.^{[ch. 61]} She is now able to use her Angel powers, which include the ability to shrink and grow any object, and alter their design to some degree.^{[ch. 62, 70]} At Zenom HQ, Ruby is finally reunited with her father, who claims to have no daughter. But when Shin begins collecting all of the Demons and Angels, Ruby takes the attack for Zect and he regains memory of his daughter.^{[ch. 74, 75]} Both are absorbed by Shin and inserted into the Kaballah. But after Jio stops Armageddon, all three are seen with Cross and Zero before warping away from Earth on Shin.^{[ch. 76]}

=== Ball ===
Ball (ボール, Bōru) is a thirteen-year-old boy with dreadlocks living in the Stea Government-oppressed Entotsu City with his ill parents and younger sister. A member of the city's resistance movement, he pretends to be an O.P.T. and has a love of round things.^{[ch. 8]} He is surprised when Kirin reveals to him that he actually is one and gives him the O-Part Cool Ball (クールボール, Kūru Bōru) (C rank).^{[ch. 15]} Its Effect, Magnetism, allows him to repel and attract the stone at high speeds. Cool Ball later gains the ability to magnetize anything it touches, metal or not.^{[ch. 42]} Like Jio, after training with Kirin Ball's reflexes, strength, and awareness were raised greatly. Ball has displayed a natural talent of handling his O-Part and displays amazing cunning and strategy, using his O-Part's magnetism effect to fool his opponents, often coming up with plans in the middle of battle. After helping save his city, he joins Jio and Ruby on their journey.^{[ch. 24]} Ball is often the pilot of the main characters' transportation vehicle, the O-Part called the Orphan (オーフェン, Ōfen).^{[ch. 28]} After the four year timeskip, he wields a new O-Part, called Tricky (トリッキー, Torikkī) (B rank), which are essentially four smaller versions of Cool Ball that resemble marbles.^{[ch. 54]} During their attack on Stea HQ, he and May end up fighting her older brother Tsubame, who afterwards, asks Ball to take care of May.^{[ch. 59]} Years after Armageddon was stopped, Ball and May have a son and a daughter that they named Jio and Ruby.^{[ch. 76]}

=== Cross Biancina ===
Cross Biancina (クロス・ビアンキーナ, Kurosu Biankīna) is the fourteen-year-old, religious commander-in-chief of the Stea Government's SS rank O-Part airship, Shin.^{[ch. 4]} He uses the government and Shin to frequent the frontlines of battle in order to increase his odds of finding and killing Satan.^{[ch. 6]} Before the series began, Cross lived alone with his younger sister, Lily (リリィ, Ririi), after their parents left. One day, Jio came to their village and Satan inside Jio decides to instill loneliness, hatred and vengeance in Cross by destroying the village and Lily in front of him.^{[ch. Justice]} Cross was recovered by the Stea Government as the only survivor and found out to be an O.P.T., later becoming the commander of Shin and beginning his search for Satan.^{[ch. Justice]} His O-Part is Justice (ジャスティス, Jasutisu), which consists of five rings each with their own Effect; thumb earth, index electric water, middle wind, ring finger force field, pinkie bomb.^{[ch. 51]} Despite them only being C rank, Cross's skill and mastery of them allows him to easily defeat enemies with higher ranked O-Parts.^{[ch. 4]} Cross is revealed to be Angel No. 1, Metatron (メタトロン, Metatoron), while Lily was a clone created by the Stea Government from the Key of Solomon and Angel No. 10, Sandalphon.^{[ch. 52]} He awakens as an Angel during his fight with Jio on Rock Bird, thanks to the close proximity to Ruby's Key of Solomon.^{[ch. 52]}

After the four year timeskip, Cross has left the Stea Government and is traveling with the rest of the Orphan Crew helping them look for Jio.^{[ch. 54]} Later, he reunites with Ponzu who has purposely become the Demon Lilith, in order to become closer to Cross, whom she has feelings for. He is absorbed by Shin and inserted into the Kaballah. But after Jio stops Armageddon, Cross, Jio, Ruby, Zect and Zero are seen warping away from Earth on Shin.^{[ch. 76]}

=== Kirin ===
Kirin (キリン) is a white-haired, pickle-loving hermit who is easily bored and lives on the outskirts of Entotsu City. He is a licensed O-Part appraiser famed for his knowledge and repair of O-Parts, as well as his genius as a swordsman with his sword Shunkashuto (瞬花終刀, Shunkashūtō).^{[ch. 11, 16]} Despite his genius, Kirin is not an O.P.T., but his abilities exceed those of most O.P.T.s. A former Stea Government officer at the same time as Amidaba and Zect,^{[ch. 19]} he is now a hermit accompanied by his dog Jaja-maru. Jio and Ball seek him out to fix Jio's O-Part, but in exchange they have to keep him entertained playing games, which also act as training to be O.P.T.s.^{[ch. 15]} Kirin meets up with Jio, Ruby, and Ball again at the Dastom Ruins, where they encounter his twin brother Kujaku, before continuing to travel as a quartet.^{[ch. 27, 28]} After the four year timeskip, he is traveling with the rest of the Orphan Crew looking for Jio.^{[ch. 54]} During their attack on Stea HQ, Kirin and Amidaba fight and kill Dofwa Longinus.^{[ch. 58]}

Kirin and Kujaku are the twin sons of a Cyclopian father and an O.P.T. mother, and the nephews of May's grandfather.^{[ch. 55]} While Kirin is special in that his Cyclopian third eye was open when he was born, very rare, if not completely unheard of, Kujaku does not a have a third eye, but is an O.P.T.^{[ch. 55]} At one point, Kirin attempted to stab his third eye in order to be normal and stop his jealous brother's hate toward him and his father, but the third eye can not be destroyed. So he cut his left eye out, blinding it, and leaving him with two working eyes: his right eye and his Cyclopian one.^{[ch. 68]} Inside the Zenom base Kirin fights and defeats Kujaku with the help of May. After the battle Kirin gives Kujaku their father's sword, revealing that their father had intended for him to inherit the sword the whole time.^{[ch. 68]}

=== Amidaba ===
Amidaba (アミダバ), nicknamed "Seven-Colored Amidaba" (七色のアミダバ, Nanairo no Amidaba),^{[ch. 22]} is a skilled O.P.T. able to use any O-Part.^{[ch. 44]} She was a Stea Government army officer alongside Zect Crescent and the one who found Ruby's Jade Pendant.^{[ch. 11]} Amidaba meets Ruby when they are both locked up in the dungeons of Entotsu City and helps her escape. She reappears at Rock Bird investigating Olympia and Ikaros.^{[ch. 44]} There she uses Mars' O-Part, Magic Book (マジックブック, Majikku Bukku), which materializes anything drawn in it.^{[ch. 53]} After the four year timeskip, she is traveling with the rest of the Orphan Crew looking for Jio.^{[ch. 54]} During their attack on Stea HQ, she and Kirin fight and kill Dofwa.^{[ch. 58]} Her own O-Part is Rainbow (レインボー, Reinbō), seven tattoos on her palms, which each have different Effects, her favorite being gravity control.^{[ch. 57]}

=== Jin ===
Jin (ジン) is Jio's former childhood friend who protected Jio when he was bullied by other kids. The same day that Jin told Jio they were friends, he witnessed his parents being killed by Jio in Satan form.^{[ch. 3]} Jin became extremely hateful toward Jio and wants to kill him. After becoming an O.P.T. for hire, he meets Jio on a mission. During their fight, Satan awakens and claims credit for the murder of Jin's parents. When Jin realizes Jio has no memory of Satan's actions, he forgives Jio and saves him from a fire Satan started, while he himself seemingly falls to his death.^{[ch. 3]} His O-Part is Ashura (阿修羅) (B rank) and its Effect is Flame, but his Spirit, fueled by his hatred of Jio, turns the flames black and keep burning until an object is reduced to ashes.^{[ch. 3]} Jin returns as a contestant in the Olympia tournament. He no longer hates Jio and is instead focused on saving Jio from Satan, thus the black flames of Ashura have been replaced by more powerful blue flames.^{[ch. 39, 40]} Jin escapes Rock Bird with Futomomo-taro, and the two are still traveling together four years later.^{[ch. 53, 62]} They accidentally end up in Zenom HQ at the same time as Jio and company.^{[ch. 64]} Jin and Zero team up to defeat Astaroth.

=== Zero ===
Zero (ゼロ) is a lone wolf who was banished from his pack along with his father because of their powers.^{[ch. 5]} After saving Jio in the desert, he taught the boy fighting and survival skills. Zero hates both humans and wolves, but bonds with Jio as they share similar situations of being shunned by others of their species. His bones are C Rank O-Parts, and their Effect is high-speed movement, but using them causes extreme pain to Zero. After a year, Zero chased Jio away so that the boy can follow his dreams.^{[ch. 6]} Zero finds and saves Jio after the collapse of Rock Bird and is living with him in the Cyclopian village after the four year timeskip.^{[ch. 55]} He joins the Orphan Crew when Jio reunites with them. Zero fights Rock and Astaroth alongside Jio and Jin, where it is revealed that he is Angel No. 4, Zadkiel (サドキエル, Zadokieru), having inherited it from his father.^{[ch. 71]} His special ability allows his body doubles to take the place of someone else and save them from an attack. The sacrificial wolf will die in their place, but the person will still feel the pain of the attack.^{[ch. 71]} He is absorbed by Shin and inserted into the Kaballah. But after Jio stops Armageddon, Zero, Jio, Ruby, Cross and Zect are seen warping away from Earth on Shin.^{[ch. 76]}

=== May ===
May (メイ, Mei) is a young female member of the Cyclopians and granddaughter of the village chief. She met Jio during the four year timeskip when he was nursed back to health by her village, and has developed a huge crush on him.^{[ch. 55]} After sneaking onboard to be with Jio, she joins the Orphan Crew.^{[ch. 56]} During their attack on Stea HQ, she and Ball end up fighting her older brother Tsubame. During the fight, May unlocks the power of her third eye and with Ball's help is able to defeat her brother.^{[ch. 59]} She realizes that she used Jio as a replacement for losing her brother, and now shows affection for Ball.^{[ch. 61, 64]} Inside the Zenom base she, Kirin, and Jajamaru fight against Kujaku. It is with help from her third eye, that Kirin is able to deliver the final blow.^{[ch. 68]} Years after Armageddon was stopped, Ball and May have a son and a daughter that they named Jio and Ruby.^{[ch. 76]}

=== Futomomo-taro ===
Futomomo-taro (ふともも太郎, Futomomotarō) is a fat man that enters the Olympia tournament. Although he fails the preliminary round, due to an error he stays on Rock Bird and later escapes with Jin.^{[ch. 33, 53]} His O-Part is the Sardine Sword (with Sesame) (ママカリの剣（ゴマ付き）, Mamakari no Ken (Goma-tsuki)), which paralyzes the people it cuts with its stench and was the idea of Papuwa of the South Seas and Jibaku-kun author Ami Shibata.^{[ch. 31, 34]} He also uses the Dog, Monkey and Pheasant Millet Dumplings (犬・猿・キジ・きび団子, Inu Saru Kijiki Kibi Dango), which give him an animal trait depending on the one he eats; keen sense of smell from the Dog dumpling, wings from the Pheasant one.^{[ch. 34]} Four years after Rock Bird, Futomomo-taro and Jin are still traveling together and accidentally end up in Zenom HQ at the same time as Jio and company.^{[ch. 64]} After accidentally saving her, Futomomo-taro becomes the "master" of Spica.^{[ch. 70]} Futomomo-taro is based on the folktale hero Momotarō.

=== Jaja-maru ===
Jaja-maru (ジャジャ丸) is the small, round, shoe-wearing pet dog of Kirin. He is an O.P.T. whose O-Part, a wolf bone, gives him high-speed movement.^{[ch. 14]} He is also able to drive the Orphan. After the four year timeskip, he has grown into an enormous saber tooth tiger-like animal and has a son, Jojo-maru.^{[ch. 56]}

=== Jojo-maru ===
Jojo-maru (ジョジョ丸) is Jaja-maru's son, who looks exactly like his dad did.^{[ch. 56]} He is also an O.P.T. and able to fly the Orphan. He's always been seen on or near Ball and has taken his father's place as the comical relief, being a living afro puff, yet also being helpful in a battle such as being the one to show Ball the way to defeat Franken.^{[ch. 68]}

== Stea Government ==
=== Amaterasu Miko ===
Amaterasu Miko (アマテラス・ミコ), nicknamed "The Phantom" (幻, Maboroshi), is the leader of the Stea Government (ステア政府, Sutea Seifu).^{[ch. 30]} She desires to destroy the material world and create a new, conflictless world "where the consciousness of all" are united as one.^{[ch. 60]} She is immortal, having transferred her mind to the O-Part ship Shin, with her body being a machine.^{[ch. 60, 61]} During the attack on Stea HQ, Miko acquires Jio's half of the Legendary O-Part and then uses Shin to take over the body of Balsa to form a group composed of those on board, including Ponzu.^{[ch. 62, 73]} Attaching some of her psyche to Ponzu, she takes over the body of Baku and steals the second half of the Legendary O-Part. Upon joining the two halves of the Legendary O-Part, the Kaballah and Reverse Kaballah merge to form the true core of Shin.^{[ch. 74]} She proceeds to absorb all of the Angels and Demons sans Jio/Satan and starts to absorb all life (information and memory) on the planet, aiming to achieve her goal of unifying all consciousness. However, while attempting to absorb Jio, Miko's main spiritual body is destroyed by Jio's Zero-shiki R.^{[ch. 75]}

=== Dofwa Longinus ===
Dofwa Longinus (ドワフ・ロンギヌス, Dowafu Ronginusu) is a blind man and the Stea Government's chief of staff.^{[ch. 30]} Nicknamed "Cross-Scarred Dofwa" (十字キズのドワフ・ロンギヌス, Jūji Kizu no Dowafu Ronginusu), after the shape of the scar covering his eyes, he is the former commander of the attack force.^{[ch. 57]} His O-Part is Red Spear (レッドスピア, Reddo Supia), a spear able to thrust faster than the speed of sound, creating a sonic boom, and which controls light. Dofwa is sent by Miko to stop Jio and friends from advancing into their base, but is killed by Kirin with Amidaba's help.^{[ch. 58]}

=== Mishima Kagehisa ===
Mishima Kagehisa (三島 影久) is a lieutenant general in the Stea Government Army and their chief strategic officer of the Northern Hemisphere.^{[ch. 28]} He is in charge of their operations at the North Pole, which mainly consists of research surrounding the Kaballah and the Angels, and is privy to information about them that even Dofwa is not.^{[ch. 37]} He claims the Stea Government's goal is to unite the world as one, but must do so using force led by O.P.T.s.^{[ch. 25]} Mishima is a cyborg with mechanical body parts, including a positron gun O-Part in his left arm.^{[ch. 61]} He becomes disillusioned with Miko's plan, and helps Jio and company free Ruby's body from her containment chamber.^{[ch. 61]}

=== Ponzu ===
Ponzu (ぽんず) is a legendary hacker, nicknamed "Invisible" (インビジブル, Inbijiburu), whose skills the Stea Government values enough to cut a deal with and house the wanted criminal in secret.^{[ch. 30]} She wears a skimpy outfit with a built-in computer, a hat with cat ears and a tail that acts as a local area network cable.^{[ch. 30]} Cross seeks her out for detailed information on Satan and she accompanies him back to Shin to answer his questions. Post time-skip finds Ponzu still on the Shin under the command of Miko, with Demon No. 9i, Lilith (リリス, Ririsu), implanted into her body.^{[ch. 64]} Lilith has the ability to cause others to go berserk when they look into her eyes and can cause molecular instability, preventing even Angels from regenerating.^{[ch. 70]} The core of Lilith is pulled out of Ponzu by Cross during her fight with him and Ruby, and it is revealed that she purposely became the Demon in order to become as close to Cross as possible.^{[ch. 70]} She then joins up with him and becomes one of the Crew of the Orphan before being absorbed into Shin and inserted into the Kabbalah with all the other Demons and Angels.^{[ch. 75]}

=== Michael ===
Michael (ミカエル, Mikaeru) is the narcissistic No. 6 Angel who works for the Stea Government and is obsessed with beauty. A clone of Michael created by Mishima is sent to Olympia to capture any other Angels and kill any Demons.^{[ch. 37]} Although he defeats his opponent in the fourth match,^{[ch. 39]} the clone is later destroyed by Kujaku (Adramelech).^{[ch. 47]} Four years later, the real Michael is sent to stop Jio and company from advancing into Stea HQ, and ends up fighting Jio and Cross simultaneously.^{[ch. 58]} In his true form, an enormous sphere, anything he touches is "purified" to its natural base elements.^{[ch. 59]} Michael is destroyed by Cross, with its remains returning to the Kabbalah.^{[ch. 60]}

=== Tsubame ===
Tsubame (つばめ) is May's older brother, and the former leader of the Cyclopian village. He is sent to stop Jio and company from advancing into Stea HQ, and ends up fighting his sister and Ball. Three years earlier, he fell off a cliff while fighting against Zenom operatives alongside Jio and was taken for dead. He was rescued by Mishima,^{[ch. 59]} who helped him open his Cyclopian third eye and used him in experiments crossing different races in order to create an enhanced O.P.T.^{[ch. 56]} Tsubame's third eye allows him to program any object he sees for a few seconds, excluding humans.^{[ch. 58]} The experiments seem to have driven him mad enough to attack his own sister. May's newly opened third eye and their shared gesture help him remember who he is and close his third eye. He apologizes to his sister and asks Ball to take care of her, before crumbling into dust.^{[ch. 59]}

=== Balsa ===
Balsa (バルサ, Barusa) is the vice-commander of the airship Shin, under Cross.^{[ch. 4]} Although he acts respectful, he evidently despises Cross and thinks he would be better suited to command Shin. During the Rock Bird arc, he even fires Shin's soul-absorbing laser at the city, not caring whether or not Cross will survive. After Cross defected from Stea post timeskip, Balsa took his place as commander of Shin and declared it an independent state called Zipan (ジパン, Jipan).^{[ch. 61]} After Miko abandons Stea, she takes over Balsa's body and uses it to still maintain control of those on board Shin without revealing her nature as Shin itself.^{[ch. 62]}

== Zenom Syndicate ==
=== Zect Crescent ===
Zect Crescent (ゼクト・クレセント, Zekuto Kuresento), also known as Zenom (ゼノム, Zenomu), is the leader of the Zenom Syndicate (ゼノム組織, Zenomu Soshiki). He is the former captain of the Stea Government's first attack squad, where he was nicknamed the "Red Wind".^{[ch. 52]} Zect betrayed the Stea Government, stealing Ruby and the Key of Solomon,^{[ch. 52]} and became a treasure hunter to track down the Legendary O-Part. He created the Zenom Syndicate in order to bring down the Stea Government.^{[ch. 54]} After the four year timeskip, he is shown to have one half of the Legendary O-Part. Zect has both Demon No. 5i, Asmodeus (アスモデウス, Asumodeusu), and Demon No. 6i, Belphegor (ベルフェゴール, Berufegōru), within him.^{[ch. 73]} Using the Demons' powers, he created the O-Parts used by his Zenom subordinates and can therefore use all of their Effects. Zect can also combine the powers of both Demons for attacks. It is revealed that Zect had a wife and daughter who were killed in an O-Part war, which set him out to change the world.^{[ch. 75]} He placed Belphegor inside himself in order to steal Sandalphon from Stea and named her Ruby after his daughter. But fearing the Demon in him would hurt his Angel daughter, Zect left Ruby.^{[ch. 75]} He is absorbed by Shin and inserted into the Reverse Kaballah. But after Jio stops Armageddon, Zect, Jio, Ruby, Cross and Zero are seen warping away from Earth on Shin.^{[ch. 76]}

=== Kujaku ===
Kujaku (孔雀) is one of the Big Four of the Zenom Syndicate and the twin brother of Kirin.^{[ch. 27]} In charge of the Reverse Kabbalah project at the South Pole, he is searching for the Demons and is Wise Yury and Shuri's superior. Baku says that Kujaku wants to brush aside the other members of the Big Four and become leader of Zenom.^{[ch. 34]} He goes to Rock Bird to capture Lucifuge and kill Shuri, who failed at the task.^{[ch. 43]} Kujaku is Demon No. 8i, Adramelech (アドラマレク, Adoramareku), with the greatest disintegration abilities amongst the Demons, that affect anything within range of its flashes of light.^{[ch. 51]} It also has the ability to reconstruct and can move through physical matter. Kujaku is an O.P.T. but is never seen using an O-part, as he usually relies on his Demon powers instead. He and his brother were trained to be swordsmen by their father, but Kujaku could never win against Kirin due to his brother having the Cyclopian third eye while he does not, leading to intense jealously.^{[ch. 67]} One day he found an orb containing Adramelech and the Demon took over his right arm, giving him raw power. Although he was now able to beat Kirin, their father scolds Kujaku for his new disregard of technique, leading to Kujaku killing his father.^{[ch. 67]}

After the four year timeskip, Kujaku fights Kirin and May and activates his full Demon form. Thanks to May's help, Kirin is able to cut Adramelech to pieces, separating it from Kujaku.^{[ch. 68]} Kirin then gives Kujaku their father's sword, explaining that it was always intended to belong to him, the superior swordsman, this being why their father pushed Kujaku so hard. After seeing his name carved on the sword, Kujaku sheds tears realizing that his father was not ignoring him.^{[ch. 68]} Later as the non-Angel and Demon members of the Orphan crew are being absorbed by Miko and Shin, Kujaku uses the sword to perform the ultimate technique their father taught them to save them, before dying on his feet smiling.^{[ch. 75]}

=== Rock ===
Rock (ロック, Rokku) is one of the Big Four of the Zenom Syndicate. He distrusts Kujaku and is aware of Kujaku's ambition to take control of Zenom. He is Angel No. 5, Samael (サマエル, Samaeru), and as a result has the ability to remove collected Demons from the Reverse Kabbalah.^{[ch. 66]} Rock was formerly in the Stea Government, but after learning that what he believed to have been a mission to suppress an uprising, was actually simply to acquire an "O-Part" and eliminate anyone who knew about it, he left them. Not before taking this "O-Part", which turned out to be Samael, who took over his right eye.^{[ch. 72]} In normal combat he dual wields two pistols with the Effect Kerberos, which simply greatly enhances their firepower. He also carries the O-Part 12 Watchers (12の監視(トゥエルプウォッチャー), Tuerupu Wotchā) on his back, which are twelve pyramid-shaped pieces he controls that each emit laser beams and can intensify their power when combined into certain formations. He fights Jio, Jin and Zero alongside Demon No. 4i, Astaroth (アシュタロト, Ashutaroto), who can temporarily turn things into others; such as water into fire.^{[ch. 71]} In Samael's true form, he can read minds and tell how much power someone has left. Rock is defeated when Jio tricks him using his own ability and takes the core of Samael out of him.^{[ch. 72]}

=== Spica ===
Spica (スピカ, Supika) is one of the Big Four of the Zenom Syndicate. She is quiet and very polite and acts like a maid, greeting even enemies as "masters" and "ladies" and claiming she will serve them until death.^{[ch. 69]} When she holds the ring O-Part Fairing (フェアリング, Fearingu), which is worn around her neck like a necklace, to her mouth, her personality changes completely as she angrily yells at them. The ring takes any words or sounds spoken into it and materializes large letters spelling out the words or sounds. These letters take on the characteristics of the word(s), such as "thorns" creating thorny letters and "hot tea" creating letters in hot liquid.^{[ch. 69]} During her fight with Ruby she is caught between two halves of a rock, but is accidentally saved by Futomomo-taro. Because he is the only person to ever become her "master" without her having to ask, Spica vows to serve him until death and betrays Zenom.^{[ch. 70]}

=== Franken Schretz ===
Franken Schretz (フランケン・シュレッツ, Furanken Shurettsu) is one of the Big Four of the Zenom Syndicate and looks like a beetle-esque robot with a large mask-like head. Franken is used by Zenom to hold, transport and inject the Demons into the Reverse Kabbalah. It is revealed that the robot body is made up of O-Parts and the human brain inside is the O.P.T. controlling it. Franken was a terminally ill child until his father, Professor Browny Schretz (ブラウニー・シュレッツ, Buraunī Shurettsu), artificially turned him into an O.P.T.^{[ch. 69]} Franken is able to spin very rapidly, destroying objects, and shoot masks out of his mouth that fit onto people's faces and take control of their body. He also keeps a number of masks that allow him to change Effects when worn, such as fire and ice.^{[ch. 69]} After he is defeated by Ball, Professor Browny kills Franken's brain, explaining that it had already reached its limit, before killing himself too.^{[ch. 69]}

=== Baku ===
Baku (バク) is a high-ranking member of the Zenom Syndicate and Zect's most loyal subordinate.^{[ch. 27]} Baku seems to know a great deal about the nature of the Kaballah. He states that Zenom's goal is to bring chaos and destruction to the corrupt world using the Reverse Kaballah.^{[ch. 26]} His O-Part is the Mask of Magima (マギマの仮面, Magima no Kamen) which grants him telepathy and, when used with the two other masks possessed by his son Mu and daughter Lem, teleportation.^{[ch. 11, 26]} During Jio's battle with Zect Crescent, Baku is possessed by Miko in order to steal the other half of the Legendary O-Part.^{[ch. 74]}

=== Shuri ===
Shuri (シュリ) is a high-ranking member of the Zenom Syndicate and aide to Kujaku.^{[ch. 27]} As a child he watched his parents be murdered by Stea Government soldiers during a war and was recruited by Zect into Zenom to overthrow the government and get his revenge.^{[ch. 40, 41]} His O-Part is Wraith (レイス, Reisu), sharpened chains he can control with frost Effects, that were found at the scene of his parents' death.^{[ch. 40]} He used to believe that only material things exist, and that things such as feelings and heart were not real, and he froze his parents' bodies in ice as proof of their existence. Shuri enters the Olympia tournament on orders from Kujaku to confirm/learn the identities of any Demons there.^{[ch. 34]} He faces Jin in the fifth match, which he loses because his O-Part is broken.^{[ch. 41]} But during the match, Shuri sees the error of his ways and with Kujaku trying to kill him, Shuri leaves Zenom. After the four year timeskip, his O-Part has been repaired and he helps Kite save Yuria from Zenom.^{[ch. 62, 66]}

=== Wise Yury ===
Wise Yury (ワイズ・ユーリィ, Waizu Yūrii), nicknamed the "Crimson Magician" (深紅の奇術師, Shinku no Kijutsushi), is a low-ranking official of the Zenom Syndicate.^{[ch. 27]} He is paid by Entotsu City's governor to terrorize the city and flee when the Stea Government arrives in order to make the people trust them.^{[ch. 8]} However, he is actually waiting for the excavation of the S Rank O-Part Mexis, to use the governor as energy.^{[ch. 19]} Wise has a tendency to kill people without hesitation, even fellow members of Zenom Syndicate, and gets a piercing on his tongue for every person he kills.^{[ch. 9]} His O-Part is two rings called Brother (ブラザー, Burazā), they each have individual Effects that work in tandem: Handling and Transportation of Matter.^{[ch. 9]} He can put his hand through one ring and have it come out of the other. He uses it to break Jio's Zero-shiki in their first encounter, forcing the boy to flee.^{[ch. 10]} After Mexis is excavated, Wise uses it to fight Jio, but is defeated and then absorbed by Mexis.^{[ch. 24]}

=== Museshi ===
Museshi (ムセシ) is a troop captain of the Zenom Syndicate.^{[ch. 27]} He is one of the agents who attacks citizens of Entotsu City while Mexis is destroying the city. He kills another Zenom member in order to fight Ball, in the latter's first fight after becoming an O.P.T.^{[ch. 18]} Ball struggles at first, until he exploits Museshi's severe acrophobia. Museshi always bends down and walks on all fours because he thinks the distance between him and the ground is too far when he stands up.^{[ch. 18]} His O-Part is Hang and Tooth Hang (ハングとトゥースハング, Hangu to Tūsu Hangu), claws on all four limbs and fangs which alter physical matter; they can extend and retract in size, as well as change direction.

== Other characters ==
=== Yuria ===
Yuria (ユリア) is a short teenage girl who wears a cape and enters the Olympia with Kite in hopes that the prize, the Legendary O-Part, can cure her. Although she fails the preliminary round, she is brought back in order to have ten contestants in the actual tournament.^{[ch. 33]} Yuria tries to avoid using her "O-Part" at all costs because it is actually Demon No. 3i, Lucifuge (ルキフグス, Rukifugusu), and she can not control it.^{[ch. 38]} Nine years earlier, she followed Kite and his father into some ruins and touched Lucifuge, which took over her left arm before "disappearing" the ruins and Kite's father.^{[ch. 38]} Lucifuge can travel to another dimension and "reject" anything to that dimension as well.^{[ch. 38]} In her fight with Python Jack, she is forced to unleash Lucifuge to win and the Demon is about to rampage the arena until Yuria's love of Kite subdues it.^{[ch. 38]} Later, with Kite's life threatened by Kujaku, Yuria willingly surrenders to Kujaku and is put into the Reverse Kabbalah.^{[ch. 48]} Four years later, Kite's love for Yuria chases the newly freed Lucifuge out of her, and the two are reunited while Lucifuge is again absorbed by the Reverse Kabbalah.^{[ch. 66]}

=== Kite ===
Kite (カイト, Kaito) is a young man who enters the Olympia with Yuria to find a way to cure her. He fights Ball in the second match, and although both are knocked unconscious, Kite loses because his O-Part is destroyed.^{[ch. 36]} His first O-Part is The Giant's Knife (巨人のナイフ, Kyojin no Naifu), a huge knife the weight of which Kite can alter from grams to tons.^{[ch. 36]} During the four year timeskip, Kite teams up with Shuri and the two plan to rescue Yuria and destroy Zenom.^{[ch. 62]} He now uses Heavy Metal (ヘビーメタル, Hebī Metaru), a glove that becomes a suit of armor, the weight of which he can change at will. At the South Pole, Kite allows Lucifuge to send him to the other dimension, but his love for Yuria breaks him out of it and chases the Demon out of her, reuniting the two.^{[ch. 66]}

=== Anna ===
Anna (アンナ) is a beautiful woman with large breasts who enters the Olympia. She tries to win at any cost in order to reunite with Mars (マルス, Marusu; alternately "Malse"), the man she loved and who won the Olympia tournament four years prior but never returned.^{[ch. 35]} Anna actually defeats Jio during the preliminary round, but he is brought back in order to have ten contestants in the actual tournament.^{[ch. 33]} The two fight again in the first match of the tournament where she loses, but Jio promises to win and find out what happened to Mars.^{[ch. 35]} Her O-Part is the cloth Tennyo (天女), which can harden into various objects, such as a spear or shield.^{[ch. 35]}

=== Python Jack ===
Python Jack (パイソン・ジャック, Paison Jakku) is a man wrapped in bandages like a mummy who enters the Olympia. He fights using Viraia (ビライヤ, Biraiya), a living O-Part that possesses high speed movement and acid attacks, but occasionally tries to kill its user.^{[ch. 37]} Python is a serial killer who murders anyone he meets just for fun, but he was not always like this. Previously he was a regular O.P.T. called on by his village to move the newly unearthed Viraia, but was deformed by its acid. The rest of the village turned on him, treating him like a monster, so he decided to become "a real monster."^{[ch. 37]} He fights Yuria in the third match and is about to win, forcing Yuria to unleash Lucifuge. Python is eaten and sent to another dimension by the Demon.^{[ch. 38]}

=== Ikaros ===
Ikaros (イカロス, Ikarosu) is the leader of the floating city Rock Bird (ロックバード, Rokku Bādo), which is an O-Part. Every four years he holds the Olympia (オリンピア, Orinpia) tournament where O.P.T.s from the surface are brought to compete.^{[ch. 31]} Although he secretly uses the winning O.P.T. as a "battery" to power the flying city,^{[ch. 44]} Amidaba suggests that Ikaros is afraid of O.P.T.s and uses them to learn about the Legendary O-Part.^{[ch. 46]} Ikaros is Demon No. 2i, Beelzebub (ベルゼブブ, Beruzebubu). His body is made of maggots, which allows him to regenerate limbs, and if touched, they will devour the other person from the inside out.^{[ch. 47]} Ikaros kidnaps Ruby in order to make Jio give in completely to Satan, in hopes of using Satan as his own weapon.^{[ch. 43, 44]} Beelzebub's actual body is the gigantic underlying structure for Rock Bird.^{[ch. 49]} Jio absorbs Spirit from all the remaining O.P.T.s on Rock Bird for a final attack to destroy Ikaros, causing the city to crumble. But Franken Schretz, Rock and Spica take what remains of Beelzebub's head and insert it into the Reverse Kabbalah.^{[ch. 51]}

=== Cyclopians ===
The Cyclopians (サイクロプス人, Saikuropusu Hito) are humanoids, and the original inhabitants of the planet. Unlike Cyclops in ancient Greek mythology, Cyclopians have two normal eyes, and a mark on their forehead. The mark will only open into a third eye for a few Cyclopians and grants them incredible abilities.^{[ch. 55]} Normal humans are descendants of space travelers called Noah, that used the Kabbalah to destroy the Cyclopians.^{[ch. 55]} The small number of surviving Cyclopians have stayed hidden in their village ever since, and held onto one half of the Legendary O-Part.^{[ch. 55]} Due to the Zenom Syndicate closing in on them, the village chief entrusts this half to Jio, who has become their village leader.^{[ch. 55]}
