= Crunchyroll Manga =

Online manga platform and smartphone app

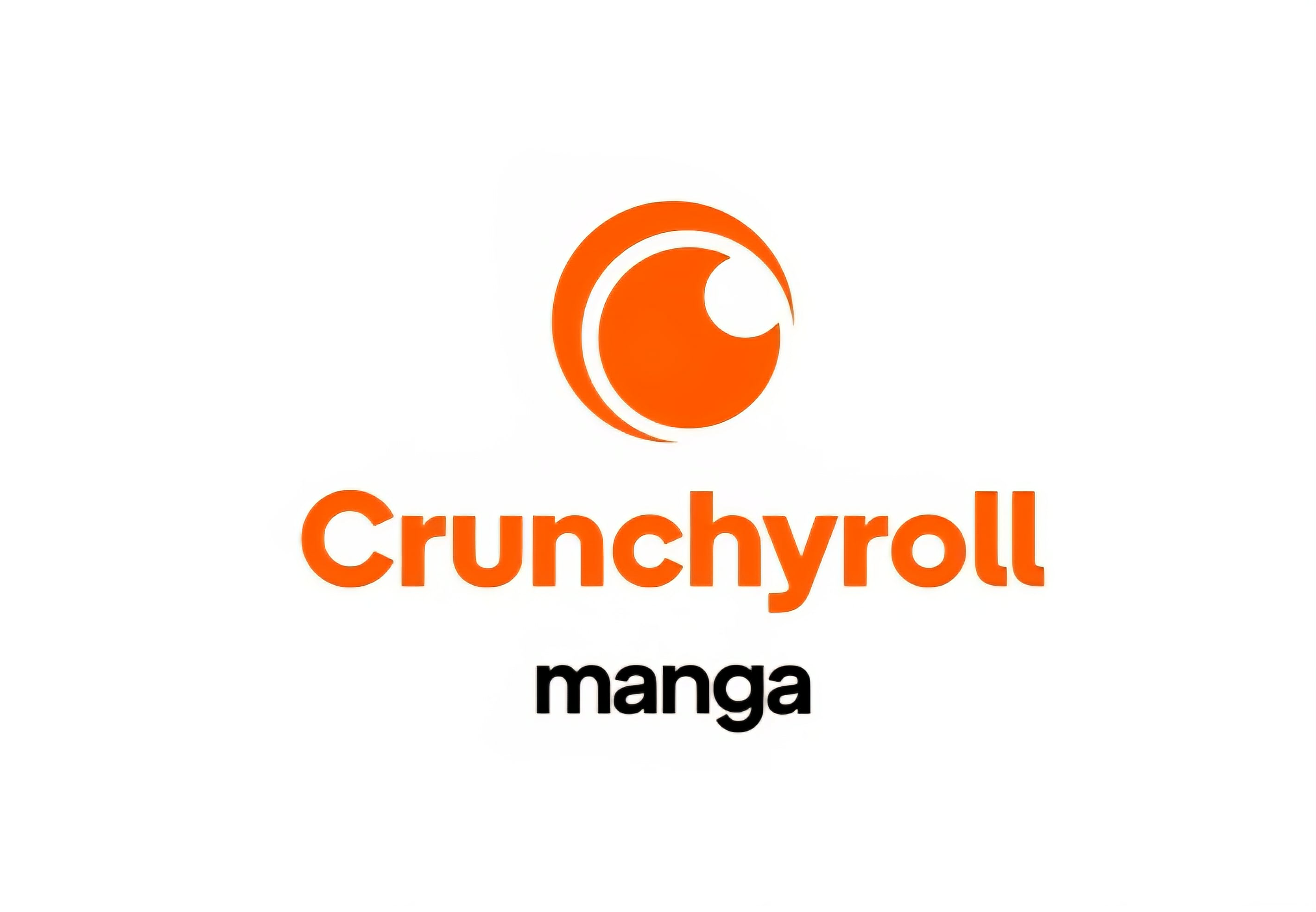
- Website type: Digital manga
- Available in: 1 languages
- List of languages: English
- Dissolved: December 11, 2023; 2 years ago (original)
- Headquarters: San Francisco, California, U.S.
- Country of origin: United States
- Area served: United States and Canada
- Industry: Manga
- Products: Manga; Digital distribution
- Parent: Crunchyroll, LLC
- Website: crunchyroll.com/manga
- Commercial: Yes
- Registration: Required
- Launched: October 30, 2013; 13 years ago (original); October 9, 2025; 13 months ago (current form)
- Current status: Active

Crunchyroll Manga is a digital manga subscription service from Crunchyroll, LLC offering officially licensed manga to readers in the United States and Canada via an ad-free mobile app on iOS and Android. The service's current iteration launched on October 9, 2025, significantly expanding upon its original form, which began distribution on October 30, 2013. Crunchyroll Manga includes titles from numerous leading publishers on its platform, such as Square Enix, VIZ Media, Shueisha and J-Novel Club, and Yen Press.

== History ==
=== Crunchyroll Manga (2013–2023) ===
The original Crunchyroll Manga was a digital manga platform that was first launched on October 30, 2013, and initially had a lineup of twelve titles, with chapters released simultaneously with their Japanese release. The Crunchyroll Manga service provided English speaking readers with officially licensed editions of the latest installments of popular manga published by Futabasha, Kodansha, Kadokawa Shoten and Shōnen Gahōsha soon after they were released in Japan.

On October 26, 2013, Crunchyroll confirmed that the Crunchyroll Manga service would be released on October 30, 2013. The service became available in 170 countries, except Japan, China, France, Germany and Italy.

On February 17, 2018, Crunchyroll announced that Kodansha titles excluding Fairy Tail would be removed from the manga section of the site on March 1. The titles are still available for purchase as eBooks. On March 1, 2018, Crunchyroll announced that they would simultaneously publish new Kodansha manga titles as they release in Japan.

On November 10, 2023, Crunchyroll, LLC confirmed that Crunchyroll Manga would be shut down on December 11.

Manga chapters can be read online through the website or on web-enabled devices through Crunchyroll or an official app. Readers can sign up for an All-Access or Manga subscription for full access to several manga titles. Anime and Drama subscribers can read only the latest chapters with limited advertisements.

The anthology format generally mirrors that of the equivalent magazine issues, typically featuring the same cover illustrations, and color interior pages. If a physical copy or digital copy of a series is available for sale, it might not be available on Crunchyroll Manga.

==== Completed series (2013–2023) ====
Series that have completed their serialization in Crunchyroll Manga.

Title	Creator(s)	First issue	Last issue
Action Mask (Monthly Action)	Datto Nishiwaki	January 24, 2014 (Chapter #8)	Ongoing
As the Gods Will – The Second Series (Bessatsu Shōnen Magazine)	Muneyoshi Kaneshiro, Akeji Fujimura	October 30, 2013 (Chapter #40)	March 1, 2018
Attack on Titan (Bessatsu Shōnen Magazine)	Hajime Isayama	October 30, 2013 (Chapter #50)	March 1, 2018
Coppelion (Monthly Young Magazine)	Tomonori Inoue	October 30, 2013 (Chapter #205)	February 20, 2016 (Chapter #233)
Fairy Tail (Weekly Shōnen Magazine)	Hiro Mashima	October 30, 2013 (Chapter #376)	July 26, 2017 (Chapter #545)
Fort of Apocalypse (Monthly Shōnen Rival)	Yuu Kuraishi, Kazu Inabe	October 30, 2013 (Chapter #25)	March 1, 2018
The Heroic Legend of Arslan (Bessatsu Shōnen Magazine)	Yoshiki Tanaka, Hiromu Arakawa	April 8, 2014 (Chapter #9)	March 1, 2018
King's Game Origin (Monthly Action)	Nobuaki Kanazawa, J-ta Yamada	January 24, 2014 (Chapter #8)	January 25, 2016 (Chapter #30)
My Wife is Wagatsuma-san (Weekly Shōnen Magazine)	Yuu Kuraishi and Keishi Nishikida	October 30, 2013 (Chapter #67)	September 24, 2014 (Chapter #108)
Mysterious Girlfriend X (Monthly Afternoon)	Riichi Ueshiba	October 30, 2013 (Chapter #82)	September 25, 2014 (Chapter #92)
Orange (Bessatsu Margaret, Monthly Action)	Ichigo Takano	January 24, 2014 (Chapter #9)	August 25, 2015 (Chapter #22)
The Seven Deadly Sins (Weekly Shōnen Magazine)	Nakaba Suzuki	October 30, 2013 (Chapter #52)	March 1, 2018
Space Brothers (Weekly Morning)	Chūya Koyama	October 30, 2013 (Chapter #220)	March 1, 2018
A Town Where You Live (Weekly Shōnen Magazine)	Kōji Seo	October 30, 2013 (Chapter #233)	February 12, 2014 (Chapter #261)
UQ Holder! (Weekly Shōnen Magazine)	Ken Akamatsu	October 30, 2013 (Chapter #2)	March 1, 2018
Yamada-kun and the Seven Witches (Weekly Shōnen Magazine)	Miki Yoshikawa	October 30, 2013 (Chapter #84)	March 1, 2018

=== Crunchyroll Manga relaunch (since 2025) ===
On January 7, 2025, Crunchyroll announced during Sony Group Corporation's CES 2025 press conference that a new digital manga application would join the service as a premium add-on, launched later that year. The app launched as a standalone, called Crunchyroll Manga, on iOS and Android with web browser support planned for the future. The relaunched service first launched in English in the United States and Canada, with other language options planned.

On September 25, 2025, Crunchyroll announced that Crunchyroll Manga, an add-on service that would make hundreds of manga titles from across several publishers available to subscribers, launched as an app on October 9, 2025. Launch titles include One Piece, Jujutsu Kaisen, Daemons of the Shadow Realm, My Dress-Up Darling, The Summer Hikaru Died, Lycoris Recoil, Delicious in Dungeon, Sasaki and Miyano, Tsukimichi: Moonlit Fantasy, Maiden of the Dragon: Falling for the Demon's Lies, and many more, spanning multiple genres.

On November 10, 2025, Crunchyroll announced that it has partnered with Titan Publishing Group to bring more than 20 manga series, including ATOM: The Beginning, Burst Angel, and Speed Grapher to its catalog.

On December 8, 2025, Crunchyroll announced that 30 new series from J-Novel Club and other publishers would be added to Crunchyroll Manga. Ascendance of a Bookworm, Campfire Cooking in Another World with My Absurd Skill, May I Ask for One Final Thing?, and The Faraway Paladin were added to the platform.

On January 13, 2026, Crunchyroll announced that over 20 new manga series, including Seirei Gensouki: Spirit Chronicles and I Parry Everything were added to the service's catalog.

On February 10, 2026, Crunchyroll announced that it had added The Reincarnation of the Strongest Exorcist in Another World, Demon Lord, Retry!, and 30 more titles to the catalog.

On March 10, 2026, Crunchyroll announced that over 20 new series from J-Novel Club, COMPASS Manga, and Titan Manga would be added to the Crunchyroll Manga catalog. Titles added to the platform included Sanda, The Brilliant Healer's New Life in the Shadows, Maiden of the Dragon: Falling for the Demon's Lies, and Accidentally in Love: The Witch, the Knight, and the Love Potion Slipup.

== Publishing partners ==
Following the service launch in October 2025, Crunchyroll transitioned its digital manga offering to a standalone application. The current service operates through licensing agreements with multiple North American and Japanese publishers. Partner publishers for the service include:

Publisher	Year	Status	Ref
AlphaPolis	2025	Active	
COMPASS Manga	2025	Active	
Square Enix	2025	Active	
Viz Media	2025	Active	
Yen Press	2025	Active	
Titan Manga	2025	Active	
J-Novel Club	2025	Active	
Shueisha	2025	Active	
highstone	2026	Active	
MobileBook.jp	2026	Active	
ThirdlineNEXT	2026	Active	
