= Fort of Apocalypse =

Japanese manga series

- Cover of the first volume

アポカリプスの砦 (Apocalypse no Toride)
- Genre: Action; Horror; Science fiction
- Manga
- Written by: Yuu Kuraishi
- Illustrated by: Kazu Inabe
- Published by: Kodansha
- English publisher: NA: Kodansha USA (digital)
- Magazine: Monthly Shōnen Rival; Manga Box
- Original run: September 3, 2011 – October 9, 2015
- Volumes: 10

Fort of Apocalypse (Japanese: アポカリプスの砦, Hepburn: Apocalypse no Toride) is a Japanese manga series written by Yuu Kuraishi and illustrated by Kazu Inabe. It started serialization in Kodansha's Monthly Shōnen Rival magazine, before moving to their manga website Manga Box. It was published in ten tankōbon volumes.

== Publication ==
The series was written by Yuu Kuraishi and illustrated by Kazu Inabe. It started serialization in Monthly Shōnen Rival on September 3, 2011. After the magazine was ended, the series was transferred to Manga Box. The series ended in its tenth volume, which was released on October 9, 2015.

The series is licensed in English digitally by Kodansha USA. They released chapters of the series simultaneously with the Japanese release on Crunchyroll Manga. However, the series was removed from Crunchyroll Manga in 2018.

=== Volume list ===
No.	Original release date	Original ISBN	English release date	English ISBN
1	March 2, 2012	978-4-06-380207-8	November 3, 2015	978-1-68-233048-7
2	June 4, 2012	978-4-06-380219-1	November 3, 2015	978-1-68-233049-4
3	November 2, 2012	978-4-06-380244-3	November 10, 2015	978-1-68-233050-0
4	April 4, 2013	978-4-06-380263-4	November 17, 2015	978-1-68-233051-7
5	August 2, 2013	978-4-06-380279-5	November 24, 2015	978-1-68-233052-4
6	December 27, 2013	978-4-06-380293-1	December 1, 2015	978-1-68-233091-3
7	July 9, 2014	978-4-06-381315-9	December 8, 2015	978-1-68-233092-0
8	January 9, 2015	978-4-06-395278-0	December 15, 2015	978-1-68-233093-7
9	April 9, 2015	978-4-06-395377-0	January 12, 2016	978-1-68-233094-4
10	October 9, 2015	978-4-06-395524-8	January 12, 2016	978-1-68-233146-0

== Reception ==
Jason Thompson from Anime News Network listed the series on a list compiling ten great zombie manga series, calling it a "solid, page-turning zombie pulp". Takato from Manga News also praised it, calling it entertaining and suspenseful. Carlo Santos from the same website as Thompson called the series "terrifying and addictive", while also criticizing it for feeling a bit generic sometimes.

== See also ==
- My Wife is Wagatsuma-san, another manga series written by Yuu Kuraishi
- Starving Anonymous, another manga series by the same authors
