= Starving Anonymous =

Japanese manga series

- First volume cover

食糧人類-Starving Anonymous- (Shokuryō Jinrui: Starving Anonymous)
- Genre: Dystopian; Horror; Science fiction
- Manga
- Written by: Yuu Kuraishi
- Illustrated by: Kazu Inabe
- Published by: Kodansha
- English publisher: NA: Kodansha USA (digital)
- Magazine: e Young Magazine
- Original run: March 11, 2016 – November 5, 2018
- Volumes: 7
- Manga

Starving Anonymous Re:Velation
- Written by: Yuu Kuraishi
- Illustrated by: Kazu Inabe
- Published by: Kodansha
- English publisher: US: Kodansha
- Magazine: Comic Days
- Original run: April 8, 2021 – June 15, 2023
- Volumes: 7

Starving Anonymous (Japanese: 食糧人類-Starving Anonymous-, Hepburn: Shokuryō Jinrui: Starving Anonymous) is a Japanese manga series written by Yuu Kuraishi and illustrated by Kazu Inabe. It was serialized on the manga website e Young Magazine from March 2016 to November 2018, and published in seven tankōbon volumes.

A sequel series, titled Shokuryō Jinrui Re: Starving Re:velation, started serialization on the Comic Days manga website from April 2021 to June 15, 2023. As of July 2023, it has been published in seven tankōbon volumes.

== Premise ==
Set in a dystopian near-future facing climate change and shortages, teenager I'e is riding the bus home from school when all of the passengers begin to pass out. They have all been gassed.

I'e wakes up in a facility where captured humans are farmed, bred, and experimented on by other humans in the service of large, insect-like creatures they hope will save the planet.

I'e teams up with four others, his friend Kazu who was on the bus with him, a middle-aged man named Ogura who has been secretly living in the facility for years, and two men named Natsune and Yamabiki who have similarly avoided being trapped. The group attempts to explore and escape the facility, encountering other horrific revelations along the way.

== Publication ==
The series is written by Yuu Kuraishi and illustrated by Kazu Inabe. It started serialization on Kodansha's e Young Magazine manga website on March 11, 2016. The series finished serialization on November 5, 2018. The series was published in seven tankōbon volumes.

A sequel series, titled Starving Anonymous Re:Velation, started releasing on the Comic Days manga website on April 8, 2021. The sequel is also written by Yuu Kuraishi and illustrated by Kazu Inabe. As of July 2023, the sequel has been published in seven tankōbon volumes.

In February 2018, Kodansha USA announced they licensed the series for English publication digitally. Kodansha are publishing the sequel series in English on their K Manga service.

=== Volume list ===
==== Main series ====
No.	Original release date	Original ISBN	English release date	English ISBN
1	September 20, 2016	978-4-06-382855-9	March 13, 2018	978-1-64-212176-6
2	March 17, 2017	978-4-06-382941-9	April 10, 2018	978-1-64-212177-3
3	June 20, 2017	978-4-06-382985-3	May 29, 2018	978-1-64-212178-0
4	November 20, 2017	978-4-06-510305-0	June 12, 2018	978-1-64-212290-9
5	April 20, 2018	978-4-06-511264-9	July 10, 2018	978-1-64-212319-7
6	September 20, 2018	978-4-06-512702-5	January 8, 2019	978-1-64-212615-0
7	February 20, 2019	978-4-06-514554-8	June 18, 2019	978-1-64-212893-2

==== Sequel ====
No.	Release date	ISBN
1	September 8, 2021	978-4-06-524869-0
2	January 12, 2022	978-4-06-526537-6
3	April 13, 2022	978-4-06-527396-8
4	September 14, 2022	978-4-06-529220-4
5	February 8, 2023	978-4-06-530635-2
6	April 12, 2023	978-4-06-531335-0
7	July 12, 2023	978-4-06-532413-4

== Reception ==
Bernard Monasterolo from Le Monde praised the plot for its "morbid imagination", and called the art a "real success". Koiwai from Manga News also praised the first volume, calling it a "successful introduction". Erwan Lafleuriel from IGN also praised the plot, stating it was "carried out smoothly". Contrary to Monasterolo, Koiwai, and Lafleuriel's thoughts, Katherine Dacey from Manga Critic criticized the series, calling the story "efficient but artless" and stating the art "ranges from slickly generic to willfully ugly".

The series ranked tenth in the first Next Manga Award in the web manga category.

== See also ==
- Fort of Apocalypse — Another manga series by the same authors.
- My Wife is Wagatsuma-san — Another manga series written by Yuu Kuraishi.
