= Otouto Catcher Ore Pitcher De! =

Japanese manga series

弟キャッチャー俺ピッチャーで！ (Otouto Kyaccha Ore Piccha De!)
- Genre: Sports, Baseball
- Manga
- Written by: Shinji Tonaka
- Published by: Kodansha
- Magazine: Monthly Shōnen Rival
- Original run: August 4, 2008 – 2014
- Volumes: 15

Otouto Catcher Ore Pitcher De! (弟キャッチャー俺ピッチャーで！, Otouto Kyaccha Ore Piccha De!) is a Japanese shōnen manga series written and illustrated by Shinji Tonaka. It has been serialized in Monthly Shōnen Rival since May 2008. Tankōbon volumes containing four chapters are published by Kodansha. The first tankōbon of the series was released in August 2008 and the latest in December 2012.
