= My Wife is Wagatsuma-san =

Manga series

- First tankōbon volume cover

我妻さんは俺のヨメ (Wagatsuma-san wa Ore no Yome)
- Genre: Romantic comedy
- Manga
- Written by: Yuu Kuraishi
- Illustrated by: Keishi Nishikida
- Published by: Kodansha
- English publisher: NA: Kodansha USA
- Magazine: Weekly Shōnen Magazine
- Original run: September 20, 2011 – September 24, 2014
- Volumes: 13
- icon

My Wife is Wagatsuma-san (我妻さんは俺のヨメ, Wagatsuma-san wa Ore no Yome), (Note: Ai's surname, Wagatsuma (我妻), means 'my wife' in Japanese.) is a Japanese manga series written by Yuu Kuraishi and illustrated by Keishi Nishikida. It was serialised in Kodansha's shōnen manga magazine Weekly Shōnen Magazine from September 2011 to September 2014, with its chapters collected in 13 tankōbon volumes. It was released weekly on Crunchyroll Manga in English, with digital releases in volumes on Amazon Kindle and ComiXology.

== Plot ==
Hitoshi Aoshima is an unpopular high schooler with average grades. He longs to have a girlfriend, especially the beautiful and smart Ai Wagatsuma. One day, he discovers he has time slipped 10 years in the future, where he is married to Ai. However, the time spent in the future is short-lived as he returns to regular time. Hitoshi is able to use some of his future knowledge to gain insights into what Ai likes, but soon discovers that some of his present actions can affect his future, including scenarios where he is not married to Ai. He also hangs out with a group of unpopular and quirky classmates called the DX Corps, and makes other friends including a female foreign exchange student and a fairly popular boy that the DX Corps disliked.

== Characters ==
Hitoshi Aoshima (青島等, Aoshima Hitoshi)
A second-year high school student who dreams of having a girlfriend. He has the ability to time slip ten years into the future, where he is married to Ai Wagatsuma, although he cannot control when he slips or returns. He is unpopular and gets average grades, and is a member of Zaishou High's volleyball team where he and his friends are benchwarmers.^{Ch. 1} He ends up associating with the DX Corps, a secret society in his high school whose members are jealous of popular male students.^{Ch. 7} His DX Corps codename is Laputa: Castle in the Sky.^{Vol. 6 profiles}
Ai Wagatsuma (我妻亜衣, Wagatsuma Ai)
The title character is the most attractive girl in school. She is known for her beauty, high grades and distinction in athletics.^{Vol. 2 profiles} She is happily married to Hitoshi in the latter's time-slipped future. She is fond of animals and aspires to be a veterinarian. She is a star member of the swim club but injures her leg at a major swim competition.^{Ch. 2}
Hikari Aoshima (青島ひかり)
Hitoshi's little sister who is in fifth grade in elementary school.^{Ch. 1} She turns into a good-looking and fashionable gyaru in the future.^{Vol. 3 profiles}
DX Corps (DX団, DX-dan)
The DX Corps are a secret society of unpopular high school boys. They despise "life-havers who glorify romance". In addition to Hitoshi, there are the following members:^{Ch. 2}

- Masao Komatsu (小松正男) – Hitoshi's friend with a flat top hairstyle.^{Ch. 1} He is the leader of the DX Corps. In the future, he goes bald. His DX Corps codename is Unbreakable.^{Vol. 6 profiles}
- Shirou Itou (伊東志郎) – Hitoshi's portly friend with glasses and a mushroom bowl cut. His family is rich, and lives in a mansion.^{Ch. 21} He adores Japanese idol groups such as AKB48.^{Ch. 1} Hitoshi saves him from becoming a sex offender in the future.^{Vol. 3 profiles} His DX corps codename is Holey Underwear.^{Vol. 6 profiles}
- Kyuuji Fujikawa (富士川久次) – codenamed Gate of Flesh (肉体の門, Nikutai no Mon) (because of his gluttony and consequent fatness) and "Fuji Q" (富士Q).^{Ch. 2} In one of the future scenarios, he becomes a Monk when Hitoshi marries Itsuko Kaji, who Kyuuji fell in love with.
- Yasushi Ono (小野靖史) – codenamed Matrix 2 (マトリックス2, Matorikkusu 2)^{Ch. 2} He likes little girls. His nickname comes from his uncle, an indie wrestler who fights as 'Matrix Zaishou'. His family owns a liquor store.^{Ch. 56}
- Kouji Nakamoto (中本高次) – codenamed Electric Medusa (でんきくらげ, Denki Kurage; lit. "Electric Jellyfish")^{Ch. 2} He likes hacking into phones, but is still the 'most normal' of the DX Corps and occasionally questions their more idiotic moments.^{Ch. 60}

Silvia Shimotsuma (下妻シルヴィア)
A foreign exchange student from the Netherlands who becomes friends with Hitoshi and Ai. She is half-Japanese and half-Dutch, and is fairly buxom.^{Vol. 6 profiles} In some of the future scenarios she becomes Hitoshi's wife; in others, she is a close friend of Hitoshi and Ai, alongside the DX Corps members. Her brother, Kenjiro Shimotsuma (下妻ケンジロウ) does not approve of Silvia staying in Japan. He is modelled on Kenshiro from Fist of the North Star; their three elder brothers are likewise modelled on Kenshiro's.^{Ch.42}
Yuuki Dobashi (土橋勇樹)
A schoolmate who is popular with the girls, which led to the formation of the DX Corps. In one of the future scenarios, his life is ruined, so Hitoshi changes it for the better so that Dobashi becomes friends with Hitoshi and even becomes friendly with the DX Corps.
Hagakure (葉隠)

The Hagakure are a trio of nerdy girls who enjoy boys love comics. They get upset that the DX Corps have become popular despite being nerdy, and end up in a contest with them. They include the following:

- Yoshiko Tanaka (田中良子) She is proud of her F-cup breasts.^{Vol. 8 profiles} Although there is chemistry between Tanaka and Komatsu, it is dispelled when Dobashi passes by – the comparison of the two boys puts Komatsu completely out of the running.
- Miki Fujimura (藤村美紀) A "history nerd" who likes Masamune Date, to the point of becoming physically violent if she considers someone to be mocking him, as Itou does with his impersonation.^{Vol. 8 profiles}
- Ran Itou (伊富蘭) – A shy girl who hardly ever talks. She aspires to become a manga artist, and is quite good looking.^{Vol. 8 profiles} She develops a crush on Hitoshi, and later becomes his wife in a potential scenario. Her manga is even made into an anime.

Itsuko Kaji (梶五月子)
A substitute teacher whose everyday clumsiness and actions tend to be erotic. She is the love interest of Kyuuji and becomes the wife of Hitoshi in one potential scenario.
Fumio Seki (関文夫)
A new math teacher at Hitoshi's school. He becomes the advisor of the volleyball team.^{Vol. 13 profiles} He is later revealed to be a time slipper who has watched over Hitoshi's activities.^{Vol. 13 profiles}

== Release ==
Written by Yuu Kuraishi and illustrated by Keishi Nishikida, the manga was serialised by the magazine Weekly Shōnen Magazine and published by Kodansha in Japan and has been licensed to stream in Crunchyroll Manga for its international audience. 111 chapters were published with the final chapter on September 24, 2014. Kuraishi said that it was impossible for him to be a manga creator and work at a restrauant chain at the same time. 13 volumes have been published by Kodansha.

My Wife is Wagatsuma-san was listed among the first 12 Kodansha titles that were launched for Crunchyroll Manga.

=== Volumes ===
With a few exceptions, the chapter titles in the Japanese editions were printed in English. The first eleven chapters are numbered with a hash mark as in "#1", "#2", etc. They are numbered with a "N" in this list. The chapters after that are numbered as parts as in "PART1", "PART2", etc. They are numbered plainly on this list. The English version as published on Amazon Kindle/ComiXology also uses these translations.

No.	Original release date	Original ISBN	North American release date	North American ISBN
1	February 17, 2012	9784063846386	November 3, 2015	—
N1. "Aoshima's Burning"; N2. "Complete Control"; N3. "Creepy Otaku Riot"; N4. "I Fought the Flag"; N5. "Stay or Go Home"
2	September 14, 2012	9784063847260	November 3, 2015	—
N6-1. "Last Gang in Class"; N6-2. "Dobashi on My Back"; N7. "DX Save the Queen"; N8. "First Kiss Opportunities"; N9. "Give 'Em Enough Rope"; N10. "Should I Stay or Should I Go"
3	November 16, 2012	9784063847741	November 10, 2015	—
N11. "Something about Yama-chan" (Something about 山ちゃん); 1. "Career Opportunities"; 2. "DX's Burnin"; 3. "Aicora Riot"; 4. "Communication Breakdown"; 5. "Won't Get Pool Again"
4	January 17, 2013	9784063848014	November 17, 2015	—
6. "Deny"; 7. "Know Your Future"; 8. "Change the World"; 9. "Tea in the Akiba"; 10. "Iron Man"; 11. "Synchronicity"; 12. "Strutter"; 13. "Ride the Lightning"; 14. "Aoshima First Stand"
5	April 17, 2013	9784063848502	November 24, 2015	—
15. "Got To Be There"; 16. "By the Way"; 17. "Just Like a Dream"; 18. "Brown Sugar"; 19. "Sympathy for the Brother"; 20. "Classroom Rock"; 21. "Go! Go! Maniac"; 22. "Don't Stop Me Now"; 23. "St. Anger"
6	July 17, 2013	9784063848953	December 1, 2015	—
24. "Dance Everybody"; 25. "ABC"; 26. "Changes"; 27. "Fire"; 28. "Blitzkrieg Bop"; 29. "Last Train To Nara"; 30. "Help"; 31. "Get Back"; 32. "Beth"
7	September 17, 2013	9784063949292	December 8, 2015	—
33. "Sheer Heart Attack"; 34. "Lonely As You"; 35. "Burn"; 36. "Strawberry Fields"; 37. "The Wall"; 38. "Harder, Better, Faster, Stronger"; 39. "While My Pen Gently Weeps"; 40. "Let's Spend the Evening Together"; 41. "Runaway Baby"; Extra Part: "Be Here Now"
8	November 15, 2013	9784063949667	December 15, 2015	—
43. "Come Together"; 44. "It's Hard"; 45. "Subterranean Homsick Nederlanders"; 46. "Enter the Sandgirl"; 47. "Sandanista!"; 48. "He Said Yeah"; 49. "Jealous Guy"; 50. "Studying Class Hero"; 51. "Party Rock Anthem"; 52. "War Is Over"
9	January 17, 2014	9784063949964	December 22, 2015	—
52. "Danger Zone"; 53. "Like a Rolling Stone"; 54. "Love Potion Number 9"; 55. "Low"; 56. "Livin' on a Prayer"; 57. "Dirty Mind"; 58. "Man in the Ring"; 59. "Brand New Event"; 60. "Magical Mystery Tour"
10	March 17, 2014	9784063950304	December 29, 2015	—
61. "Here, There, and Everywhere"; 62. "Power of Love"; 63. "Are You Experienced"; 64. "War Pigs"; 65. "Bold As Love"; 66. "Little Wing"; 67. "Zoo"; 68. "Running Free"; 69. "Paint It Black"
11	June 17, 2014	9784063950816	January 5, 2016 –	—
70. "It's Over"; 71. "She doesn't love you" 72. "Mamma Mia"; 73. "Man in the mirror" 74. "Wild teacher" 75. "Buddhist Now"; 76. "Enter the Cookman"; 77. "How About This"; 78. "Thriller"
12	August 16, 2014	9784063951615	January 12, 2016	—
79. "Take No Prisoners"; 80. "Feel Good Inc."; 81. "Random Access Memories"; 82. "Yeah!"; 83. "Before My Body is Dry"; 84. "Re: I AM"; 85. "Can't Hold Us"; 86. "Countdown to Extinction"; 87. "After Forever"; 88. " Let There Be Light"
13	October 17, 2014	9784063952179	January 19, 2016	—
89. "Times Like These"; 90. "Last Gang in High School"; 91. "All Summer Long"; 92. "All Summer Long 2"; 93. "Ex-Factor"; 94. "Say Something"; 95. "Roll Away the Stone"; 96. "Let It Go"; 97. "It's All Over Now, Baby Blue"; 98. "With a Little Help from my Friends"

== Reception ==
Jason Thompson, in his review on Anime News Network, gave the manga 2 1/2 out of 4 stars. He described the manga series as "a pleasant surprise by getting funnier and funnier" and that "it's a cute premise handled in clever and silly ways." Deb Aoki wrote in Publishers Weekly that the series sounds similar to How I Met Your Mother.

== See also ==
- Fort of Apocalypse, another manga series written by Kuraishi
- Starving Anonymous, another manga series written by Kuraishi

== Works cited ==
- "Ch." is shortened form for chapter and refers to a chapter number of the My Wife is Wagatsuma-san manga. "Ch. N(number)" refers to the first set of chapters before it was reformatted.
