= Monthly Shōnen Rival =

Japanese manga magazine

- Categories: Shōnen manga
- Frequency: Monthly
- Circulation: 48,000 (2013)
- Publisher: Kodansha
- First issue: April 4, 2008
- Final issue: June 4, 2014
- Country: Japan
- Based in: Tokyo
- Language: Japanese
- Website: Official website (archived)

Monthly Shōnen Rival (Japanese: 月刊少年ライバル, Hepburn: Gekkan Shounen Raibaru) was a Japanese monthly shōnen manga magazine by Kodansha that ran from April 4, 2008, to June 4, 2014. It was issued on the 4th of every month.

As with Shueisha's Jump Square and Shogakukan's Monthly Shōnen Sunday, it was aimed at audiences in their late-teens and early-twenties.

Shōnen Rival was a replacement of Comic BomBom, which ended in December 2007 due to decline in interest. Shōnen Rival followed the same fate and due to decline in interest the final issue was released on June 4, 2014. Kodansha noted that it was reassessing its manga magazine lineup to aim for more growth, and therefore stopped publication on Monthly Shōnen Rival and conducted research for the new magazine that would replace it.

Though most of the series had managed to end by the final issue, all unfinished series were transferred to online platforms such as Manga Box and Shin Zasshi Kenkyūjō (新雑誌研究所; lit. 'New Comic Research Institute').

== Shōnen Rival Series ==
	Series Title English / Japanese / Romanized	Artist	Author	First Issue	Last Issue
01	Aoi-sama ga Ikasete Ageru 葵さまがイかせてアゲル	Kiki Suihei	－	2008.05	2009.09
02	Blazer Drive ブレイザードライブ (Bureizā Doraibu)	Seishi Kishimoto	－	2008.05	2011.12
03	Cinema-kun シネマルくん (Shinemarukun)	Natsuki Matsuzawa	－	2008.05	2010.07
04	Edogawa George 江戸川ジョージ (Edogawa Jōji)	Yūichirō Omae	－	2008.05	2009.04
05	Emma エンマ (Enma)	Saki Nonoyama	Kei Tsuchiya	2008.05	2010.12
06	Gyaruo the Bakutan! ギャル男 THE 爆誕!	Amagi Nakamura	－	2008.05	2010.01
07	Holy Talker ホーリートーカー (Hōrī Tōkā)	Rando Ayamine	－	2008.05	2010.04
08	Honto ni Atta! Reibai Sensei ほんとにあった!霊媒先生	Hidekichi Matsumoto	－	2008.05	2014.07
09	Imasugu Click! いますぐクリック! (Imasugu Kurikku!)	Takeru Nagayoshi	－	2008.05	2014.05
10	Kikai Shōnen Megaboy 機械少年メカボーイ (Kikai Shōnen Megabōi)	Nobuhiro Kawanishi	－	2008.05	2009.03
11	Kitsune no Yomeiri きつねのよめいり	Satoshi Takagi	－	2008.05	2011.08
12	Kurōbi! Hayata クロオビ!隼太	Kazuya Sakuta	－	2008.05	2011.03
13	Meitantei Pashiri-kun! 名探偵パシリくん!	Tamako Umi	Wain Hinamatsuri	2008.05	2009.05
14	Monster Hunter Orage モンスターハンター オラージュ (Monsutā Hantā Orāju)	Hiro Mashima	－	2008.05	2009.06
15	Otōto Catcher Ore Pitcher de! 弟キャッチャー俺ピッチャーで! (Otōto Kyatchā Ore Pitchā de!)	Shinji Tonaka	－	2008.05	2014.07
16	unCassandra アンカサンドラ (Ankasandora)	Gumi Amashi	Gorō Hifumishi	2008.05	2008.12
17	Zettai Hakase Kolisch 絶対博士コーリッシュ (Zettai Hakase Kōrisshu)	Yuki Kobayashi	－	2008.05	2011.01
18	Mukōgawa no Masaka むこうがわのまさか	Amadori	－	2008.06	2009.01
19	Majimagumi Hunter Mikuni Shin no Karyūdo Seikatsu 真島組ハンター三國シンの狩人生活	Shin Mikuni	－	2008.06	2009.06
20	Lancelot Full Throttle ランスロットフルスロットル (Ransurotto Furu Surottoru)	Dynamic Tarō	－	2008.07	2009.03
21	Kimitaka no Ateru! キミタカの当破!	Tatsuya Kaneda	－	2008.08	2009.04
22	Out Code: Chōjō Hanzai Tokumu Sōsakan アウトコード 超常犯罪特務捜査官 (Auto Kōdo)	Karin Suzuragi	Haruhiko Himenogi	2008.08	2009.09
23	Magatsuhi.com 禍霊ドットコム (Magatsuhi Dotto Komu)	Sōda Inui	Kazumasa Mori	2008.09	2009.09
24	MAGiCO	Chikara Sakuma	－	2008.09	2014.06
25	The iDOLM@STER Break! アイドルマスターブレイク! (Aidorumasutā Bureiku!)	Takuya Fujima	－	2008.10	2010.11
26	Buster Keel!	Kenshirō Sakamoto	－	2008.11	2012.08
27	Tsumuji VS. つむじVS.	Yōichi Tomoyasu	－	2009.01	2009.06
28	Akatsuki; AKATSUKI -朱憑-	Motoki Koide	－	2009.02	2012.01
29	Spray King	Shin Mikuni	－	2009.02	2010.02
30	Shikabane 13-gō シカバネ13号	Tamago Marui	－	2009.04	2009.12
31	Fort of Apocalypse アポカリプスの砦	Yuu Kuraishi; Kazu Inabe	—	2011.7	2014.6

== Reception ==
Originally in 2008 the magazine started with 300,000 in circulation per month, but due to decline in interest it felt down to 48,000 copies per month in 2013. By 2014, the circulation was 18,000.
