= Seishi Kishimoto =

Japanese manga artist (born 1974)

- 岸本 聖史
- Born: November 8, 1974 (age 51); Nagi, Okayama, Japan
- Occupation: Manga artist
- Years active: 2001–present
- Known for: O-Parts Hunter
- Relatives: Masashi Kishimoto (twin brother)

Seishi Kishimoto (Japanese: 岸本 聖史, Hepburn: Kishimoto Seishi; born November 8, 1974) is a Japanese manga artist. He is best known for O-Parts Hunter, which was serialized in Monthly Shōnen Gangan from 2001 to 2007. He has since completed four more manga series, Blazer Drive (2008–2011), Kurenai no Ōkami to Ashikase no Hitsuji (2011–2013), Sukedachi 09 (2014–2016), and Mad Chimera World (2017–2019).

== Biography ==
Seishi Kishimoto was born in Okayama Prefecture, Japan, on November 8, 1974, as the younger identical twin of Masashi Kishimoto. In elementary school, Kishimoto started watching the anime adaptation of Kinnikuman alongside his brother and the two of them began to design their own superheroes.

Kishimoto's first manga was the one-shot Trigger published in Square Enix's Gangan Powered in 2001. With the story he wanted to write about "faith and parent-child relationships", but had trouble fitting it within the page limit. He began his first serialized work, O-Parts Hunter, in Monthly Shōnen Gangan in 2001. The manga continued for six years and has been translated and released in several foreign countries, including in North America by Viz Media. A year after O-Parts Hunter ended, Kishimoto launched Blazer Drive in the April 2008 debut issue of Kodansha's Monthly Shōnen Rival. Preceded by a prequel one-shot titled Tribal in the final issue of Comic BomBom, Blazer Drive ran until December 2010 and received a video game adaptation. He then created the one-shot Jūniji no Kaneganaru, which was published in the monthly shōjo magazine Aria in 2011. In the January 2012 issue of Monthly Shōnen Rival, Kishimoto debuted Kurenai no Ōkami to Ashikase no Hitsuji, which ran until 2013.

In 2014, Kishimoto began work on Sukedachi 09, a pair of linked print and digital series in Monthly Shōnen Gangan and Gangan Online which take place at the same time but follow different protagonists. The print series debuted in the November 2014 issue of Monthly Shōnen Gangan on October 11, while the digital series was released in Gangan Online on October 16. Sukedachi 09 ended in the August 2016 issue, published on July 12. In July 2016, digital distributor Crunchyroll acquired the manga for English release on their website.

Kishimoto began the seinen action series Mad Chimera World in the June 2017 issue of Kodansha's Monthly Morning Two magazine, which was released on April 22. A special one-shot of the series was published in the November 16, 2017, issue of Weekly Morning to celebrate the magazine's 35th anniversary. The series ended in the magazine's March 2019 issue, which was released on January 22.

On January 20, 2021, DeNA's free Manga Box website and application published the one-shot Yobigami, which Kishimoto drew for the second episode of the TBS TV show Oh! My Boss! Koi wa Bessatsu de. He was credited by the name Ukyō Arazome (荒染右京) for the work, after the character who drew the manga on the show. To celebrate Manga Box's eighth anniversary, Kishimoto launched the weekly "battle fantasy" shōnen manga Monster Life and the Earth, which expands the world of Yobigami, on December 4, 2021. It ended in August 2023.

Kishimoto is set to launch the manga Kamiyashiro: Jikosatsu no Kei on Line Manga on January 25, 2026, and Manga Box at a later date.

== Style and influences ==
Seishi and his twin brother Masashi have been drawing manga together since early childhood, thus their styles are similar. As a result, each of them has frequently been accused of copying the other, not just artwork, but story elements as well. Seishi himself notes that the similarities are not intentional but are likely because they were both influenced by many of the same things.

== Works ==
Serializations

- 666 Satan (666〜サタン〜) (September 2001 – January 2008; serialized in Monthly Shōnen Gangan)
- Blazer Drive (ブレイザードライブ) (May 2008 – December 2010; serialized in Monthly Shōnen Rival)
- Kurenai no Ōkami to Ashikase no Hitsuji (紅の狼と足枷の羊; "Crimson Wolf and Fetters of Sheep") (December 2011 – February 2013; serialized in Monthly Shōnen Rival)
- Sukedachi 09 (助太刀09; "Assist Nine") (October 2014 – July 2016; serialized in Monthly Shōnen Gangan and Gangan Online)
- Mad Chimera World (マッドキメラワールド, Maddo Kimera Wārudo) (April 2017 – January 2019; serialized in Monthly Morning Two)
- Monster Life and the Earth (モンスターの医者, Monster no Isha) (December 2021–August 2023; serialized on Manga Box)
- Kamiyashiro: Jikosatsu no Kei (カミヤシロ 事故殺の京) (January 2026–present; serialized on Line Manga and Manga Box)

One-shots

- Trigger (March 2001; published in Gangan Powered and reprinted in 666 Satan volume 6)
- Tenchu San (天誅 参; "Tenchu: Wrath of Heaven") (March – April 2003; published in Monthly Shōnen Gangan)
- Tribal (トライバル) (November 2007, published in Comic BomBom and reprinted in Blazer Drive volume 1)
- Jūniji no Kaneganaru (12時の鐘が鳴る; "Twelve O'Clock Bell Rings") (April 2011; published in Aria)
- Mad Chimera World Gaiden (マッドキメラワールド外伝) (November 16, 2017; published in Weekly Morning)
- Yobigami (ヨビガミ) (January 20, 2021; published on Manga Box, credited as "Ukyō Arazome")
