= O-Parts Hunter =

Japanese manga series

- Cover of the first manga volume

666 ～サタン～ (Roku-Roku-Roku Satan)
- Genre: Adventure; Comedy; Fantasy
- Manga
- Written by: Seishi Kishimoto
- Published by: Square Enix
- English publisher: NA: Viz Media; Yen Press (digital)
- Imprint: Gangan Comics
- Magazine: Monthly Shōnen Gangan
- Original run: August 11, 2001 – December 12, 2007
- Volumes: 19
- icon

O-Parts Hunter, known as 666 Satan (Japanese: 666 ～サタン～, Hepburn: Roku-Roku-Roku Satan) in Japan, is a Japanese manga series written and illustrated by Seishi Kishimoto. It was originally published by Enix, who later became Square Enix, in their Monthly Shōnen Gangan magazine from August 2001 to December 2007, with the chapters collected into 19 tankōbon volumes. The series draws heavily from Kabbalistic traditions and Abrahamic demonology for its plot, and less so on Japanese folklore. 666 Satan has been released internationally in Spain, France, Italy and North America, although, Viz Media changed the title to O-Parts Hunter in the latter.

== Synopsis ==
=== Setting ===
O-Parts (オーパーツ, Ō Pātsu), named after out-of-place artifacts (OOPArts), are ancient relics found throughout the world, left by an extinct civilization from before mankind existed. They are primarily used as weapons or forms of transportation, but many are tools for tasks such as cooking. The people who are able to use O-Parts are known as O.P.T.s (オプト, Oputo; O-Part Tacticians), who are able to release their Spirit (スピリッツ, Supirittsu) and focus it into the O-Part, which it then absorbs and uses as energy to activate a special Effect (エフェクト, Efekuto), usually of a fantastic nature. There are some cases when the Effect of a single O-Part varies for each person who uses it, due to their Spirits being different. O-Parts are appraised and given a ranking out of seven, from E to SS, based on its effect, difficulty to use, and power. O-Parts ranked A or above are extremely powerful and are supposed to be handed over to the government.

Throughout the world, there are ten Angels (天使, Tenshi) and ten Demons (悪魔, Akuma) with amazing powers that are sealed within humans. They are being searched for by the Stea Government (Angels) and the Zenom Syndicate (Demons) who want to insert them within the Kabbalah (正カバラ, Sei Kabara; lit. 'Positive Kabbalah') and the Reverse Kabbalah (逆（リバース）カバラ, Gyaku (Ribāsu) Kabara), that are found on the North and South Pole respectively. A legend tells that when either Kabbalah is filled, a super weapon called the Legendary O-Part (伝説のオーパーツ, Densetsu no Ō Pātsu) will be awoken. As such, Angels and Demons are often referred to as Recipes (レシピ, Reshipi).

=== Plot ===
Set in the near future, it tells the story of a teenage girl named Ruby Crescent who wants to become a treasure hunter, following in the footsteps of her father. Her objective is to find O-Parts: magical items hidden in ruins which grant people fantastical powers and can only be used by an O.P.T. (O-Part Tactician). She soon meets a mysterious boy named Jio Freed who, due to having a dark, lonely past, seeks to conquer the world. Jio is hostile to her at first but ends up traveling with Ruby as her bodyguard. When Ruby is attacked by an O.P.T., who claims to be Satan, Jio rushes to her rescue and a battle occurs. Initially they are on the losing side, but Jio releases his true power and is revealed to be not only an O.P.T., but the real Satan. Thus, the two continue to travel together in hopes of achieving their dreams.

== Production ==
O-Parts Hunter takes many elements from Kishimoto's one-shot Trigger published in Gangan Powered in 2001, such as people known as Triggers being the only ones able to use weapons (as opposed to O.P.T.s), the country called "Stea" (Stea Government), and the Ultimate Weapon Gauntlet (Legendary O-Part). Jio takes his trademark scarf from Trigger's protagonist Sig, while the marks on his face are left over from Jio's initial design, which was that of a Native American. Ruby's initial design wore an explorer's outfit and was taller and "more mature", however, Kishimoto's supervisor told him she was not cute. Ball initially had a rounder face and longer hair.

== Release ==
Written and illustrated by Seishi Kishimoto, 666 Satan was serialized in Square Enix's (originally Enix) shōnen manga magazine Monthly Shōnen Gangan from August 11, 2001, (Note: It started in the September 2001 issue of the magazine, released on August 11 of the same year.) to December 12, 2007. The 76 chapters were later collected and released as 19 tankōbon volumes from December 20, 2001, to February 22, 2008.

In 2006, Viz Media licensed 666 Satan for an English-language release in North America. However, it changed its title to "O-Parts Hunter". The series' retains the original 666 Satan name in all the other countries it has been released, such as in France by Kurokawa, in Italy by Edizioni BD's J-Pop division, in Spain by Glénat, and in Taiwan by Chingwin Publishing Group. In 2010, Square Enix themselves began distributing the series digitally on their websites for North America and France. However, they discontinued their digital manga service in May 2013.

== Reception ==
Publishers Weekly referred to the manga as a "humorous [and] surprisingly moving shonen treat." They finished their review by saying instead of relying on cliffhangers to get the reader to buy the next volume, "Kishimoto depends on another, more difficult-to-achieve effect—generating real concern for Jio and his friends, regardless of what comes next." Jarred Pine of Mania.com called the series "derivative," claiming it borrows elements from several popular manga series such as Dragon Ball and One Piece, but stated that this does not make it any less enjoyable. He called the action scenes the story's highlight and praised its fast pace, giving volume one a B+ rating. A. E. Sparrow of IGN titled the header for his review of the series as "Naruto is in its blood", referring to the fact that the creators of 666 Satan and Naruto are twin brothers. Sparrow said that one reads the series when "you feel you've outgrown Naruto and want to find something with a bit more to it." Jason Thompson declared Viz Media's changing of the series' title to "O-Parts Hunter" in North America one of "The Greatest Censorship Fails" in manga.
