= Animeism =

Late night anime programming block

- Logo used by the block since 2019
- Network: MBS
- Launched: October 6, 2006; 20 years ago (Original); April 2012; 14 years ago (Current form)
- Division of: JNN
- Country of origin: Japan
- Sister network: TBS, CBC, BS-TBS
- Format: Anime
- Running time: Saturdays 1:53–2:23 (JST)
- Original language: Japanese
- Official website: Official website

Super Animeism Super Animeism Turbo
- Network: MBS
- Launched: March 9, 2019; 7 years ago (SA); April 5, 2024; 2 years ago (SAT)
- Closed: March 23, 2024; 2 years ago (SA)
- Division of: JNN
- Country of origin: Japan
- Sister network: TBS
- Format: Anime
- Running time: Saturdays 1:25-1:55 JST (SA); Fridays 0:26-0:56 JST (SAT)
- Original language: Japanese

Animeism (Japanese: アニメイズム, Hepburn: Animeizumu) is a Japanese late night anime programming block produced by MBS, and airs on all JNN affiliate stations, including TBS, CBC and BS-TBS.

As of October 2025, the programming block airs on Friday nights/Saturday mornings on a local timeslot on MBS, TBS, CBC and BS-TBS only, as well as the "Super Animeism Turbo" block on Thursday nights/Friday mornings that airs on a network timeslot on all affiliate stations, replacing the "Super Animeism" block that aired alongside the aforementioned block.

== History ==
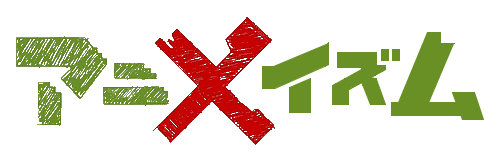
Logo used by the block until 2019

The programming block was launched in October 2006, initially as a half-hour programming block in order to broadcast anime titles which were co-produced by MBS, beginning with Code Geass: Lelouch of the Rebellion. In April 2011, the block expanded to a one-hour block, and relaunched in April 2012 as Animeism. In April 2015, the network reorganized the block from Thursday nights/Friday mornings to Friday nights/Saturday mornings, with MBS chief producer Hirō Maruyama stating that the change was done in order to prevent conflicts with Fuji TV's broadcast of Noitamina.

On March 8, 2019, MBS introduced the Super Animeism block, which expands the Animeism block by a half-hour from July of that same year. The block has since been replaced with Super Animeism Turbo with effect from April 2024, and airs on Thursday nights/Friday mornings instead of Friday nights/Saturday mornings.

On March 23 of that same year, it was announced at AnimeJapan 2019 that MBS, Kodansha, and DMM Pictures formed a two-year partnership to co-produce anime titles for the block, either adapting works from Kodansha-published manga, or creating original works into anime, with Domestic Girlfriend becoming the first program to air with the partnership. It has since ceased with the release of Blue Period.

=== Partnership with Amazon Prime Video ===
In June 2017, Amazon signed a deal to stream titles exclusively from the block, on Amazon Prime Video worldwide, with Rage of Bahamut: Virgin Soul and Altair: A Record of Battles becoming the first titles exclusive to Prime Video on June 29 of the same year. Since January 2019, the deal was no longer in effect worldwide, with other distributors of Hidive, Crunchyroll and Funimation beginning to license titles from the block, leaving Prime Video to only exclusively stream in Japan.

== Titles ==
#	Block	Title	Time Slot	Start date (Note: All dates shown are reflective of the actual calendar date of broadcast.)	End date	Eps.	Studio	Notes
1	B2	Natsuiro Kiseki	1:25	April 7, 2012	June 30, 2012	12	Sunrise	Original work.
2	B1	Eureka Seven: AO	1:55	April 13, 2012	September 29, 2012 (Note: Eureka Seven: AO went on a two-week hiatus due to TBS' coverage of the 2012 Summer Olympics, thus ending its run on the third-to-last episode. The two final episodes were broadcast on November 19 of the same year.)	24	Bones	Sequel to Eureka Seven.
3	B2	Joshiraku	1:25	July 6, 2012	September 29, 2012	13	J.C.Staff	Based on the manga series by Kōji Kumeta.
4	B1	K	1:30	October 5, 2012	December 28, 2012	13	GoHands	Original work.
5	B2	Blast of Tempest	2:00	October 5, 2012	March 29, 2013	24	Bones	Based on the manga series by Kyō Shirodaira.
6	B1	Vividred Operation	1:30	January 11, 2013	March 29, 2013	12	A-1 Pictures	Original work.
7	B2	Devil Survivor 2: The Animation	2:05	April 5, 2013	June 28, 2013	13	Bridge	Based on the video game by Atlus.
8	B1	Valvrave the Liberator	1:35	April 12, 2013	June 28, 2013	12	Sunrise	Original work.
9	B1	Danganronpa: The Animation	1:35	July 5, 2013	September 27, 2013	13	Lerche	Based on the video game by Spike.
10	B2	Love Lab	2:05	July 5, 2013	September 27, 2013	13	Doga Kobo	Based on the manga series by Ruri Miyahara.
11	B2	Kill la Kill	2:05	October 4, 2013	March 28, 2014	24	Trigger	Original work.
12	B1	Valvrave the Liberator (Season 2)	1:35	October 11, 2013	December 27, 2013	12	Sunrise	Sequel to Valvrave the Liberator.
13	B1	Hozuki's Coolheadedness	1:35	January 10, 2014	April 4, 2014	13	Wit Studio	Based on the manga series by Natsumi Eguchi.
14	B2	Riddle Story of Devil	2:19	April 4, 2014	June 20, 2014	12	Diomedéa	Based on the manga series by Yun Kōga.
15	B1	Knights of Sidonia	1:49	April 11, 2014	June 27, 2014	12	Polygon Pictures	Based on the manga series by Tsutomu Nihei.
16	B1	Persona 4: The Golden Animation	1:49	July 11, 2014	September 26, 2014	12	A-1 Pictures	Based on the video game by Atlus.
17	B2	Black Butler: Book of Circus	2:19	July 11, 2014	September 12, 2014	10	A-1 Pictures	Based on the manga series by Yana Toboso.
18	B1	Gundam Reconguista in G	1:49	October 4, 2014	March 27, 2015	26	Sunrise	Based on the Gundam series by Hajime Yatate and Yoshiyuki Tomino.
19	B2	Yuki Yuna is a Hero	2:19	October 17, 2014	December 26, 2014	12	Studio Gokumi	Original work.
20	B2	Fafner in the Azure: -EXODUS-	2:19	January 9, 2015	April 4, 2015	13	Xebec; XEBECzwei	Sequel to Fafner in the Azure: Heaven and Earth.
21	B2	Food Wars: Shokugeki no Soma	2:40	April 4, 2015	September 26, 2015	24	J.C.Staff	Based on the manga series by Yūto Tsukuda.
22	B1	Knights of Sidonia: War of the Ninth Planet	2:10	April 11, 2015	June 27, 2015	12	Polygon Pictures	Sequel to Knights of Sidonia.
23	B1	Classroom Crisis	2:10	July 4, 2015	September 26, 2015	13	Lay-duce	Original work.
24	B1	K: Return of Kings	1:55	October 3, 2015	December 27, 2015	13	GoHands	Sequel to K: Missing Kings.
25	B2	Fafner in the Azure: -EXODUS- (Season 2)	2:25	October 3, 2015	December 27, 2015	13	Xebec; XEBECzwei	Sequel to Fafner in the Azure: -EXODUS-.
26	B2	Shouwa Genroku Rakugo Shinjuu	2:25	January 9, 2016	April 2, 2016	13	Studio Deen	Based on the manga series by Haruko Kumota.
27	B1	Ajin: Demi-Human	1:55	January 16, 2016	April 9, 2016	13	Polygon Pictures	Based on the manga series by Gamon Sakurai.
28	B1	The Lost Village	1:55	April 9, 2016	June 25, 2016	12	Diomedéa	Original work.
29	B2	Magi: Adventure of Sinbad	2:25	April 16, 2016	July 2, 2016	13	Lay-duce	Based on the manga series by Shinobu Ohtaka.
30	B1	91 Days	1:55	July 9, 2016	October 1, 2016	12	Shuka	Original work.
31	B2	Berserk (2016)	2:25	July 9, 2016	October 1, 2016	12	GEMBA; Millepensee	Based on the manga series by Kentaro Miura
32	B1	Haikyū!! Karasuno High School vs Shiratorizawa Academy	1:55	October 8, 2016	December 10, 2016	10	Production I.G	Based on the manga series by Haruichi Furudate.
33	B2	Ajin: Demi-Human (Season 2)	2:25	October 8, 2016	December 24, 2016	13	Polygon Pictures	Sequel to Ajin: Demi-Human.
34	B2	Descending Stories: Shouwa Genroku Rakugo Shinjuu	2:25	January 7, 2017	March 25, 2017	12	Studio Deen	Sequel to Descending Stories: Shouwa Genroku Rakugo Shinjuu.
35	B1	Blue Exorcist: Kyoto Saga	1:55	January 7, 2017	March 25, 2017	12	A-1 Pictures	Based on the manga series by Kazue Kato.
36	B1	Attack on Titan (Season 2)	1:55	April 1, 2017	June 17, 2017	12	Wit Studio	Based on the manga series by Hajime Isayama.
37	B2	Berserk (2016) (Season 2)	2:25	April 8, 2017	June 24, 2017	12	GEMBA; Millepensee	Sequel to Berserk (2016).
38	B1	Rage of Bahamut: Virgin Soul	1:55	April 8, 2017	September 30, 2017	24	MAPPA	Sequel to Rage of Bahamut: Genesis.
39	B2	Altair: A Record of Battles	2:25	July 8, 2017	December 23, 2017	24	MAPPA	Based on the manga series by Kotono Kato.
40	B1	Yuki Yuna is a Hero: Washio Sumi Chapter and Hero Chapter	1:55	October 7, 2017	January 6, 2018	13	Studio Gokumi	Prequel (Washio Sumi Chapter) and sequel (Hero Chapter) to Yuki Yuna is a Hero.
41	B1	Beatless	1:55	January 13, 2018	September 29, 2018	24	Diomedéa	Based on the novel by Satoshi Hase.
42	B2	Killing Bites	2:25	January 13, 2018	March 31, 2018	12	Liden Films	Based on the manga series by Shinya Murata.
43	B2	Magical Girl Site	2:25	April 7, 2018	June 23, 2018	12	Production doA	Based on the manga series by Kentarō Satō.
44	B1	Happy Sugar Life	1:55	July 14, 2018	September 29, 2018	12	Ezo'la	Based on the manga series by Tomiyaki Kagisora.
45	B2	Grand Blue Dreaming	2:25	July 14, 2018	September 29, 2018	12	Zero-G	Based on the manga series by Kenji Inoue.
46	B1	Boarding School Juliet	1:55	October 6, 2018	December 23, 2018	12	Liden Films	Based on the manga series by Yōsuke Kaneda.
47	B2	Iroduku: The World in Colors	2:25	October 6, 2018	December 30, 2018	13	P.A. Works	Original work.
48	B1	Domestic Girlfriend	1:55	January 12, 2019	March 30, 2019	12	Diomedéa	Based on the manga series by Kei Sasuga.
49	B2	Magical Girl Spec-Ops Asuka	2:25	January 12, 2019	March 39, 2019	12	Liden Films	Based on the manga series by Makoto Fukami.
50	B1	Senryu Girl	1:55	April 6, 2019	June 22, 2019	12	Connect	Based on the manga series by Masakuni Igarashi.
51	B1 (Note: Senryu Girl and Ao-Chan Can't Study are series that consist of 15-minute episodes. As such, they shared the B1 timeslot for the Spring 2019 season.)	Ao-chan Can't Study!	2:10	April 6, 2019	June 22, 2019	12	Silver Link	Based on the manga series by Ren Kawahara.
52	B2	Hitori Bocchi no Marumaru Seikatsu	2:25	April 6, 2019	June 22, 2019	12	C2C	Based on the manga series by Katsuwo.
53	SA (Note: Starting in July 2019, the block expanded to three time slots.)	Fire Force	1:25	July 6, 2019	December 28, 2019	24	David Production	Based on the manga series by Atsushi Ōkubo.
54	B1	Granbelm	1:55	July 6, 2019	September 27, 2019	13	Nexus	Original work.
55	B2	O Maidens in Your Savage Season	2:25	July 6, 2019	September 21, 2019	12	Lay-duce	Based on the manga series by Mari Okada.
56	B1	Case File nº221: Kabukicho	1:55	October 12, 2019	March 28, 2020	24	Production I.G	Original work.
57	B2	True Cooking Master Boy	2:25	October 12, 2019	December 28, 2019	12	Production I.G	Based on the manga series by Etsushi Ogawa.
58	SA	Haikyū!! To The Top	1:25	January 11, 2020	April 4, 2020	13	Production I.G	Sequel to Haikyū!! Karasuno High School vs Shiratorizawa Academy.
59	B2	Smile Down the Runway	2:25	January 11, 2020	March 28, 2020	12	Ezo'la	Based on the manga series by Kotoba Inoya.
60	B1	Listeners	1:55	April 4, 2020	June 20, 2020	12	MAPPA	Original work.
61	B2	Wave, Listen to Me!	2:25	April 4, 2020	June 20, 2020	12	Sunrise	Based on the manga series by Hiroaki Samura.
62	SA	Argonavis from BanG Dream!	1:25	April 11, 2020	July 4, 2020	13	Sanzigen	Based on a Japanese multimedia project by Bushiroad.
63	B1	Fire Force (Season 2)	1:55	July 4, 2020	December 12, 2020	24	David Production	Sequel to Fire Force.
64	SA	Rent-A-Girlfriend	1:25	July 11, 2020	September 26, 2020	12	TMS Entertainment	Based on the manga series by Reiji Miyajima.
65	SA (Note: Get Up! Get Live! is a five minute short that aired in the same timeslot after Rent-A-Girlfirend.)	Get Up! Get Live!	1:50	July 11, 2020	September 12, 2020	10	Spellbound	Original work.
66	SA	Jujutsu Kaisen	1:25	October 3, 2020	March 27, 2021	24	MAPPA	Based on the manga series by Gege Akutami.
67	SA (Note: With a Dog AND a Cat, Every Day is Fun is a five minute short that aired in the same timeslot after Jujutsu Kaisen.)	With a Dog AND a Cat, Every Day is Fun	1:50	October 3, 2020	March 27, 2021	24	Team Till Dawn	Based on the manga series by Hidekichi Matsumoto.
68	B2	Haikyū!! To The Top (Season 2)	2:25	October 3, 2020	December 19, 2020	12	Production I.G	Second cour of Haikyū!! To The Top.
69	B1	Project Scard: Scar on the Praeter	1:55	January 9, 2021	April 3, 2021	13	GoHands	Original work.
70	B2	The Hidden Dungeon Only I Can Enter	2:25	January 9, 2021	March 27, 2021	12	Okuruto Noboru	Based on the light novel series by Meguru Seto.
71	B2	Those Snow White Notes	2:25	April 3, 2021	June 19, 2021	12	Shin-Ei Animation	Based on the manga series by Marimo Ragawa.
72	SA	The World Ends with You: The Animation	1:25	April 10, 2021	June 26, 2021	12	Domerica; Shin-Ei Animation	Based on the video game by Square Enix.
73	SA (Note: Yuki Yuna is a Hero: Churutto! is a five minute short that aired in the same timeslot after The World Ends with You: The Animation.)	Yuki Yuna is a Hero: Churutto!	1:50	April 10, 2021	June 26, 2021	12	DMM.futureworks; W-Toon Studio	Based on the video game by AltPlus and Scopes.
74	B1	Blue Reflection Ray	1:55	April 10, 2021	September 25, 2021	24	J.C.Staff	Spin-off of the video game by Koei Tecmo.
75	SA	My Next Life as a Villainess: All Routes Lead to Doom! X	1:25	July 3, 2021	September 18, 2021	12	Silver Link	Sequel to My Next Life as a Villainess: All Routes Lead to Doom!.
76	SA (Note: Ore, Tsushima is a five minute short that aired in the same timeslot after My Next Life as a Villainess: All Routes Lead to Doom! X.)	Ore, Tsushima	1:50	July 3, 2021	September 18, 2021	12	Fanworks; Space Neko Company	Based on the manga series by Opūnokyōdai.
77	B2	Girlfriend, Girlfriend	2:25	July 3, 2021	September 18, 2021	12	Tezuka Productions	Based on the manga series by Hiroyuki.
78	SA	Blue Period	1:25	October 1, 2021	December 17, 2021	12	Seven Arcs	Based on the manga series by Tsubasa Yamaguchi.
79	SA (Note: "Deji" Meets Girl is a five minute short that aired in the same timeslot after Blue Period.)	"Deji" Meets Girl	1:50	October 1, 2021	December 17, 2021	12	Liden Films	Original work.
80	B1	Yuki Yuna is a Hero: The Great Mankai Chapter	1:55	October 1, 2021	December 17, 2021	12	Studio Gokumi	Sequel to Yuki Yuna is a Hero: Hero Chapter.
81	B2	Code Geass: Lelouch of the Rebellion	2:25	October 1, 2021	March 25, 2022	25	Sunrise	15th anniversary rebroadcast.
82	SA	Teasing Master Takagi-san (Season 3)	1:25	January 8, 2022	March 26, 2022	12	Shin-Ei Animation	Based on the manga series by Sōichirō Yamamoto. Sequel to Teasing Master Takagi-san 2.
83	B1	Cue!	1:55	January 8, 2022	June 25, 2022	24	Yumeta Company; Graphinica	Based on the mobile game by Liber Entertainment.
84	B2	Aharen-san Is Indecipherable	2:25	April 2, 2022	June 18, 2022	12	Felix Film	Based on the manga series by Asato Mizu.
85	SA (Note: Mahjong Soul Pong is a five minute short that aired in the same timeslot after Dance Dance Danseur.)	Mahjong Soul Pong	1:50	April 2, 2022	June 18, 2022	12	Scooter Films	Based on the mobile game by Cat Foot Studios.
86	SA	Dance Dance Danseur	1:25	April 9, 2022	June 18, 2022	11	MAPPA	Based on the manga series by George Asakura.
87	SA	Rent-A-Girlfriend (Season 2)	1:25	July 2, 2022	September 17, 2022	12	TMS Entertainment	Sequel to Rent-A-Girlfriend.
88	B1	Lucifer and the Biscuit Hammer	1:55	July 9, 2022	December 24, 2022	24	NAZ	Based on the manga series by Satoshi Mizukami.
89	B2	Code Geass: Lelouch of the Rebellion R2	2:25	July 9, 2022	December 31, 2022	25	Sunrise	Sequel to Code Geass: Lelouch of the Rebellion. 15th anniversary rebroadcast.
90	SA	Legend of Mana: The Teardrop Crystal	1:25	October 8, 2022	December 24, 2022	12	Yokohama Animation Laboratory; Graphinica	Based on the video game by Square Enix.
91	SA	Giant Beasts of Ars	1:25	January 7, 2023	March 25, 2023	12	Asahi Production	Original work.
92	B1	Endo and Kobayashi Live! The Latest on Tsundere Villainess Lieselotte	1:55	January 7, 2023	March 25, 2023	12	Tezuka Productions	Based on the light novel series by Suzu Enoshima.
93	B2	Mobile Suit Gundam: The Witch from Mercury	2:25	January 7, 2023	March 25, 2023	12	Sunrise	Rebroadcast of the first part.
94	SA	The Café Terrace and Its Goddesses	1:25	April 8, 2023	June 24, 2023	12	Tezuka Productions	Based on the manga series by Kōji Seo.
95	B1	Magical Destroyers	1:55	April 8, 2023	June 24, 2023	12	Bibury Animation Studios	Original work.
96	B2	Otaku Elf	2:25	April 8, 2023	June 24, 2023	12	C2C	Based on the manga series by Akihiko Higuchi.
97	SA	Rent-A-Girlfriend (Season 3)	1:23	July 8, 2023	September 30, 2023	12	TMS Entertainment	Sequel to Rent-A-Girlfriend 2nd Season.
98	SA (Note: Ikimono-san is a five minute short that aired in the same timeslot after Rent-A-Girlfriend 3rd Season.)	Ikimono-san	1:50	July 8, 2023	September 30, 2023	12	New Deer	Based on the short film and video game by Atsushi Wada.
99	B1	The Gene of AI	1:53	July 8, 2023	September 30, 2023	12	Madhouse	Based on the manga series by Kyūri Yamada.
100	B2	The Masterful Cat Is Depressed Again Today	2:23	July 8, 2023	September 30, 2023	13	GoHands	Based on the manga series by Hitsuji Yamada.
101	SA	Undead Unluck	1:23	October 7, 2023	March 23, 2024	24	David Production	Based on the manga series by Yoshifumi Tozuka.
102	B1	The Kingdoms of Ruin	1:53	October 7, 2023	December 23, 2023	12	Yokohama Animation Laboratory	Based on the manga series by yoruhashi.
103	B2	Girlfriend, Girlfriend (Season 2)	2:23	October 7, 2023	December 23, 2023	12	SynergySP	Sequel to Girlfriend, Girlfriend.
104	B1	Pon no Michi	1:53	January 6, 2024	March 23, 2024	12	OLM Team Inoue	Original work.
105	B2	Haikyu!! Otokoma Selection	2:23	January 6, 2024	June 22, 2024	25	Production I.G	Rebroadcast of various episodes of the series.
106	SAT (Note: Starting in April 2024, Super Animeism changed its name to Super Animeism Turbo.)	Wind Breaker	0:26	April 5, 2024	June 28, 2024	13	CloverWorks	Based on the manga series by Satoru Nii.
107	B1	Highspeed Etoile	1:53	April 6, 2024	June 22, 2024	12	Studio A-Cat	Original work.
108	SAT	The Café Terrace and Its Goddesses (Season 2)	0:26	July 5, 2024	September 20, 2024	12	Tezuka Productions	Sequel to The Café Terrace and Its Goddesses.
109	B1	Dungeon People	1:53	July 6, 2024	September 28, 2024	12	OLM Team Yoshioka	Based on the manga series by Sui Futami.
110	B2	Quality Assurance in Another World	2:23	July 6, 2024	September 28, 2024	13	100studio Studio Palette	Based on the manga series by Masamichi Sato.
111	SAT	Dandadan	0:26	October 4, 2024	December 20, 2024	12	Science Saru	Based on the manga series by Yukinobu Tatsu.
112	B1	The Stories of Girls Who Couldn't Be Magicians	1:53	October 5, 2024	December 21, 2024	12	J.C.Staff	Based on the novel series by Yuzuki Akasaka.
113	B2	Tōhai	2:23	October 4, 2024	April 5, 2025	25	East Fish Studio	Based on the manga series by Kōji Shinasaka.
114	SAT	From Bureaucrat to Villainess: Dad's Been Reincarnated!	0:26	January 10, 2025	March 28, 2025	12	Ajia-do	Based on the manga series by Michiro Ueyama.
115	B1	Welcome to Japan, Ms. Elf!	1:53	January 11, 2025	March 29, 2025	12	Zero-G	Based on the light novel series by Makishima Suzuki.
116	SAT	Wind Breaker (Season 2)	0:26	April 4, 2025	June 20, 2025	12	CloverWorks	Sequel to Wind Breaker.
117	B1	Fire Force (Season 3)	1:53	April 5, 2025	June 21, 2025	12	David Production	Sequel to Fire Force 2nd Season.
118	B2	Dandadan	2:23	April 12, 2025	June 28, 2025	12	Science Saru	Rebroadcast of the first season.
119	SAT	Dandadan (Season 2)	0:26	July 4, 2025	September 19, 2025	12	Science Saru	Sequel to Dandadan.
120	B1	Betrothed to My Sister's Ex	1:53	July 5, 2025	September 20, 2025	12	LandQ Studios	Based on the light novel series by Tobirano.
121	B2	Rent-A-Girlfriend (Season 4)	2:23	July 5, 2025	September 20, 2025	12	TMS Entertainment	Sequel to Rent-A-Girlfriend 3rd Season.
122	SAT	Dusk Beyond the End of the World	0:26	September 26, 2025	December 19, 2025	13	P.A. Works	Original work.
123	AI (Note: Starting in October 2025, the block is reduced to two timeslots.)	Sanda	1:53	October 4, 2025	December 20, 2025	12	Science Saru	Based on the manga series by Paru Itagaki.
124	SAT	Jujutsu Kaisen: The Culling Games (Season 3, Part 1)	0:26	January 9, 2026	March 27, 2026	12	MAPPA	Sequel to Jujutsu Kaisen 2nd Season.
125	AI	Fire Force (Season 3, Part 2)	1:53	January 10, 2026	April 4, 2026	13	David Production	Second cour of Fire Force 3rd Season. Series and season finale of Fire Force.
126	SAT	Kirio Fan Club	0:26	April 2, 2026	June 18, 2026	12	Satelight	Based on the manga series by Ponchan Chikyū No Osakana.
127	AI	Rent-A-Girlfriend (Season 5)	1:53	April 11, 2026	June 27, 2026	12	TMS Entertainment	Sequel to Rent-A-Girlfriend 4th Season.
128	SAT	The Exiled Heavy Knight Knows How to Game the System	0:26	July 3, 2026	December 2026	26	GoHands	Based on the light novel series by Nekoko.
129	AI	Code Geass: Rozé of the Recapture	1:53	July 11, 2026	September 26, 2026	12	Sunrise	Sequel to Code Geass: Lelouch of the Re;surrection.
130	AI	Tokyo Revengers: War of the Three Titans Arc	1:53 (Note: MBS and TBS aired at 1:23, while CBC retained the usual timeslot.)	October 3, 2026	TBA	TBA	Liden Films	Based on the manga series by Ken Wakui. Sequel to Tokyo Revengers: Tenjiku Arc.
TBA	SAT	Are You a Landmine, Chihara-san?	0:26	January 2027	TBA	TBA	SynergySP	Based on the manga series by Ryon.

== See also ==
- Animated programming blocks in Japan
- Other anime programming blocks by JNN
  - Nichi-5, airing on Sunday late afternoons/early evenings.
  - Agaru Anime, airing on Sunday nights.
