= List of Smile Down the Runway chapters =

Smile Down the Runway is a Japanese manga series written and illustrated by Kotoba Inoya. It was serialized in Kodansha's shōnen manga magazine Weekly Shōnen Magazine from May 31, 2017, to July 14, 2021. Kodansha has collected its chapters into individual tankōbon volumes. Twenty-two volumes were released from September 15, 2017, to August 17, 2021. Kodansha USA digitally published the manga in North America.

== Volumes ==
No.	Original release date	Original ISBN	English release date	English ISBN
1	September 15, 2017	978-4-06-510130-8	September 3, 2019	978-1-64-212998-4
1. "This Is Your Story" (これは君の物語, Kore wa kimi no monogatari); 2. "This Is My Story" (これは僕の物語, Kore wa boku no monogatari); 3. "A Promising Talent" (期待の逸材, Kitai no itsuzai); 4. "A Wannabe" (なりたがり, Narita gari); 5. "A Nobody" (何者でもない, Nanimono demonai)
2	November 17, 2017	978-4-06-510370-8	October 1, 2019	978-1-64-659098-8
6. "A Professional Place" (プロの現場, Puro no genba); 7. "It's Your Speciality, Right?" (得意でしょ？, Tokuidesho?); 8. "Tokyo Collection@Backstage/Ikuto Tsumura" (東京コレクション＠バックステージ/都村育人, Tōkyō Korekushon@Bakkusutēji/Tsumura Ikuto); 9. "Tokyo Collection@Audience/Fumiyo Niinuma" (東京コレクション＠オーディエンス 新沼文世, Tōkyō Korekushon@Ōdiensu/Nīnuma Fumiyo); 10. "Tokyo Collection@Runway/Chiyuki Fujito" (東京コレクション＠ランウェイ/藤戸千雪, Tōkyō Korekushon@Runway/Fujito Chiyuki); 11. "Tokyo Collection@Showtime/You Can't Smile on the Runway" (東京コレクション＠ショータイム/ランウェイじゃ笑っちゃいけない, Tōkyō Korekushon@ Shōtaimu/Runway ja waratcha ikenai); 12. "Tokyo Collection@Finale/Ikuto Tsumura & Chiyuki Fujito" (東京コレクション＠フィナーレ/都村育人＆藤戸千雪, Tōkyō Korekushon@Fināre/Tsumura Ikuto & Fujito Chiyuki); 13. "This Is the Day It All Begins" (今日が始まりの日, Kyō ga hajimari no hi); 14. "The Tsumura Family's Everyday Life" (都村家の日常, Tsumura no nichijō)
3	January 17, 2018	978-4-06-510758-4	November 5, 2019	978-1-64-659099-5
15. "Something Beyond Doing What You Love" (好きの先のなにか, Suki no saki no nani ka); 16. "A Story of Determination" (決意のお話, Ketsui no ohanashi); 17. "Simulation" (シミュレーション, Shimyurēshon); 18. "An Infinitely Expanding World" (無限に広がる世界, Mugen ni hirogaru sekai); 19. "The Moment" (瞬間, Shunkan); 20. "This Might Be Fun" (楽しくなりそう, Tanoshiku nari sō); 21. "The Qualities of Someone at the Top" (トップの資質, Toppu no shishitsu); 22. "Innate Talent" (天賦の才, Tenpunosai)
4	March 16, 2018	978-4-06-511073-7	December 3, 2019	978-1-64-659154-1
23. "Complex" (コンプレックス, Konpurekkusu); 24. "Being Selfish" (わがままなこと, Wagamamana koto); 25. "Kokoro's Emotional Support" (心の支え, Kokoro no sasae); 26. "The Determination of a Wimp" (弱虫の決意, Yowamushi no ketsui); 27. "Identity" (アイデンティティー, Aidentitī); 28. "Everyone's Own Style" (其々の流儀, Sorezore no ryūgi); 29. "Home Visit" (お宅訪問, Otaku hōmon); 30. "Equivalent Exchange" (等価交換, Tōka kōkan); 31. "Concept" (コンセプト, Konseputo)
5	May 17, 2018	978-4-06-511413-1	January 7, 2020	978-1-64-659196-1
32. "Believe in Yourself" (自分を信じろ, Jibun o shinjiro); 33. "Superiority and Inferiority" (優越感と劣等感, Yūetsukan to retsutōkan); 34. "A Tempting Offer" (甘美な誘い, Kanbina sasoi); 35. "Just a Moment" (Just a moment); 36. "My 'Merit'" (私の"利", Watashi no "ri"); 37. "Aura" (存在感, Sonzai-kan); 38. "A Treasure of the Industry" (業界の宝, Gyōkai no takara); 39. "An Adult's Job" (大人の仕事, Otona no shigoto); 40. "Aspirations, Talents, and Means" (憧れと才能と手段と, Akogare to sainō to shudan to)
6	August 17, 2018	978-4-06-511796-5	February 4, 2020	978-1-64-659224-1
41. "Encroaching Clutches" (忍び寄る魔の手, Shinobiyoru ma no te); 42. "What Do You Want to Be?" (君は何になりたいの？, Kimi wa nani ni naritai no?); 43. "A Hard Worker" (頑張り屋さん, Ganbari-ya-san); 44. "Priorities" (優先順位のお話, Yūsen jun'i no ohanashi); 45. "The Letter from Mom" (母からの手紙, Haha kara no tegami); 46. "Weighing Your Options" (天秤, Tenbin); 47. "The Best Answer" (最適解, Saiteki kai); 48. "A Well-Deserved Reward" (当然の報い, Tōzen no mukui); 49. "Like a Typhoon" (まるで台風, Marude Taifū); 50. "From Today, You're..." (今日から君は, Kyō kara kimi wa)
7	October 17, 2018	978-4-06-512997-5	March 3, 2020	978-1-64-659250-0
51. "I Must Go All Out" (本気でやらなきゃ, Honki de yaranakya); 52. "A Spiteful Personality" (嫌な性格, Iyana seikaku); 53. "Crush Them All" (ぶっ潰す, Buttsubusu); 54. "Time Flies" (タイムフライズ, Taimu Furaizu); 55. "Rivals" (ライバルたち, Raibaru-tachi); 56. "Prelude" (プレリュード, Pureryūdo); 57. "Through the Fire" (スルーザファイアー, Surū za Faiā); 58. "Winning or Losing" (勝ちも負けも, Kachi mo make mo); 59. "A Journey Around the World" (世界を旅する, Sekai o tabi suru)
8	December 17, 2018	978-4-06-513490-0	April 7, 2020	978-1-64-659279-1
60. "An Unyielding Spirit" (勝ち気, Kachiki); 61. "You Just Can't Help It" (仕方ないよね, Shikatanai yo ne); 62. "Designer and Model" (デザイナーとモデル, Dezainā to Moderu); 63. "Being Formal" (敬語, Keigo); 64. "First Time" (初めての, Hajimete no); 65. "Step by Step" (一歩一歩, Ippoippo); 66. "For You" (キミにアンタに, Kimi ni anta ni); 67. "Déjà vu" 68. "The Sound of Applause" (聴こえる, Kikoeru)
9	February 15, 2019	978-4-06-514129-8	May 5, 2020	978-1-64-659352-1
69. "It's Showtime!" (出陣, Shutsujin); 70. "In the Blink of an Eye" (瞬く, Matataku); 71. "Shining Light" (差し込む光, Sashikomu hikari); 72. "A Designer's Duty" (デザイナーの義務, Dezainā no gimu); 73. "E-mail" (メール, Mēru); 74. "Smile on the Shogi Board" (盤上で笑って, Banjō de waratte); 75. "Worry Notebook" (悩みノート, Nayami nōto); 76. "New Colleagues" (新しい仲間, Atarashī nakama); 77. "Internship" (インターン, Intān)
10	April 17, 2019	978-4-06-514887-7	June 2, 2020	978-1-64-659378-1
78. "Annoying First-Person Pronoun" (ムカつく一人称, Mukatsuku ichininshō); 79. "Aphro I Dite" (Aphro I dite); 80. "Parting Ways" (決別, Ketsubetsu); 81. "Rock Paper Scissors" (ジャンケン, Janken); 82. "Can't Back Down" (引けない, Hikenai); 83. "A Glimpse" (片鱗, Henrin); 84. "Surprise" (意外, Igai); 85. "At Least One Thing" (一つだけでも, Hitotsu dake demo); 86. "A Prank" (ドッキリ, Dokkiri)
11	July 17, 2019	978-4-06-515313-0	July 7, 2020	978-1-64-659584-6
87. "Pinky Promise" (指切り, Yubikiri); 88. "Aren't You Pissed Off?" (癪だろ？, Shakudaro?); 89. "The Beginning" (幕開け, Makuake); 90. "The Meaning of Promise" (ヤクソクの意味, Yakusoku no imi); 91. "What Will Make You Happy?" (満足ですか, Manzokudesu ka); 92. "Capsule Collection" (カプセルコレクション, Kapuseru Korekushon); 93. "Meddling" (ちょっかい, Chokkai); 94. "Paparazzi" (パパラッチ, Paparatchi); 95. "Jigsaw Puzzle" (ジグソーパズル, Jigusō Pazuru)
12	September 17, 2019	978-4-06-516792-2	August 4, 2020	978-1-64-659617-1
96. "New York" (ニューヨーク, Nyūyōku); 97. "One Day..." (いつかきっと, Itsuka kitto); 98. "Mode" (モード, Mōdo); 99. "That's a Wrap!" (撮影終わり, Satsuei owari); 100. "The Bad News" (悪い知らせ, Warui shirase); 101. "Thin Threads" (か細い糸, Kabosoi ito); 102. "A Doting Father" (親バカ, Oya baka); 103. "Mille Neige" (ミルネージュ, Miru Nēju); 104. "Face-Off" (VS.)
13	November 15, 2019	978-4-06-517360-2	September 1, 2020	978-1-64-659682-9
105. "What Goes On Behind One's Back" (背中越しの, Senaka-goshi no); 106. "Brand Name" (ブランド名, Burando-mei); 107. "I Doubt It" (ダウト, Dauto); 108. "All About Mii Sakuma" (佐久間美依について, Sakuma Mii ni tsuite); 109. "Co-star" (競演, Kyōen); 110. "Stylist" (スタイリスト, Sutairisuto); 111. "TGC"; 112. "Personal Feelings and Detours" (私情と遠回り, Shijō to tōmawari); 113. "Negotiation" (交渉, Kōshō)
14	January 17, 2020	978-4-06-517886-7	October 6, 2020	978-1-64-659743-7
114. "A Stylist's Pride" (スタイリストの矜持, Sutairisuto no kyōji); 115. "Retrospective" (回顧, Kaiko); 116. "Connection" (繋がる, Tsunagaru); 117. "A Good Mood" (調子いい, Chōshi ī); 118. "Something More Important" (そんなことよりも, Son'na koto yori mo); 119. "Currying Favor" (忖度, Sontaku); 120. "Starting Point" (きっかけは, Kikkake wa); 121. "Bloom or Wither" (咲くか枯れるか, Saku ka kareru ka)
15	March 17, 2020	978-4-06-518683-1	November 3, 2020	978-1-64-659788-8
122. "Muse" (女神, Megami); 123. "Oath" (誓い, Chikai); 124. "A Prince" (王子様, Ōji-sama); 125. "Spectacle" (情景, Jōkei); 126. "A Loose Screw" (頭のネジ, Atama no neji); 127. "Hypermodel" (ハイパーモデル, Haipāmoderu); 128. "Reckless" (無鉄砲, Muteppō); 129. "Dashing Light" (飛び出す光, Tobidasu hikari)
16	June 17, 2020	978-4-06-519182-8	December 1, 2020	978-1-64-659850-2
130. "The Frontiers" (最先端, Saisentan); 131. "Work Mode" (お仕事スイッチ, Oshigoto suitchi); 132. "Familiarity and Admiration" (親しみと憧れ, Shitashimi to akogare); 133. "Sales Target" (目標個数, Mokuhyō kosū); 134. "Immersion" (溶け込む, Tokekomu); 135. "A Good Model" (いいモデル, Ī Moderu); 136. "Good Luck" (相当な運, Sōtōna un); 137. "Pointless Thoughts" (雑念, Zatsunen); 138. "Not Here, Not Now" (ここじゃなかったや, Koko janakatta ya)
17	August 17, 2020	978-4-06-520447-4	January 5, 2021	978-1-64-659903-5
139. "Two Auras" (2つのオーラ, 2 tsu no ōra); 140. "Possession" (憑依る, Hyōiru); 141. "Presence" (存在感, Sonzai-kan); 142. "Three Questions" (3つの質問, 3 tsu no shitsumon); 143. "Social Media" (SNS); 144. "Home Stretch" (追い込み, Oikomi); 145. "Joint Exhibition" (合同展示会, Gōdō tenji kai); 146. "Flawless" (抜け目ない, Nukeme nai); 147. "Irony" (皮肉だね, Hinikuda ne)
18	November 17, 2020	978-4-06-521017-8	March 2, 2021	978-1-64-659994-3
148. "Successor" (後継者, Kōkei-sha); 149. "Proof" (証明, Shōmei); 150. "Evaluation" (反省会, Hansei-kai); 151. "Beyond the Door" (ドア越しの, Doa goshi no); 152. "No Longer Lonely" (1人じゃない, 1 ri janai); 153. "This Is Fun" (楽しいね, Tanoshīne); 154. "Gifted"; 155. "Yes" (イエス, Iesu); 156. "Fired" (クビ, Kubi)
19	January 15, 2021	978-4-06-521959-1	July 6, 2021	978-1-63-699215-0
157. "Silly Boy" (バカね, Bakane); 158. "Hug" (ハグ, Hagu); 159. "Going Independent" (独立へ, Dokuritsu e); 160. "Paris" (パリ, Pari); 161. "Patternmaker Candidates" (パタンナー候補, Patan'nā kōho); 162. "An Important Conversation" (大事な話, Daijina hanashi); 163. "Patternmaking Contest" (パターン勝負, Patān shōbu); 164. "Join My Team" (俺のチームに, Ore no Chīmu ni); 165. "My Show" (ウチのショー, Uchi no shō)
20	March 17, 2021	978-4-06-522518-9	September 7, 2021	978-1-63-699348-5
166. "Brand Name Announcement" (ブランド名発表, Burando mei happyō); 167. "A Bet" (ベット, Betto); 168. "Casting" (キャスティング, Kyasutingu); 169. "Preposterous" (心外, Shingai); 170. "I Don't Know" (わかんないです, Wakan'naidesu); 171. "Smile" (笑顔, Egao); 172. "Busy Days" (東奔西走, Tōhonseisō); 173. "A Done Deal" (決定事項, Kettei jikō); 174. "A Heartless Pronouncement" (非情な宣告, Hijōna senkoku)
21	May 17, 2021	978-4-06-523144-9	December 7, 2021	978-1-63-699509-0
175. "Don't Have to Anymore" (もう, Mō); 176. "Everything Will Be Fine" (全然大丈夫, Zenzen daijōbu); 177. "Façade of Strength" (強がり, Tsuyogari); 178. "Take Your Time and Tell Me Everything" (ゆっくり、全部, Yukkuri, zenbu); 179. "What I Want to Hear" (言ってほしい, Itte hoshī); 180. "The Only Way" (じゃないと, Janaito); 181. "Self-Loathing" (自己嫌悪, Jiko ken'o); 182. "Presentation" (提示, Teiji); 183. "Refrain" (リフレイン, Rifurein)
22	August 17, 2021	978-4-06-524026-7	March 1, 2022	978-1-63-699637-0
184. "The Road So Far" (これまでの, Kore made no); 185. "Mashiro Hanaoka's Battle" (花丘真白の勝負, Hanaoka Masshiro no shōbu); 186. "Side by Side" (横並び, Yokonarabi); 187. "Rivalry" (張り合い, Hariai); 188. "Signs" (兆し, Kizashi); 189. "For Sure..." (...だと思う, ...Da to omou); 190. "Gotta Keep My Promise" (約束守らないと, Yakusoku mamoranaito); 191. "The Main Star" (主役, Shuyaku); 192. "I Want to..." (わたしね, Watashi ne); 193. "Smile Down the Runway" (ランウェイで笑って, Runway de waratte); 194. "This Is Our Story" (これは2人の物語, Kore wa futari no monogatari)
