= My Exercise =

2020 video game

マイエクササイズ (Mai Ekusasaizu)
- Video game
- Developer: New Deer
- Publisher: Playables
- Produced by: Nobuaki Doi
- Engine: Unity
- Platform: iOS, Android, Microsoft Windows, mac, Linux (Steam, itch.io)
- Released: August 27, 2020
- Anime television series

Ikimono-san
- Directed by: Atsushi Wada
- Produced by: Hiroshi Kamei
- Written by: Atsushi Wada
- Music by: Kōji Takahashi
- Studio: Toei Animation (production); New Deer (animation)
- Original network: JNN (MBS, TBS), AT-X
- Original run: July 8, 2023 – September 30, 2023
- Episodes: 12

My Exercise (マイエクササイズ, Mai Ekusasaizu) is a Japanese video game created by Atsushi Wada and developed by New Deer. It was published by Playables on August 27, 2020. An anime television series adaptation titled Ikimono-san (いきものさん), produced by Toei Animation, animated by New Deer and directed by Atsushi Wada, aired on July 8, 2023, and September 30, 2023, on the Super Animeism block. The anime's theme song is "Mochimochi" by the pop band Nekosen.

== Characters ==
Igaguri (いがぐり)
Voiced by: Makoto (Yoneda 2000)
Dog (犬, Inu)
Voiced by: Norihiro Urai (Dansei Blanco)
