= Blue Period (manga) =

Japanese manga series

- First tankōbon volume cover, featuring Yatora Yaguchi

ブルーピリオド (Burū Piriodo)
- Genre: Coming-of-age; Drama
- Manga
- Written by: Tsubasa Yamaguchi
- Published by: Kodansha
- English publisher: NA: Kodansha USA
- Imprint: Afternoon KC
- Magazine: Monthly Afternoon
- Original run: June 24, 2017 – present
- Volumes: 19
- Anime television series
- Directed by: Koji Masunari (Note: Credited as Chief Director (総監督, Sō Kantoku).); Katsuya Asano
- Written by: Reiko Yoshida
- Music by: Ippei Inoue
- Studio: Seven Arcs
- Licensed by: Netflix (streaming rights)
- Original network: JNN (MBS, TBS)
- Original run: October 2, 2021 – December 18, 2021
- Episodes: 12
- Live-action film
- Directed by: Kentarō Hagiwara
- Written by: Reiko Yoshida
- Music by: Yaffle
- Studio: Warner Bros. Japan
- Released: August 9, 2024
- icon

Blue Period (Japanese: ブルーピリオド, Hepburn: Burū Piriodo) is a Japanese manga series written and illustrated by Tsubasa Yamaguchi. The series has been serialized in Kodansha's seinen manga magazine Monthly Afternoon since June 2017, with its chapters collected in 19 tankōbon volumes as of May 2026. The series is licensed in English by Kodansha USA. An anime television series adaptation produced by Seven Arcs aired from October to December 2021. A live-action film adaptation premiered in Japanese theaters in August 2024.

By December 2025, the manga had over 10 million copies in circulation. In 2020, Blue Period was awarded the 44th Kodansha Manga Award in the General category and the Grand Prize of the 13th Manga Taishō award.

== Premise ==
Yatora Yaguchi is a fairly popular student who excels in school, but secretly grapples with feelings of emptiness and frustration. After a night out with his friends, Yatora sees the morning scene of Shibuya in a shade of blue that awfully touches him. This feeling would inspire his first drawing for art class, which he normally viewed as a useless subject. However, later, when visiting his high school's art club and feeling passionate for something for the first time, Yatora decides to pursue art. He eventually aspires to attend the Tokyo University of the Arts (TUA) after he graduates from high school, the most prestigious public art university in Japan. The acceptance rate is extremely low, so to pass the entrance examination, Yatora must work very hard.

== Characters ==
Yatora Yaguchi (矢口 八虎, Yaguchi Yatora)
Voiced by: Hiromu Mineta (Japanese); Johnny Yong Bosch (English)
Portrayed by: Gordon Maeda
An academically gifted and diligent student whose friends are disinterested in school. After developing an interest in painting from his art club senior Mori, he is set down a path to attend art school.
Ryuji "Yuka" Ayukawa (鮎川 龍二, Ayukawa Ryuji)
Voiced by: Yumiri Hanamori (Japanese); Marcy Edwards (English)
Portrayed by: Fumiya Takahashi
Yatora's friend and fellow art-club member. Yuka considers themselves to be a non-conformist and indifferent to the opinions of others. They were born male, but present as a woman, with their gender identity being a point of contention. Throughout the series, they struggle with pressure, non-acceptance, and abuse from their family.
Yotasuke Takahashi (高橋 世田介, Takahashi Yotasuke)
Voiced by: Daiki Yamashita (Japanese); Daman Mills (English)
Portrayed by: Rihito Itagaki
Yatora's classmate in prep school. He is stoic and aloof towards Yatora, often sharply criticizing his work and character.
Haruka Hashida (橋田 悠, Hashida Haruka)
Voiced by: Kengo Kawanishi (Japanese); Todd Haberkorn (English)
Portrayed by: Ikuho Akiya
Yatora's classmate in prep school. Hashida dresses well and takes a very classical and theoretical approach to art, which shows in his work.
Maki Kuwana (桑名 マキ, Kuwana Maki)
Voiced by: Yume Miyamoto (Japanese); Erica Lindbeck (English)
Portrayed by: Sena Nakajima
Another of Yatora's classmates from prep school. Her entire family attended TUA, and as a result she often struggles with feelings of inadequacy, despite being a highly talented artist in her own right.
Maru Mori (森 まる, Mori Maru)
Voiced by: Mayu Aoyagi (Japanese); Triya Leong (English)
Portrayed by: Hiyori Sakurada
Yatora's senior in his high school art club. To Mori art is a spiritual activity, and her pieces often incorporate images of religion and prayer. It is one of her works that spurs Yatora's interest in art.
Masako Saeki (佐伯 昌子, Saeki Masako)
Voiced by: Fumi Hirano (Japanese); Anne Yatco (English)
Portrayed by: Hiroko Yakushimaru
The art teacher at Yatora's high school. She is his first art teacher and guides his first steps of him improving his artistic ability.
Mayu Oba (大葉 真由, Ōba Mayu)
Voiced by: Yuki Kazu (Japanese); Julia McIlvaine (English)
Portrayed by: Noriko Eguchi
Yatora's teacher at prep school. She continually provides Yatora with valuable criticism and advice on how to overcome personal and technical obstacles as he continues with art.
Sumida (純田)
Voiced by: Masaya Fukunishi (Japanese); Adin Rudd (English)
A friend of Yatora's from high school. He performs poorly in school and has a keen interest in sports. He is shown to care deeply about his friends.
Koigakubo (恋ケ窪)
Voiced by: Shinichiro Kamio (Japanese); Chris Tergliafera (English)
Voiced by: Katsumi Hyodo
A friend of Yatora's from high school. He is tall, quiet, and intimidating on the outside, but over time reveals his sensitivity, dreams, and emotional character to Yatora.
Utashima (歌島)
Voiced by: Tatsumaru Tachibana (Japanese); Griffin Burns (English)
Another of Yatora's friends from high school. He does not apply himself academically but is very interested in girls and highly devoted to his friends.
Takuro Ishii (石井 啄郎, Ishii Takurō)
Voiced by: Taishi Murata (Japanese); Griffin Burns (English)
Yatora's classmate at prep school.
Sae Okada (岡田 さえ, Okada Sae)
Voiced by: Emiri Suyama (Japanese); Kayli Mills (English)
Yatora's classmate at prep school.
Hanako Sakuraba (桜庭 華子, Sakuraba Hanako)
Voiced by: Saori Ōnishi (Japanese); Amanda Celine Miller (English)
Yatora's classmate at prep school. She always wears her school uniform to prep school, which is revealed to be to save money.
Umino (海野)
Voiced by: Miku Hiratsuka (Japanese); Jenny Yokobori (English)
A member of Yatora's high school art club.
Shirai (白井)
Voiced by: Ikumi Hasegawa (Japanese); Amber Lee Connors (English)
A member of Yatora's high school art club.
Shirota (城田)
Voiced by: Yuna Nemoto (Japanese); Kayli Mills (English)
A member of Yatora's high school art club.
Yamamoto (山本)
Voiced by: Aoi Koga (Japanese); Erica Lindbeck (English)

== Media ==
=== Manga ===
Blue Period is written and illustrated by Tsubasa Yamaguchi. The series began in Kodansha's seinen manga magazine Monthly Afternoon on June 24, 2017. Kodansha has collected its chapters into individual tankōbon volumes. The first volume was released on December 22, 2017. As of May 22, 2026, nineteen volumes have been released.

In North America, Kodansha USA announced the print release of the manga in November 2019.

==== Volumes ====
No.	Original release date	Original ISBN	English release date	English ISBN
1	December 22, 2017	978-4-06-510586-3	October 6, 2020 (digital); October 13, 2020 (print)	978-1-64659-837-3 (digital); 978-1-64651-112-9 (print)
1. "Awakening to the Joy of Painting" (絵を描く悦(よろこ)びに目覚めてみた, E o Egaku Yorokobi ni Mezamete Mita); 2. "Meaningful Time" (有意義な時間, Yūigina Jikan); 3. "He's Not Tanned At All" (全然焼けてねえ, Zenzen Yakete nē); 4. "You're No God" (マジ神じゃない, Majishin Janai)
2	March 23, 2018	978-4-06-511124-6	January 5, 2021	978-1-64659-986-8 (digital); 978-1-64651-124-2 (print)
5. "Prep School Debut of the Dead" (予備校デビュー・オブ・ザ・デッド, Yobikō Debyū Obu Za Deddo); 6. "Surprisingly Pure?!" (逆にピュアかッ, Gyaku ni Pyua ka); 7. "Where Will We Go?" (我々はどこへ行くのか, Wareware wa Doko e Iku no ka); 8. "Exam Piece" (受験絵画, Juken Kaiga)
3	August 23, 2018	978-4-06-512336-2	April 27, 2021 (digital); May 18, 2021 (print)	978-1-63699-075-0 (digital); 978-1-64651-125-9 (print)
9. "I Know What to Do, I Just Don't Know If I Can Do It" (課題が見えてもどうしようもねぇ, Kadai ga Miete mo Dō Shiyō monē); 10. "I Can't Even Say What I Want To with This Art" (言いたいことも言えないこんな絵じゃ, Ītai Koto mo Ienai Konna E ja); 11. "You Have Encountered Praise" (褒められが発生しました, Homerarega Hassei Shimashita); 12. "Thanks for Being a Jerk" (イキリ乙(おつ), Ikiri Otsu)
4	February 22, 2019	978-4-06-514484-8	August 17, 2021	978-1-63699-114-6 (digital); 978-1-64651-126-6 (print)
13. "Mental Breakdowns Are No Joke" (メンブレ半端ないって, Menbure Hanpa Nai tte); 14. "The Ability to Have Fun" (楽しんじゃう力, Tanoshinjau Chikara); 15. "The First Exam Begins" (1次試験開始, Ichiji Shiken Kaishi); 16. "Brain Juice Bushaa" (脳汁ブシャー, Nōjiru Bushā)
5	June 21, 2019	978-4-06-515958-3	November 30, 2021	978-1-63699-179-5 (digital); 978-1-64651-127-3 (print)
17. "Real Messed Up" (ほんまにキモいわ, Honma ni Kimo Iwa); 18. "Wandering Knife" (さまようナイフ, Samayō Naifu); 19. "Not Like You" (らしくねーよ, Rashikunēyo); 20. "Our Blue" (俺たちの青い色, Oretachi no Aoi Iro); 21. "An Unexpected Enemy Attacks" (まさかの敵、襲来。, Masakano Teki, Shūrai.); Bonus: "Art School Entrance Exam Meals" (美大受験メシ, Bidai Juken Meshi)
6	November 22, 2019	978-4-06-517512-5	February 15, 2022 (digital); March 22, 2022 (print)	978-1-63699-180-1 (digital); 978-1-64651-128-0 (print)
22. "The Second Exam Begins" (2次試験開始, Niji Shiken Kaishi); 23. "Now the Second Exam Begins" (こっから2次試験開始, Kokkara Niji Shiken Kaishi); 24. "Coming into Your Own" (色づき始めた自分, Irozuki Hajimeta Jibun); 25. "No Regrets" (後悔はない, Kōkai wa Nai)
7	March 23, 2020	978-4-06-518889-7	May 31, 2022 (digital); June 28, 2022 (print)	978-1-63699-189-4 (digital); 978-1-64651-291-1 (print)
26. "Tua Life: Day One" (藝大ライフ1日目, Gei Dai Raifu Ichi Nichime); 27. "Baptism" (洗礼, Senrei); 28. "Wallop" (ガツーン, Gatsūn); 29. "I Don't Have Anything, Do I...?" (俺、なくね…?, Ore, Naku ne...?)
8	September 23, 2020	978-4-06-520727-7; 978-4-06-520725-3 (SE)	July 26, 2022 (digital); August 23, 2022 (print)	978-1-63699-190-0 (digital); 978-1-64651-292-8 (print)
30. "Can't Judge a Book By Its Cover" (食わず嫌いアカン, Kuwazugirai Akan); 31. "Shibuya Wasn't Built in a Day" (渋谷は一日にしてならず, Shibuya wa Ichi Nichi ni Shite Narazu); 32. "Festival Prep Begins" (祭りの準備開始, Matsuri no Junbi Kaishi); 33. "Spirit of Self-Sacrifice" (ジコギセイ精神, Jikogisei Seishin); Bonus: "A Delicious Sketch Excursion" (おいしい写生旅行, Oishī Shasei Ryokō)
9	January 21, 2021	978-4-06-521994-2	August 16, 2022 (digital); September 20, 2022 (print)	978-1-68491-324-4 (digital); 978-1-64651-395-6 (print)
34. "It's a Sign of Happy Events to Come" (これは慶事の前触れだ!, Kore wa Keiji no Maebureda!); 35. "An Artless...Summer" (何も描けなくて…夏, Nani mo Egakenakute... Natsu); 36. "Hello, World!" (ハロー! ワールド, Harō! Wārudo); 37. "Armor-clad Venus" (鎧を着たヴィーナス, Yoroi o Kita Vīnasu); 38. "Talent and Hard Work" (才能と努力, Sainō to Doryoku)
10	May 21, 2021	978-4-06-523175-3	November 8, 2022	978-1-68491-681-8 (digital); 978-1-64651-396-3 (print)
39. "Insulted and Injured" (踏まれたり蹴られたり, Fumare tari Kerare tari); 40. "I'm Just Too Good At Unintentionally Pushing My Friend's Buttons" (気がついたら友達の地雷を踏んでいる俺のスキルが優秀すぎる, Kigatsuitara Tomodachi no Jirai o Fundeiru Ore no Sukiru ga Yūshūsugiru); 41. "My Friend Is Just Too Good At Unintentionally Pushing My Buttons" (気がついたら俺の地雷を踏んでいる友達のスキルが優秀すぎる, Kigatsuitara Ore no Jirai o Fundeiru Tomodachi no Sukiru ga Yūshūsugiru); 42. "Art Doesn't Lie" (絵は嘘をつかない, E wa Uso o Tsukanai)
11	September 22, 2021	978-4-06-524669-6; 978-4-06-524977-2 (SE)	November 22, 2022 (digital); November 29, 2022 (print)	978-1-68491-742-6 (digital); 978-1-64651-566-0 (print)
43. "Why, Why, Why" (なんでなんでなんで, Nande Nande Nande); 44. "Is It All Right If I Reexamine Myself for Now" (とりあえず自分を見直させてもらっていいですか, Toriaezu Jibun o Minaosa Sete Moratte Īdesu ka); 45. "Please Let Me Keep Loving You" (ずっと好きでいさせてください, Zutto Sukide i Sasete Kudasai); 46. "A Certain Grade-Schooler Wants to Work Hard to Be Happy" (とある小学生は努力して幸せになりたい, Toaru Shōgakusei wa Doryoku Shite Shiawase ni Naritai); 47. "Shaky Brush Tip" (ゆれる筆先, Yureru Fudesaki)
12	May 23, 2022	978-4-06-527418-7	January 24, 2023	978-1-68491-869-0 (digital); 978-1-64651-567-7 (print)
48. "My Least Favorite Food Is Ketchup Spaghetti" (嫌いな食べ物はナポリタン, Kiraina Tabemono wa Naporitan); 49. "Where's the Walkthrough Site That'll Show Me How to Beat This Deathloop of Worry" (悩みのデスループをクリアできる攻略サイトはどこですか, Nayami no Desurūpu o Kuria Dekiru Kōryaku Saito wa Dokodesu ka); 50. "One of Those Situations Where I Took the Heat and Kept My Cool" (熱にあてられると逆に冷静になっちゃうアレ, Netsu ni Ate Rareruto Gyaku ni Reisei ni Nacchau Are); 51. "Stray 2.0: Student Edition" (迷走2.0アカデミーパック, Meisō Ni.Zero Akademīpakku); 52. "When the Ground Softens, You Quickly Get Stuck" (地盤が弱るとすぐ沼る, Jiban ga Yowaruto Sugu Numaru)
13	November 22, 2022	978-4-06-529730-8	May 30, 2023	979-8-88933-016-5 (digital); 978-1-64651-685-8 (print)
53. "Is There Such Thing as Righteousness?" ("正しさ"って実際あんの?, "Tadashi-sa" tte Jissai Anno?); 54. "The Game Is Set On Nightmare Mode, Isn't It?" (鬼畜ゲーすぎんだろ, Kichiku Gē Sugi Ndaro); 55. "Summer Break (PG Version) 1" (夏休み (全年齢版) ①, Natsuyasumi (Zen Nenrei-ban) 1); 56. "Summer Break (PG Version) 2" (夏休み (全年齢版) ②, Natsuyasumi (Zen Nenrei-ban) 2)
14	July 21, 2023	978-4-06-531943-7	March 26, 2024	979-8-88933-534-4 (digital); 978-1-64651-686-5 (print)
57. "Summer Break (PG Version) 3" (夏休み (全年齢版) ③, Natsuyasumi (Zen Nenrei-ban) 3); 58. "Summer Break (PG Version) 4" (夏休み (全年齢版) ④, Natsuyasumi (Zen Nenrei-ban) 4); 59. "Summer Break (PG Version) 5" (夏休み (全年齢版) ⑤, Natsuyasumi (Zen Nenrei-ban) 5); 60. "Summer Break (PG Version) 6" (夏休み (全年齢版) ⑥, Natsuyasumi (Zen Nenrei-ban) 6); 61. "Summer Break (PG Version) 7" (夏休み (全年齢版) ⑦, Natsuyasumi (Zen Nenrei-ban) 7)
15	November 22, 2023	978-4-06-533571-0	August 20, 2024 (digital); October 22, 2024 (print)	979-8-89478-035-1 (digital); 979-8-88877-029-0 (print)
62. "Summer Break (PG Version) 8" (夏休み (全年齢版) ⑧, Natsuyasumi (Zen Nenrei-ban) 8); 63. "Summer Break (PG Version) 9" (夏休み (全年齢版) ⑨, Natsuyasumi (Zen Nenrei-ban) 9); 64. "Summer Break (PG Version) 10" (夏休み (全年齢版) ⑩, Natsuyasumi (Zen Nenrei-ban) 10); 65. "Summer Break (PG Version) 11" (夏休み (全年齢版) ⑪, Natsuyasumi (Zen Nenrei-ban) 11)
16	November 21, 2024	978-4-06-537474-0	November 11, 2025	979-8-89478-746-6 (digital); 979-8-88877-569-1 (print)
66. "I Logged into Life After Receiving an Award" (コンクールに入賞したら人生にログインしました。, Konkūru ni Nyūshō Shitara Jinsei ni Roguin Shimashita.); 67. "Chemical Reaction"; 68. "Battling Through the Night" (夜に足(あ)掻(が)く, Yoru ni Agaku); 69. "Remember the Three C's of Communication!" (ほうれんそう大事!, Hōrensō Daiji!); 70. "Air-ism" (エアイズム, Earizumu)
17	May 22, 2025	978-4-06-539411-3	February 3, 2026	979-8-89478-870-8 (digital); 979-8-88877-746-6 (print)
71. "Kabukicho Training Diary: Finale" (歌舞伎町育成日記完, Kabukichō Ikusei Nikki Kan); 72. "Don't Push, Don't Run, Don't Give Up On Your Dreams" (お・か・ゆの精神, O Ka Yu no Seishin); 73. "A Reunion Is the Start of Something New" (再会は何かの始まり, Saikai wa Nanika no Hajimari); 74. "Gather Round, Art Club's Mori!" (あつまれ美術部の森, Atsumare Bijutsubu no Mori); 75. "That Person and I Are On Parallel Paths" (あの人とはパラレル, Ano Hito to wa Parareru)
18	November 21, 2025	978-4-06-541429-3	December 1, 2026	979-8-88877-981-1 (print)
76. "That Lost Feeling" (途方に暮れる感情, Tohō ni Kureru Kanjō); 77. "Milestone"; 78. "Blooming In an Empty Shell" (抜け殻に咲く, Nukegara ni Saku); 79. "Conquer Cart!" (コビケンを攻略せよ, Kobiken o Kōryaku Seyo); 80. "Thoughts Like Drifting Mist" (霞たなびく思ひ, Kasumitana Biku Omohi)
19	May 22, 2026	978-4-06-543549-6	—	—
81. "Cart Day 1" (コビケンDay1, Kobiken Dē 1); 82. "Cart Day 2" (コビケンDay2, Kobiken Dē 2); 83. "Cart Day 3" (コビケンDay3, Kobiken Dē 3); 84. "Cart Day 4" (コビケンDay4, Kobiken Dē 4); 85. "Maze Before Dawn" (夜明け前の迷路, Yoake Mae no Meiro)
20	December 22, 2026	978-4-06-546043-6	—	—

==== Chapters not yet in tankōbon format ====
- 86. "As the World Glitches" (世界、バグる。, Sekai, Baguru.)
- 87. "No Longer the Same As Yesterday" (昨日までと違う, Kinō Made to Chigau)
- 88. "The Screaming Canvas" (叫ぶキャンパス, Sakebu Kyanpasu)
- 89. "The Moon and the Sun" (月と太陽, Tsuki to Taiyō)
- 90. "A Journey That Puts an End to Excuses" (言い訳の終わる旅, Īwake no Owaru Tabi)
- 91. "How We Innocents Survive" (無実な俺らの生存戦略, Mujitsuna Orera no Seizon Senryaku)

=== Anime ===
An anime television series adaptation was announced on January 19, 2021. Seven Arcs is animating the series, with Koji Masunari serving as chief director, and Katsuya Asano serving as director, with scripts by Reiko Yoshida, character designs by Tomoyuki Shitaya, and music by Ippei Inoue. While the series had an advanced streaming debut on Netflix on September 25, 2021, it aired on television from October 2 to December 18 of the same year on the Super Animeism block on MBS, TBS and other channels. (Note: MBS and TBS list the series premiere at 25:25 on October 1, 2021, which is effectively 1:25 a.m. JST on October 2.) Netflix is streaming the series on a weekly schedule outside of Japan since October 9, 2021. Omoinotake performed the opening theme "Everblue", while Mol-74 performed the ending theme "Replica".

==== Episodes ====
No.	Title	Directed by (Note: Information is taken from the ending credits of each episode.)	Storyboarded by	Original release date (Note: Episodes released on Netflix Japan a week before their original air date.)
1	"Awakening to the Joy of Painting"; Transliteration: "E o Kaku Yorokobi ni Mezamete Mita" (Japanese: 絵を描く悦びに目覚めてみた)	Juria Matsumura	Koji Masunari	October 2, 2021
2	"He's Not Tanned At All"; Transliteration: "Zenzen Yakete nē" (Japanese: 全然焼けてねえ)	Yūsuke Onoda	Katsuya Asano	October 9, 2021
3	"Prep School Debut of the Dead"; Transliteration: "Yobikō Debyū Obu Za Deddo" (Japanese: 予備校デビュー・オブ・ザ・デッド)	Shigeru Fukase	Tsutomu Miyazawa	October 16, 2021 (Note: This episode aired at 1:40 a.m. JST, 15 minutes after the original air time.)
4	"Where Are We Headed?"; Transliteration: "Wareware wa Doko e Iku no ka" (Japanese: 我々はどこへ行くのか)	Hiromitsu Hagiwara	Yasunori Ide	October 23, 2021
5	"Helpless Even If I Know What To Do"; Transliteration: "Kadai ga Miete mo Dō Shiyō mo nē" (Japanese: 課題が見えてもどうしようもねぇ)	Shigeru Yamazaki	Hiroaki Tomita	October 30, 2021
6	"Serious Mental Breakdown"; Transliteration: "Menbure Hanpa Naitte" (Japanese: メンブレ半端ないって)	Ryūta Kawahara	Ryūta Kawahara	November 6, 2021
7	"The Start of the First Exam"; Transliteration: "Ichiji Shiken Kaishi" (Japanese: 1次試験開始)	Yūsuke Onoda	Gōichi Iwahata	November 13, 2021
8	"Brain-Racking"; Transliteration: "Nōjiru Bushā" (Japanese: 脳汁ブシャー)	Masatoyo Takada	Masatoyo Takada	November 20, 2021
9	"Wandering Knife"; Transliteration: "Samayou Naifu" (Japanese: さまようナイフ)	Daisuke Kurose	Hiroaki Tomita	November 27, 2021
10	"Our Color Blue"; Transliteration: "Oretachi no Aoi Iro" (Japanese: 俺たちの青い色)	Shūjirō Ami	Shūjirō Ami	December 4, 2021
11	"The Start of the Second Exam"; Transliteration: "Niji Shiken Kaishi" (Japanese: 2次試験開始)	Kuniyasu Nishina	Yasunori Ide	December 11, 2021
12	"When I Started to be Dyed in Color"; Transliteration: "Irozuki Hajimeta Jibun" (Japanese: 色づき始めた自分)	Shin'ichi Fukumoto	Koji Masunari	December 18, 2021

=== Stage play ===
In November 2021, it was announced by Kodansha that a stage play of the manga would run at the Galaxy Theatre in Tokyo. It was directed by Kaori Miura, written by Masafumi Hata, and starred Kurumu Okamiya as Yatora Yaguchi. Other cast members included Natsuki Ōsaki, Shōgo Tazuru, Karin Takahashi, Asumi Kikuchi, Sayaka Okamura, Yūta Tachibana, Hayato, Ikuma Miyagi, and Dai Hosho. It ran from March 25 to April 3, 2022.

=== Film ===
A live-action film adaptation was announced on April 2, 2024. The film is directed by Kentarō Hagiwara, with scripts written by Reiko Yoshida, and music composed by Yaffle. It premiered in Japanese theaters on August 9, 2024, with Gordon Maeda starring as Yatora.

== Reception ==
By November 2021, the manga had over 4.5 million copies in circulation; by December 2025, the manga had over 10 million copies in circulation. Volume 14 was Kodansha's 12th highest first print run manga volume of 2023–2024 (period from April 2023–March 2024), with 145,000 copies printed.

Blue Period was one of the Jury Recommended Works at the 22nd and 24th Japan Media Arts Festival in 2019 and 2021, respectively. In 2019, the manga was nominated for the 12th Manga Taishō and the 43rd Kodansha Manga Award for Best General Manga. In 2020, the manga won the 13th Manga Taishō and the 44th Kodansha Manga Award for Best General Manga. It was also nominated for the 24th Tezuka Osamu Cultural Prize.

The series ranked fourth on Takarajimasha's Kono Manga ga Sugoi! list of best manga of 2019 for male readers, 14th, along with The Fable on the 2020 list; and 15th, along with Longing for Home on the 2021 list. Blue Period ranked 16th on the 2019 "Book of the Year" list by Da Vinci magazine; it ranked 19th on the 2020 list; and 24th on the 2021 list. The series was also one of twelve manga series to make the 2021 Young Adult Library Services Association's top 126 graphic novels for teenagers list.

Rebecca Silverman from Anime News Network gave the first volume a B+. She praised its coming-of-age narrative and characters (specifically the adults), while criticizing it for being too informative at times.
