= Happy Sugar Life =

Japanese manga and anime series

- First tankōbon volume cover, featuring Satō Matsuzaka

ハッピーシュガーライフ (Happī Shugā Raifu)
- Genre: Psychological horror; Psychological thriller; Yuri
- Manga
- Written by: Tomiyaki Kagisora
- Published by: Square Enix
- English publisher: NA: Yen Press
- Imprint: GC Joker
- Magazine: Gangan Joker
- Original run: May 22, 2015 – June 22, 2019
- Volumes: 11
- Anime television series
- Directed by: Keizō Kusakawa (Note: Credited as Chief Director (総監督, Sō Kantoku)); Nobuyoshi Nagayama
- Produced by: Hiroshi Kamei; Shōta Komatsu; Ryūtarō Ei (Note: Unconfirmed romanization 榮龍太朗.); Sachie Abe (Note: Unconfirmed romanization of 安部幸枝.)
- Written by: Touko Machida
- Music by: Kōichirō Kameyama
- Studio: Ezóla (Note: Collaboration between Diomedéa and Studio Blanc.)
- Licensed by: Amazon Prime Video (expired)
- Original network: JNN (MBS, TBS, BS-TBS), AT-X
- Original run: July 14, 2018 – September 29, 2018
- Episodes: 12
- icon

Happy Sugar Life (Japanese: ハッピーシュガーライフ, Hepburn: Happī Shugā Raifu) is a Japanese manga series written and illustrated by Tomiyaki Kagisora. It was serialized in Square Enix's shōnen manga magazine Gangan Joker from May 2015 to June 2019. The series is licensed by Yen Press. An anime television series adaptation by Ezóla aired during the Animeism programming block from July to September 2018.

== Plot ==
The series is centered on high school girl Satō Matsuzaka who befriends a mysterious little girl named Shio, who was abandoned by her mother, and immediately becomes highly attached to Satō. They both agree to live together in Satō's apartment, and the former vows to protect that feeling of love, even if it means committing crimes or even killing people.

== Characters ==
Satō Matsuzaka (松坂 さとう, Matsuzaka Satō)
Voiced by: Kana Hanazawa
Satō is a teenage girl who comes to love Shio and keeps her in her apartment. She maintains a kind facade in public in order to earn money for her and Shio, but will resort to anything in order to protect Shio. She is a first-year high school student at Makiko High School and also works at a cosplay restaurant called Cure á Cute as a waitress in order to support both Shio and herself.
Shio Kōbe (神戸 しお, Kōbe Shio)
Voiced by: Misaki Kuno
An innocent little girl who lives at Satō's apartment. She cares for Satō deeply, but often remains unaware of what she is involved in until later episodes, since Satō doesn't allow her outside of their apartment; she is later revealed to be Asahi's younger sister. In the final episode, she sustains minor injuries and ended up in the hospital after hugging Satō while pushing them off their apartment roof, with Satō dying from the fall. After Satō's death, Shio keeps Sato's wedding ring and her hair ribbon as a memento to remember her; she also claims that she has been reborn as Satō, much to Asahi's horrific shock, and believes that Satō will be reborn in the future.
Asahi Kōbe (神戸 あさひ, Kōbe Asahi)
Voiced by: Yumiri Hanamori
A boy who is searching for the whereabouts of Shio. He is later revealed to be Shio's older brother; it is hinted that he had romantic feelings for Shōko after she had stolen his first kiss, and then becomes traumatized and devastated when he finds Shōko's corpse in the fire. In the final episode, he is shown visiting his sister Shio in the hospital with a bouquet of flowers.
Taiyō Mitsuboshi (三星 太陽, Mitsuboshi Taiyō)
Voiced by: Natsuki Hanae
A high school boy who works alongside Satō at a family restaurant. Being held captive and raped by his former boss causes him to develop a great fear of older women. First laying eyes on a flyer of Shio's disappearance makes him find comfort in Shio's innocence and he becomes obsessed with her. In the manga's final chapter, Taiyo is implied to have returned to a regular life albeit with his obsession continuing as a psychological crutch. In the anime's final episode, Taiyo became emotionally broken due to being raped by Satō's aunt and being led to believe that Shio died from the fire; it is implied that he since has adopted a reclusive lifestyle.
Shōko Hida (飛騨 しょうこ, Hida Shōko)
Voiced by: Aya Suzaki
Satō's best friend and co-worker who comes from a rich family. She is killed by Satō after discovering her secret relationship with Shio. Her body is eventually burned in the final episode, though the police manage to identify her and arrest Satō's aunt as a result.
Daichi Kitaumekawa (北埋川 大地, Kitaumekawa Daichi)
Voiced by: Kaito Ishikawa
Satō's high school teacher. Underneath his handsome looks and friendly personality, he is revealed to be a pervert with sadomasochistic tendencies who is obsessed with Satō, hinting that he has a crush on her. Threatened to have this revealed to his family, he is forced to dispose of some evidence for Satō. In the final episode, he is taken by the police to be questioned for the crimes he committed.
Satō's aunt
Voiced by: Kikuko Inoue
An unnamed relative of Satō who had taken full custody of her after her parents died many years ago. It was thought that she may have been killed by her own niece since she was mostly shown in flashback sequences when Satō was a child. However, it is revealed that she is alive, apart from a few parts of her body which are seen covered in bandages. Despite her happy and cheery nature, she is mentally unstable as well as being deeply insane, and accepts all forms of desires towards her with disturbing masochistic pleasure. Her deeply twisted views of love are responsible for molding Satō into the deranged psychopath that she is today. She lives in the same apartment complex as her niece, but on a different room floor. In the final episode, she is arrested for arson and first-degree murder of Satō and Shōko (even though Satō was the one responsible for Shōko's death).
Sumire Miyazaki (宮崎 スミレ, Miyazaki Sumire)
Voiced by: Larissa Tago Takeda
Satō's next-door neighbor and co-worker who refers to her as "senpai"; she holds romantic feelings towards her. Just like Satō, Shōko, & Taiyo, she attends a different school. During the final episode, after hearing about Satō's death on the news channel, Sumire is seen deeply crushed and upset by this, to the point where she drops her school bag on the floor in shock.
Yūna Kōbe (神戸 ゆうな, Kōbe Yūna)
Voiced by: Yūko Gotō
Asahi and Shio's mother. Originally a kind-hearted woman, she was forced to marry a man she did not love after she was raped and impregnated with her two children while she was in high school; she is featured in the flashbacks of her children and in her backstory. It is hinted that she suffered from borderline personality disorder mostly due to the domestic abuse that she had suffered from her husband, who later died from alcohol poisoning, but it is later learned towards the end of the series that she had poisoned her husband. In the final episode, she is shown standing outside of the hospital that her daughter, Shio, is being treated at.

== Media ==
=== Manga ===
Written and illustrated by Tomiyaki Kagisora, Happy Sugar Life started in Square Enix's shōnen manga magazine Gangan Joker on May 22, 2015. Eleven tankōbon volumes of the manga were released from October 22, 2015, to June 22, 2022. The series ended in the June 22, 2019 issue of Gangan Joker, with the ninth and tenth volumes of the manga releasing on July 22, 2019. On July 8, 2018, during their panel at Anime Expo, Yen Press announced that they had licensed the manga.

==== Volumes ====
No.	Original release date	Original ISBN	English release date	English ISBN
1	October 22, 2015	978-4-7575-4769-8	May 21, 2019	978-1-9753-0330-3
1st Life: "The Sugar Girl Eats Up Love"; 2nd Life: "Something So Sweet and Something So Bitter"; 3rd Life: "Shio's Miniature Garden"; 4th Life: "The Long Monochrome Night I"
2	December 22, 2015	978-4-7575-4839-8	September 3, 2019	978-1-9753-0331-0
5th Life: "The Long Monochrome Night II"; 6th Life: "The Long Monochrome Night III"; 7th Life: "The Long Monochrome Night IV"; Protolife: "White Sugar Garden, Black Salt Cage."
3	May 21, 2016	978-4-7575-4986-9	December 3, 2019	978-1-9753-0332-7
8th Life: "Unnoticed by the Sugar Girl"; 9th Life: "The Sugar Girl's Raw Ingredients"; 10th Life: "The Taste of Sin"; 11th Life: "The Flavor of Punishment"
4	November 22, 2016	978-4-7575-5158-9	February 18, 2020	978-1-9753-0333-4
12th Life: "The Changed Story of the Girl"; 13th Life: "The Changing Story of the Girl"; 14th Life: "We Revolve Around the Moon"; 15th Life: "If We're Already Crossing That Line"; 16th Life: "In the Box Garden"; 17th Life: "May You Also Have Love's Divine Protection"
5	May 22, 2017	978-4-7575-5350-7	May 26, 2020	978-1-9753-0334-1
18th Life: "The Boy's Decision"; 19th Life: "Room 1208"; 20th Life: "Its Beginning"; 21st Life: "Wavering Thread"; 22nd Life: "Future"; 23rd Life: "Melting Rain"
6	August 22, 2017	978-4-7575-5452-8	October 27, 2020	978-1-9753-0335-8
24th Life: "Where the Light Is"; 25th Life: "The Imperfect Girls"; 26th Life: "Castle of Two"; 27th Life: "Proposal Under the Stars"; -Interlude-: "sweet salt"; -Interlude-: "bitter sugar"
7	March 22, 2018	978-4-7575-5580-8	December 8, 2020	978-1-9753-0336-5
28th Life: "My Completely Ordinary Life I"; 29th Life: "My Completely Ordinary Life II"; Parallel Life: "The Sweet, the Twisted, the Pained"; 30th Life: "My Completely Ordinary Life III"; Parallel Life: "Then, in the Cold Rain"; 31st Life: "In the Jar, One Drop of Love"
8	June 22, 2018	978-4-7575-5755-0	March 9, 2021	978-1-9753-0337-2
32nd Life: "The End of the Dream, the Start of Today"; 33rd Life: "Noisy"; 34th Life: "Daybreak and the Boy"; 35th Life: "Pandora's Box"; 36th Life: "Love Connected"; 37th Life: "A Moment with You, Forever."
9	July 22, 2019	978-4-7575-6190-8	June 1, 2021	978-1-9753-2466-7
38th Life: "His Wish"; 39th Life: "Friendship"; 40th Life: "The Unmotherly Mother"; 41st Life: "The Connecting Thread"; 42nd Life: "The Ring and the Promise"; 43rd Life: "The Sullied Angel"
10	July 22, 2019	978-4-7575-6191-5	November 9, 2021	978-1-9753-2469-8
44th Life: "Mayhem"; 45th Life: "What Shio Kobe Is Made Of"; 46th Life: "I"; 47th Life: "The Temperature of Happiness"; Last Life: "Happy Sugar Life"
11	June 22, 2022	978-4-7575-7971-2	—	—

=== Anime ===
The anime television series adaptation was directed by Keizō Kusakawa and Nobuyoshi Nagayama and written by Touko Machida, with animation by studio Ezóla. Shōko Yasuda provided the character designs.

Youko Matsubara was the color key artist for the series and Kiyotaka Yachi directed the background art. Yasuyuki Itou served as director of photography, while Yayoi Tateishi was the sound director. The series was edited by Yuuji Oka. Koichiro Kameyama composed the series' music. The opening theme song, "One Room Sugar Life" (ワンルームシュガーライフ, Wan Rūmu Shugā Raifu) was performed by Akari Nanawo, while the ending theme song, "Sweet Hurt", was performed by Reona.

The 12-episode series aired in Japan from July 14 to September 29, 2018, (Note: MBS listed the series premiere on July 13, 2018 at 25:55, which is July 14 at 1:55 a.m.) broadcasting during the Animeism programming block on MBS, TBS, BS-TBS, and AT-X. The series was simulcasted exclusively on Amazon Prime Video worldwide.

==== Episodes ====
No.	Title (Note: All English titles are taken from Amazon.)	Original release date
1	"The Sugar Girl Eats Love"; Transliteration: "Satō Shōjo wa Ai o Hamu" (Japanese: 砂糖少女は愛を食む)	July 14, 2018
The episode begins with two young girls standing on the roof of a burning building while agreeing to contemplate suicide together. Satou Matsuzaka, who previously had a reputation for playing around with men, has started living with the person she loves: a little girl named Shio Koube. As Satou takes on a part-time waitressing job at a restaurant called Princess Imperial to raise money for Shio's sake, she turns down a love confession from fellow employee Taiyou Mitsuboshi, who stops coming to work the next day. As Satou is forced to work overtime for less pay, she confronts the manager and goads her into admitting that she kidnapped and raped Taiyo. Upon revealing the confession has been recorded on her cell phone, Satou blackmails the manager into paying her withheld wages. While Satou returns home to Shio, keeping quiet about a room in their apartment containing bloodied trash bags, a boy named Asahi puts up posters listing Shio as missing.
2	"Shio's Miniature Garden"; Transliteration: "Shio no Hakoniwa" (Japanese: しおの箱庭)	July 21, 2018
Upon getting the feeling that someone is watching her, Satou deduces that her school teacher, Daichi Kitaumekawa, is the one stalking her, narrowly managing to avoid being assaulted. The next morning, Satou threatens to expose Kitaumekawa's deeds to his family, coercing him into disposing of some unwanted evidence for her. Later, Taiyou, who has begun harboring an obsession with Shio after seeing her poster, comes across Asahi being beaten up and takes him to Satou's workplace. Hearing Asahi murmur the same "marriage vow" that Shio does with her every night, Satou contemplates killing him.
3	"A Long Monochromatic Night"; Transliteration: "Monokurōmu no Nagai Yoru" (Japanese: モノクロームの長い夜)	July 28, 2018
After barely managing to resist the urge to kill Asahi and letting him go, Satou is shocked to find Shio has ventured outside the apartment in search for her. Following the figment of a figure she can't remember, Shio is found by Taiyou, who feels her innocence can purify his tainted body. Taiyou attempts to bring Shio home with him but is attacked out by the thugs he saved Asahi from.
4	"The Sugar Girl Doesn't Notice"; Transliteration: "Satō Shōjo wa Kizukanai" (Japanese: 砂糖少女は気づかない)	August 4, 2018
After Shio passes out from experiencing frightening visions of her mother, Satou arrives on the scene and brutally kills the thugs before taking Shio back to their apartment. As Taiyou, who had witnessed Satou run off with Shio, becomes curious about her motives, one of Satou's co-workers, Sumire Miyazaki, is seen sniffing Satou's uniform.
5	"The Taste of Crime and the Taste of Punishment"; Transliteration: "Tsumi no Aji, Batsu no Aji" (Japanese: 罪の味、罰の味)	August 11, 2018
Satou discovers that Sumire has been going through her locker, learning that she is obsessed with becoming just like her. When probed about where she lives, Satou kisses Sumire to stop her prying further. Upon returning home, Satou discovers Shio in turmoil over memories of her mother, feeling it is punishment for lying about not talking to anyone. Satou, who feels guilty about telling someone else she loved them, confesses her "crime" to Shio, and the two manage to calm each other down. Meanwhile, Satou's friend Shouko Hida goes to Taiyo's house and discovers his obsession with Shio, who he claims Satou has kidnapped. While in disbelief over what Taiyou has told her, Shouko is approached by Asahi.
6	"We Revolve Around the Moon"; Transliteration: "Watashi-tachi wa, Tsuki no Mawari o Mawatteiru" (Japanese: 私達は、月の周りを回っている)	August 18, 2018
As Shouko starts to grow suspicious of Satou, she starts visiting Asahi on a regular basis to make sure he is fed. While speaking with Shouko about his search for Shio, Asahi recalls the hardships he went through to keep Shio and their mother safe from their abusive father. The next day, Shouko asks Satou to tell her the truth, to which Satou decides to take her to her place. Meanwhile, Kitaumekawa, who is convinced that Satou killed her aunt, decides to follow after her.
7	"What the Sugar Girl is Made Out Of"; Transliteration: "Satō Shōjo no Genzairyō" (Japanese: 砂糖少女の原材料)	August 25, 2018
Feeling that Satou betrayed him by sharing her secret with someone else, Kitaumekawa calls over the police to her apartment just as she and Shouko arrive. To his surprise, however, the door is answered by Satou's aunt herself. Despite this person's disturbing behavior towards them, the police find nothing incriminating inside the apartment, which is later revealed to be a different one from the one Satou and Shio are living in.
8	"Apartment No.1208"; Transliteration: "Ichi-Ni-Zero-Hachi Gōshitsu" (Japanese: 1208号室)	September 1, 2018
Flashing back; Satou recalls the first time she came to Apartment 1208, wanting to get away from her aunt while serving as a model for the owner's painting as thanks for giving her shelter from the rain. One day, as Satou found Shio on the way home from school and brought her to the apartment, the owner, angered by Satou's change in expression (as she was satisfied and he liked her when she was incomplete) attempted to kill Shio, only to be killed by Satou instead. This is what left the blood splatter on the wall in the back room. His cut-up body is what Satou made Kitaumekawa dispose of in episode two. Back in the present, Asahi gives Shouko encouragement following her experience with Satou's aunt, while Satou offers Taiyo an opportunity to see Shio if he leads Asahi out of town.
9	"Dissolving Rain"; Transliteration: "Yūkai Rein" (Japanese: 融解レイン)	September 8, 2018
Taiyo tries to convince Asahi to leave town by giving him Shio's tie that he had received from Satou. Despite warnings from Shouko not to trust Taiyo, Asahi decides to go as it is the only clue he has of his sister. The next day, as Satou and Shio make plans to have a wedding together, they are spotted by Shouko as she takes a picture of them with her cellphone. Unable to trust that she won't tell the police about Shio, Satou kills Shouko by slitting her throat, unaware that she had managed to send the photo she took earlier to Asahi.
10	"A Proposal Under a Starry Sky"; Transliteration: "Hoshizora no Puropōzu" (Japanese: 星空のプロポーズ)	September 15, 2018
While trying to clean up the apartment for an exhausted Satou following Shouko's death, Shio recalls how her mother gradually went crazy from her husband's constant abuse and eventually abandoned her. Satou found her soon after. When Satou mentions they'll have to abandon their apartment, Shio lashes out at her over the secrets she kept from her, telling Satou she hates her. Recalling how they first met, Shio states she wants to protect Satou like she protects her, leading Satou to become honest about the sins she has committed and work together with Shio.
11	"An Eternal Moment with You."; Transliteration: "Eien no Isshun o, Anata to." (Japanese: 永遠の一瞬を、貴方と。)	September 22, 2018
Asahi confronts Taiyou about the photo Shouko sent him, ordering him to find Satou's address. Meanwhile, Satou reluctantly asks for her aunt's help in disposing of Shouko's body and providing a getaway for her and Shio. Hoping to have Shio to himself, Taiyou goes to the address listed in Satou's work profile, only to wind up at her aunt's apartment instead. She is revealed to be a child predator and thinks he's here for love, leading her to rape him twice while laughing hysterically. The episode ends with Satou and Shio having a wedding ceremony in their apartment and sharing a kiss with each other.
12	"Happy Sugar Life"; Transliteration: "Happī Shugā Raifu" (Japanese: ハッピーシュガーライフ)	September 29, 2018
After packing up their belongings, Satou and Shio purchase their airplane tickets to leave the city; however Satou notices that she left her wedding ring back at the apartment so they go back to retrieve it. As Satou and Shio are about to leave the apartment together, they are confronted by Asahi, who had figured out their address from Shouko's photo. Satou first takes Shio to her aunt's apartment, but runs into a crazed Taiyou, who has freed himself and is escaping. They leave him to fall to the ground and go to the roof. Meanwhile, her aunt – also crazed – had set the entire 12th floor of the apartment ablaze and when Asahi goes to Satou's burning apartment, he finds Shouko dead inside. He finally confronts them on the roof, revealing to Shio their mother abandoned her so she would be away from her, having hit Shio and feared she was becoming like her husband. Then their mother poisoned their father. However, Shio remains determined to stay with Satou and die along with her. The two leap off the rooftop together. In the end, Satou dies protecting Shio, who keeps the love she had for her inside her, while Satou's aunt is arrested for arson and Shouko's murder. Taiyou is back home in a catatonic state after losing his "angel." Kitaumekawa is arrested, the information he was abusing students somehow leaked. Asahi visits Shio in the hospital, who is looking out the window at their mother, standing on the street looking back at her. Shio refuses her brother and states her love exists only inside her where the memory of Satou is, much to his horror. Shio looks happily at Satou's wedding ring and reflects on her sacrifice, wondering why she'd let her live, before stating they'll always be together forever, closing it with her own words: "This is my happy sugar life."

== Reception ==
In 2017, the series was ranked thirteenth at the third Next Manga Awards in the print category.
