= Derick Snow =

American voice actor

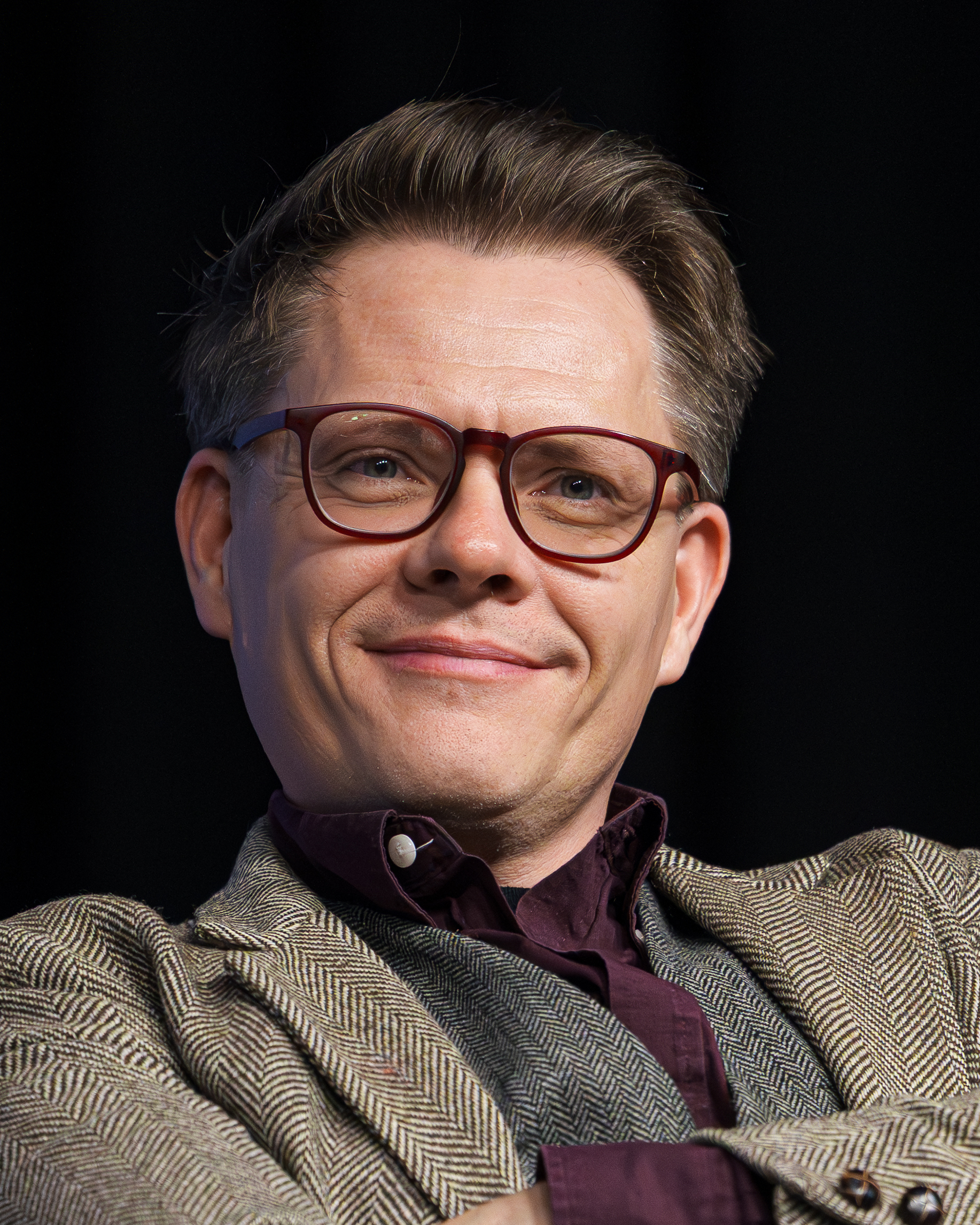
- Snow at GalaxyCon Oklahoma City in 2026
- Born: August 25; Missouri, U.S.
- Occupation: Voice actor
- Years active: 2000–present
- Website: dericksnow.com

Derick Snow is an American voice actor. Inspired by the work of other actors, Snow eventually began a career in acting in 2000. In 2014, he began voice acting in anime. Some of his noteworthy roles include Hermes in Kino's Journey, Yukitoshi Shimizu in Arifureta, Shinra Kusakabe in Fire Force, Ikuto Tsumura in Smile Down the Runway, and Nagara in Sonny Boy.

== Biography ==
Snow was born in Missouri on August 25 and grew up in Utqiagvik, Alaska. While growing up, Snow was a fan of voice actor Noel Blanc. In 2000, Snow began performing in various musical theater performances. In order to combine these passions, Snow later decided to move to Dallas, an area he had previously done commercial work in. In 2016, Snow began voice acting and singing in anime with his first role being Kei Kamatori in No-Rin.

== Filmography ==
=== Anime ===
List of voice performances in anime
Year	Title	Role	Notes	Source
2016	No-Rin	Kei Kamatori		
2016	Tales of Zestiria the X	Prince Konan		
2016	Touken Ranbu: Hanamaru	Yagen Toushirou		
2016	Izetta: The Last Witch	Rickert		
2016	All Out!!	Mikami		
2017	Hand Shakers	Tomoki		
2017	Dragon Ball Super	Roh, Rabanra		
2017	Akashic Records of Bastard Magic Instructor	Bix		
2017	Dance with Devils	Loewen		
2017	A Centaur's Life	Chidori Hyappo		
2017	Tsuredure Children	Takao Yamane		
2017	Kino's Journey	Hermes		
2017	Star Blazers: Space Battleship Yamato 2199	Kimihiko Kamo		
2017	D.Gray-man	Shifu		
2018	Tokyo Ghoul:re	Yuma		
2018	Angels of Death	Danny		
2018	Free!: Dive to the Future	Suzuki		
2018	That Time I Got Reincarnated as a Slime	Rigur		
2018	Black Clover	Rill Boismortier		
2018	A Certain Magical Index III	Kouyagi, Krans R. Tsarskiy		
2018	Radiant	Mister Boobrie		
2019	Boogiepop and Others	Additional Voices	Episode "Boogiepop and Others I"	
2019	Fire Force	Shinra Kusakabe		
2019	Arifureta: From Commonplace to World's Strongest	Yukitoshi Shimizu		
2019	Fairy Tail	Wall Eehto		
2019	Kochoki	Maeda Toshiie		
2019	My Hero Academia	Mimic		
2019	Stars Align	Itsuki Ameno		
2020	Bofuri	Shin		
2020	Smile Down the Runway	Ikuto Tsumura		
2020	Plunderer	Nikola		
2021	Moriarty the Patriot	Wiggins, Concertina Boy		
2021	Sonny Boy	Nagara		
2022	The Prince of Tennis	Eiji Kikumaru		
2022	Blue Lock	Jinpachi Ego	also Season 2	
2022	More Than a Married Couple, But Not Lovers	Kamo		
2022	PuraOre! Pride of Orange	Additional voices		
2023	Chainsaw Man	Beam		
2023	Vinland Saga	Fox	Crunchyroll dub	
2023	The Ancient Magus' Bride	Isaac Fowler		
2023	Dead Mount Death Play	Arase		
2024	Metallic Rouge	Ramen Waiter		
2024	Kaiju No. 8	Mizoguchi		
2024	Wind Breaker	Chōji Tomiyama		
2024	Shy Season 2	Doki		
2024	Delico's Nursery	Dali Delico		
2025	Zenshu	QJ		
2025	Failure Frame	Shougo Oyamada		
2025	Let This Grieving Soul Retire!	Gilbert		
2026	Daemons of the Shadow Realm	Yamashina		

=== Films ===
List of voice performances in films
Year	Title	Role	Notes	Source
2018	The Life of Budori Gusuko	Budori Gusuko		
2018	This Boy Suffers from Crystallization	Ono		
2019	One Piece: Stampede	Morgans		
