= Are You Lost? =

Japanese manga series

- First tankōbon volume cover, featuring Mutsu Amatani (left) and Homare Onishima (right)

ソウナンですか？ (Sōnan desu ka?)
- Genre: Survival
- Manga
- Written by: Kentarō Okamoto
- Illustrated by: Riri Sagara
- Published by: Kodansha
- English publisher: NA: Kodansha USA; (digital)
- Magazine: Weekly Young Magazine
- Original run: January 7, 2017 – March 7, 2022
- Volumes: 10
- Anime television series
- Directed by: Nobuyoshi Nagayama
- Written by: Touko Machida
- Music by: Akiyuki Tateyama
- Studio: Ezóla (Note: Collaboration between Diomedéa and Studio Blanc.)
- Licensed by: Crunchyroll (streaming): SA / SEA: Medialink
- Original network: Tokyo MX, MBS, BS-NTV
- Original run: July 2, 2019 – September 17, 2019
- Episodes: 12
- icon

Are You Lost? (Japanese: ソウナンですか？, Hepburn: Sōnan desu ka?; "Are We Shipwrecked?" (Note: A play on the phrase sō nan desu ka? (そうなんですか？, "Is that so?"))) is a Japanese manga series written by Kentarō Okamoto and illustrated by Riri Sagara. It was serialized in Kodansha's seinen manga magazine Weekly Young Magazine from January 2017 to March 2022. Kodansha published ten tankōbon volumes. Kodansha USA digitally published the manga in North America. An anime television series adaptation by Ezóla aired in Japan from July to September 2019.

== Premise ==
When their plane crashes during a school trip, four high school girls, Homare Onishima, Asuka Suzumori, Mutsu Amatani, and Shion Kujo, find themselves stranded on a remote island. Using the survival skills she picked up from her father, Homare helps the others to survive island life as they try to make the best of their situation.

== Characters ==
Homare Onishima (鬼島 ほまれ, Onishima Homare)
Voiced by: M.A.O
A solemn school girl. Having had survival training with her father as a child, she has a bevy of knowledge on how to survive in critical conditions. As a result, Homare takes the role as the leader among the girls and teaches them how to survive on the island.
Asuka Suzumori (鈴森 明日香, Suzumori Asuka)
Voiced by: Hiyori Kono
A cheery and athletic girl who is a member of the basketball and track clubs. As the most physically fit among the girls, Asuka often accompanies Homare when they hunt or fish for food.
Mutsu Amatani (天谷 睦, Amatani Mutsu)
Voiced by: Kiyono Yasuno
A shy and intelligent girl who enjoys reading light novels and wants to become a yaoi writer in the future. As noted by Homare, Mutsu's intelligence and adaptability makes her most suited to survive in the wilderness. She takes the role as the cook among the girls.
Shion Kujo (九条 紫音, Kujō Shion)
Voiced by: Azumi Waki
A rich, spoiled girl. Shion is the most dexterous among the girls and is skilled with crafts. Many of the girls' actions are inspired by her childish demands. She has a dog at home named Arnold and plays the piano.
Joichi Onishima (鬼島 丈一, Onishima Jōichi)
Voiced by: Akio Otsuka
Homare's father, who taught her everything she knows about survival. He seeks out to rescue Homare and her friends after hearing of the plane crash.
Rui Torii (鳥居 累, Torii Rui)
A female student who also survived the plane crash. However, she is separated from Homare and her friends, as she is located on the other side of the island.
Soji Hattori (服部 宗二, Hattori Sōji)
A male student who also survived the plane crash. He is located on the other side of the island alongside Rui.
Homare's Mother (ほまれの母, Homare no haha)
A kind and gentle woman who died when Homare was a child.

== Media ==
=== Manga ===
Written by Kentarō Okamoto and illustrated by Riri Sagara, Are You Lost? was serialized in Kodansha's seinen manga magazine Weekly Young Magazine from January 7, 2017, to March 7, 2022. Kodansha published ten tankōbon volumes from August 4, 2017, to April 6, 2022.

Kodansha USA has licensed the manga in North America, who digitally published it in English from October 2, 2018, to October 18, 2022.

==== Volumes ====
No.	Original release date	Original ISBN	English release date	English ISBN
1	August 4, 2017	978-4-06-510070-7	October 2, 2018	978-1-64-212491-0
1. "Crash" (墜落, Tsuiraku); 2. "Drifting" (漂流, Hyōryū); 3. "Desert Island" (無人島, Mujintō); 4. "Water" (水分, Suibun); 5. "Their First Meal" (初めての食事, Hajimete no Shokuji); 6. "Asuka is Hungry" (アスカは空腹, Asuka wa Kūfuku); 7. "Shion is a Spoiled Girl" (しおんはお嬢様, Shion wa Ojōsama); 8. "Mutsu is a Hard Worker" (むつは頑張り屋, Mutsu wa Ganbariya); 9. "Let's Go Trapping" (トラップ（罠猟）しよう, Torappu (Wanaryō) Shiyō); 10. "Tasty Rabbit? ①" (ウサギおいし？（1）, Usagi Oishi? (1)); 11. "Tasty Rabbit? ②" (ウサギおいし？（2）, Usagi Oishi? (2)); 12. "The Strange Horned Turban Shells" (奇妙なサザエ, Kimyōna Sazae); 13. "Tasty Rabbit? ③" (ウサギおいし？（3）, Usagi Oishi? (3)); 14. "Homare's Surprise" (ほまれのサプライズ, Homare no Sapuraizu)
2	March 6, 2018	978-4-06-510862-8	November 20, 2018	978-1-64-212492-7
15. "We Must!!" (やるしかない！！, Yaru Shikanai!!); 16. "What to Do with the Rabbit?" (捕らえたウサギどうする？, Toraeta Usagi Dō Suru?); 17. "A Taste of Rabbit" (ウサギ実食, Usagi Jisshoku); 18. "The Second Rain" (二度目の雨, Futatabime no Ame); 19. "UV Rays are Bothering Them" (紫外線が気になる, Shigaisen ga Kiniaru); 20. "Exploring the Island I" (島を探索にI, Shima o Tansaku ni I); 21. "Exploring the Island II" (島を探索にII, Shima o Tansaku ni II); 22. "Exploring the Island III" (島を探索にIII, Shima o Tansaku ni III); 23. "On the Other Side" (反対側にて, Hantaisoku Nite); 24. "Rui and Soji" (累と宗二, Rui to Sōji); 25. "Homare and Daddy" (ほまれとパパ, Homare to Papa); 26. "The Island Calendar" (島のカレンダー, Shima no Karendā); 27. "For Shion-sama's Sake" (しおん様のためなら, Shion-sama no Tamenara); 28. "Delicacy in Survival Situations" (サバイバル環境下でのデリカシー, Sabaibaru Kankyō-ka de no Derikashī)
3	October 5, 2018	978-4-06-513151-0	December 4, 2018	978-1-64-212493-4
29. "Let's Make a Roof" (屋根を作ろう, Yane o tsukurou); 30. "Honey Bee" (Note: Stylized in all caps); 31. "How to Spend a Rainy Day" (雨の日の暇つぶし, Ame no Hi no Himatsubushi); 32. "We've Got No Food!!" (食べものがない！！, Tabemono ga nai!!); 33. "The Boar's Territory" (イノシシのナワバリへ, Inoshishi no Nawabari e); 34. "Sea on Side"; 35. "I'll Save Her No Matter What!" (絶対助ける！, Zettai Tasukeru!); 36. "Where's Shion?!" (しおんはどこだ！？, Shion wa Dokoda!?); 37. "Welcome Home" (おかえり, Okaeri); 38. "Checking the Traps" (トラップ見回り, Torappu Mimawari); 39. "The Hard-Luck Man" (ついてない男, Tsuitenai Otoko); 40. "Born Under a Stranded Star" (遭難する星のもと, Sōnan Suru Hoshi no Moto); 41. "We'll Do It Ourselves!!" (あたしたちでやってやる！！, Atashi-tachi de Yatte Yaru!!); 42. "Sorry I'm Late" (遅れてごめんね, Okurete Gomen ne)
4	March 6, 2019	978-4-06-514802-0	June 18, 2019	978-1-64-212914-4
43. "Pierce Its Heart" (心臓をつらぬいて, Shinzō o Tsuranuite); 44. "You Acquired a Boar!" (イノシシを手に入れた！, Inoshishi o Teniireta!); 45. "Let's Eat Some Meat!" (肉を食う！, Nikuwokuu!); 46. "Not Them" (ふたりに限って, Futari ni Kagitte); 47. "In Search of Treasure" (お宝を求めて, Otakara o Motomete); 48. "Near Miss" (ニアミス, Niamisu); 49. "I'll Be Fine" (私なら大丈夫, Watashinara Daijōbu); 50. "Even Without Homare" (ほまれがいなくても, Homare ga Inakute mo); 51. "The Loner's Side" (おひとり様side, Ohitorisama Saido); 52. "I Want to be with You" (お前といたいんだよ, Omae to Itai nda yo); 53. "I Miss Sashimi" (おさしみ食べたい, Osashimi Tabetai); 54. "Shark Attack" (シャーク・アタック, Shāku Atakku)
5	September 6, 2019	978-4-06-516984-1; 978-4-06-516988-9 (SE)	December 17, 2019	978-1-64-659168-8
55. "Mutsu's Diary" (むつの日記帳, Mutsu no Nikki-chō); 56. "Scatter, Scatter, Mature" (散る散る満ちる, Chiru Chiru Michiru); 57. "Tight Squeeze Quartet" (密着カルテット, Mitchaku Karutetto!); 58. "Ghost in the Well"; 59. "Mucchan Pulls Out All the Stops" (むっちゃんがんばる, Mutchan Ganbaru); 60. "Operation: Save Homare!!" (ほまれ救出作戦!!, Homare Kyūshutsu Sakusen!!); 61. "Shion Learned Rope Work!!" (しおんはロープワークを覚えた!!, Shion wa Rōpu Wāku o Oboeta!!); 62. "Kisses Do Not Contain Oxygen" (酸素はキスに含まれない, Sanso wa Kisu ni Fukuma Renai); 63. "Duck, Duck, Duck Woman" (カモカモカモの女, Kamo Kamo Kamo no On'na); 64. "One Fujoshi's Troubles" (ある腐女子の受難, Aru Fujoshi no Junan); 65. "Can I Do That Too?" (わたしにもできるかしら, Watashi ni mo Dekiru Kashira); 66. "Homare's Decision" (ほまれの決断, Homare no Ketsudan)
6	April 6, 2020	978-4-06-519187-3	August 4, 2020	978-1-64-659626-3
67. "If You Please, Asuka-san" (頼みますよアスカさん, Tanomimasu yo Asuka-san); 68. "Can I Visit Your House?" (お家に行っていいですか？, Oie ni itte Īdesu ka?); 69. "The Eel Taste-Test" (ウナギ実食, Unagi Jisshoku); 70. "Lazy Afternoon" (まどろみの午後, Madoromi no Gogo); 71. "Mucchan Fetishes are a Rolling Hitch" (むっちゃんの性癖がローリング・ヒッチ, Mutchan no Seiheki ga Rōringu Hitchi); 72. "That's Awful, Homare-san" (ひどいですよ、ほまれさん, Hidoidesu yo, Homare-san); 73. "Four Together" (4人で一緒に, Yotari de Issho ni); 74. "Feel the Swell" (うねりを感じて, Uneri o Kanjite); 75. "Carpeted with Stingers" (毒針のカーペット, Dokubari no Kāpetto); 76. "10 Meters Under the Sea" (水深10メートル, Suishin 10 Mētoru); 77. "Sunset Peach" (サンセット・ピーチ, San Setto Pīchi); 78. "Let's Learn a Bunch" (いろいろ身につけよう, Iroiro mi ni Tsukeyou)
7	October 6, 2020	978-4-06-521002-4	August 10, 2021	978-1-63-699297-6
79. "A Bamboo-Gathering Tale" (竹を取る物語, Take o Toru Monogatari); 80. "A Refreshing Sauna!!" (サウナですっきり!!, Sauna de Sukkiri!!); 81. "Antlion" (薄翅蜉蝣, Usuba Kagerō); 82. "The Great Radish Harvest" (ダイコン大収穫, Daikon Dai Shūkaku); 83. "First Annual Wacky Boat Race!!" (第1回チキチキ作って作ってボートレース大会!!, Daiikkai Chiki Chiki Tsukutte Tsukutte Bōtorēsu Taikai!!); 84. "Hail is a Fleeting Pleasure" (雹はうたかたのpleasure, Hyō wa Utakata no Pleasure); 85. "Climb the Cliff" (崖をのぼろう, Gake o Noborou); 86. "Pick and Be Picked" (つまみつままれ, Tsumami Tsumama re); 87. "Well-Slept, Well-Kept" (寝る子は育つ, Nerukohasodatsu); 88. "Have You Ever Eaten Crow?" (カラス食べたことありますか？, Karasu Tabeta Koto Arimasu ka?); 89. "What About the School Festival?" (学園祭は？, Gakuen-sai wa?); 90. "In a Tight Spot" (危機一髪娘, Kikiippatsu Musume); 91. "Flowers of the Sea: So La Ti Do" (水中花ソラシド, Suichūka Sorashido)
8	April 6, 2021	978-4-06-522938-5	December 14, 2021	978-1-63-699514-4
92. "Danger Zone" (デンジャー・ゾーン, Denjā Zōn); 93. "What Would You Take from a Desert Island?" (無人島から持っていくなら何にする？, Mujintō Kara Motte Ikunara Nani ni Suru?); 94. "Mayo-Nays" (魔よね、ずっと, Mayo ne, Zutto); 95. "The Boat, The Grail, and..." (舟と聖杯と, Fune to Seihai to); 96. "Daybreak Emotions" (東雲emotions, Shinonome Emotions); 97. "Regrets that Hit on the High Seas" (公海で航海する後悔, Kōkai de Kōkai Suru Kōkai); 98. "Shipbound Multitasking" (船上のマルチタスク, Senjō no Maruchitasuku); 99. "The Wind Bellows" (風が吹いている, Kaze ga Fuite iru); 100. "The Rime of the Ancient Mariner" (老水夫の詩, Rō Suifu no Uta); 101. "Sleepless Night" (眠れない夜, Nemurenai Yoru); 102. "Blue Tragedy" (青色トラジディー, Aoiro Torajidī); 103. "Night When the Guineafowl Sleep" (ホロホロチョウが眠る月, Horohorochou ga Nemurutsuki)
9	October 6, 2021	978-4-06-525088-4	February 8, 2022	978-1-63-699609-7
104. "I'm Sure She's Alive!" (きっと生きてる！, Kitto Ikiteru!); 105. "Us, Relatively Speaking" (相対的なわたしたち, Sōtaitekina Watashitachi); 106. "Determination" (決意, Ketsui); 107. "Subsistence" (Note: Stylized in all lowercase in the Japanese version.); 108. "To the Rendezvous!" (ランデブーポイントへ！, Randebū Pointo e!); 109. "Everyone's Desperate!" (みんな必死！, Minna Hisshi!); 110. "Commence the Rescue Operation!" (作戦スタートだ！, Sakusen Sutāto da!); 111. "The Long but Short Celebration I" (長く短い祭りI, Nagaku Mijikai Matsuri I); 112. "The Long but Short Celebration II" (長く短い祭りII, Nagaku Mijikai Matsuri II); 113. "The Long but Short Celebration III" (長く短い祭りIII, Nagaku Mijikai Matsuri Natsuri III); 114. "Fanfare of Incense" (抹香のファンファーレ, Makkō no Fanfāre); 115. "Are You Rescued?" (ソウナン終わりました？, Sōnan Owarimashita?)
10	April 6, 2022	978-4-06-527466-8	October 18, 2022	978-1-68-491494-4
116. "For you I" (Note: Stylized as "for you I" in the Japanese version.); 117. "For you II" (Note: Stylized as "for you II" in the Japanese version.); 118. "Desert Island Juliet" (無人島ジュリエット, Mujintō Jurietto); 119. "I Want to Be a Normal High Schooler" (普通の女子高生になりたい, Futsū no Mesukōsei ni Naritai); 120. "Buying Homare Clothes" (ほまれ服を買う, Homare Fuku o Kau); 121. "The School Food Chain" (学校の生態系, Gakkō no Seitaikei); 122. "School Life Ain't Easy" (学校生活も楽じゃない, Gakkō Seikatsu mo Raku Janai); 123. "What Happened Then?" (あの時何があったのか？, Ano Toki Nani ga Atta no ka?); 124. "As Rotten as Ever" (変わらず腐って, Kawarazu Kusatte); 125. "Second Term is Busy" (2学期は忙しくて, Nigakki wa Isogashikute); 126. "A Year Later" (あれから一年, Are Kara Ichinen); 127. "Sumo Time!" (勝負だ相棒！, Shōbuda Aibō!); 128. "Que Sera, Sera" (ケ・セラ・セラ, Ke Sera Sera)

=== Anime ===
An anime television series adaptation was announced in March 2019. The series was produced by Ezóla and directed by Nobuyoshi Nagayama, with Touko Machida handling series composition, and Junnosuke Nishio designing the characters. Akiyuki Tateyama composed the music. The series aired in Japan from July 2 to September 17, 2019, on Tokyo MX, MBS, and BS-NTV, and was simulcast by Crunchyroll. The series consists of 15-minute episodes. M.A.O, Hiyori Kono, Kiyono Yasuno, and Azumi Waki performed the series' opening theme song "Koko wa Doko" (ココハドコ; "Where Are We?"), while Yasuno performed the series' ending theme song "Ikiru" (生きる; "Survive").

==== Episodes ====
No.	Title (Note: All English titles are taken from Crunchyroll.)	Original release date
1	"Adrift"; Transliteration: "Hyōryū" (Japanese: 漂流)	July 2, 2019
After miraculously surviving a plane crash, four high school girls, Homare Onishima, Asuka Suzumori, Mutsu Amatani, and Shion Kujo, head towards a remote island for safety. Using the survival skills she picked up from her father, Homare helps Mutsu tackle dehydration by feeding her a locust with her mouth.
2	"Our First Meal"; Transliteration: "Hajimete no Shokuju" (Japanese: 初めての食事)	July 9, 2019
Homare and Asuka search the island for a source of water, managing to find some damp soil to tide them over until rain starts falling. Later, Homare gathers a bunch of dubious foodstuffs that the girls compete over.
3	"Master of the Island"; Transliteration: "Shima no Nushi" (Japanese: 島のヌシ)	July 16, 2019
As Asuka struggles to prove herself useful to the others, Homare creates a makeshift shower which Shion ends up enjoying. Later, Mutsu helps Homare search the shore for edible shellfish before the gang learn how to start a fire to cook them.
4	"Trap"; Transliteration: "Torappu" (Japanese: トラップ)	July 23, 2019
Homare, Asuka, and Mutsu work on building snare traps to help them catch a rabbit.
5	"A Strange Turban Shell"; Transliteration: "Kimyō na Sazae" (Japanese: 奇妙なサザエ)	July 30, 2019
Needing food to stave them off until their trap catches something, Homare and Asuka dive underwater to search for turban shells, but end up picking up edible starfish instead. When Shion becomes downhearted after she thought she saw a ship, Homare asks her to help her dig up buried fish for a barbecue party to cheer everyone up. Later, Asuka and Mutsu discover that their trap has caught something.
6	"Rabbit Tasting"; Transliteration: "Usagi Jisshoku" (Japanese: ウサギ実食)	August 6, 2019
Catching a live rabbit, which Asuka reluctantly manages to kill, Mutsu, who was unable to kill it herself, is taught how to break down the carcass. After preparing the meat, the girls manage to make an island take on the French cuisine Shion once had.
7	"Exploring the Island"; Transliteration: "Shima wo Tansaku" (Japanese: 島を探索)	August 13, 2019
Homare decides to take Mutsu with her to explore the island, coming across a dock along the way, but the others end up camping with them for the night. The next day, as the girls find some tools in a broken down house, Homare discovers what appears to be smoke coming from somewhere.
8	"Oasis Found!?"; Transliteration: "Oashisu Hakken!?" (Japanese: オアシス発見!?)	August 20, 2019
The smoke turns out to be steam from a hot spring, which the girls immediately decide to soak in. The next day, Homare asks the others to help her retrieve some rope from the bottom of a ravine. When a thunderstorm appears, the girls take measures to protect themselves from the lightning.
9	"Homare's Papa"; Transliteration: "Homare no Papa" (Japanese: ほまれのパパ)	August 27, 2019
Worried about UV rays, the girls try various sunblock alternatives made from squid ink, liver, and seaweed. Later, Homare tries to use more advice she learned from her father, with varying success among the other girls.
10	"Honey Bee"	September 3, 2019
After using some washed up bamboo to build a roof, the girls discover a beehive nearby. Despite the excessive amount of bees, Homare puts herself at risk to retrieve some honeycomb to extract honey from. On another day, Shion tries to prove her worth by fishing on a raft, unknowingly catching a current and drifting off far away from the island.
11	"We Will Rescue Her"; Transliteration: "Zettai Tasukeru" (Japanese: 絶対助ける)	September 10, 2019
Homare sets off on a raft to search for Shion, who at the moment lands on a rocky island and tries to search for any sign of drinkable water. Using her father's advice to expand her view, Homare manages to find the island with Shion on it.
12	"How to Replenish Water"; Transliteration: "Mizu no Hokyū Hōhō" (Japanese: 水の補給方法)	September 17, 2019
As Homare and Shion start to suffer from dehydration on their way back to the island, they are forced to take drastic measures in order to replenish their moisture. As the girls reunite and continue their life surviving in the island, Homare's father Joichi begins searching for her.

== Reception ==
By March 2022, the manga had over 1 million copies in circulation. Gadget Tsūshin listed the anime's Japanese name in their 2019 anime buzzwords list.
