= Tsubasa Yamaguchi =

Japanese manga artist

Tsubasa Yamaguchi 山口つばさ
- Born: June 26 Tokyo
- Area: Manga artist
- Notable works: Blue Period
- Awards: 13th Manga Taishō, 2020 Kodansha Manga Award in the general category

Tsubasa Yamaguchi (Japanese: 山口つばさ, Hepburn: Yamaguchi Tsubasa; born June 26) is a Japanese manga artist. After she graduated from Tokyo University of the Arts, she created two one-shots before launching her first full series, a manga adaptation of She and Her Cat. Following its completion, she launched Blue Period.

== Biography ==
Tsubasa Yamaguchi was born on June 26 in Tokyo. After graduating from Tokyo University of the Arts, she published two one-shots in Good! Afternoon. In 2016, she launched her first full series in Monthly Afternoon, which was a manga adaptation of Makoto Shinkai's She and Her Cat.

On June 17, 2017, she launched her second series, titled Blue Period, in Monthly Afternoon. In 2019, Yamaguchi got married. In the same year, Blue Period was nominated for the Manga Taishō and the Kodansha Manga Award in the general category. In 2020, Blue Period won the Manga Taishō and the Kodansha Manga Award in the general category. It was also nominated for the Tezuka Osamu Cultural Prize in 2020. An anime television series adaptation of the series aired in October 2021.

== Works ==
=== Series ===
- She and Her Cat (彼女と彼女の猫, Kanojo to Kanojo no Neko) (serialized in Monthly Afternoon) (2016)
- Blue Period (ブルーピリオド, Burū Piriodo) (serialized in Monthly Afternoon) (2017–present)

=== One-shots ===
- Nude Model (ヌードモデル) (published in Good! Afternoon) (2015)
- Onna no Ko (おんなのこ) (published in Good! Afternoon) (2015)
- Kamiya (神屋) (2022)

=== Other ===
- Anata wa Koko de, Iki ga Dekiru no? (あなたはここで、息ができるの？) (light novel illustrations) (2020)
- Kusunoki no Bannin (クスノキの番人) (film character designs) (2026)
