= Smile Down the Runway =

Japanese manga series

- First tankōbon volume cover, featuring Chiyuki Fujito

ランウェイで笑って (Ranwei de Waratte)
- Genre: Drama, slice of life
- Manga
- Written by: Kotoba Inoya
- Published by: Kodansha
- English publisher: NA: Kodansha USA (digital)
- Magazine: Weekly Shōnen Magazine
- Original run: May 31, 2017 – July 14, 2021
- Volumes: 22
- Anime television series
- Directed by: Nobuyoshi Nagayama
- Written by: Touko Machida
- Music by: Shuji Katayama; Akinari Suzuki
- Studio: Ezóla (Note: Collaboration between Diomedéa and Studio Blanc.)
- Licensed by: Crunchyroll (Note: In North America through Crunchyroll, LLC (formerly known as Funimation).): SA/SEA: Muse Communication
- Original network: MBS, TBS, BS-TBS
- Original run: January 11, 2020 – March 28, 2020
- Episodes: 12
- Novel

Ranwei de Waratte 158cm Moderu, Parikore e!
- Written by: Yūki Arisawa
- Published by: Kodansha
- Imprint: Kodansha KK Bunko
- Published: April 15, 2020

Smile Down the Runway (Japanese: ランウェイで笑って, Hepburn: Ranwei de Waratte), also known as Smile at the Runway, (Note: This title is seen on the cover of the Japanese version of the manga.) is a Japanese manga series written and illustrated by Kotoba Inoya. It was serialized in Kodansha's shōnen manga magazine Weekly Shōnen Magazine from May 2017 to July 2021, with its chapters collected in 22 tankōbon volumes. Kodansha USA digitally published the manga in North America. An anime television series adaptation by Ezóla aired from January to March 2020 on the Animeism programming block.

== Summary ==
The story follows two teenagers, Ikuto Tsumura and Chiyuki Fujito, who both have dreams of making it in the fashion world despite their circumstances. Chiyuki dreams of becoming a model and participating in the Paris Fashion Week. However, people make fun of her dreams because she is too short, despite having a thin and voluptuous figure. Ikuto wants to become a fashion designer thanks to his sewing skills. However, his family is poor.

An opportunity arises when Hazime Yanagida notices Ikuto's skill at sewing, offering him a part-time job at his fashion studio. Ikuto accepts this offer so he can support his family. Meanwhile, Chiyuki's father asks Ikuto to become her partner since they are both classmates and he wants Chiyuki to follow her dreams despite her height. They are joined by the famous but shy model Kokoro Hasegawa, who has a height complex, and prodigy fashion designer Toh Ayano, who considers Ikuto to be his rival. Chiyuki and Ikuto must work together in order to make their dreams come true.

== Characters ==
=== Protagonists ===
Ikuto Tsumura (都村 育人, Tsumura Ikuto)
Voiced by: Natsuki Hanae, Misato Murai (young) (Japanese); Derick Snow, Colleen Clinkenbeard (young) (English)
Ikuto is a seventeen-year-old aspiring fashion designer. Ikuto has aspired to be a fashion designer from a young age, but he is forced put his dream on halt due to his family's financial struggles. As the eldest child and only son, Ikuto helps his mother take care of his sisters and handles most of the housework and initially refuses to go to college, planning to pursue full-time employment to support his sisters. After befriending Chiyuki and getting a part-time job at Yanagida's studio, Ikuto begins working towards his dream of being a fashion designer, though his financial situation causes him some setbacks. Despite this, he never gives up and supports them, wanting to become fashion designer for Chiyuki and his family in the future. Ikuto later develops feelings for Chiyuki.
Chiyuki Fujito (藤戸 千雪, Fujito Chiyuki)
Voiced by: Yumiri Hanamori (Japanese); Macy Anne Johnson (English)
Chiyuki is a seventeen-year-old model for her father's company Mille Neige. While blessed with good looks, the proper body proportions, and her father's connections and wealth, Chiyuki lacks the minimum height requirement to be a runway model, being 158 cm (5 ft 2 in) tall. Despite this, Chiyuki dreams of participating in the Paris Fashion Week as the representative of her father's company and aims to be a top model, regardless of her short height and what other people thinks of her. Chiyuki later develops feelings for Ikuto.
Kokoro Hasegawa (長谷川 心, Hasegawa Kokoro)
Voiced by: Ai Kayano (Japanese); Dani Chambers (English)
Kokoro is an aspiring, hard-working fashion designer, a first-year student at the Geika Institute of Fashion, and a part-time model at the agency Bon Rouge. Being 181 cm (5 ft 11 in) tall with a shy, submissive, and meek personality, she is self-conscious about her height, though she becomes less bothered by it when she was scouted in high school. Despite being talented as a model, Kokoro dislikes certain aspects of the job, but her feelings of debt toward her manager Igarashi and her lack of confidence prevent her from quitting.
Toh Ayano (綾野 遠, Ayano Tō)
Voiced by: Ryōhei Kimura (Japanese); Lee George (English)
Toh is the 22-year-old adopted child of the famous designer Mai Ayano and Ikuto's rival. He is originally from France and was an orphan who lived on the streets until he was two years old. Having been personally trained by Mai for over twenty years, Toh is a prodigious fashion designer and patternmaker, and is considered the greatest senior student during his time at the Geika Institute of Fashion.

=== Others ===
Hajime Yanagida (柳田 一, Yanagida Hajime)
Voiced by: Junichi Suwabe (Japanese); John Burgmeier (English)
Yanagida is a talented up-and-coming designer of his eponymous brand that caters to women and Ikuto's mentor and first employer. While pleasant and cordial around his customers, Yanagida is sharp-tongued, abrasive, foul-tempered, and arrogant, traits that often leave negative impressions on other people. However, Yanagida is frank and attentive, and sees potential in Ikuto, helping him understand what it means to be a designer.
Kenji Fujito (藤戸 研二, Fujito Kenji)
Voiced by: Kazuhiko Inoue (Japanese); Christopher Wehkamp (English)
Kenji is the founder and president of the modeling agency and up-and-coming brand Mille Neige, and Chiyuki's father. Kenji deeply loves Chiyuki and named his company after her ("Mille Neige" and "Chiyuki" both mean "Thousand Snow" in French and Japanese, respectively) when it was established. A fair yet practical man, he has great faith in Chiyuki's talent as a model, but he never shows her any favoritism.
Shizuku Naruoka (成岡 雫, Naruoka Shizuku)
Voiced by: Fumiko Orikasa (Japanese); Stephanie Young (English)
Shizuku is a model for Mille Neige and is famous for being the first model from the company to walk the runway in the prestigious Paris Fashion Week show. Having known Chiyuki since she was young, Shizuku is Chiyuki's role model, friend, and mentor, and she loves her like a little sister. However, Shizuku is also blunt and pessimistic about Chiyuki's chances of becoming a top model.
Yu Igarashi (五十嵐 優, Igarashi Yu)
Voiced by: Yūko Kaida (Japanese); Colleen Clinkenbeard (English)
Igarashi is Kokoro's manager and an agent from the modeling agency Bon Rouge. Igarashi is a former model and Shizuku's friend and colleague, having worked with her at Bon Rouge as teenagers.
Kaoru Kizaki (木崎 香留, Kizaki Kaoru)
Voiced by: Ayaka Fukuhara (Japanese); Elizabeth Maxwell (English)
Kaoru is a second-year student at the Geika Institute of Fashion who specializes in women's fashion and is a fan of Yanagida. Having worked as a dresser during Yanagida's first fashion show, Kaoru develops a fierce, one-sided rivalry and envy towards Ikuto after seeing him step up to the pressure of modifying one of Yanagida's dresses for Chiyuki.
Ryunosuke Eda (江田 龍之介, Eda Ryūnosuke)
Voiced by: Kōhei Amasaki (Japanese); Nazeeh Tarsha (English)
Ryunosuke is a second-year student at the Geika Institute of Fashion who specializes in men's fashion and is Kaoru's childhood friend. Confident and disliking elite privilege, Ryunosuke is competitive and aims to surpass those who are better than him, such as Toh.
Shoko Takaoka (高岡 祥子, Takaoka Shōko)
Voiced by: Keiko Han (Japanese); Luci Christian (English)
Takaoka is the Headmaster of the Geika Institute of Fashion and takes great pride in her school. Behind her preppy and happy-go-lucky demeanor, Takaoka has a sharp eye and is supportive of all her students, including Ikuto, whom she greatly encourages to attend the school to nurture his talent.
Sara (セイラ, Seira)
Voiced by: Yui Makino (Japanese); Madeleine Morris (English)
Sara is Japan's most famous model and a TV celebrity who is responsible for starting Ikuto's path toward being a designer and reigniting Chiyuki's modeling career after posting a picture of Chiyuki wearing Ikuto's dress on her social media. Despite being 171 cm (5 ft 7 in), which is considered to be short for a runway model, Sara is able to keep her balance and perform on the runway regardless of how high her heels are. While Sara behaves in a cheerful and air-headed manner, she actually has a devious side and is competitive against her modeling rivals.
Mai Ayano (綾野 麻衣, Ayano Mai)
Voiced by: Mayumi Asano (Japanese); Casey Casper (English)
Mai is Toh's adoptive guardian, officially known as his "grandmother", and the CEO of the popular brand Aphro I Dite. She is considered to be one of the top designers in the world and is highly respected by many people. She is a strict yet fair and friendly person with an eye for talent, having high ambitions for Toh and recognizing Ikuto's talent enough to promote him to chief designer of "Aphro I Dite novice", one of the branches of her company.
Fumiyo Niinuma (新沼 文世, Nīnuma Fumiyo)
Voiced by: Ayaka Suwa (Japanese); Emi Lo (English)
Niinuma is an editor for the premier fashion magazine MODE JAPAN, having recently transferred from the literature department. Being timid, shy, and of short stature, Niinuma is insecure about her appearance and her ability to be fashionable, and initially has no interest in fashion. However, she becomes more interested in the fashion world after seeing the short Chiyuki modeling at Yanagida's first fashion show and develops a deep admiration of her, though she has yet to meet her in person.
Yuriko Tsumura (都村 百合子, Tsumura Yuriko)
Voiced by: Houko Kuwashima (Japanese); Brianna Roberts (English)
Yuriko is the kind and loving mother of Ikuto, Honoka, Aoi, and Ichika. Ever since her husband died when her children were young, Yuriko has been the sole provider for her family and her tendency to overwork herself has led her to be hospitalized many times. Despite the hardships she endures, Yuriko remains positive for her children's sake and maintains a playful sense of humor, especially towards Ikuto.
Honoka Tsumura (都村 ほのか, Tsumura Honoka)
Voiced by: Yui Ishikawa (Japanese); Leah Clark (English)
Honoka is the oldest daughter and second oldest child of the Tsumura family. Honoka is smart and spends most of her time studying, even attending a different school from the rest of her siblings and one day dreams of working overseas. However, taking care of her family takes up her attention, causing her grades to occasionally slip, and Honoka denies herself from going to college due to the family's financial situation.
Aoi Tsumura (都村 葵, Tsumura Aoi)
Voiced by: Hibiku Yamamura (Japanese); Trina Nishimura (English)
Aoi is the second younger sister of Ikuto and the third child of the Tsumura family. Aoi is talented at volleyball and has been scouted by top schools, though Aoi declines the offers due to the expensive tuition. Since Aoi's sport takes up her time, she does not help around the house as much as Ikuto or Honoka do, but she steps up when needed. Aoi prefers clothes that are easy to move in and Ikuto often makes often blue-colored clothes for her, which is Aoi's favorite color and the meaning of her name.
Ichika Tsumura (都村 いち花, Tsumura Ichika)
Voiced by: Hikaru Akao (Japanese); Jad Saxton (English)
Ichika is Ikuto's five-year-old sister and the youngest child of the Tsumura family. Ichika deeply adores her older brother and the clothes he makes for her. Her favorite accessory is ribbons. She usually wears one in her hair, and the clothes Ikuto makes for her always have ribbons or ribbon patterns on them.
Mii Sakuma (さくま みい, Sakuma Mii)
Mii is a long-time friend of Yanagida, whom she has a crush on and was her tutor when she was a teenager. She is the daughter of the famous architect, Yoshinori Sakuma, who is also a patron of Aphro I Dite.

== Media ==
=== Manga ===
Smile Down the Runway, written and illustrated by Kotoba Inoya, was serialized in Kodansha's shōnen manga magazine Weekly Shōnen Magazine from May 31, 2017, to July 14, 2021. Kodansha has collected its chapters into individual tankōbon volumes. Twenty-two volumes were released from September 15, 2017, to August 17, 2021. Kodansha USA digitally published the manga in North America.

=== Anime ===
An anime television series adaptation was announced on September 16, 2019. The series was animated by Ezóla and directed by Nobuyoshi Nagayama, with Touko Machida handling series composition, and Misaki Kaneko designing the characters. Shuji Katayama and Akinari Suzuki composed the music. It aired from January 11 to March 28, 2020, on the Animeism programming block on MBS, TBS, and BS-TBS. (Note: MBS and TBS listed the series premiere at 26:25 on January 10, 2020, which is effectively January 11 at 2:25 a.m. JST.) Ami Sakaguchi performed the series' opening theme song "LION", while J-JUN performed the series' ending theme song "Ray of Light". Funimation licensed the series for a SimulDub. In Southeast Asia and South Asia, Muse Communication licensed the series and streamed it on its Muse Asia YouTube channel.

==== Episodes ====
No.	Title (Note: All English titles are taken from Funimation.)	Original release date
1	"This Is Your Story"; Transliteration: "Kore wa kimi no Monogatari" (Japanese: これは君の物語)	January 11, 2020
Chiyuki Fujito has pursued her dream of becoming a top model. Eight years prior, her growth spurt suddenly stopped, which made her way below the 175cm mark necessary for models. Even so, she resolves not to give up. In class, she gets to know Ikuto Tsumura, where she inadvertently discovers his dream of becoming a fashion designer. After telling Ikuto of the impossibility of his dream, Chiyuki beats herself down for discouraging someone and tries for another agency. While she is accepted, Chiyuki ultimately decides to renew her initial dream instead, approaching Ikuto to design clothes for her. Chiyuki once again declares her convictions in front of the judges, including top model Shizuku Naruoka, who catches a glimpse of Paris from her aura and appearance. Chiyuki is finally accepted, and she cries tears of joy over becoming a member of the agency that shares the same meaning as her name, as "Mille Neige" in French means "thousand snow". On the street, Chiyuki has her photo taken and a top model named Sara post it online, earning instant fame. Ikuto is then let into the agency after Chiyuki's father wishes to buy the design of her outfit.
2	"The Professional World"; Transliteration: "Puro no Sekai" (Japanese: プロの世界)	January 18, 2020
Chiyuki's father rescinds the offer for Ikuto after realizing that he is not professionally trained. Chiyuki later attempts to spur him to prove her wrong just like how she did for the many others that discouraged her, only for it to backfire and he instead lashes out at her. Thankfully, they reconcile and Ikuto makes a new outfit for himself to try again at Mille Neige. Chiyuki's father acknowledges Ikuto's potential, but instead of hiring him, he recommends Ikuto to the designing business of one of their old professional designers named Hajime Yanagida to get some experience first. Although Yanagida is crass and egoistic, Ikuto is inspired time and time again by Chiyuki to not leave the studio and continually improves his work. The next day is the beginning of Tokyo Fashion Week and a crucial moment for Yanagida as a top designer, but his last model has to be replaced by Chiyuki instead after she was unable to make it. To make matters worse, Kumi Moriyama, his sole dressmaker, collapses from a nosebleed and exhaustion, prompting Ikuto to volunteer himself to alter the dress to fit Chiyuki's height.
3	"Smile Down the Runway"; Transliteration: "Ranwei de waratte" (Japanese: ランウェイで笑って)	January 25, 2020
Ikuto blanks out from the pressure and the use of unfamiliar cloth and needles. As Chiyuki pulls him up to encourage him again, he realizes that she too is afraid, but nevertheless is fighting for her own dream. With several minutes before Chiyuki has to go out, Ikuto uses unconventional methods to bring the dress together, receiving support from the other models to buy a little more time. The audience is set abuzz when seeing a short model on the runway. Chiyuki risks embarrassing herself further when she crouches down as the shoemaker had accidentally used a broken heel, but is saved by Ikuto purposely not tying off the last thread of her neckline. The thought of Ikuto changing her dress without her notice brings a smile onto her face, although models are always taught never to fall or smile on the runway. Despite this, it earns Chiyuki a standing ovation and she finishes perfectly, changing her gait to return backstage. As the fitter points out their flaws, the two resolve to improve and return here with their own brand. Yanagida acknowledges Ikuto's potential and decides to train him.
4	"Young Talents"; Transliteration: "Wakaki sainō tachi" (Japanese: 若き才能たち)	February 1, 2020
After pulling an all-nighter at Yanagida's, Honoka, Ikuto's studious oldest sister, mistakenly believes that he is working for the family's sake again. The guilt of having to rely on her brother giving up his dream to attain her own, coupled with her falling grades, causes her to lash out in anger at him. They reconcile when Ikuto assures her that he is chasing his own dream while getting paid for the family, the two promising to work hard together. As Yanagida secures a place in a department store for his brand, the high demand for dresses prompts him to find additional support from two members of the famous Geika Fashion School in Japan: Toh Ayano, the grandson of the top designer Mai Ayano, and model-cum-designer freshman Kokoro Hasegawa. Because of the dress' unique material and fitting, Ikuto struggles with it while Toh performs it effortlessly, although the latter realizes Ikuto's great potential and talent amidst his imperfections from lack of skill and experience. At the end of the day, Toh asks Yanagida privately if he can have Ikuto for his own brand.
5	"Individual Styles"; Transliteration: "Sorezore no Ryūgi" (Japanese: それぞれの流儀)	February 8, 2020
As the trains are delayed, Kokoro and Ikuto wait it out at a park bench where Kokoro reveals that she originally wanted to become a model, but was inspired by Mai at her first fashion show to enroll at Geika. Ikuto later attends a lecture at Geika about the school's upcoming Geika Festival and decides he going to try for the grand prize: an opportunity to launch his own brand and study in Paris. Outside the school, he witnesses a confrontation between Kokoro and her manager Yu Igarashi. When he arrives at Kokoro's house, a distraught Kokoro agrees with Igarashi that she may not want to be a designer after all. Recalling how the principal of Geika, Shoko Takaoka, mentioned Kokoro's desire to learn, Ikuto proposes they participate in the Geika Festival to prove Igarashi wrong. For the preliminaries, Ikuto has to design a stylish outfit that can fit Sara within an hour, and sew it up for a model doll in two days. Consulting Chiyuki with help about Sara, who conquered all odds and achieved fame despite her height being 171cm, he eventually finds inspiration in Chiyuki's appearance.
6	"Superiority and Inferiority"; Transliteration: "Yūetsukan to Retsutōkan" (Japanese: 優越感と劣等感)	February 15, 2020
Chiyuki expresses her admiration for Ikuto to her friends. During the preliminaries, Jun Miyamoto, Takaoka, Toh and two other contestants are chosen as judges. Ikuto presents an unconventional design of pajamas. Although Toh is impressed with Ikuto's improvement in the stitchwork, he calls it lame. However, Ikuto picks himself back up when he recalls Chiyuki's approval of his work and submits it without editing anything. Takaoka reveals that the true test was to believe in one's design. The judges then reveal the top three designs that will move straight to the finals, one of which is Ikuto's and another being Kaoru Kizaki's. Toh later bluntly tells Ikuto the true reason why his design received third place and offers him a job under his brand, which Ikuto accepts. Meanwhile, Chiyuki struggles to find magazines to accept her, eventually coming to MODE JAPAN after her performance at Yanagida's show had inspired a fashion editor named Fumiyo Niimura. However, Niimura is replaced by Akasaka instead, who only accepts Chiyuki after a model dropped out at the last minute. At the shoot, Chiyuki meets Kokoro and immediately becomes envious of her height and beauty.
7	"Aura"; Transliteration: "Ora" (Japanese: 存在感(オーラ))	February 22, 2020
Chiyuki recalls how Shizuku taught her of the most important thing in modeling: their aura. Despite being only a supporting model, she is determined to show off her good qualities amidst the other supporting models and Kokoro as the main. Chiyuki fights against putting down Kokoro when the latter has cuts on her hands, but fails when she overhears Kokoro telling Igarashi that she wants to quit modeling. Despite Chiyuki lashing out at her, Kokoro persists in her dream to design clothes instead of modeling. Igarashi recalls how she had cozied her way up as a former model, modeling alongside Shizuku, and was friends with Chiyuki's photographer Miwako. Igarashi realizes that she has treated Chiyuki unfairly and persists with Kokoro becoming a model because of her own sense of inferiority she felt. Kokoro is once again conflicted with her choices when she makes a beginner's mistake at Yanagida's, but she is let in after much begging and Ikuto defending her. Ikuto visits Toh's basement studio where Toh reveals his aspirations of wanting to surpass his grandmother. Following the meeting, Ikuto concludes that he wants to be a full-fledged designer instead of a patternmaker.
8	"The Designer's Capacity"; Transliteration: "Dezainā no Utsuwa" (Japanese: デザイナーの器)	February 29, 2020
The theme of the finals is revealed to be the Japanese character "wa", where anything associated with the character is allowed, and designers are allowed to use models from Geika or have their own, with Ikuto planning to ask Chiyuki. However, he is alerted that his mother in critical condition after repeatedly being in and out of the hospital. Ikuto later realizes that she was holding back her operation so he could have enough money for the Geika Festival. He is forced to choose between his family and his own dream as Toh tries to use his patternmaking skills, while Igarashi tries to bribe him into influencing Kokoro to give up her own designing aspirations. Ikuto finally snaps when he lashes out at his second youngest sister, Aoi. He then meets with Chiyuki's father, who was informed of Ikuto's financial situation. As such, he offers to buy the design Ikuto made for Chiyuki for two million yen in exchange for him comforting his daughter for not receiving a single offer in Paris. A grateful Ikuto asks Chiyuki to star as a model for his collection at the Geika Festival, to which she accepts.
9	"Rivals"; Transliteration: "Raibāru" (Japanese: 好敵手(ライバル))	March 7, 2020
Chiyuki tells Ikuto about her experiences with Kokoro, while he tells her his show's theme will be about "wind". It is not until they arrive at Yanagida's do Chiyuki, Ikuto, and Kokoro realize that they all know one another. However, things change for everybody when Chiyuki and Ikuto witness another confrontation between Kokoro and Igarashi. Recalling how Ikuto placed his faith in Kokoro's hard work and real conviction to be a designer, Chiyuki decides to become a model for Kokoro's show. She then declares that her and Ikuto are officially rivals and resolve to do their best. Now without Chiyuki, Ikuto has to redo all his designs. When Ikuto visits his mother at the hospital, she promises him that the entire family will go watch his show. At Geika, Ikuto announces to Toh that he will prove him wrong and invites Ryunosuke Eda, Kaoru's childhood friend who specializes in men's clothing, to help him out with his new theme of "harmony (chou-wa)", which is also Toh's theme, turning things into a head-on fight. Utilizing experience from Yanagida, Ryunosuke's help and his own creativity, Ikuto heads to the Geika Festival.
10	"Must Not Lose"; Transliteration: "Makerarenai" (Japanese: 負けられない)	March 14, 2020
At the Geika Festival, Ikuto spots Toh, Chiyuki, and Kokoro as they head to the staging area after he fits Haruka Sudo with his design. Meanwhile, Ikuto's family, Mai, Igarashi, Shizuku, and Niimura all observe the show from different areas of the audience. Backstage, Kaoru tells Ikuto she will defeat him. She then reminisces about the moment she saw Ikuto as her rival during Yanagida's show. Elsewhere, Kokoro is fitting Chiyuki with her design while Toh begins his preparation. When it is Ikuto's turn, his collection displays a harmonious vibe from around the world. For the final design, a minimalistic outfit is showcased, which surprises almost everyone except Mai. As such, Ikuto receives a round of applause while his mother cries tears of joy. Kokoro and Chiyuki are up next.
11	"The Promise"; Transliteration: "Yakusoku" (Japanese: 約束)	March 21, 2020
Igarashi begrudgingly admits to Shizuku that Ikuto's show was pretty good before she leaves to take a call. Backstage, Ikuto wishes Kokoro and Chiyuki good luck. When Kokoro catches up with Chiyuki, a flashback reveals how tense their collaboration initially was prior to the Geika Festival due to their rivalry. During this time, Kokoro agreed to Chiyuki's request to walk the runway in exchange for a favor. Back in the present, Kokoro's show begins where Chiyuki wears different outfits. After a while, Igarashi criticizes the presentation. However, she soon notices Chiyuki's aura. Kokoro then appears on stage as a model and it is revealed that the favor was she wanted to make two more outfits, both of which are Igarashi's suit. Seeing this causes Igarashi to be impressed. Afterward, they receive a round of applause and an emotional Chiyuki embraces and thanks Kokoro backstage. Toh is up next.
12	"This Is My Story"; Transliteration: "Kore wa boku no Monogatari" (Japanese: これは僕の物語)	March 28, 2020
Toh recalls Mai telling him if he wants to start his own brand, he has to break her record of fifty-two inquiries at the Geika Festival. Meanwhile, Ikuto meets a buyer named Satomi Ichihara, who offers to buy a few of his designs. When it is Toh's turn, his collection features a harmonious display of both the ordinary and unordinary and he receives a huge round of applause. The contestants then head backstage. After a while, the results of the top ten are in: Kokoro wins first place while Kaoru gets seventh place. Meanwhile, Ikuto finishes in eleventh place while Toh finishes in last place after he withdrew. Later, Kanami Oguri, one of Toh's patternmakers, explains to Ikuto the real reason why Toh withdrew. This is followed by Takaoka handing him a student application form. When Chiyuki and Ikuto meet up, she excitedly tells him she is signing an exclusive contract with a new magazine. After the Geika Festival, Kokoro heads to Paris, Chiyuki begins her modeling career, and Ikuto embarks on an internship at Aphro I Dite alongside Toh.

=== Novel ===
Smile Down the Runway received a novelization by Yūki Arisawa, titled Ranwei de Waratte 158cm Moderu, Parikore e! (ランウェイで笑って 158cmモデル、パリコレへ！), which covers the events of the first two volumes of the series. It was released on April 15, 2020.

No.	Japanese release date	Japanese ISBN
1	April 15, 2020	978-4-06-519210-8
1. Shō moderu (ショーモデル); 2. Watashi ni niau fuku (わたしに似合う服); 3. Kitai no itsuzai (期待の逸材); 4. Narita gari (なりたがり); 5. Tōkyō korekushon (東京コレクション); 6. Bakkusutēji (バックステージ); 7. Ranwei (ランウェイ); Epirōgu (エピローグ)
