= Ezóla =

Japanese animation studio

Ezóla is a Japanese animation brand used as a collective name by Diomedéa and Studio Blanc starting in 2018. The two studios co-produced My Girlfriend Is Shobitch in 2017 prior to the creation of the "Ezóla" brand.

== Works ==
=== Television series ===
Year	Title	Director(s)	Animation producer(s)	Source	Eps.	Refs.
2018	Happy Sugar Life	Keizō Kusakawa (Chief); Nobuyoshi Nagayama	Takeshi Eriguchi	Manga	12	
2019	Are You Lost?	Nobuyoshi Nagayama	Takeshi Eriguchi	Manga	12	
2020	Smile Down the Runway	Nobuyoshi Nagayama	Takeshi Eriguchi	Manga	12	
