= List of Missions of Love chapters =

The fourth English release volume of the series with Yukina in the middle, Shigure to her right, and Akira to her left.

Missions of Love is a Japanese manga series written by Ema Tōyama. Missions of Love was first serialized in the monthly Shōjo magazine Nakayoshi in June 2009 and in the quarterly magazine counterpart Nakayoshi Lovely from December 17, 2009, to March 17, 2010. In all, nineteen volumes were released in Japan. On April 23, 2012, it was announced that Kodansha USA had licensed the series for release in North America. The first volume was released on November 6, 2012, and the last on December 10, 2019. Missions of Love has received mixed to positive ratings with volume's 2 and 4 being on the New York Times Best Seller list for manga. The manga is about a girl named Yukina who is a cell phone novelist who has been struggling with ideas for her novel. Yukina is described as the "absolute zero snow woman" as she does not appear to be warm to people around her. Things get better for her novels when Yukina finds out the most popular boy in school Shigure has a secret. In order to keep it a secret, Shigure is asked by Yukina to do Missions for her that involve romance to better her novel writing as she intends to complete a love story. As the story progresses Yukina begins to question if the feelings are of true love or not. Things get more complicated when Yukina's cousin also states he has feelings for her, in addition Shigure's childhood friend also has intentions of her own.

== Volume list ==
No.	Original release date	Original ISBN	English release date	English ISBN
1	October 6, 2009	978-4-06-364236-0	November 6, 2012	978-1-61262-274-3
01. "Mission 1 I Order You to Fall in Love with Me!"; 02. "Mission 2 I Order You to Hold Me in Your Arms!"; 03. "Mission 3 I Order You to Kiss Me!"; 04. "Mission 4 I Order You to Teach Me About True Love!"; Special Thanks
2	February 5, 2010	978-4-06-364250-6	January 8, 2013	978-1-61262-284-2
05. "Mission 5 I Order You to Act Like My Boyfriend!"; 06. "Mission 6 I Order You to Call Me By My First Name!"; 07. "Mission 7 I Order You to Do Whatever You Want!"; 08. "Mission 8 I Order You to Confess Your Love To Me!"; Extra Mission "Operation: Make Yukina a Princess"; Missions of Love Character Talk
3	June 4, 2010	978-4-06-364268-1	April 9, 2013	978-1-61262-285-9
09. "Mission 9 I Order You to Fight Over Me!"; 10. "Mission 10 I Order You to Take Me on a Date!"; 11. "Mission 11 I Want to Be with You Always"; 12. "Mission 12 I Order You to Carry Me!"; Extra Mission "Yukina Makes Bread"
4	October 6, 2010	978-4-06-364280-3	July 16, 2013	978-1-61262-286-6
13. "Mission 13 I Order You to Bite Me on the Neck!"; 14. "Mission 14 Bad Boys Need to be Punished!"; 15. "Mission 15 I Order You to Stay with Me, Just for a Minute"; 16. "Mission 16 No Talking, Okay?"; Extra Mission "Yukina and Akira and Backrubs"
5	February 4, 2011	978-4-06-364295-7	October 22, 2013	978-1-61262-287-3
17. "Mission 17 I Order You to Read a Secret Note, 'Kay?"; 18. "Mission 18 I Order You to Test My Instincts!!"; 19. "Mission 19 What Am I to Shigure?"; 20. "Mission 20 I Order You to Resist My Temptations!"; Extra Mission "Roman's Grand Adventure"; Afterword
6	June 6, 2011	978-4-06-364309-1	January 14, 2014	978-1-61262-288-0
21. "Mission 21 Don't Worry I'll Protect You"; 22. "Mission 22 I Order You to Nurse Me Back to Health!"; 23. "Mission 23 I Order You to Kiss Me Against My Will!"; 24. "Mission 24 I Order You to Tell Me How to Make a Bond!"; Missions Legends; World Masterpiece Theater
7	October 6, 2011	978-4-06-364324-4	April 15, 2014	978-1-61262-289-7
25. "Mission 25 The Promise"; 26. "Mission 26 I Order You to Be My Love Rival!"; 27. "Mission 27 Shigure's Decision"; 28. "Mission 28 Yukina's Reward"; Bonus: "If the Missions characters were in a video game"
8	February 6, 2012	978-4-06-364337-4	July 29, 2014	978-1-61262-290-3
29. "Mission 29 I Order You to Give Me a Reverse Mission!"; 30. "Mission 30 Suppressed Emotions"; 31. "Mission 31 First Love"; 32. "Mission 32 Shigure's Mark"; Missions Drama CD Voice Recording Report; Bonus: "The Demon's Reflection"
9	June 6, 2012	978-4-06-364353-4	October 7, 2014	978-1-61262-577-5
33. "Mission 33 Unstoppable Feelings"; 34. "Mission 34 Please Look at Me"; 35. "Mission 35 Sensei's Secret"; 36. "Mission 36 I Order You to Make Me Forget!"; Extra Mission "One Day After School"
10	October 5, 2012	978-4-06-364324-4	January 20, 2015	978-1-61262-799-1
37. "Mission 37 Shigure's Room"; 38. "Mission 38 I Order You to Be My Boyfriend!"; 39. "Mission 39 Boyfriend Test Date"; 40. "Mission 40 Safe Zone"; Extra Mission "I Order You to Come with Me to the Hot Springs! Continued."
11	February 6, 2013	978-4-06-364324-4	October 27, 2015	978-1-61262-989-6
41. "Mission 41 Akira's House"; 42. "Mission 42 Yukina's Decision"; 43. "Mission 43 The Count's Feelings"; 44. "Mission 44 Unseen Feelings"; Extra Mission "An Adolescent Memorial"
12	June 13, 2013	978-4-06-364324-4	April 26, 2016	978-1-61262-990-2
45. "Mission 45 Shigure's Brother"; 46. "Mission 46 Twisted Affection"; 47. "Mission 47 The Value of a Hairpin"; 48. "Mission 48 Tactical Romance"; Bonus Mission "Backstage Theatre"
13	October 11, 2013	978-4-06-364324-4	November 1, 2016	978-1-63236-105-9
49. "Mission 49 Time Limit"; 50. "Mission 50 On the Other End of the Phone"; 51. "Mission 51 What Makes You Cruel"; 52. "Mission 52 Where the Heart Lies"; Extra Mission "Mami's Birthday"
14	February 6, 2014	978-4-06-364413-5	April 25, 2017	978-1-63236-187-5
53 "Mission 53 Lost and Found in the Night Sea"; 54 "Mission 54 A Night Alone Together"; 55 "Mission 55 A Heart Set in Motion"; 56 "Mission 56 Dreams ↔ Reality"; Extra Mission "Akira's Desk"
15	June 13, 2014	978-4-06-364426-5	June 26, 2018	978-1-63236-188-2
57 "A New Chapter"; 58 "Reunion"; 59 "The Morning Goodbye"; 60 "Feeling Weak"; Extra Mission "Bonus Manga"
16	November 13, 2014	978-4-06-364444-9	December 24, 2018	978-1-63236-189-9
61 "Whose Side Are You On?"; 62 "My Number One"; 63 "Dinner with the Kitamis"; 64 "I Want You to Fall in Love with Me!"; Extra Mission "Bonus Manga"
17	February 2, 2015	978-4-06-364457-9	June 11, 2019	978-1-63236-678-8
65 "Instruction"; 66 "I Order You to Get to Know Me!"; 67 "The Words I Wanted to Hear"; 68 "Playing Doctor"; Extra Mission "Bonus Manga"
18	June 12, 2015	978-4-06-364473-9	September 24, 2019	978-1-63236-847-8
19	November 13, 2015	978-4-06-364489-0	December 10, 2019	978-1-63236-848-5
