= Haruka Fukushima =

Japanese manga artist

Haruka Fukushima (フクシマ ハルカ, Fukushima Haruka) is a Japanese shōjo manga artist. from Maniwa, Okayama Prefecture.

== Career ==
She made her manga debut in 1999 in Nakayoshi magazine with her award-winning Sakuranbo Kiss. She considers Otona ni Nuts (Instant Teen: Just Add Nuts) to be her masterpiece. Other works include Ai Ga Nakucha Ne!, Bibitte Mu-cho, Cherry Juice, Kedamono Damono, Fortune☆Cake, Young Mermaid, AAA and more recently Orange Planet, Kimi No Neiro, and Animal Official. All of them are or were published in Nakayoshi.

In 2020, Fukushima illustrated the supplemental and full-length manga adaptation for the film Sakura.
