= Studio Blanc =

Japanese animation studio

Studio Blanc Co., Ltd.
- Native name: 株式会社スタジオブラン
- Romanized name: Kabushiki-gaisha Sutajioburan
- Type: Kabushiki gaisha
- Industry: Japanese animation
- Founded: September 3, 2008; 18 years ago
- Founder: Takeshi Eriguchi
- Headquarters: 1-14-5 Sekimachi-kita, Nerima, Tokyo, Japan
- Key people: Takeshi Eriguchi (representative director)
- Total equity: ¥ 3,000,000
- Number of employees: 25
- Website: www.s-blanc.net

Studio Blanc Co., Ltd. (Japanese: 株式会社スタジオブラン, Hepburn: Kabushiki-gaisha Sutajioburan) is a Japanese animation studio based in Sekimachi-kita, Nerima-ku, Tokyo. The studio was founded on September 3, 2008, by Takeshi Eriguchi. Between 2018 and 2020, the studio collaborated with Diomedéa under the brand name Ezóla.

== Works ==
=== Television series ===
Title	Director(s)	First run start date	Last run end date	Eps	Note(s)	Ref(s)
Ro-Kyu-Bu!	Keizō Kusakawa	July 1, 2011	September 24, 2011	12	Based on a light novel written by Sagu Aoyama. Co-animated with Project No.9.	
My Girlfriend Is Shobitch	Nobuyoshi Nagayama	October 12, 2017	December 13, 2017	10	Based on a manga written by Namiru Matsumoto. Co-animated with Diomedéa.	
Life Lessons with Uramichi Oniisan	Nobuyoshi Nagayama	July 6, 2021	September 28, 2021	13	Based on a manga written by Gaku Kuze.	
The Reincarnation of the Strongest Exorcist in Another World	Nobuyoshi Nagayama (Chief); Ryōsuke Shibuya	January 7, 2023	April 1, 2023	13	Based on a light novel written by Kiichi Kosuzu.	
Ayaka: A Story of Bonds and Wounds	Nobuyoshi Nagayama	July 2, 2023	September 17, 2023	12	Original work by GoRA and King Records.	
Vampire Dormitory	Nobuyoshi Nagayama	April 7, 2024	June 23, 2024	12	Based on a manga written by Ema Tōyama.	
Private Tutor to the Duke's Daughter	Nobuyoshi Nagayama	July 5, 2025	September 28, 2025	12	Based on a light novel written by Riku Nanano.	

=== Original video animation ===
Title	Director(s)	Release date	Eps	Note(s)	Ref(s)
Goulart Knights: Evoked the Beginning Black	Masahiro Sonoda	December 24, 2010	1	The first original anime by Lantis to celebrate their 10th anniversary.	
Goulart Knights: Evoked the Beginning White	Masahiro Sonoda	September 25, 2011	1	Sequel of Goulart Knights: Evoked the Beginning Black.	
My Girlfriend is Shobitch OVA	Nobuyoshi Nagayama	March 25, 2018	2	A Blu-ray disc with two anime episodes bundled with a limited edition of the sixth manga volume. Co-animated with Diomedéa.	
