= Cherry Juice =

Japanese manga series

- The Tokyopop edition of the first Cherry Juice volume featuring Otome (right) and Minami (left) on the cover.

チェリージュース (Cherī Jūsu)
- Genre: Comedy, Romance, Drama
- Manga
- Written by: Haruka Fukushima
- Published by: Kodansha
- English publisher: NA: Tokyopop
- Magazine: Nakayoshi
- Original run: July 2004 – January 2006
- Volumes: 4

Cherry Juice (チェリージュース, Cherī Jūsu) is a shojo manga series created by Haruka Fukushima, centered on a growing romance between two step-siblings, Minami and Otome. It was originally serialized in Nakayoshi, and was published by Kodansha in 2004. The first volume of the series was released in America by Tokyopop in September 2007.

== Plot ==
For 5 years, Otome and Minami have been step siblings. Their grandmother is staying with them, taking up Otome's room while she recovers from surgery. This results are to Otome having to bunk in her brother's room. They have divided the room with a sheet hanging from the ceiling between the bed where Otome sleeps and a futon on the floor where Minami is sleeping. This often results in Otome either falling half-dressed out of her bed and onto Minami or Minami knocking down the sheet while Otome isn't there and rifling through her things. Shortly afterwards, a boy named Amane kisses Otome and they begin to date. This sparks emotions in Minami, forcing him to realize that he may feel for Otome more than brotherly love. As Minami begins to express this inner struggle through teasing, harsh words, and awkward romantic gestures, Otome comes to feel the same things.

== Characters ==
=== Main characters ===
Otome Hasaki (羽崎 乙女, Hasaki Otome)
The cheerful, cute, clumsy older step-sister of Minami. Otome is at first oblivious to Minami's growing feelings for her. She has a crush on Amane (Minami's friend), but also finds that she's heartbroken at the thought of Minami transferring to another high school next year. Throughout the story, she is "given up" by Amane because he realizes that she loves Minami more than she loves him. At the end of the series, Otome and Minami get together.
Minami Hasaki (羽崎 南, Hasaki Minami)
Otome's step-brother who was three days younger than her. Minami is popular with girls and flirts confidently with almost every one of them in school. He even turns his interest in baking into a strategy to charm the opposite sex. As Otome starts showing interest in other boys, Minami is surprised to find that this bothers him to have rivals for his sister's attention. At age 17, he goes to study in Kyoto and leaves Otome behind. But at Christmas, he comes back and starts dating her. In truth, Minami actually fell in love with Otome at first sight.

=== Other characters ===
Amane Noda (野田 周, Noda Amane)
Serious and athletic, Amane is the captain of the school kendo team. He used to love Otome and confessed his feelings to her and they began to go out. Amane was making Minami jealous and became very possessive of Otome. He then tries to make her forget about Minami. But after a while, he realizes that Otome loves Minami more and finally "gives up on her". Amane then understands that Otome has feelings for Minami. Later on, he goes out with one of her friends, Naru.
Naru Uehara (上原 なる, Uehara Naru)
Naru is Otome's close friend who is an expressionless, cool girl. She is solemn and speaks bluntly at times. Naru is observant, realizing Minami's and Otome's changing feelings toward each other before they do. She pokes around Otome's personal life, trying to get her to admit the truth of her love. Naru has been dating Amane after he gave up on Otome.
Aiko (アイコ, Aiko)
Another one of Otome's close friends. She is seen as energetic and is one of Minami's fangirls. But in the end, she ends up with Hokuto.
Kasumi (?, Kasumi)
Kasumi is one year younger than Minami and is also a member of the cooking club. When Minami first began flirting with Kasumi, she was mildly offended and embarrassed, reacting defensively. Eventually she allows herself to get closer to him. Though it seems like she and Minami have begun a legitimate relationship, she easily spots his affection for Otome and is frustrated by it. She is very interested in Minami and tries to get him to return her feelings and give her more attention. Later on, she finally gives up and realizes that it's impossible for Minami to return her feelings because he's in love with Otome.
Granny
She acts as a loving grandmother to both of the siblings, and was the person who got them to get along when they first became a family by having them both over at her house during summer break. Granny is a busybody, gossiping and spying on Minami when he is alone in his room with Kasumi. She made matching yukata for Minami and Otome. When Otome ran away she went to Granny's empty house and lounged in the plastic kiddy pool Granny had used to bring Minami and Otome together years before.
Hokuto Imai (今井 北斗, Imai Hokuto)
The younger biological brother of Minami that likes to tease Otome, although he somewhat looks and acts older than Minami. Hokuto is a very mean, sadistic boy that has qualities that are very similar to Minami. At first he is very rude to Otome and Minami, but immediately fell for Otome when he sees her in a wedding dress for a cosplay competition. As a proof that Hokuto threatens to steal Otome, he kisses her in front of Minami. Later in the end, he ends up with Aiko instead after she gives him a candy to cure his sore throat.

== Media ==
Originally published by Kodansha and serialized by Nakayoshi in Japan, Cherry Juice was first released in America by Tokyopop in 2007. The series ran for four volumes, from December 2004 until April 2006. In America, the series has three volumes out with one to be released in August. The fourth volume's release date is not known as of now. In Germany, it was first released in July 2006 and the final volume released in February 2007. The manga was never released in an animated format.

| No. | Original release date | Original ISBN | English release date | English ISBN |
|---|---|---|---|---|
| 01 | December 6, 2004 | 978-4-06-364064-9 | September, 2007 | 1-4278-0286-6 |
| 02 | April 28, 2005 | 978-4-06-364079-3 | January, 2008 | 1-4278-0287-4 |
| 03 | November 4, 2005 | 978-4-06-364094-6 | May, 2008 | 1-4278-0288-2 |
| 04 | April 6, 2006 | 978-4-06-364107-3 | August 12, 2008 | 1-4278-0289-0 |

== Reception ==
"Artist Haruka Fukushima has drawn some pretty wacked-out romance in the past (see Kedamono Damono for ample evidence of that), but Cherry Juice plays it a great deal straighter, saving most of the comedy for the cute little side comments that dot each page." — Kevin Gifford, Newtype USA. "This manga is a romantic dramedy like few, if any, others. The latest in this romance series sees relationships turned inside out and a taboo line perhaps being crossed." — Holly Ellingwood, activeAnime. "Definitely a tweens and young teens title, older readers or those more widely read could appreciate some of the perceptive observation, but might be unimpressed with the rest." — Patricia Beard, Mania.
