= Sayuri Sadaoka =

Japanese voice actress (born 1955)

- 定岡 小百合
- Born: September 4, 1955 (age 71); Kanagawa Prefecture, Japan
- Education: Tamagawa University
- Occupation: Voice actress
- Years active: 1979–present
- Agent: Production Ace

Sayuri Sadaoka (定岡 小百合, Sadaoka Sayuri; born September 4, 1955) is a Japanese voice actress.

== Filmography ==
=== Anime ===
- The Ancient Magus' Bride – Lizbeth Sergeant
- Another – Amane
- Black Butler – Ludia, Queen Victoria (Season 1)
- The Blue Wolves of Mibu – Granny
- The Brave of Gold Goldran – Serious Walzac/Serious Izak
- Chained Soldier 2 – Riu Myouga
- Fastening Days – Anna
- Fruits Basket 2nd Season (2020) - Mayuko's Mother (ep 12)
- Les Misérables: Shōjo Cosette – Mother Innocente
- Life Lessons with Uramichi Oniisan – Sayuri
- Muteki Kanban Musume – Onimaru Makiko
- Private Tutor to the Duke's Daughter – Sherry Walker
- Rent-A-Girlfriend – Sayuri Ichinose
- Ultra Nyan: Hoshizora Kara Maiorita Fushigi Neko (Anko)
- Ultra Nyan 2: Happy Daisakusen (Anko)
- Undead Girl Murder Farce – Old Lady Regi
- Yakitate!! Japan – Old Lady (ep 57)
- Yurei Deco – Madam 44

=== Video games ===
- Baten Kaitos: Eternal Wings and the Lost Ocean – Barnette
- Shenmue – Xia Xiu Yu

=== Dubbing ===
==== Live-action ====
- 12 Angry Men (VHS edition) (Judge Cynthia Nance (Mary McDonnell))
- Amélie (Gina (Clotilde Mollet))
- The Angriest Man in Brooklyn (Bette Altmann (Melissa Leo))
- Annie: A Royal Adventure! (Mrs. Fowler (Ann Morrish))
- Bloodline (Sally Rayburn (Sissy Spacek))
- Dangerous Minds (Carla Nichols (Robin Bartlett))
- Dune (Shadout Mapes (Golda Rosheuvel))
- Eddington (Dawn (Deirdre O'Connell))
- EDtv (Jeanette Pekurny (Sally Kirkland))
- Final Destination 2 (Nora Carpenter (Lynda Boyd))
- Frank Herbert's Children of Dune (Princess Wensicia (Susan Sarandon))
- Friends with Money (Jane (Frances McDormand))
- From Russia with Love (Rosa Klebb (Lotte Lenya))
- Gossip Girl (Celia Rhodes (Caroline Lagerfelt))
- Henry Poole Is Here (Esperanza Martinez (Adriana Barraza))
- I, Tonya (LaVona Golden (Allison Janney))
- John Carter (Sarkoja (Polly Walker))
- Last Night in Soho (Margaret "Peggy" Turner (Rita Tushingham))
- Little House on the Prairie (2019 NHK BS4K edition) (Harriet Oleson (Katherine MacGregor))
- Lock, Stock and Two Smoking Barrels (Tanya (Vera Day))
- Marcel the Shell with Shoes On (Lesley Stahl)
- Moonfall (Mrs. Elaine Houseman (Kathleen Fee))
- Moonlight Mile (Jojo Floss (Susan Sarandon))
- Oz (Sister Peter Marie Reimondo (Rita Moreno))
- Paddington (Mrs. Bird (Julie Walters))
- Paddington 2 (Mrs. Bird (Julie Walters))
- Platoon (2003 TV Tokyo edition) (Old Woman)
- Professor Marston and the Wonder Women (Josette Frank (Connie Britton))
- The Rainmaker (Dot Black (Mary Kay Place))
- The Resident (Lane Hunter (Melina Kanakaredes))
- Silent Hill (Dahlia Gillespie (Deborah Kara Unger))
- Silent Hill: Revelation (Dahlia Gillespie (Deborah Kara Unger))
- Somewhere in Time (2021 BS Tokyo edition) (Laura Roberts (Teresa Wright))
- Speed 2: Cruise Control (Debbie (Colleen Camp))
- Transformers: Dark of the Moon (Charlotte Mearing (Frances McDormand))
- United 93 (Deborah Welsh (Polly Adams))
- Wayward Pines (Pamela Pilcher (Melissa Leo))
- Willy's Wonderland (Sheriff Eloise Lund (Beth Grant))

==== Animation ====
- The Angry Birds Movie (Shirley)
- Batman Beyond (Commissioner Barbara Gordon)
- Batman Beyond: Return of the Joker (Commissioner Barbara Gordon)
- Cars 3 (Miss Fritter)
- Coraline (Mrs. Lovat)
- Corpse Bride (Hildegarde)
- Finding Nemo (Peach)
- Finding Dory (Peach)
- The Good Dinosaur (Lurleane)
- Hotel Transylvania (Gremlin)
- Inside Out (Mom's Anger)
- Ralph Breaks the Internet (Ebay Elayne)
- Soul (Libba Gardner)
- Turning Red (Wu)
