= Private Tutor to the Duke's Daughter =

Japanese light novel series

- First light novel volume cover, featuring Tina Howard (front) and Allen (back)

公女殿下の家庭教師 (Kōjo Denka no Katei Kyōshi)
- Genre: Harem, fantasy
- Novel series
- Written by: Riku Nanano
- Published by: Kakuyomu
- Original run: October 6, 2017 – present
- Light novel
- Written by: Riku Nanano
- Illustrated by: Cura
- Published by: Fujimi Shobo
- English publisher: NA: J-Novel Club
- Imprint: Fujimi Fantasia Bunko
- Original run: December 20, 2018 – present
- Volumes: 21 + 1 prequel volume
- Manga
- Written by: Riku Nanano
- Illustrated by: Tamura Mutō
- Published by: Kadokawa Shoten
- English publisher: NA: J-Novel Club
- Magazine: Shōnen Ace Plus
- Original run: September 13, 2019 – present
- Volumes: 5
- Anime television series
- Directed by: Nobuyoshi Nagayama
- Written by: Megumi Shimizu
- Music by: Kei Haneoka
- Studio: Studio Blanc
- Licensed by: Crunchyroll; SEA: Muse Communication
- Original network: Tokyo MX, BS11, AT-X, HTB
- Original run: July 5, 2025 – September 28, 2025
- Episodes: 12

Private Tutor to the Duke's Daughter (Japanese: 公女殿下の家庭教師, Hepburn: Kōjo Denka no Katei Kyōshi) is a Japanese light novel series written by Riku Nanano. The series originated on the Kakuyomu website in October 2017 before being published in print by Fujimi Shobo with illustrations by Cura, beginning in December 2018. A manga adaptation, illustrated by Tamura Mutō, began serialization on the Shōnen Ace Plus website in September 2019. An anime television series adaptation produced by Studio Blanc aired from July to September 2025.

== Characters ==
Allen (アレン, Aren)
Voiced by: Yuma Uchida (voice comic), Yūto Uemura (anime)
Tina Howard (ティナ・ハワード, Tina Hawādo)
Voiced by: Rina Hidaka (voice comic), Hime Sawada (anime)
Ellie Walker (エリー・ウォーカー, Erī Uōkā)
Voiced by: Miyuri Shimabukuro (voice comic), Kyōka Moriya (anime)
Lydia Leinster (リディヤ・リンスター, Ridiya Rinsutā)
Voiced by: Ikumi Hasegawa (anime)
Stella Howard (ステラ・ハワード, Sutera Hawādo)
Voiced by: Inori Minase (anime)
Caren (カレン, Karen)
Voiced by: Ami Maeshima (anime)
Lynne Leinster (リィネ・リンスター, Ryine Rinsutā)
Voiced by: Miho Okasaki (anime)
Felicia Fosse (フェリシア・フォス, Ferishia Fosu)
Voiced by: Kana Hanazawa (anime)
Professor (教授, Kyōju)
Voiced by: Kentaro Tone (voice comic), Yūya Uchida (anime)
Anko-san (アンコさん)
Voiced by: Hana Satō (anime)
Walter Howard (ワルター・ハワード, Warutā Hawādo)
Voiced by: Yū Wakabayashi (voice comic), Junichi Suwabe (anime)
Graham Walker (グラハム・ウォーカー, Gurahamu Uōkā)
Voiced by: Mitsuki Nakamura (voice comic), Hiroshi Naka (anime)
Sherry Walker (シェリー・ウォーカー, Sherī Uōkā)
Voiced by: Sayuri Sadaoka (anime)
Gil Algren (ギル・オルグレン, Giru Oruguren)
Voiced by: Tomohiro Ōno (anime)
Lisa Leinster (リサ・リンスター, Risa Rinsutā)
Voiced by: Ayako Kawasumi (anime)
Richard Leinster (リチャード・リンスター, Richādo Rinsutā)
Voiced by: Tatsumaru Tachibana (anime)
Anna (アンナ)
Voiced by: Saya Horigome (anime)
Gerard Wainwright (ジェラルド・ウェインライト, Jerarudo Ueinraito)
Voiced by: Toshiya Miyata (anime)

== Media ==
=== Light novel ===
Written by Riku Nanano, the series began publication on the novel posting website Kakuyomu on October 6, 2017. The series was later acquired by Fujimi Shobo, who began publishing the series in print with illustrations by Cura on December 20, 2018. As of November 2025, 21 volumes and a prequel volume have been released.

In September 2021, J-Novel Club announced that they licensed the series for English publication.

==== Volumes ====
No.	Title	Original release date	English release date
1	Starting Magic Lessons with a Few Modest Tricks 謙虚チートな魔法授業をはじめます	December 20, 2018; 978-4-04-073021-9	December 21, 2021; 978-1-71-838598-6
2	Creating a New Legend with the Unbeatable Lady of the Sword 最強剣姫と新たな伝説をつくります	February 20, 2019; 978-4-04-073022-6	February 16, 2022; 978-1-71-838600-6
3	Guiding a Lost Saint with a Magical Revolution 魔法革命で迷える聖女を導きます	June 20, 2019; 978-4-04-073221-3	May 26, 2022; 978-1-71-838602-0
4	Saving the Kingdom over Summer Break with Ladies of Ice and Fire 氷炎の姫君と夏休みに王国を救います	October 19, 2019; 978-4-04-073222-0	August 11, 2022; 978-1-71-838604-4
5	The Lightning Wolf and Upheaval in the Kingdom 雷狼の妹君と王国動乱	March 19, 2020; 978-4-04-073583-2	November 1, 2022; 978-1-71-838606-8
6	The Lady of the Sword's Lament and the War in the South 慟哭の剣姫と南方戦役	July 17, 2020; 978-4-04-073584-9	January 23, 2023; 978-1-71-838608-2
7	The Saint's Guidance and the Battle for the North 先導の聖女と北方決戦	November 20, 2020; 978-4-04-073852-9	April 5, 2023; 978-1-71-838610-5
8	The Second Coming of Shooting Star and the Final Showdown in the Eastern Capital 再臨の流星と東都決着	March 19, 2021; 978-4-04-073853-6	June 22, 2023; 978-1-71-838612-9
9	The Savior's Day of Rest 英雄の休息日	July 16, 2021; 978-4-04-074145-1	September 14, 2023; 978-1-71-838614-3
10	The Millennial Capital 千年の都	November 20, 2021; 978-4-04-074146-8	November 30, 2023; 978-1-71-838616-7
11	Illusions of History 歴史の幻影	March 19, 2022; 978-4-04-074477-3	February 22, 2024; 978-1-71-838618-1
12	The Promised Garden 約束の花園	July 20, 2022; 978-4-04-074478-0	May 16, 2024; 978-1-71-838620-4
13	The Great-Tree Warden's Testament 大樹守りの遺言	November 18, 2022; 978-4-04-074735-4	August 22, 2024; 978-1-71-838622-8
14	The Angel That Broke the Star Oath 星約違いの天使	April 20, 2023; 978-4-04-074736-1	December 23, 2024; 978-1-71-838624-2
15	The Ice Wyrm That Slew Champions 英傑殺しの氷龍	August 19, 2023; 978-4-04-075020-0	March 11, 2025; 978-1-71-838626-6
16	The False God That Deceived the World 世界欺きの偽神	February 20, 2024; 978-4-04-075021-7	June 17, 2025; 978-1-71-838628-0
17	The Celestial Spear, Successor to the Star 星継ぎし天槍	July 20, 2024; 978-4-04-075491-8	September 2, 2025; 978-1-71-838630-3
18	The Divine Gun, Piercer of Darkness 闇射ちし神銃	January 18, 2025; 978-4-04-075731-5	November 20, 2025; 978-1-71-838632-7
19	The Sacred Shield, Guardian of the Key 鍵護りし聖楯	April 18, 2025; 978-4-04-075890-9	February 19, 2026; 978-1-71-838634-1
20	The Star Rod, Herald of Dawn 暁告げし星杖	July 18, 2025; 978-4-04-075976-0	June 9, 2026; 978-1-71-838636-5
0	Tales from the Royal Academy 王立学校編	July 18, 2025; 978-4-04-075978-4	September 10, 2026; 978-1-71-838638-9
21	The Lunar Key, Fulfiller of the Vow 誓遂げし月鍵	November 20, 2025; 978-4-04-076134-3	November 30, 2026; 978-1-71-838640-2
22	Echoes of the Moon Fiend 月魔の残響	April 17, 2026; 978-4-04-076304-0	—

=== Manga ===
A manga adaptation, illustrated by Tamura Mutō, began serialization on Kadokawa Shoten's Shōnen Ace Plus website on September 13, 2019. As of July 2025, the series' individual chapters have been collected into five tankōbon volumes.

At Anime Expo 2024, J-Novel Club announced that they also licensed the manga adaptation for English publication.

==== Volumes ====
No.	Original release date	Original ISBN	English release date	English ISBN
1	July 21, 2020	978-4-04-109454-9	October 23, 2024	978-1-71-831688-1
2	September 25, 2021	978-4-04-109455-6	January 8, 2025	978-1-71-831689-8
3	April 26, 2023	978-4-04-113036-0	March 26, 2025	978-1-71-831690-4
4	February 26, 2024	978-4-04-114552-4	June 4, 2025	978-1-71-831691-1
5	July 26, 2025	978-4-04-116299-6	June 3, 2026	978-1-71-831692-8

=== Anime ===
On October 14, 2023, during the "Fantasia Bunko Daikanshasai Online 2023" livestream event, an anime adaptation was announced. It was later confirmed to be a television series that is produced by Studio Blanc and directed by Nobuyoshi Nagayama, with assistant direction by Kazuya Ishiguri, scripts written by Megumi Shimizu, characters designed by Akiko Toyoda, and music composed by Kei Haneoka. The series aired from July 6 to September 28, 2025, on Tokyo MX and other networks. (Note: Tokyo MX and BS11 listed the series premiere on July 5, 2025, at 25:30, which is effectively July 6 at 1:30 a.m. JST.) The opening theme song is "Wish for You", performed by Ami Maeshima, while the ending theme song is "Shōjo no Susume" (少女のすゝめ; "A Girl's Advice"), performed by Miho Okasaki. Crunchyroll is streaming the series. Muse Communication licensed the series in Southeast Asia.

==== Episodes ====
No.	Title	Directed by (Note: Production staff information is taken from the ending credits of each episode.)	Written by	Storyboarded by	Original release date (Note: Episodes were released on Abema, d-anime Store, Crunchyroll, and Muse Asia a week before their televised airings.)
1	"The Duke's Magically Impaired Daughter"; Transliteration: "Mahō ga Tsukae nai Kōjo Denka" (Japanese: 魔法が使えない公女殿下)	Kazuya Ishiguri	Megumi Shimizu	Nobuyoshi Nagayama	July 6, 2025
Having failed his court sorcerer exam, Allen accepts a job from Duke Walter Howard to tutor his daughter Tina. Allen meets head butler Graham and maid Ellie, though he quickly deduces Ellie is Tina in disguise. The real Ellie is also overwhelmed to meet Allen. Walter soon tells Allen was secretly hired to prevent Tina attending the Royal Academy, explaining his family may soon lose their position as his eldest daughter Stella, already an Academy student, is too weak in magic to master their Supreme Spell, while Tina cannot cast spells at all. As such, he wants Tina to continue her botanical research instead. Allen asks Walter to let Tina apply to the Academy if he can raise her magical ability. Walter agrees as long as Allen also tutors Ellie, Graham's granddaughter. Allen introduces everyone to his familiar, the black cat Anko. Tina reveals it is her dream to master a Great Spell. Watching Tina try to light a candle, Allen deduces she has an adequate mana but something stops her spells activating. He decides to discover the cause and demonstrates he is capable of lighting eight candles at once with each of the eight elements.
2	"That Which Rejects"; Transliteration: "Kyozetsu Suru Mono" (Japanese: 拒絶するモノ)	Ayako Sugi	Megumi Shimizu	Kazuya Ishiguri	July 13, 2025
Allen explains in the last two centuries, the number of sorcerers being born has increased, but the power of each individual has shrunk. It is Allen's theory that magic is only possible thanks to spirits. Allen meets head maid Shelley, Graham's wife, who implores him not to abandon Tina like so many tutors have beforehand. Allen receives a letter from Lydia, scolding him for not coming to her if he needed a job. She also reminds him she will be there on the day of Tina's academy entrance exam. Tina makes some tiny progress; while her spell still fails, some ice flakes are left behind, proving the magic is there. Having failed with the modern magical theory, Allen looks to the past for answers. He also deduces Ellie is held back by lack of confidence, so he enlists Graham and Shelley's help to ensure she knows she is supported. Walter decides that unless Tina uses magic soon, Allen must stop her from enrolling at the academy. Upset, Tina tearfully admits to feeling unworthy and jealous of Ellie, whose magic has continued to improve. Her outburst causes an explosion of ice that freezes the library.
3	"In The Wake of Tears, Flowers Bloom"; Transliteration: "Namida no Ato ni Saku Hana" (Japanese: 涙の後に咲く花)	Asahi Yoshimura	Megumu Sasano	Mashami Watanabe	July 20, 2025
Allen makes the unpleasant decision to link his mana to Tina's, temporarily taking control of it. As he does, he senses the amount of mana she possesses is unheard of, but he manages to stop the spell with help from a frozen bird within Tina's subconscious. Having damaged the library, Allen is forced to move their lessons. However, when Tina tries again, she produces so much ice she destroys the roof. Allen suspects the creature used to be blocking her magic but has now stopped. While doing research, Allen starts to worry he has not heard from Lydia recently. He then notices a lot of the books he reads concerning Tina's ice magic seem to have been placed in the library by the same person. Walter eventually summons Allen to inform him Tina is forbidden from taking the academy entrance exam. Allen refutes this and reveals the books on ice magic all belonged to Tina’s mother Rosa, who clearly intended for Tina to attend the academy. Walter agrees Tina can take the entrance exam, but only if she passes one more test, a duel against a skilled sorcerer of his choosing.
4	"The Final Exam"; Transliteration: "Saishū Shiken" (Japanese: 最終試験)	Musashi Seki	Rie Kojika	Kōki Tomari	July 27, 2025
Allen begins teaching Tina and Ellie to fight with magic. Allen reveals if they get into the Academy, his older sister Caren will be their senior. The girls eventually improve enough to beat Allen in a practice duel. Allen continues researching but still learns nothing about the creature in Tina's mind. Unable to sleep, Tina ends up telling Allen about the stories her mother used to read. Allen decides to show Tina her mother's books, making her happy. For their duel, Tina is given her mother's staff. The sorcerer arrives wearing a mask to hide his identity with magic. After a lengthy duel, the sorcerer casts the Howard family's Supreme Spell, Blizzard Wolf. He also refuses to let the duel end unless Tina casts her own Supreme Spell. With Allen inspiring her and Ellie's help, Tina casts such a powerful spell the frozen bird appears before them, obliterates Blizzard Wolf and tears the roof off the building. With his mask broken, the sorcerer is revealed to be Walter. He admits Tina is almost as powerful as her mother and allows her to travel to the capital for the entrance exam with Ellie and Allen.
4.5	"Recap: A Look Back"; Transliteration: "Furikaeri Sōshūhen" (Japanese: 振り返り総集編)	N/A	N/A	N/A	August 3, 2025
A recap of the first four episodes featuring audio commentary provided by Yūto Uemura (Allen) and Hime Sawada (Tina).
5	"The Royal Academy at Last, Part 1"; Transliteration: "Akogare no Ōritsu Gakkō Zenpen" (Japanese: 憧れの王立学校 前編)	Takanori Yano	Megumi Shimizu	Mashami Watanabe	August 10, 2025
Allen meets Lydia and congratulates her for passing her court sorcerer exam. Lydia reveals her sister Lynne is taking the same exam as Tina. A week later, Walter proudly announces Ellie and Tina both passed. As such, Allen decides to quit. Walter asks if it is because of his court sorcerer exam, revealing that after Allen defeated his opponent, Prince Gerard, in a mock duel, the prince's ego was bruised. Tina is upset Allen is leaving and impulsively kisses him. Allen's former professor sees this and is able to blackmail Allen into remaining Tina's tutor. Tina is later reunited with her older sister Stella, the student council president. During the entrance ceremony, Allen encounters Lynne as well as her and Lydia's mother, Lisa. With the highest exam score, Tina is asked to give a speech. Allen soon spots his adoptive sister Caren, a wolf-girl of the Wolf Clan who is also on the student council. Tina gives a speech acknowledging her past struggles and her intention to one day surpass Allen. Stella also gives a speech for the incoming students to try their hardest. Word then reaches Allen that Lydia caused a fight.
6	"The Royal Academy at Last, Part 2"; Transliteration: "Akogare no Ōritsu Gakkō Kōhen" (Japanese: 憧れの王立学校 後編)	Noriko Tajiri	Megumu Sasano	Ritera Pictures	August 17, 2025
It is revealed Lydia picked a fight with Gerard for insulting Allen. The King soon arrives, listens to Gerard's arrogance plus explanations from both Lydia and Allen. In the end, he places Gerard and Lydia under house arrest for a month, forbids Allen from entering the royal palace without permission and forbids Gerard from speaking to Lydia or Allen. Tina and Ellie are outraged Allen went to Lydia's home, so they grab Lynne and forcibly invite themselves to her home. Lydia reminds Allen she would renounce her nobility in order to marry him, but until then she insists he visit every day. When Tina and Ellie arrive, Lydia demands that Allen tutor Lynne as well. The Headmaster abruptly hires Allen as an academy instructor, warning him to keep an eye on Gerard, who seems to be pursuing Lynne after Lydia rejected his marriage proposal. In his first lesson, Allen wows Tina's classmates with his advanced spell casting, even though he only has enough mana to cast intermediate spells. At Lydia's house, Allen discovers the perils of trying to tutor three girls at once while being observed by a jealous Lydia.
7	"Extracurricular Lessons at a Hot Spring"; Transliteration: "Kagai Jugyō wa Onsen de" (Japanese: 課外授業は温泉で)	Kazuya Ishiguri	Megumi Shimizu	Ayako Sugi	August 24, 2025
Allen suggests a trip to a hot spring run by his friend Gil Algren. Everyone is disappointed when the hot springs stop working. Tina is surprised Stella is also at the inn with Caren and their friend Felicia Fosse. Tina learns the spellstone used to regulate the spring's temperature has gone missing. With no clues, Allen tracks the stone's mana signature. When Tina asks about Allen and Lydia, Caren explains they met during their entrance exams and Allen helped Lydia become the strongest swordswoman. Allen tracks the stone to a griffin nest keeping the chicks warm. Allen challenges Tina, Lynne, and Ellie to get the stone back without harming the chicks. After a while, they decide to replace the inn's stone with a new stone they create themselves to keep the chicks warm. The mother soon returns but Allen uses Anko to communicate they mean no harm. With the girls having passed his test, Allen decides to give the griffins a new stone from the professor's collection. The spring returns to normal but Tina and Lynne are disappointed everyone else has bigger breasts than them, including Ellie. Elsewhere, Gerard locates an ominous looking dagger.
8	"Imitation"; Transliteration: "Magaimono" (Japanese: マガイモノ)	Kōki Tomari, Mio Nishimura, Yurina Utsugi, Mizuki Sakuma	Rie Kojika	Kōki Tomari	August 31, 2025
At the academy, Gerard demands Lynne marry him, which she refuses. She then challenges him to a duel. Gerard proceeds to lash out at his own friends with the dagger. Once Allen arrives, a vicious battle begins. When Lydia and the Headmaster eventually arrive, the latter reveals the dagger is a royal treasure that contains the remnants of the Great Spell Radiant Shield. Anyone unskilled will turn demonic like Gerard, while it grants temporary immortality to those who are. At Lydia's urging, Allen performs a three way mana link to her and Tina. Tina casts Blizzard Wolf, freezing Gerard solid, then casts Frigid Crane on Lydia, allowing her to use her own family spell Scarlet Sword to sever Gerard's hand, separating him from the dagger. Allen passes out from mana linking with two people simultaneously. Gerard is arrested and Lydia punishes her brother Richard for not doing his job in monitoring Gerard. Tina realizes she has a long way to go before she could help Allen in a real fight like Lydia. Allen reminds her all she can do is improve one step at a time.
9	"A Lightless Road"; Transliteration: "Hikari no Nai Michi" (Japanese: 光のない路)	Noriyo Sasaki	Megumu Sasano	Tomoyuki Mochimune	September 7, 2025
Caren worries about Stella, who is depressed she might never use Supreme Magic like Tina and Lydia. Meanwhile, Allen worries about Frigid Crane. Stella is happy her friend Felicia is well enough to return to school after an illness but still struggles with her depression and jealousy of Tina. In private, her feelings of inadequacy manifest as child versions of herself and Tina. Gil warns Allen he has been drawing attention to himself lately and many troublesome nobles do not like it. Stella throws herself into her work, causing her friends to worry even more. Allen finally tells Tina that Frigid Crane is one of the lost Great Spells and that it seems to have a consciousness of its own. When Tina expresses her concern, Allen assures her it will be fine if she continues working on her mana control. Ellie abruptly asks Allen to mana link with her so she can try an advanced spell. A jealous Lydia links with Allen instead to demonstrate some spells. Stella practices casting a Great Spell but fails repeatedly, upsetting herself further, but decides to keep trying in her mother's memory.
10	"Felicia's Decision"; Transliteration: "Ferishia no Ketsudan" (Japanese: フェリシアの決断)	Takanori Yano	Rie Kojika	Yuri Isowa	September 14, 2025
Allen meets Ernest, President of the Fosse Company and Felicia's father, who wishes to trade Leinster wines and Howard produce. Unfortunately, he presents a poor business plan and Allen is forced to refuse. Felicia, who often helps Ernest with paperwork, blames herself for the situation. Allen finds evidence the Fosse Company's success has a habit of rising and falling sharply for no discernible reason. Felicia meets with Allen and he reveals he worked it out: the Fosse Company only does well when she is at home helping her father. Felicia joins Allen's next meeting with Ernest and arranges a smaller deal. Allen then suggests Felicia should consider a future working directly for the Ducal houses on much larger business deals. Thrilled at the possibilities, Felicia withdraws from school and begins working for the Leinsters and Howards. To show his support, Ernest disowns Felicia so she need not worry about the Fosse Company anymore. Lydia decides to help Ernest with his business matters when needed. Caren and Stella are sad to see Felicia leave but happy for her. The next morning, Caren informs Allen that Stella is missing.
11	"On a Night when the Moon and Stars Shine Bright"; Transliteration: "Tsuki to Hoshi no Kagayaku Yoru ni" (Japanese: 月と星の輝く夜に)	Mizuki Sakuma	Megumi Shimizu	Namako Umino	September 21, 2025
Allen locates Stella quickly and she asks him why he stayed with Lydia. After hearing Allen's explanation, Stella admits to feeling inferior to everyone else. Allen abruptly invites Stella on a date. Stella is confused but enjoys it, which ends at the cathedral. There, they see the stone tablets of the original Great Spells. Allen is shocked Stella learned the names of all eight spells from her mother Rosa, since some of the names were lost centuries ago. For this huge discovery, Allen flies Stella to the cathedral roof to look at the moon and stars. Stella decides to return to school where she challenges Caren, Tina, and Ellie to a battle with Allen on her team. She promises that if she loses, she will have Caren replace her as council president and Tina replace her as the family heir. Allen insists on training Stella for two weeks. During training, Allen realizes Stella's ice magic contains traces of light magic. While he feels confident Stella can beat Tina and Ellie, he believes she will require his help to beat Caren. Stella asks Allen for a favor once the battle is over.
12	"The Girls' Battle"; Transliteration: "Shōjo-tachi no Tatakai" (Japanese: 少女達の戦い)	Arisa Shima	Megumi Shimizu	Namako Umino	September 28, 2025
Lydia fastens a ribbon to Allen's staff, promising to punish him if he lets it get damaged. Lydia's brother Richard and mother Lisa also attend the duel. Stella manages to cast three advanced spells at once. Tina counters with Blizzard Wolf but Allen and Stella counter again by mana linking so Stella can cast the new Supreme Spell Allen invented for her ice and light magic, two Frost-Gleam Hawks. Stella and Caren face off in one large attack and Stella is defeated. Afterward, Stella promises Caren that she will keep improving. Lydia scolds Allen for mana linking to not just Stella, but Tina and Caren as well, giving them the tiny push they needed to bring out their full potentials. Losing her temper, she blows Allen up, with Richard and Gil as collateral damage. For her favor, Stella asks Allen to style her hair, which he sometimes still does for Caren. Allen worries he has nothing left to teach the girls but the professor suddenly reveals Duke Walter has extended his employment contract to include Stella as a student. Meanwhile, a still recovering Gerard swears revenge on Allen.

== Reception ==
Rebecca Silverman of Anime News Network praised the characters and aspects of the plot, while criticizing the "near-loli scenes". Silverman concluded her review stating "[the series is] not bad, it's [just] not all that good either". Sean Gaffney of A Case Suitable for Treatment praised the story, though Gaffney also felt its harem elements were "awkward".

In BookWalker's Next Big Light Novels poll, the series ranked fifth on the bunkobon list in 2019. The series has 200,000 copies in circulation.
