= Kamikamikaeshi =

Japanese manga series

- First tankōbon volume cover

かみかみかえし
- Genre: Romance; Supernatural
- Manga
- Written by: Ema Tōyama
- Published by: Kodansha
- English publisher: NA: Kodansha USA
- Magazine: Nakayosi Lovely (2010–2011); Nakayoshi (2012–2016)
- Original run: May 17, 2010 – April 2, 2016
- Volumes: 8
- icon

Kamikamikaeshi (かみかみかえし) is a Japanese manga series written and illustrated by Ema Tōyama. It was serialized in Kodansha's shōjo manga magazine Nakayosi Lovely (2010–2011) and Nakayoshi (2012–2016). Its chapters were collected in eight tankōbon volumes.

== Publication ==
Written and illustrated by Ema Tōyama, Kamikamikaeshi started in Kodansha's shōjo manga magazine Nakayosi Lovely on May 17, 2010. It was serialized until the magazine's last issue, released on October 17, 2011. It was later serialized in Nakayoshi from February 3, 2012, to April 2, 2016. Kodansha collected its chapters in eight tankōbon volumes, released from June 6, 2011, to June 13, 2016.

In North America, the manga has been licensed for English release by Kodansha USA. The eight volumes were released from June 12, 2018, to February 12, 2019.

=== Volumes ===
| No. | Original release date | Original ISBN | English release date | English ISBN |
|---|---|---|---|---|
| 1 | June 6, 2011 | 978-4-06-364310-7 | June 12, 2018 | 978-1-64212-295-4 |
| 2 | June 6, 2012 | 978-4-06-364354-1 | July 10, 2018 | 978-1-64212-315-9 |
| 3 | July 13, 2013 | 978-4-06-364385-5 | August 14, 2018 | 978-1-64212-428-6 |
| 4 | June 13, 2014 | 978-4-06-364429-6 | September 18, 2018 | 978-1-64212-470-5 |
| 5 | November 13, 2014 | 978-4-06-364448-7 | November 13, 2018 | 978-1-64212-544-3 |
| 6 | June 12, 2015 | 978-4-06-364474-6 | December 11, 2018 | 978-1-64212-577-1 |
| 7 | November 13, 2015 | 978-4-06-364490-6 | January 8, 2019 | 978-1-64212-642-6 |
| 8 | June 13, 2016 | 978-4-06-391516-7 | February 12, 2019 | 978-1-64212-678-5 |
