= Manga Dogs =

Japanese manga series

- First tankōbon volume cover
- Genre: Comedy, slice of life
- Manga
- Written by: Ema Tōyama
- Published by: Kodansha
- English publisher: NA: Kodansha USA
- Magazine: Aria
- Original run: July 28, 2010 – December 28, 2013
- Volumes: 3

Manga Dogs, known in Japan as GDGD-DOGS, is a Japanese manga series written and illustrated by Ema Tōyama. The story follows Kanna, a fifteen-year-old manga artist who, already published as a pro joins her school's new manga course. Trying to finish her deadlines for her ongoing running manga series, she meets three boys who ask her to teach them Manga and have delusions of their own about being manga artists. It was serialized in Kodansha's shōjo manga magazine Aria from July 2010 to December 2013, with its chapters collected in three tankōbon volumes. It was licensed for English release in North America by Kodansha USA. Overall, the series has received mixed reviews.

== Plot ==
Kanna, a 15-year-old manga artist and also a pro who has debuted her manga Teach Me, Buddha! is excited when she finds out that her school is offering a course in manga drawing. She is dismayed however, when her home-room teacher knows little of what she is doing and that there are few people in her class. On her first day she meets three boys, Fumio, Fujio, and Shota who find out that she is a pro by guessing and ask her to be their sensei. Making matters worse for Kanna her manga falls down in popularity ratings and she falls behind on her deadlines. Kanna wonders how she will be able to finish up her manga while having to deal with three delusional guys who want to be manga artists and retain her sanity.

== Characters ==
Kanna Tezuka (手塚 神奈, Tezuka Kanna)
Kanna is a 15-year-old manga artist who has pink tinted hair, purple eyes and hair covering her eyes. Already published as a pro which she chooses to keep a secret, she is happy to find out that her school has started up a manga drawing course. Kanna has a manga series called Teach Me, Buddha! which is running in a Shōjo magazine but is struggling in popularity ranks so she chose to join the manga course to focus her time on her manga. Kanna is at first repulsed by Fumio, Fujio, and Shota but since they found out her secret she reluctantly agrees to teach them manga skills. Things get worse for her when she finds out that her manga is ranked last so her editor asks her to find things moe in the form of guys at her school. Kanna not understanding what he means wishes the guys she is with are 2D rather than in 3D, this changes when Fumio accidentally falls on her shirtless and she sees that 3D can be moe just not for a Shojo manga according to her editor. Kanna admits that she has been bullied when people find out she likes manga and cannot control herself when someone disses her manga, she figures this will be the same with Fumio, Fujio, and Shota but she ends up being wrong. Later on Kanna appears to fall for a new student Joji Yama-uchi who joins the manga class and reminds her of a character from a manga despite warnings that he looks suspicious from the other three boys. Things change however when Joji after finding out about Kanna's debut ties her up and steals her drawings at the end of the first manga.
In chapter 5 it is found out that Kanna wanted to use the pen-name Lolita Princess Bambi but her editor burst out laughing and suggested she use her real name.
Fumio Aka-Tsuka (赤塚 不三夫, Aka-Tsuka Fumio)
Fumio is a guy with blonde hair and green eyes he was born mid-summer and is a Leo. Like Fujio and Shota he is into manga also like them however, he has his delusions about being a manga artist saying that he "wants to be a manga artist so he can buy the manga and read it for work". He guesses Kanna's secret and asks her to teach him along with Fujio, and Shota manga skills". It is shown in chapter 4 that he made Kanna's heart race when he accidentally falls on her. Later on, Fumio wants the pen-name "The Jet-Black Crimson Knight"" but later goes along with "Prince Burly Dolt" a pen-name Kanna gives him when she becomes upset to her later regret and also surprise. Fumio is a fast reader of manga, only reading the last pages of each manga he reads much to Kanna's horror. He later lets slip Kanna's secret to Joji about her being a pro.
Fujio Fuji (不二 藤雄, Fuji Fujio)
Fujio is a 15-year-old guy with brown hair and eyes and who wears glasses. Looking online he finds out that he and Kanna are the same age.
Shota Ishino-Mori (石乃森 翔太, Ishino-Mori Shōta)
Shota is a guy with brown hair and purple eyes.
Joji Yama-uchi (山内 庄二, Yama-uchi Jōji)
Joji is a guy who appears towards the end of volume 1 of the manga, he wears glasses but has a "cute" set of eyes behind them. He soon after finds out that Kanna is a pro manga writer who has made her debut. Joji steals Kanna's drawings at the end of the first volume stating that he "hates anyone who has debuted".

== Publication ==
Written and illustrated by Ema Tōyama, Manga Dogs was serialized in Kodansha's shōjo manga magazine Aria from July 28, 2010, to December 28, 2013. Kodansha collected its chapters in three tankōbon volumes, released from October 6, 2011, to February 6, 2014.

In North America, the manga was licensed for English release by Kodansha USA. The three volumes were released from October 7, 2014, to February 17, 2015.

== Reception ==
The first volume was on the New York Times Best Seller list for a week at No. 10 from October 19–26, 2014. The English-language adaptation of Manga Dogs received mixed reviews, with almost all saying that the series is good for those who understand manga to get all of the references. Rebecca Silverman of Anime News Network gave the first volume a B+ rating praising Toyama's humor in the story and jokes about otaku with great translation notes, but goes on to say that "significant background knowledge" is needed to understand all of the jokes used and called the artwork generic. Manga critic Katherine Dacey from Manga Bookshelf gave it a good review calling it light-hearted and "not for everyone but for the manga obsessed". Myrto Tselenti from Otaku USA magazine gave the series a mixed review calling it a manga about a manga. While he said that "the shojo premise of a socially awkward female protagonist and her attractive male admirers" was an original combo, the shojo aspect does not work so well calling the protagonists "two dimensional clichés". Sakura Eries from the Fandom Post also gave the first volume of the English release a review. She calls Kanna's personality unlikeable, and while the guy characters may provide some laughs they are barely entertaining.
