= A Cat Is a Cat in Any Life =

Japanese manga series

- First wideban volume cover

転生しても猫は猫 (Tenseishite mo Neko wa Neko)
- Genre: Isekai; Fantasy comedy
- Manga
- Written by: Ema Tōyama
- Published by: Square Enix
- English publisher: NA: Square Enix Manga & Books
- Imprint: Gangan Comics Online
- Magazine: Gangan Online
- Original run: March 16, 2021 – May 28, 2024
- Volumes: 2

A Cat Is a Cat in Any Life (転生しても猫は猫, Tenseishite mo Neko wa Neko) is a Japanese manga series written and illustrated by Ema Tōyama. It began publication as a webcomic on Tōyama's Twitter account in June 2020. It was later serialized on Square Enix's Gangan Online manga website from March 2021 to May 2024.

== Synopsis ==
A munchkin cat has been reincarnated to fantasy world without cats after getting hit by a car. After her defeat of the demon lord, the hero returns home and is surprised at the presence of the cat, viewing it as an unfamiliar creature.

== Publication ==
Written and illustrated by Ema Tōyama, A Cat Is a Cat in Any Life was originally published as a webcomic on Tōyama's Twitter account on June 19, 2020. It was later acquired by Square Enix and was serialized on its Gangan Online manga website from March 16, 2021 to May 28, 2024. Its chapters were compiled into two wideban volumes released between March 11, 2022 and July 11, 2024.

During their panel at Anime Expo 2025, Square Enix Manga & Books announced that they had licensed the series for English publication in May 2026.

No.	Original release date	Original ISBN	North American release date	North American ISBN
1	March 11, 2022	978-4-7575-7820-3	May 19, 2026	978-1-6460-9471-4
Chapters 1–23
2	July 11, 2024	978-4-7575-9304-6	May 19, 2026	978-1-6460-9471-4
Chapters 24–44

== Reception ==
Square Enix Manga & Books' release of the series was nominated for Best Publication Design at the 3rd American Manga Awards in 2026.
