= Chihiro-kun Only Has Eyes for Me =

Japanese manga series

- First tankōbon volume cover

千紘くんは、あたし中毒 (Chihiro-kun wa, Atashi Horikku)
- Genre: Romance
- Manga
- Written by: Sato Ito
- Published by: Kodansha
- English publisher: NA: Kodansha USA (digital)
- Magazine: Nakayoshi
- Original run: June 3, 2019 – December 27, 2024
- Volumes: 12
- icon

Chihiro-kun Only Has Eyes for Me (Japanese: 千紘くんは、あたし中毒(ホリック), Hepburn: Chihiro-kun wa, Atashi Horikku) is a Japanese manga series written and illustrated by Sato Ito. It was serialized in Kodansha's shōjo manga magazine Nakayoshi from June 2019 to December 2024, with its chapters collected in twelve tankōbon volumes.

== Publication ==
Written and illustrated by Sato Ito, Chihiro-kun Only Has Eyes for Me was serialized in Kodansha's shōjo manga magazine Nakayoshi on June 3, 2019, to December 27, 2024. Kodansha collected its chapters in twelve tankōbon volumes, released from November 13, 2019, to March 13, 2025.

In North America, the manga has been licensed for English digital release by Kodansha USA.

=== Volumes ===
No.	Original release date	Original ISBN	English release date	English ISBN
1	November 13, 2019	978-4-06-517712-9	August 24, 2021	978-1-63699-305-8
2	March 13, 2020	978-4-06-518679-4	September 28, 2021	978-1-63699-379-9
3	July 13, 2020	978-4-06-520297-5	October 26, 2021	978-1-63699-427-7
4	December 11, 2020	978-4-06-521844-0	November 23, 2021	978-1-63699-475-8
5	May 13, 2021	978-4-06-523245-3	December 28, 2021	978-1-63699-538-0
6	September 13, 2021	978-4-06-524863-8	March 15, 2022	978-1-63699-658-5
7	March 13, 2022	978-4-06-526805-6	September 20, 2022	978-1-68491-451-7
8	October 13, 2022	978-4-06-529531-1	April 4, 2023	978-1-68491-860-7
9	August 10, 2023	978-4-06-532450-9	January 30, 2024	979-8-88933-340-1
10	February 13, 2024	978-4-06-534335-7	June 25, 2024	979-8-88933-576-4
11	August 9, 2024	978-4-06-536613-4	January 28, 2025	979-8-89478-320-8
12	March 13, 2025	978-4-06-538802-0	September 23, 2025	979-8-89478-686-5
