= Instant Teen: Just Add Nuts =

Japanese manga by Haruka Fukushima

- Cover of the first Japanese volume

おとなにナッツ (Otona ni Nattsu/ Otona Ni Nuts)
- Genre: Romance
- Manga
- Written by: Haruka Fukushima
- Published by: Kodansha
- English publisher: NA: Tokyopop
- Magazine: Nakayoshi
- Original run: 2001 – 2002
- Volumes: 4

Instant Teen: Just Add Nuts (おとな に ナッツ, Otona ni Nattsu; lit. Nuts To Make You An Adult) is a Japanese shōjo manga by Haruka Fukushima. The manga was published in English by Tokyopop; the Tokyopop version of the manga is out of print as of August 31, 2009.

In 2009, a spinoff was serialized in Nakayoshi called おとなにナッツー (Otona ni Nattsu ni, lit. Nuts To Make You An Adult Two), with different characters; it has just one volume.

== Story ==
Natsumi Kawashima is a young fifth-grader who longs to grow up and become a woman. While crushing on an older hair stylist, Natsumi is embarrassed because of her age. Natsumi runs away and steals some nuts from a lady handing them out to women only in the mall. When Natsumi is eating the nuts, she notices that some of them are pink. The next morning, Natsumi wakes up with the body of a beautiful young woman. She does not notice her body transformation until her older crush, Toji Yashiki, asks her about being a hair model. They go on a fabulous date after Yashiki gives her a makeover. The next day, Natsumi is "kidnapped" by some college students and finds out that one of them created the nuts she ate earlier. Dr. Yunosuke Morinomiya, the creator of the nuts, forbids Natsumi from eating them due to unknown side-effects. Natsumi disobeys the orders to say goodbye to Yashiki. When Natsumi plans to tell him good bye, he takes her on a cruise for the salon he works at. But while on the cruise, the nuts' effect wears off but instead, Natsumi turns into a baby! Dr. Morinomiya and Natsumi's neighbor, Asuma Yoneyama, return her back to normal. Natsumi says goodbye to Yashiki for good without telling him about the nuts or her real age. Natsumi learns her lesson and as she and Asuma play videogames, she finds out that Asuma sent pictures of her as a young woman to a modeling contest so he could get a game. Natsumi gets a package in the mail and inside it is the nuts. Dr. Morinomiya sent them to her because he finished his project and the nuts no longer had side effects. Natsumi uses the nuts for the photo shoot in the Southern Islands that she had won from the contest.

Later on in the series Natsumi finds out that Asuma actually likes her. Many letters were sent to the author by viewers who wanted Asuma to turn into a man.

== Characters ==
- Natsumi Kawashima (川島夏海, Kawashima Natsumi)

Natsumi is a young 10-year-old girl who just wants to grow up. When she eats Dr. Morinomiya's miracle nuts, she turns into a curvy young woman. Because of her "grown-up" side, she finds herself in several sticky situations, such as almost marrying a billionaire, becoming a model, and starting a rivalry with Dr. Morinomiya's childhood friend. Despite this, her friend Asuma sticks with her. In a special in volume 2, a side-effect of the Miracle Nuts causes her and Asuma to switch bodies. In the final volume, she marries Asuma, but as children, due to Dr. Morinomiya accidentally giving them Miracle Nuts, making them ten years younger, instead of the "Relaxation Nuts".

- Toji Yashiki (屋敷透司)

He is called "an annoying hairstylist" by Asuma. Yashiki is a hairstylist for young women. He is the first suitor for grown-up Natsumi. He tried to kiss Natsumi during a cruise. Natsumi dumped him after the cruise because she realized that looks aren't everything.

- Dr. Yunosuke Morinomiya (森ノ宮勇之助, Morinomiya Yūnosuke)

The creator of the Miracle Nuts. He is often mistaken for a woman. Even though he and Nanao are rival scientists who live on different sides of the world, they get married in the beginning of volume 4, because they realized just how much they missed each other.

- Asuma Yoneyama (米山遊馬, Yoneyama Asuma)

He has loved Natsumi ever since he was little. He gets jealous easily, especially if Natsumi is with another man. In a special in volume 2, a side-effect of the Miracle Nuts causes Asuma to switch bodies with Natsumi. In the final volume, he marries Natsumi. They get married as children because Dr. Morinomiya accidentally replaced the Relaxation Nuts with the experimental version of the Miracle Nuts, which make a person ten years younger.

- Bill Wentz (ビル・ウエンツ)

A rich, genius pretty boy who becomes Natsumi's second suitor. He almost married Natsumi, but Natsumi escaped from the chapel because she realized that money can't buy everything in life.

- Shinobu Nanao (七尾忍)

Dr. Nanao is Dr. Yunosuke Morinomiya's childhood friend. She is often mistaken for a man. Even though she and Yunosuku are rival scientists who live on different sides of the world, they get married in the beginning of volume 4 because they realized just how much they missed each other.

- Karin Amatsu

Karin is in love with Asuma. In a special in volume 2, she tries to get Asuma to like her by pretending to not know how to ski. She then falls on him on purpose and kisses him (however at this time, Natsumi and Asuma had switched bodies due to the side-effects of the Miracle Nuts, so it was really Natsumi she wound up kissing).

- Seki

He has a crush on Natsumi. In a special in volume 2, he was placed next to Karin after he fainted. When they woke up, Karin said, "It was destiny that we found each other all alone in that cottage."

- Mr. Tarumizu

He is Natsumi and Asuma's teacher. He has a bad habit of crying.

== Volumes ==
=== Japanese ===
1. ISBN 4-06-178958-9 published in March 2001
2. ISBN 4-06-178967-8 published in August 2001
3. ISBN 4-06-178980-5 published in January 2002
4. ISBN 4-06-178993-7 published in July 2002
