= Pixie Pop =

Shōjo manga created by Ema Toyama

- The cover of the final volume featuring Mayu (bottom-left), Shinya (top-right) and Pucho (right).

ゴックン!ぷーちょ (Gokkun! Pūcho)
- Genre: Romantic comedy, fantasy, magical girl
- Manga
- Written by: Ema Toyama
- Published by: Kodansha
- English publisher: NA / UK: Tokyopop
- Magazine: Nakayoshi
- Original run: 2004 – 2005
- Volumes: 3

Pixie Pop (Japanese: ゴックン!ぷーちょ, Hepburn: Gokkun! Pūcho) is a shōjo manga created by Ema Toyama. The series was first published in 2004 by Kodansha. Pixie Pop was then later translated and released on 13 February 2007 by Tokyopop.

The series lasted for three volumes and rated for 13 (Teens 13 and/or older) for romance. Although the story's theme mainly focuses on the romance that ensues between the protagonist and her crush, Pixie Pop also contains fantasy elements, such as the existence of drink fairies and magical abilities.

== Plot ==
The story follows the adventures of 12-year-old Mayu Kousaka who is just starting middle school. Her family owns a successful café business, and as such, she is heavily selective about what she drinks. Mayu especially enjoys soda pop, though she is known to like anything that has flavor.

When Mayu goes to her first day of middle school, she finds that she must sit next to her former elementary school crush, Shinya Amamiya. The memory of when he turned her down on the day of elementary school graduation still plagues Mayu's mind, and she is incapable of making any true effort to speak to him.

As Mayu is sitting at the bar, a glass and several cans of pop near her, she begins to reminisce about her first meeting with Shinya, when he helped her find her mother. A single teardrop falls into her glass, turning the pop seven different colors. Figuring it was one of her mother's "experiments", she drinks the strange liquid, and finds it to be disgusting. This is when she sees Pucho, who suddenly appears. As it turns out, Pucho is a magical drink spirit, who had gotten the recipe for the seven-color drink (which is supposed to transform drink fairies into adults). Bitter that Mayu drank it instead of her, Pucho proceeds to terrorize Mayu, who thinks that she's merely dreaming and drinks some cold milk to wake herself up. In all actuality, it turns her into a giant. From that point on, anything Mayu drinks (with the exception of water, although it did turn her invisible one time) will cause her to transform. Many times, Mayu has no control over what she does or says during her transformations, and the only way to undo them is with the magic words spoken by Pucho: "Puppuku Pucho!".

The rest of the series centers around Mayu and Pucho's adventures to uncover the colors of the seven-color drink in order to assemble it again, as it is said that the feelings of love create them. As such, Pucho vows to make Shinya fall in love with Mayu.

== Characters ==
=== Main ===
Mayu Kousaka (香坂 まゆ, Kousaka Mayu)
The twelve-year-old protagonist of the series. She has a mother and a younger brother, and her family owns and runs a café called Clover; her father, though mentioned, never appears. After drinking the seven-color drink, Mayu gains the special ability to transform. She has a long-lasting elementary school crush on Amamiya, and is unsure if he reciprocates her feelings. She is the only one who can see Pucho because of the 7-colored drink.
Mayu's romantic rival is Konoha and weeps constantly because of Konoha's many advances towards Amamiya. In the 3rd volume she tries to make Amamiya jealous by dating Yuuki, and it works, but Amamiya doesn't reveal his true feelings and causes her to get upset. Due to Yuuki's kindness and love it causes one color of the seven colored drink to appear and Mayu thinks she fell in love with him, but Pucho explains that the color represented "being loved". She tries to reject him but finds it hard since he was so kind to her. Yuuki sees her love for Amamiya and tells her to go after him. She confesses her love again and Amamiya kisses her. She and Amamiya get married at the end of the book.
Pucho (ぷーちょ, Pūcho)
The drink fairy responsible for keeping Mayu's family's café in business. She at one time had assembled all of the ingredients for the seven-color drink, ending with the last one, "human tears" (supplied by Mayu), but was late to get to it, and as a consequence, Mayu drank it instead. She has magical abilities, such as an incantation to make Mayu's transformation end (Puppuku Pucho). She is supposedly a powerful drink fairy, due to her mentioning that only the stronger ones can receive the recipe for the seven-color drink. Pucho is sarcastic and strong-minded. Some readers once thought that she was a male due to her tone and use of language. At one time, it is said that her full name is "Pucho Puchocho Puppuku Pikokku". Pucho cannot be seen by normal humans, so when only one color was left in Mayu she was upset since Pucho would disappear and refused to see Shinya and give out the last color. Pucho convinced her they would always be friends and Mayu got the last color. At Mayu's wedding with Shinya, Pucho became an adult by absorbing Mayu's tears of happiness and was able to be seen by humans.
Shinya Amamiya (天宮 真也, Amamiya Shinya)
Mayu's first and only crush since kindergarten. After rejecting her on the day of elementary school graduation, he appears somewhat indifferent to her, though at one point does give her the "okay" to romantically pursue him. He is noted for turning down the popular girl in school, Kanemoto, when she asked him if he would like to go out with her. He also claims that he won't date someone he doesn't know well. He dislikes sweets. Shinya had a crush on Konoha when he was younger, and when he learned she left for America he was devastated and changed into a cold jerk. He fell in love with Mayu because she always loved him no matter how he acted and wanted to return her feelings. When he realized his feelings, was when Mayu went on a date with Yuuki Kakeru to make him jealous. He confronted Mayu about him and when he saw the flower he put in her hair, he congratulated her and it upset Mayu; she thought he didn't care about her. In the end, he confessed to her and kissed her. At the end of the manga, Shinya and Mayu marry each other.
Konoha Hiiragi (柊 このは, Hiiragi Konoha)
Konoha first appears at the end of volume one. She is Shinya's first love. She appears perfect at everything, and gets very jealous of Mayu when she is around her and is persistent in overdoing her in everything. She lived abroad in America for six years before finally returning to Japan. Konoha is the "princess" of the Hiiragi family business and is a bit spoiled at times. Noted perfectionist. She is never seen without Pamo-chan, who is very important to her. In volume 3, she tried to take Shinya to America but he told Konoha that he has fallen in love with Mayu and wishes to stay with her. She accepted the fact that her childhood friend had changed and left Japan. At the end of the book, she returns to Japan to attend Mayu and Shinya's wedding.

=== Minor ===
Pamo-chan
An elephant stuff toy that talks and has a mind of its own. He was given by Shinya to Hiiragi eight years ago, and Hiiragi has kept him close to her ever since then. He considers Mayu Kousaka's rival and often makes bad comments on her. He once fell down on a tree, and Mayu transformed into a ninja to save him as he is noted to be Hiiragi's most important thing from Shinya, however, that did not change how he thinks of Mayu.
Nazuna Hayase
Nazuna is Mayu's best friend. She asked Amamiya-kun to meet Mayu at the playground and persuaded Mayu to confirm her love to him. Of course it didn't work out. Ryouta has a major crush on her. Mayu and Amamiya-kun both tried to help get Nazuna and Ryouta together. In volume 3, she gathered her courage and confessed to Ryouta.
Ryouta Minigawa
Ryouta is Amamiya's best friend. He obviously has a huge crush on Mayu's best friend, Nazuna. In volume 2 they were voted as best couple even though they weren't a couple. Ryouta confessed his love for Nazuna when they had a wedding for winning best couple. After that Nazuna was too shy to speak with him about it. In volume 3 Nazuna confirmed her love to him.
Kakeru Yuuki
Yuuki appears in volume 3. Mayu used him to make Shinya jealous, but she thought it was the power of the 7 colored drink that made him like her-but he actually had a real crush on her for a long time. Mayu felt bad and cried for him, and he explains that he is happy that she was finally looking at him instead of Shinya and kissed her forehead. His affection caused the 7 colored drink to appear, and Mayu to realize his true feelings. He asks her out and Mayu doesn't think she can reject him since he loves her so much. Mayu passes out in a bush, embarrassing Yuuki-while trying to hide from Shinya, from a fever and he carries her to the nurse. Shinya finds them and thinks they are skipping class to be together and tries to take her back to class and gets in an argument with him. When Mayu drinks Vitamin 0, she loses her love for Shinya and completely falls in love with Yuuki. The transformation is undone since her transformations are weak from only having two colors left and her feelings for Shinya come flooding back. Yuuki sees this and tells Mayu to go after him and gives up on her.

== Reception ==
Pixie Pop has generally been received well, as Patricia Beard of The Fandom Post writes that "The mangaka is very clever and funny in her introduction of drinks and their effect on Mayu. This may be a single joke story, but it is well focused and well-paced for a three-volume series."

However, it has been criticised as being predictable. A. E. Sparrow of IGN writes that "It doesn't really break new ground" and "It's fairly obvious she's going to end up with Amamiya".

Leroy Douresseaux of Comic Book Bin enjoyed its humor, and also considered it to be more of a children's comic.
