= I Guess I Became the Mother of the Great Demon King's 10 Children =

Japanese manga series

- First tankōbon volume cover

異世界で最強魔王の子供達10人のママになっちゃいました。 (Isekai de Saikyō Maō no Kodomo-tachi 10-nin no Mama ni Nacchaimashita)
- Genre: Isekai; Romance
- Manga
- Written by: Ema Tōyama
- Published by: Kodansha
- English publisher: NA: Kodansha USA (digital)
- Magazine: Monthly Shōnen Sirius
- Original run: April 26, 2019 – November 25, 2023
- Volumes: 10
- icon

I Guess I Became the Mother of the Great Demon King's 10 Children (Japanese: 異世界で最強魔王の子供達10人のママになっちゃいました。, Hepburn: Isekai de Saikyō Maō no Kodomo-tachi 10-nin no Mama ni Nacchaimashita) is a Japanese manga series written and illustrated by Ema Tōyama. It was serialized in Kodansha's shōnen manga magazine Monthly Shōnen Sirius from April 2019 to November 2023, with its chapters collected in ten tankōbon volumes.

== Summary ==
High school girl Akari mourns the loss of her mother, who shielded her in a hit and run years ago. Deciding to play an adventure game her mother got her long ago, Akari ended up summoned into it as the prophesied saintess by the demons. She has to give birth to Demon Lord Gran's ten children, to lead the demons to victory against the humans. However, the humans think the demons are the evil ones, when the demons are only fighting to keep humans out of their territory, all the while a third race, known as Celestial, observe.

== Characters ==
Akari (朱里)
A high school girl who was summoned to another world, due to her desire to be a mother. Her relationship with Gran starts out poorly, but they start to understand each other through missing their parents. Most of her children were born unnaturally due magical conception. Akari lacks any magical powers, having to rely on her negotiation skills and children.
Akari essentially has her life fast forwarded by the events of the story, skipping out on her remaining carefree adolescence and straight to motherhood. Despite this, Akari is loving mother to her children.
Gran (グラン, Guran)
The current Demon Lord, succeeding his captured mother and missing father; his father was human, also from Akari's world. Due to being forced to mature as a leader early, Gran grew up with diminished empathy. Having Akari teach him about parenting helps Gran soften and focus more on giving his children a happy life.

=== The Children ===
The Children of prophecy are each born with a great skill that can cause destruction. However, it is an exaggeration; their given skills are more about helping others and only a danger if someone corrupts the children. With the exception of the triplets, none of the children were conceived naturally, while the rest were created magically; they are all born of eggs that pop out of Akari via the magic way. Three of them were accidents due to the magical accidents. Akari names them all after French numbers.

An (アン)
The first daughter. She has the skill to be a great cook and can make delicious, nutritional meals. If she succumbs to anger, her definition of "cooking" can be used to manipulate things other than food. An has a massive crush on the hero. She was born from Akari drinking a potion of Gran's magic.
Deux (ドゥー, Dū)
The first son. He has the skill to master any tool. Rather than weapons, Deux works to help produce better harvesting and building tools. He was born by accident due to Akari and Gran sharing a special cookie meant by one of the hero's female companions to trap him with a baby.
Trois (トロワ)
Twin brother of Quatre. He is able to command animals and understand them, keeping the vicious beasts in line and playing with the fluffy ones. He was born by accident when Akari who was wearing his grandmother's magic fertility dress touched Gran.
Quatre (キャトル, Kyatoru)
Twin sister of Trois. She is a master craftsman, able to build anything so long as she has a blueprint. Quatre has a tsundere admiration for Albert. She was born by accident when Akari who was wearing her grandmother's magic fertility dress touched Gran.
Sinq (サンク)
From the moment he was born, Sinq was already aware; his skill is being a brilliant strategist. Sinq is often the voice of reason along with his mother. Born due to the magic effects of hot spring that impregnated women who share a bath with a man.
Six (シス, Shisu)
Born from Akari making a wish for a beacon of hope against the Celestials. Six is a sweet girl whose special skill is medical knowledge. She uses the shapeshifting horn of her grandmother as a multi-purpose tool.
Sept (セト, Seto)
One of the triplets. His skill is being a great artist, able to create accurate likenesses in drawings.
Huit (ユイ, Yui)
One of the triplets. Due to being born naturally, she does not have the same accelerated development as her siblings. However, she has the skill of songstress and inspire hope.
Neuf (ヌフ, Nufu)
One of the triplets. Neuf has the ability to communicate with the ghosts with her seance skill and even allow them to use she body as a vessel. Because of this, spirits often float around Neuf.
Dix (ディー, Dī)
The final child. Born in desperation of his parents to defeat Ciel. His skill is precognition, which he can share with telepathy.

=== Celestials ===
Ciel
Originally a tiny pixie who loved to torment others and feed off their misery. When she met the first hero, Ciel began feeling a bond and ignored her hunger. However, once he fell in love with the demon queen, Ciel flew into a jealousy that made her angrier because she could not eat her own misery. Ciel tricked everyone into killing the queen, with the hero committing suicide in grief. To forget her pain, Ciel created the fake Celestial race and prophecy, in order to feed endless on the misery she caused.

=== Otherworlders ===
Albert
The nominated hero of the human race. After initially thinking Akari is an enslaved rape victim, Albert's blunders eventually lead to him realizing the situation was not what he thought. He joins Akari as an ally to end the war, misunderstanding her words as a romantic claim on him until later in story.
Dernier
The former demon lord and mother to Gran. After her husband disappeared, she misdirected her rage at the humans and got captured. Years later, Akari helped free her and reunite Dernier with Shinichiro.

=== Earth ===
Shinichiro
Lost husband of the demon queen. He came to the other world and fell in love with Derneir, intending to have a proper family. However, when Shinichiro went to parley with Ciel, the pixie sent him back to Earth to make Dernier bitter and extend the war. Akari and the children helped being him back. Despite Derneir desiring more children, Shinichiro refuses as they have too many grandkids already.
Akari's Mother
The single parent who raised Akari until she was killed by a truck. She loved Akari very much, briefly using her granddaughter Six as a vessel to give a proper farewell.

== Publication ==
Written and illustrated by Ema Tōyama, I Guess I Became the Mother of the Great Demon King's 10 Children was serialized in Kodansha's shōnen manga magazine Monthly Shōnen Sirius from April 26, 2019, to November 25, 2023. Kodansha collected its chapters in ten tankōbon volumes, released from December 4, 2019, to December 7, 2023.

In North America, the manga has been licensed for English digital release by Kodansha USA.

=== Volumes ===
No.	Original release date	Original ISBN	English release date	English ISBN
1	December 4, 2019	978-4-06-517841-6	December 15, 2020	978-1-64659-862-5
2	April 9, 2020	978-4-06-518754-8	January 19, 2021	978-1-64659-917-2
3	September 9, 2020	978-4-06-520744-4	February 16, 2021	978-1-64659-962-2
4	February 9, 2021	978-4-06-522153-2	July 20, 2021	978-1-63699-238-9
5	July 8, 2021	978-4-06-523952-0	May 17, 2022	978-1-68491-173-8
6	December 9, 2021	978-4-06-526247-4	October 18, 2022	978-1-68491-497-5
7	July 7, 2022	978-4-06-528441-4	March 7, 2023	978-1-68491-842-3
8	January 6, 2023	978-4-06-530299-6	August 15, 2023	979-8-88933-101-8
9	June 8, 2023	978-4-06-531940-6	January 16, 2024	979-8-88933-330-2
10	December 7, 2023	978-4-06-533923-7	June 4, 2024	979-8-88933-561-0
