= Vampire Dormitory =

Japanese manga series

- First tankōbon volume cover featuring Mito Yamamoto (left) and Ruka Saotome (right)

ヴァンパイア男子寮(ドミトリー) (Vanpaia Domitorī)
- Genre: Fantasy; Romance; Supernatural
- Manga
- Written by: Ema Tōyama
- Published by: Kodansha
- English publisher: NA: Kodansha USA
- Magazine: Nakayoshi
- Original run: November 2, 2018 – June 3, 2024
- Volumes: 14
- Anime television series
- Directed by: Nobuyoshi Nagayama
- Written by: Touko Machida
- Studio: Studio Blanc
- Licensed by: Crunchyroll
- Original network: Tokyo MX, BS NTV, AT-X, MBS
- Original run: April 7, 2024 – June 23, 2024
- Episodes: 12

Vampire Dormitory (Japanese: ヴァンパイア男子寮(ドミトリー), Hepburn: Vanpaia Domitorī) is a Japanese manga series written and illustrated by Ema Tōyama. It was serialized in Kodansha's shōjo manga magazine Nakayoshi from November 2018 to June 2024. An anime television series adaptation produced by Studio Blanc aired from April to June 2024.

== Plot ==
Teenage orphan Mito Yamamoto has spent most of her early childhood living with numerous relatives who saw her as nothing but a burden since her parents died in a house fire when she was a child until years later, she is kicked out by one of her relatives and is forced to fend for herself. Now homeless, she secretly starts sleeping at the ramen shop where she currently works as a waitress at until she fired by her boss for doing so; she then starts cross dressing as a boy to protect herself and prevent drawing unwanted attention from leering strangers. While searching for another job, she suddenly stumbles upon La Fraise, a popular cafe with handsome waiters where she accidentally breaks a vase and cuts her finger, causing it to bleed; one of the waiters Ruka Saotome takes her to the back room to tend to her injury.

Not knowing that she's a female, he licks off the blood from her cut until he feels disgusted from the taste of it, making her leave. Feeling like she has nowhere and no one to turn to, Mito later that night contemplates committing suicide by jumping over a bridge; when she begins having second thoughts she slips and falls off the bridge until she is rescued by Ruka, who is revealed to be a vampire and suddenly bites on her neck, while sucking her blood. Afterwards he comments that the flavor of men's blood tastes gross and the blood of someone who is unloved has a much bitter taste (explaining Mito's cut from earlier), he proposes for Mito to become his thrall to fill this position. Despite being a girl, Mito moves in with Ruka at the dormitory of Hijirigaoka Boys' Academy, where she continues to conceal her real gender by posing as a student on the campus; she then takes up a job at the cafe with Ruka and several others.

== Characters ==
Mito Yamamoto (山本 美人, Yamamoto Mito)
Voiced by: Kana Ichinose (Japanese); Nia Celeste (English)
A teenage orphan who disguises herself as a boy to avoid unwanted attention. Her parents died in a house fire when she was young and one of her relatives kicks her out of their home, forcing her to fend for herself and live on the streets. She secretly starts working at a ramen shop. However, she later gets kicked out by her boss. While searching for another job, she stumbles upon La Fraise, a popular cafe where she meets Ruka Saotome and several others.
Ruka Saotome (早乙女 ルカ, Saotome Ruka)
Voiced by: Shun'ichi Toki (Japanese); Comona Lewin (English)
A vampire who works at La Fraise. Due to his handsome appearance, he is very popular with the girls. When Mito accidentally breaks a vase and cuts her finger, Ruka takes her to the back room to tend her injury, where he licks Mito's blood from her finger. Ruka is disgusted by the taste of Mito's blood, describing her blood to taste like "rotten curry". He offends Mito, causing her to leave. When Mito slips from the bridge where she thought about committing suicide at, Ruka rescues her and suddenly bites her neck and sucks her blood. He explains to Mito that men's blood has a disgusting taste and the blood of someone who is unloved has a taste that is just as bitter and disgusting. He proposes for Mito to become his thrall to fit this position and to make her blood taste better.
Ren Nikaido (二階堂 蓮, Nikaidō Ren)
Voiced by: Yūichirō Umehara (Japanese); Nick Huber (English)
A dhampir who attends the same academy as Mito and Ruka. He has gotten into many fights and is known as a delinquent in school. Due to being born a dhampir, Ren had a hard time finding his place among either humans or vampires. When he was still young, his mother Reiko ended up leaving him to become a full vampire with her husband. He is very protective of Mito and wants her to stay away from Ruka, due to him thinking she will turn into a vampire if Ruka keeps sucking her blood.
Komori (小森)
Voiced by: Wataru Hatano (Japanese); Bradley Gareth (English)
Takara Kagurazaka (神楽坂 宝, Kagurazaka Takara)
Voiced by: Yusuke Shirai (Japanese); Matt Shipman (English)
Juri (樹里)
Voiced by: Yuki Sakakihara (Japanese); Lexi Nieto (English)

== Media ==
=== Manga ===
Written and illustrated by Ema Tōyama, Vampire Dormitory began serialization in Kodansha's shōjo manga magazine Nakayoshi on November 2, 2018. The series ended its first part on July 1, 2022, and began its second part on December 1 that year. The series ended serialization on June 3, 2024. Its chapters were collected into fourteen tankōbon volumes from April 12, 2019, to July 11, 2024.

During their 2019 San Diego Comic-Con panel, Kodansha USA announced that they licensed the manga in a digital-only format. On March 24, 2021, Kodansha USA announced a print release would be released in Q4 2021.

No.	Original release date	Original ISBN	North American release date	North American ISBN
1	April 12, 2019	978-4-06-515037-5	August 20, 2019 (digital); October 19, 2021 (print)	978-1-64-651329-1
2	August 9, 2019	978-4-06-516756-4	October 22, 2019 (digital); December 28, 2021 (print)	978-1-64-651330-7
3	December 13, 2019	978-4-06-518032-7	March 24, 2020 (digital); February 1, 2022 (print)	978-1-64-651331-4
4	June 11, 2020	978-4-06-519929-9	October 13, 2020 (digital); April 5, 2022 (print)	978-1-64-651332-1
5	October 13, 2020	978-4-06-520801-4	April 6, 2021 (digital); June 7, 2022 (print)	978-1-64-651333-8
6	February 12, 2021	978-4-06-522277-5	July 13, 2021 (digital); August 9, 2022 (print)	978-1-64-651613-1
7	June 11, 2021	978-4-06-523619-2	December 14, 2021 (digital); October 11, 2022 (print)	978-1-64-651614-8
8	October 13, 2021	978-4-06-525688-6	March 8, 2022 (digital); December 6, 2022 (print)	978-1-64-651615-5
9	March 11, 2022	978-4-06-527351-7	September 6, 2022 (digital); February 7, 2023 (print)	978-1-64-651734-3
10	August 12, 2022	978-4-06-528484-1	January 31, 2023 (digital); June 20, 2023 (print)	978-1-64-651735-0
11	June 13, 2023	978-4-06-532202-4	May 21, 2024 (digital); May 28, 2024 (print)	979-8-88-877081-8
12	November 13, 2023	978-4-06-533674-8	November 19, 2024	979-8-88-877082-5
13	March 13, 2024	978-4-06-534967-0	May 27, 2025	979-8-88-877404-5
14	July 11, 2024	978-4-06-536189-4	July 29, 2025	979-8-88-877469-4

=== Anime ===
An anime television series adaptation was announced on October 30, 2023. It is animated by Studio Blanc and directed by Nobuyoshi Nagayama, with scripts written by Touko Machida, and character designs handled by Naomi Tsuruta. It aired from April 7 to June 23, 2024, on Tokyo MX and other networks. The opening theme song is "Sugar Blood Kiss", performed by Fantastics, while the ending theme song is "Mata Ashita" (また あした; "See You Tomorrow"), performed by Every Little Thing. Crunchyroll licensed the series. As of July 2024, the anime has adapted the first 6 tankōbons. (Note: Until Chapter 22)

==== Episodes ====
No.	Title (Note: All English titles are taken from Crunchyroll.)	Directed by	Written by	Storyboarded by	Original release date
1	"The pretty boy gets picked up." Transliteration: "Bishōnen, Hirowareru." (Japanese: 美少年、拾われる。)	Kazuya Ishiguri	Touko Machida	Nobuyoshi Nagayama	April 7, 2024
2	"The pretty boy is targeted." Transliteration: "Bishōnen, Nerawareru." (Japanese: 美少年、狙われる。)	Ayako Sugi	Touko Machida	Daigo Kinoshita	April 14, 2024
3	"The pretty boy stays over." Transliteration: "Bishōnen, O Tomari Suru." (Japanese: 美少年、お泊まりする。)	Kazuya Ishikuri	Touko Machida	Kazuya Ishikuri	April 21, 2024
4	"The pretty boy becomes friends." Transliteration: "Bishōnen, Tomodachi ni Naru." (Japanese: 美少年、友だちになる。)	Takanori Yano	Misaki Morie	Teru Ishii	April 28, 2024
5	"The pretty boy runs away from home." Transliteration: "Bishōnen, Iede Suru." (Japanese: 美少年、家出する。)	Kenya Ueno	Rie Uehara	Akiyoshi Watari	May 5, 2024
6	"The pretty boy is heartbroken?!" Transliteration: "Bishōnen, Shitsuren Suru!?" (Japanese: 美少年、失恋する！？)	Teru Ishii	Michiko Yokote	Teru Ishii	May 12, 2024
7	"The pretty boy goes on a date." Transliteration: "Bishōnen, Dēto Suru." (Japanese: 美少年、デートする。)	Kazuya Ishiguri	Misaki Morie	Kazuya Ishiguri	May 19, 2024
8	"The pretty boy has a fateful encounter." Transliteration: "Bishōnen, Unmei no Deai o Suru." (Japanese: 美少年、運命の出会いをする。)	Ayako Sugi	Rie Uehara	Kenichi Nishida	May 26, 2024
9	"The pretty boy goes to a party." Transliteration: "Bishōnen, Pātī ni Iku." (Japanese: 美少年、パーティーにいく。)	Shiro Izumi	Michiko Yokote	Teru Ishii	June 2, 2024
10	"The pretty boy transforms." Transliteration: "Bishōnen, Henshin Suru." (Japanese: 美少年、変身する。)	Takanori Yano	Michiko Yokote	Akiyoshi Watari	June 9, 2024
11	"The pretty boy drowns." Transliteration: "Bishōnen, Oboreru." (Japanese: 美少年、溺れる。)	Tatsumi Mukaiyama	Touko Machida	Kenichi Nishida	June 16, 2024
12	"The pretty boy vows!?" Transliteration: "Bishōnen, Chikau!?" (Japanese: 美少年、誓う！？)	Kazuya Ishiguri	Touko Machida	Yuri Isowa	June 23, 2024

== Literary style ==
According to writer Mina Sugimura, the series blends popular elements like the "reverse harem school setting", "a girl disguised as a boy", and "vampires", making it a classic example of shōjo manga done right. While stories with so many themes can sometimes feel overstuffed, this one stays accessible thanks to its clear dialogue and storytelling. The cast of unique and attractive male characters is another major draw, and the love triangle, along with the attention given to supporting characters, adds to the overall appeal.
