= I Am Here! =

Japanese manga series

- The cover of first volume of Koko ni Iru yo! manga published by Kodansha.

ココにいるよ! (Koko ni Iru yo!)
- Genre: Romance, Slice of life
- Manga
- Written by: Ema Tōyama
- Published by: Kodansha
- English publisher: NA: Kodansha USA
- Magazine: Nakayoshi
- Original run: July 2007 – January 2009
- Volumes: 5 (2 English translation)

I Am Here! (Japanese: ココにいるよ!, Hepburn: Koko ni Iru yo!) is a Japanese shōjo manga series by Ema Tōyama. The series was serialized in the shōjo manga magazine, Nakayoshi. The series ended with 5 volumes released by Kodansha under the imprint, Kodansha Comics.

It was announced in the New York Anime Festival 2009 that the series will be licensed in English by Del Rey Manga and the release for the first volume will be November 23, 2010. They titled it "I Am Here!". As of today only two of the five volumes are available in English.

== Story ==
The series centers on a girl named Hikage who describes herself as "plain". She is a very shy and insecure child. Because of her unassertive attitude and unappreciated beauty, she finds herself constantly ignored by her classmates and has a difficult time making friends at school.

In the first chapter of the manga, Hikage begins middle school, vowing to overcome her loneliness and find companionship. Then Hinata starts to notice her in the first volume. She is supported in her ambitions by two online friends, Black Rabbit and Mega Pig, who read her blog about the sunflower shes been nurturing. A romantic and sad plot soon develops involving Hikage and the two most popular boys in her class, Hinata and Teru, who have more to them than meets the eye.

A few bumps occur along the way as Hikage grows closer to Hinata, such as bullying and gossip. When she later sticks up for herself she gains recognition and friendliness from the class, but most importantly she obtains confidence in herself.

== Characters ==
Hikage Sumino (隅乃ひかげ, Sumino Hikage)
Hikage has brown hair and blue eyes, and is a shy, plain 8th grader. The only friends she has at the beginning of the series are the people who visit her blog. They are "MegaPIG" and "Black Rabbit". Ever since she was little she has never been noticed (she appears to be practically invisible in her class) as we see in a game of hide and seek. She doesn't seem to know that Teru is Black Rabbit in her blog until later on when he tells her. What will happen afterwards....?
Hinata Mutō (武藤日向, Mutō Hinata)
A popular boy who likes Hikage. He is considered to be more serious than Teru, and ranks high in exams. He is also on the Kendo team. Hinata states he has always been watching Hikage since the very start of the year and tells her about how he felt when he first saw her. He felt jealous when Hikage started talking about her friends in the blog, Black Rabbit and MegaPIG. In chapter 14, it's revealed when Hinata was a child he used to be a lonely person. He told Teru was like a Black rabbit because Teru is popular but doesn't actually have any friends (when they were young.) He then admits that he's afraid of becoming Teru's love rival but he tells Teru that he will never give up Sumino.
Teru Mikami (三上輝, Mikami Teru)
Another of Hinata's friends, who is also popular. Known for his jokes and charming personality. Teru speaks bluntly and seems to care for Hikage. He always cares about Hikage's change and supports her in her blog. He found Sumino's blog accidentally and has been supporting her since. After when Hikage and Hinata got together, Teru said goodbye to Hikage in her blog because he felt that Sumino no longer needs him since she already has Hinata by her side. Later on, Teru tells Hikage that he is Black Rabbit. When he was a child he never had a true friend until Hinata who compared him to a lonely black rabbit. His parents had fought very much and believed it was his fault the marriage didn't work out. He is currently the love rival of Hinata. He was rejected by Sumino when she realized her own feelings for the two of them, but he does not intend to give up on Sumino and occasionally threatens Hinata as his rival.
Aoi Nanjō (南条葵, Nanjō Aoi)
A guy who is under the alias as MegaPIG in Hikage's blog. He speaks in a Kansai accent. Even though he says if he was 200 kg, in truth he isn't. He just afraid of telling Hikage about his real appearance. He appears cool but rude to girls because he doesn't often smile. Although he is aggressive on the internet he is really a shy person. Appears in a one-shot following the conclusion of the manga.
Arisa Tanaka (田中ありさ, Tanaka Arisa)
The first girl in Hikage's class to greet her. In school she was the first to warm up to Hikage. Even though her test scores are bad, she worked hard to see the fireworks with Hikage. "Suminon" is the name she calls Hikage by, as adding an n to the end of someone's name in Japanese culture is a form of friendly affection.
Aya Fujinaga (藤永彩, Fujinaga Aya)
Aya is a part of Hinata's most popular fan group. She begins to bully Sumino after discovering Sumino and Hinata's relationship starts to bloom. She becomes jealous and decides to turn the whole class against. Sumino, for the first time in her life, stood up and defended herself. Soon, the class realizes Aya is being a bully and shuns her. As a result, Aya is now alone and is out to get revenge on Sumino's relationships with Teru and Hinata.

== Reception ==
Volume 2 of the manga, I Am Here, ranked number 10 on The New York Times' manga best sellers list for the week of July 24–30, 2011.
