= Life Lessons with Uramichi Oniisan =

Japanese manga series

- Cover of Life Lessons with Uramichi Oniisan volume 1 by Ichijinsha

うらみちお兄さん (Uramichi Oniisan)
- Genre: Black comedy
- Manga
- Written by: Gaku Kuze
- Published by: Ichijinsha
- English publisher: NA: Kodansha USA
- Magazine: Comic Pool
- Original run: May 12, 2017 – present
- Volumes: 12
- Anime television series
- Directed by: Nobuyoshi Nagayama
- Written by: Touko Machida
- Music by: Kei Haneoka
- Studio: Studio Blanc
- Licensed by: Crunchyroll
- Original network: TV Tokyo, BS11, Wowow, HTB, Animax
- Original run: July 6, 2021 – September 28, 2021
- Episodes: 13
- icon

Life Lessons with Uramichi Oniisan (Japanese: うらみちお兄さん, Hepburn: Uramichi Onii-san; 'Big Bro Uramichi') is a Japanese comedy manga series written and illustrated by Gaku Kuze. It has been serialized online via Ichijinsha's Comic Pool digital manga magazine since May 2017. Chapters have been collected in twelve tankōbon volumes. The manga series has been licensed in North America by Kodansha USA. An anime television series adaptation produced by Studio Blanc aired from July to September 2021.

== Synopsis ==
Uramichi Omota, a 31-year-old former professional gymnast, works as the leader of the exercise segment of the children's show Together with Maman (a parody of Okaasan to Issho). Despite keeping an upbeat persona on the show, he cannot help but reveal his true, jaded, worn-out personality.

== Characters ==
Uramichi Omota (表田裏道, Omota Uramichi)
Voiced by: Hiroshi Kamiya (Japanese); Adam Gibbs (English)
The Gymnastic Onii-san of the children's show Together with Maman, he is usually simply called "Uramichi Onii-san". Uramichi is a handsome 31-year old former gymnast who is physically well built with a refreshing smile, but is actually mentally unstable. Despite keeping an upbeat personality on the show, he cannot help but reveal his resentful and nihilistic worldview, often telling the children the sorrows of being an adult. He is a smoker and heavy drinker, and his only hobby is muscle training, but he hates this being pointed out.
Tobikichi Usahara (兎原跳吉, Usahara Tobikichi)
Voiced by: Tomokazu Sugita (Japanese); Ray Chase (English)
Tobikichi is a 28-year-old man who plays a rabbit mascot called "Usao" in Together with Maman. Along with Mitsuo, he was Uramichi's junior in college. As a running gag, he is often caught about to bad-mouth Uramichi.
Mitsuo Kumatani (熊谷みつ夫, Kumatani Mitsuo)
Voiced by: Yuichi Nakamura (Japanese); Howard Wang (English)
Mitsuo is a 28-year old man who works under a bear costume called "Kumao" in Together with Maman. Along with Tobikichi, he was Uramichi's junior during college. Kumatani has a soft spot for Iketeru, often protecting him from pranks.
Iketeru Daga (蛇賀池照, Daga Iketeru)
Voiced by: Mamoru Miyano (Japanese); Brandon McInnis (English)
The "Singing Onii-san" of Together with Maman who is also a former musical actor. Despite being good-looking, Iketeru loves childish dirty jokes and is apparently unable to read analog watches. Although he can be dense, he possesses a lot of hidden skills such as acting ability, drawing and ping pong.
Utano Tadano (多田野詩乃, Tadano Utano)
Voiced by: Nana Mizuki (Japanese); Jessica Calvello (English)
A 32-year old "Singing Onee-san" of Together with Maman. Utano is an elite graduate of a music college, but due to bad luck and timing she keeps changing jobs from idol, enka singer, and jazz singer. She is currently living together with her boyfriend of 6 years, who is an unpopular comedian.
Hanbee Kikaku (木角半兵衛, Kikaku Hanbee)
Voiced by: Ryōhei Kimura (Japanese); Johnny Yong Bosch (English)
Saito Uebu (上武裁人, Uebu Saito)
Voiced by: Kenichi Suzumura
Matahiko Nekota (猫田又彦, Nekota Matahiko)
Voiced by: Daisuke Ono (Japanese) (Japanese); Jacob Hopkins (English)
Yusao Furode (風呂出油佐男, Furobe Yusao)
Voiced by: Shin-ichiro Miki
Tekito Derekida (出木田適人, Derekida Tekito)
Voiced by: Kenyu Horiuchi (Japanese); Eric Vale (English)
Eddy Edei (枝泥エディ, Edei Edi)
Voiced by: Natsuki Hanae (Japanese); Kevin Thelwell (English)
Kayo Ennoshita (縁ノ下カヨ, Ennoshita Kayo)
Voiced by: Minami Takahashi
Ikuko Heame (辺雨育子, Heame Ikuko)
Voiced by: Rina Satō
Furitsuke Capellini (カッペリーニ降漬, Kapperīni Furitsuke)
Voiced by: Kazuya Nakai
Amon (アモン, Amon)
Voiced by: Kenjiro Tsuda
Mabui Daga (蛇賀眩衣, Daga Mabui)
Voiced by: Yoko Hikasa
Sayuri (小百合, Sayuri)
Voiced by: Sayuri Sadaoka
The Voice of God (神の声, Kami no Koe)
Voiced by: Hōchū Ōtsuka (Japanese); Kent Williams (English)

== Media ==
=== Manga ===
Life Lessons with Uramichi Oniisan is written and illustrated by Gaku Kuze. It has been serialized online in Ichijinsha's Comic Pool digital manga magazine since May 12, 2017. Chapters have been collected in twelve tankōbon volumes. During their Anime NYC 2019 panel, Kodansha USA announced that they had licensed the series.

==== Volumes ====
No.	Original release date	Original ISBN	English release date	English ISBN
1	September 27, 2017	978-4-7580-1575-2	December 8, 2020	978-1-64651-114-3
2	April 27, 2018	978-4-7580-1597-4	December 8, 2020	978-1-64651-114-3
3	January 29, 2019	978-4-7580-1628-5	January 19, 2021	978-1-64651-140-2
4	October 29, 2019	978-4-7580-1666-7	January 19, 2021	978-1-64651-140-2
5	May 29, 2020	978-4-7580-1693-3 (regular edition); 978-4-7580-1694-0 (special edition)	February 22, 2022	978-1-64651-261-4
6	June 21, 2021	978-4-7580-1722-0 (regular edition); 978-4-7580-1723-7 (special edition)	February 22, 2022	978-1-64651-261-4
7	January 28, 2022	978-4-7580-1756-5	May 2, 2023	978-1-64651-752-7
8	October 19, 2022	978-4-7580-1778-7 (regular edition); 978-4-7580-1779-4 (special edition)	May 2, 2023	978-1-64651-752-7
9	July 21, 2023	978-4-7580-1825-8	May 20, 2025	979-8-88877-243-0
10	July 31, 2024	978-4-7580-1902-6	May 20, 2025	979-8-88877-243-0
11	May 30, 2025	978-4-7580-1994-1	—	—
12	February 27, 2026	978-4-7580-8969-2	—	—

=== Anime ===
An anime adaptation was announced in a promotional video of the fourth volume of the manga on October 25, 2019. The television series is animated by Studio Blanc and directed by Nobuyoshi Nagayama, with Touko Machida handling series composition, Mizuki Takahashi and Yusuke Shibata designing the characters, and Kei Haneoka composing the series' music. It was scheduled to premiere in 2020, but was delayed to 2021 due to "production issues". The series aired from July 6 to September 28, 2021, on TV Tokyo and other channels. Mamoru Miyano and Nana Mizuki performed the opening theme song, "ABC Taisō" (ABC Exercises) as their respective characters, while Miyano also performed the ending theme song "Dream on". Funimation licensed the series. Following Sony's acquisition of Crunchyroll, the series was moved to Crunchyroll.

==== Episodes ====
No.	Title (Note: All English titles are taken from Funimation.)	Directed by	Written by	Storyboarded by	Original release date (Note: Episodes are released every Tuesday at 12:00 a.m. JST on d Anime Store and Hulu Japan, an hour and 30 minutes before the original air time on TV Tokyo.)
1	"Uramichi-oniisan"; Transliteration: "Uramichi Onii-san" (Japanese: うらみちお兄さん)	Ryōsuke Shibuya	Tōko Machida	Yoshinobu Nagayama	July 6, 2021
2	"Senpai and Kohai"; Transliteration: "Senpai to Kōhai" (Japanese: 先輩と後輩)	Hidetoshi Takahashi	Tōko Machida	Akihiro Saitō	July 13, 2021
3	"Wash Your Hands and Gargle"; Transliteration: "Tearai Ugai wa Taisetsu ni" (Japanese: 手洗いうがいは大切に)	Yūsuke Shibata	Misaki Morie	Yūsuke Shibata	July 20, 2021 (Note: This episode aired at 1:40 a.m. JST, 10 minutes after the original air time on TV Tokyo.)
4	"Long, Hot Summer"; Transliteration: "Endoresu Mōsho" (Japanese: エンドレス猛暑)	Ryōsuke Shibuya	Rie Uehara	Ryōsuke Shibuya, Kanae Aoki, Tomari Kōki, Kazuya Ishiguri	July 27, 2021
5	"Once This Concert Is Over…"; Transliteration: "Kono Kōen ga Owattara" (Japanese: この公演が終わったら)	Yūsuke Shibata, Kazuya Ishiguri, Kanae Aoki, Tomari Kōki	Tōko Machida	Yoshinobu Nagayama, Kazuya Ishiguri, Kanae Aoki, Tomari Kōki	August 3, 2021
6	"That Thing That You Can't Remember the Name Of"; Transliteration: "Omoidasenai Rei no Are" (Japanese: 思い出せない例のあれ)	Tomari Kōki, Kazuya Ishiguri	Rie Uehara	Akihiro Saitō	August 10, 2021
7	"I Can Do It by Myself"; Transliteration: "Hitori de Dekirumon" (Japanese: 一人でできるもん)	Yūsuke Shibata, Tomari Kōki, Kanae Aoki, Kazuya Ishiguri	Misaki Morie	Yūsuke Shibata, Tomari Kōki, Kanae Aoki, Kazuya Ishiguri	August 17, 2021
8	"Servility and Conscience"; Transliteration: "Sontaku to Ryōshin" (Japanese: 忖度と良心)	Tomari Kōki, Kanae Aoki	Misaki Morie	Taizō Yoshida	August 24, 2021 (Note: This episode aired at 1:35 a.m. JST, 5 minutes after the original air time on TV Tokyo.)
9	"Young People These Days"; Transliteration: "Saikin no Wakai Ko" (Japanese: 最近の若い子)	Kanae Aoki, Kazuya Ishiguri, Tomari Kōki, Ryūta Yamamoto	Rie Uehara	Taizō Yoshida	August 31, 2021
10	"Subzero Spiral"; Transliteration: "Gokkan Supairaru" (Japanese: 極寒スパイラル)	Ryōsuke Shibuya, Kanae Aoki, Kazuya Ishiguri	Rie Uehara	Ryōsuke Shibuya, Tomari Kōki, Kanae Aoki, Kazuya Ishiguri	September 7, 2021
11	"Fateful Encounter"; Transliteration: "Unmei no Deai" (Japanese: 運命の出会い)	Takayuki Murakami	Tōko Machida	Gorō Kuji	September 14, 2021
12	"Awkward Smile"; Transliteration: "Bukiyō na Egao" (Japanese: 不器用な笑顔)	Tomari Kōki, Kanae Aoki, Kazuya Ishiguri	Misaki Morie	Yūsuke Shibata, Tomari Kōki, Kanae Aoki, Kazuya Ishiguri	September 21, 2021
13	"Together with Maman Forever"; Transliteration: "Fōebā "Maman to Tugyazā"" (Japanese: Forever『ママンとトゥギャザー』)	Yūsuke Shibata, Tomari Kōki, Kanae Aoki, Kazuya Ishiguri	Tōko Machida	Yūsuke Shibata, Tomari Kōki, Kanae Aoki, Kazuya Ishiguri	September 28, 2021

== Reception ==
In 2017, the manga won the Next Manga Award in the web manga category. It ranked sixth on AnimeJapan's "Most Wanted Anime Adaptation" poll in 2019. Rebecca Silverman of Anime News Network published a positive review of the two omnibus editions of the manga in 2021. She wrote that: "Simply put, Life Lessons with Uramichi Oniisan works because it melds absurdity with a dash of realism while reminding readers of their own experiences with children's programming. It does take a while to get going, but by the end of the second book, it has achieved just the right mix of humor and cynicism."

The anime adaptation's first episode garnered mixed reviews from Anime News Network's staff during the Summer 2021 season previews. Richard Eisenbeis praised the portrayal of Uramichi being more "depressed and disillusioned than [as] an asshole" and the treatment of the other characters' predicament being "equal parts funny and sad", saying that fans of Sayonara, Zetsubou-Sensei will enjoy this series. Caitlin Moore was critical of the inappropriate humor said towards young children and the comic timing being "a little bit off" and diminishing the impact of the jokes. James Beckett felt the show didn't "play[s] up the absurdity of its central joke enough" to offset the lack of other jokes throughout the runtime, despite giving praise to the "understated" delivery and Mamoru Miyano giving a "naturalistic" performance as Iketeru. Lynzee Loveridge wrote that the series will appeal to people who enjoy its brand of dark humor, saying that: "If you find this funny, it also probably says something about you and your personal life experiences, your outlook on the world at large." Silverman found the early parts of the episode unfunny because of the focus on Uramichi's bleak outlook but was hopeful of his supporting cast balancing the humor, concluding that: "[T]he contrasts between the colors of the show and Uramichi's dark moments are good, and I like the vocal cast's delivery, but I'm having a hard time getting behind this episode in general. It does get better, but getting there could be a schlep." Nicholas Dupree said that despite a few gags landing its spot, he felt the premiere was hampered by its structure of shorter segments undercutting Uramichi's comments and lacking in quality punchlines, concluding that: "It's a pity, because this past year has had me in the mood for darker humor more than ever, but so far Uramichi Oniisan just hasn't delivered."

Silverman reviewed the complete anime series in 2022 and gave it a B−grade. While finding fault in the "limited animation", the portrayals of Derekida and Capellini, and the limited appeal of its central premise, she praised Uramichi and Together with Maman's programming for making up "a winning combination" for one of the series' best jokes, the "solid vocal performances" from the cast and the subtle details in the characters' past and background jokes, concluding that: "I do think it may work a bit better in its original manga form, but no matter how you experience it, this is probably a love-it-or-hate-it kind of show." The series was nominated for Best Comedy at the 6th Crunchyroll Anime Awards, but lost to Komi Can't Communicate.
