= Kedamono Damono =

2004 manga by Haruka Fukushima

- First tankōbon volume cover

けだものだもの (Kedamono da mono)
- Genre: Romantic comedy, yuri
- Manga
- Written by: Haruka Fukushima
- Published by: Kodansha
- English publisher: NA: Tokyopop
- Magazine: Nakayoshi
- Original run: 2004 – 2007
- Volumes: 3

Kedamono Damono (けだもの だもの, Kedamono da mono) is a Japanese manga series written by Haruka Fukushima. It was serialized in the shōjo manga magazine Nakayoshi from 2004 to 2007. All three volumes have been released in North America by Tokyopop. The story revolves around the relationship between a boy, Haruki Sugimoto, and a girl, Konatsu Narumiya. Haruki is forced by urges to change genders at night, turning into Haruko. While his alter-ego takes over, the urges to flirt with Konatsu completely take over even as he is a girl.

== Plot ==
Konatsu is the manager of the basketball team at her school and has a crush on the team's captain, however it's just her luck that he ends up being a complete jerk. After confiding in another team member named Haruki about her troubles they start to better understand each other, this causes Konastu to learn that Haruki is a cool and ordinary boy by day, but a perverted girl by night.
