= Ema Tōyama =

Japanese manga artist

- Born: May 23, 1981 (age 45) Tokyo, Japan
- Area: Manga artist
- Notable works: Missions of Love

Ema Tōyama (遠山えま, Tōyama Ema; born May 23, 1981 in Tokyo, Japan) is a Japanese manga artist and illustrator. She made her debut in September 2003 in the monthly manga magazine Nakayoshi with her story, Tenshi no Tamago ("Angel's Egg", no relation to the anime movie of the same name). Tokyopop licensed her first serialized manga Gokkun! Pūcho under the title Pixie Pop. Almost all of her works are published by Kodansha.

== Works ==
=== Manga ===
Publisher	Title	Serialization	Volume list	Source	Note
Kodansha's Nakayoshi	Gokkun! Pucho (ゴックン!ぷーちょ)	April 2004–July 2005	3		
Kodansha's Nakayoshi	Mama Kore (ママコレ)	September 2005–March 2007	4		
Kodansha's Nakayoshi	I Am Here! (ココにいるよ!, Koko ni Iru yo!)	July 2007–January 2009	5		
Dengeki Comics	1 Love 9 (1ラブ9)	March 2008–April 2010	3		
Gangan Online	Hyakuen! (ひゃくえん！; lit. 100 Yen!)	April 16, 2009–December 27, 2012	6		
Kodansha's Nakayoshi	Missions of Love (わたしに××しなさい!, Watashi ni xx Shinasai!)	June 2009–July 2015	19		Best Children's Manga, 36th Annual Kodansha Manga Awards.
Houbunsha's Manga Time Kirara	Pocha Pocha Suiei-bu (ぽちゃぽちゃ水泳部)	May 2010–April 2015	5		4-koma manga
Kodansha's Nakayoshi Lovely and Nakayoshi	Kamikamikaeshi (かみかみかえし)	2010–2012 (Nakayoshi Lovely); March 2010–May 2016 (Nakayoshi)	8		
Kodansha's Aria	Manga Dogs (GDGD-Dogs)	September 2010–February 2014	3		
Houbunsha's Manga Time Jumbo	Kitsune to Pancake (きつねとパンケーキ; lit. 'Fox and Pancake')	April 2014–January 2018	2		
Kodansha's Aria	Watanuki-san ni wa Boku ga Tarinai (四月一日さんには僕がたりない)	July 2014–October 2017	5		
Kodansha's Nakayoshi	Aoba-kun ni Kikitai Koto (青葉くんに聞きたいこと; lit. 'Things I want to tell Aoba-kun')	December 2015–June 2018	5		
Houbunsha's Manga Time Kirara	Imōto no Oshigoto wa Jikyū 2000-en (妹のおシゴトは時給2000円; lit. 'Hourly Pay for Job as Little Sister is 2000 Yen')	September 2016–present	2		4-koma manga
Kodansha's Nakayoshi	Vampire Dormitory (ヴァンパイア男子寮(ドミトリー))	November 2018–June 2024	14		
Kodansha's Monthly Shōnen Sirius	I Guess I Became the Mother of the Great Demon King's 10 Children (異世界で最強魔王の子供達10人のママになっちゃいました, Isekai de Saikyō Maō no Kodomo-tachi 10-nin no Mama ni Nacchaimashita.)	April 2019–November 2023	10	-	
Gangan Online	A Cat Is a Cat in Any Life (転生しても猫は猫, Tenseishite mo Neko wa Neko)	March 2021–May 2024	2	-	

==== Others ====
Release date	Publisher	Title	Note
December 13, 2014	Kodansha	Jimikoi (complete reading collection) (ジミコイ（読みきり集）; lit. 'Plain Love')	Contains 4 oneshot stories: Jimikoi, Columbus no Yūtsu, Mimimoto ni Kimi no Koe, and Gojōzaka-san chi no Kirei na Himitsu.

==== Contribution ====
Released	Publisher	Title	Book	Note	Source
August 2014	Kodansha's Aria	Kimi to Nadekko! (キミとなでっこ！)	Anime Monogatari Series Heroine Book #4: Nadeko	Also included in the Blu-ray and DVD volume 2 of Koimonogatari, released on July 23, 2014	
2015	Kodansha's Aria	Abu★nai Hōkago (あぶ★ナイ放課後)	Neo Parasyte F	Collaboration with other manga artists.	

- Non Non Biyori Official Anthology (Kadokawa) – Manga
- Love Lab 8.5 (Hobunsha) – 4-panel comics
- Hidamari Sketch Anthology Comic Vol. 5 (Hobunsha) – Illustrations
- Tales of Hearts Anthology Comic (ASCII Media Works) – Illustrations
- Persona 4 Dengeki Anthology Comic (ASCII Media Works) – Illustrations and manga

=== Others ===
- Main character design for Mobage's Lost Kingdom (developed by R-Force Entertainment)
- Cover design for Liverpool FC's matchday programme for Liverpool vs Ipswich on 25 January, 2025 (collaboration between Liverpool FC and Kodansha)
