= Missions of Love =

Japanese manga series

- Volume 1 of the English release

わたしに××しなさい! (Watashi ni batsu batsu shinasai!)
- Genre: Romance
- Manga
- Written by: Ema Tōyama
- Published by: Kodansha
- English publisher: NA: Kodansha USA
- Magazine: Nakayoshi
- Original run: June 10, 2009 – June 3, 2015
- Volumes: 19
- Live-action film
- Directed by: Tōru Yamamoto
- Written by: Ayako Kitagawa
- Music by: Rita-iota
- Studio: T-Joy
- Released: June 23, 2018
- Runtime: 96 minutes

Missions of Love (Japanese: わたしに××(バツバツ)しなさい!, Hepburn: Watashi ni batsu batsu shinasai!; lit. "Do ×× to me!") is a shōjo manga series by Ema Tōyama. The plot centers around a junior high student named Yukina Himuro. While she is cold and withdrawn, she finds a big secret about Shigure, a guy who is hugely popular with the girls. In order to keep the secret hidden, Yukina orders him to do "missions" with her that involve romance. Yukina feels that the missions will help her novels, but as time passes she begins to question if it is really love developing. Missions of Love appeared as a serial in the monthly manga magazine Nakayoshi from June 10, 2009, to June 3, 2015. Kodansha published the chapters in nineteen bound volumes, from October 6, 2009, to June 12, 2015. In addition to the manga, a drama CD was also released in Japan in 2012. In 2018, a live action film adaptation was released, following a mini manga sequel in Nakayoshi to help promote it.

Kodansha's American subsidiary Kodansha USA licensed the series for an English-language translation in North America. All nineteen volumes have since been released over a five-year span. Reception of the English translated series has been mixed to positive, and Missions of Love was in the New York Times Best Seller list twice for two different volumes. In Japan, the series won the Kodansha Manga Award in 2012 for best children's manga.

== Plot ==
Yukina Himuro, a third year junior high student, has a reputation as the "Absolute Zero Snow Woman" (絶対零度の雪女, Zettaireido no Yuki Onna) by her classmates based on her icy gaze and demeanor. Yukina is also the popular cell phone novelist Yupina (ユピナ), known only to Akira Shimotsuki, Yukina's cousin. Yukina writes stories but they have been falling in the ratings. In order to fix this, she chooses to write a love story but does not know where to begin. One day, Yukina overhears student council president Shigure Kitami, who is popular with the girls and good mannered, turn down one of the girls who confesses her love to him, he then writes down something in a book that Yukina sees. Afterwards, Shigure bumps into Yukina who is not impressed by him and then he goes on his way, Yukina then notices that he had dropped his book that she saw him write in. To Yukina's shock the book contains the names of girls with some of them crossed out, something Yukina picks up on that Shigure is not what he seems to be. Yukina then has an idea to blackmail Shigure into loving her in order to feel what it is like as she figures it will be good for her cell phone romance novel. Yukina approaches Shigure with the info and makes him do things to and for her which she calls "Missions" but over time Yukina begins to question if it is real love between them something Shigure continues to try to deny or just ideas she is getting by doing the missions to put in her novels. Things become even more complex when Yukina's cousin confesses his love to her as well, and wants to be "more than just a cousin" to her.

== Characters ==
Yukina Himuro (氷室 雪菜, Himuro Yukina)
Voiced by: Yōko Hikasa (drama CD)
Yukina is a third year junior high student who is known in her school by the icy cold gaze she gives off. Titled as the "Absolute Zero Snow Woman" by her classmates, Yukina also secretly publishes cell phone novels under the pseudonym Yupina (ユピナ). Yukina comes across as a cold person who is calculating and demanding, but underneath it all, she is a caring person who has not experienced true love yet, and she hopes to do it soon. Yukina always wears glasses and refuses to take them off due to a traumatic event when she was little. Because of that, she feels vulnerable without them. At some point, she was unsure of her feelings towards Shigure and Akira, so she decided to go out with both of them to finally pick the one who makes her heart race the most. Although she had stronger feelings towards Shigure than to her cousin, Yukina chose Akira. When she realized her true feelings, she broke up with Akira and later on, confessed to Shigure when he returns from his studies.
Shigure Kitami (北見 時雨, Kitami Shigure)
Voiced by: Takahiro Sakurai (drama CD)
Shigure is the student council president and hugely popular with the ladies. He comes across as a sweet guy so he can get the girls to confess their love to him and then reject them for fun. After Yukina blackmails him, Shigure does things to try to get out of her missions. Initially, he denies that he has feelings for Yukina, but after learning more about her as a person, he begins to struggle with his feelings and eventually accepts that loves her. Pressured by his family's expectations, Shigure decides to become a doctor to inherit his stepfather's hospital and dedicates his time to studying.
Akira Shimotsuki (霜月 晶, Shimotsuki Akira)
Voiced by: Yūki Kaji (drama CD)
Akira is Yukina's cousin and one of the few people who know that Yukina is Yupina. His parents died when he was young, and he has been in love with Yukina since she protected him from bullies when they were children. Because of this, he cannot bring himself to approve of her being with Shigure even if it allows her to gain material for her writing. In the middle of the series, Akira becomes Yukina's boyfriend through a trial date, but he sadly accepts that she only sees him as family. At the same time, Akira strikes up a friendship with Mami and becomes protective of her. When Mami falls in love with him, he kindly rejects her, as he is unable to move on from Yukina, and asks her not to wait for him. Near the end of the series, Akira becomes a model after being scouted.
Mami Mizuno (水野 マミ, Mizuno Mami)
Voiced by: Ayana Taketatsu (drama CD)
Mami is a frail girl and a childhood friend of Shigure. Because Shigure often doted on her and protected her from Hisame as a child, Mami is attached to him and gets jealous whenever she sees him with Yukina. She is also prone to social anxiety and calms down when Shigure pats her head. While Mami comes to terms that Shigure loves Yukina, she grow close to Akira at the same time and bonds with him over being in a similar situation with Yukina. At home, Mami lives with her father, a former host, while her mother abandoned her when she became terribly ill as a child. With Akira's help, Mami reconnects with her mother. Over time, she falls in love with Akira, and, even knowing that he loves Yukina, she still confesses to him and declares that she will wait until he moves on.
Hisame Kitami (北見 氷雨, Kitami Hisame)
Hisame is Shigure's stepbrother. He despises Shigure from constantly being compared to him and also resents him for being the heir of their family's hospital and putting a rift between Mami and himself. He has been obsessed with Mami since they were little and bullies her to see her cry. Hisame befriends Yukina and often turns to her whenever he is upset about Mami. However, after Mami repeatedly rejects him, he turns his fixation to Yukina instead, sabotaging her relationship with Shigure. At the end of the series, Hisame comes to terms that he truly loves Mami and resolves to become more mature to be worthy of her. Like Yukina, he also publishes cell phone novels under the pseudonym Dolche (ドルチェ) and is revealed to be her longtime rival.

== Media ==
=== Manga ===
Missions of Love was first serialized in the monthly Shōjo magazine Nakayoshi in June 2009, and ended in 2015 with the June 3rd issue. Parts of the series were also issued in the quarterly magazine counterpart Nakayoshi Lovely from December 17, 2009, to March 17, 2010. In all, nineteen bound volumes were published by Kodansha. Following the end of the main series, an extra edition was published in the August, 2015 issue of Nakayoshi. In addition to the manga, on February 6, 2012, a drama CD was released by Kodansha through the recording studio Rakuonsha. The script was written by Natsuko Takahashi. The CD was bundled with a limited-edition version of the eighth manga volume, and is based on events that take place in the first four volumes. In 2018, Toyama wrote a short continuation titled Missions of Love: Couple Arc (わたしに××しなさい！ カップル編, Watashi ni Shinasai! Kappuru-hen) which serialized in Nakayoshi from March to June, 2018. This was done to promote a live action film that was released during the summer.

On April 23, 2012, it was announced that American subsidiary Kodansha USA had licensed the series for release in North America. All nineteen volumes were released in a span that lasted from November 6, 2012, to December 10, 2019. Outside of North America, the series has been made available in e-book format in the United Kingdom.

=== Film ===
On June 23, 2018, a live-action film adaptation was released. To promote the film, a short 4-episode drama aired on TBS and MBS TV in March, and a sequel titled Missions of Love: Couple Arc (わたしに××しなさい！ カップル編, Watashi ni Shinasai! Kappuru-hen) was serialized in Nakayoshi from March to June, 2018. The cast stars Tina Tamashiro as Yukina, Yuta Koseki as Shigure, Anna Yamada as Mami, Kanta Sato as Akira, and Daichi Kaneko as Hisame. Both adaptations were directed by Tōru Yamamoto. The film's theme song, "Ichidaiji", is performed by Polkadot Stingray.

== Reception ==
The English-language adaptation of Missions of Love has received mixed to positive ratings: Rebecca Silverman of Anime News Network gave the first volume an overall rating of a C+ calling it a quick read, much racier than Toyama's earlier works, and telling readers who do not like an unequal romance to "steer clear". She described the art as "easy on the eyes" and sensual while calling it a "very uncomfortable romance". John Rose from The Fandom Post gave volume one an A rating calling it "Incredibly smart, sexy and possessing" and also praised the artwork. Darkstorm from Anime UK News gave the series a 6/10 saying that although the story is unoriginal and has overused things such as a school setting and love triangle, the layout of the story is great and the heart is in the right place when it comes to it. Thalia Sutton of Suvudu gave the second volume a good review, calling the series thus far appealing for commutes, and light emotional handling overall. She went on to say "Missions of Love, volume 2 closes with many possibilities for its romantic future, and leaves you feeling introspective, too" The second volume of Missions of Love spent two weeks on the New York Times Best Seller list for manga from January 13–26, 2013. The fourth volume was also on the New York Times Best Seller list for the week of July 21–27, 2013.

In Japan, the series won the 36th annual Kodansha Manga Award in 2012 for best children's manga. Circulation figures for the series topped 1.8 million total copies. Three volumes of "Missions of Love" also appeared on the Japanese Comic Ranking chart in 2013, and 2014. The first to make the chart was the 11th volume which ranked thirty-sixth on the chart for the week of February 4, 2013, with 18,224 copies sold. Next to rank was the 13th volume which ranked thirty-eight on the Japanese Comic Ranking chart for the week of June 10–16, 2013 with 17,124 copies sold. Volume fourteen was the last volume to appear on the chart, it ranked thirty-fourth on the chart for the week of February 3–9, 2014 with 14,981 sold.
