= Nakayoshi =

Japanese manga magazine

- October 1999 issue of Nakayoshi, featuring art by Natsumi Ando
- Categories: Shōjo manga
- Frequency: Monthly
- Circulation: 19,167; (July–September 2026)
- First issue: December 1954; 71 years ago
- Company: Kodansha
- Country: Japan
- Based in: Tokyo
- Language: Japanese
- Website: nakayosi.kodansha.co.jp

Nakayoshi (Japanese: なかよし; lit. 'Good Friend') is a monthly shōjo manga magazine published by Kodansha in Japan. First issued in December 1954, it is a long-running magazine with over 70 years of manga publication history. Notable titles serialized in Nakayoshi include Princess Knight, Candy Candy, Pretty Guardian Sailor Moon, Cardcaptor Sakura and Pretty Cure. Roughly the size of a phone book (hence the term "phone book manga"), the magazine generally comes with furoku, or small gifts, such as pop-out figures, games, small bags, posters, stickers, and so on. The furoku is an attempt to encourage girls to buy their own copies of the magazine rather than just share with a friend.

It is one of the best-selling shōjo manga magazines, having sold over 400 million copies since 1978. In the mid-1990s, Nakayoshi retailed for 400 yen and had an average of 448 pages. The estimated average circulation of Nakayoshi at this time was 1,800,000. Its circulation peaked at 2,100,000 in 1993. In 2007, its circulation was 400,000. In the 1990s, then editor-in-chief, Yoshio Irie attempted to move the magazine away from "first love" stories and introduced several fantasy manga such as Sailor Moon. During that period, Nakayoshi pursued a "media-mix" campaign, which involved close coordination of the magazine, anime productions based on the manga, and character merchandises. Nakayoshi is also published on the 3rd of each month.

== Serializations ==
=== Current ===
- Mermaid Melody Pichi Pichi Pitch Aqua (2021–present)
- Gifted (2021–present)
- The Witch Maid Knows the Queen's Secret (2023–present)
- Shugo Chara! Jewel Joker (2024–present)

=== Past ===
==== 1954–1979 ====
- Princess Knight (1958)
- Angel's Hill (1960–1961)
- Sarutobi Ecchan (1971)
- Candy Candy (1975–1979)
- Ohayō! Spank (1979–1982)
- Coquelicot-zaka kara (1979–1980)

==== 1980–1989 ====
- Aoi-chan Panic! (1983–1984)
- Attacker You! (1984–1985)
- Anmitsu Hime (1986–1987)
- Goldfish Warning! (1989–1993)

==== 1990–1999 ====
- Miracle Girls (1990–1994)
- Pretty Guardian Sailor Moon (1991–1997)
- Azuki-chan (1992–1997)
- Magic Knight Rayearth (1993–1996)
- Saint Tail (1995–1996)
- Cardcaptor Sakura (1996–2000)
- Delicious! (1996–1999)
- Dream Saga (1997–1999)
- Yume no Crayon Oukoku (1997–1998)
- Cyber Team in Akihabara: PataPi (1998)
- UFO Baby (1998–2002)
- Ghost Hunt (1998–2010)
- Super Doll Licca-chan (1998–1999)
- Mink (1999–2002)

==== 2000–2009 ====
- Ojamajo Doremi (2000)
- Ultra Cute (2000–2003)
- Tokyo Mew Mew (2000–2003)
- Zodiac P.I. (2001–2003)
- Mōtto! Ojamajo Doremi (2001)
- Instant Teen: Just Add Nuts (2001–2002)
- Musume Monogatari: Morning Musume Official Story (2001–2004)
- Shin Dā! Dā! Dā! (2002)
- Mermaid Melody Pichi Pichi Pitch (2002–2005)
- Mamotte! Lollipop (2002–2005)
- Koinu Dan no Monogatari (2002)
- Kamichama Karin (2003–2005)
- Ashita no Nadja (2003)
- Futari wa Pretty Cure (2004–2005)
- Futari wa Pretty Cure Max Heart (2005–2006)
- Cherry Juice (2004–2006)
- Pixie Pop (2004–2005)
- Kitchen Princess (2004–2008)
- Sugar Sugar Rune (2004–2007)
- Kedamono Damono (2004–2007)
- Hell Girl (2005–2008)
- Shugo Chara! (2005–2010)
- Futari wa Pretty Cure Splash Star (2006–2007)
- Modotte! Mamotte! Lollipop (2006–2007)
- Okko's Inn (2006–2012)
- Kamichama Karin Chu (2007–2008)
- Yes! PreCure 5 (2007–2008)
- Yes! PreCure 5 GoGo! (2008–2009)
- I Am Here! (2007–2009)
- Shugo Chara-chan! (2008–2010)
- Fresh Pretty Cure! (2009–2010)
- Arisa (2009–2012)
- New Hell Girl (2009)
- Missions of Love (2009–2012)

==== 2010–2019 ====
- HeartCatch PreCure! (2010–2011)
- Shugo Chara! Encore! (2010)
- Hell Girl R (2010–2013)
- Sabagebu! (2010–2016)
- Suite PreCure (2011–2012)
- Smile PreCure! (2012–2013)
- Kamikamikaeshi (2012–2016)
- DokiDoki! PreCure (2013–2014)
- HappinessCharge PreCure! (2014–2015)
- Fairy Tail: Blue Mistral (2014–2015)
- Stella: Nana and the Magic English Words (2014–2016)
- Go! Princess PreCure (2015–2016)
- Hōzuki no Reitetsu: Shiro no Ashiato (2015–2020)
- Witchy PreCure! (2016–2017)
- Cardcaptor Sakura: Clear Card (2016–2024)
- Kirakira Pretty Cure a la Mode (2017–2018)
- Bacteria at Work! (2017–2020)
- Hug! Pretty Cure (2018–2019)
- Vampire Dormitory (2018–2024)
- Star Twinkle PreCure (2019–2020)
- Chihiro-kun Only Has Eyes for Me (2019–2024)

==== 2020– ====
- Healin' Good Pretty Cure (2020–2021)
- Anyway, I'm Falling in Love with You (2020–2026)
- Shaman King & a Garden (2020–2022)
- Cells at Work!: Neo Bacteria (2020–2021)
- Tropical-Rouge! Pretty Cure (2021–2022)
- Delicious Party Pretty Cure (2022–2023)
- Soaring Sky! Pretty Cure (2023–2024)
- Pon no Michi (2023–2024)
- Wonderful Pretty Cure! (2024)
- You and Idol PreCure (2025)

== Circulation ==
Year / Period	Monthly circulation	Magazine sales
1978	1,600,000	19,200,000
1979	1,800,000	21,600,000
1980	1,700,000	20,400,000
1981	1,400,000	16,800,000
1982	1,200,000	14,400,000
1983	1,200,000	14,400,000
1984	1,250,000	15,000,000
1985	1,250,000	15,000,000
1986	1,250,000	15,000,000
1987	1,250,000	15,000,000
1988	1,350,000	16,200,000
1989	1,350,000	16,200,000
1990	1,200,000	14,400,000
1991	1,200,000	14,400,000
1992	1,400,000	16,800,000
January to March 1993	1,750,000	5,250,000
April 1993 to March 1994	2,100,000	25,200,000
April 1994 to December 1994	1,750,000	15,750,000
1995	1,500,000	18,000,000
1996	1,100,000	13,200,000
1997	780,000	9,360,000
1998	530,000	6,360,000
1999	500,000	6,000,000
2000	500,000	6,000,000
2001	520,000	6,240,000
2002	550,000	6,600,000
2003	490,000	5,880,000
2004	500,000	6,000,000
2005	460,000	5,520,000
2006	418,500	5,022,000
2007	400,000	4,800,000
January 2008 to September 2008	343,750	3,093,750
October 2008 to September 2009	306,667	3,680,004
October 2009 to September 2010	252,084	3,025,008
October 2010 to December 2010	250,000	750,000
January 2011 to September 2011	198,910	1,790,190
October 2011 to September 2012	170,834	2,050,008
October 2012 to September 2013	152,667	1,832,004
October 2013 to September 2014	137,500	1,650,000
October 2014 to September 2015	124,542	1,494,504
October 2015 to September 2016	104,083	2,180,004
October 2016 to September 2017	96,608	2,075,004
October 2017 to March 2018	89,125	534,750
1978 to March 2018		414,137,226

== Video games ==
Apart from games based on individual titles themselves, the following are video games based on various manga series running in Nakayoshi that have been released:

- Nakayoshi to Issho, Famicom
- Welcome Nakayoshi Park, March 3, 1994, Game Boy
- Panic in Nakayoshi World, November 18, 1994, Super Famicom
- Nakayoshi All-Stars: Mezase! Gakuen Idol!, December 18, 2008, Nintendo DS
