= List of harem anime and manga =

This is a list of anime and manga according to the role harem plays in them.

== Female harem as a central element ==
This list shows a series in which interpersonal attraction between Female-centric harems and the gynephilic protagonist(s) – regardless of cited sex, gender, orientation, etc. – play a central role in their genre or storylines. Publishers label such elements as harem.

- 1+2=Paradise
- 2.5 Dimensional Seduction
- 7-nin no Nemuri Hime
- The 8th Son? Are You Kidding Me?
- 11eyes: Tsumi to Batsu to Aganai no Shōjo
- The 100 Girlfriends Who Really, Really, Really, Really, Really Love You
- Absolute Duo
- An Adventurer's Daily Grind at Age 29
- Aesthetica of a Rogue Hero
- Ah My Buddha
- Aho-Girl
- Ai Yori Aoshi
- Akaneiro ni Somaru Saka
- Akashic Records of Bastard Magic Instructor
- Aki Sora
- Akikan!
- Amagami
- The Ambition of Oda Nobuna
- Angel/Dust Neo
- Angel Tales
- Angel's 3Piece!
- Anti-Magic Academy: The 35th Test Platoon
- Aoi House
- Apocalypse Bringer Mynoghra
- Aria the Scarlet Ammo
- Arifureta
- Armed Girl's Machiavellism
- The Asterisk War
- Asura Cryin'
- Atsumare! Fushigi Kenkyū-bu
- Baby Princess
- Backstabbed in a Backwater Dungeon
- Baka and Test
- The Banished Former Hero Lives as He Pleases
- Bastard!!
- Beast Tamer
- I Became a Legend After My 10 Year-Long Last Stand
- Ben-To
- Black Bullet
- Black Summoner
- Bladedance of Elementalers
- Bogus Skill "Fruitmaster"
- The Brilliant Healer's New Life in the Shadows
- Brynhildr in the Darkness
- C³
- The Café Terrace and Its Goddesses
- Campione!
- Cat Planet Cuties
- A Certain Magical Index
- Chained Soldier
- Change 123
- Chanto Suki tte Ieru Ko Musō
- Chaos;Child
- Chaos;Head
- Chitose Is in the Ramune Bottle
- Chrome Shelled Regios
- Chronicles of an Aristocrat Reborn in Another World
- Chuhai Lips: Canned Flavor of Married Women
- Clannad
- Classroom for Heroes
- Clear
- Combatants Will Be Dispatched!
- The Comic Artist and His Assistants
- Comic Party
- Conception
- I Couldn't Become a Hero, So I Reluctantly Decided to Get a Job
- A Couple of Cuckoos
- Creature Girls: A Hands-On Field Journal in Another World
- Cross Days
- D-Frag!
- Da Capo
- The Daily Life of a Middle-Aged Online Shopper in Another World
- Danjo-hi 1:5 no Sekai demo Futsū ni Ikirareru to Omotta?
- Date A Live
- Dealing with Mikadono Sisters Is a Breeze
- DearS
- The Death Mage
- Death March to the Parallel World Rhapsody
- Demon King Daimao
- The Demon Sword Master of Excalibur Academy
- The Devil Is a Part-Timer!
- DNA²
- Do You Like Big Girls?
- Does a Hot Elf Live Next Door to You?
- Dog Days
- I Don't Like You at All, Big Brother!!
- Dragon Crisis!
- Dragonar Academy
- Dragons Rioting
- Dual! Parallel Trouble Adventure
- Dusk Beyond the End of the World
- Dusk Maiden of Amnesia
- Easygoing Territory Defense by the Optimistic Lord
- Ebiten: Kōritsu Ebisugawa Kōkō Tenmonbu
- Eiken
- El-Hazard
- The Elusive Samurai
- The Eminence in Shadow
- Engage Kiss
- Eromanga Sensei
- Etotama
- Even Given the Worthless "Appraiser" Class, I'm Actually the Strongest
- Even the Student Council Has Its Holes!
- FairlyLife
- The Familiar of Zero
- Farming Life in Another World
- Fate/Stay Night
- Final Approach
- Fortune Arterial
- Freezing
- From Old Country Bumpkin to Master Swordsman
- The Fruit of Evolution
- The Fruit of Grisaia
- Full Clearing Another World under a Goddess with Zero Believers
- Futago Matomete "Kanojo" ni Shinai?
- Futakoi
- G-On Riders
- Gacha Girls Corps
- Gal Gohan
- Gal-sen
- Ganbare Doukichan
- Gate
- Gate Keepers
- The Genius Prince's Guide to Raising a Nation Out of Debt
- Gift
- Girlfriend, Girlfriend
- Girls Bravo
- GJ Club
- Gods' Games We Play
- Golden Boy
- Gonna be the Twin-Tail!!
- A Good Librarian Like a Good Shepherd
- Good Luck! Ninomiya-kun
- I Got a Cheat Skill in Another World and Became Unrivaled in the Real World, Too
- I Got Caught Up in a Hero Summons, but the Other World Was at Peace!
- I Got Married to the Girl I Hate Most in Class
- Gou-dere Sora Nagihara
- Gravion
- The Greatest Demon Lord Is Reborn as a Typical Nobody
- The Greatest Magicmaster's Retirement Plan
- Green Green
- Ground Control to Psychoelectric Girl
- Guardian Hearts
- H2O: Footprints in the Sand
- Haganai
- Hajirau Kimi ga Mitainda
- Hanaukyo Maid Team
- Hand Maid May
- Hands Off: Sawaranaide Kotesashi-kun
- Happiness!
- Happy Lesson
- Happy Seven
- Harem Camp!
- Harem in the Labyrinth of Another World
- Harem Marriage
- Haruka Nogizaka's Secret
- Harukoi Otome
- Hayate the Combat Butler
- He Is My Master
- Heaven's Lost Property
- Hello, Good-bye
- Hensuki
- The "Hentai" Prince and the Stony Cat
- Hero Without a Class
- The Hidden Dungeon Only I Can Enter
- High School DxD
- Highschool of the Dead
- Hima-Ten!
- Hokkaido Gals Are Super Adorable!
- Holy Corpse Rising
- Holy Knight
- Honeko Akabane's Bodyguards
- HoneyComing
- Horizon in the Middle of Nowhere
- Hoshiuta
- Hoshizora e Kakaru Hashi
- How a Realist Hero Rebuilt the Kingdom
- How Not to Summon a Demon Lord
- Hundred
- Hyakka Ryōran
- Hybrid × Heart Magias Academy Ataraxia
- The Iceblade Sorcerer Shall Rule the World
- I'm a Noble on the Brink of Ruin, So I Might as Well Try Mastering Magic
- I'm Gonna Be An Angel!
- I'm Living with an Otaku NEET Kunoichi!?
- I'm the Evil Lord of an Intergalactic Empire!
- I"s
- I've Somehow Gotten Stronger When I Improved My Farm-Related Skills
- The Ideal Sponger Life
- If Her Flag Breaks
- Iketeru Futari
- Imaizumi Brings All the Gals to His House
- Immoral Guild
- Imouto Paradise!
- In Another World with My Smartphone
- Infinite Stratos
- Interviews with Monster Girls
- Into the Deepest, Most Unknowable Dungeon
- Inukami!
- Invaders of the Rokujouma!?
- The Irregular at Magic High School
- Is It Wrong to Try to Pick Up Girls in a Dungeon?
- Is This a Zombie?
- Isuca
- Jack-of-All-Trades, Party of None
- Jimoto no Ijimekko-tachi ni Shikaeshi Shiyōto Shitara, Betsu no Tatakai ga Hajimatta
- Kage Kara Mamoru!
- Kagetora
- Kakyūsei
- Kamikaze Explorer!
- Kämpfer
- Kannagi: Crazy Shrine Maidens
- Kanojo × Kanojo × Kanojo
- Kanokon
- Kanon
- Kenichi: The Mightiest Disciple
- Kenkō Zenrakei Suieibu Umishō
- Killing Bites
- Kimi ga Aruji de Shitsuji ga Ore de
- Kimi ni Koisuru Sanshimai
- KimiKiss
- King's Proposal
- Kiss×sis
- Knights of Sidonia
- Koi Koi Seven
- Koihime Musō
- Kono Aozora ni Yakusoku o
- Labyrinth of Flames
- Ladies versus Butlers!
- Lazy Dungeon Master
- I Left My A-Rank Party to Help My Former Students Reach the Dungeon Depths!
- The Legendary Hero Is Dead!
- Let This Grieving Soul Retire!
- Liar, Liar
- Lime-iro Senkitan
- Linebarrels of Iron
- Little Busters!
- Loner Life in Another World
- Lord Marksman and Vanadis
- Lotte no Omocha!
- Love, Election and Chocolate
- Love Flops
- Love Hina
- Love Junkies
- Love Love?
- Love Tyrant
- Lovely Idol
- Maburaho
- Maga-Tsuki
- Magic Maker
- Magic Stone Gourmet
- Magical Explorer
- Magician's Academy
- Magikano
- Mahoromatic
- Maison Ikkoku
- Maji de Watashi ni Koi Shinasai!
- Maken-ki!
- Maoyu
- Maple Colors
- Marika's Love Meter Malfunction
- Marriage Royale
- Martian Successor Nadesico
- Masamune-kun's Revenge
- Mashiroiro Symphony
- The Master of Ragnarok & Blesser of Einherjar
- Mayo Chiki!
- Mayoi Neko Overrun!
- Medaka Kuroiwa Is Impervious to My Charms
- Midori Days
- A Misanthrope Teaches a Class for Demi-Humans
- The Misfit of Demon King Academy
- Miss Caretaker of Sunohara-sou
- Mistress Kanan Is Devilishly Easy
- MM!
- Monogatari
- Monster Girl Doctor
- Monster Musume
- Mother of the Goddess' Dormitory
- Mouse
- Multi-Mind Mayhem
- Mushibugyō
- Mushoku Tensei
- Muv-Luv
- My Bride Is a Mermaid
- My Crush's Crush
- My First Girlfriend Is a Gal
- My Girlfriend Is Shobitch
- My Life as Inukai-san's Dog
- My Monster Secret
- My One-Hit Kill Sister
- My Quiet Blacksmith Life in Another World
- My Sister, My Writer
- My Unique Skill Makes Me OP Even at Level 1
- My Wife Is the Student Council President
- My Wife is Wagatsuma-san
- Myriad Colors Phantom World
- Nagasarete Airantō
- Nakaimo – My Sister Is Among Them!
- Nana & Kaoru
- Negima! Magister Negi Magi
- Nekopara
- New Life+: Young Again in Another World
- New Saga
- Night Shift Nurses
- Ninja Girls
- Nisekoi
- No Game No Life
- No-Rin
- Noble Reincarnation
- Nobunaga Teacher's Young Bride
- North Wind
- Noucome
- Now I'm a Demon Lord!
- Nukitashi
- Nyan Koi!
- Nyaruko: Crawling with Love
- Oh My Goddess!
- Ohime-sama Navigation
- Omamori Himari
- One: Kagayaku Kisetsu e
- One Room
- Oneechan ga Kita
- OniAi
- Orc Eroica
- Oreimo
- Oreshura
- Oresuki
- Osamake
- Otogi-Jūshi Akazukin
- Otome wa Boku ni Koishiteru
- Outbreak Company
- Parallel Paradise
- Pastel
- Peddler in Another World: I Can Go Back to My World Whenever I Want!
- Peter Grill and the Philosopher's Time
- Photo Kano
- Photon: The Idiot Adventures
- A Playthrough of a Certain Dude's VRMMO Life
- Please Twins!
- Plus-Sized Elf
- Popotan
- Possibly the Greatest Alchemist of All Time
- A Prince of a Friend
- Princess Connect! Re:Dive
- Princess Lover!
- Princess Resurrection
- Private Tutor to the Duke's Daughter
- The Quintessential Quintuplets
- The Qwaser of Stigmata
- R-15
- Rail Romanesque
- Rail Wars!
- Ranma ½
- Re:Monster
- Reborn as a Space Mercenary
- Rebuild World
- Record of Wortenia War
- Redo of Healer
- Reincarnation Coliseum
- The Reincarnation of the Strongest Exorcist in Another World
- Remake Our Life!
- Rent-A-Girlfriend
- Rental Magica
- A Returner's Magic Should Be Special
- Rewrite
- Rich Girl Caretaker
- The Rising of the Shield Hero
- Rizelmine
- Ro-Kyu-Bu!
- Rokudo's Bad Girls
- Rosario + Vampire
- The Ryuo's Work Is Never Done!
- _Summer
- S-Rank Bōken-sha de Aru Ore no Musume-tachi wa Jūdo no Fathercon deshita
- Saber Marionette
- Saekano
- Sakura Wars
- Samurai Harem: Asu no Yoichi
- I Saved Too Many Girls and Caused the Apocalypse
- Sayonara, Zetsubou-Sensei
- School Days
- Scooped Up by an S-Rank Adventurer!
- See Me After Class
- Seirei Gensouki: Spirit Chronicles
- Seiren
- Seitokai Yakuindomo
- Sekirei
- Seton Academy: Join the Pack!
- Shimoneta
- Shina Dark
- Shining Hearts
- The Shiunji Family Children
- Shomin Sample
- Shuffle!
- Shukufuku no Campanella
- The Shy Hero and the Assassin Princesses
- Sister Princess
- A Sister's All You Need
- Sky Wizards Academy
- So, I Can't Play H!
- So You Weren't Into Me?!
- Sorcerer Hunters
- Sorcerous Stabber Orphen
- Sotsugyō Album no Kanojo-tachi
- Spy Classroom
- Steel Angel Kurumi
- Strawberry 100%
- Strike the Blood
- The Strongest Magician in the Demon Lord's Army Was a Human
- The Strongest Sage with the Weakest Crest
- Student Council's Discretion
- Studio Apartment, Good Lighting, Angel Included
- Summer Pockets
- Summoned to Another World for a Second Time
- Sundome!! Milky Way
- Super Ball Girls
- Super HxEros
- Suppose a Kid from the Last Dungeon Boonies Moved to a Starter Town
- Survival in Another World with My Mistress!
- Suzunone Seven!
- Tales of Wedding Rings
- Tayutama: Kiss on my Deity
- Tears to Tiara
- Tenchi Muyo!
- TenPuru
- Tenshin Ranman: Lucky or Unlucky!?
- The Testament of Sister New Devil
- To Heart
- To Love Ru
- Today's Cerberus
- Tokimeki Memorial Only Love
- Tona-Gura!
- Trapped in a Dating Sim
- Triage X
- Trinity Seven
- Tsugumomo
- Tsuki wa Higashi ni Hi wa Nishi ni
- Tsukihime
- Tsukimichi: Moonlit Fantasy
- Tune In to the Midnight Heart
- Tying the Knot with an Amagami Sister
- UFO Ultramaiden Valkyrie
- Ultimate Otaku Teacher
- Ulysses: Jeanne d'Arc and the Alchemist Knight
- Umine the Island Inn
- The Unaware Atelier Master
- Unbalance ×2
- Unbreakable Machine-Doll
- Undefeated Bahamut Chronicle
- Unlimited Fafnir
- UQ Holder!
- Urusei Yatsura
- Utawarerumono
- Val × Love
- Vandread
- Vermeil in Gold
- The Villager of Level 999
- Virgin Knight: I Became the Frontier Lord in a World Ruled by Women
- W Wish
- Wagamama High Spec
- Walkure Romanze
- I Was Reincarnated as the 7th Prince so I Can Take My Time Perfecting My Magical Ability
- We Never Learn
- We Without Wings
- Welcome to the El-Palacio
- When Supernatural Battles Became Commonplace
- Who Wants to Marry a Billionaire?
- Why Does Nobody Remember Me in This World?
- Wind: A Breath of Heart
- Witchcraft Works
- The Witches of Adamas
- Words Worth
- World Break: Aria of Curse for a Holy Swordsman
- The World God Only Knows
- World's End Harem
- World's End Harem: Fantasia
- The World's Finest Assassin Gets Reincarnated in Another World as an Aristocrat
- The World's Strongest Rearguard
- The Wrong Way to Use Healing Magic
- Yamada-kun and the Seven Witches
- Yandere Dark Elf: She Chased Me All the Way From Another World!
- Yankee JK Kuzuhana-chan
- Yokai Girls
- Yosuga no Sora
- You Can't Be in a Rom-Com with Your Childhood Friends!
- Yu-no
- Yumene Connect
- Yumeria
- Yuuna and the Haunted Hot Springs

== Male harem as a central element ==
This list shows series in which interpersonal attraction between Male-centric harems and the androphilic protagonist(s) – regardless of cited sex, gender, orientation, etc. – play a central role in their genre or storylines. Such elements are labeled by publishers as reverse harem.

- 100 Sleeping Princes and the Kingdom of Dreams
- Alice in the Country of Hearts
- Amnesia
- Angelique
- Anyway, I'm Falling in Love with You
- Ashita no Nadja
- B-Project
- Black Bird
- Black Rose Alice
- Bonjour Sweet Love Patisserie
- Boys Over Flowers
- Brothers Conflict
- Ceres, Celestial Legend
- Cheeky Angel
- ClassicaLoid
- Code: Realize
- Collar × Malice
- Cross-Dressing Villainess Cecilia Sylvie
- Dame×Prince
- Dance with Devils
- Dark Moon: The Blood Altar
- The Day of Revolution
- The Demon Prince of Momochi House
- Diabolik Lovers
- Full House Kiss
- Fushigi Yûgi
- Ghost Reaper Girl
- Hakuoki
- Hana-Kimi
- Hanasakeru Seishōnen
- Haou Airen
- Haruka: Beyond the Stream of Time
- Hiiro no Kakera
- Kakuriyo: Bed & Breakfast for Spirits
- Kamigami no Asobi
- Kamikamikaeshi
- Kamisama Kiss
- Kenka Bancho Otome: Girl Beats Boys
- Kiss Him, Not Me
- Kiss of the Rose Princess
- Koi suru Tenshi Angelique
- La Corda d'Oro
- La storia della Arcana Famiglia
- Love at First Memory
- Magic-kyun! Renaissance
- Makura no Danshi
- Manga Dogs
- Meiji Tokyo Renka
- The Most Heretical Last Boss Queen
- Mr Love: Queen's Choice
- My Darling! Miss Bancho
- My Next Life as a Villainess: All Routes Lead to Doom!
- Neo Angelique Abyss
- Nil Admirari no Tenbin: Teito Genwaku Kitan
- Norn9
- Otometeki Koi Kakumei Love Revo!!
- Ouran High School Host Club
- Phantom in the Twilight
- Please Excuse My Younger Brothers
- Prétear
- Prince Freya
- Red River
- Rockin' Heaven
- Romantic Killer
- Room Mate
- S.L.H Stray Love Hearts!
- Scared Rider Xechs
- Sengoku Night Blood
- Shugo Chara!
- Stand My Heroes
- Stardust Wink
- Starry Sky
- The Story of Saiunkoku
- Uta no Prince-sama
- Vampire Dormitory
- The Wallflower
- Yona of the Dawn

== LGBT harem as a central element ==
This list shows series in which interpersonal attraction between LGBT-centric harems and the androphilic protagonist(s) – regardless of cited sex, gender, orientation, etc. – play a central role in their genre or storylines. Such elements are labeled by publishers as LGBT harem.

- I Don't Know Which Is Love
- Dramatical Murder
- Gakuen Heaven
- Gokujou Drops
- Iono-sama Fanatics
- Jackpot Girls
- Kyo Kara Maoh!
- No Matter How I Look at It, It's You Guys' Fault I'm Not Popular!
- Shitsurakuen
- Tachibanakan To Lie Angle
- There's No Freaking Way I'll be Your Lover! Unless...
- The Vexations of a Shut-In Vampire Princess
