= North wind (disambiguation) =

North wind or North Wind can refer to:

- North wind, a type of wind
- North Wind (visual novel), a 2004 visual novel
- North Wind (film), a 1937 Argentinian film
- North Wind, a former passenger train service
- The Old North Wind, a character in the animated miniseries Over the Garden Wall
