= List of I Got Caught Up in a Hero Summons, but the Other World Was at Peace! characters =

Japanese light novel series characters

This article is a list of characters from I Got Caught Up in a Hero Summons, but the Other World Was at Peace!, a light novel and manga series, written by Toudai. The novels are based on a web novel, started in 2016, written by the same author, consisting of more than 2,100 chapters. The series revolves around a 21-year-old former third-year college student Kaito Miyama who was accidentally involved in a hero summoning and was brought to the Kingdom of Symphonia in the world of Trinia.

To date, the series is compiled into 14 novels and 9 manga volumes. While the novels are only published in Japan, the manga received official localization in English and French.

== Characters ==
The character information are taken from the official English-localized version of the manga series published by Seven Seas Entertainment. Please note that despite each volume features a table of contents, the pages in the manga volumes are not numbered. Also be aware that information given from the manga can be different in the original source, the web and light novels. (Note: The information given in the manga series can be different from the source material the manga is based on.) (Note: The pages in the printed manga version are not continuously numbered.) (Note: The chapters are continuing. For example: Vol. 1 contains chapters 1 to 7 and Vol. 2 the chapters 8 to 13 and a side story.)

=== Main characters ===
Kaito Miyama (宮間 快人, Miyama Kaito)
The stories' protagonist. A 21-year-old former college student who was accidentally summoned to Trinia while on his way home. During the time at high school, Kaito was a hikikomori who had bad grades at school, played video games and isolated himself from his environment.
His parents died in a traffic accident when he was 12 years old. Until his accidental summoning Kaito was raised by his aunt and uncle. In the new world, Kaito has the ability to sense emotions through magical streams in his surroundings. After being summoned to Trinia, Kaito started to write all of his experiences he made in the other world in a diary.
Because Chro helped him feel joy in his life again, Kaito began to fall in love with her. On learning that polygamy is the norm in Trinia, Kaito starts accepting the affections of the other girls in love with him.
Chromeina (クロムエイナ, Kuromueina)
A female protagonist in this story. She is one of the so-called six kings who rule over the demon realm. She has a carefree and friendly character but can show an evilish side when people she likes are treated disrespectfully.
Chromeina is a demon who has lived several hundred years and is known as Hades in the mortal realm.
She only has superficial knowledge of the human world which she amassed through conversations with former heroes. Kuromueina hates her true self as it shares similarities with Shellow Vernal. It is revealed that Kuromueina was once a part of Vernal's soul which developed its own personality and appearance. She is called Chro by her friends. Chro has short silver-colored hair and goldish eyes.
According to Shilo-Vanal, the goddess of creation, Chromeina does not have a biological gender, and can switch between male and female. Kronoa, the goddess of time, told that Chro invaded the celestial realm 20,000 years ago, took the appearance of a young girl after the conflict ended and acts as though the invasion had never taken place.
Lilia Albert (リリア・アルベルト, Riria Aruberuto)
Next to Chro, Lilia is the second female main protagonist. She is a noblewoman of Symphonia. She is gentle and friendly. Alicia is a talented sword fighter who earned herself the title of White Rose Valkyrie in the second division of the royal knights when she was 14 years old as well as several military honors. Sigelinde, an 11-year-old girl, taught Lilia how to use a sword. She blames herself for Sigelinde losing her voice after being severely injured during a monster ambush.
Lilia has problems in dealing with high-ranked non-human authorities such as the Six Kings or high-ranking gods. She is the younger half-sister of the King of Symphonia and as such, Lilia was the former Princess of Symphonia. She is the biological child of the former king and queen, while her half-brother's mother was a concubine. The nobles disputed as to who should become the next ruler of Symphone. When Lilia declined the throne, her older half-brother became the new king.
Lilia was the person responsible for the hero summoning.

=== Otherworlders ===
Seigi Mitsunaga (光永 正義, Mitsunaga Seigi)
A high schooler who was summoned to Symphonia as the hero. As part of a large festive ceremony which is held once every ten years to celebrate the victory over the demon king, Seigi received the decorative title of the hero. That title made him rather arrogant.
On his travels around the world, Princess Cattleya Lia Symphonia became irritated by his attitude and slapped him.
This incident led him to fall in love with the princess and become a more humble person. As of chapter 1.263 in the web novel he is married to Cattleya. Seigi is Hina Yuzuki's cousin who was summoned to the other world with him. He had a crush on Aoi Kusunoki in the past.
Aoi Kusunoki (楠 葵, Kusunoki Aoi)
Aoi was a high schooler who was accidentally summoned to Symphonia. In her old world she and Hina were both members of the track-and-field club at her school. Aoi is a model student and was raised in a strict household.
To relieve her stress she started playing videogames, mostly online RPGs where she met another player named "Ciel" who taught her how to play those games.
She stated "Ciel" to be her first crush. When Ciel suddenly stopped playing games due to real-life problems, she suspected that Kaito might be "Ciel" after he cited lines from the game she and "Ciel" used to play together.
Aoi has an affinity for using earth magic.
Hina Yuzuki (柚木 陽菜, Yuzuki Hina)
Hina is a high schooler who was summoned to Symphonia accidentally alongside Aoi and Kaito. In the new world she has the ability to use magic to enhance her physical abilities. For example she can run almost as fast as a bullet train. Hina received the provisional blessing from Sky the sky goddess. She is Seigi's cousin. Hina has an older brother who was Kaito's classmate in high school.

=== Six kings ===
Isis Remnant (アイシス・レムナント, Aishisu Remunanto)
Isis is one of the six kings who are ruling over the demon realm. She is known as Death king as she is surrounded by deadly magic seemingly killing everything in her reach. Therefore, she is feared and ostracized by others even when she does not want her powers to cause harm.
Her social isolation led to her feeling lonely. Isis longs to have normal conversations with other people and make friends. Her biggest hobby is reading which is why she has a considerable book collection with books gathered from all over Trinia.
Isis was envious of the other six kings as they were able to move freely and got to make friends unlike herself and which is why she distanced herself from them.
Isis has long white hair and blood-red eyes. Usually, she wears a gothic-like black dress.
Alice (アリス, Arisu)
Like Kaito, Seigi, Aoi and Hina, Alice is an otherworlder who was summoned to Trinia a long time ago. It is unclear from which world she was summoned. She is timid, hiding her face behind a mask and wearing a cat-costume.
She runs a store in the human realm where she sells high-quality goods produced by herself. Alice has long, wavy blonde hair and sapphire-like eye color. When she is wearing her cat costume she looks like a brown fluffy cat.
Lillywood Yggdrasil (リリウッド・ユグドラシル, Ririuddo Yugudorashiru)
Lillywood is a spirit and like Chro, one of the six kings with a kind nature. As the Earth king, she is worshipped in the mortal, where humans, beastmen and elves reside.
She cares for Isis a lot which is why she is visiting her as often as possible to help ease her loneliness. She sees Isis as her best friend. Lillywood has long green hair and emerald-like eye color.
Megido Argetes Borgnes (メギド・アルゲテス・ボルグネス, Megido Arugetesu Borugunesu)
Megido is one of the six kings ruling over the demon realm as War king. Depending on mood, Megiddo can take on a different human form. One of these forms looks very similar to Kuro's appearance.
Megiddo is very combative which can intensify depending on his opponent's strength. If a fight cannot be won using fists, the fight is carried out as a drinking competition.
Magnawell Baskus Lardo Kurtzvald (マグナウェル・バスクス・ラルド・カーツバルド, Magunau~eru Basukusu Rarudo Kātsubarudo)
He is the Dragon king and one of the six kings. Magnawell is more than 5,000 metres tall and considered to be the biggest creature in the universe.
His dragon scales are very valuable and are used to create high-quality adventurer equipment. He has a grandfatherly view on life.

=== Gods ===
Shalo-Vanal (シャローヴァナル, Sharō Vanaru)
She is the goddess of creation. She created Trinia in order to figure out what emotions are; after living so long she is unable to feel any emotion as she never experienced them once in her lifetime.
To her, one life is equivalent to another which is why she cannot show love towards any of her creations. Shallow is the antagonist of the main story.
Shallow has white-silverish long hair which reaches to her knees and gold-colored eyes. Her nickname is Shiro.
Kronoa (クロノア, Kronora)
Kronoa is a higher god ruling over space and time. Most of the time, she shows a serious character. Out of the three higher gods, Chronois is the most hard-working.
She has long, dark blueish hair.
Fate (フェイト, Feito)
She is the second highest ranking god and, as her name suggests, the ruler of fate. Due to her being very powerful, she looks down on other creatures who are weaker than her. She is bored by her current state.
She can foresee and manipulate the fate of every being, except for Shilo and Chro. Furthermore, she is able to create fate at will.
Fate longs for a carefree life without any obligations and strives to become a NEET. Due to her regular escapades she causes trouble for Kronoa.
Fate has a small figure and purple-colored hair tied into twintails.
Life (ライフ, Raifu)
She is the third of the higher gods and, as her name suggests, she is the goddess of life. Instead of working on her duties as a god, she is always sleepy. If the work comes from Shallow however, she is hardworking.
Life seems to have an aversion against Isis. It turns out that Raifu deeply cares for Isis's well-being which led to her testing Kaito to see if he really cares for Isis.
Shea (シア, Shia)
Shia is the goddess of disaster and subordinate of Fate.

=== Trinia ===
==== Kingdom of Symphonia ====
Lunamaria (ルナマリア, Runamaria)
She is a maid at the Albert duchy and a former member of the royal knights second division alongside Lilia and Sigelinde. She is Lilia's personal maid and a trustworthy person. Lunamaria likes to tease people she cares for.
She is a fan of Chro or King Hades as she saved her and her mother's life in the past. Lunamaria has shoulder-length light blueish hair and a redish eye color. Lunamaria has "mixed blood" as her parents are from both human and demon races.
Sigelinde (ジークリンデ, Jīkurinde)
Sigelinde is the daughter of a highly regarded magician from the elven tribe and hails from the elven city of Rigfaurecia. As a child, she was ostracized by the other inhabitants of Rigfaurecia as she was unable to either nature magic nor spirit magic. Instead, she had a magic affinity for fire elemental magic; this worsened her social isolation. She and her father moved to the royal capital of Symphonia when he was asked to work as a court magician.
Sigelinde got to know Lilia when she was still a child and taught her how to use a sword. She became Lilia's best friend.
She was a member of the royal knights second division alongside Lilia and Lunamaria. During a monster ambush, Sigelinde was severely wounded and became unable to speak.
She has short, red hair. Sieglinde dislikes her parents' meddling with her love life. She likes animals having a certain strength which is why she is attracted to Kaito's pet, a behemoth.
Raiz Ria Symphonia XVIII (ライズ・リア・シンフオニア18世, Raizu Ria Shinfuonia XVIII)
He is the current king of Symphonia and Lilia's older half-brother. Born as the son of the king and a concubine, a dispute on who should be the official heir of the throne broke out among the nobles after Lilia was born. When Lilia declined the throne, Raiz became the new ruler of the kingdom.
He is overprotective when it comes to his younger half-sister. When he did not invite Kaito to his new year celebration he incurred the anger of Chromeina, Isis and his younger sister.
Anima (アニマ)
Anima is a subordinate of Kaito. She was originally a monster called "Black Bear" who fought against Kaito and was reincarnated by Shilo-Vanal after being killed by Death king Isis Remnant. She is a beast-folk with a human appearance and bear-like characteristics (such as her ears, claws and having a tail).
While her clan was completely wiped out by Isis, only the soul of that bear who attacked Kaito was left to be reborn by Shilo-Vanal after she heard the soul's wish to become Kaito's subordinate. She received strong abilities by Shilo-Vanal which made Anima as strong as a demon viscount.

==== Alcresia ====
Chris Dia Alcresia (クリス・デイア・アルクレシア, Kurisu Dia Arukureshia)
She is the current ruler of Alcresia and holds the title of "wise emperor". She first met Kaito during a barbecue but due to Chris being disguised as a coachman, Kaito was unable to recognize her when they officially met in her palace.
She was disguised as a coachman due to Chromeina forbidding her to meet up with Kaito.
Chris has short, blue hair, and prefers wearing masculine outfits which gives a boyish look. This is the reason why Kaito mistook her for being a man.

==== Demons ====
Noin (ノイン)
A demon from the dragon kin, she normally wears black armor. She revealed that she was once summoned from Taisho-era Japan when she was a student. When she declined to be sent back to her original world she stayed in Trinia and was later reborn as a demon by Chromenia. It is also revealed that Noin was the first hero summoned to Trinia who later defeated the demon king. Her original name was Hikari Kujō.
Ahat (アハトト, Ahato)
He is a blue-skinned ogre with two horns on his forehead. Due to his appearance, he was ostracized by his clan as ogres have either red or green skin and just one horn. When he was on the verge of death, Ahat was saved by Chromeina and became a member of her family. In spite of his terrifying appearance, he is a friendly demon.
He can change his height.
Ein (アイン, Ain)
She is Chromeina's head maid and the only demon classified as duke in rank which makes her one of the strongest demons. Ein rejected the position to be at Chromeina's side even though she may be as strong as the six kings. She is a talented cook who can serve dishes after hearing the recipe once.
Ein is inconspicuous and can appear out of nowhere. She has a fierce and violent rivalry towards the goddess of time, Kronoa.
Zechs (ゼクス, Zekusu)
Zechs is an undead and the owner of Seditch Magical Item Company, a company focused on producing magical items. He creates an item-box from leftover materials for Kaito which can store almost everything except for living things.
Lazlia (ラズリア, Razuria)
She is a spirit who is a member of Chromeina's family. She is able to grow the best crops even under the most adverse circumstances. For Noin, Lazlia regularly grows rice.
Ozuma (オズマ)
Ozuma is one of the five generals of War king Megido. He is one of Megido's first subordinates and is said to be the weakest of the five generals. In fact, Ozuma is the strongest general who would be able to take on and defeat Megido if he fights seriously.
Eta (イータ, Īta)
She is a former subordinate of War king Megido. and the twin sister of Zeta. She became Kaito's personal maid and bodyguard after he spared her life in front of War king Megido.
Zeta (シータ, Shīta)
She is a former subordinate of War king Megido who became Kaito's maid and bodyguard after he spared her and her twin sister's life in front of the War king.
Ilness (イルネス, Irunesu)
She is a maid in the Albert duchy as well as a subordinate of the Illusion king. She is a member of the ten devils and her real identity is Miss Pandemonium.

== Notes ==
=== Literature ===
- Toudai (August 10, 2021) [April 26, 2019]. "Chapter 1–7". I Got Caught Up in a Hero Summons, but the Other World Was at Peace! [勇者召喚に巻き込まれたけど、異世界は平和でした (Yūsha Shōkan ni Makikomareta kedo, Isekai wa Heiwa deshita)]. Vol. 1. Translated by Latherow, Jessica. Los Angeles, California: Seven Seas Entertainment. p. 188. ISBN 978-1-64827-433-6.
- Toudai (November 16, 2021) [October 26, 2019]. "Chapter 8–13, Side Story 1". I Got Caught Up in a Hero Summons, but the Other World Was at Peace! [勇者召喚に巻き込まれたけど、異世界は平和でした (Yūsha Shōkan ni Makikomareta kedo, Isekai wa Heiwa deshita)]. Vol. 2. Translated by Latherow, Jessica. Los Angeles, California: Seven Seas Entertainment. p. 172. ISBN 978-1-64827-451-0.
- Toudai (March 1, 2022) [June 26, 2020]. "14–19, Side Story 2". I Got Caught Up in a Hero Summons, but the Other World Was at Peace! [勇者召喚に巻き込まれたけど、異世界は平和でした (Yūsha Shōkan ni Makikomareta kedo, Isekai wa Heiwa deshita)]. Vol. 3. Translated by Latherow, Jessica. Los Angeles, California: Seven Seas Entertainment. p. 180. ISBN 978-1-64827-579-1.
- Toudai (June 21, 2022) [April 26, 2021]. "Chapter 21–24". I Got Caught Up in a Hero Summons, but the Other World Was at Peace! [勇者召喚に巻き込まれたけど、異世界は平和でした (Yūsha Shōkan ni Makikomareta kedo, Isekai wa Heiwa deshita)]. Vol. 4. Translated by Latherow, Jessica. Los Angeles, California: Seven Seas Entertainment. p. 172. ISBN 978-1-63858-291-5.
- Toudai (January 24, 2023) [September 25, 2021]. "Chapter 25–29, Side Story 3". I Got Caught Up in a Hero Summons, but the Other World Was at Peace! [勇者召喚に巻き込まれたけど、異世界は平和でした (Yūsha Shōkan ni Makikomareta kedo, Isekai wa Heiwa deshita)]. Vol. 5. Translated by Latherow, Jessica. Los Angeles, California: Seven Seas Entertainment. p. 172. ISBN 978-1-63858-778-1.
- Toudai (June 20, 2023) [April 26, 2022]. "Chapter 30–34, Side Story 4". I Got Caught Up in a Hero Summons, but the Other World Was at Peace! [勇者召喚に巻き込まれたけど、異世界は平和でした (Yūsha Shōkan ni Makikomareta kedo, Isekai wa Heiwa deshita)]. Vol. 6. Translated by Latherow, Jessica. Los Angeles, California: Seven Seas Entertainment. p. 180. ISBN 978-1-68579-568-9.
- Toudai (December 26, 2023) [October 26, 2022]. "Chapter 35—40". I Got Caught Up in a Hero Summons, but the Other World Was at Peace! [勇者召喚に巻き込まれたけど、異世界は平和でした (Yūsha Shōkan ni Makikomareta kedo, Isekai wa Heiwa deshita)]. Vol. 7. Translated by Latherow, Jessica. Los Angeles, California: Seven Seas Entertainment. p. 172. ISBN 979-8-88843-091-0.
- Toudai (June 25, 2024) [July 25, 2023]. "Chapter 41–46". I Got Caught Up in a Hero Summons, but the Other World Was at Peace! [勇者召喚に巻き込まれたけど、異世界は平和でした (Yūsha Shōkan ni Makikomareta kedo, Isekai wa Heiwa deshita)]. Vol. 8. Translated by Latherow, Jessica. Los Angeles, California: Seven Seas Entertainment. p. 188. ISBN 979-8-88843-791-9.
