= Holy Corpse Rising =

Japanese manga series

- First tankōbon volume cover

聖骸の魔女 (Seigai no Majo)
- Genre: Dark fantasy; Harem; Historical fantasy
- Manga
- Written by: Hosana Tanaka
- Published by: Shōnen Gahōsha
- English publisher: NA: Seven Seas Entertainment
- Magazine: Young King OURs
- Original run: October 30, 2014 – August 30, 2018
- Volumes: 7
- icon

Holy Corpse Rising (Japanese: 聖骸の魔女, Hepburn: Seigai no Majo) is a Japanese manga series written and illustrated by Hosana Tanaka. It was serialized in Shōnen Gahōsha's seinen manga magazine Young King OURs from October 2014 to August 2018, with its chapters collected in seven tankōbon volumes. The series was licensed for English release in North America by Seven Seas Entertainment

== Synopsis ==
The story is set in an alternate fifteenth century Rome, where witches have declared war against humanity. Nikola Eskalibur (ニコラ・エスカリバ, Nikora Esukariba) is a young monk adopted by the Catholic Church, whose parents were murdered by a witch. After studying heretical tomes in the Church's secret archives, Nikola discovers the way to winning the war; he must resurrect twelve ancient witches who were locked away centuries earlier, known as the "First Witches" (最初の魔女, Saisho no Majo). To revive them, however, Nikola must form a marriage contract with each one. Nikola, thus, becomes the key to make the First Witches the Church's greatest weapons and save the world.

== Publication ==
Written and illustrated by Hosana Tanaka, Holy Corpse Rising was serialized in Shōnen Gahōsha's seinen manga magazine Young King OURs from October 30, 2014, to August 30, 2018. Shōnen Gahōsha collected its chapters in seven tankōbon volumes, released from May 30, 2015, to October 30, 2018.

The series was licensed for English release in North America by Seven Seas Entertainment. The seven volumes were published from November 29, 2016, to May 28, 2019.

=== Volumes ===
No.	Original release date	Original ISBN	English release date	English ISBN
1	May 30, 2015	978-4-7859-5557-1	November 29, 2016	978-1-626923-59-1
2	November 30, 2015	978-4-7859-5673-8	February 28, 2017	978-1-626924-28-4
3	May 30, 2016	978-4-7859-5788-9	June 20, 2017	978-1-626924-92-5
4	January 30, 2017	978-4-7859-5946-3	November 14, 2017	978-1-626925-77-9
5	August 30, 2017	978-4-7859-6069-8	August 28, 2018	978-1-626927-02-5
6	March 30, 2018	978-4-7859-6182-4	February 19, 2019	978-1-626928-59-6
7	October 30, 2018	978-4-06-382728-6	May 28, 2019	978-1-642750-24-9
