= Into the Deepest, Most Unknowable Dungeon =

Japanese manga series

- First tankōbon volume cover

ふかふかダンジョン攻略記 ～俺の異世界転生冒険譚～ (Fukafuka Danjon Kōryakuki: Ore no Isekai Tensei Bōkentan)
- Genre: Harem; Isekai
- Manga
- Written by: Kakeru
- Published by: Mag Garden
- English publisher: NA: Seven Seas Entertainment
- Imprint: Blade Comics
- Magazine: Mag Comi
- Original run: September 20, 2019 – present
- Volumes: 20

Into the Deepest, Most Unknowable Dungeon (ふかふかダンジョン攻略記 ～俺の異世界転生冒険譚～, Fukafuka Danjon Kōryakuki: Ore no Isekai Tensei Bōkentan) is a Japanese manga series written and illustrated by Kakeru. It began serialization on Mag Garden's Mag Comi manga website in September 2019.

== Plot ==
After getting hit by a truck, the protagonist is reincarnated into another world as Jean, an average boy with no special abilities. He later decides to use his experience from his previous life as a temp worker to conquer the deepest, most unknown dungeon in this new world.

== Publication ==
Written and illustrated by Kakeru, Into the Deepest, Most Unknowable Dungeon began serialization on Mag Garden's Mag Comi manga website on September 20, 2019. Its chapters have been collected into twenty tankōbon volumes as of August 2026. The series is licensed in English by Seven Seas Entertainment.

No.	Original release date	Original ISBN	North American release date	North American ISBN
1	March 10, 2020	978-4-8000-0949-4	January 4, 2022	978-1-64827-492-3
1. "The Deepest, Most Unknowable Labyrinth"; 2. "A Forged Bow Is Downward Compatible with a Crossbow"; 3. "Just Because Someone Uses Their Head and Arms While Shooting a Bow Doesn't Mean They're Second Rate!"; 4. "It Takes a Very Different Amount of Energy to Use Bullets over Bows"
2	July 10, 2020	978-4-8000-0991-3	April 5, 2022	978-1-64827-502-9
5. "If We Can't Survive, We Can't Adventure"; 6. "It's Hard to Completely Protect Yourself but at least Make Sure Your Head and Body are Protected"; 7. "To Those that Can't Win in Games or Manga in Real Life. It Turns Out They're the Strongest of All"; 8. "Old Men Background Adventurers Aren't Small Fries. They're Veterans"
3	November 10, 2020	978-4-8000-0991-3	June 28, 2022	978-1-63858-286-1
9. "In a Real Fight, Would a Dancing Girl Have the Skills to Prevail?"; 10. "You Really Can "See" Within a Space via Sound, You Know!"; 11. "In Reality, Livestock, Rivers and the Wind Can Pull a Bowstring Just as a Human Can"; 12. "Sacred Arts Are Secret Because Anyone Can Easily Mimic Them"
4	March 10, 2021	978-4-8000-1058-2	September 13, 2022	978-1-63858-362-2
13. "There Is No Era Where Using Common Sense Was the Right Thing to Do!"; 14. "Planning a Sneak Attack from Behind Is One of the Basics of Warfare"; 15. "Doesn't It Seem Like Dragons Are All Bark and No Bite Lately?"; 16. "It Seems That Animals Have a Great Sense of Individuality"
5	July 9, 2021	978-4-8000-1111-4	January 24, 2023	978-1-63858-800-9
6	November 10, 2021	978-4-8000-1145-9	June 20, 2023	978-1-63858-970-9
7	March 10, 2022	978-4-8000-1185-5	November 28, 2023	978-1-68579-625-9
8	July 8, 2022	978-4-8000-1228-9	April 23, 2024	978-1-68579-676-1
9	November 10, 2022	978-4-8000-1263-0	September 17, 2024	979-8-89160-065-2
10	March 10, 2023	978-4-8000-1306-4	February 18, 2025	979-8-89160-748-4
11	July 10, 2023	978-4-8000-1349-1	July 15, 2025	979-8-89373-012-8
12	November 9, 2023	978-4-8000-1387-3	December 16, 2025	979-8-89373-465-2
13	March 8, 2024	978-4-8000-1428-3	April 21, 2026	979-8-89373-644-1
14	July 10, 2024	978-4-8000-1472-6	August 18, 2026	979-8-89561-362-7
15	December 10, 2024	978-4-8000-1529-7	December 29, 2026	979-8-89561-659-8
16	April 10, 2025	978-4-8000-1578-5	—	—
17	August 8, 2025	978-4-8000-1625-6	—	—
18	December 10, 2025	978-4-8000-1673-7	—	—
19	April 10, 2026	978-4-8000-1729-1	—	—
20	August 7, 2026	978-4-8000-1793-2	—	—

== See also ==
- Creature Girls: A Hands-On Field Journal in Another World, another manga series by the same author
