= Today's Cerberus =

Japanese Manga series by Ato Sakurai

- Cover of the first volume (English release)

今日のケルベロス (Kyō no Kerberos)
- Genre: Comedy, harem
- Manga
- Written by: Ato Sakurai
- Published by: Gangan Comics
- English publisher: NA: Yen Press
- Magazine: Monthly Shōnen Gangan
- Original run: January 22, 2014 – May 11, 2018
- Volumes: 12

Today's Cerberus (Japanese: 今日のケルベロス, Hepburn: Kyō no Kerberos) is a Japanese manga series by Ato Sakurai. It has been serialized in Square Enix's monthly manga magazine Monthly Shōnen Gangan from January 22, 2014, to May 11, 2018. Yen Press acquired the license for an English release in April 2015.

== Plot ==
Chiaki Mikado was bitten as a child by a mythical creature known as Cerberus which caused him to lose a piece of his soul. Eight years later he finds little joy in life, and is surprised one day when the Cerberus returns offering to help. Chiaki soon discovers that the creature is made up of three very different personalities that share the same body. Kuro really wants to make him happy, Shirogane shows a tsundere side, and Roze is quiet and possibly in love with him. As the story progresses Chiaki learns more about the three who want to help him.

== Characters ==
=== Humans ===
Chiaki Mikado (御門千明, Mikado Chiaki)
Fifteen year old Chiaki is the main character of the story, a high school student he finds himself lacking any fun in life, and is considered strange by his classmates. Eight years ago he rescued a three headed dog being tormented by some kids, only for to lose a fragment of his soul when the frightened creature's middle head bit him. Chiaki ends up encountering the Cerberus when shipped to him from overseas by his father, ending up in a series of misadventures with the three-headed dog as she entered human form and later split into three separate girls. In the final chapter, Chiaki falls in love with Kuro after his soul was completely restored.
Hinata Komone (小茂根陽, Komone Hinata)
Hinata is a local shrine maiden, and is a classmate of Chiaki. She develops a massive crush on him, but is too shy to say how she really feels. She eventually finds out about the Cerberus and Chiaki's soul-less problem, and vows to help him in hopes of getting closer romantically. She is skilled at archery and exorcism.
Idora Hashiba (波柴威虎, Hashiba Idora)
Another one of Chiaki's classmates, Idora is rumored to have legendary toughness. In reality he is a misunderstood withdrawn guy who has studied martial arts for a number of years. He becomes friends with Chiaki as the two have in common being misunderstood, and withdrawn. He had a pet cat named Hako-Maro when he was little who he thought was a male cat, that after dying came back in spirit form to announce that she was in fact a female.
Minerva Micah Ashberry (ミネルヴァ = ミカ = アッシュベリー, Mineruva Mika Asshuberī)
Minnie (ミニィ) for short, this character first appears in the third volume of the series. As children, Chiaki unknowingly promised her that they would get married as adults. He later forgets the promise which makes Minnie upset, but she continues to try and get close to him as she deeply loves him. She sees the Cerberus as her romantic rivals.
Haruomi Haruna
Idora's acquaintance since junior high school. Haruomi once made Hako upset because he thought that Hako was an alien. After being slapped by Shirogane, Haruomi becomes able to see supernatural beings.
Chihiro Mikado
Chiaki's older sister.

=== Cerberus ===
The series heroines, first meeting Chiaki as a child, the three personalities of Cerberus initially existed in one body which changes to reflect the acting persona with through cycle: Kuro -> Shirogane -> Roze -> Kuro, and use a set of headphones to communicate with each other. But Kuro accidentally caused Shirogane and Roze to separate from her body, allowing the three to co-exist as sisters and rivals. In human form, they resemble human girls with dog tails.

Kuro (クロ, Kuro; lit. 'Black')
Kuro is the second head of Cerberus that Chiaki meets when he opens up the box she was in, essentially the younger sister of the other two. She is shown to love bread crust, and makes it her job to protect Chiaki and make him happy. Initially, unaware of her other selves' existence, Kuro gets subverted by Shirogane and ends up confused once Roze restores her as the active persona. But Kuro caused Shirogane and Roze to split from her, considering the two her older sisters. In the final chapter, Kuro became completely human after she drinks all of the spirit energy in the vessel that was originally needed to restore Chiaki's soul.
Shirogane (シロガネ, Shirogane; lit. 'Silver')
Shirogane is the third head of Cerberus, a tsundere-type who is a fighter and badmouths Chiaki despite having a soft spot for him. While she and the other heads shared a body, Shirogane takes over whenever Kuro gets stressed and needs someone to grab her tail for Roze to manifest.
Roze (ロゼ, Rose; lit. 'Rose')
Roze is the middle head of Cerberus whom Chiaki first met as a child while she ended up in the human world, accidentally inflicting a curse on him when she bit him out of fear. She since wore a mask to keep her powers in check while the personalities of Shirogane and Kuro developed, later taking a romantic interest in Chiaki whom she vowed to protect. While she and the other heads shared a body, Roze appears whenever Shirogane gets someone to grab their tail with Roze able to give Kuro back control of their body. After she and Shirogane got separated from Kuro, Roze eventually removed her mask as she saw no more reason to wear it.

=== Spirit/Monsters ===
Hako-Maro (ハコ麻呂, Hakomaro)
Hako-Maro or Hako was Idora's pet cat when he was little. Hako was given a male's name as Idora's parents thought she was a male cat, so he in turn thought that as well. Half a year after she died she returned to Idora as a Nekomata in the form of a little girl, but was upset at him for referring to her as a male when she was alive. Since Idora was an only child though the two were quite close. She is initially nervous when he becomes friends with Chiaki as she fears he will not need her companionship anymore but is reassured by Kuro that it would never happen. Hako shows much love and caring for Idora, vowing to always remain with him forever. Hako hates when the word "Maro" is added to her name, and being a cat refers to Kuro as a "dumb dog".
Tamamo-no-Mae (玉藻前)
Tama first appears in the fourth manga volume after Hinata accidentally releases her from her shrine. She then possesses Hinata so she can grant her wish of getting closer to Chiaki as a way of thanking her. Hinata is later able to overpower the possession which confuses Tama who insists on getting them together. Hinata explains to her that possession isn't the right way to truly confess to someone so she follows Hinata around afterwards, becomes her friend, and helps in any way to get them closer together. Tama is usually shown in chibi form but can transform into a busty adult when explaining what feminine appeal looks like.
Fenrir aka Rir Rir
RirRir appears in the second manga volume, and kidnaps Chiaki in order to make him into a meal. Her strength is shown to be with her eyes in the form of hypnosis to anyone who looks into them. She uses this power to have her victims defend her, and fight when needed. Her real identity is the great Norse wolf Fenrir, in the series she has two sisters who unlike her accept Japanese society. She is later bound up by her younger sisters and forced to repent for her actions against Chiaki and his friends. Rir Rir has remained there ever since with a "bad wolf" label on her bound body.
Jormungand and Hel
These two mythical figures are shown to be the younger sisters of Rir Rir in the series. After binding up their older sister they both make an apology to Chiaki, and Kuro. Jormungand works as a maid, and likes Japanese culture, while Hel (shown to be a little girl) carries her guard dog Garm on her back in the form of a backpack. Hel is queen of their "Northern Hell". While Jormungand appears to be helpful but her true motives remain unclear.

== Release ==
Today's Cerberus was first serialized in the monthly manga magazine Monthly Shōnen Gangan starting on January 22, 2014, through a special edition version of the magazine. When the fourth volume was released, a Drama CD was bundled in with the printed volume. Yen Press initially announced in April, 2015 through a panel at Sakura-Con that it would release Today's Cerberus in a digital format, but later changed this to include printed manga format as well.

No.	Original release date	Original ISBN	English release date	English ISBN
1	January 22, 2014	9784757542013	July 21, 2015	9780316308014
2	June 21, 2014	9784757543294	July 21, 2015	9780316308045
3	December 22, 2014	9784757545014	August 18, 2015	9780316391702
4	April 22, 2015	9784757546110	August 18, 2015	9780316391726
5	September 19, 2015	9784757547360	October 27, 2015	9780316356862
6	February 20, 2016	9784757548824	November 14, 2017	9780316416078
7	July 22, 2016	9784757550575	March 6, 2018	9780316416115
8	December 22, 2016	9784757551831	April 24, 2018	9781975300241
9	June 22, 2017	9784757553729	June 26, 2018	9781975300272
10	November 22, 2017	9784757555198	August 21, 2018	9781975381127
11	June 21, 2018	9784757557468	January 22, 2019	9781975383756
12	June, 2018	9784757557475	April 30, 2019	9781975330392

== Reception ==
The English language adaptation of Kyō no Kerberos has received reviews from various notable sources. Richard Gutierrez from The Fandom Post said that he thought the three girls inhabiting the same body concept was initially promising, but was disappointed on how it ended there with the usual stereotypical themes/traits. Gutierrez cites manga series such as Ranma ½, and Dragon Ball for similarities, but goes on to say that the experience could be new to someone not familiar with the hinted references.
