= Creature Girls: A Hands-On Field Journal in Another World =

Japanese manga series

- First tankōbon volume cover

科学的に存在しうるクリーチャー娘の観察日誌 (Kagakuteki ni Sonzai Shiuru Kurīchā Musume no Kansatsu Nisshi)
- Genre: Harem; Isekai
- Manga
- Written by: Kakeru
- Published by: Akita Shoten
- English publisher: NA: Seven Seas Entertainment
- Imprint: Champion Red Comics
- Magazine: Champion Cross (2017–2018); Manga Cross (2018–present)
- Original run: February 7, 2017 – present
- Volumes: 18

Creature Girls: A Hands-On Field Journal in Another World (科学的に存在しうるクリーチャー娘の観察日誌, Kagakuteki ni Sonzai Shiuru Kurīchā Musume no Kansatsu Nisshi) is a Japanese manga series written and illustrated by Kakeru. It began serialization on Akita Shoten's Champion Cross website in February 2017. It was later transferred to the Manga Cross website in 2018.

== Plot ==
Daisuke has always been fascinated with the appearances of monster girls. One day, he wakes up in another world and finds that there are monster girls all around him, and after analyzing them, he resolves to be a harem king.

== Publication ==
Written and illustrated by Kakeru, Creature Girls: A Hands-On Field Journal in Another World began serialization on Akita Shoten's Champion Cross website on February 7, 2017. On July 10, 2018, the series was transferred to Akita Shoten's newly formed Manga Cross website after the merger of both Champion Cross and Champion Tap! services. Its chapters have been collected into eighteen tankōbon volumes as of June 2026.

The series is licensed in English by Seven Seas Entertainment who publish it under their Ghost Ship imprint.

=== Volumes ===
No.	Original release date	Original ISBN	North American release date	North American ISBN
1	November 20, 2017	978-4-253-23816-8	June 4, 2019	978-1-947804-62-3
2	April 20, 2018	978-4-253-23817-5	October 29, 2019	978-1-642757-21-7
3	November 20, 2018	978-4-253-23818-2	March 31, 2020	978-1-947804-65-4
4	April 19, 2019	978-4-253-23819-9	September 29, 2020	978-1-947804-83-8
5	September 20, 2019	978-4-253-23820-5	December 22, 2020	978-1-947804-84-5
6	April 20, 2020	978-4-253-23821-2	November 29, 2022	978-1-63858-626-5
7	October 20, 2020	978-4-253-23822-9	March 16, 2023	978-1-63858-757-6
8	May 20, 2021	978-4-253-23823-6	August 22, 2023	978-1-63858-922-8
9	December 20, 2021	978-4-253-23824-3	January 23, 2024	978-1-68579-508-5
10	May 19, 2022	978-4-253-23825-0	July 2, 2024	979-8-88843-656-1
11	October 20, 2022	978-4-253-32121-1	December 10, 2024	979-8-88843-984-5
12	April 20, 2023	978-4-253-32122-8	April 22, 2025	979-8-89160-933-4
13	November 20, 2023	978-4-253-32123-5	September 16, 2025	979-8-89373-608-3
14	May 20, 2024	978-4-253-32124-2	February 17, 2026	979-8-89373-609-0
15	December 19, 2024	978-4-253-32125-9	July 14, 2026	979-8-89561-275-0
16	June 19, 2025	978-4-253-32126-6	December 15, 2026	979-8-89765-260-0
17	December 19, 2025	978-4-253-00936-2	—	—
18	June 19, 2026	978-4-253-01753-4	—	—

== Reception ==
By May 2024, the series had over 1.4 million copies in circulation.

== See also ==
- Into the Deepest, Most Unknowable Dungeon, another manga series by the same author
