= Hima-Ten! =

Japanese manga series

- First tankōbon volume cover, featuring Himari Yoshino

ひまてん！ (Himaten!)
- Genre: Romantic comedy
- Manga
- Written by: Genki Ono
- Published by: Shueisha
- English publisher: NA: Viz Media
- Imprint: Jump Comics
- Magazine: Weekly Shōnen Jump
- Original run: July 8, 2024 – June 29, 2026
- Volumes: 11
- icon

Hima-Ten! (Japanese: ひまてん!, Hepburn: Himaten!) is a Japanese manga series written and illustrated by Genki Ono. The series was serialized in Shueisha's Weekly Shōnen Jump magazine from July 2024 to June 2026, with its chapters collected into eleven tankōbon volumes.

== Plot ==
The series follows Tenichi Iemori, a 16-year-old high school student who works part-time as a house cleaner. On his first day as a second-year student, Himari Yoshino, a popular model who owns a popular makeup line, transfers to his school. He then discovers that he was hired to clean Himari's apartment on a regular basis, as contrary to Himari's public persona, she is unable to keep her place clean.

== Characters ==
Tenichi Iemori (家守 殿一, Iemori Ten'ichi)
Voiced by: Shūichirō Umeda (vomic)
A 16-year-old second year high school student who works part-time as a house cleaner. He decided to take a job in order to provide for his family. He does most of the household chores as his father lives elsewhere due to work. Along with Honoka, he serves as one of the class representatives. He has had a crush on Honoka since middle school.
Himari Yoshino (美野 妃眞理, Yoshino Himari)
Voiced by: Miku Itō (vomic)
A high school student who transfers to Tenichi's school at the start of their second year. She is a popular model and influencer who owns her own makeup line named Hima Riz. She lives alone and in contrast to her public persona, her apartment is a mess as she is too busy to clean up on her own. She wears glasses while at home.
Honoka Kanai (叶 穂乃花, Kanai Honoka)
Voiced by: Hiori Nashimoto (vomic)
Tenichi's classmate and the other class representative. She and Tenichi are on good terms. She has a crush on him. She works part-time at a cafe. Due to her similarity to the popular idol Nonoka Himeno, she was asked to perform as an idol during the school festival.
Mayu Konoe (近衛 真弓, Konoe Mayu)
Tenichi's classmate and friend. She has an energetic personality.
Kanna Aizawa (愛澤 カンナ, Aizawa Kanna)
A model who belongs to the same agency as Himari. She initially lives outside of Tokyo but visits for work; later, she moves to Tokyo and transfers to the same high school as Tenichi, Himari, Honoka, and Mayu, where she enrolls as a first-year student.
Nonoka Himeno (姫野乃々華, Himeno Nonoka)
A former idol in the group Fairy True who resigns her position in the group, takes an apartment next to the Iemori family, and starts a new job as the assistant homeroom teacher for Class 2-A. She serves as a wingman to Tenichi and gives him advice regarding his relationship with the girls who have feelings for him, particularly Honoka.

== Publication ==
Hima-Ten! is written and illustrated by Genki Ono, who previously made the manga series Full Drive in 2017. It was serialized in Shueisha's Weekly Shōnen Jump magazine from July 8, 2024, to June 29, 2026. The series is also published in English on Manga Plus and Viz Media's website. The series was compiled into eleven tankōbon volumes, released from November 1, 2024, to September 4, 2026. To promote the series, three voice comics covering the first three chapters, featuring Shūichirō Umeda as Tenichi and Miku Itō as Himari, respectively, were posted on the official Shōnen Jump YouTube channel.

No.	Original release date	Original ISBN	English release date	English ISBN
1	November 1, 2024	978-4-08-884322-3	July 7, 2026	978-1-9747-5563-9
1. "The Schoolgirl Prez and the House Cleaner" (女子高生社長と家政夫, Joshi Kōsei Shachō to Kaseifu); 2. "The House-Cleaning Starts" (家事代行開始, Kaji Daikō Kaishi); 3. "Secret Relationship" (秘密の関係, Himitsu no Kankei); 4. "Shopping" (買い出し, Kaidashi); 5. "A Totes Competent Worker" (しごでき, Shigodeki); 6. "Cooking Lesson" (調理実習, Chōri Jisshū); 7. "The Demure Heroine" (ひかえめなヒロイン, Hikaeme na Hiroin)
Tenichi Iemori is the eldest of three, just starting his second year of high school; after his father was transferred, he assumed household cooking and cleaning duties, then started a part-time job cleaning houses, saving his earnings for college. He is the class representative, joined by his crush Honoka Kanai, the class sub rep, and on the first day of school is assigned to welcome Himari Yoshino, a new transfer student who is a popular influencer with her own line of makeup. That afternoon, he begins work at a new client's luxurious yet filthy apartment; it turns out to be Himari's, and she swears him to secrecy over its condition to protect her brand. Himari soon expands his role to provide daily homemade bento. While dressing incognito to shop for cleaning supplies together, Himari and Tenichi run into Honoka at her part-time job as a coffee barista; after they leave, Honoka is envious that Himari and Tenichi apparently are growing closer. Tenichi gives Himari a cooking lesson so she can sustain the domestic goddess illusion created by Tenichi's lunches during an in-class cooking unit. An energetic Mayumi Konoe inadvertently hints at Honoka's feelings for Tenichi before cancelling her plans with Honoka, leaving a spare ticket, and Himari encourages Honoka to use it and ask Tenichi to a stand-up comedy show.
2	January 4, 2025	978-4-08-884438-1	September 1, 2026	978-1-9747-6443-3
8. "A Fun Day Off" (楽しい休日, Tanoshii Kyūjitsu); 9. "Bare Hearts" (裸の心, Hadaka no Kokoro); 10. "Payday" (給料日, Kyūryōbi); 11. "Himari's Protege" (ひまりの後輩, Himari no Kōhai); 12. "Heart-Racing Kanna" (ドキドキカンナ, Doki Doki Kanna); 13. "Study Group" (勉強会, Benkyōkai); 14. "Shining Heroine" (輝いたヒロイン, Kagayaita Hiroin); 15. "Heroines Assemble!" (ヒロイン集結！, Hiroin Shūketsu!); 16. "Kanna, the Transfer Student" (転校カンナ, Tenkō Kanna)
Mayu's white lie gives Honoka and Tenichi two extra hours together in Shinjuku before the show; after their satisfying date, Tenichi prepares congee for Himari, who is bedridden with a cold. She asks him to wash her clothes, but he declines as he is too bashful to see her underwear. A few days later, Himari frets over the best way to give Tenichi his first pay and the delay causes him to fear he will be fired. On the Yamanote Line, Tenichi helps Kanna Aizawa find a lost bag; she is an aspiring model and first-year high schooler on her way to her debut event. After the event, Kanna, who works with Himari, walks in on Tenichi while he is cleaning Himari's apartment. Kanna sees Tenichi acting like a husband to Himari and perceives the growing mutual attraction between them. Honoka offers to tutor Tenichi; Himari wonders if he is fond of Honoka, which he confirms by asking her for advice in declaring his affection for Honoka. She shares a photograph of herself from the first year of middle school, showing how far she has come to earn self-confidence. Kanna shows up unexpectedly at school and announces she will enroll there starting tomorrow. Tenichi volunteers to help Kanna with chores and unpacking from her recent move to Tokyo.
3	April 4, 2025	978-4-08-884451-0	November 10, 2026	978-1-9747-6447-1
17. "Kanna's Unpacking" (かんなの荷解き, Kanna no Nihodoki); 18. "Prepping for the School Camping Trip" (林間学校の準備, Rinkan Gakkō no Junbi); 19. "The School Camping Trip Starts!" (林間学校スタート!, Rinkan Gakkō Sutāto!); 20. "Up the Mountain" (登山, Tozan); 21. "Night at the School Camping Trip" (林間学校の夜, Rinkan Gakkō no Uoru); 22. "Stargazing" (天体観測, Tentai Kansoku); 23. "Haunted Walk" (肝だめし, Kan Dame Shi); 24. "Like Normal" (いつも通り, Itsumodōri); 25. "Homesick Kanna" (ホームシックカンナ, Hōmushikku Kanna)
Kanna and Tenichi unpack at her apartment; one open box reveals Kanna is a fan of shōjo manga featuring kindly butlers. Kanna, Himari, and Tenichi shop for clothes in Harajuku, where Himari suggests an outfit for Tenichi. On the bus to a school camping trip, Honoka and Tenichi are seated together; after losing a bingo game, they sing "Sakuranbo" in exchange for a later excursion to the observation deck. Himari hands out free samples of her 'lucky love' lipstick, to be worn in front of their crush. Tenichi is assigned to trail the group on a group hike so he can assist any stragglers; Himari pretends to suffer a leg cramp to accompany him. At the camp, while rejecting potential suitors, Himari sighs and Tenichi confesses he admires her hard work and hopes her Hima-Riz makeup line makes normal girls feel seen too. Tenichi realizes Honoka is wearing the 'lucky love' lipstick when they meet at the observation deck, but she claims it was just to prevent chapped lips. For the final outdoors event, Tenichi and Himari are paired for a haunted walk; realizing that he never told Honoka she was cute, Himari volunteers to let him practice with her. They stumble and accidentally kiss on the cheek. Himari realizes she is starting to care for Tenichi; they discuss expanding his scope of work, literally allowing him into more private spaces. Kanna, homesick, visits a shrine with Himari and Tenichi; Tenichi cluelessly gives each an omamori amulet.
4	June 4, 2025	978-4-08-884557-9	January 5, 2027	978-1-9747-1649-4
26. "Home-Maid Kanna" (ホームメイドカンナ, Hōmu Meido Kanna); 27. "Home Mate Kanna" (ホームメイトカンナ, Hōmu Meito Kanna); 28. "Home Mate Kanna Part 2" (ホームメイトカンナ2, Hōmu Meito Kanna 2); 29. "Parent-Teacher Conferences" (三者面談, Sansha Mendan); 30. "Hono-Ten!" (ほのてん!, Hono-Ten!); 31. "Broody Himari" (モヤモヤひまり, Moyamoya Himari); 32. "Day Off and End-of-Term Ceremony" (お休み終業式, O Yasumi Shūgyō-Shiki); 33. "Beachfront Leading Ladies" (波打ち際のヒロイン, Namiuchigiwa no Hiroin); 34. "Beachfront Leading Ladies, Part 2" (波打ち際のヒロイン2, Namiuchigiwa no Hiroin 2)
Tenichi helps Kanna capture a cockroach at her apartment; as thanks, she dresses as a maid and cooks omurice for him. After Kanna is cast in a film, Honoka suggests Tenichi's mom could style her hair. Kanna accompanies Tenichi and his younger brother and sister to an amusement park, and her obvious affection for Tenichi leads to a Ferris wheel ride together, where she confesses her love to Tenichi but claims it was practice for her upcoming role. At the mid-term parent-teacher conferences, Tenichi meets Honoka's youthful, flirty mom, who asks for help while she recovers from a sprained wrist, and Himari's cool, aloof mom, who approves his care for Himari. Before he arrives, Honoka spends the day cleaning; with little left to do, Tenichi gardens and cooks dinner. She invites him to her summer cram school. Himari is surprised to learn that Tenichi is also working for Honoka; Himari invites herself to the grocery with him and they share an umbrella in the rain. He misses the end-of-term ceremony with a slight fever, causing all three girls to worry and they visit; Tenichi's dad asks later if he has a favorite. Himari invites her friends to a beachfront vacation house in Kamakura; there, Tenichi is flustered by Honoka and Kanna in swimsuits, and when he rescues Himari from a stray wave, she realizes she is growing jealous. In the bath, Mayu confesses a crush on Tenichi, shocking the other three; they sit with him while watching a scary movie. Himari asks if she can stop rooting for Honoka.
5	September 4, 2025	978-4-08-884656-9	—	—
35. "Kanna House Call" (カンナ訪問, Kanna Hōmon); 36. "Summer Class!" (夏期講習!, Kaki Kōshū!); 37. "Fireworks Show" (花火大会, Hanabi Taikai); 38. "Airborne Fireworks" (打ち上げ花火, Uchiage Hanabi); 39. "A New Member of the Family" (新しい家族, Atarashī Kazoku); 40. "New Term" (新学期, Shin Gakki); 41. "Sumire Invasion" (すみれ乱入, Sumire Ran'nyū); 42. "Shy Honoka" (ひかえめなほのか, Hikae-mena Honoka); 43. "The School Festival of a Famous High School Girl" (カリスマJKの学園祭, Karisuma JK no Gakuen)
Kanna delivers vegetables to Tenichi, who is planning meals with his sister Mikoto; privately, Mikoto tells Kanna she and her mom hope Kanna will date him. After Kanna wins the grand prize for the gravure magazine Yan Jam, she hugs him impulsively and redeems his promise to cook her a meal, which he says they will share with Himari, dampening her joy. Tenichi takes a week off from work for cram school with Honoka, who is overwhelmed when he calls her cute. Mayu interrupts to invite them to view fireworks at a summer festival; Himari is unable to keep her plans to view fireworks with him. Tenichi attends the festival with Honoka, Yokomizo, and Mayu, where he wins a digital projector, which he uses to show Himari a video of the fireworks. When he returns to her apartment that night for the private screening, she puts on makeup and a yukata. She tells him she needs to be more direct and secretly realizes she has a crush on Tenichi. Himari adopts a stray kitten named Maro from the Terasaka family. On the first day of the new term, Himari recognizes their classmate, sprinter Sumire Terasaka, as a childhood friend, but her cold reaction confuses Himari. Sumire suspects Tenichi is stalking Himari; she actually was overwhelmed to meet Himari, as she founded a Himarin fan club. Sumire realizes that Himari has a crush on Tenichi, and Himari asks her for love advice. Honoka clears up a misunderstanding with Tenichi over shared takoyaki and her friends persuade her to act as the primary idol in a three-girl group at the upcoming school festival. Himari's wish to perform at the festival turns into a secret date when she volunteers to help Tenichi with event coordination while keeping a low profile.
6	November 4, 2025	978-4-08-884744-3	—	—
44. "School Festival Kanna" (学園祭カンナ, Gakuen-sai Kanna); 45. "Fashion Show Kanna" (ファッションショーカンナ, Fasshon Shō Kanna); 46. "An Ordinary School Festival" (普通の学園祭, Futsū no Gakuen-sai); 47. "Idol Concert!" (アイドルライブ, Aidoru Raibu); 48. "After-Party" (打ち上げ, Uchiage); 49. "Sumire's Stanning" (すみれのオタ活, Sumire no Ota Katsu); 50. "Himenono's Prologue" (ひめののプロローグ, Himeno no Purorōgu); 51. "Himari's Strategy" (ひまりの駆け引き, Himari no Kakehiki); 52. "Thanks for All Your Hard Work" (勤労感謝, Kinrō Kansha)
Kanna is the hit of the cosplay cafe in a fitted cheongsam and convinces Tenichi to participate in the fashion show as a couple; when they appear together, Honoka, Himari, and Mayu are shocked. Himari embarks on a stamp rally with Tenichi and when she confesses to enjoy the ordinary high school girl experience, he says every day is special because he gets to hang out with a celebrity. Honoka asks Mayu if Tenichi likes Kanna before Honoka, Iori Yamada, and Hazuki Yano cover Fairy True's "Inner Pocket Romance" as The Flower Girls. Tenichi praises her performance and Honoka says she declined a chance to be an idol because she has a crush; Tenichi cannot imagine who. At the after party, Tenichi watches Himari perform "Unrequited Love", and she walks home alone, vowing to make him notice her. Sumire runs into Tenichi while shopping and falls asleep on his shoulder while returning home. Tenichi visits Honoka at her work but is too shy to ask who her crush is; on the way out, he literally runs into Himenono (Nonoka Himeno), the center singer of the idol group Fairy True, who declares she is quitting the group and ends up giving Tenichi a somewhat harrowing ride home. Himari's new strategy of being aloof to Tenichi leads to a frank conversation and she asks him on a date for the upcoming Labor Thanksgiving Day, ostensibly to express her appreciation for his help. Himari treats him to both the attraction (aquarium) and restaurant, and Tenichi confesses he wishes he could find a way to show how grateful he is for her, too, so she surprises him with a long hug, saying it will give her energy.
7	January 5, 2026	978-4-08-884816-7	—	—
53. "Neighbor" (お隣さん, Otonari-san); 54. "The Teacher, Miss Himenono!" (ひめのの先生!!, Himenono Sensei!!); 55. "Honoka and Himenono" (ほのかとひめのの, Honoka to Himenono); 56. "Mall Tour Kanna" (モールツアーカンナ, Mōru Tsuā Kanna); 57. "Himenono Tour Kanna" (ヒメノノツアーカンナ, Himenono Tsuā Kanna); 58. "Hug Hug Himari" (はぐはぐひまり, Hagu Hagu Himari); 59. "Heartwarming Memories" (おもひでぽのぽの, Omohide Pono Pono); 60. "A Heartwarming Future" (みらひぽのぽの, Mirahi Pono Pono); 61. "Himeno's Holiday" (ひめの休日, Himeno Kyūjitsu)
Back at school, both Tenichi and Himari are unsettled by their warm embrace. At home, he learns that Himeno has moved in next door while joining their high school as the new assistant homeroom teacher for Class 2-A; she knows about Tenichi's conflicted feelings for Kanna, Honoka, and Himari, and they in turn each struggle with jealousy over the new competitor for Tenichi's attention. Honoka asks Himeno for advice; she susses out Honoka's attraction to Tenichi immediately and reassures the student. Mayu engineers a situation to give Honoka and Tenichi a tender moment alone together. Tenichi gets Kanna's help to shop at LoLoport mall for a birthday present for the twins; she insists on seeing Tenichi home, where she realizes Himeno is his neighbor. Kanna's jealousy explodes as she mistrusts the former idol; Mrs. Iemori greets the pair and tells them to head to Tenichi's room, where Kanna invites him to read Himenono's bikini photo book. She takes off her blouse, inviting him to compare her swimsuit-clad body to Himeno's, but Tenichi gives her confidence, saying he has always been her fan for life. Himari struggles with insecurity over the new neighbor and fears the hug has alienated Tenichi, but when she confronts him, he is amenable to future hugs, relieving her self-doubts. On Himeno's advice, Honoka invites Tenichi to visit their former middle school, as their old homeroom teacher is getting married; she assumes they have started dating, based on how their past. Honoka nearly confesses her feelings but does not and Tenichi goes to work; he returns home to find Himeno waiting to tell him Honoka is waiting for him inside her apartment. Tenichi proposes they abandon their cautious stances. Because she got soaked in the rain, Honoka takes a bath and, in lounge clothes, tells him it is like they are living together, causing them both to nearly combust with embarrassment as they imagine a future as a couple. Tenichi, torn between the three amazing girls, seeks advice from Himeno. Together with her former manager Matsumaru, she learns to swim.
8	March 4, 2026	978-4-08-884871-6	—	—
62. "What to Do on Xmas" (どうするXday, Dō Suru Xday); 63. "Christmas Presents!" (クリスマスプレゼント!!, Kurisumasu Purezento!!); 64. "Honoka's Workplace" (ほのかのバ先, Honoka no Ba-saki); 65. "Friends on the Eve" (イブの友情, Ibu no Yūjō); 66. "Christmas with the House Cleaner" (家政夫とのクリスマス, Kasei Otto to no Kurisumasu); 67. "Opportunity-Maker Kanna" (チャンスメイクカンナ, Chansu Meiku Kanna); 68. "Celebration Kanna" (お祝いカンナ, Oiwai Kanna); 69. "Kan-Ten!" (カンてん!, Kan-Ten!); 70. "New Year's Eve" (大晦日, Ōmisoka)
Christmas schedules are out of sync: Honoka is working, Tenichi is cleaning Himari's apartment, and Kanna is busy with remedial classes. Himari schedules a holiday party and confesses her crush to Sumire, who takes Tenichi shopping for a present to give Himari; he buys thoughtful presents for each of the three girls (and Sumire). Honoka invites him to walk to a light display, where he gives her flower-shaped earrings and she gives him a "personal tutoring session" coupon with unlimited uses. He realizes he needs to tell Honoka he is working for Himari. Tenichi and Himari share a meal where he gives her a neck massager and asks if he can tell Honoka he is working for Himari. Although she forgets his gift (a monogrammed apron), she vows to join the "competition" for his heart. On Dec 26, Tenichi gives Kanna her a few tickets to the cinema; she uses the gift to ask him out and shows her magazine cover. They attend a film adaptation of Kanna's favorite butler manga romance but she is too distracted by Tenichi. Afterward, Kanna tells Tenichi that Himari is too busy to dine as a trio; while Tenichi's "special flower hot pot" is stewing at her apartment, they look through her magazine and Kanna confesses she likes him, giving him a kiss on the cheek as his gift. The next day, Tenichi runs into Himeno and she deduces that Kanna has confessed to him. Mayu and Honoka arrive with an omamori shrine amulet for Himeno and invite Tenichi to snowboard with friends.
9	May 1, 2026	978-4-08-885038-2	—	—
71. "Post Kan-Ten" (カンてんアフター, Kan-Ten Afutā); 72. "Heroine on the Slopes, Part 1" (ゲレンデのヒロイン前編, Gerende no Hiroin Zenpen); 73. "Heroine on the Slopes, Part 2" (ゲレンデのヒロイン後編, Gerende no Hiroin Kōhen); 74. "New Year, New Start" (新年の門出, Shin'nen no Kadode); 75. "Radiant Heroine" (輝けるヒロイン, Kagayakeru Hiroin); 76. "Over at a Friend's House" (友達の家で, Tomodachi no ie de); 77. "Hima—Let's Visit a Shrine" (ひまりもうで, Himari Mōde); 78. "Third School Term" (3学期, 3 Gakki); 79. "Viral Feelings" (バズる想い, Bazuru Omoi)
Tenichi confesses he is flattered but has a crush on Honoka; Kanna is undaunted, saying he can't reject her because she never asked him out. In a flashback, Tenichi reminisces about the ski trip he missed out on in middle school; Honoka visited afterward to admire his sense of responsibility. This time Honoka falls ill and no one wants to go, so they visit Honoka instead. Honoka recovers enough to go on a brief walk outside with Tenichi; he later believes she was the heroine. Himari returns from vacation and surprises Tenichi by dismissing his services, realizing she can't date an employee. Tenichi delays his dismissal by a month, saying he will not confess to Honoka until then. After he leaves, Sumire arrives and Himari explains why she loves him. When he visits the next day "as a friend", he experiences a series of unfamiliar situations and flirtations. After lunch, Himari invites Tenichi to visit Asakusa Shrine with her for New Year's. He prays for good luck when he asks Honoka out and receives a bad omen; she declines to reveal her prayer. On the first day of school, he greets Kanna and Honoka; Himenono tasks the class reps with planning the upcoming class trip. That night, Himari's manager Tsubone says that a viral photograph of Himari with Tenichi was posted to social media. Himari panics but Tsubone patiently listens to her explanation. Tenichi and Himari are mortified but Tsubone advise them to say they are just friends; privately, she says he could be both Himari's cleaner and boyfriend.
10	July 3, 2026	978-4-08-885094-8	—	—
80. "Viral Feelings, Part 2" (バズる想い2, Bazuru Omoi 2); 81. "Whole-Effort Honoka" (本気ほのか, Honki Honoka); 82. "Ready Kanna" (レディカンナ, Redi Kanna); 83. "Love Home Kanna" (ラブホームカンナ, Rabu Hōmu Kanna); 84. "Overwhelming Heroine" (圧倒的ヒロイン, Attōteki Hiroin); 85. "Himari LINE" (まりライン, Mari RAIN); 86. "House Cleaner Line" (家事代行ライン, Kaji Daikō Rain); 87. "Half a Month Left" (残り半月, Nokori Hangetsu); 88. "Date with Honoka" (ほのかとデート, Honoka to Dēto)
Mayu shows Honoka the viral photo, prompting Tenichi to reveal that he is her house cleaner; later, she tells Mayu she will confess her love in one month. Himeno counsels Honoka to confess immediately, but she decides to build his feelings over the month. Honoka invites him for private tutoring at her house after he places in a less advanced class at her cram school. Kanna tells Himari that she may have rushed Tenichi into approaching Honoka because Kanna confessed her love; Kanna takes advantage of a moment alone while he helps her move again; however, he says he intends to confess to Honoka and learns that Kanna fell for him because he encouraged her nascent career. Tenichi apologizes for rejecting her because of the potential damage to her image; Himari later texts Tenichi to reassure him that Kanna is fine. Himari asks Tenichi to take Maro to the veterinarian as a favor. With two weeks left to go, Tenichi realizes that he loves Himari, but he couldn't see that while he was working for her. However, he thinks of Himari as a friend, while Honoka makes his heart race. Before their study session, they go on a date while taking and sharing photographs; their favorite pictures turn out to be candid portraits of each other. Honoka's kindness and optimism sparked his attraction. When it is time to study together, she bashfully confesses her parents are out celebrating their anniversary and invites him to her home, where they will be alone.
11	September 4, 2026	978-4-08-885180-8	—	—
89. "Honoka and the Study Session" (ほのかとの勉強会, Honoka to no Benkyō-kai); 90. "What It Meant Until Now" (これまでの意味, Kore Made no Imi); 91. "Himari's Day" (ひまりの一日, Himari no Tsuitachi); 92. "The Final Cleaning" (最後の家事代行, Saigo no Kaji Daikō); 93. "Himari and Tenichi" (ひまりとてんいち, Himari to Tenichi); 94. "Honoka and Tenichi" (ほのかとてんいち, Honoka to Tenichi); 95. "Just My Girl" (自分だけのヒロイン, Jibun Dake no Hiroin); 96. "Beautiful Home" (ビューティフルホーム, Byūtifuru Hōmu)
Earlier, Himari and Honoka confessed their shared love for Tenichi to each other; Honoka decided not to interfere between Himari and Tenichi until the end of the month. When Honoka and Tenichi part after the study session, she gives him a letter to be opened the day before the class trip. At a park, Himari, Tenichi, and Tsubone meet, describing a photo book Himari will publish to showcase a day in her life, including a photo shoot with house cleaner Tenichi; the book will make their relationship public, and prove it is strictly professional. When Tenichi sees her day, he realizes how "cool and cute" she is. He leaves after a last dinner; Tsubone says Himari is trying to clear the way for Honoka and convinces her to chase after him. When Himari opens the door, Tenichi is still there, still torn between the two girls. He says Himari has filled his mind lately because he cares about her and needs to know her feelings. Himari tells him that taking care of others is his love language and that is wonderful enough to be worthy of being her first crush, encouraging him to make Honoka as happy as he has made her. After parting, they each break down in tears. Honoka's letter contains excerpts from her middle school diary, proving that she has liked Tenichi for years. At their scheduled meeting, he confesses he did not expect the letter but confirms his mutual feelings, apologizing for making her wait, and proposes they move in together so he can make her happy every day; she interrupts him with a kiss. Mayu and Yokomizo burst from hiding, congratulating the pair; later, Himenono and Sumire do the same. When Tenichi returns Himari's key, she congratulates Tenichi and he thanks her for recognizing his talents. Five years later, Honoka and Tenichi have moved in together after graduating from college. Himenono has secured the lead as Princess Kaguya on a streaming service, Kanna's career continues to blossom, and Himari welcomes new employee Sumire, calling Tenichi her best friend.

== Reception ==
The series has been nominated for the 11th Next Manga Awards in the print category in 2025.
