= I Got Caught Up in a Hero Summons, but the Other World Was at Peace! =

Japanese light novel series

- Cover of the first light novel volume

勇者召喚に巻き込まれたけど、異世界は平和でした (Yūsha Shōkan ni Makikomareta kedo, Isekai wa Heiwa deshita)
- Genre: Isekai; Romance; Harem
- Novel series
- Written by: Toudai
- Published by: Shōsetsuka ni Narō
- Original run: May 7, 2016 – present
- Light novel
- Written by: Toudai
- Illustrated by: Ochau
- Published by: Shinkigensha
- Imprint: Morning Star Books
- Original run: June 22, 2017 – present
- Volumes: 15
- Manga
- Written by: Toudai
- Illustrated by: Jirō Heian
- Published by: Kadokawa Shoten
- English publisher: NA: Seven Seas Entertainment
- Imprint: Kadokawa Comics A
- Magazine: Comp Ace
- Original run: August 25, 2018 – present
- Volumes: 10

I Got Caught Up in a Hero Summons, but the Other World Was at Peace! (勇者召喚に巻き込まれたけど、異世界は平和でした, Yūsha Shōkan ni Makikomareta kedo, Isekai wa Heiwa deshita) is a Japanese light novel series written by Toudai and illustrated by Ochau.

The series started as a web novel on May 7, 2016, when Toudai published the first chapter on the user-generated novel publishing website Shōsetsuka ni Narō and was later acquired by Japanese publisher Shinkigensha for a physical release. The first printed volume of the novel was published in Japan on June 22, 2017.

In 2018, the novels got a manga adaptation with illustrations handled by Jirō Heian. The first volume was published by Kadokawa Shoten on April 26, 2019. The manga series was licensed by Seven Seas Entertainment for an English release in 2021.

== Plot ==
Somewhere in Japan, the 21-year-old third-year college student Kaito Miyama gets involved in a hero summoning while on his way home alongside the high schooler students Aoi Kusunoki, Hina Yuzuki and Seigi Mitsunaga. Together, they were transported to the Kingdom of Symphonia. Lilia Albert, the noblewoman in charge of the Hero Summoning, explains that Kaito, Aoi, and Hina were "caught up" in the Hero Summons, which, in this world, are decennial celebrations of the Demon Lord's defeat by the "First Hero," with the current summoning being the 100th, marking 1000 years since the First Hero had been summoned.

== The World of Trinia ==
=== General background ===
The world of Trinia consists out of three realms: The celestial realm above, the demon realm below and the mortal realm sandwiched in-between the celestial and the demon realm. All realms are divided by invisible barriers but it is possible for each and everyone to visit other realms through the usage of portals. The celestial realm is where holy creatures and the gods reside. The mortal realm is inhabited by humans, elves and dwarves. The largest realm is the demon realm.

The demon realm is divided into five regions: The northern region with grasslands and deep forests, the southern region with vast mountains, the western region which consists of deserts and volcanoes, the eastern region with grasslands and rivers and a central region. The northern region is where Death king Isis resides, the southern region is home of the Dragon king Magnawell, the western region is ruled by War king Megido and the eastern region is home of Chromeina.

While celestial beings rarely visit the other realms, demon kins are more often to witness in the mortal realm. The currency of Trinia is called Rilas, with one Rila being equal to approx. 100 Yen.

Since the first summoned hero defeated the demon king all races live together in peace. This is the reason why once every ten years a festive celebration is held. At the beginning the inhabitants of the mortal realm didn't about the existence of the celestial and the demon realms while demons and gods knew about the existence of the mortal realm. The demons were prohibited to visit the mortal realm by contract written by the Six kings which was broken with the invasion of the mortal realm by the demon king. Even though, the Six kings were stronger than the demon king, they regarded latter as the potential threat. With the invasion of the demon king in the mortal realm it became necessary to summon a hero from another world who is to fight the demon king. After the demon king was defeated, an armistice was settled and a non-aggression pact had been signed between mortals and demons, it was the first hero who, with the support of the Six kings, was able establish world peace.

In Trinia, magic exists which is classified as elemental magic, such as earth, fire, wind, water, electric, light and dark magic as well as non-elemental magic used for strengthen physical abilities for example. Magic can be stored in magical items which only can be used by persons with magical affinity.

=== Rank system ===
Despite not having a general ranking system, powerful demons are classified in titles similar to nobles. Those powerful entities are able to hide their true power by using cloaking magic. In the celestial realm a ranking system exists as well which consists out of four classes with the goddess of creation being the highest. The lower classes are the supreme gods, the higher gods and the lesser gods.

== Media ==
=== Light novel ===
Toudai started publishing the first chapter on May 7, 2016, on the user-generated online publishing website Shōsetsuka ni Narō and published more than 2,000 chapters on the platform. This work is considered as Toudai's debut. In 2017, Toudai won the grand prize at the Morning Star Award for his work, which led to the novel being acquired by Shinkigensha for a print release, featuring illustrations by Ochau.

In an interview given by Toudai after winning the award, he stated that he had initially planned on writing a fantasy story where the protagonist is ostracized for being useless until he finds a hidden power. Due to him feeling unsure if he would be able to write a captivating story, Toudai scrapped the idea and wrote a story where the protagonist was summoned into a peaceful world where he was welcomed by everyone.

The first printed novel was published in Japan on June 22, 2017, with 15 novels being released as of February 20, 2026.

No.	Japanese release date	Japanese ISBN
1	June 22, 2017	978-4-7753-1503-3
2	October 23, 2017	978-4-7753-1549-1
3	March 22, 2018	978-4-7753-1580-4
4	August 5, 2018	978-4-7753-1611-5
5	November 17, 2018	978-4-7753-1634-4
6	March 28, 2019	978-4-7753-1708-2
7	July 31, 2019	978-4-7753-1737-2
8	November 22, 2019	978-4-7753-1784-6
9	May 20, 2020	978-4-7753-1817-1
10	December 14, 2020	978-4-7753-1871-3
11	May 19, 2021	978-4-7753-1907-9
12	October 4, 2021	978-4-7753-1958-1
13	July 4, 2022	978-4-7753-1998-7
14	December 19, 2023	978-4-7753-2085-3
15	February 20, 2026	978-4-7753-2178-2

=== Manga ===
A manga adaptation illustrated by Jirō Heian began serialization in the October 2018 issue of Comp Ace magazine, which was published on August 25, 2018. The first printed volume in tankōbon format was published in Japan on April 26, 2019, by Kadokawa Shoten. As of September 24, 2025, ten volumes were published in Japan.

In February 2021, Seven Seas Entertainment announced that they have licensed the manga series for an English-language localization. The first localized volume was published on August 10, 2021. On December 10, 2024, publisher Meian Editions announced that they have licensed the manga series for a French-language publication, with the first volume set to be released on January 24, 2025.

No.	Original release date	Original ISBN	English release date	English ISBN
1	April 26, 2019	978-4-04-108144-0	August 10, 2021	978-1-64827-433-6
2	October 26, 2019	978-4-04-108774-9	November 16, 2021	978-1-64827-451-0
3	June 26, 2020	978-4-04-109625-3	March 1, 2022	978-1-64827-579-1
4	April 26, 2021	978-4-04-111354-7	June 21, 2022	978-1-63858-291-5
5	September 25, 2021	978-4-04-111803-0	January 24, 2023	978-1-63858-778-1
6	April 26, 2022	978-4-04-112474-1	June 20, 2023	978-1-68579-568-9
7	October 26, 2022	978-4-04-112941-8	December 26, 2023	979-8-88843-091-0
8	July 25, 2023	978-4-04-112942-5	June 25, 2024	979-8-88843-791-9
9	September 25, 2024	978-4-04-113807-6	June 24, 2025	979-8-89160-636-4
10	September 24, 2025	978-4-04-116222-4	July 7, 2026	979-8-89561-681-9

== Reception ==
=== Sales and Chart performances ===
According to Light Novel News, I Got Caught Caught Up in a Hero Summons, but the Other World Was at Peace! sold about 300.000 copies of the novels in Japan by January 2021. By December 2023 the novels sold about 1.4 million copies in Japan.

Several light novel volumes of this series managed to rank in the top 10 of the Oricon Light Novels Sales Charts. (Note: Due to the lack of web archivations the Light Novel Sales Charts are inaccessible until the End of 2018.) The ninth volume sold about 3.800 copies in the first week after its initial publication ranking on 7th place. In its first week after release, the twelfth volume of I Got Caught Up in a Hero Summons, but the Other World Was at Peace! sold 3.809 copies and ranked fifth on the Light Novel Sales Charts. The thirteenth installment sold approx. 4.500 copies upon its publication charting on 7th place. (Note: Oricon only publishes the first 10 positions of the Light Novel Sales Charts. To view positions below the 10th rank a paid subscription is necessary.)

Several manga volumes charted in the top 30 of the Oricon Manga Sales Charts. (Note: Due to incomplete web archivations of the Manga Sales Charts researching possible Chart notations is nearly impossible for the time period prior Mid 2021.) The manga's sixth volume sold 18.500 copies upon its release, ranking 23rd in the Manga Sales Chart. The seventh installment sold about 17.200 copies and peaked on 33rd place. (Note: Oricon only publicly publishes the first 30 positions of the Manga Sales Charts; for accessing further positions a paid account is necessary.) The 8th volume of the manga series ranked at 28th selling about 16.500 copies in its first week after publication. With approx. 17.400 copies sold, the ninth manga volume peaked at rank 20.

=== Critics ===
In 2017, the work won grand prize at Shinkigensha's Morning Star Award. The work was listed on 21st place on the ranking 30 Isekai That Are Better Than You'd Expect by Comic Book Resources. The reviewer wrote in his justification that the manga exchanges action scenes with a slice-of-life scenario which became more common in recent years. The manga was described as a relaxing read that gradually builds up its world and characters while keeping conflicts to a bare minimum. Sage Ashford ranked the work on tenth place in his 11 Best Isekai Manga That Still Need Anime Adaptations on Comic Book Resources.

In a review for Japanese website Dengeki Online, Neon Onrai wrote positively about the first volume of the manga. The reason for the positive review were the characters of the story such as the main protagonist who was accidentally summoned to another world without any cheat skill. Instead, the protagonist is able to put himself into another's shoes thanks to his characteristics. Due to this ability, he is able to feel the pain and sorrow of the people around him.

In 2024, the manga series was listed in the Manga You Should Read list by MyAnimeList alongside 19 other titles in the category For Beginners.

== Notes ==
=== Literature ===
- Toudai (August 10, 2021) [April 26, 2019]. "Chapter 1–7". I Got Caught Up in a Hero Summons, but the Other World Was at Peace! [勇者召喚に巻き込まれたけど、異世界は平和でした (Yūsha Shōkan ni Makikomareta kedo, Isekai wa Heiwa deshita)]. Vol. 1. Translated by Latherow, Jessica. Los Angeles, California: Seven Seas Entertainment. p. 188. ISBN 978-1-64827-433-6.
- Toudai (November 16, 2021) [October 26, 2019]. "Chapter 8–13, Side Story 1". I Got Caught Up in a Hero Summons, but the Other World Was at Peace! [勇者召喚に巻き込まれたけど、異世界は平和でした (Yūsha Shōkan ni Makikomareta kedo, Isekai wa Heiwa deshita)]. Vol. 2. Translated by Latherow, Jessica. Los Angeles, California: Seven Seas Entertainment. p. 172. ISBN 978-1-64827-451-0.
- Toudai (March 1, 2022) [June 26, 2020]. "14–19, Side Story 2". I Got Caught Up in a Hero Summons, but the Other World Was at Peace! [勇者召喚に巻き込まれたけど、異世界は平和でした (Yūsha Shōkan ni Makikomareta kedo, Isekai wa Heiwa deshita)]. Vol. 3. Translated by Latherow, Jessica. Los Angeles, California: Seven Seas Entertainment. p. 180. ISBN 978-1-64827-579-1.
- Toudai (June 21, 2022) [April 26, 2021]. "Chapter 21–24". I Got Caught Up in a Hero Summons, but the Other World Was at Peace! [勇者召喚に巻き込まれたけど、異世界は平和でした (Yūsha Shōkan ni Makikomareta kedo, Isekai wa Heiwa deshita)]. Vol. 4. Translated by Latherow, Jessica. Los Angeles, California: Seven Seas Entertainment. p. 172. ISBN 978-1-63858-291-5.
- Toudai (January 24, 2023) [September 25, 2021]. "Chapter 25–29, Side Story 3". I Got Caught Up in a Hero Summons, but the Other World Was at Peace! [勇者召喚に巻き込まれたけど、異世界は平和でした (Yūsha Shōkan ni Makikomareta kedo, Isekai wa Heiwa deshita)]. Vol. 5. Translated by Latherow, Jessica. Los Angeles, California: Seven Seas Entertainment. p. 172. ISBN 978-1-63858-778-1.
- Toudai (June 20, 2023) [April 26, 2022]. "Chapter 30–34, Side Story 4". I Got Caught Up in a Hero Summons, but the Other World Was at Peace! [勇者召喚に巻き込まれたけど、異世界は平和でした (Yūsha Shōkan ni Makikomareta kedo, Isekai wa Heiwa deshita)]. Vol. 6. Translated by Latherow, Jessica. Los Angeles, California: Seven Seas Entertainment. p. 180. ISBN 978-1-68579-568-9.
- Toudai (December 26, 2023) [October 26, 2022]. "Chapter 35—40". I Got Caught Up in a Hero Summons, but the Other World Was at Peace! [勇者召喚に巻き込まれたけど、異世界は平和でした (Yūsha Shōkan ni Makikomareta kedo, Isekai wa Heiwa deshita)]. Vol. 7. Translated by Latherow, Jessica. Los Angeles, California: Seven Seas Entertainment. p. 172. ISBN 979-8-88843-091-0.
- Toudai (June 25, 2024) [July 25, 2023]. "Chapter 41–46". I Got Caught Up in a Hero Summons, but the Other World Was at Peace! [勇者召喚に巻き込まれたけど、異世界は平和でした (Yūsha Shōkan ni Makikomareta kedo, Isekai wa Heiwa deshita)]. Vol. 8. Translated by Latherow, Jessica. Los Angeles, California: Seven Seas Entertainment. p. 188. ISBN 979-8-88843-791-9.
