= Danjo-hi 1:5 no Sekai demo Futsū ni Ikirareru to Omotta? =

Japanese light novel series

- Danjo-hi 1:5 no Sekai demo Futsū ni Ikirareru to Omotta?: Gekiomoi Kanjō na Kanojo-tachi ga Mujikaku Danshi ni Honrō Saretara
- First light novel volume cover

男女比1：5の世界でも普通に生きられると思った？ ～激重感情な彼女たちが無自覚男子に翻弄されたら～
- Genre: Romantic comedy
- Novel series

Teisō Kannen Gyakuten Sekai Dakedo Futsū ni Ikirareru to Omoikonderu Yatsu: Danjo-hi 1:5 no Sekai Demo Futsū ni Ikirareru to Omotta?
- Written by: Kōtarō Mifuji
- Published by: Shōsetsuka ni Narō; Kakuyomu
- Original run: May 15, 2022 – present
- Light novel
- Written by: Kōtarō Mifuji
- Illustrated by: Jimmy
- Published by: ASCII Media Works
- Imprint: Dengeki Bunko
- Original run: February 9, 2024 – present
- Volumes: 6
- Manga
- Written by: Kōtarō Mifuji
- Illustrated by: Yui Momoki
- Published by: Kadokawa Shoten
- Imprint: Kadokawa Comics A
- Magazine: Monthly Shōnen Ace
- Original run: October 25, 2024 – present
- Volumes: 4

Danjo-hi 1:5 no Sekai demo Futsū ni Ikirareru to Omotta?: Gekiomoi Kanjō na Kanojo-tachi ga Mujikaku Danshi ni Honrō Saretara (男女比1：5の世界でも普通に生きられると思った？ ～激重感情な彼女たちが無自覚男子に翻弄されたら～) is a Japanese light novel series written by Kōtarō Mifuji and illustrated by Jimmy. It was originally serialized as a web novel on the online publication platforms Shōsetsuka ni Narō and Kakuyomu beginning in May 2022, before ASCII Media Works began publishing it as a light novel under its Dengeki Bunko imprint in February 2024; six volumes have been published as of August 2026. A manga adaptation illustrated by Yui Momoki began serialization in Kadokawa Shoten's Monthly Shōnen Ace magazine in October 2024, with four volumes released as of June 2026.

== Plot ==
Masato Katasato, a recent high school graduate, finds himself transported to an alternate world with a 1:5 male-to-female ratio. Because of this, women became interested in the limited men in this world. Masato finds himself being the object of attraction of multiple women, all while trying to live normally despite the circumstances of his new world.

== Characters ==
Masato Katasato (片里 将人, Katasato Masato)
A recent high school graduate who had been preparing to enter university before he was transported to another world. He is currently a university student in the new world. Despite his efforts to live a normal life, multiple women become attracted to him.
Aika Tsukuda (附田 藍香, Tsukuda Aika)
The owner of a boy's bar called Festa, where Masato works part-time. Although she is married, she is currently not living with her husband. She has been taking care of Masato since he came into this world, and he considers her his guardian.
Koumi Igarashi (五十嵐 恋海, Igarashi Koumi)
Voiced by: Hikaru Tono (PV)
A first-year college student, who belongs to the same department and faculty as Masato. She first befriended Masato when he was working on his university acceptance. She becomes his first friend at university and quickly develops feelings for him.
Yuka Maeda (前田 由佳, Maeda Yuka)
Voiced by: Hikaru Tono (PV)
A middle-school student and a member of the basketball club. She initially befriended Masato shortly after he arrived in this world, and she treats him like an older brother despite her feelings towards him.
Mizuho Tonosaki (戸ノ崎 みずほ, Tonosaki Mizuho)
Voiced by: Hikaru Tono (PV)
Koumi's best friend, who teases her regarding her apparent feelings but becomes conflicted when she begins having feelings for Masato. She and Mizuho were previously members of the tennis club.
Seira Mochizuki (望月 星良, Mochizuki Seira)
Voiced by: Hikaru Tono (PV)
An office worker who became a regular at Festa. She often picks Masato to serve her whenever she comes, becoming possessive of him as time goes on.
Shiori Shinomiya (篠宮 汐里, Shinomiya Shiori)
Voiced by: Hikaru Tono (PV)
A second-year high school student and the daughter of Aika's acquaintance. Masato starts tutoring her as she is aiming to enter his university. She develops feelings for Masato as he reminds her of the heroes of the romance novels she reads and begins changing her appearance to look less plain.

== Media ==
=== Light novel ===
The series is written by Kōtarō Mifuji, who originally began posting it as a web novel on the online publication platform Shōsetsuka ni Narō on May 15, 2022, under the pen name Tarotaro; the series was originally posted under the title Teisō Kannen Gyakuten Sekai Dakedo Futsū ni Ikirareru to Omoikonderu Yatsu: Danjo-hi 1:5 no Sekai Demo Futsū ni Ikirareru to Omotta? (貞操観念逆転世界だけど普通に生きられると思い込んでる奴（男女比1：5の世界でも普通に生きられると思った？）). The series also began serialization on Kadokawa's Kakuyomu service three days later.

The series was later picked up for publication by Kadokawa's subsidiary ASCII Media Works, which began publishing it as a light novel under their Dengeki Bunko imprint, featuring illustrations by Jimmy. The first volume was released on February 9, 2024; six volumes have been released as of August 7, 2026.

No.	Release date	ISBN
1	February 9, 2024	978-4-04-915437-5
2	June 7, 2024	978-4-04-915649-2
3	December 10, 2024	978-4-04-915910-3
4	May 10, 2025	978-4-04-916305-6
5	January 9, 2026	978-4-04-916719-1
6	August 7, 2026	978-4-04-952182-5

=== Manga ===
A manga adaptation illustrated by Yui Momoki began serialization in Kadokawa Shoten's Monthly Shōnen Ace magazine on October 25, 2024. The first tankōbon volume was released on April 25, 2025; four volumes have been released as of June 26, 2026. Two promotional videos featuring Hikaru Tono were released to promote the first volume.

No.	Release date	ISBN
1	April 25, 2025	978-4-04-116055-8
2	August 26, 2025	978-4-04-116635-2
3	February 25, 2026	978-4-04-117161-5
4	June 26, 2026	978-4-04-117478-4

== Reception ==
The manga adaptation ranked 9th in a list of the most popular manga serialized on the Niconico service for the first half of 2025.
