= Kimi ni Koisuru Sanshimai =

Japanese manga series

- First tankōbon volume cover

キミに恋する三姉妹
- Genre: Romantic comedy; Slice of life
- Manga
- Written by: Saku
- Published by: Akita Shoten
- Imprint: Shōnen Champion Comics
- Magazine: Manga Cross/Champion Cross
- Original run: August 15, 2023 – present
- Volumes: 9

Kimi ni Koisuru Sanshimai (Japanese: キミに恋する三姉妹; lit. "Three Sisters in Love with You") is a Japanese manga series written and illustrated by Saku. It began serialization in Akita Shoten's Manga Cross (now Champion Cross) web service in August 2023, and has been compiled into nine volumes as of August 2026.

== Plot ==
Itsuki Chishou, a junior high school student, becomes lonely following his father's death. As he mourns, he meets an older girl named Amane Aikawa, who treats him well. The two promise to meet again in the future, but they immediately lose contact. Itsuki aims to study hard, hoping to be reunited with Amane. The two reunite during his second year of high school, when he has chance encounters with Amane's younger sisters Shion and Mone. He then comes home to find out that the three sisters, including Amane, would now be living together with him as their parents are moving abroad.

== Characters ==
Itsuki Chishou (知将 樹, Chishō Itsuki)
A 17-year-old student in his second year of high school. His father died when he was in junior high school, inspiring him to study hard with the aim of getting into a good university. He briefly met Amane shortly after his father's death and fell in love with her, but lost contact with her. Due to his intelligence and diligence, Shion asks him to tutor her.
Amane Aikawa (愛川 天音, Aikawa Amane)
A 20-year old university student and Itsuki's first love. She was a high school student when they first met, and they promised to go on a date when they reunited. She and her two younger sisters are members of a popular influencer and dancinggroup.
Shion Aikawa (愛川 詩音, Aikawa Shion)
A second-year high school student and Amane's younger sister. She first met Itsuki at a bookstore when she found a book Itsuki was looking for. Due to her poor grades, she asks Itsuki to tutor her.
Mone Aikawa (愛川 萌音, Aikawa Mone)
A junior high school student and Amane's younger sister. She is protective of Shion. At the start of the series, she was secretly skipping school due to being conscious about feeling inferior to her older sisters.

== Development ==
Saku was inspired to create a manga with multiple heroines, with online influencers being a theme for the series. Being a fan of online videos, she wondered what happened behind the scenes with content creators and wanted to explore that idea in greater detail. She aimed to create a series that involved perverted or ecchi situations, but where such incidents happened naturally, even feeling like they were rewards for Itsuki's relationship with the sisters rather than being forced by the plot. She also wanted to incorporate such ecchi situations into the influencer plot, such as showing how influencer activity could result in incidents involving Itsuki. She wrote Itsuki to be a relatable character, using his dedication to studying as a point that readers could connect with.

== Publication ==
The series is written and illustrated by Saku, who originally began serializing it in Akita Shoten's Manga Cross web service on August 15, 2023; it continued serialization following the service's rebranding to Champion Cross in 2024. The first tankōbon volume was released on January 5, 2024; nine volumes have been released as of August 6, 2026.

No.	Release date	ISBN
1	January 5, 2024	978-4-253-29228-3
2	April 8, 2024	978-4-253-29229-0
3	July 8, 2024	978-4-253-29230-6
4	November 8, 2024	978-4-253-29338-9
5	March 7, 2025	978-4-253-29339-6
6	June 6, 2025	978-4-253-29340-2
7	October 8, 2025	978-4-253-00450-3
8	March 6, 2026	978-4-253-01215-7
9	August 6, 2026	978-4-253-01881-4
