= A Prince of a Friend =

Japanese manga series

- First tankōbon volume cover, featuring Mia Aida

王子様の友達 (Ōji-sama no Tomodachi)
- Genre: Romantic comedy
- Manga
- Written by: Sukeroku
- Published by: Fujimi Shobo
- English publisher: NA: Seven Seas Entertainment
- Imprint: Dragon Comics Age
- Magazine: DraDra Sharp
- Original run: March 17, 2023 – present
- Volumes: 5

A Prince of a Friend (王子様の友達, Ōji-sama no Tomodachi) is a Japanese manga series written and illustrated by Sukeroku. It was originally published as a one-shot on the Nico Nico Seiga under Fujimi Shobo's DraDra Sharp brand in October 2022. It later began serialization on the same website under the same brand in March 2023.

== Synopsis ==
Every girl Rui Akai has feelings for tend to confess to his childhood friend Mia Aida due to her appearance resembling that of a shōjo manga prince. Mia offers to train Rui to get better at romance by becoming his partner, but finds herself becoming attracted to him.

== Publication ==
Written and illustrated by Sukeroku, A Prince of a Friend was originally published as a one-shot on the Nico Nico Seiga website under Fujimi Shobo's DraDra Sharp brand on October 28, 2022. It later began serialization on the same platform under the same brand on March 17, 2023. Its chapters have been compiled into five tankōbon volumes as of July 2026.

During their panel at Anime NYC 2025, Seven Seas Entertainment announced that they had licensed the series for an English publication, with the first volume being released in February 2026.

No.	Original release date	Original ISBN	North American release date	North American ISBN
1	December 8, 2023	978-4-04-075239-6	February 24, 2026	979-8-89561-835-6
Chapters 1–8; Bonus Chapters (描き下ろし番外編, Kakioroshi Bangai-hen)
2	July 9, 2024	978-4-04-075515-1	June 23, 2026	979-8-89561-862-2
Chapters 9–16; Bonus Chapter (描き下ろし番外編, Kakioroshi Bangai-hen)
3	April 9, 2025	978-4-04-075864-0	October 13, 2026	979-8-89765-204-4
Chapters 17–23; Bonus Chapter (番外編, Bangai-hen); Bonus Chapters (描き下ろし番外編, Kakioroshi Bangai-hen)
4	December 9, 2025	978-4-04-075515-1	March 2, 2027	979-8-89863-464-3
Chapters 24–30; 番外編 (Bangai-hen); 描き下ろし番外編 (Kakioroshi Bangai-hen)
5	July 9, 2026	978-4-04-076476-4; 978-4-04-076477-1 (SE)	—	—
Chapters 32–37; 番外編① (Bangai-hen 1); 番外編② (Bangai-hen 2); 描き下ろし番外編 (Kakioroshi Bangai-hen)

== Reception ==
By July 2026, the series had over 400,000 copies in circulation.

The series topped Niconico's 2nd Manga General Election in the "Heart-Pounding" Category.
