= Gokujou Drops =

Japanese yuri manga

- Volume 3 tankōbon cover

極上♥ドロップス (s)
- Genre: Romance; Yuri
- Manga
- Written by: Hajime Mikuni
- Published by: Ichijinsha
- English publisher: NA: JManga
- Magazine: Comic Yuri Hime
- Original run: March 2008 – April 2, 2010
- Volumes: 3

Gokujou Drops (Japanese: 極上♥ドロップス; transl. "Finest Drops") is a Japanese yuri harem manga written and illustrated by Hajime Mikuni. It was serialized on Ichijinsha's mobile platform through Comic Yuri Hime from March 2008, to April 2010, and was licensed for an English-language release by JManga in 2012.

== Plot ==
When transfer student Maezono Komari finds herself with a dorm to stay in she winds up sharing a room with the aloof and beautiful Himemiya Yukio. However Yukio will only allow Komari to stay at the schools's most exclusive dorm if she agrees to be her servant. In a dorm of eccentric and provocative girls, the new unevenly matched room-mates find themselves falling in love.

== Publication ==
Written and illustrated by Hajime Mikuni, Gokujou Drops was serialized Ichijinsha's mobile platform through Comic Yuri Hime from March, 2008 to April, 2010. The series was collected in three tankōbon volumes from October, 2008 to November, 2009.

The series was licensed for an English release digitally by JManga in 2012.

No.	Release date	ISBN
1	October 18, 2008	9784758070331
2	May 18, 2009	9784758070492
3	November 18, 2009	9784758070638

== Reception ==
Erica Friedman of Yuricon criticised the first volume, finding that the series merely played into fetishes, "Sexual harassment, incest, public sex, non-con. And for that reason, I'm not really a big fan of the series. Sure, Yukio and Komari are in love, but that's like 1/25th of the Yuri. The other 24/25ths are for people who like their Yuri mean, and nasty." By the final volume she felt the series was repeating it; "there's nothing even remotely interesting in Volume 3, it's a tired rehash of everything from the first two volumes"

Cathlyn Melo included Gokujou Drops in their "11 Best Yuri Manga to Read in 2022", noting that while it has a very predictable plot, it will not prevent readers from enjoying the series.
