= Hajirau Kimi ga Mitainda =

Japanese manga series

- First tankōbon volume cover

恥じらう君が見たいんだ
- Genre: Coming-of-age
- Manga
- Written by: Rakure Umagome
- Published by: Kodansha
- Imprint: Young Magazine KC
- Magazine: YanMaga Web
- Original run: January 15, 2021 – present
- Volumes: 10
- icon

Hajirau Kimi ga Mitainda (恥じらう君が見たいんだ; lit. 'I Want to See You Embarrassed') is a Japanese web manga series written and illustrated by Rakure Umagome. It has been serialized on Kodansha's YanMaga Web since January 2021.

== Plot ==
Akito Shirasawa witnesses his classmate Kaho Honjou masturbating in their classroom. Enticed and bewildered, he decides to use his smartphone to film her doing the act, until Kaho notices him filming her. Kaho later makes a proposal asking him to film her while doing the act.

== Publication ==
Written and illustrated by Rakure Umagome, Hajirau Kimi ga Mitainda started on Kodansha's YanMaga Web on January 15, 2021. Kodansha has collected its chapters into individual tankōbon volumes. The first volume was released on July 19, 2021. As of March 18, 2025, ten volumes have been released.

=== Volumes ===
No.	Japanese release date	Japanese ISBN
1	July 19, 2021	978-4-06-523691-8
2	October 20, 2021	978-4-06-525092-1
3	February 18, 2022	978-4-06-526826-1
4	July 20, 2022	978-4-06-528108-6
5	January 19, 2023	978-4-06-530422-8
6	June 20, 2023	978-4-06-532054-9
7	December 20, 2023	978-4-06-533992-3
8	June 19, 2024	978-4-06-535925-9
9	November 20, 2024	978-4-06-537515-0
10	March 18, 2025	978-4-06-538927-0
