= Virgin Knight: I Became the Frontier Lord in a World Ruled by Women =

Japanese light novel series

- First light novel volume cover

貞操逆転世界の童貞辺境領主騎士 (Teisō Gyakuten Sekai no Dōtei Henkyō Ryōshu Kishi)
- Genre: Fantasy, isekai
- Novel series
- Written by: Michizo
- Published by: Kakuyomu
- Original run: February 24, 2021 – present
- Light novel
- Written by: Michizo
- Illustrated by: Melon22
- Published by: Overlap
- English publisher: NA: Seven Seas Entertainment
- Imprint: Overlap Bunko
- Original run: August 25, 2022 – present
- Volumes: 7
- Manga
- Written by: Michizo
- Illustrated by: Kotatsu Yanase
- Published by: Overlap
- English publisher: NA: Seven Seas Entertainment
- Imprint: Gardo Comics
- Magazine: Comic Gardo
- Original run: May 10, 2023 – present
- Volumes: 4

Virgin Knight: I Became the Frontier Lord in a World Ruled by Women (貞操逆転世界の童貞辺境領主騎士, Teisō Gyakuten Sekai no Dōtei Henkyō Ryōshu Kishi) is a Japanese light novel series written by Michizo and illustrated by Melon22. It began serialization on Kadokawa Corporation's Kakuyomu website in February 2021. It was later acquired by Overlap who began publishing it under their Overlap Bunko imprint in August 2022. A manga adaptation illustrated by Kotatsu Yanase began serialization on Overlap's Comic Gardo website in May 2023.

== Plot ==
A modern-day Japanese man is reincarnated as Sir Faust von Polidoro, a landholder and mighty warrior in a world resembling 13th century Central Europe, except that women outnumber men nine-to-one. His military exploits in service to his beloved late mother's fief bring him to the romantic attentions of Anhalt's royal family, while he learns of a potential apocalyptic threat from the Far East.

== Media ==
=== Light novel ===
Written by Michizo, Virgin Knight: I Became the Frontier Lord in a World Ruled by Women began serialization on Kadokawa Corporation's Kakuyomu website on February 24, 2021. It was later acquired by Overlap who began publishing the series with illustrations by Melon22 under its Overlap Bunko light novel imprint on August 25, 2022. Seven volumes have been released as of July 20, 2026. The series is licensed in English by Seven Seas Entertainment.

| No. | Original release date | Original ISBN | North American release date | North American ISBN |
|---|---|---|---|---|
| 1 | August 25, 2022 | 978-4-8240-0266-2 | October 28, 2025 | 979-8-89561-226-2 |
| 2 | March 25, 2023 | 978-4-8240-0439-0 | February 10, 2026 | 979-8-89561-227-9 |
| 3 | August 25, 2023 | 978-4-8240-0581-6 | June 9, 2026 | 979-8-89561-228-6 |
| 4 | May 25, 2024 | 978-4-8240-0826-8 | October 6, 2026 | 979-8-89561-419-8 |
| 5 | March 25, 2025 | 978-4-8240-1115-2 | — | — |
| 6 | November 25, 2025 | 978-4-8240-1408-5 | — | — |
| 7 | July 20, 2026 | 978-4-8240-1731-4 | — | — |

=== Manga ===
A manga adaptation illustrated by Kotatsu Yanase began serialization on Overlap's Comic Gardo website on May 10, 2023. The manga's chapters have been collected into four tankōbon volumes as of November 2026. The manga adaptation is also licensed in English by Seven Seas Entertainment.

| No. | Original release date | Original ISBN | North American release date | North American ISBN |
|---|---|---|---|---|
| 1 | November 25, 2023 | 978-4-8240-0667-7 | October 14, 2025 | 979-8-89561-229-3 |
| 2 | August 25, 2024 | 978-4-8240-0928-9 | February 24, 2026 | 979-8-89561-230-9 |
| 3 | December 25, 2025 | 978-4-8240-1463-4 | July 28, 2026 | 979-8-89765-388-1 |
| 4 | November 20, 2026 | 978-4-8240-1751-2 | — | — |

== Reception ==
The series was ranked second in the bunkobon category at the 2022 Next Light Novel Awards and third in the same category in the 2023 edition.
