= North Wind (video game) =

Adult visual novel

- North Wind promotional art for PlayStation 2

ノースウインド (Noosu Uindo)
- Genre: Drama, Romance, Harem
- Video game
- Developer: DreamSoft
- Publisher: F&C (Windows/iOS); Datam Polystar (PlayStation 2)
- Genre: Eroge, Visual novel
- Platform: Windows, PlayStation 2, iOS
- Released: JP: September 24, 2004 (Windows); JP: April 28, 2005 (PlayStation 2); JP: June 11, 2010 (iOS Vol. 1); JP: August 11, 2010 (iOS Vol. 2)
- Manga
- Written by: DreamSoft
- Illustrated by: Chinji Yaoroosu
- Published by: ASCII Media Works
- Magazine: Dengeki Daioh
- Original run: September 2004 – October 2004

North Wind (ノースウインド, Noosu Uindo) is an adult visual novel developed by DreamSoft (previously called FC03), which is a brand of F&C. It first released for Windows on September 24, 2004. The game was later ported to the PlayStation 2, and released in two separate volumes for the iOS. North Wind follows the player character and protagonist, Makoto Akizuki, a young man who was born into a town where every winter, a "Love Letter Festival" is held. Gameplay in North Wind offers branching plot lines, and a multi-choice navigation, where the player can attain multiple endings.

Media based on the game has been published. This includes audio CDs, art books, and a manga adaptation which serialized in ASCII Media Works' Dengeki Daioh magazine.

== Gameplay ==
North Wind is a romance visual novel in which the player assumes the role of Makoto Akizuki. Its gameplay mainly consists of reading and progressing through the story's narrative and dialogue. The game's text is accompanied by character sprites, which represent who Makoto is talking to, appearing on top of background artwork. Throughout the game, the player encounters CG artwork at certain points in the story, which take the place of the regular background art and character sprites. North Wind follows a branching plot line with nonlinear sequences and multiple endings, where the plot's direction is affected by the player's decisions.

Throughout gameplay, the player is given multiple options to choose from, and text progression pauses at these points until a decision is made. These decisions determine the sequence in which the story's events will occur, and progress the plot toward a specific heroine's ending. In order to view all plot lines in their entirety, the player will have to replay the game multiple times and make different decisions to progress the plot in alternate directions. In the PC version of the game, there are scenes depicting Makoto and a given heroine having sexual intercourse. However, in the PlayStation 2 and iOS versions, these scenes cannot be viewed.

== Plot ==
=== Story and setting ===
The story of North Wind takes place in a small town surrounded by the mountains. Every winter there, a special event called the "Love Letter Festival" is held. The idea, is that if you write a letter to the person that you have feelings for, and post it at the local shrine on 26 December, which is the day after Christmas, then you will get to meet that person. Makoto Akizuki, the main protagonist and player character, has been living in Tokyo for the last three years, and is now visiting that town.

=== Principal characters ===
Makoto Akizuki (秋月誠) is the protagonist of the game. He lived in Tokyo for three years before moving to the small town where his relatives live. Makoto is the only character to not be voiced in the game. He is accompanied by a junior at his school, Hakana Fuyutsuta (冬蔦儚, voiced by: Ayana Sumoto), who is also the main heroine of the game. She is very gentle and kind, but has a weak constitution. Another heroine in the game includes Yukika Yanagi (柳雪華, voiced by: Fūri Samoto), a mysterious girl who has lost her memory, but due to her bright, cheerful personality, she befriends Makoto quickly. Makoto also has a childhood friend called Kanon Ayakawa (綾川佳暖, voiced by: Michiru), she grew up with Makoto like a brother and sister since they were both little. Kanon has a very honest personality, and works part-time in a cafe.

An additional heroine called Ozaki Suzumi (尾崎鈴美, voiced by: Suzune Kusunoki) was added in the PlayStation 2 port of the game. Other characters include Misumi Komaki (小牧水澄, voiced by: Yuki), another childhood friend of Makoto, and is one year older than him. She is an older sister figure for him. The last heroine is Miki Kimizuka (君塚深姫, voiced by: Kanon Torii), a kind and polite shrine maiden.

== Development and release ==
Naizumi Mitomi worked as the director for North Wind. Haioku and Torishimo were the character designers for the game. The main scenario writers were Mugetsu Tomoe, Rōnin Moto, and Sakana Hiromori, Sakana also worked as the producer. The executive producer was Hiromitsu Sasaoka. Mikano took charge of the graphic progression supervision, and the graphics were handled by Miwaza Kamino, Hinata Mutsuki, and Hoka. KANZO handled the programming.

On September 24, 2004, DreamSoft released North Wind for the PC for both first press edition and regular edition, both rated 18 prohibited. Datam Polystar released the game on April 28, 2005, as a PlayStation 2 port, entitled North Wind ~Eien no Yakusoku~, again for both first press limited and regular editions. However, sexual content was removed and the age rating fell to 15+. On June 11, 2010, an iOS version was released for North Wind, this time all ages, entitled North Wind First Volume. Exactly two months later, on August 11, 2010, there was another iOS release, entitled North Wind Second Volume. The iOS versions are only partially complete.

== Media ==
=== Printed media ===
A short-lived manga adaptation of North Wind was serialized in ASCII Media Works' Dengeki Daioh magazine between September 2004 to October 2004 issues. Chinji Yaoroosu illustrated the manga. The manga was actually serialized in the same month of the game's first initial release. A 127-page fan book titled North Wind Fan Book was published by Ichijinsha on February 22, 2005. It contains a visual gallery, interviews with production staff, a large number of unpublished images, and also includes comments from the voice cast. The North Wind first press limited edition comes bundled with an art book entitled North Wind Extra Art Book, which contains various illustrations, and a preview at the manga.

=== Audio CDs ===
An OP single consisting of one disc entitled North Wind — Last Letter / have eyes only for you… was published on September 3, 2004. The CD contains the two main opening songs, as well as their instrumentals. North Wind's first opening song is "Last Letter (Snowdrop Ver.)" by Kiriko, which is five minutes and nine seconds long. The game's second opening song is "Have eyes only for you..." also by Kiriko, and is five minutes long. The CD does not include the ending song "Last Letter -Eternal Wind-" by Kanon Torii, who voiced Miki Kimizuka in the game, respectively. The disc's length in entirety is twenty minutes and sixteen minutes long.

Another music CD entitled North Wind Complete Tracks was published on January 28, 2005, consisting of two discs. The first disc comprises twenty two tracks, which are BGM in the game. The first disc's length in entirety is seventy one minutes and forty nine seconds long. The second disc comprises ten tracks, and contains insert songs, opening songs and an ending song. It also includes their full versions, short versions, and off vocal versions. The second disc's length in entirety is forty seven minutes and twenty eight seconds long.

== Reception ==
On Getchu.com, a major redistributor of visual novel and domestic anime products, North Wind was the fourth most widely sold game of September 2004 in Japan, the month and year of the game's PC release.
