= Love at First Memory =

Japanese manga series

- First tankōbon volume cover

俺ともう一度、初恋。 (Ore to Mō Ichido. Hatsukoi)
- Genre: Romantic comedy
- Manga
- Written by: Narumi Hasegaki
- Published by: Kodansha
- English publisher: NA: Kodansha USA
- Magazine: Nakayoshi
- Original run: December 28, 2022 – June 3, 2025
- Volumes: 5

Love at First Memory (俺ともう一度、初恋。, Ore to Mō Ichido, Hatsukoi) is a Japanese manga series written and illustrated by Narumi Hasegaki. It was serialized in Kodansha's shōjo manga magazine Nakayoshi from December 2022 to June 2025, with its chapters compiled into five tankōbon volumes.

== Synopsis ==
After surviving a car accident, Mia Takanashi, the heiress of the Takanashi Group, wakes up at a hospital with none of her memories, and is suddenly approached by four different men who all claim to be her fiancé.

== Publication ==
Written and illustrated by Narumi Hasegaki, Love at First Memory was serialized in Kodansha's shōjo manga magazine Nakayoshi from December 28, 2022, to June 3, 2025. Its chapters were compiled into five tankōbon volumes released from May 12, 2023, to June 13, 2025.

During their panel at Anime Expo 2025, Kodansha USA announced that they had licensed the series for English publication beginning in Q2 2026.

No.	Original release date	Original ISBN	North American release date	North American ISBN
1	May 12, 2023	978-4-06-531406-7	February 17, 2026	979-8-88877-714-5
1. "Sleeping Beauty and Four Prince Charmings"; 2. "I Love You, So I Want to Feel You"; 3. "Can't Kiss Through a Mask"; Bonus: Boss Bride Days Special Side Story
2	September 13, 2023	978-4-06-532926-9	May 12, 2026	979-8-88877-715-2
4. "As If It Were a Treasure"; 5. "Boys' Talk At the Diner"; 6. "The Waves Carry the Scent of Your Hair"; 7. "You Were My First"
3	March 13, 2024	978-4-06-534968-7	August 11, 2026	979-8-88877-716-9
8. "School Uniforms and Sweet Ice Cream"; 9. "I Remember the Warmth of Those Fingers"; 10. "I So Wanted to Be Near You"; 11. "He Embraced Me, Tears and All"
4	March 13, 2025	978-4-06-538799-3	November 10, 2026	979-8-88877-717-6
5	June 13, 2025	978-4-06-539783-1	February 9, 2027	979-8-88877-718-3

== Reception ==
The series was nominated for the 2024 EbookJapan Manga Awards.
