= S-Rank Bōken-sha de Aru Ore no Musume-tachi wa Jūdo no Fathercon deshita =

Japanese light novel series

- First light novel volume cover

Sランク冒険者である俺の娘たちは重度のファザコンでした (S-Ranku Bōken-sha de Aru Ore no Musume-tachi wa Jūdo no Fāzakon deshita)
- Genre: Fantasy
- Novel series
- Written by: Kametsu Tomobashi
- Published by: Shōsetsuka ni Narō; Kakuyomu
- Original run: June 2019 – 2020
- Light novel
- Written by: Kametsu Tomobashi
- Illustrated by: Tsubame Nozomi
- Published by: Overlap
- Imprint: Overlap Bunko
- Original run: June 25, 2020 – present
- Volumes: 7
- Manga
- Written by: Kametsu Tomobashi
- Illustrated by: Shunichi
- Published by: Overlap
- Imprint: Gardo Comics
- Magazine: Comic Gardo
- Original run: May 1, 2020 – present
- Volumes: 13
- Anime television series
- icon

S-Rank Bōken-sha de Aru Ore no Musume-tachi wa Jūdo no Fathercon deshita (Japanese: Sランク冒険者である俺の娘たちは重度のファザコンでした, Hepburn: S-Ranku Bōken-sha de Aru Ore no Musume-tachi wa Jūdo no Fāzakon deshita) is a Japanese light novel series written by Kametsu Tomobashi and illustrated by Tsubame Nozomi. It was originally posted as a web novel on the online publication platform Shōsetsuka ni Narō in June 2019, before Overlap began publishing it as a light novel under their Overlap Bunko imprint in June 2020. Seven volumes have been published as of March 2025. A manga adaptation illustrated by Shunichi began serialization in Overlap's Comic Gardo service in May 2020, and has been compiled into thirteen volumes as of November 2026. An anime television series adaptation has been announced.

== Plot ==
Kaiser, a young A-rank adventurer, sees his village destroyed during a dragon attack. In the ensuing chaos, he finds three abandoned babies, whom he decides to raise as his own. He decides to retire from adventuring, traumatized from the experience and being unfairly blamed for the village's destruction. Returning to his hometown to raise the babies, the three grow up to be skilled girls. However, as the three girls, Elsa, Anna, and Meryl, grow older, grow to be talented, Kaiser realizes that the three are overly attached to him.

== Characters ==
Kaiser (カイゼル, Kaizeru)
A young A-rank adventurer who failed to protect his village after it is attacked by a dragon. In the wreckage, he finds only three survivors: three babies wrapped in cloth. He decides to take care of them and retire from being an adventurer to raise them as his own daughters.
Elsa (エルザ, Eruza)
The oldest of the three sisters, she is a skilled swordsman. Despite her age, she was able to win a fencing tournament, already showing her potential. She has a protective personality, feeling a sense of caring towards her family and friends.
Anna (アンナ, Anna)
The second of the three sisters, she has shown acumen in business matters.
Meryl (メリル, Meriru)
The youngest of the three sisters, she is skilled in magic.

== Media ==
=== Light novels ===
The series written by Kametsu Tomobashi was originally posted as a web novel on the online publication platform Shōsetsuka ni Narō in June 2019; the web novel was also later posted on Kadokawa's online publication platform Kakuyomu. It was later picked up for publication by Overlap, which began publishing it as a light novel under their Overlap Bunko imprint featuring illustrations by Tsubame Nozomi, after which the series was deleted from Shōsetsuka ni Narō. The first volume was released on June 25, 2020; seven volumes have been released as of March 25, 2025.

No.	Release date	ISBN
1	June 25, 2020	978-4-86554-659-0
2	November 25, 2020	978-4-86554-779-5
3	June 25, 2021	978-4-86554-932-4
4	April 25, 2022	978-4-8240-0156-6
5	May 25, 2023	978-4-8240-0442-0
6	November 25, 2023	978-4-8240-0659-2
7	March 25, 2025	978-4-8240-1084-1

=== Manga ===
A manga adaptation illustrated by Shunichi began serialization in Overlap's Comic Gardo service on May 1, 2020. The first tankōbon volume was released on November 25, 2020; thirteen volumes have been released as of November 20, 2026.

No.	Release date	ISBN
1	November 25, 2020	978-4-86554-790-0
2	July 25, 2021	978-4-86554-963-8
3	December 25, 2021	978-4-8240-0072-9
4	May 25, 2022	978-4-8240-0195-5
5	November 25, 2022	978-4-8240-0346-1
6	May 25, 2023	978-4-8240-0511-3
7	November 25, 2023	978-4-8240-0672-1
8	May 25, 2024	978-4-8240-0840-4
9	November 25, 2024	978-4-8240-1003-2
10	May 25, 2025	978-4-8240-1201-2
11	November 25, 2025	978-4-8240-1423-8
12	July 20, 2026	978-4-8240-1755-0
13	November 20, 2026	978-4-8240-1949-3

=== Anime ===
An anime television series adaptation was announced during the "Great Overlap Bunko All-Star Gathering Special 2026" second livestream on July 4, 2026.

== Reception ==
Writing for Dengeki Online, reviewer Neon Onrai praised the first volume of the manga adaptation, finding Kaiser's conflicted feelings regarding the three girls as making the book captivating to read.
