= Harem (genre) =

Subgenre of Japanese media featuring multiple suitors

Harem (ハーレムもの, hāremumono; "harem works") is a genre of light novels, manga, anime, and video games focusing on a main character surrounded by multiple potential romantic or sexual partners. The term harem derives from the historical harem, a secluded part of a household reserved for women, and refers by analogy to a man associated with multiple women. Originating in Japan in the 1970s, its popularity increased during the late 1980s and 1990s with the advent of dating simulator games.

The genre often features a protagonist who is surrounded by three or more suitors, love interests and/or sexual partners. Harem works are frequently comedies that rely on self-insert protagonists which allow projection for the viewer, often accompanied with an ensemble cast of supporting characters.

A story featuring a heterosexual male or homosexual female protagonist paired with an all-female harem is informally referred to as a female harem or seraglios, while a heterosexual female or homosexual male protagonist paired with an all-male harem is informally referred to as a male harem, reverse harem, or gyaku hāremu (逆ハーレム).

Although originating in Japan, the genre later inspired variants in Western media.

== Structure ==
The most distinguishable trait of harem works is the presence of a single protagonist surrounded by multiple different characters who are treated as options for a sexual or romantic relationship. In some instances, the plot may follow an additional arc for the protagonist and these characters to embark on together; however, many harem works, especially dating sims, focus on the relationships themselves (and the tension and competition between different potential partners) as the key driver of the plot.

=== Characterization ===
Harem works may portray the protagonist as relatively passive or give them limited characterization, allowing the audience to identify with the character or project themselves onto them. Some works also limit the protagonist's relationships with other characters outside the group of potential romantic partners, keeping the focus on the main relationships.

Harem works may combine romance with other genres, including action and battle-oriented stories. For example, some manga combine harem elements with battle royale plots. Works with similar setups but less emphasis on comedy may instead be categorized primarily as romance.

During the 2010s, some popular Japanese web novels, including works associated with the narō-kei trend, featured protagonists who gain exceptional abilities and attract multiple love interests. Commentary on this trend has linked these recurring storylines to wish fulfillment and fantasies of success.

=== Ending ===
Most harem works end with the main character pairing up with one or more of their suitors, with some games and visual novels featuring branched endings dependent on player choice. A "harem ending" occurs in works where the protagonist ends together in a polyamorous relationship with all of the suitors.

=== "Reverse" ===
While most harem works focus on a male protagonist with women suitors due to the audience for harem shows being primarily male, "reverse" harem works focus on female protagonists courted by men and thus targets a mostly female audience.

=== Same-sex relationships ===
Although most harem works feature primarily heterosexual relationships, and cisgender and binary gender identities, works in the genre can contain characters of various gender identities and sexualities, including many yaoi and yuri harem works. An example of a same-sex harem anime would be Kyo Kara Maoh!, which features a male protagonist with male characters comprising his harem. Especially in dating sim visual novels, some works feature characters of multiple genders, with the player choosing whether to pursue an opposite- or same-sex relationship.

== Criticism ==
Some harem works have been criticized for their portrayals of women and romantic relationships. Critics have argued that female love interests can have limited agency or characterization beyond their relationships with the protagonist, with some relying on distinct visual traits or personality types to differentiate them. Other criticism has focused on the genre's use of passive protagonists and multiple characters competing for their affection, which some commentators have interpreted as reinforcing unrealistic expectations about romantic relationships.

== See also ==
- List of harem anime and manga
