= Kalaviṅka =

Fantastical creature in Buddhism

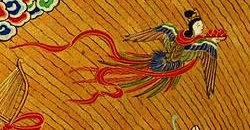
Karyōbinga in a depiction of the Amitabha Sutra

Kalaviṅka (Sanskrit: कलविंक kalaviṅka; Pali: karavika; Chinese: 迦陵頻伽; pinyin: Jiālíngpínqié; Japanese: 迦陵頻伽, romanized: Karyōbinga, Korean: 가릉빈가; Vietnamese: Ca Lăng Tần Già; Burmese: ကရဝိက် karawik; Thai: การเวก; Khmer: ករវិក karavik; Malay: karawek) is a fantastical immortal creature in Buddhism, depicted as having a human head and a bird's torso with a long flowing tail.

The kalaviṅka is said to dwell in the Western pure land and is reputed to preach the Dharma with its fine voice. It is said to sing while still unhatched within its eggshell. Its voice is a descriptor of the Buddha's voice. In the Japanese text, it goes by various titles such as myōonchō (妙音鳥, "exquisite sounding bird"), kōonchō (好音鳥, "goodly sounding bird") among others.

Edward H. Schafer notes that in East Asian religious art the Kalaviṅka is often confused with the Kinnara, which is also a half-human half-bird hybrid mythical creature, but that the two are actually distinct and unrelated.

== Depictions ==
=== In Burmese art ===
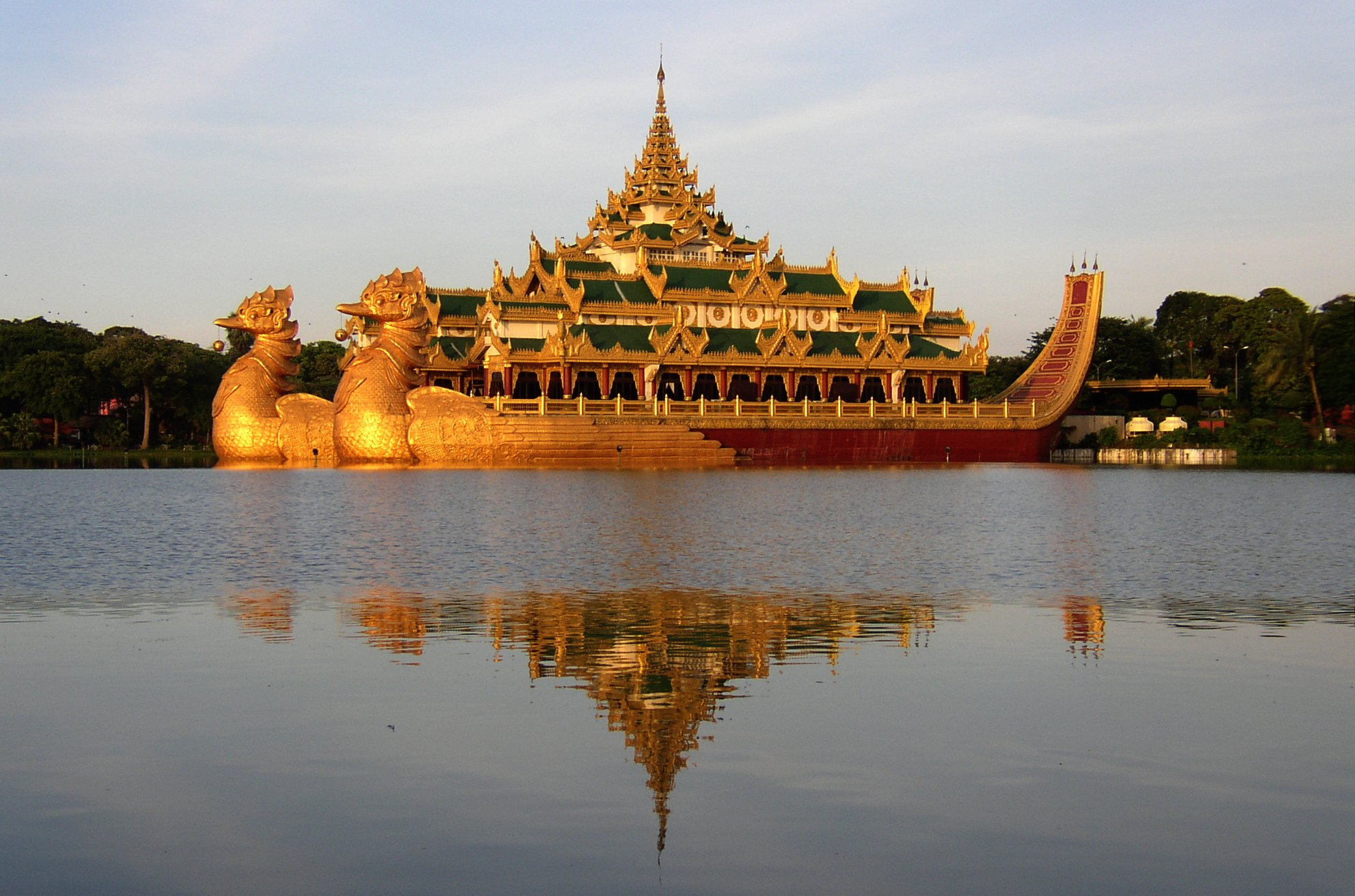
The Karaweik barge in Yangon.

The karaweik is commonly used as a motif in traditional Burmese royal barges. The Karaweik located on Yangon's Kandawgyi Lake is an iconic reproduction of the karaweik royal barge.

In Burmese art, the karaweik is depicted as a bird, rather than a bird with a human head.

=== In Chinese art ===
In Chinese mural art, it is portrayed as a human-headed, bird-bodied being. In the murals of Dunhuang (敦煌) they appear as figures both dancing and playing music.

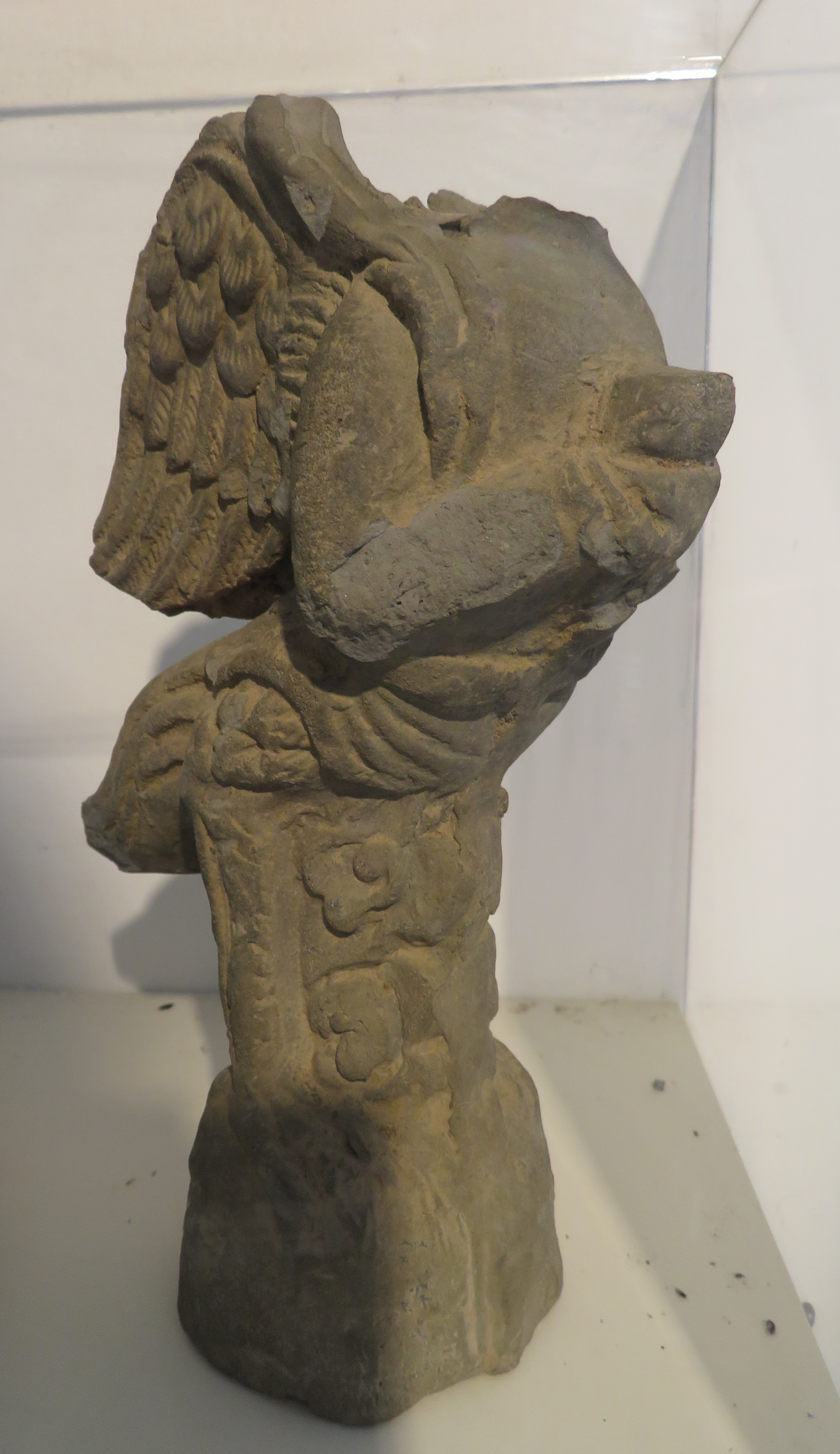
Grey pottery sculpture of a Kalaviṅka (missing its head) from the Yuan dynasty capital of Dadu.

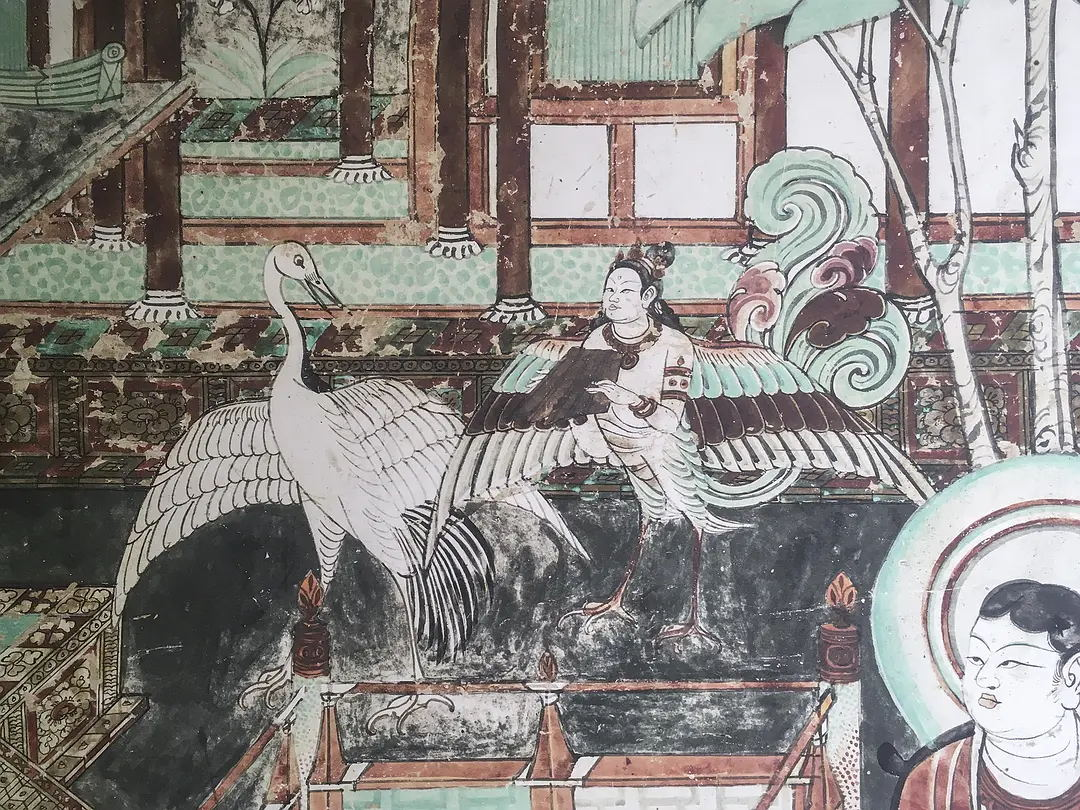
China, mid-Tang Dynasty. Artwork from the Dunhuang Grottos, Yulin Cave number 25 showing a Bird of Life (共命鸟), playing a panpipe.

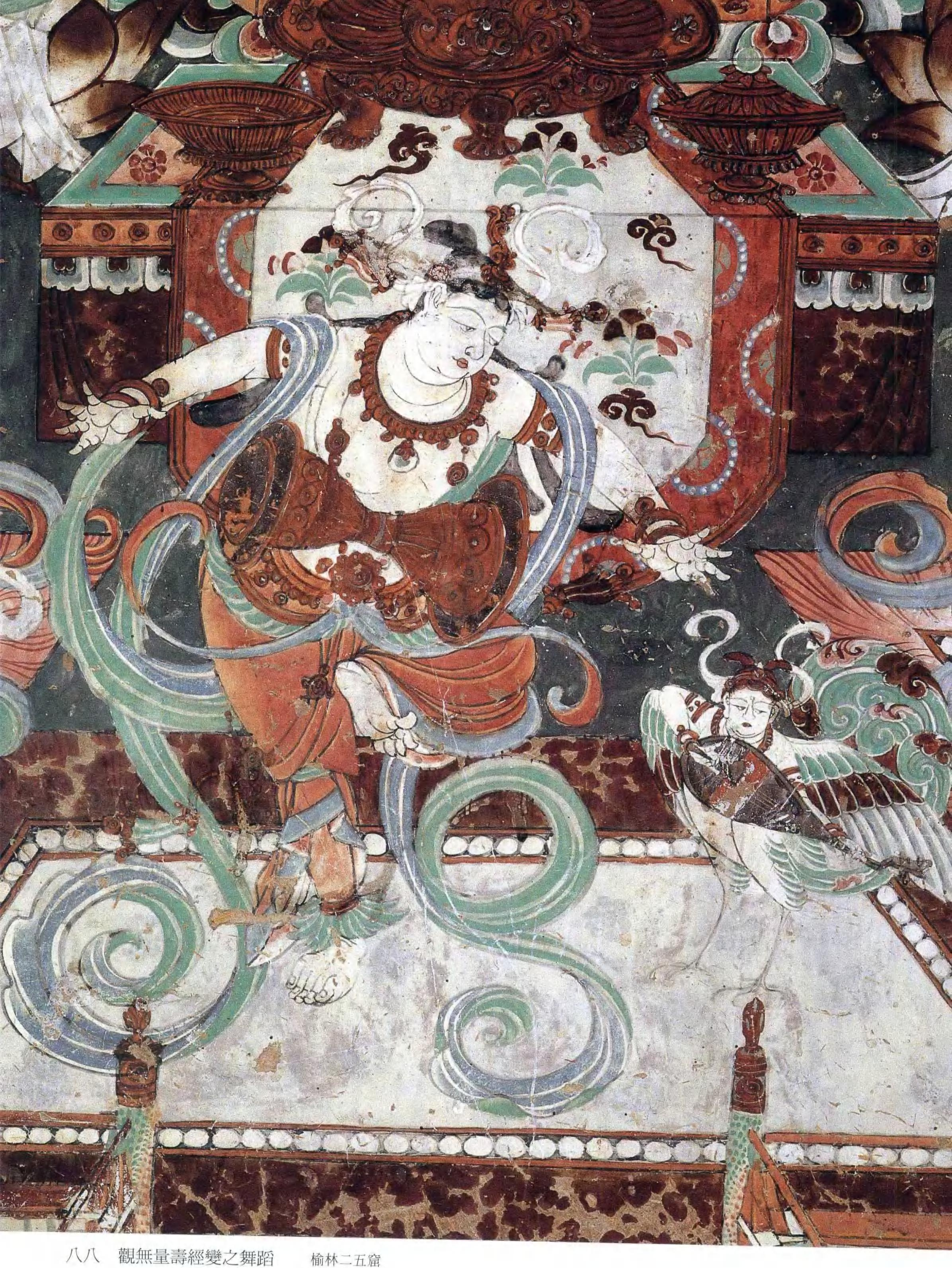
China, mid-Tang Dynasty. Artwork from the Dunhuang Grottos, Yulin Cave number 25 showing a Bird of Life, playing a pipa, with a dancer playing drum

=== In Japanese art ===
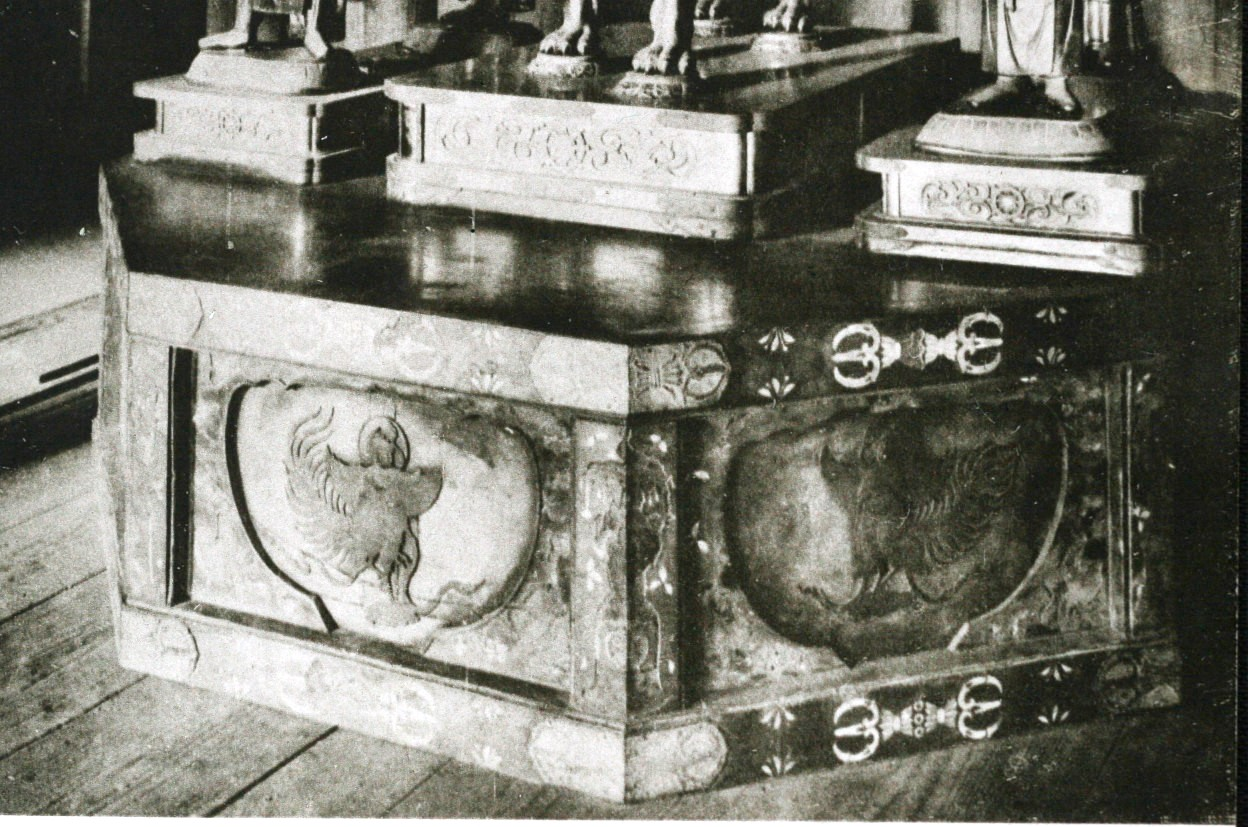
Karyōbinga, panels on octagonal platform. Chūson-ji

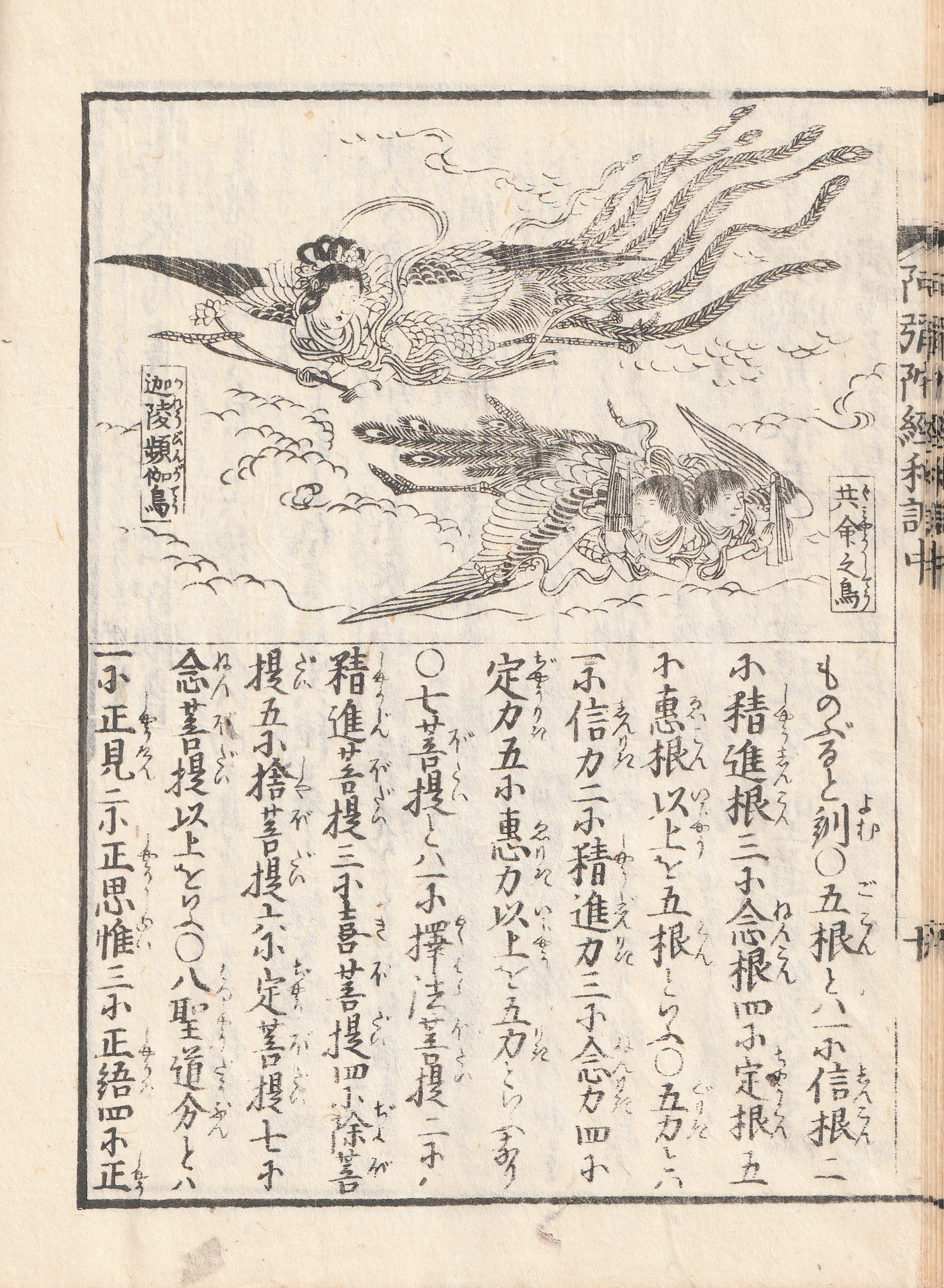
Kalaviṅka and jīvam-jīvaka(Two Headed Bird)

A well-known example is the pair of kalaviṅka carved in openwork (sukashibori) onto a Buddhist hanging ornament called the keman, used in the golden hall of Chūson-ji temple in Iwate Prefecture. The kalaviṅka from this ornament was commemorated on a 120-yen definitive stamp issued Nov. 1, 1962. The pose and general appearance of this piece are similar to the ones seen on the octagonal pedestal of the same temple (pictured right).

- In another keman from the Tokugawa period (see keman page), the creatures stand more bipedally erect and hence more humanlike.
- In the ancient courtly dance performance Gagaku - karyobin (迦陵頻) is the name of dance expressive of the kalaviṅka, and is danced in pair with the kochō (胡蝶), a dance of butterfly motif. The paired dancing is called tsugai-mai (番舞).
- A kalaviṅka painting by the brushstrokes of Hasegawa Tōhaku resides in Daitoku-ji (Kyoto), inside the Kinmōkaku (金毛閣) erected by tea-master Sen no Rikyū.
- Painted on the ceiling of Tōfuku-ji's Sanmon gate (Kyoto).
- Painted on the ceiling of Myōshin-ji's Sanmon gate (Kyoto), normally not open to the public.
- The Mizusawa Kannon at 214 Mizusawa, in the former city of Ikaho, Gunma, Main Hall, front right ceiling, painting of a heavenly woman with eagle-like talons, anonymous.
- Kawakami Sadayakko (Sada Yacco), billed as the first overseas Japanese actress, late in her life, built a villa located at Unumahōshakujichō, Kakamigahara, Gifu. The villa was christened Banshōen (萬松園) by Itō Hirobumi, and the room with the Buddhist altar has a ceiling painting of kalaviṅka, which may be peered from outside (but access to premises only on Tuesday mornings).
- Kalavinka is a brand of hand-built bicycle frames produced by Tsukumo Cycle Sports, primarily known for their NJS-certified frames used in professional Keirin racing (pictured right).
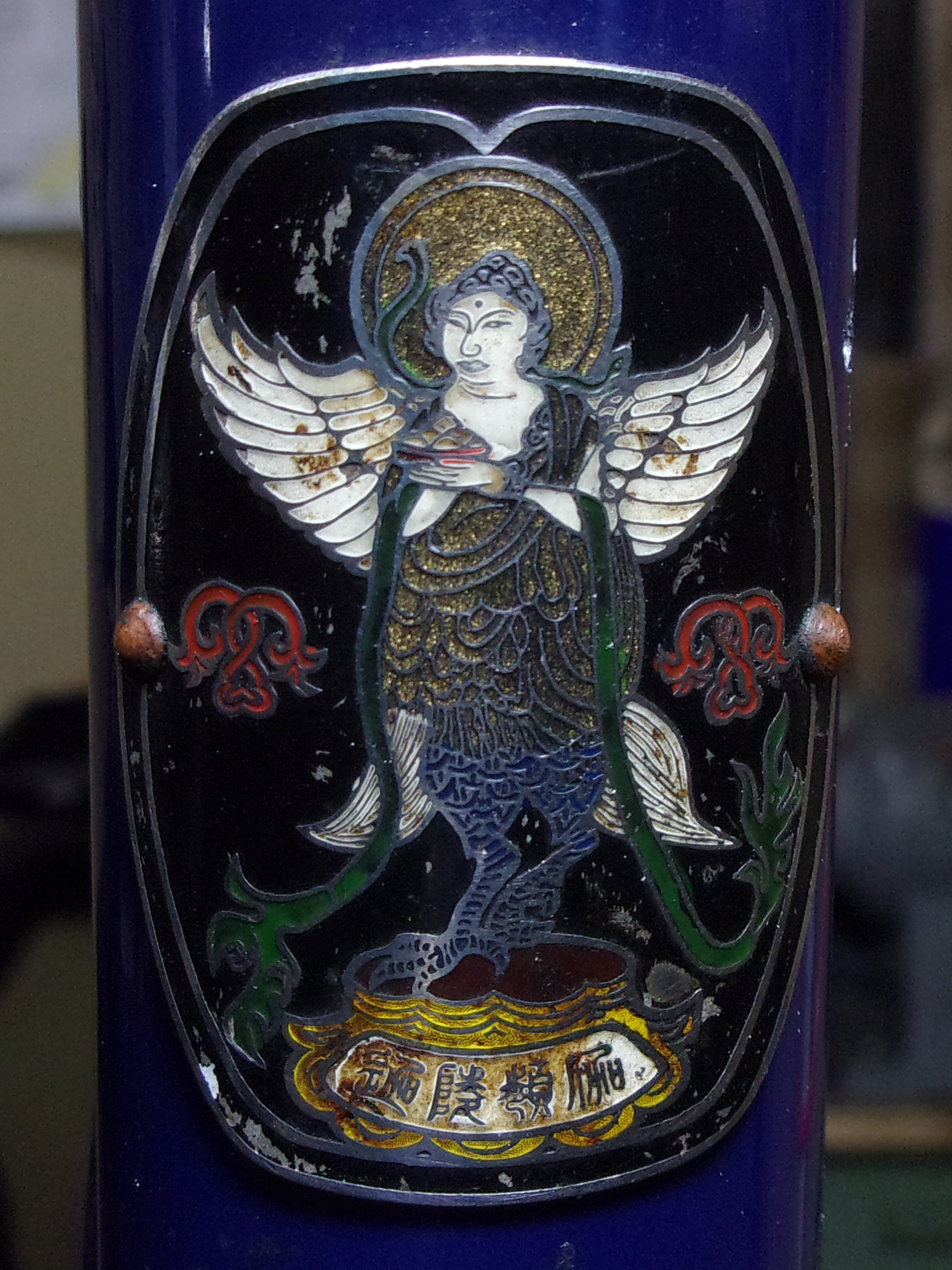
  Historic head badge of a Kalavinka frame, manufactured by Tsukumo Cycle Sports in Meguro, Tokyo.

=== In Tangut art ===
The Kalaviṅka is a common feature of Tangut art created during the Western Xia period (1038–1227).

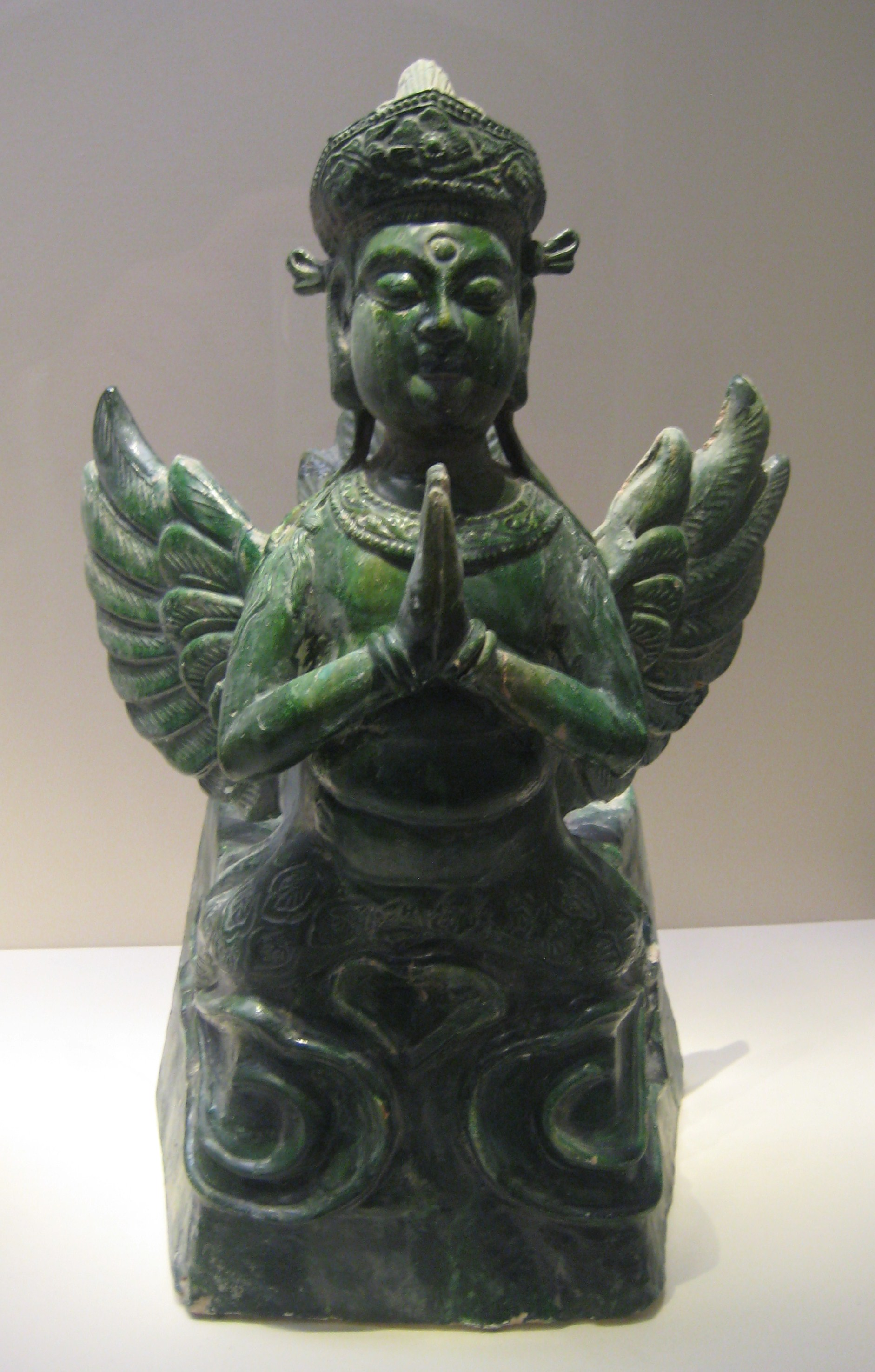
Western Xia Glazed pottery Kalaviṅka-shaped architectural ornament.

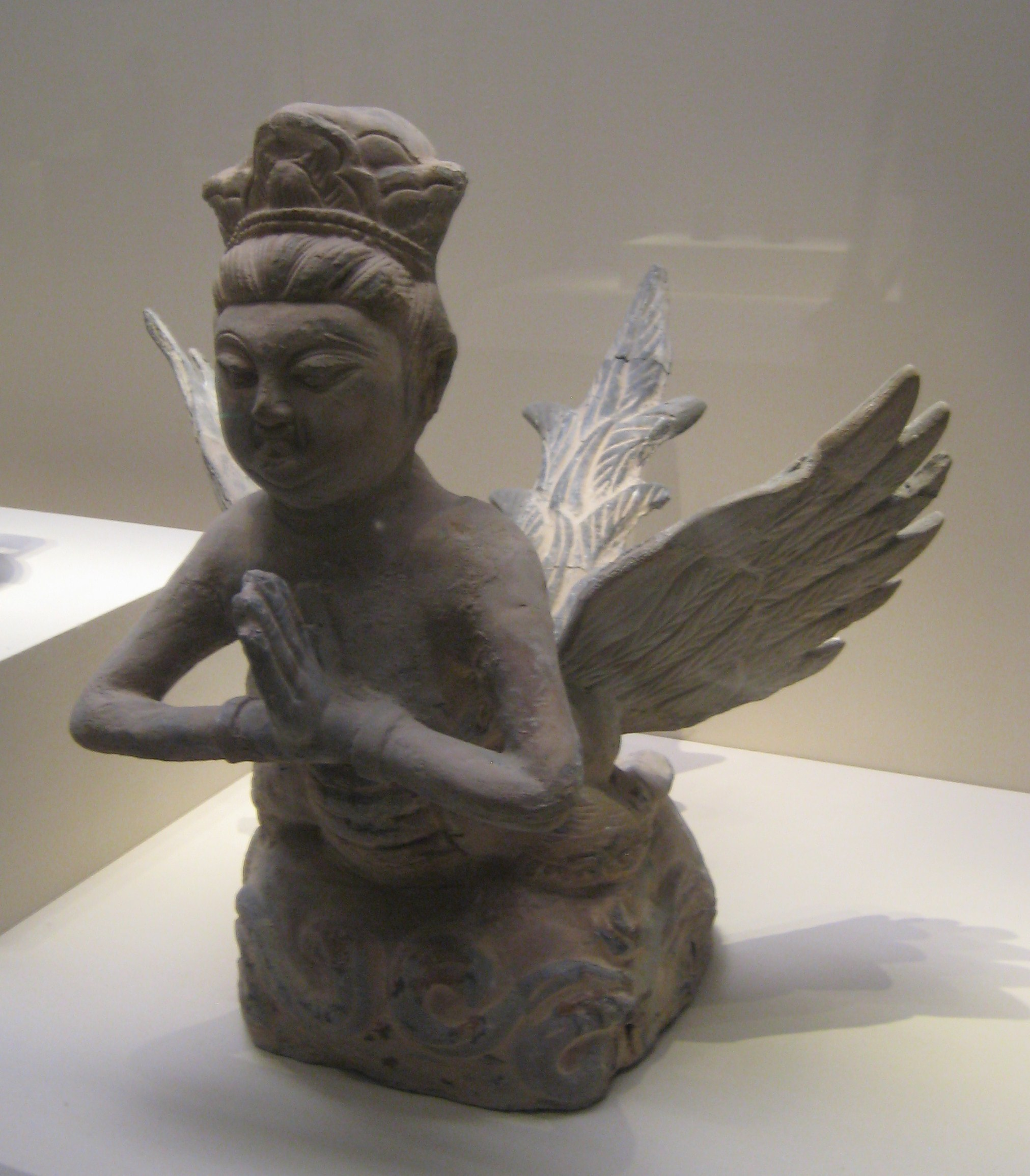
Western Xia Grey pottery Kalaviṅka-shaped architectural ornament.

=== In Hinduism ===
Kalavinka was born from one of the heads of Vishvaroopacharya, who was beheaded by Indra. Indra was angry when Vishvaroopacharya was found to be praying to demons instead of gods. Indra cut off his three heads, which respectively became Kalavinka, Kapinjala, and Tittiri (all birds).

== Popular culture ==
(Manga)

- RG Veda by CLAMP: Ancient Hindu mythology theme. A sickly princess character.
- Dream Saga (夢幻伝説 タカマガハラ, Mugen Densetsu Takamagahara) by Megumi Tachikawa, based on Amano-Iwato legend. A sacred bird character.

(Novels)

- Kōkotsu no hito (恍惚の人, An absent-minded man, 1972) by Ariyoshi Sawako. As "Kalavinka of Paradise", a moniker of some bird.
- Takaoka shinnō kōkai ki (高丘親王航海記, Record of Prince Takaoka's voyages, 1987) by Tatsuhiko Shibusawa. As "kalaviṅkā [... a] bird from the paradise of Hindustan", in a dream by the prince, mixing the bird's beauty with that of Fujiwara no Kusuko's, or "a bird in Yunnan with a face of a woman".
- Akame shijū ya taki shinjū misui (赤目四十八瀧心中未遂, The Akame forty-eight waterfall double suicide attempt, 1996) by Chōkitsu Kurumatani. As tattoo on the back of Aya, a female character.
- Nightingale no chinmoku (ナイチンゲールの沈黙, Nightingale's silence, 2006) by Takeru Kaidō, a bestselling medical fiction author.

(Music)

- Kalavinka by Buck-Tick
- Karyōbinga by Onmyo-Za

(Cycling)

- The Tokyo-based Tsukumo Cycle Sports's brand is Kalavinka. Many of the bikes feature the Karyōbinga kanji as well as a head badge which features the image of the karyoubinga with the head of a bodhisattva bosatsu and the winged body of a bird.

== See also ==
- Karaweik
- Garuda
- Harpie (Greek mythology)
- Putto
- Karura
- Inmyeonjo
- Kinnara
