= Mink (manga) =

Japanese series by Megumi Tachikawa

- Cover of the Japanese version of vol. 1, first released on March 3, 2000

電脳少女☆Mink (Saibā Aidoru Minku)
- Genre: Comedy, romance
- Manga
- Written by: Megumi Tachikawa
- Published by: Kodansha
- English publisher: NA: Tokyopop
- Imprint: Kodansha Comics
- Magazine: Nakayoshi
- Original run: September 1999 – January 2002
- Volumes: 6

Mink (Japanese: 電脳少女☆Mink, Hepburn: Saibā Aidoru Mink; Cyber Idol Mink in Japan) is a Japanese manga series written and illustrated by Megumi Tachikawa. Mink was serialized in the monthly shōjo manga magazine Nakayoshi from the September 1999 issue to the January 2002 issue.

== Plot ==
Mink Shiraishi, a junior high school student, buys a CD from her favorite band, Jagunna, but finds a mysterious CD-ROM inside. With the help of her best friends, Mahoko and Kanoka, they discover that the CD contains a software called WANNA-BE, which transforms users into their ideal selves. Mink tries out WANNA-BE, but her new form catches the attention of the media, including Motoharu Toriumi, the owner of the soon-to-be-bankrupt talent agency Bird Music. Om, a digital mascot assistant for WANNA-BE, informs Mink and her friends that the software is from the year 2099 and illegal; Mink and her friends must keep knowledge about WANNA-BE a secret, otherwise they will be deleted. Mink resolves never to use WANNA-BE again, but she decides to assume her other identity to help Motoharu and becomes an idol singer. She instantly becomes a hit, drawing the attention of Illiya, the frontman of Jagunna, and Azumi, a popular idol. While Mink works with Illiya to produce her music and stars with him in a television drama, she finds herself falling in love with Motoharu.

Meanwhile, Azumi becomes jealous of Mink's popularity and orchestrates a scandal for her. At the same time, a series of misunderstandings cause Mink and Motoharu to become emotionally distant, with Mink jealous of Motoharu's mentoring of a new rookie, Yuka, and Motoharu believing that Mink is in love with Illiya. Once the tabloids publish an article that suggests Mink and Illiya are in a relationship, as well as Azumi implicating that Mink will be leaving Bird Music to sign with Illiya's new record label, the general public turns against Mink. However, during the year-end Platinum Disk Awards, Mink's positivity wins them back, earning her the most votes for Best New Artist and beating Azumi.

Afterwards, Kyo, the creator of WANNA-BE from the year 2099, reveals himself to be the one who illegally used time-travel technology to send the software to the past. Viewing the government's ban of WANNA-BE as a dismissal of his accomplishments, Kyo uses an updated version to manipulate Mink's transformations to change their perception of the software, even causing Mahoko and Kanoka to transform as well. Mahoko and Kanoka join Mink to become the girl group Minkle, and despite Kyo's sabotage, Minkle maintains their success. Mink offers to be Kyo's friend after realizing he is acting out of loneliness, but the Cyber Security arrive from 2099 to arrest them for using WANNA-BE. The commander declares that Mink and her friends have until the end of December 31 to continue using WANNA-BE, after which they will delete all traces of Minkle's existence from the world. However, because Minkle had changed time too much and created a strong connection with their fans, everyone's memories of Minkle are restored. Minkle is allowed to continue using WANNA-BE, and they continue their pop star career.

In the series epilogue, Mink plans on confessing her true feelings to Motoharu, but her transformation starts malfunctioning again during a party on a cruise ship due to the wave frequencies from a nearby island. Motoharu eventually finds out Mink's true identity after he saves her from drowning, and the two begin a romantic relationship.

== Characters ==
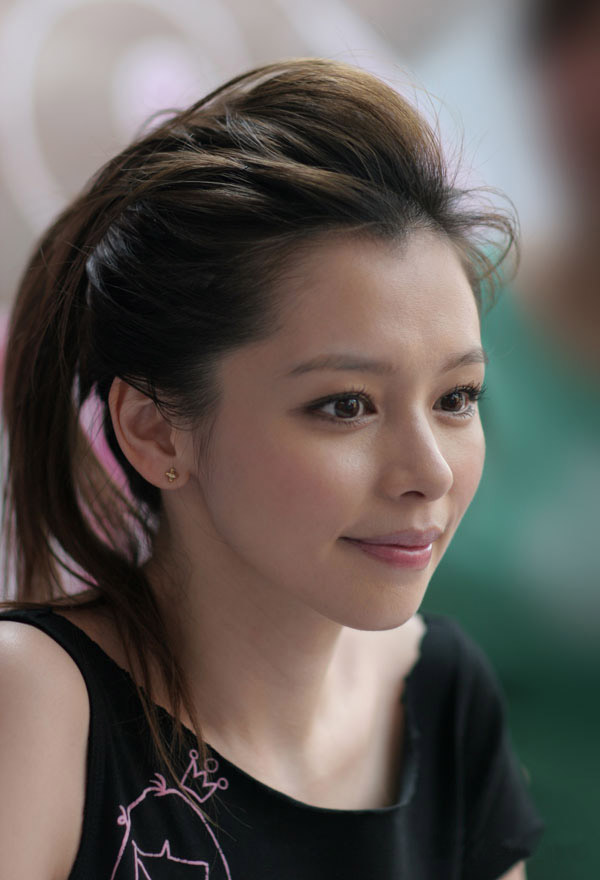
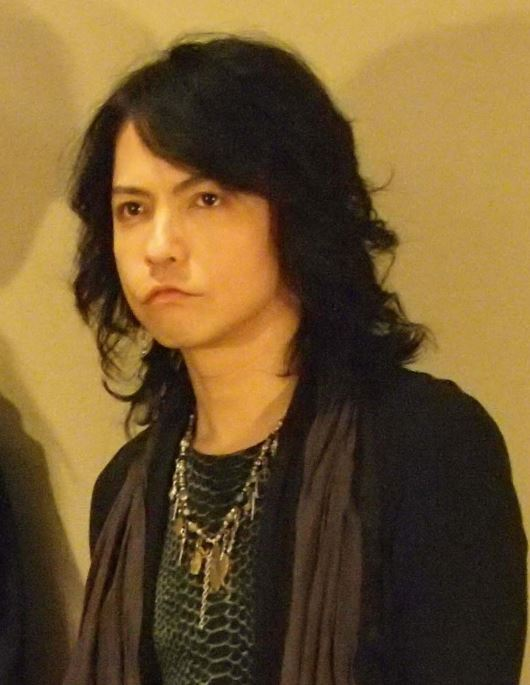
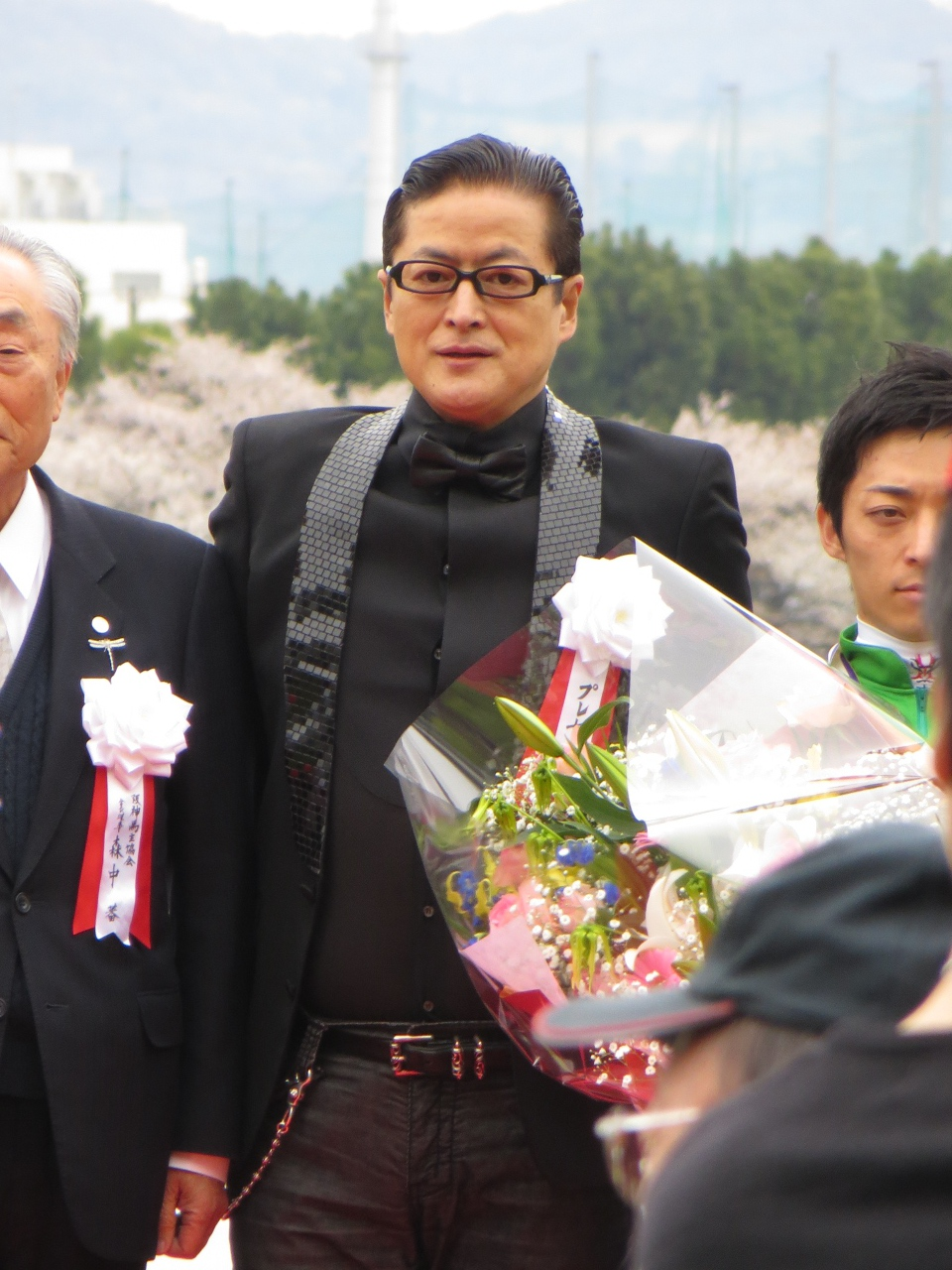
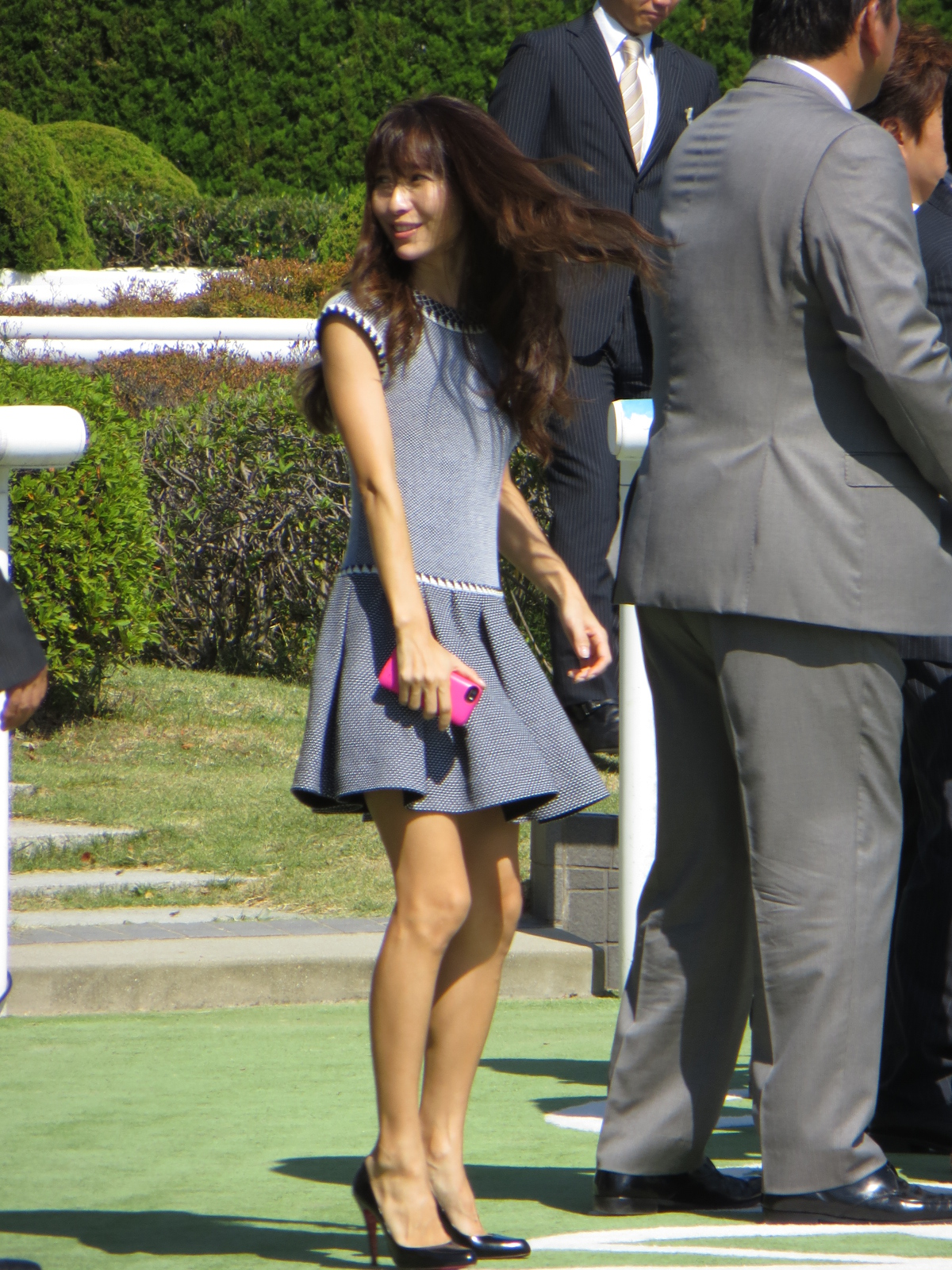
Tachikawa modeled several of her characters after celebrities. (Clockwise from L to R) Mink is modeled after Vivian Hsu (pictured in 2005); Illiya is modeled after Hyde (pictured in 2013); Azumi is modeled after Kanako Enomoto (pictured in 2014); and Johnny is modeled after Takanori Jinnai (pictured in 2014).

Mink Shiraishi (白石 みんく, Shiraishi Minku)
Mink is a second year junior high school student. She uses the software WANNA-BE to transform into Cyber Idol Mink. (Note: In the Japanese version, Mink's name is written in hiragana for her true form and in Roman letters when she is transformed. The English version differentiates by writing her name as "Mink" in her true form and referring to her as "Cyber Idol Mink" when she is transformed.) Tachikawa chose Mink's name by thinking of names that started with the "m" consonant, as she felt it suited Mink's "cute" design. Mink's design is based on Vivian Hsu.
Motoharu Toriumi (鳥海 素晴, Toriumi Motoharu)
Motoharu is a second year high school student who is left to settle his father's debt with his agency, Bird Music. He scouts Mink and becomes her manager. In Tachikawa's original concept draft, Motoharu's family name was Izaki and he was originally unrelated to Mahoko. Motoharu's design is based on Yoshihiko Inohara.
Mahoko Toriumi (鳥海 真帆子, Toriumi Mahoko)
Mahoko is Mink's best friend and Motoharu's younger sister. They do not live together due to their parents' divorce. By volume 4, Mahoko uses WANNA-BE to transform into Maco, a member of the girl group Minkle. In Tachikawa's original concept draft, Mahoko's family name was Itazaki and she was originally an assistant at Bird Music who was unrelated to Motoharu.
Kanoka Moriyama (森山 叶花, Moriyama Kanoka)
Kanoka is Mink's best friend and technology-savvy. By volume 4, Kanoka uses WANNA-BE to transform into Canon, a member of the girl group Minkle.
Om (オムくん, Omu-kun)
Om is a mascot of the software program WANNA-BE.
Illiya (イリヤ, Iriya)
Illiya is the lead singer of Mink's favorite band Jagunna and is described as a "charismatic artist". He produces Mink's music and also co-starred in a drama with her. After volume 3, he leaves to go to Los Angeles to establish his own record label, GIL (Golden Illiya Label). Illiya's design is based on Hyde.
Azumi Mizuhara (水原愛純, Mizuhara Azumi)
Azumi is a popular idol singer. Throughout the series, she becomes jealous of Mink's popularity and often tries to thwart her, only for Mink to become even popular. Azumi's design is based on Kanako Enomoto.
Johnny Hotta (ジョニー堀田, Jonī Hotta)
Johnny is a paparazzo nicknamed the "Celebrity Killer". Johnny's design is based on Takanori Jinnai.
Yuka Akane (茜結花, Akane Yuka)
Yuka is a new transfer student in Mink's class who is also employed by Bird Music as a rookie idol.
Kyo J. Falwell (鏡・J・ファーウェル, Kyō J Fāueru)
Kyo is an engineer from the year 2099 and the creator of WANNA-BE.

== Media ==
=== Manga ===
Mink, originally titled Cyber Idol Mink in Japan, is written and illustrated by Megumi Tachikawa. It was serialized in the monthly shōjo manga magazine Nakayoshi from the September 1999 issue to the January 2002 issue. A two-part conclusion was released in the 2002 edition of Summer Vacation Land (なつやすみランド), a yearly special issue of Nakayoshi. The chapters were later released in six bound volumes by Kodansha under the Kodansha Comics imprint.

Despite not being good with computers, Tachikawa had decided to use futuristic technology as a concept in creating Mink for the year 2000. In an interview with Nakayoshi, she stated that she worked closely with her editor for every chapter. For every chapter, the concept took 2–3 days, the outline and drafts took about 5 days each, and the inking process took about 3–4 days. Tachikawa stated that Mahoko and Kanoka were "fun" to draw because they act as "serious" counterparts to Mink, while she tried to make Illiya look as "cool" as possible.

In August 2003, Tokyopop announced they had licensed Mink for North American English distribution. In 2009, Tokyopop no longer held the license after Kodansha allowed their contract with Tokyopop to expire.

No.	Original release date	Original ISBN	English release date	English ISBN
1	March 3, 2000	978-4-06-178933-3	April 13, 2004	1-59182-715-9
1. "Birth of a Virtual Girl" (バーチャル・ガール誕生！！, Bāchuaru Gāru Tanjō!!); 2. "I'm Gonna Be a Star!" (あたし アイドルやります！？, Atashi, Aidoru Yarimasu!?); 3. "My First TV Appearance" (初TVでハプニング, Hatsu Terebi Hapuningu); 4. "Christmas Debut" (クリスマス・デビュー！！, Kurisumasu Debyū!!); 5. "The Love Song of Mink and Cyber Idol Mink" (みんくとMinkのラブソング, Minku to Mink no Rabu Songu); Manga essay: "Little Parakeet in Love♡" (コザクラインコに夢中♡, Kozakurainko ni Muchū)
2	September 4, 2000	978-4-06-178945-6	June 15, 2004	1-59182-716-7
6. "Chocolate Panic" (チョコレート・パニック, Chokorēto Panikku); 7. "A Ring of Angels" (天使のリング, Tenshi no Ringu); 8. "Won't You Be My Heroine? (Part 1)" (ヒロインになれない！？ 前編, Hiroin ni Narenai!? Zenpen); 9. "Won't You Be My Heroine? (Part 2)" (ヒロインになれない！？ 後編, Hiroin ni Narenai!? Kōhen); Special section: "The Prince of the Far White Sands" (黄砂の果ての王子, Kōsa no Hate no Ōji)
3	April 4, 2001	978-4-06-178933-3	August 10, 2004	1-59182-717-5
10. "Is Our Idol Really a Transfer Student?" (アイドルは転校生！？, Aidoru wa Tenkōsei!?); 11. "Angry Girl"; 12. "Beware of Scandals" (スキャンドルにご用心, Sukyandoru ni Goyōshin); 13. "Alice in Wonderland" (アリス・イン・ワンダーランド, Arisu in Wandārando); 14. "The Last Christmas" (ラスト・クリスマス, Rasuto Kurisumasu)
4	September 4, 2001	978-4-06-178970-8	October 12, 2004	1-59182-718-3
15. "Watch Out for Scandals! (Part 2)" (スキャンドルにご用心2, Sukyandoru ni Goyōshin 2); 16. "The Platinum Network" (プラチナ・ネットワーク, Purachina Nettowāku); 17. "Robot Virus Chaos" (ロボット☆ウイルス☆大混乱, Robotto Uirusu Daikonran); 18. "Circus Game" (サーカス・ゲーム, Sākasu Gēmu); 19. "The Birth of Minkle" (Minkle誕生！！, Minkle Tanjō!!)
5	February 4, 2002	978-4-06-178982-1	January 11, 2005	1-59532-423-2
20. "Boy Trouble!!" (デートでピンチ！！, Dēto de Pinchi!!); 21. "Version 2.0" (Note: In the Japanese version, the chapter was titled "Version 2".); 22. "Minkle in Hawaii"; 23. "A Midsummer Night's Meteor" (真夏のコメット, Manatsu no Kometto); 24. "Back to the Future" (未来からの鎖, Mirai kara no Kusari)
6	October 2, 2002	978-4-06-364002-1	April 12, 2005	1-59532-424-0
25. "Cinderella Limit (Part 1)" (シンデレラ・リミット（前編）, Shinderera Rimitto (Zenpen)); 26. "Cinderella Limit (Part 2)" (シンデレラ・リミット（後編）, Shinderera Rimitto (Kōhen)); Conclusion: "The Island of Shooting Stars (Part 1)" (星の降る島（前編）, Hoshi no Furu Shima (Zenpen)); Conclusion: "The Island of Shooting Stars (Part 2)" (星の降る島（後編）, Hoshi no Furu Shima (Kōhen))

== Reception ==
Anime News Network drew comparisons from Mink to Corrector Yui for integrating futuristic technology elements into the magical girl genre. Anime News Network also reviewed volumes 2 and 3 favorably, describing them as "saccharine". Da Vinci described the series as a light read perfect for a commute.
