= Enciclopedia română =

- Title page for Enciclopedia română (1904)
- Author: Corneliu Diaconovich, Asociația Transilvană pentru Literatura Română și Cultura Poporului Român
- Language: Romania
- Genre: general encyclopedia
- Publisher: W. Kraft
- Publication date: 1898, 1900, 1904
- Publication place: Romanian
- Media type: Print
- OCLC: 21109147
- LC Class: AE39 .D5

Enciclopedia Română was the first encyclopedia in the Romanian language. It was published in three volumes by the ASTRA.

The decision to published the Enciclopedia română was made at a meeting of the ASTRA on February 7, 1895. The Secretary of the organization Dr. Corneliu Diaconovich became editor in chief. The writers of this monumental work included may important figures; scholars, historians, journalists, literati and painters such as Grigore Antipa, Victor Babeș, Leo Bachelin, Valeriu Braniște, Partenie Cosma, George Dima, Ovid Densusianu, Ionescu-Caion, George Lahovary, Titu Maiorescu, Ludovic Mrazec, Constantin Rădulescu-Motru, Dimitrie Onciul, Theodor Speranția, Alexandru A. Suțu, Nicolae Teclu, Alexandru D. Xenopol etc.

The three volumes of the work were published by W. Kraft of Sibiu:

- Volume I, had 936 pages, contained 10,401 articles (from A to Copenhagen) 9 maps, 111 illustrations and appendices, appeared in 1898.
- Volume II, had 947 pages, contained 8,402 articles (Copepode to Keman) one map, 2 annexes and 20 illustrations, appeared in 1900. e-book
- Volume III, had 1276 pages, contained 18,819 articles (Kemet to Zymotic) 2 maps, 2 annexes and 16 illustrations, appeared in 1904. e-book
