= Dream Saga =

Japanese manga series

- Cover of Japanese volume 5

夢幻伝説 タカマガハラ (Mugen Densetsu Takamagahara)
- Genre: Fantasy, Romance
- Manga
- Written by: Megumi Tachikawa
- Published by: Kodansha
- English publisher: NA: Tokyopop
- Magazine: Nakayoshi
- Original run: February 1997 – June 1999
- Volumes: 5

Dream Saga (Japanese: 夢幻伝説 タカマガハラ, Hepburn: Mugen Densetsu Takamagahara) is a shōjo manga by Megumi Tachikawa. From the February 1997 issue to the June 1999 issue, it appeared as a serial in the Japanese manga magazine Nakayoshi. Kodansha compiled the twenty-seven chapters into five bound volumes and published them from October 1997 to September 1999.

It is a fantasy adventure tale about a young girl called Yuuki Wakasa, who one day acquires a magical red stone. The stone allows her to travel to Takamagahara (高天原 "High Plane of Heaven"), the dream world, when she sleeps, and can only return to Nakatsukuni (中ツ国 "middle country"), the real world, when she goes to sleep in the dream. Yuuki discovers that she must save the sun, Amaterasu, from being trapped and destroyed in Takamagahara, or the light will be lost from both worlds forever.

The manga has been translated and republished in German by Egmont Manga & Anime from November 2002 to May 2003, and English by Tokyopop from August 2004 to August 2005. The series has since gone out of print.

== Characters ==
Yuuki Wakasa (若狭 結姫, Wakasa Yūki)
Yuuki Wakasa is the heroine of the story. Because of her mother's personality she has to look after her three brothers, Kousuke, the oldest brother, and the twins Youichi and Youji. She uses Seiza for punishment. She is a loud, outgoing and clumsy 5th grader that can make everyone shut up. She was once a normal fifth grader until a strange stone fell from the sky in her hands. After that she was sent to find the four other stone bearers and save Amaterasu. Unlike the others, Yuuki travels between Nakatsukuni and Takamagahara in the same body. She is easily moved to tears by the plights of nature caused by noncaring humans. Yuuki is also called "Horizon Girl". She is also the next Lady Amaterasu. She also has a crush on Takaomi, which later on confesses her feelings towards him.
Takaomi Kai (甲斐 隆臣, Kai Takaomi)
Takaomi Kai is a boy in Yuuki's class and her crush. He has an older brother, but he never appears in the manga. In Nakatsukuni, he has a mellow attitude and cares about Yuuki which is about the only thing he has in common with the Takaomi in Takamagahara. The one in Takamagahara is 15 years old and a leader of a band of thieves. His hobbies are eating, sleeping, and hitting on every girl he meets. He says that he does it to be polite. He is very aggressive and violent. He also has a mysterious mark on his forehead.
Takaomi also is the recipient of a magic stone. He too has a part in the legend as he finds out after rescuing Princess Kana from the crystal snake. King Tsukuyomi reveals that Takaomi's role in the legend is to transform into the god of destruction and eat Amaterasu. This will destroy both worlds.
Binga
Karyubinga, or Binga to Yuuki, is a female bird. When Yuuki uses her powers, she can make Binga bigger anytime she likes. Only those with a magic stone can talk with Binga. Binga has a fiery temper.
Souta Inaba (因幡 颯太, Inaba Sōta)
Souta Inaba is in Yuuki's class. He enjoys studying and is very smart (which he often likes to point out, especially to Nachi). He tends to argue quite often with Nachi. In Takamagahara, Souta is a long-haired priest who predicts the future by dropping his stone into water. They use his fortune-telling skills to make money in Takamagahara, seeing as all of the others tend to get fired from their jobs because of their constant arguing. He has been researching "the end of the legend," and tells Yuuki that he never thought that he'd be part of that legend. Souta has a fear of ghosts. The symbol on his stone is "sariyasu" (cloth).
Taizou Hyuga (日向 泰造, Hyuga Taizō)
He goes to the same school as Yuuki, but is not in the same class. He's sort of a bully, and is said to have beaten a junior high student. He has an older sister (which was never shown), and he doesn't spend much time studying. He first meets Yuuki and the others in Takamagahara when he attacks Takaomi for the bounty on his head. He then finds a magic stone in the net that the poacher used, and that's when he gets his memories from Nakatsukuni. He then meets Yuuki in Nakatasukini when he discovers that she checked out a book from the library that he was going to borrow, telling her afterwards that there is another student in his class with a magic stone. He has a crush on Miss Nakime.
Keima Sagami (相模 圭麻, Sagami Keima)
In Nakatsukuni, Keima is Taizou's classmate. He loves to recycle things and invent things from the trash the gathers. He's good in school. In Takamagahara, he is an innovator. He still loves to sift through trash. He is 15 years old.
Nachi Izumi (和泉 那智, Izumi Nachi)
In Nakatsukuni, Nachi is Yuuki's classmate. He is good at sports, but he puts no effort into his studying. He will grow up to inherit his parents' company. He has a crush on Takaomi. In Takamagahara, he is the only one with a different gender. He is a 16-year-old girl. Nachi still has a crush on Takaomi.
Miss Nakime
Miss Nakime is Lady Amaterasu's assistant. She is smart, calm, but very lonely. She can't communicate with the magic stone holders very well. Taizou has a crush on her. She is losing energy as she supports Lady Amaterasu. She was the one who initiated the Amanoiwato Project.

== Development ==
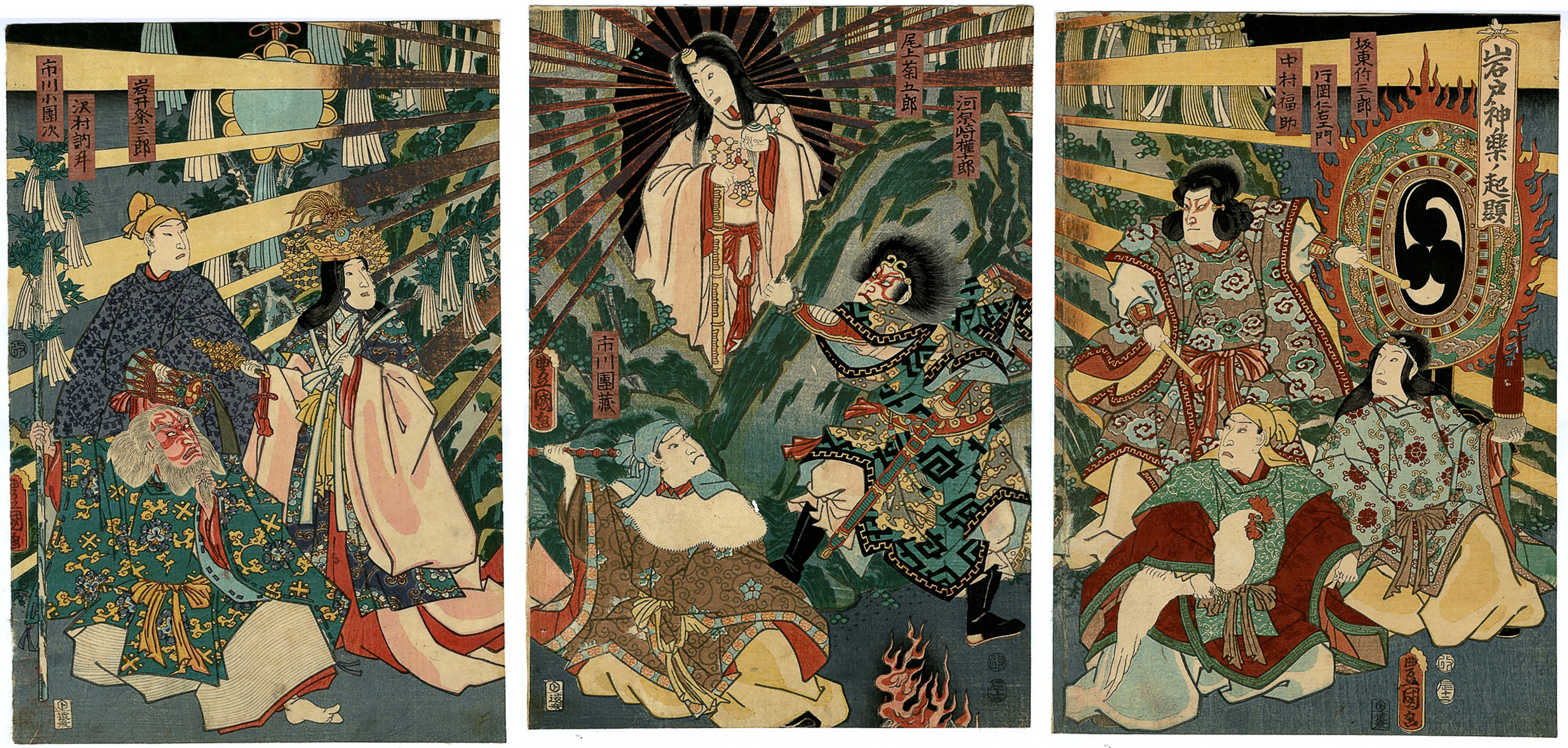
Among the elements Tachikawa incorporated in Dream Saga from Japanese mythology are the sun goddess Amaterasu (center) and the myth Amano-Iwato.

Manga artist Megumi Tachikawa created Dream Saga during the time that her previous serial, Saint Tail, was concluding. The genre, fantasy, was the first to be decided on, and she decided to draw on mythology. She consulted several books on the mythologies of different cultures, ruling out Greek mythology, as she felt that it was often seen in manga, and Chinese mythology, because one of her earlier works had dealt with it. Japanese mythology was decided on, as she and her editor felt that it was "familiar, but seldom-seen." The concept for the five magic stones was inspired by the Japanese fantasy novel Nannsou Satomi Hatsuken-Den by Bakin Takizawa, which centers on eight canines, each possessing a ball that corresponds to a virtue (e.g. loyalty and knowledge).

Despite drawing on mythology for Dream Saga, she included original elements, such as the 'Horizon Girl'. She also deviated from the mythology by altering the role of Tsukuyami, originally brother to Amaterasu, and using the myth of Takama-ga-hara, the home of the gods, only as a basis for Dream Saga's spiritual world. Aspects from other mythologies also appear in the manga: the character Karyubinga is derived from a legendary bird of the same name in Indian mythology. For the language of Takama-ga-hara, Tachikawa combined syllables primarily from English, Indian, Spanish, and Turkish.

== Release ==
Written and illustrated by Megumi Tachikawa, the twenty-seven chapters of Dream Saga appeared as a serial in the Japanese manga magazine Nakayoshi from the February 1997 issue to the June 1999 issue. The chapters were collected into five bound volumes by Kodansha and published from October 1997 to September 1999.

Tokyopop licensed Dream Saga for an English-language release in North America in 2003. It published the five volumes from August 10, 2004, to August 9, 2005. Tokyopop's translation has since gone out of print. Dream Saga has also been translated into German by Egmont Manga & Anime.

=== Volume list ===
No.	Original release date	Original ISBN	North American release date	North American ISBN
01	October 1997	978-4-06-178873-2	August 10, 2004	978-1-59182-774-0
01. The Beginning of the Legend; 02. The Counter-light Boy; 03. The Myth Returns; 04. Decision; 05. Those Who Hold the Magic Stones
02	February 1998	978-4-06-178881-7	October 12, 2004	978-1-59182-775-7
06. To Live; 07. Collecting Memories; 08. Takaomi and Takaomi!; 09. To the City; 10. The Shadow Behind the Name of the Moon
03	August 1998	978-4-06-178895-4	January 11, 2005	978-1-59182-776-4
11. The Past Hidden on Her Forehead; 12. The Princesses Under the Moon; 13. Sent By the Wind; 14. Aways Together; 15. The Barefoot Dancer
04	November 1998	978-4-06-178903-6	April 12, 2005	978-1-59532-210-4
16. The Legend Operation; 17. Japanese Romance; 18. The Girl in the Middle of the Storm; 19. Meister Alchemist; 20. The Guardian of the Crystal; 21. Starry Night
05	September 1999	978-4-06-178921-0	August 9, 2005	978-1-59532-211-1
22. The Day of Goodbye; 23. Victory Over The Darkness; 24. Decision; 25. To Tenjukyu; 26. Meet Again; 27. As Long As I Am With You.

== Reception ==
The first volume of Dream Saga placed 68th on ICv2's list of the 100 bestselling graphic novels for July 2004, with 1,429 copies sold.
