= Inmyeonjo =

Korean mythical bird with human face

One depiction of Inmyeonjo in the Goguryeo tombs

Inmyeonjo (Korean: 인면조; Hanja: 人面鳥; lit. 'human face bird') is a mythological creature from Korea that appears as a bird with a human face. Most of them are women, and some are male.

Inmyeonjo is known as a sacred bird that connects the sky with the land, often appearing in the ancient tomb mural of Three Kingdoms of Korea. In the case of Goguryeo, it can be found in several tomb murals such as the Anak County tombs, the ancient Dukheungri tombs, the Samsilchong, and the Mooyongchong. Named as Cheonchu(天秋) and Mansei(萬歲) in the ancient Dukheungri tombs in Nampo, South Pyongan Province in 1976, they are a symbol of longevity, known to live for a thousand years. In the case of Silla, the gilt-bronze shoes excavated in Gyeongju are shown. In the case of Baekje, four inmyeonjos are found in the Gilt-bronze Incense Burner of Baekje. In particular, there are many opinions that inmyeonjo in the Silver Cup with Bronze Stand (銅托銀盞) is the same as it in Goguryeo for a symbol of longevity. On the other hand, there are some opinions that it is Kalaviṅka because of the shape of the wings. Kalaviṅka is an imaginary creature that tells the Buddha's words that appear in ancient Indian myths and Buddhist texts.

The opening ceremony of the 2018 Winter Olympic Games in PyeongChang featured an inmyeonjo puppet that went viral on social media.

== Korean culture ==
A second depiction of Inmyeonjo in the Goguryeo tombs

In Korea, after the 5th century, artifacts and mural paintings that show the shape of a human-faced bird in Goguryeo and Baekje tombs are found. The inmyeonjo is depicted in the bottom of the Silver Cup with Bronze Stand(銅托銀盞) excavated from the Tomb of King Muryeong in Gongju of South Chungcheong Province. The creature's head is human, but the body and wings are a bird's, and the head is wearing a corolla with feathers of birds. In the tomb of Dukheungri in South Pyongan Province, and in the Mooyongchong in Manchuria, mural paintings are found. In particular, the inmyeonjo painted on the ceiling of the Mooyongchong had been wearing long hats that Xian loved to show the fusion of Buddhism and Taoism culture.

== Buddhist culture ==
It is interpreted that it contains the meaning to pray for Sukhavati(極樂往生) of Pure land(淨土) under the influence of Kalaviṅka (迦陵迦迦) of Buddhism found in the tombs of Goguryo and Baekje. Kalaviṅka is a bird that appears in the Sanskrit word "kalavinka" in Chinese characters. It is a bird that comes from Sukhavati of Amitābha. It is said that the upper part of the body is a human, and the lower part is a bird. It is also said to have a beautiful and strange voice before coming out of its shell. It has several other names and is considered a symbol of the Buddha's teachings. In Buddhist art in East Asia, including Korea, China, and Japan, there are a wide range of artifacts depicting Kalaviṅka, which are also shown dancing or playing music on the murals of Dunhuang.

Buddhism's depiction of Kalaviṅka is influenced by Indian mythology. Gandharva is a man whose an upper body is male, and a lower body of a bird or horse, and has a golden wing, while serving Indra in Hindu mythology and playing musics of Devaloka(天界). In Southeast Asian Buddhism countries such as Thailand, inmyeonjo is a god alongside Gandharva who are in charge of music.

Inmyeonjo also appears in traditional Chinese mythology and Taoism culture. It is recorded in the "Classic of Mountains and Seas". They are also said to have a bird's body on the face of a man and live as a name for a long time.

== Western culture ==
Creatures resembling the inmyeonjo also appear in Greek mythology. Homeros and Hesiodos records include the name Siren. At first, only the head was human, and the body was drawn as a bird, but gradually the entire upper body was depicted as a beautiful woman with musical instruments. Sirens were thought to seduce the sailors with a very sweet sound and sink their ships. In Virgil's "Aeneid", the name "Harpy" appears. According to legend, a harpy is a bird with a woman's face, flying faster than the wind and eating children and human souls.

== In the 2018 Winter Olympic Games in PyeongChang ==
The giant mythological creature, called “Inmyeonjo” in Korean, appeared onstage following the countdown in the opening ceremony of the 2018 Winter Olympic Games in PyeongChang. Many viewers focused on a giant puppet of a human-faced bird. It soon moved to the center of the stage, surrounded by the Four Symbols "blue dragon, white tiger, red phoenix, black tortoise" and dancing women dressed in costumes of the ancient Korean kingdom of Goguryeo. The animal's long neck and dragon-like body, combined with its human face, grabbed the attention of many spectators. “Through this, I wanted to depict a world where humans live in peaceful harmony with ancient nature and animals,” the opening ceremony's executive creative director, Song Seung-whan, said.

The inmyeonjo is a legendary animal that appears in East Asian mythology and Buddhist scripture as a fantastical creature with a human head and a bird's torso. Inmyeonjo is a fantastical animal known to travel across the land and the sky and live a thousand years, symbolizing longevity. It dates back to the Goguryeo period of Korean history, even appearing in cave drawings. The inmyeonjo is said to appear when there is peace on earth, connecting the heavens and the earth for a thousand years.

The appearance of the facial expressions of Inmyeonjo has led to a wide variety of responses from around the world. Some expressed that it was horrible and bizarre, deeming it unsuitable for children, while supporters stated that it was charming.

== See also ==
- Simurgh
