= Keman =

Ornament of Buddha

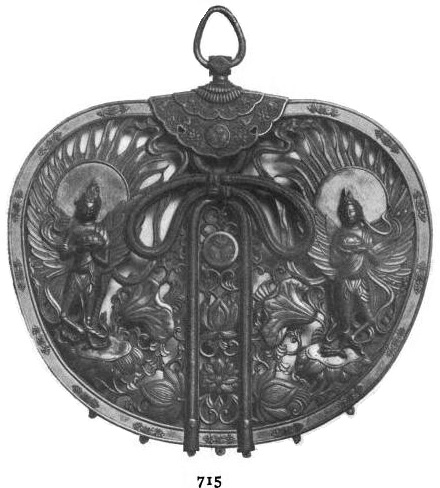
A keman from Iemitsu mausoleum at Shiba temple (Zōjō-ji), gilt bronze ca. 1630. Figures are prob. karyobinga though identified as Kwannon in catalog.

Keman (華鬘(けまん)) (Japanese phoneticization from the Sanskrit kusumamālā "Garland of Flowers"), is a Buddhist ritual decoration, placed hanging on the beam of the inner sanctuary before the enshrined Buddha, in the main hall of the temple.

As its Sanskrit name suggests, it originated as a term for fresh flowers strung together and tied in a loop, but became a name for such implements as used to pay respect to the dead (hotoke), and eventually signified ritual implements ornamenting the inner sanctuary (naijin (内陣)), corresponding to the chancel of a church.

They are typically made from gilt bronze in the shape of a round fan (uchiwa). Other materials used for making it are oxhide, wooden boards, or threads. The design may feature karyobinga (harpy-like beings), or use foliage scroll-work (karakusa) combined with the hōsōge (imaginary peony-like floral pattern), lotus, or peony. A well-known example is the keman from the Golden Hall of Chūson-ji in Northern Japan, designated National Treasure.

== Popular culture ==
- keman-sō (ケマンソウ) is the Japanese name for the wildflower "Lamprocapnos spectabilis" (also known under genus Dicentra; common name "bleeding heart"), so named because the flower's shape resembles the keman ornament.

== See also ==
- Phuang malai
