= Megumi Tachikawa =

Japanese shōjo manga artist

- Born: February 22; Tokyo
- Occupation: Manga artist
- Website: Official site

Megumi Tachikawa (立川 恵, Tachikawa Megumi; born February 22) is a Japanese shōjo manga artist, best known for the manga Saint Tail, which was also adapted into an anime series. She made her manga debut in 1992 with 16-sai no Tiara, which was nominated for the 'New Face' manga award.

== Works ==
- The Wildcat Constellation (one-shot)
- 16-sai no Tiara (16歳のティアラ) (one-shot)
- Asagao no Portrait (one-shot)
- Haru wo Yobu Orugoru (one-shot)
- Kujira ga Tonda Hi (one-shot)
- Hi~ Fu~ Mi~ (one-shot)
- Manatsu ni Just Meet (one-shot)
- Hot Typhoon (熱烈台風娘 read ホットタイフーン Hotto Taifūn)
- Yumekui Annainin (夢食案内人) subtitled: "The Dream-Eating Guidance Girl"
- Saint Tail (怪盗セイント・テール Kaitou Saint Tail)
- Dream Saga (夢幻伝説 タカマガハラ Mugen Densetsu Takamagahara, subtitled Dream Saga)
- Mink (電脳少女☆Mink Saibā Aidoru Mink)
- Delivery Boy ~ The Legendary House Keeper ("Delivery Boy ~ Densetsu no House Keeper")
