= Saint Tail =

Japanese manga and anime series

- Cover of the first manga volume (Kindle edition) featuring Meimi Haneoka as Saint Tail.

怪盗 セイント・テール (Kaitō Seinto Tēru)
- Genre: Magical girl
- Manga
- Written by: Megumi Tachikawa
- Published by: Kodansha
- English publisher: NA: Tokyopop (former)
- Magazine: Nakayoshi
- Original run: October 1994 – December 1996
- Volumes: 7
- Anime television series
- Directed by: Osamu Nabeshima
- Written by: Shinzō Fujita
- Music by: Hayato Matsuo
- Studio: TMS-Kyokuichi (Note: Credited as Tokyo Movie Shinsha until episode 4.)
- Licensed by: US: Discotek Media
- Original network: ANN (ABC, TV Asahi)
- English network: PH: RPN
- Original run: 12 October 1995 – 12 September 1996
- Episodes: 43

Saint Tail (怪盗セイント・テール, Kaitō Seinto Tēru; Mysterious Thief Saint Tail) is a Japanese manga series written and illustrated by Megumi Tachikawa which was published in Kodansha's Nakayoshi magazine from October 1994 to December 1996 and was compiled into 7 tankobon volumes. A anime television series adaptation by TMS-Kyokuichi aired from October 1995 to September 1996 for 43 episodes.

== Plot ==
Meimi Haneoka, the daughter of a former phantom thief and a stage magician, is an ordinary middle school student by day but the vigilante hero "Phantom Thief Saint Tail" by night. Using information obtained from her friend and classmate Seira Mimori, a sister-in-training, Saint Tail steals illegitimately obtained items and returns them to their proper owners. While Saint Tail gains a reputation as a local hero in her small town of Seika City, Meimi's classmate Asuka Jr., the son of a police detective, condemns her with the words "a thief is still a thief" and declares himself to be the one who will catch Saint Tail; however, when Saint Tail sees him assisting the police during her capers, he acknowledges her honorable motives and even steps in to protect her from physical harm.

Although Meimi is initially offended by Asuka Jr.'s arrogance and insensitivity towards others, she begins to find his genuine sincerity in chasing Saint Tail to be attractive and sends him calling cards to challenge him. Saint Tail agrees to make a promise with him to always send a calling card every time she embarks on a caper, and not allow anyone else to catch her before him.

Eventually, Asuka Jr. had secretly been worried about Meimi's well-being the entire time, but cannot completely express it due to his poor social skills. After one of Saint Tail's capers causes him to suspect that Saint Tail may actually be Meimi, Asuka Jr. realizes how little he knows about Meimi and develops an extreme obsession with catching Saint Tail to learn the truth. Meanwhile, Meimi begins to fear that Asuka Jr. would hate her if he learned about her identity, causing her to go into emotional isolation and withdraw from him further.

After repeated observation of Saint Tail's capers, Asuka Jr. comes to sympathize with her to the point he no longer believes she should be arrested, but still intends to "catch" her in order to protect her from the police or anyone else who would harm her. After concluding that Saint Tail has become an "ideal" who is treated more as a concept than a human being, Asuka Jr. realizes that his current stake in the Saint Tail chase is an extension of his feelings for Meimi, leading to him confessing his love to her. Eight years later, Asuka Jr. carries on Saint Tail's desire to protect Seika City by working as a private detective, and proposes to and marries Meimi.

== Media ==
=== Anime ===
No.	Title	Target Item	Notice Method	Original release date
1	""The Cutest Little Thief! She Will Steal Your Heart!" (登場! キュートな大泥棒!? あなたのハート盗みます., "Tōjō! Kyūto na Daidorobō!? Anata no Hāto Nusumimasu.")"	"Blue Meteorite" gemstone	TBA	October 12, 1995
A string of thefts convinces Asuka Jr. that Saint Tail is behind them.
2	""Wonderful Rival: Asuka Jr." (素敵なライバル! アスカJr., "Suteki na Raibaru! Asuka Jr.")"	"Electra" tiara	Written on the side of Saint Tail's balloons.	October 12, 1995
A notice by Saint Tail to Asuka Jr. starts rumors of the two working together.
TBA	"Special"	TBA	TBA	October 12, 1995
It's the autumn of reading, but Meimi and Seira are disrupted when a hot sweet potato vendor drives by. Meimi sets out to buy snacks for herself and her friend when Asuka Jr. shows up.
3	""Meimi's Love!?" (芽美の恋人はハリネズミ!?, "Meimi no Koibito wa Harinezumi!?")"	"Polar Tear" diamond	Written on a note left in Asuka Jr.'s text book.	October 19, 1995
Meimi plans to buy a hedgehog pet, only to have it purchased by someone with a devious plot for the animal.
4	""I Hate Wedding Veils" (ウエディングヴェールは大嫌い, "Uedingu Vēru wa Daikirai")"	Wedding Veil	Written on Asuka Jr.'s face while he's sleeping.	October 26, 1995
To stop a forced marriage, Saint Tail must steal a wedding veil.
5	""Legend of Happiness?! The Clock Tower Commotion" (幸せ伝説!? 時計台の大騒動!, "Shiawase Densetsu!? Tokeidai no Daisōdō!")"	Doll	Written on the back of a Wonder Garden flier (given by Meimi in a Wonder Garden animal costume).	November 2, 1995
Expensive statue figures decorate the Wonder Garden's Clock Tower. Asuka Jr. receives a note from Saint Tail saying she'll take the doll from the tower.
6	""New Student Rina. A Formidable Enemy" (強敵現わる! 噂の転校生リナ, "Kyōteki Arawaru! Uwasa no Tenkōsei Rina")"	"Cherry Blossom" painting	Appears on arcade screen after Rina gets game over.	November 9, 1995
A new rival appears. Rina joins Asuka Jr. on his pursuit of Saint Tail.
7	""A First Rendezvous of Tears?!" (涙! なみだの初ランデブー!?, "Namida! Namida no Hatsu Randebū!?")"	"Dagger of Yatto" replica	Written out with food in Asuka Jr.'s lunchbox.	November 16, 1995
After Asuka Jr. receives a theft notice from Saint Tail, Rina takes over operations to capture her.
8	""Danger! Beware of Lost Objects!" (ピンチ! 落し物にご用心, "Pinchi! Otoshimono ni Goyōshin")"	Lucky baseball glove	Written on a note exploded out from a soccer ball after the ball hit Asuka Jr. in the face.	November 23, 1995
Rina finds baseball tickets dropped by Saint Tail, and Meimi searches for lost baseball tickets. Rina wonders if Meimi could be Saint Tail, and plans to find out.
9	""Contest Hall in Chaos!" (コンテスト会場は大混乱, "Kontesuto Kaijō wa Daikonran")"	Wedding dress design drawing	Posted as a notice on the classroom bulletin wall.	November 30, 1995
A wedding dress design is stolen. Saint Tail plans to take back the design during the wedding dress contest.
10	""You... Confessed??" (告白...しちゃった!?, "Kokuhaku . . . Shichatta!?")"	Ruby jewel	Written on a note exploded from an egg Asuka Jr. cracked open to cook for breakfast.	December 7, 1995
Rina and Asuka Jr. make a deal: If Meimi is Saint Tail, Asuka Jr. must be Rina's boyfriend. If not, Rina will stop following Meimi around.
11	""The Big Scoop! An Uproar at the School Festival" (スクープ写真で学院祭大騒動, Sukūpu Shashin de Gakuin Matsuri Daisōdō")"	Camera film	Note appears in place of a photo from Sawatari's camera.	December 14, 1995
Sawatari from the school newspaper takes a photo to use out of context. Saint Tail plans to retrieve the film before it can be developed.
12	""Surprise! The Large Lizard Santa Claus?!" (仰天! 大トカゲのサンタ?!, "Gyōten! Daitokage no Santa?!")"	"Tama", a pet lizard	Note left on phone booth door.	December 21, 1995
A lost pet must be returned before its young owner moves away. An easy task for Saint Tail, until she learns the secret of Tama: it's a giant pet lizard, and Saint Tail is too afraid to steal it.
13	""Mystical Princess Rosa's Mirror" (神秘! ローザ王女の鏡, "Shimpi! Rōza Ōjo no Kagami")"	"Princess Rosa's Mirror"	Held by a Saint Tail doll which appears on top of Asuka Jr.'s head.	January 11, 1996
A valuable mirror has been stolen and placed in an auction. Saint Tail intends to steal back this mirror which reflects ones true self.
14	""The Platform of Love and Tears" (愛と涙のプラットホーム, "Ai to Namida no Purattohōmu")"	Bicycle	Written on the back of the package of Oden food Asuka Jr. buys which grocery shopping.	January 18, 1996
An American's bicycle has been stolen by a child. Asuka Jr. guards the boy's bike, awaiting Saint Tail's arrival.
15	""Run After a Jewel Thief! Little, the Naughty Dog" (宝石泥棒を追え! 迷犬リトル, "Hōseki Dorobō o Oe! Meiken Ritoru")"	Stuffed-toy racoon	Note explodes out from an envelope from in Asuka Jr.'s mailbox.	January 25, 1996
A stuffed toy with a jewel hidden inside is accidentally sold, then taken by a homeless dog in the park. It's up to Saint Tail to retrieve the doll before the jewel thieves can complete their task.
16	""Steal the Chinese Iron Chef!" (中華の鉄人を盗め!, "Chūka no Tetsujin o Nusume!")"	Chinese Iron Chef	Appears on an outdoors television screen.	February 1, 1996
While Detective Asuka investigates a shady outfit, Saint Tail challenges to kidnap the Chinese Iron Chef.
17	""The Heart Thief on St. Valentine's Day??" (バレンタインのハート泥棒!?, "Barentain no Hāto Dorobō!?")"	Tōru's notebook (misread as "Tōru's heart")	Posted on gallery wall in art classroom.	February 8, 1996
A misunderstanding leads Asuka Jr. to believe Saint Tail is out to steal classmate Tōru's heart, and right around Valentine's Day.
18	""Danger, Do Not Touch! Super Electric Trap" (さわると危険!超電流の罠, "Sawaru to Kiken! Chōdenryū no Wana")"	Metal weathercock monument	Written on the back of Asuka Jr.'s "Tomb Stones" live concert ticket.	February 22, 1996
Rina asks Asuka Jr. to a concert before Meimi is able to. On the same night as the concert, Saint Tail's plans to steal a metal weathercock, which unknown to her is set to electrocute anyone who touches it.
19	""A Comet Approaches! The Earth's Final Night??" (彗星大接近!地球最後の夜!?, "Suisei Daisekkin! Chikyū Saigo no Yoru!?")"	Graham's comet	Written on a note found in the snow.	February 29, 1996
A young boy is moving, and this will be his only chance to see Graham's comet through a telescope, but he and his friends are turned away. Saint Tail plans to steal the comet for them.
20	""Get Back the Phantom Bird Egg!" (幻の怪鳥の卵を 取り戻せ, "Maboroshi no Kaichō no Tamago o Torimodose")"	Legendary "Apua" bird egg	Notice explodes from a chicken egg while Asuka Jr.'s cleaning a chicken coop.	March 7, 1996
Saint Tail must retrieve a stolen egg before its authenticity is checked.
21	""Steal the Memorable Harmonica!" (思い出の ハーモニカを盗め!, "Omoide no Hāmonika o Nusume!")"	Harmonica	Written on a note found after following directional street signs.	March 14, 1996
A memorable harmonica is stolen, and its owner cannot win the music competition without it.
22	""The UFO Appears!? A Town in Panic" (UFO現る!? 街は大さわぎ!, "UFO Arawaru!? Machi wa Ōsawagi!")"	UFO photo	Parachutes down in front of Asuka Jr.'s house.	March 21, 1996
A fake photo of a UFO means big business for a museum. It's up to Saint Tail to retrieve the fake photo before anyone is fooled by it.
23	""A Fake Calling card? The Secret of the Perfume Trap" (ニセ予告状!?秘密の香水の罠, "Nise Yokokujō!? Himitso no Kōsui no Wana")"	"Parfum Takarada Special" perfume	A fake notice is left to Asuka Jr. in an envelope in his mailbox.	March 28, 1996
A fake notice from Saint Tail sends Asuka Jr. to a flower house where perfume is made. Saint Tail appears to set things right.
24	""Unforgivable! The Bad Guys Destroy a House" (許せない!家を壊す悪者たち, "Yurusenai! Ie o Kowasu Warumonotachi")"	Jewelry Box of memories	Appears on chalkboard as Asuka Jr. erases the board.	March 28, 1996
A house is lost to a loan company, but all a young girl wants from it is her box of memories back. Saint Tail must recover the box before the house is torn down.
25	""A Strong Foe! Confronting Elite Detective" (強敵! エリート女刑事と対決, "Kyōteki! Erīto Onna Keiji to Taiketsu")"	"Angel's Smile" statue	Appears on a paper from Sawatari's camera.	April 11, 1996
A master detective arrives to capture Saint Tail, which Saint Tail must retrieve a small statue for an ailing woman to see one last time.
26	""Meimi is Engaged to a Multi-Millionaire's Son!?" (芽美が 大富豪の息子と婚約!?, "Meimi ga Daifugō no Musuko to Kon'yaku")"	Madam Ranko's necklace	Explodes out from a soccer ball as Asuka Jr. kicks the ball.	April 18, 1996
A rich young man encounters Meimi, and instantly falls in love. With the approval of Meimi's school, he courts her with plans of marriage.
27	""Save the Pretty Idol Girl!" (美少女アイドルを救え, "Bishōjo Aidoru o Sukue")"	Locket	Note appears in a bubble.	May 2, 1996
Proof of a popular idol girl's relationship is in the hands of a rival. She must give up an acting job or the locket will be show to the media, unless Saint Tail steals it first.
28	""The Mayor's Ambition! Stealing a Swan (Part 1)" (市長の陰謀! 白鳥を盗め(前), "Shichō no Imbō! Hakuchō o Nusume (zenpen)")"	Crystal swan	Appears printed in a newspaper. This is another fake notice.	May 16, 1996
Rina tries to convince her uncle, the mayor, that Asuka Jr. has no plans on actually catching Saint Tail. The mayor gives Asuka Jr. one last chance: guard an expensive crystal swan sculpture on loan from another city.
29	""The Mayor's Ambition! Stealing a Swan (Part 2)" (市長の陰謀! 白鳥を盗め(後), "Shichō no Imbō! Hakuchō o Nusume (kouhen)")"	Crystal swan	Note thrown near Asuka Jr.	May 23, 1996
Asuka Jr. follows after the stolen swan, only to find himself in the middle of a larger plot. When the two are locked in a room together, Asuka Jr. and Saint Tail must compromise to get the sculpture back before it's sold overseas.
30	""Her True Character Revealed! Meimi's Critical Moment" (正体がバレる! 芽美危機一髪, "Shōtai ga Bareru! Meimi Kiki Ippatsu")"	Music box	Explodes out from tiny pink ball in Asuka Jr.'s sweater.	June 6, 1996
Sawatari takes a photo of Meimi playing with her hedgehog, Ruby, outside. Upon seeing the photo, Asuka Jr. recognizes the pet from an early encounter with Saint Tail, leading him to demand answers from Meimi.
31	""Steal the Jewel of the Moon!" (月の宝石を盗め!, "Tsuki no Hōseki o Nusume!")"	"Jewel of the Moon" jewel	Written on Asuka Jr.'s bath towel.	June 13, 1996
A thief hopes to make amends for his past mistakes, but may return to a life of crime unless Saint Tail arrives first.
32	""Steal a Woman's Marathon Running Shoes" (女子マラソン選手の 靴を盗め, "Joshi Marason Senshu no Kutsu o Nusume")"	Running shoes	Appears written on a banner in the city.	June 20, 1996
A marathon runner's efforts are being sabotaged. Her only chance to win is if Saint Tail steals back her stolen custom shoes.
33	""A Swordswoman's Wish! To Seal the Excellent Sword" (少女剣士の願い! 名刀を盗め, "Shōjo Keishi no Onegai! Meitō o Nusume")"	"Munemasa" sword	Written on a note posted on a spare tire on back of a passing car.	June 27, 1996
A wonderful blade is won through cheating, and Meimi vows to steal it back. Saint Tail encounters another thief, Mouse, who's been stealing swords.
34	""Return the Thoroughbred!" (サラブレッドを取り戻せ!, "Sarabureddo o Torimodose!")"	"Billy" (a horse)	Appears in skywriting by fireworks.	July 4, 1996
A horse has been taken, and is on a train to leave town. Saint Tail must take back the horse while avoiding Asuka Jr. on the train.
35	""Get Back the 'Tree of Happiness'" (”幸福の樹”を取り戻せ!, "'Kōfuku no Ki' o Torimodose!")"	"Tree of Happiness"	Appears on a note on an exploding flower.	July 11, 1996
A gardener's only wish is to see a tree he healed be spared. With magic on her side, Saint Tail sets out to steal back the "Tree of Happiness".
36	""A Precious Creature of Nature: Save the Beautiful Butterfly!" (自然の宝·美しき蝶を守れ, "Shizen no Takara—Utsukushiki Chō o Mamore")"	"Yamano Ömurasaki" butterflies	On Asuka Jr.'s popsicle stick.	July 18, 1996
Rare butterflies are illegally captured. After receiving a notice from Saint Tail, Asuka Jr. sets out to discover their hidden location before the thief arrives to take them.
37	""Phantasmal Masterpiece! A Woman Detective is Back" (幻の名画! 帰ってきた女探偵, "Maboroshi no Meiga! Kaettekita Onna Tantei")"	"Wings of Freedom" painting	Explodes from Detective Asuka's bouquet of roses.	July 25, 1996
A detective returns to Japan to restore her family's honor, even if it means stealing. Saint Tail plans to find the painting to steal, herself.
38	""A Burst of Laughter! The Detective Team Does a Great Job" (爆笑! ドタバタ探偵団大活躍, "Bakushō! Dotabata Tanteidan Ōkatsuyaku")"	Bronze dolphin	Explodes from a floating green ball from in Asuka Jr.'s pocket.	August 1, 1996
Classmates Kyoko and Ryoko form a detective team to capture Saint Tail before Asuka Jr. can. They enlist Meimi as a member, and expect her to show up at Saint Tail's next caper.
39	""'White Dolphin' - Return to the Sea!" (”白いイルカ”を海へ帰せ!, "'Shiroi Iruka' o Umi e Kaese!")"	"Pearl Dolphin"	Explodes from a pigeon egg left on top of Asuka Jr.'s head.	August 8, 1996
Meimi and Asuka Jr. spend time together at an aquarium, where they encounter a white dolphin meant to be free.
40	""Mom's Secret! A Female Thief's Vengeance" (母の秘密! 女怪盗の復しゅう, "Haha no Himitsu! Jokaitō no Fukushū")"	"Star Ruby" jewel	Appears from a parachute as it floats by Asuka Jr.	August 15, 1996
The secret behind Meimi's mother's past is revealed. Meimi hopes to steal back a jewel to close the final chapter on her mother's past life of crime.
41	""A Formidable Foe!? A Mischievous Pixie's Trap!" (強敵!? かわいい悪魔のワナ!, "Kyōteki!? Kawaii Akuma no Wana!")"	Solid-gold statue of Mary	Note appears in Asuka Jr.'s lunchbox.	August 22, 1996
A young fortune teller, Maju, uses her power to steal from her visitors. Saint Tail must retrieve the stolen statue, but if Asuka Jr. meets with Maju, Meimi's identity could be revealed.
42	""Mom's Enemy! Rosemary's Conspiracy" (母の敵! ローズマリーの陰謀, "Haha no Teki! Rōzumarī no Imbō")"	Rings and other items from Rosemary	Appears on a blimp.	September 5, 1996
Rumors are going around that Saint Tail has been stealing countless items. Asuka Jr. holds faith in Saint Tail, but Meimi knows she must take action to clear her name quickly.
43	""The Final Battle! Save Asuka Jr." (最後の戦い! アスカを救え, "Saigo no Tatakai! Asuka o Sukue")"	Asuka Jr.	Ruby delivers the notice.	September 12, 1996
Asuka Jr. has been missing, and Meimi fears he's been kidnapped. From his place of captivity, Asuka Jr. tries to fathom why Meimi hid her identity of Saint Tail. Meimi prepares to save Asuka Jr. at any cost.

It has 2 English dubs, one originated from The Philippines, called "Sweet Tales Of St. Tail" which aired on Radio Philippines Network on Friday Nights and it aired from 1997–1998, even though no full episodes have been currently archived, and only 2 trailers have been found. The second one is the American dub by Tokyopop, but it only has 15 episodes dubbed, while the rest of the episodes are subbed.

=== Manga ===
Tokyopop licensed Saint Tail for an English-language translation in North America, and published it from April 23, 2001, to December 10, 2002. This translation has since gone out of print.

== 2017 contest ==
In 2017, Kodansha held a contest through pixiv for fans of Megumi Tachikawa's Saint Tail to become the artist for the "next generation" version of the manga. The contest asked fans to create the story of a new phantom thief who appears in Seika City.

Shiki Yamori was the contest's winner and became the creator of the sequel series, Kaitou Saint Tail Girls!. The sequel received 4 chapters before being cancelled.
