= Kanako Enomoto =

Japanese actress

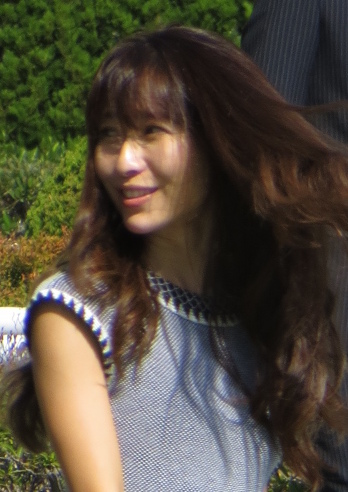
Kanako Enomoto, in 2013

Kanako Enomoto (榎本 加奈子 Enomoto Kanako, born 29 September 1980) is a Japanese actress.

== Career ==
Enomoto first attracted public attention at age 12 when she was selected the Astel phone company's spokesmodel. By 14, she had become one of the many "J-Idol" girls with the publication of her first photobook, "Fourteen" (1995). She would go on to shoot several other successful photobooks such as "Edge" (1996), "Marugoto Kanako" (1997), "Michi" ("Road") (1998), "Koko, Soko, Asoko" ("Here, There, Over There") (1999) and "Meirai" ("Beautiful Woman") (2002). Throughout this time she appeared on the covers of magazines and shot videos that complemented her photobook projects.

In time, Enomoto began to distinguish herself from the "Visual Queen" field by embarking on an acting career. "Little sister" roles gave way to action and comedy, and then to mature roles. She won a "Best Supporting Actress" award for her portrayal of a mentally challenged young woman in the drama series "Flowers for Algernon" (2002) and received reviews for her role in the feature-length art-house film "Inu-Neko" ("The Cat Leaves Home") which premiered in 2004. Enomoto has also worked as a radio host for the Fuji network, as a television presenter, and has made many guest appearances on television talk and variety shows.

== Personal life ==
Enomoto married baseball player Kazuhiro Sasaki on May 9, 2005. They have a son, born prematurely on 29 April 2005. She also lives with her husband's two children by his ex-wife. Enomoto's public activities stopped as she devoted herself to home life, although she did appear together with her husband on Dospe on 17 June 2006. In June 2006, she gave birth to her second child.

Throughout her life, Enomoto has practiced music and dancing, and she enjoys cooking. She published a cookbook of her favourite recipes in 2003. She also released a CD of her singing in 2002.

== Filmography ==
=== Television ===
Here is a (partial) list of dramas Enomoto has appeared in:

1. Kyanpasu nooto (Campus Notes) (1996)
2. Iguana no musume (The Iguana's Daughter) (1996)
3. Osorubeshi! Otonashi Karen-san (How horrible! Karen the obedient) (1998)
4. P. A. (puraibeeto akutoresu) (Private Actress, a.k.a. The Stand-In) (1998)
5. Kawaii dake ja dame kashira? (Isn't Being Cute Enough?) (1999)
6. Virtual Girl (2000)
7. Tadaima manshitsu (No Vacancy at Present) (2000)
8. Shoushimin keen (Petty Bourgeois Kane) (2000)
9. Fuudofaito supesharu (Foodfight Special) (2001)
10. Golden Bowl (2002)
11. Aruganon ni Hanataba wo (Flowers For Algernon) (2002)
12. Niji no kanata (Over The Rainbow) (2004)

=== Movies ===
1. Yurika-chan (1995)
2. Tokimeki Memorial (1997)
3. Inuneko (The Cat Leaves Home) (2004)
