= Robō no Fujii =

Japanese manga series

- First tankōbon volume cover

路傍のフジイ
- Genre: Drama
- Manga
- Written by: Kurao Nabe
- Published by: Shogakukan
- Magazine: Weekly Big Comic Spirits
- Original run: May 15, 2023 – August 17, 2026
- Volumes: 7
- icon

Robō no Fujii (路傍のフジイ; lit. 'Passerby Fujii') is a Japanese manga series written and illustrated by Kurao Nabe. It was serialized in Shogakukan's seinen manga magazine Weekly Big Comic Spirits from May 2023 to August 2026.

== Plot ==
Tanaka is an office worker who is single and likes to compare himself to others since he feels anxious about his future. He eventually notices Fujii, a colleague who is 40-years-old, single, and has a dull appearance. Tanaka initially thinks that he is better than Fujii, but after getting to know him, he begins to realize that there may be more to him than his dull appearance.

== Publication ==
Written and illustrated by Kurao Nabe, Robō no Fujii was serialized in Shogakukan's seinen manga magazine Weekly Big Comic Spirits from May 15, 2023, to August 17, 2026. Shogakukan has collected its chapters into individual tankōbon volumes, with the first one released on October 30, 2023. As of September 30, 2026, seven volumes have been released.

=== Volumes ===
No.	Japanese release date	Japanese ISBN
1	October 30, 2023	978-4-09-862542-0
2	February 29, 2024	978-4-09-862708-0
3	August 30, 2024	978-4-09-863020-2
4	February 28, 2025	978-4-09-863203-9
5	August 29, 2025	978-4-09-863585-6
6	February 27, 2026	978-4-09-863781-2
7	September 30, 2026	978-4-09-864027-0

== Reception ==
The series ranked 17th in the print category at the tenth Next Manga Awards in 2024. It ranked eleventh on the 2024 "Book of the Year" list by Da Vinci magazine; it ranked eighth on the 2025 list. It ranked fifth on Takarajimasha's Kono Manga ga Sugoi! list of best manga of 2025 for male readers. It was ranked second in the 18th Manga Taishō in 2025; it ranked seventh in the 19th edition in 2026.
