= Miharu no Senjō =

Japanese manga series

- First tankōbon volume cover

ミハルの戦場
- Genre: Action
- Manga
- Written by: Gouten Hamada
- Illustrated by: Kenshi Fujimoto
- Published by: Shogakukan
- Imprint: Manga One Comics
- Magazine: MangaONE
- Original run: January 4, 2025 – present
- Volumes: 4

Miharu no Senjō (ミハルの戦場; "Miharu's Battlefield") is a Japanese manga series written by Gouten Hamada and illustrated by Kenshi Fujimoto. It began serialization on Shogakukan's MangaONE manga service in January 2025.

== Synopsis ==
The series is set in a Japan that is divided and ravaged by World War III. Miharu, a girl who is a skilled sniper, meets Shou, an ex-sniper who cannot bring it upon himself to shoot people anymore, and together they team up in a war that could determine Japan's future.

== Publication ==
Written by Gouten Hamada and illustrated by Kenshi Fujimoto, Miharu no Senjō began serialization on Shogakukan's MangaONE manga service on January 4, 2025. Its chapters have been compiled into four tankōbon volumes as of May 2026.

No.	Release date	ISBN
1	May 19, 2025	978-4-09-854087-7
2	September 11, 2025	978-4-09-854248-2
3	December 19, 2025	978-4-09-854351-9
4	May 12, 2026	978-4-09-854522-3

== Reception ==
The third volume featured a recommendation from video game creator Hideo Kojima.

Miharu no Senjō was ranked tenth in Da Vinci's 2025 Book of the Year ranking. The series was ranked seventh in the 2026 edition of Takarajimasha's Kono Manga ga Sugoi! guidebook's list of best manga for male readers. It is currently nominated for the 10th Saito Takao Award.
