= RIOT (manga) =

Japanese manga series

- First tankōbon volume cover
- Genre: Coming-of-age
- Manga
- Written by: Yūta Tsukada
- Published by: Shogakukan
- Imprint: Big Comics
- Magazine: Monthly Big Comic Spirits
- Original run: May 27, 2024 – present
- Volumes: 5

RIOT is a Japanese manga series written and illustrated by Yūta Tsukada. It began serialization in Shogakukan's seinen manga magazine Monthly Big Comic Spirits in May 2024.

== Synopsis ==
The series is centered around two boys named Shanghai and Aiji. The duo live in a rural town where there are no bookstores or record stores, however they are attached to paper magazines and are inspired to launch one of their own.

== Publication ==
Written and illustrated by Yūta Tsukada, RIOT began serialization in Shogakukan's seinen manga magazine Monthly Big Comic Spirits on May 27, 2024. Its chapters have been compiled into five tankōbon volumes as of September 2026.

No.	Release date	ISBN
1	November 28, 2024	978-4-09-863099-8
2	April 30, 2025	978-4-09-863410-1
3	October 30, 2025	978-4-09-863619-8
4	April 30, 2026	978-4-09-863886-4
5	September 30, 2026	978-4-09-864112-3

== Reception ==
The series was ranked third in Da Vinci's 2025 Book of the Year ranking. The series, alongside Nba!, was ranked fourteenth in the 2026 edition of Takarajimasha's Kono Manga ga Sugoi! guidebook's list of best manga for male readers. The series was nominated for the 19th Manga Taishō in 2026, and was ranked ninth.
