= Nagi no Oitoma =

Japanese manga series

- First tankōbon volume cover, featuring Nagi Ōshima

凪のお暇
- Genre: Romantic comedy
- Manga
- Written by: Misato Konari
- Published by: Akita Shoten
- Imprint: A.L.C・DX
- Magazine: Elegance Eve
- Original run: June 25, 2016 – February 26, 2025
- Volumes: 12
- Television drama
- Directed by: Toshio Tsuboi; Takeyoshi Yamamoto; Nobuhiro Doi; Maiko Ōuchi
- Produced by: Yoshihiko Nakai
- Written by: Satomi Ōshima
- Music by: Pascals
- Original network: TBS
- Original run: July 19, 2019 – September 20, 2019
- Episodes: 10
- icon

Nagi no Oitoma (Japanese: 凪のお暇; "Nagi's Long Vacation") is a Japanese manga series written and illustrated by Misato Konari. It was serialized in Akita Shoten's josei manga magazine Elegance Eve from June 2016 to February 2025, with its chapters collected into twelve tankōbon volumes. A television drama adaptation aired from July to September 2019.

By May 2023, Nagi no Oitoma had over 5 million copies in circulation. In 2019, the manga won the Excellence Award at the 22nd Japan Media Arts Festival. In 2020, it won the 65th Shogakukan Manga Award in the shōjo category.

== Plot ==
Nagi Ōshima, a 28-year-old employee, has always made sure not to be noticed, not to make waves and to agree with everyone. Because of this, her colleagues tend to take advantage of her. One day, she finally breaks down and drops everything. After that, Nagi quit her company, disposed of her household goods, moved from the city center to the suburbs, cut off all relationships with everyone, and started her new life from scratch.

== Media ==
=== Manga ===
Written and illustrated by Misato Konari, Nagi no Oitoma was serialized in Akita Shoten's josei manga magazine Elegance Eve from June 25, 2016, to February 26, 2025. Twelve tankōbon volumes were released from June 2017 to June 2025.

A spin-off series under the same title was serialized in the Champion Tap! website from January 26, 2017, to April 12, 2018.

==== Volumes ====
No.	Japanese release date	Japanese ISBN
1	June 16, 2017	978-4-253-15637-0
2	November 16, 2017	978-4-253-15638-7
3	January 16, 2018	978-4-253-15640-0
4	July 13, 2018	978-4-253-15641-7
5	February 15, 2019	978-4-253-15644-8
6	September 13, 2019	978-4-253-15646-2
7	April 16, 2020	978-4-253-15649-3
8	January 15, 2021	978-4-253-15650-9
9	December 16, 2021	978-4-253-15654-7
10	August 16, 2022	978-4-253-15682-0
11	February 16, 2024	978-4-253-15687-5
12	June 16, 2025	978-4-253-15712-4

=== Drama ===
In May 2019, a television drama adaptation was announced, starring Haru Kuroki as Nagi Ōshima. It was directed by Toshio Tsuboi, Takeyoshi Yamamoto, Nobuhiro Doi, and Maiko Ōuchi, based on a screenplay written by Satomi Ōshima. Yoshihiko Nakai served as the producer, while Pascals composed the music. The ten-episode series aired on TBS from July 19 to September 20, 2019. Miwa performed the theme song "Reboot" (リブート).

== Reception ==
=== Manga ===
By October 2018, the manga had over 1.5 million copies in circulation; it had over 2 million copies in circulation by May 2019; over 3 million copies in circulation by September 2019; over 4 million copies in circulation by January 2021; and over 5 million copies in circulation by May 2023.

Nagi no Oitoma was nominated for the 11th Manga Taishō in 2018 and ranked 3rd out of twelve nominees with 56 points; it ranked 10th out of thirteen nominees in the 12th edition with 25 points. The series placed 3rd in the 2019 edition of Takarajimasha's Kono Manga ga Sugoi! list of best manga for female readers; it ranked 11th in the 2020 edition; and 6th in the 2026 edition. In 2019, the series was nominated for the 23rd Tezuka Osamu Cultural Prize. In the same year, it won the Excellence Award in the Manga Division at the 22nd Japan Media Arts Festival. The series also ranked 9th in Da Vinci magazine's "Book of the Year" list for 2019; it ranked 20th in the 2025 list. It was nominated for the 43rd Kodansha Manga Award in the shōjo category. In 2020, Nagi no Oitoma won the 65th Shogakukan Manga Award in the shōjo category.

=== Drama ===
The drama adaptation won the Best Picture Award at the 102nd Television Drama Academy Awards and the 17th Confidence Award Drama Prize in 2019. It won the Excellent Award at the 2020 International Drama Festival in Tokyo.
