= Mizu wa Umi ni Mukatte Nagareru =

Japanese manga series

- First tankōbon volume cover

水は海に向かって流れる
- Manga
- Written by: Rettō Tajima
- Published by: Kodansha
- Magazine: Bessatsu Shōnen Magazine
- Original run: August 9, 2018 – July 9, 2020
- Volumes: 3
- Live-action film
- Directed by: Tetsu Maeda
- Written by: Satomi Oshima
- Music by: Takeshi Haketa
- Studio: st'blue
- Released: June 9, 2023
- Runtime: 123 minutes

Mizu wa Umi ni Mukatte Nagareru (水は海に向かって流れる; "Water Flows Toward the Sea") is a Japanese manga series written and illustrated by Rettō Tajima. It was serialized in Kodansha's shōnen manga magazine Bessatsu Shōnen Magazine from August 2018 to July 2020, with its chapters collected in three tankōbon volumes. A live-action film adaptation premiered in June 2023.

== Media ==
=== Manga ===
Written and illustrated by Rettō Tajima, Mizu wa Umi ni Mukatte Nagareru was serialized in Kodansha's shōnen manga magazine Bessatsu Shōnen Magazine from August 9, 2018, to July 9, 2020. Kodansha collected its chapters in three tankōbon volumes, released from May 9, 2019, to September 9, 2020.

==== Volumes ====
No.	Release date	ISBN
1	May 9, 2019	978-4-06-514451-0
2	December 9, 2019	978-4-06-517908-6
3	September 9, 2020	978-4-06-520587-7

=== Live-action film ===
In November 2022, it was announced that the manga would receive a live-action film adaptation. It is directed by Tetsu Maeda with scripts written by Satomi Oshima, and stars Suzu Hirose as Chisa Sasaki. It premiered on June 9, 2023.

== Reception ==
The manga ranked 18th on the 2020 "Book of the Year" list by Da Vinci magazine. On Takarajimasha's Kono Manga ga Sugoi! ranking of top 20 manga for male readers, the series ranked fifth on the 2019 list, and fourth on the 2020 list. The manga was nominated for the 13th and 14th Manga Taishō in 2020 and 2021, respectively. It won the 24th Tezuka Osamu Cultural Prize's New Creator Prize in 2020.
