= Before You Go Extinct =

Japanese manga anthology series

- Cover of the volume

きみの絶滅する前に (Kimi ni Zetsumetsu suru Mae ni)
- Genre: Dark comedy
- Manga
- Written by: Takashi Ushiroyato
- Illustrated by: Kanato Abiko
- Published by: Kodansha
- English publisher: NA: Kodansha USA
- Imprint: Morning KC
- Magazine: Comic Days
- Original run: May 3, 2024 – May 31, 2024
- Volumes: 1

Before You Go Extinct (Japanese: きみの絶滅する前に, Hepburn: Kimi ni Zetsumetsu suru Mae ni) is a Japanese anthology manga series written by Takashi Ushiroyato and illustrated by Kanato Abiko. It was serialized on Kodansha's Comic Days website in May 2024.

== Plot ==
Each chapter centers on different creatures (such as penguins, otters, and crows) as they navigate their extinction, blending absurd humor with existential themes. A recurring narrative thread follows two transmigrating souls who inhabit multiple animal forms across the stories, encountering one another in shifting roles and relationships that illuminate connections between play, love, and purpose. A humble rock appears throughout the volume as a symbolic object tied to these reflections.

== Publication ==
Written by Takashi Ushiroyato and illustrated by Kanato Abiko, Before You Go Extinct was serialized on Kodansha's Comic Days website between May 3 and 31, 2024. Its chapters were compiled into a single tankōbon volume released on August 9, 2024.

During their panel at New York Comic Con 2024, Kodansha USA announced that they had licensed the series for English publication in Q4 2025.

| No. | Original release date | Original ISBN | North American release date | North American ISBN |
|---|---|---|---|---|
| 1 | August 9, 2024 | 978-4-06-536601-1 | October 7, 2025 | 978-1-64-729474-8 |
1. "The Penguin Who Cried Love at the Center of the World"; 2. "On Becoming a Crow"; 3. "How a Sea Otter Cracks a Shell"; 4. "The Juggling River Otter"; 5. "Swan Song Kākāpō"; 6. "Warming the Stone with Love"

== Reception ==
The series was nominated for the 8th Saito Takao Award in 2025.

The series, alongside Sahashi-kun no Ayakashi Biyori, Superstar o Utatte, and Leteitenite, was ranked seventeenth in the 2025 edition of Takarajimasha's Kono Manga ga Sugoi! guidebook of the best manga for male readers.

The series was included in the American Library Association's 2025 Best Graphic Novels for Adults.
