= List of Space Brothers chapters =

The chapters of the Japanese manga series Space Brothers are written and illustrated by Chūya Koyama. It was serialized in Kodansha's seinen manga magazine Morning from December 2007 to June 2026. Its 432 chapters were compiled in 46 tankōbon volumes, released between March 2008 and July 2026. It is licensed for English release by Kodansha USA, with the first volume releasing in November 2015. The 45th and latest volume released in December 2025.

== Volume list ==
No.	Original release date	Original ISBN	English release date	English ISBN
1	March 21, 2008	978-4-06-372674-9	November 3, 2015	978-1-68233-038-8
#1 "Little Brother Hibito and Big Brother Mutta" (弟ヒビトと兄ムッタ, Otōto Hibito to Ani Mutta); #2 "My Golden Sheen" (俺の金ピカ, Ore no Kin Pika); #3 "Life Hanging on a Loose Screw" (ネジ一個だよ人生は, Neji Ikko Da yo Jinsei wa); #4 "The Man with the Advantage" (一番有利な男, Ichiban Yūri na Otoko); #5 "Serika's Memories" (せりかの日記, Serika no Nikki); #6 "Next to Hibito" (日々人の隣, Hibito no Tonari); #7 "Hibito Namba's Older Brother-Chan" (南波日々人のお兄ちゃん, Nanba Hibito no O Nii Chan); #8 "Reunion" (再会, Saikai)
2	June 23, 2008	978-4-06-372711-1	November 3, 2015	978-1-68233-039-5
#9 "Something Missing" (足りない日々, Tarinai Hibi); #10 "Samurai and Peanuts" (侍&ピーナッツ, Samurai ando Pīnattsu); #11 "Etcetera Going Round in My Head" (頭にまつわるエトセトラ, Atama ni Matsuwaru Eto Setora); #12 "Rolling Rolling Mutta" (コロコロムッタ, Koro Koro Mutta); #13 "Dear Hibito" (拝啓日々人, Haikei Hibito); #14 "A Heaven of White Smoke" (白煙天国, Hakuen Tengoku); #15 "Everything's OK" (万事OK, Banji Ōkē); #16 "Gripping the Text" (握りしメール, Nigirishi Mēru); #17 "Being Prepared in Various Ways" (それぞれの覚悟, Sorezore no Kakugo); #18 "Hope on the ISS" (希望はISSにあり, Kibō wa Ai Esu Esu ni Ari)
3	September 22, 2008	978-4-06-372732-6	November 10, 2015	978-1-68233-040-1
#19 "Begin" (スタート, Sutāto); #20 "Wheels on the Bus Go Round and Round" (バスバス走る, Basu Basu Hashiru); #21 "The Final Room" (最後の部屋, Saigo no Heya); #22 "Isolation Box" (閉鎖ボックス, Heisa Bokkusu); #23 "Made-Up Time" (でっちあげタイム, Detchiage Taimu); #24 "My Name Is Serika Itou" (私の名前は伊東せりかです。, Watashi no Namae wa Itō Serika Desu.); #25 "Black Band" (黒いバンド, Kuroi Bando); #26 "Three Dimensional Ants" (3次元アリ, San Jigen Ari); #27 "Fukuda's Dream" (福田の夢, Fukuda no Yume); #28 "Ya-Ssan" (やっさん, Ya' San)
4	December 22, 2008	978-4-06-372763-0	November 17, 2015	978-1-68233-041-8
#29 "Beep Beep Beep" (ピピピ, Pi Pi Pi); #30 "Let's Talk About Space" (宇宙の話をしよう, Uchū no Hanashi o Shiyō); #31 "Mystery A and Mystery B" (謎Aと謎B, Nazo Ē to Nazo Bī); #32 "An Alarm and No Clock" (アラームアリ時計ナシ, Arāmu Ari Tokei Nashi); #33 "Green Card" (グリーンカード, Gurīn Kādo); #34 "Take a Hand in Hand" (手に手を, Te ni Te o); #35 "Screwed Up" (ねじれ者, Nejiremono); #36 "Oobe, Kenji!" (かぺ! けんじ!, Kape! Kenji!); #37 "The Day Before Farewell" (さらばの前の日, Saraba no Mae no Hi); #38 "The Cruelest Test" (一番酷い仕打ち, Ichiban Hidoi Shiuchi)
5	March 23, 2009	978-4-06-372782-1	November 24, 2015	978-1-68233-042-5
#39 "Rock and Scissors and Paper" (グーとチョキとパー, Gū to Choki to Pā); #40 "The Long Unseen Sky" (久しぶりの空, Hisashiburi no Sora); #41 "The Smallest Spaceship" (最小の宇宙船, Saishō no Uchūsen); #42 "Only One Left" (あと1人, Ato Hitori); #43 "In Mid-Dream" (夢の途中, Yume no Tochū); #44 "Father and Son and Mutta Claus" (親父と息子とムッタクロース, Oyaji to Musuko to Mutta Kurōsu); #45 "The Day of Another Departure" (再出発の日, Saishuppatsu no Hi); #46 "Grass Cutting Man & Sand Spraying Man" (芝刈り男と砂掛け男, Shibakari Otoko to Sunakake Otoko); #47 "Azuma" (吾妻, Azuma); #48 "Mach Speed Brother" (マッハの弟, Mahha no Otōto)
6	June 23, 2009	978-4-06-372802-6	December 1, 2015	978-1-68233-064-7
#49 "Training Big Brother" (筋トレ兄, Kin Tore Ani); #50 "An Interview with Pain" (痛みを伴う面接, Itami o Tomonau Mensetsu); #51 "Today, or to Be Exact, Now" (今日、ちょうど今, Kyō, Chōdo Ima); #52 "One Question" (一つの質問, Hitotsu no Shitsumon); #53 "The Crew Has Arrived!" (クルー参上!, Kurū Sanjō!); #54 "The Miracle of Doha" (ドーハのきせき, Dōha no Kiseki); #55 "The Night Before Liftoff" (打ち上げ前夜, Uchiage Zen'ya); #56 "50:50" (5:5, Go Tai Go); #57 "The Dog, the Old Man and Alexander" (犬とじじいとアレクサンダー, Inu to Jijii to Arekusandā); #58 "A Quiet Place" (静かな場所, Shizuka na Basho)
7	September 23, 2009	978-4-06-372832-3	December 8, 2015	978-1-68233-065-4
#59 "Liftoff" (リフトオフ, Rifutoofu); #60 "Rocket Road" (ロケットロード, Roketto Rōdo); #61 "Control Gramps" (コントロールおじいちゃん, Kontorōru O Jii Chan); #62 "Off-Limits" (入ってはいけない場所, Haitte wa Ikenai Basho); #63 "The First Step" (最初の一歩, Saisho no Ippo); #64 "What I Wanted to Know" (知りたかったこと, Shiritakatta Koto); #65 "Moon Rabbit" (月のウサギ, Tsuki no Usagi); #66 "A Pug and a Hug on a Moonlit Night" (月夜の晩にパグとハグ, Tsukiyo no Ban ni Pagu to Hagu); #67 "Lucky 6" (ラッキー6, Rakkī Shikkusu); #68 "From a Small Corner of a Vast Facility" (だだっ広い施設の ほんの一角から, Dadappiroi Shisetsu no Hon no Ikkaku kara)
8	December 22, 2009	978-4-06-372858-3	December 15, 2015	978-1-68233-066-1
#69 "The Dancing Astronaut" (踊る宇宙飛行士, Odoru Uchū Hikōshi); #70 "Top of the Class" (トップの男, Toppu no Otoko); #71 "Two Men in the Park" (公園におっさん2人, Kōen ni Ossan Futari); #72 "New Members" (新メンバー, Shin Menbā); #73 "The Eleventh Text" (11件目のメール, Jū Ikken Me no Mēru); #74 "The Kanji for "Person"" (「人」という字は......, "Hito" to Iu Ji wa......); #75 "Lunar Illusions" (月の錯覚, Tsuki no Sakkaku); #76 "Heaven and Hell" (天国で地獄, Tengoku de Jigoku); #77 "Flash" (閃光, Senkō); #78 "Determination" (二人の判断, Futari no Handan)
9	March 23, 2010	978-4-06-372883-5	December 22, 2015	978-1-68233-067-8
#79 "80 Minutes" (80分, Hachi Juppun); #80 "Entrusting It to Gibson" (ギブソンに託す, Gibuson ni Takusu); #81 "Hibito's Decision" (日々人の選択, Hibito no Sentaku); #82 "Taking a Walk on the Moon" (月面散歩, Getsumen Sanpo); #83 "Brothers" (兄弟, Kyōdai); #84 "Brian" (ブライアン, Buraian); #85 "Peace" (ピース, Pīsu); #86 "The Three Astronauts" (3人の宇宙飛行士, San Nin no Uchū Hikōshi); #87 "Sharon" (シャロン, Sharon); #88 "The Five Blue Rangers" (5人の青レンジャー, Go Nin no Ao Renjā)
10	June 23, 2010	978-4-06-372909-2	December 29, 2015	978-1-68233-068-5
#89 "Dinner Tables and New Journeys" (食卓と旅立ち, Shokutaku to Tabidachi); #90 "Sponsors" (訓練教官, Kunren Kyōkan); #91 "Stage Performers" (舞台役者, Butai Yakusha); #92 "First Promise" (最初の約束, Saisho no Yakusoku); #93 "Training Begins" (訓練開始, Kunren Kaishi); #94 "I Keep an Internal Pedometer" (心にいつも万歩計を, Kokoro ni Itsumo Manpokei o); #95 "The Purpose of Training" (訓練の意図, Kunren no Ito); #96 "Leader Nitta" (リーダー新田, Rīdā Nitta); #97 "Nitta & Mutta" (ニッタとムッタ, Nitta to Mutta); #98 "Little Brother" (弟, Otōto); #99 "Two Big Brothers" (二人の兄, Futari no Ani)
11	September 22, 2010	978-4-06-372939-9; 978-4-06-362174-7 (limited edition)	January 5, 2016	978-1-68233-069-2
#100 "Living Rocks" (生きた石コロ, Ikita Ishikoro); #101 "To the Goal" (ゴールまで, Gōru made); #102 "Leftovers" (残りモノ, Nokorimono); #103 "Pico" (ピコ, Piko); #104 "Promise to Drink" (酒の約束, Sake no Yakusoku); #105 "The Engineer's Switch" (技術者のスイッチ, Gijutsusha no Suitchi); #106 "From "Par" to "Te"" (「パ」から「ト」, "Pa" kara "To"); #107 "An Earnest Failure" (本気の失敗, Honki no Shippai); #108 "Rocket Hill" (ロケット杉のある丘, Roketto Sugi no Aru Oka); #109 "Oath Sign" (誓いのサイン, Chikai no Sain)
12	December 22, 2010	978-4-06-372961-0; 978-4-06-358341-0 (limited edition)	January 12, 2016	978-1-68233-070-8
#110 "Rendezvous" (ランデヴー, Randevū); #111 "Mini Space Development" (縮小版 宇宙開発, Shukushōban Uchū Kaihatsu); #112 "Sea Divers and Sky Divers" (海人と宇宙人, Uminchu to Uchunchu); #113 "Those Who Wait for Hibito" (日々人を待つ人々, Hibito o Matsu Hitobito); #114 "Each Return" (それぞれの帰還, Sorezore no Kikan); #115 "Premonition" (予感, Yokan); #116 "Those Who Dream of Faraway" (遥か遠くを望む人, Haruka Tōku o Nozomu Hito); #117 ""Lovely Reason"" (「素敵な理由」, "Suteki na Riyū"); #118 "Racing Heart of Youth" (若き日のドキドキ, Wakaki Hi no Doki Doki); #119 "Even So, She Kept Smiling" (それでも彼女は笑っていた, Soredemo Kanojo wa Waratteita)
13	March 23, 2011; March 18, 2011 (limited edition)	978-4-06-372981-8; 978-4-06-358345-8 (limited edition)	January 19, 2016	978-1-68233-071-5
#120 "A Piece of Cake" (一切れのケーキ, Hitokire no Kēki); #121 "Make-Up Test Collision" (追試追突, Tsuishi Tsuitotsu); #122 "Pilot in a Wheelchair" (車イスのパイロット, Kuruma Isu no Pairotto); #123 "Two Notepads" (二つのノート, Futatsu no Nōto); #124 "Written Letters" (手紙, Tegami); #125 "First-Rate Pilot" (一流のパイロット, Ichi Ryū no Pairotto); #126 "Deneilized" (デニール化, Denīru-ka); #127 "Two Keyboards" (二つの鍵盤, Futatsu no Kenban); #128 "Last Young" (ラストヤング, Rasuto Yangu); #129 "Next to Hibito" (日々人に並ぶ, Hibito ni Narabu)
14	June 23, 2011	978-4-06-387006-0; 978-4-06-358350-2 (limited edition)	January 26, 2016	978-1-68233-072-2
#130 "The Shortcut & the Long Way" (近道と遠回り, Chikamichi to Tōmawari); #131 "Resolve to Quit" (諦めのような覚悟, Akirame no Yō na Kakugo); #132 "Rehearsal" (リハーサル, Rihāsaru); #133 "Hibito's Disorder" (日々人の障害, Hibito no Shōgai); #134 "A Possible Solution" (解決案かもしれない, Kaiketsuan ka mo Shirenai); #135 "A Road on the Roadless Moon" (道なき月に道を, Michi Naki Tsuki ni Michi o); #136 "Vertical Climb Roll" (バーティカル クライム ロール, Bātikaru Kuraimu Rōru); #137 "Magic Trick" (魔法の裏技, Mahō no Urawaza); #138 "Alien Baltan" (バルタン星人, Barutan Seijin); #139 "My Two Hands" (わたしの両手, Watashi no Ryōte)
15	September 23, 2011	978-4-06-387038-1; 978-4-06-358360-1 (limited edition)	February 2, 2016	978-1-68233-073-9
#140 "Olga" (オリガ, Origa); #141 "A Hero" (英雄, Eiyū); #142 "Cloudy, with a Drink" (曇りのち酒, Kumori Nochi Sake); #143 "The Astronaut's Daughter" (宇宙飛行士の娘, Uchū Hikōshi no Musume); #144 "A Clear Patch" (晴れ間, Harema); #145 "Time's Up" (時間切れ, Jikangire); #146 "Cosmonaut" (コスモノート, Kosumonōto); #147 "Olga, Hibito, and Gagarin" (オリガとヒビトとガガーリン, Origa to Hibito to Gagārin); #148 "NEEMO" (NEEMO, Nīmo); #149 "Secret" (秘密, Himitsu)
16	December 22, 2011; December 20, 2011 (limited edition)	978-4-06-387065-7; 978-4-06-358373-1 (limited edition)	February 9, 2016	978-1-68233-074-6
#150 "Ants & Monsters" (アリとモンスター, Ari to Monsutā); #151 "NEEMO, Day One" (NEEMO初日, Nīmo Shonichi); #152 "Preparations" (予習, Yoshū); #153 "Space Family" (宇宙家族, Uchū Kazoku); #154 "Kenji and Me" (俺とケンジ, Ore to Kenji); #155 "Andy" (アンディ, Andi); #156 "Not Enough Time" (足りない時間, Tarinai Jikan); #157 "Super Panda Man" (スーパンダマン, Sūpandaman); #158 "The Fancy Pair" (奇遇な二人, Kigū na Futari); #159 "On the Moon" (月面にいた, Getsumen ni Ita)
17	March 23, 2012; March 21, 2012 (limited edition)	978-4-06-387090-9; 978-4-06-358381-6 (limited edition)	February 16, 2016	978-1-68233-075-3
#160 "Light" (明かり, Akari); #161 "For Tomorrow" (明日のために, Ashita no Tame ni); #162 "Eleven-Year-Old Olga, Twelve-Year-Old Olga" (11のオリガ 12のオリガ, Jū Ichi no Origa Jū Ni no Origa); #163 "To My Own Place" (自分の場所へ, Jibun no Basho e); #164 "Another Big Brother" (もう一人の兄貴, Mō Hitori no Aniki); #165 "Pretty Dog" (プリティ・ドッグ, Puriti Doggu); #166 "Same Seat" (同じシート, Onaji Shīto); #167 "Last Words" (最後の言葉, Saigo no Kotoba); #168 "A Tiny Note & a Huge Good Luck Charm" (小っちゃいメモとでっかいお守り, Chitchai Memo to Dekkai O Mamori); #169 "CO_{2} High" (CO_{2} HIGH, Shī Ō Tsū Hai)
18	June 22, 2012	978-4-06-387118-0; 978-4-06-362224-9 (limited edition)	February 23, 2016	978-1-68233-076-0
#170 "How to Save Hibito" (ヒビトの救い方, Hibito no Sukuikata); #171 "My Sides" (俺の横っ腹, Ore no Yokoppara); #172 "The CES-62 Backup Crew" (CES-62バックアップクルー, Sesu Roku Jū Ni Bakku Appu Kurū); #173 "The Lonely Ones" (孤独な彼ら, Kodoku na Karera); #174 "In the Back of Your Mind" (心の片隅に, Kokoro no Katasumi ni); #175 "Bloodstained Souls" (血みどろの魂, Chimidoro no Tamashii); #176 "Calm and Excitement" (安心と興奮, Anshin to Kōfun); #177 "Teamwork Is Fun" (ワクワクチームワーク, Waku Waku Chīmuwāku); #178 "Betty" (ベティ, Beti)
19	October 23, 2012	978-4-06-387149-4; 978-4-06-358400-4 (limited edition)	March 1, 2016	978-1-68233-077-7
#179 "Our Future" (俺らの将来, Orera no Shōrai); #180 "An Astronaut and a Dad" (宇宙飛行士であり父であり, Uchū Hikōshi de Ari Chichi de Ari); #181 "Birthday" (バースデー, Bāsudē); #182 "It's Still Here" (消えないんだ, Kienainda); #183 "Poison" (毒, Doku); #184 "Telepathy" (テレパシー, Terepashī); #185 "The Strongest Astronaut" (最強の宇宙飛行士, Saikyō no Uchū Hikōshi); #186 "Hibito-San" (日々人さん, Hibito San); #187 "A Man in a Pinch and the Family of Vince" (ピンチ男とビンス家, Pinchi Otoko to Binsu Ke)
20	February 22, 2013; February 20, 2013 (limited edition)	978-4-06-387169-2; 978-4-06-358427-1 (limited edition)	March 8, 2016	978-1-68233-078-4
#188 "Rick" (RICK, Rikku); #189 "Moon Worker" (MOON WORKER, Mūn Wākā); #190 "The "R" in Rick" (Rickの"R", Rikku no "Āru"); #191 "Before the Landing" (着陸の前に, Chakuriku no Mae ni); #192 "A Stinging Miracle" (ビリビリ奇跡, Biri Biri Kiseki); #193 "My Brightest Smile" (メイ イッパイノ 笑顔, Mei Ippaino Egao); #194 "Good News" (イイ知ラセ, Ii Shirase); #195 "Assignment" (アサイン, Asain); #196 "Please, Mr. Moon" (頼むぜお月さん, Tanomu ze O Tsuki San)
21	June 21, 2013	978-4-06-387223-1; 978-4-06-358456-1 (limited edition)	March 15, 2016	978-1-68233-079-1
#197 "It's Me" (俺です, Ore Desu); #198 "One Hundred Million Dollars" (1億ドル, Ichi Oku Doru); #199 "Salvation" (救い, Sukui); #200 "The Drawing Board" (白紙, Hakushi); #201 "Ending the ISS" (ISSを終わらせる, Ai Esu Esu o Owaraseru); #202 "A Way Out" (突破口, Toppakō); #203 "The Man Named Mutta Namba" (「南波六太」という人, "Nanba Mutta" to Iu Hito); #204 "Plan A" (第一案, Dai Ichi An); #205 "Prepared to Fail" (失敗覚悟で, Shippai Kakugo de)
22	October 23, 2013	978-4-06-387263-7; 978-4-06-358466-0 (limited edition)	March 22, 2016	978-1-68233-080-7
#206 "[5812]" (「5812」, "Go Sen Happyaku Jū Ni"); #207 "Output Tavern" (OUTPUT TAVERN, Autoputto Tavān); #208 "Parker and Walter" (パーカーとウォルター, Pākā to Worutā); #209 "Galaxy Spicy" (ギャラクシースパイシー, Gyarakushī Supaishī); #210 "The CES-66 Crew" (CES-66クルー, Sesu Roku Jū Roku Kurū); #211 "One Last Shot" (最後の足掻き, Saigo no Agaki); #212 "Those Who Bet" (賭ける人々, Kakeru Hitobito); #213 "Piece" (Piece, Pīsu); #214 "More than Anyone Else" (他の誰よりも, Hoka no Dare yori mo)
23	March 20, 2014	978-4-06-387294-1; 978-4-06-358700-5 (limited edition)	March 29, 2016	978-1-68233-081-4
#215 "Friends Forever" (友達。フォーエバー, Tomodachi. Fōebā); #216 "Countdown Poster" (秒読みポスター, Byōyomi Posutā); #217 "Good News, Good News, Good News, and Good News" (いいニュースといいニュースといいニュースといいニュース, Ii Nyūsu to Ii Nyūsu to Ii Nyūsu to Ii Nyūsu); #218 "Dear Serika" (せりかへ, Serika e); #219 "Hand-Wound Watch" (手巻きの時計, Temaki no Tokei); #220 "Mr. Earlobes and the Girl" (たぶさんと嬢ちゃん, Tabu San to Jō Chan); #221 "My Sister's Shining Hairpin and..." (かがやく姉のヘアピンと, Kagayaku Ane no Heapin to); #222 "The Door to Dreams" (夢のドア, Yume no Doa); #223 "If I Look into Their Eyes" (目を見れば, Me o Mireba)
24	September 22, 2014	978-4-06-388351-0; 978-4-06-358743-2 (limited edition)	April 5, 2016	978-1-68233-082-1
#224 "Let's Just Say That's It" (そういうことにしとこうぜ, Sō Iu Koto ni Shitokō ze); #225 "Liberio Gotti" (リベリオ・ゴッティ, Riberio Gotti); #226 "Gold" (ゴールド, Gōrudo); #227 "Key and Safe" (鍵と金庫, Kagi to Kinko); #228 "L.G." (L.G., Eru Jī); #229 "Perfect" (パーフェクト, Pāfekuto); #230 "Like Usual" (いつものように, Itsumo no Yō ni); #231 "Sha-San" (シャーさん, Shā San); #232 "Answer" (答え, Kotae)
25	February 23, 2015	978-4-06-388425-8; 978-4-06-358761-6 (limited edition)	September 6, 2016	978-1-68233-393-8
#233 "Namba Workshop" (南波工房, Nanba Kōbō); #234 "Call Him" (あいつを呼べ, Aitsu o Yobe); #235 "Nonno Babia" (ノンノ・バビア, Nonno Babia); #236 "Start Button" (スタートボタン, Sutāto Botan); #237 "What Hibito's Seen" (日々人の風景, Hibito no Fūkei); #238 "Co-Conspirators" (共犯グループ, Kyōhan Gurūpu); #239 "Let's Go to Space Together" (一緒に宇宙へ行こう, Issho ni Uchū e Ikō); #240 "Count 0" (カウント0, Kaunto Zero); #241 "Ascend!" (上がれ!, Agare!)
26	July 23, 2015	978-4-06-388475-3; 978-4-06-358778-4 (limited edition)	October 4, 2016	978-1-68233-394-5
#242 "Bakubaku" (バクバクだ。, Bakubaku Da.); #243 "Relaxing Rendezvous" (癒しのランデブー, Iyashi no Randebū); #244 "Mutta Weekly" (週刊六太, Shūkan Mutta); #245 "Emergency Call" (緊急連絡, Kinkyū Renraku); #246 "A New Me" (新しい私, Atarashii Watashi); #247 "Do You Read Me?" (聴こえますか, Kikoemasu ka); #248 "Moon Landing" (月面着陸, Getsumen Chakuriku); #249 "First Handprint" (最初の一手, Saisho no Itte); #250 "A Father's Long Word" (父の長い一言, Chichi no Nagai Hitokoto)
27	November 20, 2015	978-4-06-388523-1; 978-4-06-358780-7 (limited edition)	December 6, 2016	978-1-68233-410-2
#251 "Rumors of Serika" (せりかの噂, Serika no Uwasa); #252 "Japanese" (日本人, Nihonjin); #253 "Key and Keyhole" (鍵と鍵穴, Kagi to Kagiana); #254 "I'm the Only One!" (私しかいない!, Watashi shika Inai!); #255 "Thinking of Serika" (せりかを想う, Serika o Omou); #256 "The Person Who Doesn't Cry" (泣かない人, Nakanai Hito); #257 "The Words Spoken" (発する言葉, Hassuru Kotoba); #258 "My Job" (使命, Shimei); #259 "A Droplet Inside Hope" (きぼうに水滴, Kibō ni Suiteki)
28	April 22, 2016	978-4-06-388592-7; 978-4-06-362326-0 (limited edition)	December 27, 2016	978-1-68233-411-9
#260 "Light" (光, Hikari); #261 "Just You Wait, Sharon." (待ってろよシャロン, Mattero yo Sharon); #262 "Dark Side" (裏側, Uragawa); #263 "Not Part of the Plan" (想定外, Sōteigai); #264 "Hole" (穴, Ana); #265 "Loss and Discovery" (消失と発見, Shōshitsu to Hakken); #266 "Space Underground" (地中の宇宙, Chichū no Uchū); #267 "The Day I Realized" (気付いた一日, Kizuita Ichinichi); #268 "The Sound of the Rain" (雨の音, Ame no Oto)
29	September 23, 2016	978-4-06-388638-2; 978-4-06-358819-4 (limited edition)	August 29, 2017	978-1-68233-813-1
#269 "Big Wave" (大波, Ōnami); #270 "Present" (贈り物, Okurimono); #271 "That's Why I Came" (このために来た, Kono Tame ni Kita); #272 "The Tracks of Hope" (希望の轍, Kibō no Wadachi); #273 "It's My Fault" (俺のせいだ, Ore no Sei Da); #274 "Vallis Rittendinger" (リッテンディンガー峡谷, Rittendingā Kyōkoku); #275 "The Chosen Astronauts" (選ばれし宇宙飛行士, Erabareshi Asutoronōtsu); #276 "I Wish You Could See It" (お前に見せてやりたいぜ, Omae ni Miseteyaritai ze); #277 "Believe in Eddie" (エディを信じて, Edi o Shinjite); #0 Yūki no Pōzu (勇気のポーズ) (Note: Included in the booklet of the limited edition.)
30	January 23, 2017	978-4-06-388680-1; 978-4-06-397023-4 (limited edition)	November 21, 2017	978-1-68233-962-6
#278 "Let's Do the Rest" (続きをやろうぜ, Tsuzuki o Yarō ze); #279 "Eddie and Brian" (エディ&ブライアン, Edi ando Buraian); #280 "In Those Missing Moments" (空白の時間に, Kūhaku no Jikan ni); #281 "Don't Say Anything, Just Be There for Them" (語らずともそこにいてくれればいい, Katarazutomo Soko ni Itekurereba Ii); #282 "It's Been a While, Mu-Cchan" (久しぶりムッちゃん, Hisashiburi Mu' Chan); #283 "A Weird Thing to Say" (変な一言, Hen na Hitokoto); #284 "Farewell" (決別, Ketsubetsu); #285 "Confession" (告白, Kokuhaku); #286 "Russia's Warmth" (ロシアの温度, Roshia no Ondo)
31	June 23, 2017	978-4-06-388734-1; 978-4-06-397039-5 (limited edition)	January 2, 2018	978-1-64212-071-4
#287 "Leap into Russia" (ロシアに飛び込め, Roshia ni Tobikome); #288 "In Your Fist" (拳の中に, Kobushi no Naka ni); #289 "Answers" (答え合わせ, Kotaeawase); #290 "All According to Plan" (予定通りだ, Yotei Dōri Da); #291 "The Sun's Fault" (太陽のせい, Taiyō no Sei); #292 "Aurora Knight [sic]" (オーロラの夜, Ōrora no Yoru); #293 "Lunar Aurora" (月のオーロラ, Tsuki no Ōrora); #294 "Dark Unease" (暗い不安, Kurai Fuan); #295 "We Are Lonely..." (We are lonely..., Wī Ā Ronrī...)
32	November 22, 2017	978-4-06-510508-5; 978-4-06-397044-9 (limited edition)	August 7, 2018	978-1-64212-396-8
#296 "Work" (仕事だ, Shigoto Da); #297 "Because of the Stage or Because of the Costumes?" (舞台のせいか衣装のせいか, Butai no Sei ka Ishō no Sei ka); #298 "Japan's Day" (日本の日, Nihon no Hi); #299 "For Some Reason, It's Always Hibito" (なぜかいつも日々人だけど, Nazeka Itsumo Hibito Dakedo); #300 "Celebratory Fireworks" (祝福の火花, Shukufuku no Hibana); #301 "The Wind Is Blowing" (風が吹いてる, Kaze ga Fuiteru); #302 "For That Instant..." (その瞬間のために..., Sono Shunkan no Tame ni...); #303 "The World's Biggest Astronaut" (世界一大きい宇宙飛行士, Sekai Ichi Ōkii Uchū Hikōshi); #304 "Trouble Bill" (トラブルビル, Toraburu Biru)
33	April 23, 2018	978-4-06-511349-3; 978-4-06-511494-0 (limited edition)	December 18, 2018	978-1-64212-604-4
#305 "I Like That Peace" (そんな平和の中がいい, Sonna Heiwa no Naka ga Ii); #306 "Connection" (接続, Setsuzoku); #307 "Last Concert in Hell" (地獄のラストステージ, Jigoku no Rasuto Sutēji); #308 "No. 3" (NO.3, Nanbā Surī); #309 "Explosion" (破裂, Haretsu); #310 "Exam" (診断, Shindan); #311 "Pneumothorax" (気胸, Kikyō); #312 "The Strongest Will" (意志の強さ, Ishi no Tsuyosa); #313 "A Promise" (約束を, Yakusoku o)
34	October 23, 2018	978-4-06-513052-0; 978-4-06-512349-2 (limited edition)	January 21, 2020	978-1-64659-210-4
#314 "When You Get There" (進んだ先で, Susunda Saki de); #315 "More Blood" (血が増えている, Chi ga Fueteiru); #316 "Shine for Me" (光ってくれよ, Hikattekure yo); #317 "A Kind Lie" (優しい噓, Yasashii Uso); #318 "It's Not like You Can See the Sky" (空が見えるわけでもないのに, Sora ga Mieru Wake demo Nai noni); #319 "Cure Her Together" (二人で治す, Futari de Naosu); #320 "Like Diving" (潜るように, Moguru Yō ni); #321 "Chris's Mom" (クリスの母親, Kurisu no Hahaoya); #322 "Pulse" (脈動, Myakudō)
35	March 22, 2019	978-4-06-514749-8; 978-4-06-515327-7 (limited edition)	March 31, 2020	978-1-64659-274-6
#323 "From the Moon to the Earth" (From the Moon To the Earth, Furomu za Mūn tu ji Āsu); #324 "Performer" (パフォーマー, Pafōmā); #325 "Manned Mission" (有人ミッション, Yūjin Misshon); #326 "Calmly" (淡々と, Tantan to); #327 "Talking to Myself" (自分への言葉, Jibun e no Kotoba); #328 "Happy Ending" (ハッピーエンド, Happī Endo); #329 "As Promised" (約束通り, Yakusoku Dōri); #330 "A New Promise" (新たな約束, Arata na Yakusoku); #331 "Russia's Decision" (ロシアの決断, Roshia no Ketsudan)
36	August 23, 2019	978-4-06-516896-7; 978-4-06-516898-1 (limited edition)	May 19, 2020	978-1-64659-363-7
#332 "Golden Trio" (黄金トリオ, Ōgon Torio); #333 "King Piece" (キングの駒, Kingu no Koma); #334 "These Four" (この4人, Kono Yonin); #335 "Inside the Pocket" (内ポケットの, Uchi Poketto no); #336 "Before You Go to the Moon" (月に行っちゃう前に, Tsuki ni Itchau Mae ni); #337 "Hibito's Days" (日々人の日々, Hibito no Hibi); #338 "This Time It's Me" (願いを腕に 証を胸に, Negai o Ude ni Akashi o Mune ni); #339 "Lunar Lander" (ルナランダー, Runa Randā); #340 "De Gerlache Crater" (デ・ヘルラテクレーター, De Herurate Kurētā)
37	February 21, 2020	978-4-06-518431-8; 978-4-06-518433-2 (special edition)	August 18, 2020	978-1-64659-662-1
#341 "Monitor of Salvation" (救いのモニター, Sukui no Monitā); #342 "That Tiny Sound" (小さな音で, Chiisa na Oto de); #343 "Summer Brothers" (あの夏の兄弟, Ano Natsu no Kyōdai); #344 "5 Millimeter Job" (5ミリの仕事, Go Miri no Shigoto); #345 "To Go Home" (帰るために, Kaeru Tame ni); #346 "Before the Return" (帰還前, Kikan Mae); #347 "Splashdown" (着水, Chakusui); #348 "Hot Commencement" (激しい卒業式, Hageshii Sotsugyōshiki); #349 "Tiger Team" (タイガーチーム, Taigā Chīmu)
38	August 20, 2020	978-4-06-520366-8; 978-4-06-520371-2 (special edition)	December 8, 2020	978-1-64659-857-1
#350 "Start by Knowing" (知ることから, Shiru Koto kara); #351 "The Same Fear" (同じ恐怖, Onaji Kyōfu); #352 "Kenji & Reiji" (ケンジ&レイジ, Kenji ando Reiji); #353 "Like We Always Face Them" (いつもの顔で, Itsumo no Kao de); #354 "The Route of My Friends" (友の道, Tomo no Michi); #355 "Smile" (Smile, Sumairu); #356 "Lifeline" (命綱, Inochizuna); #357 "The Fake Person" (フェイクの人, Feiku no Hito); #358 "National Aeronautics and Surprise Administration, NASA" (National Aeronautics and Surprise Administration,NASA, Nashonaru Earonōtikusu ando Sapuraizu Adominisutorēshon Nasa)
39	February 22, 2021	978-4-06-522346-8; 978-4-06-522345-1 (special edition)	October 12, 2021	978-1-63699-411-6
#359 "First Fringe" (ファーストフリンジ, Fāsuto Furinji); #360 "One More" (もう一人, Mō Hitori); #361 "Astronomical First Light" (アストロノミカル・ファーストライト, Asutoronomikaru Fāsuto Raito); #362 "Everyone's Silence" (みんなの沈黙に, Minna no Chinmoku ni); #363 "Before I Get to the Moon" (月へ行く前に, Tsuki e Iku Mae ni); #364 "Home" (Home, Hōmu); #365 "Four Barefoot Men" (裸足の4人, Hadashi no Yo Nin); #366 "The Wide Thrower and the Wet Guy" (暴投男とびしょ濡れ男, Bōtō Otoko to Bishonure Otoko); #367 "Blow It All Away" (吹っ飛ばしてくれ, Futtobashitekure)
40	September 22, 2021	978-4-06-524461-6; 978-4-06-524462-3 (special edition)	February 22, 2022	978-1-63699-631-8
#368 "I Can Hear Hibito's Voice" (日々人の声が聴こえてくるぜ, Hibito no Koe ga Kikoetekuru ze); #369 "2nd Time Brothers" (2回目兄弟, Ni Kai Me Kyōdai); #370 "To the Base's Heart" (基地の心臓部へ, Kichi no Shinzōbu e); #371 "The Moon's Core" (月の要, Tsuki no Kaname); #372 "It's Almost Time" (もうすぐだ, Mō Sugu Da); #373 "Cut Off" (断絶, Danzetsu); #374 "You're Already There, Right?" (もういるんだろ, Mō Irundaro); #375 "Day of Miracles" (奇跡の日, Kiseki no Hi); #376 "Reunion" (再会, Saikai)
41	May 23, 2022	978-4-06-527153-7; 978-4-06-527154-4 (special edition)	November 8, 2022	978-1-68491-539-2
#377 "Welcome" (ウェルカム, Werukamu); #378 "And Also, Kind of..." (あと何気に, Ato Nanige ni); #379 "Update" (更新, Kōshin); #380 "Day of Revival" (復活の日, Fukkatsu no Hi); #381 "The Best Start" (最高のこれから, Saikō no Korekara); #382 "Symbol" (シンボル, Shinboru); #383 "The Man in Charge" (任された人, Makasareta Hito); #384 "Into the Darkness" (闇の中へ, Yami no Naka e); #385 "Shiny Zone" (キラキラゾーン, Kira Kira Zōn)
42	December 22, 2022	978-4-06-530078-7; 978-4-06-530081-7 (special edition)	April 25, 2023	978-1-68491-886-7
#386 "Like We're Finally Side by Side" (ようやく並んだような, Yōyaku Naranda Yō na); #387 "Bringing into Focus" (ヒントでピント, Hinto de Pinto); #388 "This Is It" (最後なんだ, Saigo Nanda); #389 "I Don't Want It to End" (終わりたくなくて, Owaritakunakute); #390 "This Summer's Brothers" (この夏の兄弟, Kono Natsu no Kyōdai); #391 "Eve of Return" (帰還前日, Kikan Zenjitsu); #392 "Goodbye, Moon" (さよならムーン, Sayonara Mūn); #393 "A Sight That Makes Your Heart Flutter" (胸騒ぎの風景, Munasawagi no Fūkei); #394 "To the Orel" (オリョールへ, Oryōru e)
43	September 22, 2023	978-4-06-532538-4; 978-4-06-532562-9 (limited edition)	January 23, 2024	979-8-88933-334-0
#395 "Hands of Fire" (火の手, Hi no Te); #396 "Still Alive" (まだ生きてる, Mada Ikiteru); #397 "Please, Orel" (頼むぜ帰還船, Tanomu ze Oryōru); #398 "I'll Go" (俺が行く, Ore ga Iku); #399 "Something to Tell the Two of You" (二人に伝えること, Futari ni Tsutaeru Koto); #400 "For the Two of Them" (二人のために, Futari no Tame ni); #401 "Connect" (つなぐ, Tsunagu); #402 "Saying Goodbye" (別れの挨拶, Wakare no Aisatsu); #403 "Because We're Brothers" (兄弟だからこそ, Kyōdai Dakara koso)
44	July 23, 2024	978-4-06-536000-2; 978-4-06-536202-0 (special edition)	December 17, 2024	979-8-89478-303-1
#404 "World of Death" (死の世界, Shi no Sekai); #405 "Until I Grab the Soyuz" (ソユーズを摑むまで, Soyūzu o Tsukamu made); #406 "Hang On Tight" (摑まってろ, Tsukamattero); #407 "It's Over" (終わりだ, Owari Da); #408 "Helpless" (何もできない, Nanimo Dekinai); #409 "Boomerang" (ブーメラン, Būmeran); #410 "The Same Outer Space" (同じ宇宙, Onaji Uchū); #411 "All We Can Do Is Hope" (ただ願うことくらいしか, Tada Negau Koto kurai shika); #412 "Messages Unheard" (届かぬメッセージ, Todokanu Messēji)
45	July 23, 2025	978-4-06-540032-6; 978-4-06-540077-7 (special edition)	December 30, 2025	979-8-89478-812-8
#413 "Four and a Half Hours" (4時間半, Yojikan Han); #414 "Like Brian" (ブライアンのように, Buraian no Yō ni); #415 "Elliptical Orbit" (楕円軌道, Daen Kidō); #416 "Painful Hope" (苦しいほどの希望, Kurushii Hodo no Kibō); #417 "Hibito Is Coming" (日々人が来る, Hibito ga Kuru); #418 "Searching" (捜す, Sagasu); #419 "Last Words" (遺言, Yuigon); #420 "Flashing Light" (点滅, Tenmetsu); #421 "Last Chance" (最後のチャンス, Saigo no Chansu)
46	July 22, 2026	978-4-06-544201-2; 978-4-06-544200-5 (special edition)	October 27, 2026	979-8-89830-297-9
#422 "Got It!" (摑んだ!, Tsukanda!); #423 "Crazy Brothers" (なんて兄弟, Nante Kyōdai); #424 "Good News" (吉報, Kippō); #425 "Like He Showed Up Making a Peace Sign" (ピースしながら出てきたみたいな, Pīsu Shinagara Detekita Mitai na); #426 "Hero's Interview" (ヒーローインタビュー, Hīrō Intabyū); #427 "What Kind of Confession" (なんの告白, Nan no Kokuhaku); #428 "Ballistic Flight" (弾道飛行, Dandō Hikō); #429 "Home Again" (帰ってきた, Kaettekita); #430 "I'm Back! I'm Home! I'm Back!" (ただいま おかえり ただいま, Tadaima Okaeri Tadaima); #431 "Shaaaaaa" (シャアアアアアッ, Shaaaaaa'); #432 "Little Brother Hibito and Big Brother Mutta" (弟 日々人と兄 六太, Otōto Hibito to Ani Mutta); #425.5 Ashi ga Chi ni Tsukanai (足が地に着かない) (Note: Included in the booklet of the special edition.)
