= Manga Taishō =

Japanese manga award

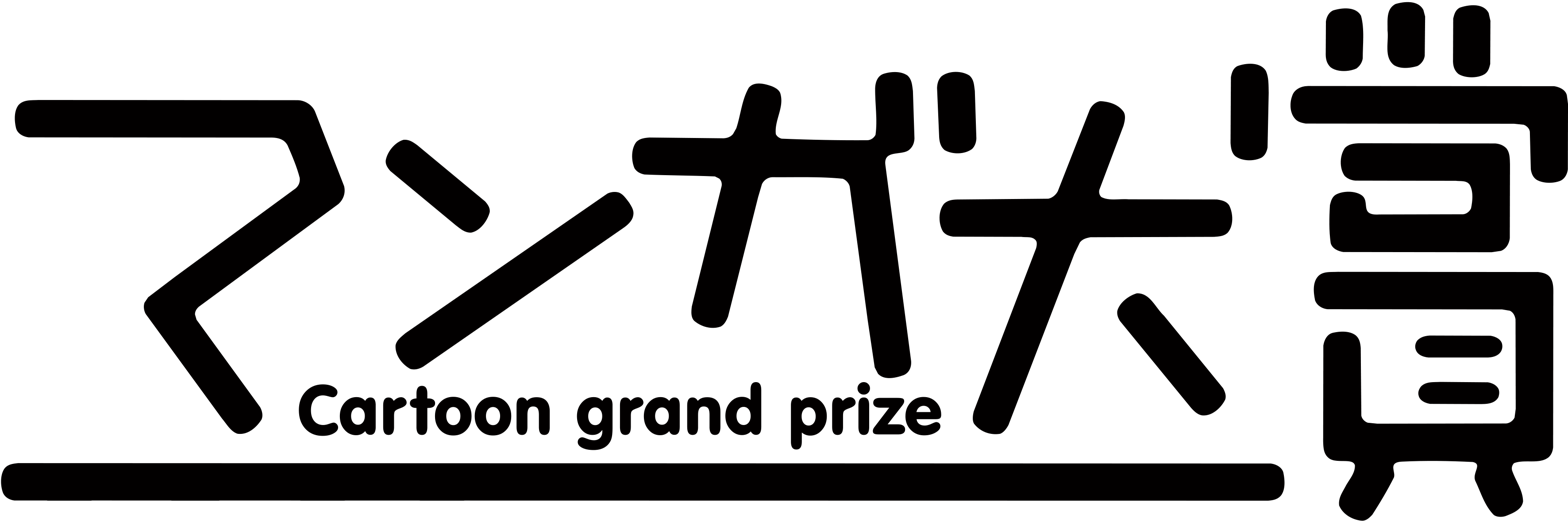
- Awarded for: Manga of eight or fewer volumes in length
- Country: Japan
- Presented by: Manga Taishō Executive Committee
- First award: March 28, 2008; 18 years ago
- Most recent winner: Hon Nara Uru Hodo by Ao Kojima

Highlights
- Most nominations: Akiko Higashimura and Yama Wayama (7)
- Website: mangataisho.com

The Manga Taishō (マンガ大賞; transl. Cartoon Grand Prize) is a Japanese comics award recognizing achievement in manga. It is awarded annually to a manga series published in the previous calendar year of eight or fewer collected volumes in length. The Manga Taishō was founded with the aim of recognizing new and relatively unestablished manga, and to provide a platform to promote these works to new readers. To this end, the prize utilizes a judging criteria of recognizing manga one would "want to recommend to friends", rather than a strictly meritocratic evaluation of artistic excellence.

The prize is presented by the Manga Taishō Executive Committee, a volunteer group of roughly one hundred "manga lovers from all walks of life", primarily bookstore workers who manage in-store manga sections. Individuals directly involved with the manga industry, such as manga artists, authors, book designers, and editors, are barred from sitting on the committee; this distinguishes the Manga Taishō from the majority of the other major manga industry awards, which are typically organized by a specific publishing company and voted on by the company's editors. The Manga Taishō was established by Nippon Broadcasting System news announcer Hisanori Yoshida, who sought to create a prize as a manga equivalent of the Japan Booksellers' Award, a similarly structured award which recognizes literature.

The voting system, also based on that of the Japan Booksellers' Award, is divided into two rounds. In the first round, each committee member nominates five titles, and the top ten titles are shortlisted for the prize. In the event of a tie, both titles are nominated and the shortlist is lengthened; the largest shortlist was in 2012, with fifteen nominees. The second round is a ranked vote, where each member reads each nominated work at their own expense, and selects their top three choices in order of preference. Points are assigned based on rank (three points for first preference, two for second, one for third), the rankings are aggregated, and the title with the most points wins. Winning titles cannot be re-nominated in subsequent years. The Manga Taishō does not award a cash prize, though winning titles are promoted heavily in bookstores across Japan; the prize is thus recognized as being a significant sales driver for manga, and winning titles are frequently adapted into anime or television dramas.

The inaugural Manga Taishō was awarded on March 28, 2008, to Gaku: Minna no Yama by Shinichi Ishizuka, and in 2026 to Hon Nara Uru Hodo by Ao Kojima. Since its inception, the Manga Taishō has been awarded annually, with nineteen winners as of 2026. Akiko Higashimura and Yama Wayama are the most-nominated authors, with seven nominations each including Higashimura's win for Blank Canvas: My So-Called Artist's Journey in 2015. The highest-scoring series in the prize's history is a three-way tie between Chihayafuru by Yuki Suetsugu, Draw This, Then Die! by Minoru Toyoda, and Alice, All the Way to Outer Space by Kiko Urino, each winning the Manga Taishō with 102 points in 2009, 2023 and 2025 respectively; 2023's runner-up, Akane-banashi by Yūki Suenaga and Takamasa Moue, is the highest-scoring series in the prize's history to not win the Manga Taishō, with 100 points. The most-nominated series are Delicious in Dungeon by Ryoko Kui and Onna no Sono no Hoshi by Yama Wayama, each with four. No author has won the award multiple times.

== Winners and nominees ==
‡ Indicates the winner

2000s winners and nominees
Award year	Title	Author(s)	Points	Ref(s).
2008 (1st)	Gaku: Minna no Yama ‡	Shinichi Ishizuka	68	
2008 (1st)	Yotsuba&!	Kiyohiko Azuma	49	
2008 (1st)	Umimachi Diary	Akimi Yoshida	43	
2008 (1st)	Flower of Life	Fumi Yoshinaga	43	
2008 (1st)	Kimi ni Todoke	Karuho Shiina	42	
2008 (1st)	Ōoku: The Inner Chambers	Fumi Yoshinaga	40	
2008 (1st)	Imperial Guards	Daisuke Satō and Yū Itō	35	
2008 (1st)	Tomehane! Suzuri Kōkō Shodōbu	Katsutoshi Kawai	27	
2008 (1st)	Moyasimon: Tales of Agriculture	Masayuki Ishikawa	26	
2008 (1st)	Natsume's Book of Friends	Yuki Midorikawa	23	
2008 (1st)	Himawari: Kenichi Legend	Akiko Higashimura	20	
2008 (1st)	What Did You Eat Yesterday?	Fumi Yoshinaga	19	
2009 (2nd)	Chihayafuru ‡	Yuki Suetsugu	102	
2009 (2nd)	Space Brothers	Chūya Koyama	94	
2009 (2nd)	March Comes In like a Lion	Chica Umino	65	
2009 (2nd)	Shin'ya Shokudō	Yarō Abe	47	
2009 (2nd)	Seishun Shōnen Magazine 1978–1983	Makoto Kobayashi	46	
2009 (2nd)	Saint Young Men	Hikaru Nakamura	45	
2009 (2nd)	Tomehane! Suzuri Kōkō Shodōbu	Katsutoshi Kawai	43	
2009 (2nd)	Mama wa Tenparist	Akiko Higashimura	36	
2009 (2nd)	Toriko	Mitsutoshi Shimabukuro	25	
2009 (2nd)	You're Being Summoned, Azazel	Yasuhisa Kubo	15	
2010 (3rd)	Thermae Romae ‡	Mari Yamazaki	94	
2010 (3rd)	Space Brothers	Chūya Koyama	89	
2010 (3rd)	Bakuman	Tsugumi Ohba and Takeshi Obata	60	
2010 (3rd)	I Am a Hero	Kengo Hanazawa	55	
2010 (3rd)	Otoko no Isshō	Keiko Nishi	48	
2010 (3rd)	Mushi to Uta: Ichikawa Haruko Sakuhin-Shū	Haruko Ichikawa	47	
2010 (3rd)	Princess Jellyfish	Akiko Higashimura	46	
2010 (3rd)	Moteki	Mitsurou Kubo	44	
2010 (3rd)	Kōkō Kyūji Zawa-san	Eriko Mishima	25	
2010 (3rd)	Aoi Honō	Kazuhiko Shimamoto	23	
2011 (4th)	March Comes In like a Lion ‡	Chica Umino	75	
2011 (4th)	A Bride's Story	Kaoru Mori	55	
2011 (4th)	I Am a Hero	Kengo Hanazawa	51	
2011 (4th)	Hana no Zubora-Meshi	Masayuki Kusumi and Etsuko Mizusawa	50	
2011 (4th)	Shitsuren Chocolatier	Setona Mizushiro	47	
2011 (4th)	Sayonara Mo Iwazu Ni	Kentarō Ueno	42	
2011 (4th)	Attack on Titan	Hajime Isayama	41	
2011 (4th)	Kokkoku: Moment by Moment	Seita Horio	38	
2011 (4th)	Those Snow White Notes	Marimo Ragawa	36	
2011 (4th)	Drifters	Kouta Hirano	35	
2011 (4th)	Don't Cry, Girl	Tomoko Yamashita	35	
2011 (4th)	Omo ni Naitemasu	Akiko Higashimura	27	
2011 (4th)	Saru	Daisuke Igarashi	21	
2012 (5th)	Silver Spoon ‡	Hiromu Arakawa	76	
2012 (5th)	Giga Tokyo Toy Box	Ume	61	
2012 (5th)	Nobunaga Concerto	Ayumi Ishii	57	
2012 (5th)	Descending Stories: Showa Genroku Rakugo Shinju	Haruko Kumota	49	
2012 (5th)	25-ji no Bakansu	Haruko Ichikawa	46	
2012 (5th)	Drifters	Kouta Hirano	43	
2012 (5th)	Gurazeni	Yūji Moritaka and Keiji Adachi	41	
2012 (5th)	I Am a Hero	Kengo Hanazawa	40	
2012 (5th)	Skygrazer	Masakazu Ishiguro	37	
2012 (5th)	Takasugi-san's Obento	Nozomi Yanahara	37	
2012 (5th)	Hibi Rock	Katsumasa Enokiya	32	
2012 (5th)	The Flowers of Evil	Shūzō Oshimi	28	
2012 (5th)	Your Lie in April	Naoshi Arakawa	27	
2012 (5th)	Hozuki's Coolheadedness	Natsumi Eguchi	24	
2012 (5th)	My Neighbor Seki	Takuma Morishige	12	
2013 (6th)	Umimachi Diary ‡	Akimi Yoshida	89	
2013 (6th)	A Bride's Story	Kaoru Mori	78	
2013 (6th)	Welcome to the Ballroom	Tomo Takeuchi	78	
2013 (6th)	Hi Score Girl	Rensuke Oshikiri	62	
2013 (6th)	My Love Story!!	Kazune Kawahara and Aruko	58	
2013 (6th)	Assassination Classroom	Yusei Matsui	40	
2013 (6th)	Seven Little Sons of the Dragon: A Collection of Seven Stories	Ryoko Kui	36	
2013 (6th)	Ningen Karimenchū	Taeko Uzuki	35	
2013 (6th)	Terra Formars	Yū Sasuga and Kenichi Tachibana	30	
2013 (6th)	Sanzoku Diary	Kentarō Okamoto	29	
2013 (6th)	Bokura no Funka-sai	Keigo Shinzō	29	
2014 (7th)	A Bride's Story ‡	Kaoru Mori	94	
2014 (7th)	Erased	Kei Sanbe	82	
2014 (7th)	Sayonara, Tama-chan	Kazuyoshi Takeda	66	
2014 (7th)	The Seven Deadly Sins	Nakaba Suzuki	59	
2014 (7th)	Terrarium in a Drawer	Ryoko Kui	54	
2014 (7th)	Jūhan Shuttai!	Naoko Matsuda	46	
2014 (7th)	One-Punch Man	One	43	
2014 (7th)	Ajin: Demi-Human	Gamon Sakurai	32	
2014 (7th)	Ashizuri Suizokukan	Panpanya	31	
2014 (7th)	Haven't You Heard? I'm Sakamoto	Nami Sano	9	
2015 (8th)	Blank Canvas: My So-Called Artist's Journey ‡	Akiko Higashimura	80	
2015 (8th)	Kodomo wa Wakatte Agenai	Rettō Tajima	66	
2015 (8th)	A Silent Voice	Yoshitoki Ōima	65	
2015 (8th)	Erased	Kei Sanbe	57	
2015 (8th)	Blue Giant	Shinichi Ishizuka	49	
2015 (8th)	Welcome to the Ballroom	Tomo Takeuchi	40	
2015 (8th)	Innocent	Shin-ichi Sakamoto	38	
2015 (8th)	My Hero Academia	Kōhei Horikoshi	36	
2015 (8th)	Ōsama-tachi no Viking	Sadayasu and Makoto Fukami	35	
2015 (8th)	Kasane	Daruma Matsuura	30	
2015 (8th)	Monthly Girls' Nozaki-kun	Izumi Tsubaki	28	
2015 (8th)	The Ancient Magus' Bride	Kore Yamazaki	28	
2015 (8th)	Land of the Lustrous	Haruko Ichikawa	18	
2015 (8th)	Dimitri Tomkins	Fumiko Takano	8	
2016 (9th)	Golden Kamuy ‡	Satoru Noda	91	
2016 (9th)	Delicious in Dungeon	Ryoko Kui	78	
2016 (9th)	Blue Giant	Shinichi Ishizuka	68	
2016 (9th)	Erased	Kei Sanbe	55	
2016 (9th)	Hyakumanjō Labyrinth	Takamichi	49	
2016 (9th)	Wave, Listen to Me!	Hiroaki Samura	43	
2016 (9th)	After the Rain	Jun Mayuzuki	42	
2016 (9th)	Machida-kun no Sekai	Yuki Andō	38	
2016 (9th)	Tokyo Tarareba Girls	Akiko Higashimura	29	
2016 (9th)	Okazaki ni Sasagu	Saho Yamamoto	28	
2016 (9th)	Tonkatsu DJ Agetarō	Ipyao and Yujiro Koyama	25	
2017 (10th)	Hibiki: Shōsetsuka ni Naru Hōhō ‡	Mitsuharu Yanamoto	67	
2017 (10th)	Gold Kingdom and Water Kingdom	Nao Iwamoto	64	
2017 (10th)	Delicious in Dungeon	Ryoko Kui	63	
2017 (10th)	Aoashi	Yugo Kobayashi and Naohiko Ueno	60	
2017 (10th)	Wave, Listen to Me!	Hiroaki Samura	48	
2017 (10th)	The Promised Neverland	Kaiu Shirai and Posuka Demizu	43	
2017 (10th)	Golden Gold	Seita Horio	42	
2017 (10th)	Fire Punch	Tatsuki Fujimoto	37	
2017 (10th)	Hi Score Girl	Rensuke Oshikiri	33	
2017 (10th)	Teasing Master Takagi-san	Sōichirō Yamamoto	30	
2017 (10th)	My Boy	Hitomi Takano	20	
2017 (10th)	Tokyo Tarareba Girls	Akiko Higashimura	18	
2017 (10th)	Drifting Dragons	Taku Kuwabara	9	
2018 (11th)	Beastars ‡	Paru Itagaki	78	
2018 (11th)	Warera Contactee	Rui Morita	68	
2018 (11th)	Nagi no Oitoma	Misato Konari	56	
2018 (11th)	Delicious in Dungeon	Ryoko Kui	52	
2018 (11th)	To Your Eternity	Yoshitoki Ōima	47	
2018 (11th)	Smile Down the Runway	Kotoba Inoya	46	
2018 (11th)	Witch Hat Atelier	Kamome Shirahama	42	
2018 (11th)	Made in Abyss	Akihito Tsukushi	40	
2018 (11th)	Keep Your Hands Off Eizouken!	Sumito Ōwara	38	
2018 (11th)	Pompo: The Cinéphile	Shogo Sugitani	28	
2018 (11th)	The Promised Neverland	Kaiu Shirai and Posuka Demizu	26	
2018 (11th)	Golden Gold	Seita Horio	13	
2019 (12th)	Astra Lost in Space ‡	Kenta Shinohara	94	
2019 (12th)	Don't Call It Mystery	Yumi Tamura	78	
2019 (12th)	Blue Period	Tsubasa Yamaguchi	73	
2019 (12th)	Journal with Witch	Tomoko Yamashita	45	
2019 (12th)	Sazan to Suisei no Shōjo	Yuriko Akase	41	
2019 (12th)	Go with the Clouds, North by Northwest	Aki Irie	40	
2019 (12th)	Kongōji-san wa Mendōkusai	Minoru Toyoda	39	
2019 (12th)	BL Metamorphosis	Kaori Tsurutani	38	
2019 (12th)	Hakumei and Mikochi	Takuto Kashiki	33	
2019 (12th)	Nagi no Oitoma	Misato Konari	25	
2019 (12th)	Delicious in Dungeon	Ryoko Kui	23	
2019 (12th)	Golden Gold	Seita Horio	22	
2019 (12th)	1122: For a Happy Marriage	Peko Watanabe	19	
2020 (13th)	Blue Period ‡	Tsubasa Yamaguchi	69	
2020 (13th)	Spy × Family	Tatsuya Endo	63	
2020 (13th)	Skip and Loafer	Misaki Takamatsu	58	
2020 (13th)	Wave, Listen to Me!	Hiroaki Samura	57	
2020 (13th)	Mizu wa Umi ni Mukatte Nagareru	Rettō Tajima	56	
2020 (13th)	Don't Call It Mystery	Yumi Tamura	54	
2020 (13th)	Captivated, by You	Yama Wayama	50	
2020 (13th)	Chainsaw Man	Tatsuki Fujimoto	40	
2020 (13th)	Maku Musubi	Shin Hotani	36	
2020 (13th)	Journal with Witch	Tomoko Yamashita	31	
2020 (13th)	The Dangers in My Heart	Norio Sakurai	24	
2020 (13th)	Since I Could Die Tomorrow	Kari Sumako	20	
2021 (14th)	Frieren: Beyond Journey's End ‡	Kanehito Yamada and Tsukasa Abe	91	
2021 (14th)	Orb: On the Movements of the Earth	Uoto	67	
2021 (14th)	Let's Go Karaoke!	Yama Wayama	64	
2021 (14th)	Mizu wa Umi ni Mukatte Nagareru	Rettō Tajima	60	
2021 (14th)	Oshi no Ko	Aka Akasaka and Mengo Yokoyari	59	
2021 (14th)	Kaiju No. 8	Naoya Matsumoto	58	
2021 (14th)	Onna no Sono no Hoshi	Yama Wayama	57	
2021 (14th)	BL Metamorphosis	Kaori Tsurutani	48	
2021 (14th)	Kowloon Generic Romance	Jun Mayuzuki	46	
2021 (14th)	Spy × Family	Tatsuya Endo	38	
2022 (15th)	The Darwin Incident ‡	Shun Umezawa	74	
2022 (15th)	Look Back	Tatsuki Fujimoto	68	
2022 (15th)	Hirayasumi	Keigo Shinzō	66	
2022 (15th)	Onna no Sono no Hoshi	Yama Wayama	63	
2022 (15th)	Orb: On the Movements of the Earth	Uoto	59	
2022 (15th)	Trillion Game	Riichiro Inagaki and Ryoichi Ikegami	55	
2022 (15th)	Dandadan	Yukinobu Tatsu	53	
2022 (15th)	Oshi no Ko	Aka Akasaka and Mengo Yokoyari	49	
2022 (15th)	The Credits Roll into the Sea	John Tarachine	45	
2022 (15th)	Takahashi from the Bike Shop	Arare Matsumushi	32	
2023 (16th)	Draw This, Then Die! ‡	Minoru Toyoda	102	
2023 (16th)	Akane-banashi	Yūki Suenaga and Takamasa Moue	100	
2023 (16th)	Onna no Sono no Hoshi	Yama Wayama	65	
2023 (16th)	You and I Are Polar Opposites	Kōcha Agasawa	65	
2023 (16th)	Nippon Sangoku	Ikka Matsuki	59	
2023 (16th)	A Witch's Life in Mongol	Tomato Soup	59	
2023 (16th)	Goodbye, Eri	Tatsuki Fujimoto	44	
2023 (16th)	Smoking Behind the Supermarket with You	Jinushi	34	
2023 (16th)	Gekiko Kamen	Takayuki Yamaguchi	32	
2023 (16th)	Takopi's Original Sin	Taizan 5	29	
2023 (16th)	The Summer Hikaru Died	Mokumokuren	22	
2024 (17th)	Spacewalking with You ‡	Inuhiko Doronoda	96	
2024 (17th)	Daemons of the Shadow Realm	Hiromu Arakawa	73	
2024 (17th)	Neighborhood Craftsmen: Stories from Kanda's Gokura-chou	Akihito Sakaue	72	
2024 (17th)	Shimazaki in the Land of Peace	Gōden Hamada and Takeshi Seshimo	59	
2024 (17th)	The Days of Diamond	Ōhashi Hirai	56	
2024 (17th)	A Witch's Life in Mongol	Tomato Soup	56	
2024 (17th)	You and I Are Polar Opposites	Kōcha Agasawa	50	
2024 (17th)	Hirayasumi	Keigo Shinzō	49	
2024 (17th)	Tamaki & Amane	Fumi Yoshinaga	49	
2024 (17th)	Fami-res Iko	Yama Wayama	28	
2025 (18th)	Alice, All the Way to Outer Space ‡	Kiko Urino	102	
2025 (18th)	Robō no Fujii	Kurao Nabe	79	
2025 (18th)	Girl Meets Rock!	Kuwahali and Tetsuo Ideuchi	75	
2025 (18th)	Magus of the Library	Mitsu Izumi	69	
2025 (18th)	When the Chameleon Flowers Bloom	Shiho Kido	51	
2025 (18th)	Re-Living My Life with a Boyfriend Who Doesn't Remember Me	Eiko Mutsuhana, Gin Shirakawa, and Yugiri Aika	45	
2025 (18th)	Onna no Sono no Hoshi	Yama Wayama	44	
2025 (18th)	Cosmos	Ryuhei Tamura	38	
2025 (18th)	This World Is Worth Fighting For	Hatsumi Kodama	37	
2025 (18th)	Dokagui Daisuki! Mochizuki-san	Kamome Maruyono	24	
2026 (19th)	Hon Nara Uru Hodo	Ao Kojima	77	
2026 (19th)	Danmitsu	Tooru Seino	59	
2026 (19th)	The Devil's in the Lunch Deals	Ishiko	58	
2026 (19th)	Home at the Horizon	Taiyō Watabe	54	
2026 (19th)	Tomodachi Datta Hito: Kinuta Miya Sakuhinshū	Miya Kinuta	53	
2026 (19th)	The Kaiju Autopsy	Mado Saitō	50	
2026 (19th)	Robō no Fujii	Kurao Nabe	48	
2026 (19th)	Strikeout Pitch	Kyu Sumiyoshi	39	
2026 (19th)	RIOT	Yūta Tsukada	36	
2026 (19th)	Ichi the Witch	Osamu Nishi and Shiro Usazaki	33	
2026 (19th)	Maison and the Man-Eating Apartment	Kuu Tanaka and Akima	30	
2026 (19th)	Imōto wa Shitte Iru	Mari Gangi	27	

== Multiple nominations ==
=== Works ===
The following works have been nominated for the Manga Taishō multiple times; winning titles are indicated with ‡.

Titles with multiple nominations
Nominations	Title
4	Delicious in Dungeon
4	Onna no Sono no Hoshi
3	A Bride's Story ‡
3	Erased
3	Golden Gold
3	I Am a Hero
3	Wave, Listen to Me!
2	BL Metamorphosis
2	Blue Giant
2	Blue Period ‡
2	Chi: On the Movements of the Earth
2	Don't Call It Mystery
2	Drifters
2	Hi Score Girl
2	Hirayasumi
2	Journal with Witch
2	March Comes In like a Lion ‡
2	Mizu wa Umi ni Mukatte Nagareru
2	Nagi no Oitoma
2	Oshi no Ko
2	The Promised Neverland
2	Robō no Fujii
2	Space Brothers
2	Spy × Family
2	Tokyo Tarareba Girls
2	Tomehane! Suzuri Kōkō Shodōbu
2	Umimachi Diary ‡
2	Welcome to the Ballroom
2	A Witch's Life in Mongol
2	You and I Are Polar Opposites

=== Authors ===
The following authors have received multiple Manga Taishō nominations for their manga; winning authors are indicated with ‡.

Authors with multiple nominations
Nominations	Author
7	Akiko Higashimura ‡
7	Yama Wayama
6	Ryoko Kui
4	Tatsuki Fujimoto
4	Seita Horio
4	Haruko Ichikawa
4	Fumi Yoshinaga
3	Kengo Hanazawa
3	Shinichi Ishizuka ‡
3	Kaoru Mori ‡
3	Hiroaki Samura
3	Kei Sanbe
3	Keigo Shinzō
3	Rettō Tajima
3	Tomoko Yamashita
2	Kōcha Agasawa
2	Aka Akasaka
2	Hiromu Arakawa
2	Posuka Demizu
2	Tatsuya Endo
2	Kouta Hirano
2	Katsutoshi Kawai
2	Misato Konari
2	Chūya Koyama
2	Kamome Maruyono
2	Jun Mayuzuki
2	Kurao Nabe
2	Yoshitoki Ōima
2	Rensuke Oshikiri
2	Kaiu Shirai
2	Tomo Takeuchi
2	Yumi Tamura
2	Tomato Soup
2	Minoru Toyoda
2	Kaori Tsurutani
2	Chica Umino ‡
2	Uoto
2	Tsubasa Yamaguchi ‡
2	Mengo Yokoyari
2	Akimi Yoshida ‡
