= List of Space Brothers characters =

The following is a list of characters for the Japanese manga series by Chūya Koyama, Space Brothers, which has been adapted into an anime television series and a live-action film.

== Main characters ==
Mutta Nanba (南波 六太, Nanba Mutta)
Portrayal Shun Oguri (film), Hiroaki Hirata (anime), Miyuki Sawashiro (anime, young)
The elder Nanba brother who was born on October 28, 1993, when Japan lost the 1994 FIFA World Cup qualification match in Qatar. He has always wanted to stay a step ahead of his younger brother, but ran into trouble after getting fired from his job, for head butting his boss like Zinedine Zidane did to Marco Materazzi in the 2006 FIFA World Cup Final. After Hibito asked their mother to send in his astronaut application to JAXA, he is chosen to join their astronaut recruitment program and overcomes hardships of JAXA's continuous tests.
Hibito Nanba (南波 日々人, Nanba Hibito)
Portrayal Masaki Okada (film), Kenn (anime), Yūko Sanpei (anime, young)
The younger Nanba brother who was born on September 17, 1996, when Hideo Nomo pitches a no-hitter against the Colorado Rockies, leading the Los Angeles Dodgers to a 9-0 victory in Major League Baseball. He is currently the first Japanese astronaut preparing to go on a lunar landing, thus achieving the brothers' childhood dream. He is supportive of Mutta.
Serika Itō (伊東 せりか, Itō Serika)
Portrayal Kumiko Asō (film), Miyuki Sawashiro (anime)
One of Mutta's fellow applicants in the astronaut program, who he has a huge crush on. When young, her father developed amyotrophic lateral sclerosis (ALS) which could not be cured at the time. After he died, Serika became motivated to become an astronaut and develop new cures for rare diseases and illnesses aboard the International Space Station.
Kenji Makabe (真壁 ケンジ, Makabe Kenji)
Portrayal Yoshio Inoue (film), Masayuki Katō (anime)
One of Mutta's fellow applicants in the astronaut program. He resides with his wife and daughter. He is good at guessing people's ages and Mutta's close friend.
Apo (アポ)
Portrayal Miyuki Sawashiro (anime)
Hibito's pet pug he has while in Houston, named after the Apollo program.

== Supporting characters ==
Sharon Kaneko (金子・シャロン, Kaneko Sharon)
Voiced by Masako Ikeda
Sharon is an aerospace scientist, who does research by using a telescope to look up into space. She is a mentor to Mutta and Hibito when they were young. She taught them many things such as English and many life lessons. Mutta and Hibito still look to her for their problems and they share a very close relationship. Her dream is to build a lunar telescope on the moon.
Tamura (田村)
Voiced by Mariko Hayashi
Tamura works with Sharon as an assistant who also does research using a telescope.
Mother Nanba (南波母, Nanba-haha)
Voiced by Mayumi Tanaka
She is the mother of Hibito and Mutta. She is a very caring and enthusiastic person.
Nanba Father (南波父, Nanba-chichi)
Voiced by Chō
He is the father of Hibito and Mutta. He has fun doing various impersonations and voices.
Ozzy Smith (オジー・スミス, Ojī Sumisu)
Voiced by Tadashi Nakamura
He is a middle-aged man who enjoys casual gambling and is friends with Hibito in Houston. He and his wife helps walk Hibito's dog Apo.
Mrs. Smith (スミス夫人, Sumisu-fujin)
Voiced by Tamaki Taura
She is a middle-aged woman and Ozzy Smith's wife.
Tadashi Hoshika (星加 正, Hoshika Tadashi)
Voiced by Show Ryuzanji
He is an employee at JAXA who initially wanted to become an astronaut but wasn't lucky enough. He inspired Mutta and Hibito when they were young and is fascinated by Mutta. He personally interviewed Mutta's colleagues about the headbutting incident when the issue was raised by JAXA's selection committee.
Jennifer (ジェニファー, Jenifā)
Voiced by Yuko Tachibana
She is Mutta's guide around NASA when he visits. She is very talkative and is knowledgeable of NASA and astronaut training and gave Mutta many tips.
Fumi Aotake (青竹 フミ, Aotake Fumi)
Voiced by Toa Yukinari
She is an aspiring astronaut who becomes friends with Serika during the examination process. She drops out after the second exam.
Reiji Nitta (新田 零次, Niita Reiji)
Voiced by Takanori Hoshino
He was one of Mutta's fellow applicants in the astronaut program and one of the few that passed the third exam. Nitta was in the same "A" team as Mutta during the third exam. He is a sharp, smart and a calm man. He studied sports medicine at the University of Tsukaba and he also enjoys playing kendo.
Yasushi Furuya (古谷 やすし, Furuya Yasushi)
Voiced by Ryo Naito
He was one of Mutta's fellow applicants in the astronaut program and was in the same "A" team as Mutta during the third exam. He is a biology student from Kyoto. He is a young man with a quick temper and is often quick to point out errors and has no problem speaking his mind.
Naoto Fukuda (福田 直人, Fukuda Naoto)
Voiced by Naoki Bandō
He was one of Mutta's fellow applicants in the astronaut program and was in the same "A" team as Mutta during the third exam. He is a middle-aged man who worked on rocket development. He is following his dreams after "losing" his daughter when he was an absent father due to his rocket work. He is friendly and talkative.
Shigeo Nasuda (茄子田 シゲオ, Nasuda Shigeo)
Voiced by Yutaka Aoyama
He is the director at JAXA. He is rather quirky and upbeat and is very much interested in Mutta. His name is a play on NASDA, one of JAXA's predecessor agencies, and his character design is based on Chiaki Mukai's husband Dr. Makio Mukai.
Tsurumi (鶴見)
Voiced by Eiji Ito
He is a JAXA staff member who helps manage the third exam. He is strict and to the point.
Yamato Mizoguchi (溝口 大和, Mizoguchi Yamato)
Voiced by Shintaro Asanuma
One of Mutta's fellow applicants in the astronaut program and was in the same "B" team as Kenji during the third exam. He was one of the few that passed the third exam.
Ena Kitamura (北村 絵名, Kitamura Ena)
Voiced by Yuko Sanpei
One of Mutta's fellow applicants in the astronaut program and was in the same "B" team as Kenji during the third exam. She was one of the few that passed the third exam.
Ryūnosuke Tomii (富井 竜之介, Tomii Ryūnosuke)
Voiced by Shigeyuki Susaki
One of Mutta's fellow applicants in the astronaut program and was in the same "B" team as Kenji during the third exam. He is smart and spends a lot of time playing with a Rubik's cube that he carries around. He is rather shy and is the youngest member of Team B.
Yūri Teshima (手島 有利, Teshima Yūri)
Voiced by Masayasu Nagata
One of Mutta's fellow applicants in the astronaut program and was in the same "B" team as Kenji during the third exam. He was one of the few that passed the third exam. However since the start of the exam he has been very nervous and can usually be seen shaking his leg or looking worried. He joined the program because his father wanted him to become an astronaut. He is named after Soviet Union astronaut Yuri Gagarin. He has a huge interest on extra-terrestrial life forms research.
Manabu Sawaki (沢木 学, Sawaki Manabu)
Voiced by Takeshi Ohba
One of Mutta's fellow applicants in the astronaut program and was in the "C" team during the third exam. He is very athletic and is often seen with Yamato.
Raleigh Cuomo (ローリー・クオモ, Rōrī Kuomo)
Voiced by Ryosuke Sakamaki
He is an American astronaut, who likes Japanese things like sushi. He is Hibito's backup on the upcoming mission to the moon.
Takio Azuma (吾妻 滝生, Azuma Takio)
Voiced by Kenji Nomura
He is an astronaut at JAXA. He is the Japanese astronaut who has spent the most time working in space, having done several missions on the ISS. It seems that he has a grudge against Hibito for being chosen over him to go on an upcoming lunar landing mission.
Deniel Young (デニール・ヤング, Denīru Yangu)
Portrayal Taro Ishida (anime), Buzz Aldrin (film)
NASA's eccentric veteran flight trainer that enjoys Ice Breakers Sours. In the live action movie his role is taken by Buzz Aldrin.
