= The Devil's in the Lunch Deals =

Japanese manga series

- First tankōbon volume cover

邪神の弁当屋さん (Jashin no Bentō-ya-san)
- Genre: Fantasy; Gourmet
- Manga
- Written by: Ishiko
- Published by: Kodansha
- English publisher: Kodansha: NA: Tokyopop
- Imprint: Young Magazine KC
- Magazine: Comic Days
- Original run: October 2, 2024 – September 24, 2025
- Volumes: 4

The Devil's in the Lunch Deals (Japanese: 邪神の弁当屋さん, Hepburn: Jashin no Bentō-ya-san) is a Japanese manga series written and illustrated by Ishiko. It was serialized on Kodansha's Comic Days website from October 2024 to September 2025.

== Synopsis ==
The series focuses on Lainey, an ordinary human girl who runs a bento shop. In her previous life, she was a god named Solange, the Goddess of Harvests and Death, who was expelled from the Northern Kingdom thirty years ago due to causing a war between it and the Southern Kingdom. In order to regain her godhood, Lainey realizes that she has to accumulate good deeds.

== Publication ==
Written and illustrated by Ishiko, The Devil's in the Lunch Deals was serialized on Kodansha's Comic Days website from October 2, 2024, to September 24, 2025. Its chapters were compiled into four tankōbon volumes released from January 20, 2025, to January 20, 2026.

The series' chapters are published in English on Kodansha's K Manga app. In February 2026, Tokyopop announced that they had licensed the series for English publication, with the first volume set to release in August later in the year.

No.	Original release date	Original ISBN	English release date	English ISBN
1	January 20, 2025	978-4-06-537855-7	September 29, 2026	978-1-42-788872-3
Chapters 1–4
2	June 19, 2025	978-4-06-539939-2	—	—
3	November 20, 2025	978-4-06-541465-1	—	—
4	January 20, 2026	978-4-06-542146-8	—	—

== Reception ==
The series was nominated for the 2025 Next Manga Award in the web category. The series was ranked third in the 4th Crea Late Night Manga Awards in 2025 hosted by Bungeishunjū's Crea magazine. The series was ranked sixth in the 2026 edition of Takarajimasha's Kono Manga ga Sugoi! guidebook's list of best manga for male readers. The series was ranked thirteenth in the Nationwide Bookstore Employees' Recommended Comics list of 2026. The series was nominated for the 19th Manga Taishō in 2026, and ranked third.
