= Alice, All the Way to Outer Space =

Japanese manga series

- First tankōbon volume cover

ありす、宇宙(どこ)までも (Arisu, Doko Made mo)
- Manga
- Written by: Kiko Urino
- Published by: Shogakukan
- English publisher: NA: Seven Seas Entertainment
- Magazine: Weekly Big Comic Spirits
- Original run: June 3, 2024 – present
- Volumes: 7
- icon

Alice, All the Way to Outer Space (Japanese: ありす、宇宙(どこ)までも, Hepburn: Arisu, Doko Made mo; 'Alice, Even in Space') is a Japanese manga series written and illustrated by Kiko Urino. It has been serialized in Shogakukan's seinen manga magazine Weekly Big Comic Spirits since June 2024.

== Plot ==
Alice Asahida, a middle school girl, is admired for her beauty and athletic ability, but struggles academically due to being "semilingual", having lost fluency in both of her parents' languages after their deaths. Because of her language difficulties, she falls behind in school and begins to lose confidence in her future.

Alice's life changes when she meets Rui Inuboshi, a quiet boy with an exceptionally high IQ, who tells her that she can become anything she wants to be. Inspired by his encouragement, Alice decides to pursue the ambitious dream of becoming an astronaut. With Rui's help, she begins to seriously apply herself to studying, gradually improving her academic abilities while rediscovering the joy of learning. She steadily works toward her long-term goal of becoming an astronaut, taking the first steps toward a career in space exploration.

== Publication ==
Written and illustrated by Kiko Urino, Alice, All the Way to Outer Space started in Shogakukan's seinen manga magazine Weekly Big Comic Spirits on June 3, 2024. Shogakukan has collected its chapters into individual tankōbon volumes, with the first one released on August 30, 2024. As of June 30, 2026, seven volumes have been released.

The manga has been licensed for English release in North America by Seven Seas Entertainment, with the first volume set to release in July 2027.

=== Volumes ===
| No. | Japanese release date | Japanese ISBN |
|---|---|---|
| 1 | August 30, 2024 | 978-4-09-863015-8 |
| 2 | December 26, 2024 | 978-4-09-863102-5 |
| 3 | March 28, 2025 | 978-4-09-863216-9 |
| 4 | June 30, 2025 | 978-4-09-863438-5 |
| 5 | October 30, 2025 | 978-4-09-863618-1 |
| 6 | February 27, 2026 | 978-4-09-863778-2 |
| 7 | June 30, 2026 | 978-4-09-864029-4 |

== Reception ==
The manga ranked 16th on Takarajimasha's Kono Manga ga Sugoi! list of best manga of 2025 for male readers; it ranked 18th on the 2026 list. It won the 18th Manga Taishō in 2025. It was nominated for the eleventh Next Manga Awards in 2025 in the print category, and ranked eleventh.

The series was recommended by manga author Tatsuki Fujimoto.
