= That's Not Love =

Japanese manga series

- First tankōbon volume cover

恋じゃねえから (Koi Janee kara)
- Genre: Drama
- Manga
- Written by: Peko Watanabe
- Published by: Kodansha
- English publisher: NA: Kodansha USA
- Imprint: Morning KC
- Magazine: Morning Two
- Original run: September 21, 2021 – November 21, 2024
- Volumes: 6

That's Not Love (恋じゃねえから, Koi Janee kara) is a Japanese manga series written and illustrated by Peko Watanabe. It was serialized on Kodansha's Morning Two manga website from September 2021 to November 2024.

== Plot ==
Akane attends an art exhibit arranged by her former tutor Imai. While attending the exhibit, she notices that one of Imai's sculptures bears a strong resemblance to her middle school friend Yukari, who she remembers transferring out of school. She also notices that the sculpture has a scar that Yukari shared to her in private, and starts to wonder what the exhibit is trying to suggest.

== Publication ==
Written and illustrated by Peko Watanabe, That's Not Love was serialized on Kodansha's Morning Two manga website from September 21, 2021, to November 21, 2024. Its chapters were collected in six tankōbon volumes released from April 21, 2022, to February 21, 2025.

During their panel at San Diego Comic-Con 2025, Kodansha USA announced that they had licensed the series for English publication beginning in Q2 2026.

No.	Original release date	Original ISBN	English release date	English ISBN
1	April 21, 2022	978-4-06-527544-3	May 26, 2026	979-8-88877-749-7
1. "A Second Chance"; 2. "I Miss You"; 3. "Good News? Or Bad?"; 4. "Like I'm in Love"; 5. "When You're Actually Sober"; 6. "'Course I Hated It!"
2	January 23, 2023	978-4-06-530411-2	July 28, 2026	979-8-88877-752-7
7. "My Feelings for You"; 8. "You're His Muse"; 9. "In the Mood for Proper Sex"; 10. "The Hell with This"; 11. "Not Sensei, But Me"; 12. "Put an End to It"
3	July 21, 2023	978-4-06-532335-9	September 29, 2026	979-8-88877-753-4
13. "I've Always Loved Her"; 14. "Play Them Right"; 15. "Was It Really Love?"; 16. "What Kind of an Idiot Are You"; 17. "Let's Blow It All"; 18. "We Showed 'Em"
4	January 23, 2024	978-4-06-534143-8	November 24, 2026	979-8-88877-755-8
5	July 23, 2024	978-4-06-535955-6	January 26, 2027	979-8-88877-756-5
6	February 21, 2025	978-4-06-538341-4	March 23, 2027	979-888877-757-2

== Reception ==
The series was ranked thirteenth in the 2023 edition of Takarajimasha's Kono Manga ga Sugoi! guidebook of the best manga for female readers. The series was also ranked second at the 1st Late Night Manga Award hosted by Bungeishunjū's Crea magazine in 2022.
