= Ever After (manga) =

Japanese manga series by Ikuno Tajima

- First tankōbon volume cover

アフターメルヘン (Afuta Meruhen)
- Genre: Dark fantasy
- Manga
- Written by: Ikuno Tajima
- Published by: East Press
- English publisher: NA: Aloha Comics
- Magazine: Matogrosso
- Original run: December 22, 2022 – May 23, 2024
- Volumes: 2

Ever After (アフターメルヘン, Afuta Meruhen) is a Japanese manga series written and illustrated by Ikuno Tajima. It was serialized on East Press' Matogrosso website from December 2022 to May 2024, with its chapters compiled into two volumes.

== Synopsis ==
The series focuses on brothers Jacob and Wilhelm, who make a living as scrap collectors, looking after the trash left behind after the ending of certain fairy tales.

== Publication ==
Written and illustrated by Ikuno Tajima, Ever After was serialized on East Press' Matogrosso website from December 22, 2022, to May 23, 2024. Its chapters were compiled into two tankōbon volumes released between December 12, 2023, and August 7, 2024.

In May 2026, Aloha Comics announced that they had licensed the series as their first manga license for English publication.

No.	Original release date	Original ISBN	North American release date	North American ISBN
1	December 12, 2023	978-4-7816-2269-9	October 5, 2026	978-1-6383-8080-1
2	August 7, 2024	978-4-7816-2340-5	—	—

== Reception ==
The series was ranked 11th in the 2025 edition of Takarajimasha's Kono Manga ga Sugoi! guidebook's list of best manga for female readers.
