= Golden Gold =

Japanese manga series

- First tankōbon volume cover

ゴールデンゴールド (Gōruden Gōrudo)
- Genre: Drama; Horror; Supernatural
- Manga
- Written by: Seita Horio
- Published by: Kodansha
- English publisher: NA: Kodansha USA
- Magazine: Morning Two
- Original run: October 22, 2015 – present
- Volumes: 9
- icon

Golden Gold (Japanese: ゴールデンゴールド, Hepburn: Gōruden Gōrudo) is a Japanese manga series written and illustrated by Seita Horio. It has been serialized in Kodansha's seinen manga magazine Morning Two since October 2015.

== Publication ==
Written and illustrated by Seita Horio, Golden Gold started in Kodansha's seinen manga magazine Morning Two on October 22, 2015. The magazine ceased print publication and move to a digital release starting on August 4, 2022. Kodansha has collected its chapters into individual tankōbon volumes. The first volume was released on June 23, 2016. As of November 22, 2021, nine volumes have been released.

In North America, the manga is licensed digitally by Kodansha USA, with the first volume releasing on June 14, 2022.

=== Volumes ===
No.	Original release date	Original ISBN	English release date	English ISBN
1	June 23, 2016	978-4-06-388615-3	June 14, 2022	978-1-68-491188-2
2	January 23, 2017	978-4-06-388689-4	July 19, 2022	978-1-68-491227-8
3	October 23, 2017	978-4-06-510202-2	August 16, 2022	978-1-68-491358-9
4	May 23, 2018	978-4-06-511387-5	September 20, 2022	978-1-68-491395-4
5	December 21, 2018	978-4-06-514055-0	October 18, 2022	978-1-68-491489-0
6	July 23, 2019	978-4-06-516505-8	November 15, 2022	978-1-68-491545-3
7	June 23, 2020	978-4-06-519079-1	December 20, 2022	978-1-68-491594-1
8	February 22, 2021	978-4-06-522117-4	January 17, 2023	978-1-68-491645-0
9	November 22, 2021	978-4-06-524680-1	February 21, 2023	978-1-68-491705-1

== Reception ==
The series ranked first in the August 2016 edition of Takarajimasha's Kono Manga ga Sugoi! Web; the series ranked fifth on Kono Manga ga Sugoi! top 20 manga for male readers. Golden Gold was nominated for the 10th Manga Taishō in 2017 and ranked seventh with 42 points; it was nominated for the 11th edition in 2018 and ranked 12th with 13 points; it was nominated for the 12th edition in 2019 and ranked 12th with 22 points.

== See also ==
- Kokkoku, another manga series by the same author
