= Hon Nara Uru Hodo =

Japanese manga series

- First tankōbon volume cover

本なら売るほど
- Genre: Drama
- Manga
- Written by: Ao Kojima
- Published by: Enterbrain
- Imprint: Harta Comix
- Magazine: Harta
- Original run: September 15, 2023 – present
- Volumes: 3
- icon

Hon Nara Uru Hodo (Japanese: 本なら売るほど; lit. 'Books Aplenty') is a Japanese manga series written and illustrated by Ao Kojima. It was originally published as a one-shot titled Hon o Okuru in Enterbrain's seinen manga magazine Harta in October 2022. It later began serialization in the same magazine in September 2023.

== Synopsis ==
The series is an episodic series centered around a bookstore run by a laid-back young man and his interactions with the customers who come by and visit.

== Publication ==
Written and illustrated by Ao Kojima, Hon Nara Uru Hodo was originally published as a one-shot titled Hon o Okuru (本を葬送る; 'See the Books Off to Their Burial') in Enterbrain's seinen manga magazine Harta on October 15, 2022. It later began serialization in the same magazine on September 15, 2023. Its chapters have been collected in three tankōbon volumes as of April 2026.

No.	Release date	ISBN
1	January 15, 2025	978-4-04-738107-0
2	April 15, 2025	978-4-04-738374-6
3	April 15, 2026	978-4-04-500009-6

== Reception ==
The series was nominated for the 2025 Next Manga Award in the print category. It was ranked fourth in the 4th Crea Late Night Manga Awards in 2025 hosted by Bungeishunjū's Crea magazine. The series topped Da Vinci's 2025 Book of the Year ranking. The series also topped the 2026 edition of Takarajimasha's Kono Manga ga Sugoi! guidebook's list of the best manga for male readers. The series was ranked ninth in Freestyle Magazine's "The Best Manga 2026" ranking in 2025. The series was ranked second in the Nationwide Bookstore Employees' Recommended Comics and topped the Nationwide Publishers Recommended Comics lists of 2026. The series won the 19th Manga Taishō in 2026. The series won the Bookseller Prize at the 2026 EbookJapan Manga Awards. The series won the grand prize in the 30th Tezuka Osamu Cultural Prize in 2026.
