= BL Metamorphosis =

Japanese manga series

- First volume cover, featuring Urara (left) and Yuki (right)

メタモルフォーゼの縁側 (Metamorufōze no Engawa)
- Genre: Slice of life
- Manga
- Written by: Kaori Tsurutani
- Published by: Kadokawa Shoten
- English publisher: NA: Seven Seas Entertainment
- Magazine: Comic Newtype
- Original run: November 17, 2017 – October 9, 2020
- Volumes: 5
- Live-action film
- Directed by: Shunsuke Kariyama
- Produced by: Hidehiro Kawano; Yutaka Tanito; Hiroko Ōgura
- Written by: Yoshikazu Okada
- Released: June 17, 2022

BL Metamorphosis (Japanese: メタモルフォーゼの縁側, Hepburn: Metamorufōze no Engawa; lit. 'Veranda of Metamorphosis') is a Japanese manga series by Kaori Tsurutani. BL Metamorphosis was serialized digitally in the monthly manga magazine Comic Newtype from November 17, 2017, to October 9, 2020. It follows the story of Ichinoi, a 75-year-old woman who discovers a love for Boy's Love manga, and forms an unexpected friendship with Urara, a high school BL fan, as they explore the genre together.

A live-action film adaptation premiered on June 17, 2022.

Since its release, BL Metamorphosis won the New Face Award at the 22nd Japan Media Arts Festival Awards and was nominated for the Manga Taishō in 2019 and 2021.

== Plot ==
Yuki Ichinoi, a 75-year-old woman lonely after the death of her husband, comes across a BL (boys' love) manga in the bookstore one day and buys it out of curiosity. This catches the attention of one of the bookstore clerks, Urara Sayama, a shy 17-year-old high school student and a fujoshi with no friends. As Ichinoi returns to buy more BL manga, the two develop an odd friendship despite their 58-year age difference.

== Characters ==
Yuki Ichinoi (市野井 雪, Ichinoi Yuki)
Portrayed by: Nobuko Miyamoto
Urara Sayama (佐山 うらら, Sayama Urara)
Portrayed by: Mana Ashida

== Media ==
=== Manga ===
BL Metamorphosis is written and illustrated by Kaori Tsurutani. It was serialized digitally on Comic Newtype from November 17, 2017, to October 9, 2020. The chapters were later released in five bound volumes by Kadokawa Shoten.

At Anime Expo 2019, Seven Seas Entertainment announced that they had licensed the series in English for North American distribution.

No.	Original release date	Original ISBN	English release date	English ISBN
1	May 8, 2018	978-4-0410-6830-4	April 28, 2020	978-1-6450-5295-1
2	November 8, 2018	978-4-0410-7350-6	July 28, 2020	978-1-6450-5504-4
3	June 8, 2019	978-4-0410-8224-9	December 22, 2020	978-1-6450-5783-3
4	March 10, 2020	978-4-0410-8841-8	March 30, 2021	978-1-64505-995-0
5	January 9, 2021	978-4-0411-0813-0	September 28, 2021	978-1-6482-7304-9

=== Film ===
A live-action film adaptation was announced in January 2021. The film is directed by Shunsuke Kariyama, with scripts by Yoshikazu Okada, and produced by Hidehiro Kawano, Yutaka Tanito, Hiroko Ōgura. It premiered on June 17, 2022. The film won Best Picture at the 32nd Japanese Movie Critics Awards while Nobuko Miyamoto won the Diamond Award (also titled the Nagaharu Yodogawa Award).

== Reception ==
BL Metamorphosis appeared on the top 50 best manga in the magazine Da Vinci. It was the #1 top-ranked manga in the women's category by Kono Manga ga Sugoi! and was named the #1 Best Manga of 2019 in Kono Manga o Yome!

Publishers Weekly described the series as having an "unhurried pace" and praised the artwork, comparing it to Princess Jellyfish due to its female-centric view on subcultures in Japan. Rebecca Silverman from Anime News Network also praised the story, describing it as a "lovely story of friendship" built on common interests.

=== Awards ===
Year	Award	Category	Result
2018	4th Next Manga Awards	Web Manga	Shortlisted
2019	12th Manga Taishō	Manga Taishō	Nominated
2019	22nd Japan Media Arts Festival Awards	New Face Award	Won
2021	14th Manga Taishō	Manga Taishō	Nominated
