= Ningen Karimenchū =

Japanese manga

人間仮免中
- Genre: Slice of life
- Manga
- Written by: Taeko Uzuki
- Published by: East Press
- Published: May 18, 2012
- Volumes: 1

Ningen Karimenchū (人間仮免中) is a one-volume Japanese slice of life seinen manga written and illustrated by Taeko Uzuki. It was published by East Press on May 18, 2012.

== Characters ==
- Taeko
- Bobby

== Reception ==
It was number three on the 2013 Kono Manga ga Sugoi! Top 20 Manga for Male Readers survey. It was also nominated for the 6th Manga Taishō, receiving 35 points and placing 8th among the eleven nominees.
