= Kokkoku =

Manga series by Seita Horio

- Kokkoku: Moment by Moment
- First tankōbon volume cover

刻刻 (Kokkoku)
- Genre: Mystery; Science fiction; Supernatural thriller
- Manga
- Written by: Seita Horio
- Published by: Kodansha
- English publisher: NA: Kodansha USA (digital)
- Magazine: Monthly Morning Two
- Original run: 22 May 2008 – 22 September 2014
- Volumes: 8
- Anime television series
- Directed by: Yoshimitsu Ōhashi
- Produced by: Makoto Kimura
- Written by: Noboru Kimura
- Music by: Michiru
- Studio: Geno Studio
- Licensed by: BI: Anime Limited; NA: Sentai Filmworks
- Original network: Tokyo MX, BS11
- Original run: 7 January 2018 – 25 March 2018
- Episodes: 12
- icon

Kokkoku: Moment by Moment (Japanese: 刻刻, Hepburn: Kokkoku) is a Japanese dark fantasy manga series written and illustrated by Seita Horio. It was serialized in Kodansha's Monthly Morning Two magazine from May 2008 to September 2015, with its chapters collected into eight tankōbon volumes. The manga tells the story of Juri Yukawa, who during a kidnapping of her nephew and brother, discovered that her grandfather can stop time using a mysterious stone and that they can move freely when time is standing still.

In North America, the manga is licensed by Kodansha USA. A 12-episode anime television series adaptation produced by Geno Studio was broadcast from January to March 2018 on Tokyo MX and BS11. Amazon Video exclusively streamed the series worldwide.

== Story ==
Juri Yukawa is a mischievous young woman, unaware that her family has the secret ability to stop time. When her brother and nephew are suddenly kidnapped by a cult named the "Genuine Love Society", her grandfather uses a special stone that allows her and her father to enter a world called Stasis, where time stands still. As they venture through Stasis to infiltrate the cult's hideout, they meet others who can also move through the mysterious world, as well as the strange grotesque monsters that reside in it. Juri herself will discover the secrets behind the stone and Stasis itself, as they slowly unfold before her.

== Characters ==
Juri Yukawa (佑河 樹里, Yukawa Juri)
Voiced by: Chika Anzai (Japanese); Amber Lee Connors (English)
An unemployed young woman who has failed 19 job interviews in a row, struggling to stay positive as her family is breaking down. She discovers that she has the power to expel Specters from the bodies of those who can move through Stasis by simply slamming them with the palm of her hand.
Shoko Majima (間島 翔子, Majima Shōko)
Voiced by: Asami Seto (Japanese); Marissa Lenti (English)
A mysterious woman who has led several members of the Genuine Love Society into Stasis, but secretly harbors her own plans to find her missing family.
Grandfather (じいさん, Jii-san)
Voiced by: Kazuhiro Yamaji (Japanese); Carl Masterson (English)
Juri's grandfather who holds the original magic stone that allows himself and anyone nearby to merge with Specters and travel through Stasis. He can also teleport himself and anyone he touches, but only in short distances.
Junji Sagawa (佐河 順治, Sagawa Junji)
Voiced by: Hozumi Goda (Japanese); Luis Galindo, Howard Wang (teen), Katelyn Barr (child), Kalin Coates (baby) (English)
The leader of the Genuine Love Society who seeks to learn everything he can about the world of Stasis to use it for his own ends.
Takafumi Yukawa (佑河 貴文, Yukawa Takafumi)
Voiced by: Koji Tsujitani (Japanese); John Swasey (English)
Juri's slovenly father who was recently laid off from his job.
Tsubasa Yukawa (佑河 翼, Yukawa Tsubasa)
Voiced by: Hirofumi Nojima (Japanese); Josh Grelle (English)
Juri's brother and a NEET who wastes his days playing video games at home. Ends up getting kidnapped while bringing Makoto home from kindergarten. In Stasis, he decides to take care of Makoto so the boy won't follow the same path he did.
Makoto Yukawa (佑河 真, Yukawa Makoto)
Voiced by: Ryuto Iwata (Japanese); Kalin Coates (English)
An innocent young boy and the nephew of Juri and Tsubasa. Later revealed to be able to control the Handlers with his mind.
Shiomi (潮見)
Voiced by: Yuya Uchida (Japanese); Clint Bickham (English)
Junji's right-hand man.
Sako (迫)
Voiced by: Hiroyuki Yoshino (Japanese); Scott Gibbs (English)
One of the henchmen for the Genuine Love Society who decides to stick with Shoko. Unlike the other members of the cult, he is only there to do a job and does not follow Sagawa's beliefs.
Yosuke Majima (間島 洋介, Majima Yōsuke)
Voiced by: Savanna Menzel (English)
Shoko's younger brother, who became a Handler 17 years ago. When he and his parents were rescued, he is the only one who survived.

== Media ==
=== Manga ===
Written and illustrated by Seita Horio, Kokkoku: Moment by Moment was serialized in Kodansha's Monthly Morning Two magazine from 22 May 2008 to 22 September 2014. Kodansha collected its chapters into eight tankōbon volumes, released from 21 August 2009 to 23 October 2014.

Kodansha USA has licensed the manga in North America for digital release.

==== Volumes ====
No.	Original release date	Original ISBN	English release date	English ISBN
1	21 August 2009	978-4-06-372822-4	10 October 2017	978-1-68-233902-2
2	21 August 2009	978-4-06-372823-1	14 November 2017	978-1-68-233903-9
3	23 August 2010	978-4-06-372924-5	12 December 2017	978-1-68-233984-8
4	22 April 2011	978-4-06-372999-3	9 January 2018	978-1-64-212019-6
5	23 March 2012	978-4-06-387092-3	13 February 2018	978-1-64-212118-6
6	22 March 2013	978-4-06-387197-5	13 March 2018	978-1-64-212163-6
7	22 November 2013	978-4-06-387249-1	24 April 2018	978-1-64-212232-9
8	23 October 2014	978-4-06-388354-1	24 July 2018	978-1-64-212407-1

=== Anime ===
An anime television series adaptation by Geno Studio was announced to be in development as one of the studio's three major anime projects in October 2017. It is directed by Yoshimitsu Ohashi and written by Noboru Kimura, with character designs by Yasuomi Umetsu. The anime ran on the Tokyo MX and BS11 stations in Japan from 7 January to 25 March 2018. The opening theme song is "Flashback" performed by MIYAVI Vs KenKen, and the ending theme song is "Asayake to Nettaigyo" (朝焼けと熱帯魚, Sunrise and Tropical Fish) by Boku no Lyric no Boyomi.

Amazon Video exclusively streamed the series worldwide. Sentai Filmworks have licensed the series for a home video release with an English dub on 16 April 2019. Anime Limited acquired the series for distribution in the United Kingdom and Ireland.

==== Episodes ====
No.	Title (Note: All English episode titles are taken from Amazon Video.)	Original air date
1	"The First Moment"; Transliteration: "Dai-Ikkoku" (Japanese: 㐧壱刻)	7 January 2018
Juri Yukawa fails her 19th job interview and comes home reflecting on the family's bad employment situation. Later that day, men belonging to a cult called the Genuine Love Society kidnap her brother Tsubasa and her nephew Makoto. The kidnappers call Juri demanding that they pay a ransom of 5 million yen in 30 minutes or else Tsubasa and Makoto are killed. Unable to get the money in time, Juri's grandfather brings out a special stone that freezes time while allowing himself, Juri, and Juri's father Takafumi to move freely in the still world called Stasis. They arrive at the site where Tsubasa and Makoto are being held captive to rescue them. However, the three are surprised to find out that they are not the only ones who can move in Stasis as a bunch of men arrive to ambush them while one of them attempts to kill Makoto. A giant monster suddenly appears in front of everybody at the hideout.
2	"The Second Moment"; Transliteration: "Dai-Nikoku" (Japanese: 㐧弐刻)	14 January 2018
The monster, called a Handler, kills the cult member who attempted to kill the motionless Makoto. Grandfather uses his teleportation powers to get himself and Juri out of danger, while Takafumi gets captured. A group of cultist led by Shoko Majima are ordered to capture Grandfather. Having escaped the pursuers, Juri decides to learn how to teleport, but is unable to do so. Having decided to redo the time freeze, Grandfather heads to the hideout to find answers as to how those men were able to move in Stasis, while Juri heads home to get the stone. Meanwhile, Tsubasa is able to move and he helps out a still-frozen Makoto. Grandfather arrives at the hideout and learns that the cult had been spying on the family and was waiting for them to enter the Stasis. Meanwhile, Juri returns home and gets ambushed by cultists after finding out that they had taken the stone.
3	"The Third Moment"; Transliteration: "Dai-Sankoku" (Japanese: 㐧参刻)	21 January 2018
Juri awakens her hidden power that can freeze those who can move in Stasis by expelling their Specter, a lifeform that grants those with the ability to move in Statis. Juri uses the power to take back the stone and escape. Meanwhile, a Handler comes to kill a cultist who was about to murder a man, while Majima orders her men to capture Juri alive. Makoto gets a Specter and is able to move in Stasis, and he goes around being curious about the still world. Juri and Grandfather are pursued by cult members who are fully aware of the latter's teleportation ability, but the two manage to get away. They walk together in the middle of the road so that they would have time to react should they get spotted by the cult. However a cult member posing as one of the stalled humans launches a surprise attack on Juri.
4	"The Fourth Moment"; Transliteration: "Dai-Yonkoku" (Japanese: 㐧肆刻)	28 January 2018
The cult member is intercepted by Grandfather and Juri expels his Specter to freeze him. Grandfather recalls the time he became aware of Juri's ability as 17 years ago, Juri inadvertently used the same power on him and was nearly frozen from it. The two are pursued by more cultists, and unable to teleport away from them, Juri uses her power to make them motionless. The two head to the hideout to get Tsubasa and Makoto, but find them missing unaware that they escaped as the result of being given Specters. Meanwhile, a Handler kills one of the cultists for attempting to kill a motionless person in front of Majima and she sees it collapse. Majima finds out that a Handler, called a Herald by the cult, has a dead corpse inside it.
5	"The Fifth Moment"; Transliteration: "Dai-Gokoku" (Japanese: 㐧伍刻)	4 February 2018
17 years ago, Majima and her family entered the Stasis able to move. Her brother and parents all became Handlers, while she encountered Juri, who expelled her Specter to save her from becoming a Handler. This made her join the cult so that she could get Juri to use that power again that could bring back her family. Back in the hideout, Juri and Grandfather arrive and Juri uses her power in front of Majima. The two rescue Takafumi, but he is hesitant to go with them, while the cult decides to try and murder a motionless man with various degree of intent to determine the threshold for when a Handler takes action. The Handler appears, Majima sees that it is her mother that is inside it. Along the way, Juri warns Tsubasa and Makoto not to stay at the house having written a note, but after those two arrived at home, a cultist had removed the letter and attacks the two knowing that Handlers do not take action against those killing a moving person. Tsubasa takes on the cultist and gets stabbed in order to allow Makoto to get away.
6	"The Sixth Moment"; Transliteration: "Dai-Rokkoku" (Japanese: 㐧陸刻)	11 February 2018
Despite the stab wound, Tsubasa manages to defeat the cultist and escape. Shortly afterwards he starts to transform into a Handler. Juri arrives just in time to expel his Specter before his transformation is complete and Tsubasa becomes motionless. Takafumi expresses his displeasure for being rescued claiming that he was trying to be a spy. Makoto is kidnapped by Majima's partner Sako, and Majima approaches Juri asking her to use her power on the Handler, which Juri agrees to do despite disapproving of her actions. Majima tries to kill a motionless man to draw the Handler, but her murderous intent was too weak to draw it out. After Takafumi quietly builds up his murderous intent, the Handler arrives to kill Takafumi. Juri expels the Specters after a long struggle to save Takafumi, and the corpses of Majima's family come out. Majima expresses her gratitude towards her dead parents for recognizing her for a moment, however her brother Yosuke is still alive.
7	"The Seventh Moment"; Transliteration: "Dai-Nanakoku" (Japanese: 㐧漆刻)	18 February 2018
With Yosuke alive, he is put on a truck headed for the hospital alongside his dead parents. Having resolved Majima's conflict, Juri decides to destroy the stone as soon as they exit Stasis after learning about the tragedy that befell the Majima family, but without Takafumi knowing about the plan. To do that, Juri must expel the Specters from all cult members still able to move in Stasis, with Majima and Sako, not being cult disciples, cutting ties with the cult to help her out. Meanwhile, cult leader Junji Sagawa explains that the Stasis power is tied to bloodlines, while telling his disciples that he intends to harness the power of Stasis to live as long as he can, leading to a moral divide within the cult. Juri expels the Specter out of one of the disciples, while another of the disciples finds the stone that was hidden on a tree, and Sagawa begins the process of transforming into a Handler.
8	"The Eighth Moment"; Transliteration: "Dai-Hachikoku" (Japanese: 㐧捌刻)	25 February 2018
In his final sermon, Sagawa tells his disciples that he has mastered the power of the Handlers. Sagawa transforms into a Handler, but unlike the other Handlers he harnesses its powers while maintaining full control of his body. Sagawa then starts killing his disciples, while one of them attempts to kill Tsubasa before Juri arrives to expel his Specter. Sagawa tries to kill Juri, but Grandfather teleports her out of danger. Meanwhile, Takafumi tricks Makoto into thinking that he paid for a toy when in truth he was shoplifting as he does not want to exit the Stasis. Majima approaches Sagawa's most loyal disciple Shiomi trying to help Juri's cause, but declines out of fear for his safety. Majima encounters Sagawa again and she gets cornered, and then Juri and Grandfather arrive to save her. Shiomi arrives and slashes Grandfather's hand to collect his blood. Shiomi puts a drop of his blood in the stone and Grandfather experiences great pain as he is about to become motionless.
9	"The Ninth Moment"; Transliteration: "Dai-Kyukoku" (Japanese: 㐧玖刻)	4 March 2018
With his last bit of strength before becoming one of the stalled, Grandfather teleports with Juri to the stone's location. Juri smashes the stone to stop Grandfather from becoming motionless, but by doing so their means of exiting Stasis is gone. Sagawa attacks, and due to the stone being destroyed, Shiomi decides to betray Sagawa and help Juri and Grandfather escape. Majima mentions that there is another way to leave the Stasis by expelling everybody's Specters, but Juri would remain trapped in Stasis. Shiomi tells everybody what Sagawa's goal is, to see the world far into the future, and because he is killing people to achieve this goal that he must be stopped. Meanwhile, a Handler attacks Takafumi but Makoto is able to stop it as he awakens his power to communicate with Handlers. Juri and company arrive to witness his power and the Handler is revealed to be Tobino, one of the cult members that Sagawa killed after his final sermon. Everybody realizes that with Makoto's powers that they now have the Handlers fighting on their side.
10	"The Tenth Moment"; Transliteration: "Dai-Jukkoku" (Japanese: 㐧拾刻)	11 March 2018
With everybody mistakenly thinking that Takafumi, and not Makoto, controls the Handler that he takes advantage of the situation to clear his name. He insists that Makoto be kept safe, but he needs to be able to see the Handler to control the power. Juri and company launch an attack on Sagawa using Tobino to distract him while Juri expels his Specter, but is unable to do so. However, Sagawa exhausts his power and loses his human form and retreats. Juri and Grandfather track him down at the house where Sagawa proposes a way for everybody to make it out of Stasis, but Juri is highly skeptical. Sagawa explains his backstory as he was a Shinto priest training to succeed his father and had lived a sheltered life. He did not have many friends, but he had a close friend. One day, the two of them caught Sagawa's father and his friend's mother having a sexual affair, which led Sagawa to condemning his father and eventually lead to the creation of the Genuine Love Society.
11	"The Eleventh Moment"; Transliteration: "Dai-Jū-Ikkoku" (Japanese: 㐧拾壱刻)	18 March 2018
Sagawa concludes his backstory saying that he found out about the Stasis stone when his father died five years after the incident. After hearing his story, Juri goes through with her intended course of action by expelling his Specter, but her power has no effect on him leading her to kill him. Not wanting Juri to be burdened by killing someone Grandfather tries to kill him, but his will is too weak and Takafumi suddenly appears to kill him. Sagawa's body dissolves leaving only his brain, and it shoots out threads that cuts Takafumi's fingers. Juri expels Takafumi's Specter to prevent blood loss, and then Makoto's out of obligation to protecting him. While observing the threads, Shiomi figures out that they are used for nourishment and are made of Specters. Juri uses her power to cut the threads leading to Sagawa starving to death. Afterwards, Sagawa is reborn as a baby.
12	"The Twelfth Moment"; Transliteration: "Dai-Ju-Nikoku" (Japanese: 㐧拾弐刻)	25 March 2018
Confident that Sagawa's memories will not return, Juri decides to raise him as her son. Juri sends all remaining inhabitants out of Stasis except Sagawa and Grandfather. Juri intends to raise him in the Stasis until he is mature enough to handle himself in the real world. After helping Juri raise Sagawa for a while, Grandfather is sent out of Stasis leaving just Juri and Sagawa. After a half a year passes in the Stasis, Sagawa is sent back when he was on the verge of vomiting not wanting to risk having him choke. As time passes in the Stasis for Juri, she begins to break down mentally and begins her transformation into a Handler. However, she was saved when she has a chance encounter with the wife of the stone's creator that died in 1880. The creator's wife, who is the original founder of the Stasis, returns Juri to the real world and reunites with her family. Years later since that fateful day, Sagawa has grown and treasures his new family.

== See also ==
- Golden Gold, another manga series by the same author
