= Space Brothers (manga) =

Japanese manga series

- First tankōbon volume cover, featuring Mutta (left) and Hibito Nanba (right)

宇宙兄弟 (Uchū Kyōdai)
- Genre: Drama; Science fiction; Slice of life
- Manga
- Written by: Chūya Koyama
- Published by: Kodansha
- English publisher: NA: Kodansha USA
- Imprint: Morning KC
- Magazine: Morning
- Original run: December 6, 2007 – June 11, 2026
- Volumes: 46
- Anime television series
- Directed by: Ayumu Watanabe
- Written by: Makoto Uezu (1–20); Yoichi Kato (21–99)
- Music by: Toshiyuki Watanabe
- Studio: A-1 Pictures
- Licensed by: NA: Sentai Filmworks
- Original network: NNS (ytv, NTV)
- Original run: April 1, 2012 – March 22, 2014
- Episodes: 99
- Live-action film
- Directed by: Yoshitaka Mori
- Produced by: Kenzo Abe
- Written by: Mika Ohmori
- Music by: Takayuki Hattori
- Studio: Toho
- Released: May 5, 2012
- Runtime: 129 minutes
- Anime film

Space Brothers #0
- Directed by: Ayumu Watanabe
- Written by: Chūya Koyama
- Music by: Toshiyuki Watanabe
- Studio: A-1 Pictures
- Licensed by: NA: Sentai Filmworks
- Released: August 9, 2014
- Runtime: 90 minutes
- icon

Space Brothers (Japanese: 宇宙兄弟, Hepburn: Uchū Kyōdai) is a Japanese manga series written and illustrated by Chūya Koyama. It was serialized in Kodansha's seinen manga magazine Morning from December 2007 to June 2026, with its chapters collected in 46 tankōbon volumes. A 99-episode anime television series adaptation by A-1 Pictures aired from April 2012 to March 2014. The manga was also adapted into a live-action film that premiered in May 2012. An anime film, Space Brothers #0, premiered in August 2014.

By June 2026, the manga had over 35 million copies in circulation. In 2011, Space Brothers won the general category at both the 56th Shogakukan Manga Award and the 35th Kodansha Manga Award.

== Story ==
In the summer of 2006, Mutta Nanba and his younger brother, Hibito, witness what they believe to be a UFO, which flies off towards the Moon. Hibito decides he will go onto the Moon whilst Mutta decides he will aim for Mars. Nineteen years later, in the year 2025, Hibito has become a fully fledged JAXA astronaut assigned to go on a mission towards the moon. Mutta, on the other hand, has not been so successful in achieving his dreams. As Mutta eventually recalls his past ambitions, he receives a letter stating he has been accepted to join a JAXA training program for new astronauts. The series follows Mutta as he seeks to become an astronaut and achieve his longtime dream just like his brother did.

== Media ==
=== Manga ===
Space Brothers, written and illustrated by Chūya Koyama, was serialized in Kodansha's seinen manga magazine Morning from December 6, 2007, to June 11, 2026. Kodansha collected its chapters in 46 tankōbon volumes, released from March 21, 2008, to July 22, 2026.

The manga is available in digital form in North America and Europe from ComiXology and Amazon in both volume and SimulPub chapter format. It was previously also available in English as part of a read-only subscription from Crunchyroll and Kodansha USA.

=== Anime ===
A 99-episode anime television series adaptation by A-1 Pictures aired on Yomiuri TV from April 1, 2012, to March 22, 2014. It was simulcast by Crunchyroll. The series is licensed by Sentai Filmworks in North America. The 31st episode, which aired on November 4, 2012, features the first piece of voice acting to be recorded in space, performed by astronaut Akihiko Hoshide aboard the International Space Station. A special episode titled "Planetarium: Space Brothers: One Point of Light" (プラネタリウム 宇宙兄弟～一点のひかり～, Puranetariumu Uchū Kyōdai Itten no Hikari) was screened in planetariums during Summer 2012 and was released on DVD with the 20th manga volume on February 22, 2013. In January 2024, Koyama stated that the anime is planned to continue after the manga ends.

==== Music ====
Opening themes

1. "Feel So Moon" by Unicorn (episodes 1–13)
2. "Eureka" (ユリーカ, Yurīka) by Sukima Switch (episodes 14–26)
3. "Yumemiru Sekai" (夢見る世界; lit. "Dream-like World") by Does (episodes 27–38)
4. "Small World" by Fujifabric (episodes 39–51)
5. "Kienai E" (消えない絵; lit. "Non-Disappearing Drawing") by Magokoro Brothers (episodes 52–64)
6. "Crater" (クレーター, Kurētā) by Merengue (episodes 65–75)
7. "HALO" by tacica (episodes 76–87)
8. "B.B." by THE Yatou (episodes 88–99)

Ending themes

1. "Subarashiki Sekai" (素晴らしき世界; lit. "This Wonderful World") by Rake (episodes 1–13)
2. "Kokuhaku" (告白; lit. "Confession") by Angela Aki (episodes 14–26)
3. "Tete" (テテ; lit. "Hands") by Akihisa Kondō (episodes 27–38)
4. "Goodbye Issac" (グッバイ・アイザック, Gubbai Aizakku) by Motohiro Hata (episodes 39–51)
5. "Beyond" by Miho Fukuhara (episodes 52–64)
6. "Yozora no Taiyō" (夜空の太陽; lit. "Sun in the Night Sky") by Flower Companyz (episodes 65–75)
7. "New World" by Kasarinchu (episodes 76–87)
8. "Anata ga Ireba OK!" by Serena (episodes 88–99)

=== Films ===
==== Live action film ====
A live-action film adaptation of Space Brothers was produced by Toho and released in Japanese theatres on May 5, 2012, later being screened at the Japanese Film Festival in Australia later that year. The adaptation was written by Koyama and directed by Yoshitaka Mori, with Shun Oguri and Masaki Okada playing the roles of Mutta and Hibito respectively. Real life astronaut Buzz Aldrin plays a cameo in the film as himself. The theme song for the film is British alternative rock band Coldplay's "Every Teardrop Is a Waterfall" from their album Mylo Xyloto. The film won the "Best of Puchon" and "NH Nonghyup Citizen's Choice" awards at the 16th Puchon International Fantastic Film Festival.

==== Anime film ====
A prequel anime film titled Space Brothers #0 (Uchū Kyōdai #0 in Japanese) was released in Japanese theaters on August 9, 2014. Koyama wrote the script for the film.

== Reception ==
By June 2026, the manga had over 35 million copies in circulation.

Allen Moody of THEM Anime Reviews awarded the anime series 4 stars out of 5, writing: "The stupidity of the accidents, the padding, the racism (intentional or no), the weak attempts at humor, and some annoying traits of the lead combined to make me subtract one star from what is otherwise yes, a genuine epic, and often a solid drama as well." The first part of the show, up to episode 51, also received several reviews from the Anime News Network, where it received B+ and B scores, with reviews calling the show "consistently fun and successfully sentimental" and praising it for its "hearteningly optimistic" style, "grown-up tale of pursuing dreams", "attention to technological and scientific detail"; and "great cast", while criticizing the stretched plot, particularly the overly long training arcs.

In The Encyclopedia of Science Fiction, the series is described as "a celebratory chronicle of "ordinary" people achieving extraordinary dreams, and likely the longest, most uplifting and realistically detailed work about near-future space exploration ever made."

=== Awards and nominations ===
Space Brothers has been nominated twice for the Manga Taishō, in 2009 and 2010. In 2011, it won the award for best general manga at the 56th Shogakukan Manga Awards and at the Kodansha Manga Award (shared with Chica Umino's March Comes In Like a Lion). In 2014, it won the Reader Prize of the 18th Tezuka Osamu Cultural Prize.

In 2024, alongside Detective Conan, Space Brothers won the grand prize of Rakuten Kobo's second E-book Award in the "Long Seller Comic" category.
