= Chūya Koyama =

Japanese writer (born 1978)

Chūya Koyama (小山 宙哉, Koyama Chūya; born 30 September 1978) is a Japanese writer, best known for his Space Brothers series, published regularly from 2007 to 2026.

On 2 November 2016 his artwork was carried into space by the H-IIA rocket carrying the Himawari-9 weather satellite as part of an outreach project organized by the Young Astronauts Club Japan.
