= Da Vinci (magazine) =

Japanese pop culture magazine

- Cover of Da Vinci Magazine (January 2021 issue)
- Categories: Literary magazine
- Frequency: Monthly
- Publisher: Recruit (1994–1998); Media Factory (1998–present)
- First issue: 1994
- Final issue: 2026
- Country: Japan
- Language: Japanese
- Website: ddnavi.com

Da Vinci (ダ・ヴィンチ, Da Vinci) was a monthly magazine about books published by Media Factory, launched in 1994 by Recruit. The first publisher was Yoshio Kimura, the editor-in-chief was Yasuhiro Nagazono, and the art director was Toshiaki Ichikawa.

== Overview ==
Da Vinci is a book information magazine that introduces new publications, popular books and comics. The magazine also features essays by famous people, reader-submitted columns, questionnaires, special features on the relationship between the world and books from a new perspective, and a wide range of information on new paperbacks, new books, and new comics. It also includes information on approaching authors for book signings.

- Although it is a literary magazine, it is subculture-oriented, actively introducing not only general novels but also manga and light novels.
- The covers are mainly modeled after popular young actors, musicians, and celebrities, each holding the book they like best.
- It is the magazine that created the manga essay genre. The magazine selected Haruko Ohtagaki and Saori Oguri, who were not yet on the scene, to create a bestseller, and "Manga Essay Theater" was born from that.

Da Vinci was previously owned by Media Factory. Kadokawa has acquired Media Factory since then. In May 2026, it was announced that the magazine would end publication after 32 years, finishing with its November issue, released on October 6, 2026.

== Da Vinci Literature Award ==
The Da Vinci Prize for Literature was a newcomer's literary prize offered by Media Factory's (now KADOKAWA) magazine Da Vinci, accepting novels of 100 to 200 pages in 400-character manuscript paper. Any genre of work was acceptable. The winner received a cash prize of one million yen, and the winning work (or a collection of works including the winning work) was published by Media Factory (now KADOKAWA) .

Other than the Grand Prize, the cash prizes were 200,000 yen for the Excellence Award and Reader's Award, and 100,000 yen for the Editor-in-Chief's Special Award.

The contest ended with the 7th edition in 2012, and the Da Vinci "Story of Books" Grand Prize was established as the successor prize, limiting the content to "stories related to books.

Year	Award	Award-winning work	Author
2006	Grand Prize	Yo-chan's Night.	Azusa Maekawa
2006	Excellence Award	Go, HOME	Tachibana Natsumizu
2006	Excellence Award	But Beautiful	Mahiro Sawaki
2006	Editor's Special Prize	POKKA POKKA	Mitsuru Nakagawa
2007	Grand Prize	rabbit bread	Asako Takiwa
2007	Excellence Award	Yamashita Batting Center	Atsushi Sogabe
2007	Editor's Special Prize	FISH IN THE SKY	Ao Okamoto
2008	Grand Prize	Map man	Junjo Shindo
2008	Readers' Choice Award	Morning glory morning	Ririko Tono
2008	Editor's Special Prize	Yoshino Kita High School Library Committee	Nagisa Yamamoto
2009	Grand Prize	Burdock Kiyoko's Cat Soul	Kaeruko Akeno
2010	Grand Prize	N/A	N/A
2010	Readers' Choice Award	Get married	Tomonori Satonaka
2011	Grand Prize	Laugh	Mizuo Kudo
2012	Grand Prize	N/A	N/A

=== Da Vinci "Book Story" Grand Prize ===
The Da Vinci "Book Story" Grand Prize (Da Vinci Real Story) is the successor to the Da Vinci Literature Award, which ended with the 7th edition in 2012. It launched in 2013, The prize is limited to "stories related to books," and invites entries of 250 to 350 pages of 400-character manuscript paper. The winner will receive a cash prize of one million yen, and the winning story will be published by Media Factory (now KADOKAWA).There are also prizes for excellence, readers' prizes, and special prizes. The final selection is made not only by the editorial department, but also by 100 readers' judges and bookstore staff, making it a unique literary award in its selection method.

Year	Award	Award-winning work	Author
2013	Grand Prize	First love goes beyond the slope	Namiya Fujiishi
2013	Readers' Choice Award	Iware Kita	Yanagasawa Kada
2014	Grand Prize	Bookstore with God Mahoroba no Natsu	Senya Mihagi
2015	Grand Prize	N/A	N/A

== Book of the Year Award ==
The "Da Vinci" Book of the Year is an annual ranking that started in 2001. The ranking is not simply based on sales order, but on the votes of "book connoisseurs" such as book critics, bookstore employees, Da Vinci survey members, and reading meter users from all over Japan.

#	Year	Recipient	Ref.
10	2010	1Q84 by Haruki Murakami (overall)	
11	2011	Hospitality Department by Hiro Arikawa (overall)	
12	2012	Flying Public Relations Office by Hiro Arikawa (novel category); Silver Spoon by Hiromu Arakawa (male-oriented comic category); Chihayafuru by Yuki Suetsugu (female-oriented comic category)	
13	2013	The Twelve Kingdoms by Fuyumi Ono (novel category); Attack on Titan by Hajime Isayama (comic category)	
14	2014	Masquerade Eve by Keigo Higashino (novel category); Masquerade Hotel by Keigo Higashino (paperback category); Attack on Titan by Hajime Isayama (comic category)	
15	2015	Spark by Naoki Matayoshi (novel category); The Great Passage by Shion Miura (paperback category); March Comes In like a Lion by Chica Umino (comic category)	
16	2016	Your Name by Makoto Shinkai (novel category); Rage by Shuichi Yoshida (paperback category); March Comes In like a Lion by Chica Umino (comic category)	
17	2017	Lonely Castle in the Mirror by Mizuki Tsujimura (novel category); Spark by Naoki Matayoshi (paperback category); March Comes In like a Lion by Chica Umino (comic category)	
18	2018	Downtown Rocket: Ghost by Jun Ikeido (novel category); A Forest of Wool and Steel by Natsu Miyashita (paperback category); Case Closed by Gosho Aoyama (comic category)	
19	2019	Kingdom by Yasuhisa Hara (comic category)	
20	2020	Demon Slayer: Kimetsu no Yaiba by Koyoharu Gotouge (comic category)	
21	2021	Demon Slayer: Kimetsu no Yaiba by Koyoharu Gotouge (comic category)	
22	2022	Spy × Family by Tatsuya Endo (comic category)	
23	2023	Ikoku Nikki (comic category)	
24	2024	Jujutsu Kaisen by Gege Akutami (comic category)	
25	2025	Hon Nara Uru Hodo by Ao Kojima (comic category)	

== Da Vinci E-book Award ==
The Da Vinci Electronic Book Award (Da Vinci Densho Seitaisho) is a media award for electronic books established in 2011 by Media Factory Inc. (now KADOKAWA)

Since 2012, it has been known as the E-Book Award. All e-book titles distributed during the last year are eligible. The grand prize winner will receive a cash prize of one million yen.

The e-book awards are given to e-books and e-comics in all genres except for adult titles distributed in the previous year, and are based on an original bestseller ranking based on annual sales data from 21 e-bookstores. This year's awards are the fourth in the series. This year marks the fourth time it has been held. The aim is to keep e-books boom from declining hence a bestseller award. It stopped after 2014.

Selection method: Original best seller from annual sales data of e-bookstores' aggregate rankings. The readers prize is based on readers' vote.

Year	Grand Prize	Literature Award	Book Award	Manga Award	Special Award	Readers' Prize
2011	Marriage of Nukaka	Singing Whale	Elemental Picture Book	Sennen Gaho	Appropriate Diary	Mom, read! Otoehon before good night-reading Japanese folk tales-
2012	Ichiro Interviews	Shuntaro Tanikawa's" Tanigawa	panologue vol.0	Piyo-chan's Friend	Our Manga	Introduction to Men's Style

Year	Grand Prize	Novel Award	Manga Award	Light Novel award	Culture award	Hobbies Award	Business Award
2013	Space Brothers	Reiko Himekawa Series	Space Brothers	Campione	Is that so! Modern history	A Woman Doctor's Guide to Real, Pleasant Sex	Steve Jobs (I & II)
2014	Attack on Titan	Our Bubble Group	Attack on Titan	The Devil Is a Part-Timer!	Statistics is the strongest study	The magic of tidying up life	Zero I will add a small one to myself who has nothing
