= Kono Manga ga Sugoi! =

Japanese annual reference mook series

- Cover of the 2008 edition, the first to combine manga for men and women together
- Original title: このマンガがすごい!
- Country: Japan
- Language: Japanese
- Discipline: Reference mook
- Publisher: Takarajimasha
- Published: 2005–present
- Media type: Print
- No. of books: 18
- Website: Official website

Kono Manga ga Sugoi! (このマンガがすごい!; "This Manga Is Amazing!") is an annual reference mook series published by Takarajimasha since 2005 featuring yearly rankings and reviews of manga. The rankings are compiled by surveying professionals in the manga and publishing industry. The first two years saw two separate versions of Kono Manga ga Sugoi! published; one covering manga for men, and one covering manga for women. Since 2007, only one book covering both demographics together has been published. The series is part of Takarajimasha's other mook series, including Kono Eiga ga Sugoi!, which focuses on film; Kono Mystery ga Sugoi!, which focuses on mystery novels; and Kono Light Novel ga Sugoi!, which focuses on light novels.

== Publications ==
- Kono Manga ga Sugoi! 2006 Men ver. (December 1, 2005, ISBN 4796650172)
- Kono Manga ga Sugoi! 2006 Women ver. (December 1, 2005, ISBN 4796650199)
- Kono Manga ga Sugoi! 2007 Men ver. (December 5, 2006, ISBN 4796655670)
- Kono Manga ga Sugoi! 2007 Women ver. (December 5, 2006, ISBN 4796655697)
- Kono Manga ga Sugoi! 2008 (December 4, 2007, ISBN 978-4796661416)
- Kono Manga ga Sugoi! Side B (August 8, 2008, ISBN 978-4796664653)
- Kono Manga ga Sugoi! 2009 (December 5, 2008, ISBN 978-4796667173)
- Kono Manga ga Sugoi! 2010 (December 10, 2009, ISBN 978-4796675154)
- Kono Manga ga Sugoi! 2011 (December 10, 2010, ISBN 978-4796679602)
- Kono Manga ga Sugoi! 2012 (December 10, 2011, ISBN 978-4796688321)
- Kono Manga ga Sugoi! 2013 (December 10, 2012, ISBN 978-4800204516)
- Kono Manga ga Sugoi! 2014 (December 9, 2013, ISBN 978-4800219817)
- Kono Manga ga Sugoi! 2015 (December 10, 2014, ISBN 978-4800235824)
- Kono Manga ga Sugoi! 2016 (December 10, 2015, ISBN 978-4800247315)
- Kono Manga ga Sugoi! 2017 (December 10, 2016, ISBN 978-4800264497)
- Kono Manga ga Sugoi! 2018 (December 9, 2017, ISBN 978-4800278319)
- Kono Manga ga Sugoi! 2019 (December 11, 2018, ISBN 978-4800290014)
- Kono Manga ga Sugoi! 2020 (December 11, 2019, ISBN 978-4299000897)
- Kono Manga ga Sugoi! 2021 (December 14, 2020, ISBN 978-4299012029)
- Kono Manga ga Sugoi! 2022 (December 9, 2021, ISBN 978-4299023896)
- Kono Manga ga Sugoi! 2023 (December 14, 2022, ISBN 978-4299037374)
- Kono Manga ga Sugoi! 2024 (December 11, 2023, ISBN 978-4299049391)
- Kono Manga ga Sugoi! 2025 (December 13, 2024, ISBN 978-4299062765)
- Kono Manga ga Sugoi! 2026 (December 15, 2025, ISBN 978-4299074850)

== Top ranking manga of the year ==
Year	Men ver.	Women ver.
2006	Pluto by Naoki Urasawa	Honey and Clover by Chica Umino
2007	Detroit Metal City by Kiminori Wakasugi	Honey and Clover by Chica Umino
2008	81diver by Yokusaru Shibata	Kimi ni Todoke by Karuho Shiina
2009	Saint Young Men by Hikaru Nakamura	Kids on the Slope by Yuki Kodama
2010	Bakuman by Tsugumi Ohba and Takeshi Obata	Chihayafuru by Yuki Suetsugu
2011	Attack on Titan by Hajime Isayama	Her by Tomoko Yamashita
2012	Black Jack Sosaku Hiwa: Tezuka Osamu no Oshigoto Bakara by Masaru Miyazaki and Koji Yamamoto	Hana no Zubora-Meshi by Masayuki Kusumi and Etsuko Mizusawa
2013	Terra Formars by Yū Sasuga and Michio Fukuda	My Love Story!! by Kazune Kawahara and Aruko
2014	Assassination Classroom by Yūsei Matsui	Sayonara Sorcier by Hozumi
2015	A Silent Voice by Yoshitoki Ōima	Chi-chan wa Chotto Tarinai by Tomomi Abe
2016	Delicious in Dungeon by Ryoko Kui	Wotakoi: Love Is Hard for Otaku by Fujita
2017	Mr. Tonegawa: Middle Management Blues by Tensei Hagiwara, Tomohiro Hashimoto, and Tomoki Miyoshi	Gold Kingdom and Water Kingdom by Nao Iwamoto
2018	The Promised Neverland by Kaiu Shirai and Posuka Demizu	The Seven Knights of the Marronnier Kingdom by Nao Iwamoto
2019	Heavenly Delusion by Masakazu Ishiguro	BL Metamorphosis by Kaori Tsurutani
2020	Spy × Family by Tatsuya Endo	Not Your Idol by Aoi Makino
2021	Chainsaw Man by Tatsuki Fujimoto	Onna no Sono no Hoshi by Yama Wayama
2022	Look Back by Tatsuki Fujimoto	The Credits Roll into the Sea by John Tarachine
2023	The Summer Hikaru Died by Mokumokuren	A Witch's Life in Mongol by Tomato Soup
2024	The Days of Diamond by Ōhashi Hirai	Umibe no Stove: Ōshiro Kogani Tanpenshū by Kogani Ōshiro
2025	Spacewalking with You by Inuhiko Doronoda	Tamaki & Amane by Fumi Yoshinaga
2026	Hon Nara Uru Hodo by Ao Kojima	Half Is More by Yoico Fujimi
