= Takarajimasha =

Japanese publishing company

Takarajimasha, Inc.
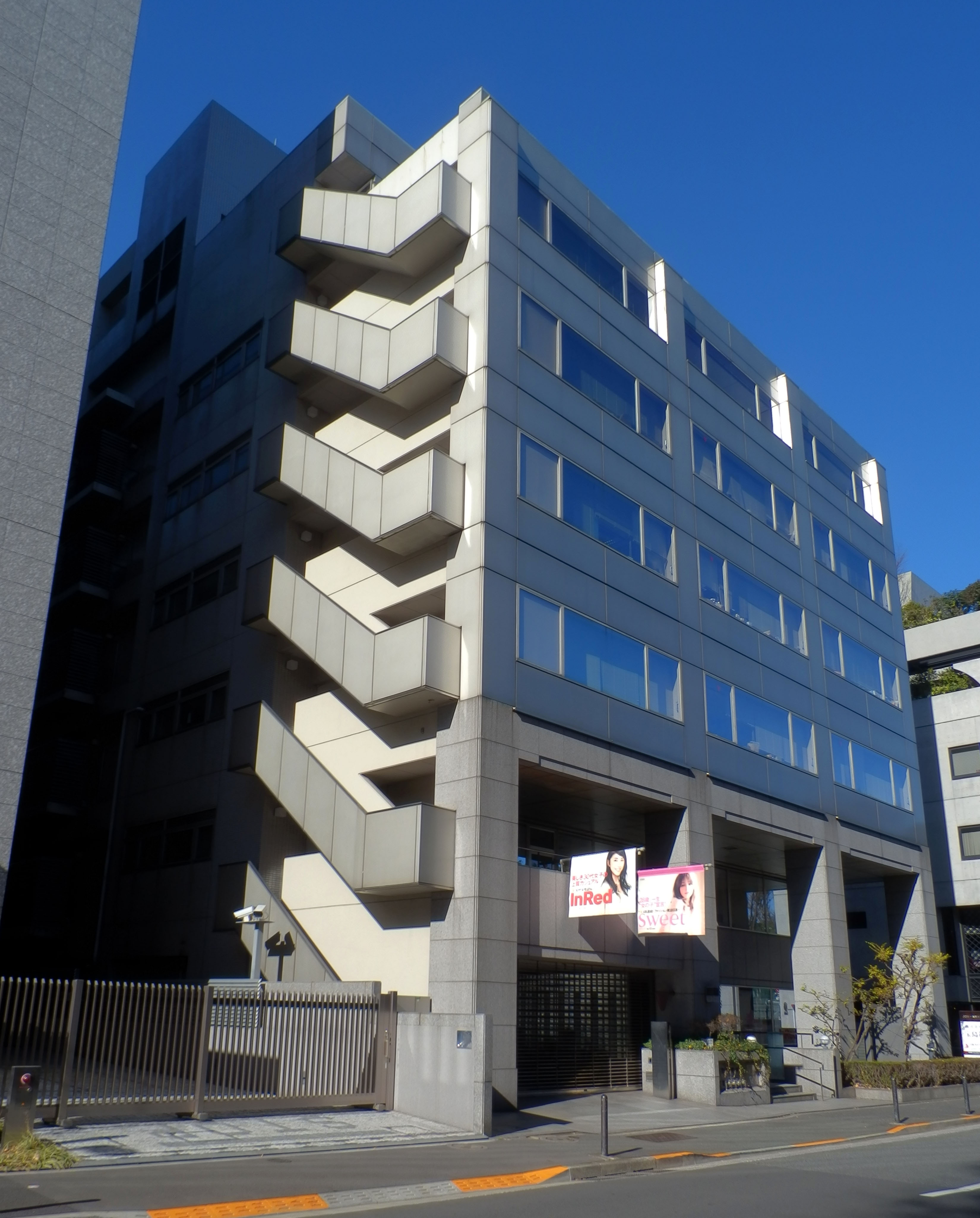
- Takarajimasha headquarters
- Predecessor: Takarajima Photo Chemicals Co., Ltd.
- Founded: September 22, 1971; 55 years ago
- Country of origin: Japan
- Headquarters location: Chiyoda, Tokyo, Japan
- Key people: Makoto Sekigawa (President)
- Fiction genres: Fashion magazines
- Revenue: ¥300.9 million
- No. of employees: 212 (as of September 2013)
- Official website: tkj.jp

Takarajimasha, Inc. (Japanese: 株式会社宝島社, Hepburn: Kabushiki Gaisha Takarajimasha) is a Japanese publishing company based in Chiyoda, Tokyo. It is known for publishing subculture-oriented fashion magazines aimed at teens, fashion magazines in general, as well as guide books.

== History ==
The company was founded on September 22, 1971, as a consulting business of local government titled JICC, Inc. (株式会社ジェー・アイ・シー・シー) and a successor of the former Takarajima Photo Chemicals Co., Ltd. that was founded in 1918. Established by some Waseda University former revolutionary students, in May 1974 it started to publish its first magazine, Takarajima, a Japanese subculture focused magazine, which was followed by Bessatsu Takarajima in March 1976. Kono Mystery ga Sugoi!, a guide book magazine, was first published in December 1989, while fashion magazine Cutie was first published in September 1989. On April 1, 1993, its name changed to Takarajimasha. Smart, Spring, and Sweet, all young-targeted fashion magazines, are published since October 1995, February 1996, and March 1999 respectively. Takarajimasha is also known for creating in 2005 the concept of "brand mook", a mook (Note: A mook is a book that has the content and format of magazine, but is designed to be for sale for a longer period than a magazine, like a book is.) featuring a catalogue of new items of a brand and limited edition product of this brand.

== Publications ==
=== Fashion ===
Targeted to teen girls

- Cutie
- Spring
- Mini
- Steady

Targeted to women in their 20s and 30s

- Sweet
- InRed
- Mori Girl Lesson

Targeted to women in their 40s

- Glow
- Linen (リンネル, Rinneru)

Targeted to men

- Smart
- Men's Roses

=== Other ===
Currently

- Takarajima (宝島)
- Bessatsu Takarajima (別冊宝島)
- Kono Mystery ga Sugoi!
- Kono Light Novel ga Sugoi!
- Kono Manga ga Sugoi! (このマンガがすごい!)
- Kono Anime ga Sugoi! (このアニメがすごい!)
- Kono Eiga ga Sugoi! (この映画がすごい!)
- Inakagurashi no Hon (田舎暮らしの本)

Former

- Weekly Shōnen Takarajima (週刊少年宝島, Shūkan Shōnen Takarajima)
- CUTiE Comic
- Takarajima 30 (宝島30)
- Famicom Hisshō Hon (ファミコン必勝本)
- UltraOne (ウルトラONE, Urutora Wan)
- Boom
- Band Yarouze (バンドやろうぜ, Bando Yarouze)
