= List of A Bride's Story chapters =

Cover of the first tankōbon volume of A Bride's Story, featuring Amir Halgal

A Bride's Story (乙嫁語り, Otoyomegatari) is a Japanese historical romance manga series written and illustrated by Kaoru Mori. The story follows the daily lives of several young women and their respective fiancés and husbands during the Russian conquest of Central Asia in the late 19th century. A Bride's Story was first serialized in Enterbrain's seinen manga magazine Harta (formerly known as Fellows!) from 14 October 2008 to 13 November 2020. It transferred to Kadokawa's manga magazine Aokishi on 18 June 2021. The series' chapters have been collected into fifteen tankōbon volumes by Kadokawa as of 20 November 2024. The first nine volumes were published under Enterbrain's Beam Comix imprint; subsequent volumes have been published under Kadokawa's Harta Comix imprint. In addition to the tankōbon release, a wide-ban collector's edition of the manga has been issued by Kadokawa since 20 August 2021. The wide-ban features large pages, high-quality paper, fold-out color illustrations, and special boxes to store each volume in. A Bride's Story is also available in digital e-book format in Japan.

Yen Press licensed the series for an English-language release in North America. The first volume was published on 31 May 2011; the fifteenth and most recent volume was published on 16 December 2025. The series received a digital release in English starting on 25 September 2018. A Bride's Story is also licensed for regional language releases by Ki-oon in France, Tokyopop Germany in Germany, J-Pop Manga in Italy, Norma Editorial in Spain, Studio JG in Poland, Punainen jättiläinen in Finland, Level Comics in Indonesia, Daewon C.I. in Korea, Kadokawa Taiwan in Taiwan, Siam Inter Comics in Thailand, and IPM in Vietnam.

== Volume list ==
No.	Original release date	Original ISBN	English release date	English ISBN
1	15 October 2009	978-4-04-726076-4	31 May 2011	978-0-316-18099-3
01. "The Bride and Her Young Groom" (乙嫁と聟花, Otoyome to Mukobana); 02. "The Charm" (お守り, Omamori); 03. "Horseback" (騎行, Kikō); 04. "We Want Amir Returned" (アミルをかえせ, Amiru o Kaese); 05. "The Cold" (風邪, Kaze)
2	15 June 2010	978-4-04-726586-8	25 October 2011	978-0-316-19446-4
06. "The Bread Oven" (パン焼き竈, Pan Yaki Kamado); 07. "Battle (Part 1)" (争い（前編）, Arasoi (Zenpen)); 08. "Battle (Part 2)" (争い（後編）, Arasoi (Kōhen)); 09. "Heart of a Bride" (嫁心, Yome Gokoro); 10. "Cloth Preparations" (布支度, Nuno Jitaku); 11. "Departure" (出発, Shuppatsu)
3	15 June 2011	978-4-04-727328-3	27 March 2012	978-0-316-21034-8
12. "Sojourn" (逗留, Tōryū); 13. "Entreaty" (懇願, Kongan); 14. "Talas's Feelings" (タラスの想い, Tarasu no Omoi); Bonus chapter: "Pariya Is at That Age" (パリヤさんはお年頃, Pariya-san wa Otoshigoro); 15. "Reunion" (再会, Saikai); 16. "Eating at the Market" (市場で買い食い, Ichiba de Kaigui); 17. "Heading to Ankara" (アンカラへ向かって, Ankara e Mukatte)
4	12 May 2012	978-4-04-728083-0	22 January 2013	978-0-316-23203-6
18. "Visitation" (訪れ, Otozure); 19. "The Twins of the Aral Sea" (アラル海のふたり, Araru Kai no Futari); 20. "After the Big One" (狙うは大物, Nerau wa Ōmono); 21. "Possibilities for the Twins" (ふたりの相手, Futari no Aite); 22. "A Crash Course in Bridehood" (短期集中花嫁修業, Tanki Shūchū Hanayome Shugyō); Bonus chapter: "At the Horse Market" (馬市場, Uma Ichiba)
5	15 January 2013	978-4-04-728631-3	24 September 2013	978-0-316-24309-4
23. "The Wedding Banquet (Part 1)" (祝宴（前編）, Shukuen (Zenpen)); 24. "The Wedding Banquet (Part 2)" (祝宴（中編）, Shukuen (Chūhen)); 25. "The Wedding Banquet (Part 3)" (祝宴（後編）, Shukuen (Kōhen)); 26. "The Daylong Song" (日暮歌, Higurashi Uta); Bonus chapter: "Queen of the Mountain" (岩山の女王, Iwayama no Joō); 27. "The Wounded Hawk" (手負いの鷹, Teoi no Taka)
6	14 January 2014	978-4-04-729396-0	28 October 2014	978-0-316-33610-9
28. "Comparing Heights" (背くらべ, Sei Kurabe); 29. "Grazing Land" (放牧地, Hōbokuchi); 30. "Meeting With the Badan" (バダンとの会談, Badan to no Kaiban); 31. "Cannon Barrage" (砲撃, Hōgeki); 32. "Cavalry Charge" (騎馬の襲撃, Kiba no Shūgeki); 33. "Azel's Offensive" (アゼルの攻勢, Azeru no Kōsei); 34. "Shielding You From Behind" (後ろ盾, Ushirodate); 35. "What One Deserves" (報い, Mukui)
7	14 February 2015	978-4-04-730243-3	17 November 2015	978-0-316-34893-5
36. "Water Garden" (水の園, Mizu no Sono); 37. "Avowed Sisters" (姉妹妻, Shimaizuma); 38. "Men's Baths" (男湯, Otokoyu); 39. "Nice to Meet You" (はじめまして, Hajimemashite); 40. "Sherine" (シーリーン, Shīrīn); 41. "The Ceremony of Vows" (契りの儀式, Chigiri no Gishiki); 42. "If It's You" (あなたなら, Anata nara); 43. "A Garden for Two" (ふたりの園, Futari no Sono); Bonus chapter: "Fever" (熱, Netsu)
8	14 December 2015	978-4-04-730782-7	27 September 2016	978-0-316-31762-7
44. "At the Moment a Rose Blooms" (ばらの花さくころ, Bara no Hana Saku Koro); Bonus chapter: "Gazelle" (ガゼル, Gazeru); 45. "Pariya's Needlework" (パリヤの刺繍, Pariya no Shishū); 46. "To the Northern Plains" (北の平野へ, Kita no Heiya e); 47. "Comb Holder" (櫛入れ, Kushi Ire); 48. "Umar Is Here" (ウマルが来た, Umaru ga Kita); 49. "A Long Day Trip for Two" (ふたりで遠駆け, Futari de Tōgake); 50. "The Worst Case Imaginable" (最悪の想像, Saiaku no Sōzō); 51. "Pariya's Decision" (パリヤの決意, Pariya no Ketsui)
9	15 December 2016	978-4-04-734378-8	26 September 2017	978-0-316-56262-1
Bonus chapter: "Living Things' Stories" (いきものがたり, Iki Monogatari); 52. "Pariya's Bread" (パリヤのパン, Pariya no Pan); 53. "What Kind of Person Is Umar?" (ウマルはどんなひと？, Umaru wa Donna Hito?); 54. "Conversation (Part 1)" (語らい（前編）, Katarai (Zenpen)); 55. "Conversation (Part 2)" (語らい（後編）, Katarai (Kōhen)); 56. "Board Game" (盤上遊戯, Banjō Yūgi); 57. "Stopover" (帰途, Kito); 58. "Makeshift Axle" (仮軸, Kari Jiku); 59. "The Visitors" (尋ね人, Tazunebito); 60. "Friends" (友だち, Tomodachi); 61. "About the Future" (これからのこと, Korekara no Koto)
10	15 February 2018	978-4-04-734829-5	27 November 2018	978-1-9753-2798-9
62. "Game" (狩猟肉, Shuryō Niku); 63. "Golden Eagle" (イヌワシ, Inuwashi); 64. "Ana (Mother)" (母親, Ana); 65. "Mounted Falconry" (騎馬鷹狩猟, Kiba Taka Gariryō); 66. "Going to Watch the Horses" (馬を見に, Uma o Mi ni); 67. "Village on the Border" (国境いの村, Kunisakai no Mura); 68. "On the Mountain Trail" (山道にて, Yamamichi nite); 69. "Reunion" (再会, Saikai)
11	15 December 2018	978-4-04-735343-5	27 August 2019	978-1-9753-8492-0
70. "Song of Midwinter" (寒中歌, Kanchū Ka); 71. "From the Start" (あれから, Are kara); 72. "Promise" (約束, Yakusoku); 73. "Wet Collodion Process" (湿板写真, Shippan Shashin); 74. "The Days Prior" (前日, Zenjitsu); 75. "To the South" (南へ, Minami e); 76. "Watch" (時計, Tokei); 77. "Antalya" (アンタリヤ, Antariya)
12	13 December 2019	978-4-04-735797-6	22 September 2020	978-1-9753-3319-5
78. "Spare Time, Part 1" (閑暇（前編）, Kanka (Zenpen)); 79. "Spare Time, Part 2" (閑暇（後編）, Kanka (Kōhen)); 80. "Samosa" (サモサ, Samosa); 81. "Hair" (髪, Kami); 82. "Pilgrim" (巡礼者, Junrei-sha); 83. "Persian Night" (ペルシアの夜に, Perushia no Yoru ni); 84. "The Letter" (手紙, Tegami); 85. "Pictures With Everyone" (みんなで写真撮影, Minna de Shashin Satsuei); 86. "Long Friendships" (長いお付き合い, Nagai o Tsukiai)
13	15 March 2021	978-4-04-736265-9	19 April 2022	978-1-9753-4145-9
87. "Woodworking" (木彫り, Kibori); 88. "The Guests, Part 1" (お客様（前編）, Okyakusama (Zenpen)); 89. "The Guests, Part 2" (お客様（後編）, Okyakusama (Kōhen)); 90. "To the Sea" (海へ, Umi e); 91. "Unease" (不安, Fuan); 92. "Bandits" (物盗り, Monotori); 93. "Turning Point" (分岐点, Bunkiten); 94. "Decision" (選択, Sentaku); 95. "On the Way Home" (帰途, Kito)
14	20 October 2022	978-4-04-737259-7	19 September 2023	978-1-9753-7393-1
96. "Meeting" (会談, Kaidan); 97. "Golden Ice" (金色の氷, Konjiki no Kōri); 98. "A Single Arrow" (一本の矢, Ippon no ya); 99. "Conclusion" (決着, Ketchaku); 100. "Wedding" (婚礼, Konrei); 101. "New Brides" (新妻, Nīdzuma)
15	20 November 2024	978-4-04-738172-8	16 December 2025	979-8-8554-2261-0
102. "Shipboard Cat" (船乗り猫, Funanori Neko); 103. "Homecoming" (帰国, Kikoku); 104. "Parents and Child" (親と子, Oya to ko); 105. "New Residence" (新居, Shinkyo); 106. "Mother-in-Law" (義母, Gibo); 107. "Visitors" (訪問客, Hōmon Kyaku); 108. "Ali of Tabriz" (タブリーズのアリ, Taburīzu no Ari); 109. "Ali's Wedding" (アリの結婚, Ari no Kekkon)

== Chapters not yet in tankōbon format ==
The following chapters have yet to be published in a tankōbon volume:
