= Nami Sano =

Japanese manga artist (1987–2023)

Nami Sano 佐野 菜見
- Born: 17 April 1987 Nishinomiya, Hyōgo, Japan
- Died: 5 August 2023 (aged 36)
- Area: Manga artist
- Notable works: Haven't You Heard? I'm Sakamoto; Migi & Dali
- Awards: Comic Natalie Grand Prize (2013)

Nami Sano (Japanese: 佐野 菜見, Hepburn: Sano Nami; 17 April 1987 – 5 August 2023) was a Japanese manga artist. She made her debut in 2010 with the one-shot title Non-Sugar Coffee. She later published two series, Haven't You Heard? I'm Sakamoto (2012–2015) and Migi & Dali (2017–2021), which were both adapted into anime series.

== Early life ==
Sano was born in Nishinomiya, Hyōgo, on 17 April 1987. She attended Gakubun Junior High School, where she served as the head of the tennis club. She later attended and graduated from Naruo High School. According to a former classmate, Sano was a quiet student but was skilled in painting, stating that she drew the background for a class play during their school's cultural festival. She had wanted to be a manga artist since she was in elementary school and started drawing manga while in high school. Sano graduated from Kyoto Seika University under its Cartoon Manga course. Twin Star Exorcists author Yoshiaki Sukeno, an alumni and professor at the university, said that Sano once served as his assistant.

== Career ==
At age 20, Sano submitted her comics to three publishers, receiving a reply from Tatsuya Shiode, an editor for the magazine Harta (formerly named Fellows!). Shiode said that he "felt a lot of energy" in Sano's drawings despite them not being polished. She debuted as a manga artist in April 2010 with the one-shot Non-Sugar Coffee, which was published in Fellows! The following year, Sano's one-shot Broad-Shouldered Hiroshi was included in the Costume Fellows! 2011 booklet. Her next one-shot Taylor's House was released in Fellows! that year.

Sano's debut series was originally planned to be a "romantic comedy about [a] boy who can see the five seconds into the future, and how he falls in love with other girls." After Sano sent some storyboards, Shiode said the story was "not funny at all", prompting her to change it into a gag manga. The series Haven't You Heard? I'm Sakamoto was initially a one-shot published in Fellows! in August 2011, before being serialized in the same magazine from April 2012 to December 2015. It revolves around a high school student named Sakamoto who has a reputation for being the "coolest" person in the entire student body. It was compiled into four tankōbon volumes, which have collectively sold over 3.5 million copies. The series won the Comic Natalie Grand Prize in 2013 and was nominated for the Manga Taishō in 2014. Studio Deen adapted the manga into an anime series in 2016; a spin-off one-shot titled A.K.A. 8823 was published in Harta in the same year. Sano was a special guest at Anime Expo 2016 where she held autograph sessions.

Sano stated that her next series would also be a comedy, but it would focus more on the characters' feelings and a goal that they would work towards. The series was titled Migi & Dali, which was serialized in Harta from July 2017 to November 2021. It follows the titular twins Migi and Dali who pose as a boy named Hitori while finding out the truth surrounding their mother's death. Seven tankōbon volumes were released, which have a total of 350,000 copies in circulation. It was adapted into an anime series by Geek Toys and CompTown in 2023. Sano drew the illustrations shown in the anime's ending sequence; they were later included in a 28-page booklet titled The Timeless Collection of Arts from "Migi & Dali" that was bundled with an issue of Harta. She also illustrated the cover art of Nulbarich's "Skyline", the anime's ending song. Sano finished supervising the adaptation prior to her death.

== Death ==
In May 2023, Sano went for a checkup after she felt tension in her abdomen. A tumor was discovered in her ovary; a month before her death it was diagnosed as malignant and already in its fourth stage. Sano died of ovarian cancer on 5 August 2023 at age 36; a funeral was held on 7 and 8 August. She was in the process of planning a new manga while undergoing treatment. Her death was made public on 16 August. The announcement included a passage from her final letter, which stated, "This ended up being a fun life. I am now going to a more free world. Goodbye." Takuto Kashiki, author of Hakumei and Mikochi, and voice actors Ayumu Murase and Shun Horie were among those who offered their condolences. Sano, Haven't You Heard? I'm Sakamoto, Migi & Dali, and the phrase "one month of illness" also became trending topics on Twitter in Japan following the announcement.

== Style, influences and legacy ==
Sano has cited Magical Circle Guru Guru as her inspiration to become a manga artist, calling the story "very down to earth" and adding that she liked the humor. She was also inspired by manga artist Kaoru Mori. The Asahi Shimbun called Sano's style unique, stating that she does not incorporate a straight man character into the story, but rather leaves the humor to the reader's interpretation. Reviewers for Anime News Network said that she had "a distinctive perspective and gauge for hilarity" and "a unique knack for absurdist humor."

The setting of Haven't You Heard? I'm Sakamoto is primarily modeled after locations in Sano's hometown of Nishinomiya, particularly those along the Hanshin Main Line. In 2016, a collaboration was held between the anime adaptation, the city of Nishinomiya, and Hanshin Electric Railway which involved various projects, including a stamp rally and posters being displayed in various locations in the city. The collaboration led to local and overseas fans traveling to Nishinomiya as a form of pilgrimage. After the announcement of Sano's death, the local community offered their condolences. A column published by the Nishinomiya Mayor's Office thanked her for "sharing the wonders" of the city. In December 2023, a special program about Sano was presented during the Fureai Festival at Gakubun Junior High School.

In August 2024, a 50-page feature on Sano was published in Harta; it contains illustrations and messages from over 20 authors and editors, and includes Happy Chocolate, a one-shot made by Sano prior to her debut. Nami Sano Collection, an anthology that compiles Sano's unpublished works, was also released that month. An art exhibition featuring illustrations and drafts from Sano was held in Tokyo, Nishinomiya, Kobe, and Nagasaki from September 2024 to October 2026.

== Works ==
=== Serials ===
- Haven't You Heard? I'm Sakamoto (坂本ですが?, Sakamoto desu ga?) (2012–2015, serialized in Harta)
- Migi & Dali (ミギとダリ) (2017–2021, serialized in Harta)

=== One-shots ===
- Non-Sugar Coffee (ノンシュガーコーヒー) (2010, published in Fellows!)
- Broad-Shouldered Hiroshi (肩幅ひろし, Katahaba Hiroshi) (2011, published in Costume Fellows! 2011)
- Taylor's House (テイラーズ・ハウス) (2011, published in Fellows!)
- Haven't You Heard? I'm Sakamoto (坂本ですが?, Sakamoto desu ga?) (2011, published in Fellows!)
- Tall Man Here (のっぽがいる, Noppo ga Iru) (2016, published in U12 Kodomo Fellows)
- A.K.A. 8823 (人よんで8823, Hito Yonde 8823) (2016, published in Harta)
- My Dear Girlfriend (いとしの紙一重, Itoshi no Kamihitoe) (2018, published in Slender Fellows)
- Unpublished one-shots, later included in Nami Sano Collection (佐野菜見作品集, Sano Nami Sakuhinshū) (2024)
  - Tulip for You (チューリップを君に, Tulip o Kimi ni) (2007)
  - Happy Chocolate (幸せのチョコレート, Shiawase no Chokorēto) (2008)
  - Moon Song (月のうた, Tsuki no Uta) (2009)
  - La Rue (La Rue ラ・ルー) (2009)
  - My Home (マイホーム) (2010)

=== Other ===
- Harta volume 81 (magazine; 2021) – cover illustration
- Migi & Dali (anime; 2023) – ending sequence illustrations
- "Skyline" (song; 2023) – cover illustration
