= Isabella Bird in Wonderland =

Manga series by Taiga Sassa

ふしぎの国のバード (Fushigi no Kuni no Bādo)
- Manga
- Written by: Taiga Sassa
- Published by: Enterbrain
- English publisher: JP: Kadokawa (bilingual)
- Magazine: Harta
- Original run: May 15, 2015 – present
- Volumes: 11
- icon

Isabella Bird in Wonderland (Japanese: ふしぎの国のバード, Hepburn: Fushigi no Kuni no Bādo) (Note: The English subtitle is UNBEATEN TRACKS in JAPAN: An Account of Travels in The Interior Including Visits to The Aborigines of YEZO and The Shrines of NIKKO and ISE.) is a manga series by Taiga Sassa, published by Kadokawa, portraying Isabella Bird's exploration of Japan. It is serialized in the magazine Harta.

In May 2015, Kadokawa published the first tankōbon volume, and in 2018 it began publishing, within Japan, a bilingual Japanese-English version of the comic intended for Japanese people studying English. The bilingual version places the original Japanese text in the page margins with new English text taking its place. The bilingual comic volumes include a column from British journalist Ryohei Kawai (川合 亮平, Kawai Ryōhei) and an interview with the author. Kadokawa also published the manga in Taiwan. Éditions Ki-oon published the manga in France as Isabella Bird, femme exploratrice.

== Characters ==
- Isabella Bird (イザベラ・バード, Isabera Bādo)
- Tsurukichi Ito (伊藤 鶴吉, Itō Tsurukichi) – Bird's translator and guide
- James Hepburn (ジェームス・ヘボン, Jēmusu Hebon) – He helps Bird find a translator
- Sir Harry Parkes (ハリー・パークス, Harii Pākusu) – The British Consul to Japan, he helps Bird get the travel documents needed for her journey
- Fanny Parkes (ファニー・パークス, Fanii Pākusu) – Harry Parkes's wife

== See also ==
- Unbeaten Tracks in Japan – Isabella Bird's travel diary
