= Tsugumi Project =

Japanese manga series

- First tankōbon volume cover, featuring Leon (back) and Tsugumi (front)

虎鶫 とらつぐみ -TSUGUMI PROJECT- (Tora Tsugumi: Tsugumi Project)
- Genre: Adventure
- Manga
- Written by: ippatu
- Published by: Kodansha
- English publisher: NA: Kodansha USA
- Magazine: Weekly Young Magazine
- Original run: January 25, 2021 – September 15, 2023
- Volumes: 7
- Anime television series
- Original run: January 2027 – scheduled

Tsugumi Project (Japanese: 虎鶫 とらつぐみ -TSUGUMI PROJECT-, Hepburn: Tora Tsugumi: Tsugumi Project) is a Japanese manga series written and illustrated by ippatu. Initially released in July 2019 in France, the series was serialized in Kodansha's Weekly Young Magazine from January 2021 to November 2023. The series' individual chapters were collected into seven volumes from June 2021 to November 2023. An anime television series adaptation is set to premiere in January 2027.

== Plot ==
More than two centuries after nuclear war devastated Japan and left the archipelago sealed off from the rest of the world, the former nation has become a dangerous wasteland filled with irradiated mutated creatures and abandoned remnants of the old civilization. Leon, a French soldier, is falsely convicted and separated from his family before being sent with other convicts on a mission into the forbidden territory.

Leon and the others are given one year to locate a powerful old-world weapon known only by the codename TORATSUGUMI in exchange for their freedom. As the mission quickly turns into a fight for survival, Leon encounters Tsugumi, a mysterious half-human girl with talons who saves him and becomes central to the truth behind the mysterious weapon.

== Characters ==
Leon (レオン, Reon)
Voiced by: Masaaki Mizunaka
Dudu (ドゥドゥ, Doudou)
Voiced by: Haruki Ishiya
Tsugumi (つぐみ)
Voiced by: Misaki Watada

== Media ==
=== Manga ===
Written and illustrated by ippatu, the series was first published in France by Ki-oon on July 4, 2019. On January 25, 2021, the series began serialization in Kodansha's Weekly Young Magazine. The series finished on September 15, 2023. The series' individual chapters were collected into seven tankōbon volumes from June 4, 2021, to November 9, 2023.

At Anime Expo 2022, Kodansha USA announced that they licensed the series for English publication.

==== Volumes ====
| No. | Original release date | Original ISBN | English release date | English ISBN |
|---|---|---|---|---|
| 1 | June 4, 2021 | 978-4-06-523345-0 | May 9, 2023 (digital); May 16, 2023 (print) | 978-1-64-651789-3 |
| 2 | August 5, 2021 | 978-4-06-523842-4 | August 1, 2023 | 978-1-64-651790-9 |
| 3 | October 6, 2021 | 978-4-06-523841-7 | October 24, 2023 | 978-1-64-651791-6 |
| 4 | February 4, 2022 | 978-4-06-526828-5 | January 16, 2024 (digital); February 20, 2024 (print) | 978-1-64-651792-3 |
| 5 | June 6, 2022 | 978-4-06-528101-7 | May 28, 2024 | 978-1-64-651806-7 |
| 6 | March 6, 2023 | 978-4-06-531052-6 | December 3, 2024 | 979-8-88-877076-4 |
| 7 | November 9, 2023 | 978-4-06-533493-5 | September 30, 2025 | 979-8-88-877260-7 |

=== Anime ===
On July 14, 2026, an anime television series adaptation was announced. It is set to premiere in January 2027.

== Reception ==
Erkael and Koiwai from Manga News liked the story; they also favorably compared the artwork to that of Keisuke Itagaki. Faustine Lillaz from Planete BD praised the artwork as realistic and the characters and setting as charismatic and intriguing.

In the 2022 edition of the Kono Manga ga Sugoi! guidebook, the series ranked 20th on the list of the top manga for male readers.
