= Immortal Hounds =

Japanese manga series

- The cover of the first volume of Immortal Hounds, showing the escape artist Windchime

不死の猟犬 (Shinazu no Ryōken)
- Genre: Action; Romance; Science fiction
- Manga
- Written by: Ryō Yasohachi
- Published by: Enterbrain
- English publisher: Vertical
- Magazine: Harta
- Original run: July 13, 2013 – November 13, 2020
- Volumes: 7
- Manga

Immortal Ridge
- Written by: Ryō Yasohachi
- Published by: Enterbrain
- Magazine: Harta
- Original run: July 15, 2017 – August 10, 2019
- Volumes: 3
- icon

Immortal Hounds (Japanese: 不死(しなず)の猟犬, Hepburn: Shinazu no Ryōken) is a Japanese manga series written and illustrated by Ryō Yasohachi. It is set in an alternate universe where humans are instantly resurrected after death, save for Vectors, who can spread "Resurrection Deficiency Syndrome". It was serialized in Enterbrain's seinen manga magazine Harta from 2013 to 2020, and is licensed in North America by Vertical. The manga received a sequel titled Immortal Ridge (不死(しなず)の稜線, Shinazu no Ryōsen), which shows the story from the perspective of Vectors.

== Plot ==
It is a setting where regular people are Immortal, being able to get resurrected instantaneously. People who can die, are called "Vectors". The term Vector comes from the medical term for being a source of sickness. The condition is called RDS: Resurrection deficiency syndrome. In this world, when people get sick, they kill themselves to "reset" their biological state. People can get RDS if they fall in love with people who have RDS. People discover a person is a Vector when they refuse to get "reset."

Vectors are euthanized to prevent spreading their disease.

The two main characters are a Detective named Kenzaki Shinichi and "The Escape Artist." Kenzaki lost his sister because she fell in love with a Vector and committed suicide. The other main character, the Escape Artist, is a highly trained vector whose identity is hidden by a ribbon clipped to her hair. This ribbon makes her head a white-out to everyone else. The escape artist is just a term, and this escape artist's name is Kazama Rin, a police office clerk. The story focuses on the violent combat between Vectors and Immortals.

== Release ==
The manga started serialization in the sixth issue of Enterbrain's seinen manga magazine Harta on July 13, 2013, and ended on November 13, 2020, in the 79th issue. The first compiled volume was released on June 13, 2014, and the seventh and last on December 15, 2020. Vertical announced that it had licensed the manga in North America at its panel for Katsucon on February 12, 2016, releasing the first volume on July 26, 2016, and the last on April 9, 2024. The manga is also licensed in France by Ki-oon.

=== Volumes ===
No.	Original release date	Original ISBN	North American release date	North American ISBN
1	June 13, 2014	978-4-04-729720-3	July 26, 2016	978-1-942993-59-9
01. "Death by Pistol is Best" (死ぬならピストルに限る, Shinu Nara Pisutoru ni Kagiru); 02. "Hurry Up and Be Exterminated" (さっさと駆除されとけ, Sassa to Kujosaretoke); 03. "Talking About Garbage Like Love" (愛なんて言ってるから, Ai nante Itteru kara); 04. "I Just Hate..." (嫌いなんですよ, Kiraina N Desu yo); 05. "Go On. Shoot" (撃っちゃいなさい, Utchai Nasai); 06. "Don't Let Him Catch You" (尻尾を捕まれるな, Shippo o Tsukamareru na); 07. "A Hound in the Force" (内部に犬がいる, Naibu ni Inu ga Iru)
2	February 14, 2015	978-4-04-730245-7	October 25, 2016	978-1-942993-60-5
08. "I Can't Afford to Give Up" (やめるわけにはいきません, Yameru Wake ni wa Ikimasen); 09. "My Prey" (私の獲物, Watashi no Emono); 10. "Regret and Suffering" (後悔と苦しみ, Kōkai to Kurushimi); 11. "Are You the Spy?" (犬はお前か？, Inu wa Omae ka?); 12. "The Start of a Serious Battle" (真剣勝負のはじまりです, Shinkenshōbu no Hajimari Desu); 13. "A World of Zombies" (ゾンビの世界, Zonbi no Sekai); 14. "Cute Girl" (可愛い子, Kawaii Ko); 15. "The Vector Called Snow White" (白雪姫と呼ばれたベクター, Shirayukihime to Yobareta Bekutā)
3	August 12, 2015	978-4-04-730613-4	January 24, 2017	978-1-942993-61-2
16. "Love's Location" (愛の在りか, Ai no Arika); 17. "Are You Home, Mr. Tobita?" (飛田さんご存知ですか, Tobita-san Gozonji Desu ka); 18. "Creampie" (なかだし, Nakadashi); 19. "Karigane (Part 1)" (雁金(その1), Karigane (Sono Ichi)); 20. "Karigane (Part 2)" (雁金(その2), Karigane (Sono Ni)); 21. "Karigane (Part 3)" (雁金(その3), Karigane (Sono San)); Bonus. "Sandwich" (サンドウィッチ, Sandowicchi)
4	April 15, 2016	978-4-04-734130-2	April 18, 2017	978-1-942993-87-2
22. "I Would Have Been Sweet to You" (可愛がってあげます, Kawaigatte Agemasu); 23. "At the End of the Battle for Retrieval" (奪還戦の果て, Dakkan-sen no Hate); 24. "Using Up Vacation Days" (有給休暇, Yūkyū Kyūka); 25. "Anti-lieutenant Kenzaki Plan Log" (対剣崎警部補作戦日誌, Tai Kenzaki Keibuho Sakusen Nisshi); 26. "Sayori and Misago" (針魚(さより)と魚鷹(みさご), Sayori to Misago); 27. "My Daughther, Marie" (娘、麻理恵, Musume, Marie)
5	November 15, 2016	978-4-04-734379-5	July 11, 2017	978-1-945054-27-3
28. "No Escape" (抜け道もなし, Nukemichi mo Nashi); 29. "But We Were Drinking Buddies" (飲み友達だったのに, Nomitomodachi Datta no ni); 30. "Mama" (ママ, Mama); 31. "I'll Take Her" (俺がもらう, Ore ga Morau); 32. "The Raid's True Aim" (奇襲の真髄, Kishū no Shinzui); 33. "Task Force" (別働隊, Betsudōtai)
6	July 15, 2017	978-4-04-734621-5	January 30, 2018	978-1-945054-57-0
34. "Clever Scheme" (奇策, Kisaku); 35. "Meanwhile" (同時刻, Dōjikoku); 36. "Karigane vs. Tsubaki" (雁金vs.椿, Karigane Bāsasu Tsubaki); 37. "Conclusion" (決着, Ketchaku); 38. "Shall We Return?" (ではズラかるか, Dewa Zurakaruka); 39. "Truth" (真相, Shinsō); 40. "System of Immortality" (不死の"システム", Fushi no "Shisutemu")
7	December 15, 2020	978-4-04-736109-6	April 9, 2024	978-1-647293-27-7
Extra 1. Onna Nage (女投げ); Extra 2. Gomu (ゴム); Extra 3. Shirayukihime no Ima (白雪姫の今); Extra 4. Nanori (名乗り); 41. Yakusoku no Hi (約束の日); 42. Maisō to Ane (埋葬と姉); 43. Aisuru to Shinu (愛すると死ぬ); 44. Fushi Fusatsu (不死不殺); 45. Kanai no Negai to Kenzaki no Meirei (金井の願いと剣崎の命令); 46. Fūrin no Chi (風鈴の血); 47. Shishifunjin (獅子奮迅); 48. Chakutō (Zenpen) (着到（前編）); Final. Chakutō (Kōhen) (着到（後編）)

== Reception ==
Jason Thompson of Otaku USA called the series' premise "interesting and suspenseful", though whether its ramifications would be explored would have to be seen. Thompson recommended the manga, calling it "a fun, violent ride with some cool mind games". Reviewing the manga for the Fandom Post, Matthew Warner found the first volume to have a "truly intriguing setup", praising the action and pacing, as well the way in which new information is introduced. Reviewing the third volume, Warner highlighted the powerful characters who "dominate attention when they're on the scene". Of the fourth volume, Warner criticized the unexpected capture of the Escape Artists, saying that it derailed the series and made it "a bit weaker and more detached".

The manga was chosen as part of the Young Adult Library Services Association's 2017 list of Great Graphic Novels for Teens.
