= Unbeaten Tracks in Japan =

Travel diary by Isabella Bird

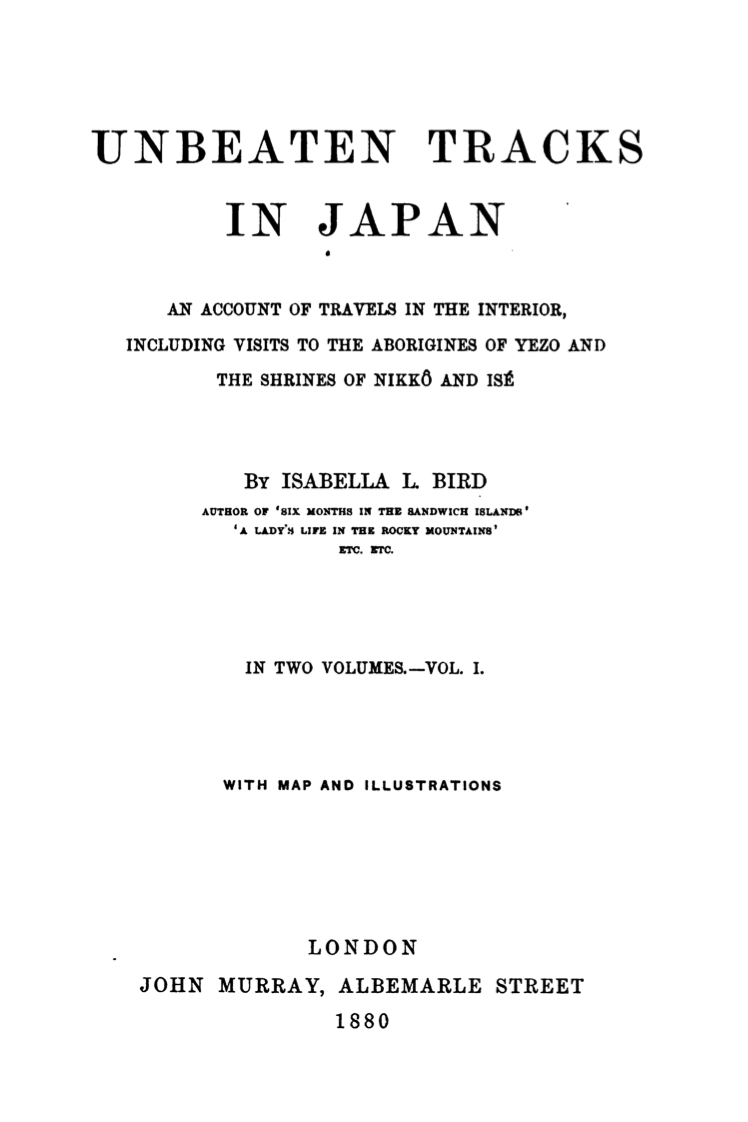
- The title page for Unbeaten Tracks in Japan, Volume 1, first edition.
- Author: Isabella Bird
- Publisher: John Murray (original), G.P. Putnam's (United States)
- Publication date: 1880

Unbeaten Tracks in Japan (日本奥地紀行, Nihon Okuchi Kikō) is a book by the English travel writer Isabella Bird, in the form of letters to her sister, describing her journey from Tokyo to Hokkaido in 1878, when she was 46. It was first published in two volumes in 1880 by John Murray, which later arranged an abridged one-volume version in 1885.

Bird became interested in Japan after reading John Francis Campbell's My Circular Notes (1876). Campbell recommended that she meet Colin Alexander McVean, who had just returned to Scotland from Japan. McVean was a former Surveyor in Chief of the Japanese Government and gave her all sorts of advice. Campbell walked the Nakasendo post-way through the Japanese Highlands, whereas Bird headed for the northern areas less affected by the new government.

The book recounts how Bird made the journey with a Japanese interpreter named Itō Tsurukichi, visiting places that few or no Westerners had seen before, between June and September 1878. It records in great detail her responses to Japanese houses, clothing and customs, and the natural environment, as they were during the early years of the Meiji Restoration. It also has a long section describing her visits to the Ainu people, and many passages describing what seemed to her the extreme poverty of many Japanese outside the major cities.

An abridged version was published in the United Kingdom. In 1978 this abridged version was published in Japan; the latter was translated into Japanese by Kenkichi Takanashi. In 2000 a paperback version of the Takanashi translation appeared.

Isabella Bird in Wonderland, a manga based on the book, was published in 2015.

In 2020 Kiyonori Kasanaka wrote that the existence of the abridged version gave a misleading impression that the work was what Bird originally wrote and that people believed that "the book itself was essentially a compendium of letters written to home during her travels." According to Kasanaka, many of the subsequent Japanese translations of Bird's material were misleading.

Kasanaka wrote Isabella Bird and Japan: A Reassessment, translated by Nicholas Pertwee, with the English version published in 2017.
