= Kaoru Mori =

Japanese manga artist (born 1978)

Kaoru Mori 森 薫
- Born: 18 September 1978 (age 48) Tokyo, Japan
- Areas: Character design, writer, manga artist, illustrator
- Pseudonyms: Fumio Agata (県 文緒, Agata Fumio)
- Notable works: Shirley; Emma; A Bride's Story
- Awards: 9th Japan Media Arts Festival (2005); 39th Angoulême International Comics Festival (2012); 7th Manga Taishō (2014)

Kaoru Mori (森 薫, Mori Kaoru; born 18 September 1978) is a Japanese manga artist from Tokyo and the creator of the manga series Shirley, Emma, and A Bride's Story. Many of her works are centered on female characters in the 19th century, such as a maid in Victorian Britain and a bride in Turkic Central Asia.

== Career ==
She also wrote dōjinshi (self-published manga) under the pen name Fumio Agata (県 文緒, Agata Fumio) as a member of the dōjin circle Lady Maid. In 2010, Mori's first published work, Shirley, was revived in a two-part continuation called Shirley Madison in Fellows! (now Harta) magazine. Her latest work, A Bride's Story, began serialization in the same magazine in 2008 and transferred to Aokishi magazine in 2021.

Mori visited Finland in 2014, participating in the Animecon event held in Kuopio.

The Setagaya Literary Museum in Tokyo featured her and fellow manga artist Aki Irie in an exhibition between November 2024 and February 2025.

== Style ==
Mori's works are known for their high level of detail in terms of clothing design, historical nuances, and background work. Her manga series are often published outside Japan in larger, hardbound editions to complement the heavy detail seen on every page. Similar to authors such as Hiromu Arakawa, Mori often depicts herself in unflattering self-portraits with a simple outline for a body and a head full of wild hair, as she is very reluctant to show her face during public events or interviews. While she strives for historical realism, she acknowledges that some inaccuracies may occur.

Mori works mostly on her own, with the help of two assistants who support her with finishing touches. Drawing one chapter of about 24 pages can take two to three weeks.

== Works ==
- Shirley (シャーリー, Shārī) – Release date: February 2003, relaunched in 2010. ISBN 4-7577-1313-4.
- Emma (エマ, Ema) – Serialized in Enterbrain's Comic Beam magazine from 2002 to 2008. Published in 10 volumes.
- A Bride's Story (乙嫁語り, Otoyomegatari) – First serialized in Enterbrain's Harta magazine from October 2008 to November 2020. Transferred to Kadokawa's Aokishi magazine in June 2021.

=== Contributions ===
- Violet Blossoms (すみれの花, Sumire no Hana) – Art; story by Satoshi Fukushima.

== Awards ==
- Excellence Prize – 2005 Japan Media Arts Festival, for Emma
- Prix Intergénérations ("Intergenerational Award") – 2012 Angoulême International Comics Festival, for A Bride's Story
- 7th Annual Manga Taishō Award – 2014 Manga Taishō, for A Bride's Story
