= Teito Kage Monogatari =

Japanese manga series

- First tankōbon volume cover

帝都影物語
- Manga
- Written by: Fumika Higa
- Published by: Enterbrain
- Imprint: Harta Comix
- Magazine: Harta
- Original run: August 12, 2020 – June 15, 2023
- Volumes: 3
- icon

Teito Kage Monogatari (Japanese: 帝都影物語; lit. 'Tale of the Imperial Capital Body Double') is a Japanese manga series written and illustrated by Fumika Higa. It was serialized in Enterbrain's seinen manga magazine Harta from August 2020 to June 2023, with its chapters collected in three tankōbon volumes.

== Publication ==
Written and illustrated by Fumika Higa, Teito Kage Monogatari was serialized in Enterbrain's seinen manga magazine Harta from August 12, 2020, (Note: It started serialization in the magazine's 77th issue of 2020, which was released on August 12.) to June 15, 2023. (Note: It finished serialization in the magazine's 105th issue of 2023, which was released on June 15.) Enterbrain collected its chapters in three tankōbon volumes, published from May 14, 2021, to July 14, 2023.

=== Volumes ===
No.	Release date	ISBN
1	May 14, 2021	978-4-04-736619-0
2	May 13, 2022	978-4-04-737052-4
3	July 14, 2023	978-4-04-737454-6
