= Shirley (manga) =

Japanese manga series

- Cover of the first volume

シャーリー (Shārii)
- Genre: Slice of life
- Manga
- Written by: Kaoru Mori
- Published by: Enterbrain (2003–2025); Yukiwarisō (2026–present)
- English publisher: NA: CMX (expired)
- Magazine: Harta (2003–2021); Aokishi (2021–2025)
- Original run: February 24, 2003 – present
- Volumes: 3
- icon

Shirley (Japanese: シャーリー, Hepburn: Shārii) is a Japanese manga series written and illustrated by Kaoru Mori. Originally written as doujinshi, it was later published by Enterbrain in February 2003. Since 2006, Mori has continued to irregularly publish new chapters of the series in Harta and later Aokishi. A second volume was released in September 2014, while a third volume was released in September 2026 by Yukiwarisō.

== Publication ==
Written and illustrated by Kaoru Mori, the series originated as doujinshi, which was subsequently published by Enterbrain in tankōbon format on February 24, 2003. Beginning in 2010, Mori has been irregularly publishing new chapters in Enterbrain's Harta (formerly known as Fellows!) magazine. In 2021, Mori began publishing the chapters in Enterbrain's Aokishi magazine instead. In April 2023, Mori released a chapter with only five pages completed due to her health. A second tankōbon volume was released in September 2014. A third tankōbon volume was released in September 2026 by Yukiwarisō.

At San Diego Comic-Con 2007, CMX announced that they had licensed the series for English publication.

=== Volume list ===
No.	Original release date	Original ISBN	English release date	English ISBN
1	February 24, 2003	978-4-04-729955-9	July 2, 2008	978-1-40-121777-8
2	September 13, 2014	978-4-04-729917-7	—	—
3	September 30, 2026	978-4-91-127805-5	—	—

== Reception ==
A columnist for Manga News felt the artwork was not as good as that in Mori's next work Emma but was still satisfactory. They also praised the characters, while also describing the story as "uneven". Katherine Dacey of Manga Critic praised the artwork and overall story, though she felt some of the chapters were unfinished.

In the 2015 edition of the Kono Manga ga Sugoi! guidebook's list of the top 20 manga for male readers, the series ranked eighth.
