= The Coppersmith's Bride =

Japanese manga series

- First tankōbon volume cover

クプルムの花嫁 (Kupurumu no Hanayome)
- Genre: Romantic comedy
- Manga
- Written by: Namo
- Published by: Enterbrain
- English publisher: NA: J-Novel Club
- Imprint: Harta Comix
- Magazine: Harta
- Original run: May 15, 2020 – present
- Volumes: 8
- icon

The Coppersmith's Bride (Japanese: クプルムの花嫁, Hepburn: Kupurumu no Hanayome; lit. 'Cuprum Bride') is a Japanese manga series written and illustrated by Namo. It began serialization in Enterbrain's seinen manga magazine Harta in May 2020.

== Plot ==
After graduating from high school, Shiina lives with her coppersmith boyfriend Shuu in Niigata Prefecture. One day, Shuu proposes marriage to Shiina, and it catches her by surprise. Shiina isn't knowledgeable about her boyfriend's profession, but she's willing to be of use to him.

== Publication ==
Written and illustrated by Namo, The Coppersmith's Bride began serialization in Enterbrain's seinen manga magazine Harta on May 15, 2020. Its chapters have been collected into eight tankōbon volumes as of May 2026. The series is licensed in English by J-Novel Club.

No.	Original release date	Original ISBN	North American release date	North American ISBN
1	January 15, 2021	978-4-04-736435-6	January 5, 2023	978-1-71-835810-2
1. "Proposal to a Gyaru"; 2. "Caressing a Gyaru"; 3. "The Heat of a Gyaru"; 4. "A Gyaru and Her Senpai"; 5. "A Gyaru and Her Patron"; 6. "An Outing with a Gyaru"; 7. "A Gyaru and an Old Copper Pot"; Extra Story: 1. "A Gyaru and Her Ring"; 2. "The Artisan and the Saleswoman"; Niigata Info Journal 1–2
2	October 15, 2021	978-4-04-736775-3	April 19, 2023	978-1-71-835811-9
8. "Shuu and His New Path"; 9. "A Gyaru and Indoor Camping"; 10. "A Gyaru on a Food Crawl"; 11. "A Misunderstanding with Shuu"; 12. "A Gyaru and Yahiko (Part 1)"; 13. "A Gyaru and Yahiko (Part 2)"; 14. "Squabble with a Gyaru"; Extra Story: 3. "Premonitions"; 4. "Good Intentions"; 5. "A Sweet Story"; 6. "Just the Way You Are"; Niigata Info Journal 3–4
3	August 12, 2022	978-4-04-737034-0	October 18, 2023	978-1-71-835812-6
15. "A Gyaru and Nanban Shrimp Miso Soup"; 16. "A Gyaru and an Uninvited Apprentice"; 17. "A Gyaru and Copperware Studies"; 18. "A Gyaru and Determination"; 19. "A Gyaru's Daily Life"; 20. "A Gyaru and Understanding"; 21. "A Gyaru and Nagaoka"; 22. "A Gyaru and the Head Clerk"; Extra Story: 7. "Qualifications"; 8. "Day 4 of Living Together"; 9. "Gap"; Niigata Info Journal 5
4	May 15, 2023	978-4-04-737462-1	December 18, 2024	978-1-71-835813-3
23. "First Meeting with a Gyaru"; 24. "A Gyaru and a Proposition"; 25. "A Gyaru and What's "Just Right""; 26. "A Gyaru Lunch Box Special"; 27. "A Gyaru and the Color Blue"; 28. "Asahi and Saku"; 29. "A Gyaru and Sado"; 30. "Shuu and Shiina"; Extra Story: 10. "The Cold Is a Blessing"; 11. "Surprisingly Fragile"
5	March 15, 2024	978-4-04-737650-2	March 5, 2025	978-1-71-835814-0
31. "A Gyaru and Veramping"; 32. "Shuu and the Goldsmith"; 33. "A Gyaru and a Kite Battle"; 34. "A Gyaru and a Workshop Tour"; 35. "A Gyaru and Camping"; 36. "A Gyaru and a Cat Pin"; 37. "A Gyaru and a History Lesson"; Extra Story: 12. "The Joy of Seeing Your Work Worn"; 13. "The Trials of Igarashi-san's Daily Life"; Special Feature: "Tsubame-sanjou's Industrial History"
6	October 15, 2024	978-4-04-738096-7	July 2, 2025	978-1-71-835815-7
38. "Shuu's Beginning"; 39. "Shuu's Layers"; 40. "Shuu's Big Moment"; 41. "A Gyaru and Red Snow Crab"; 42. "Shuu on a Winter Day"; 43. "A Gyaru and Miscommuniation"; 44. "Making Tools with Asahi"; Extra Story: 14. "Shuu's Reward"; 15. "Staring Eyes"; 16. "Surprisingly Sweet"
7	August 12, 2025	978-4-04-738391-3	June 3, 2026	978-1-71-835816-4
45. "Asahi Doesn't Want to Lose"; 46. "Asahi and Takahata"; 47. "Ordinary Things with a Gyaru"; 48. "Souichirou and Half a Century"; 49. "A Gyaru and Her Packaging"; 50. "A Gyaru and a Box Maker"; 51. "Asahi and the Bouquet"; Extra Story: 17. "A New Side"; 18. "A Special Spot"; 19. "Recruitment Drive"
8	May 15, 2026	978-4-04-500064-5	—	—

== Reception ==
The series was nominated for the eighth and ninth Next Manga Awards in 2022 and 2023, respectively, in the print category.

== See also ==
- Train to the End of the World, an anime television series with original character designs by Namo
