= Migi & Dali =

Japanese manga series

- First tankōbon volume cover

ミギとダリ (Migi to Dari)
- Genre: Mystery; Surreal comedy
- Manga
- Written by: Nami Sano
- Published by: Enterbrain
- Magazine: Harta
- Original run: July 15, 2017 – November 15, 2021
- Volumes: 7
- Anime television series
- Directed by: Mankyū
- Written by: Mankyū
- Music by: Hiroko Sebu
- Studio: Geek Toys; CompTown
- Licensed by: Crunchyroll: SEA: Plus Media Networks Asia
- Original network: AT-X, Tokyo MX, BS11
- Original run: October 2, 2023 – December 25, 2023
- Episodes: 13
- icon

Migi & Dali (ミギとダリ, Migi to Dari) is a Japanese manga series by Nami Sano. It was serialized in Enterbrain's seinen manga magazine Harta from July 2017 to November 2021 and was collected in seven tankōbon volumes. It was Sano's final work before she died of cancer in 2023. An anime television series adaptation by Geek Toys and CompTown aired from October to December 2023.

== Characters ==
Migi (ミギ)
Voiced by: Shun Horie (Japanese); Jackson Kirk (English)
Together with his brother Dali, he was adopted by the Sonoyama family posing as a boy named Hitori. He is the more emotional of the twins and unlike his more serious and manipulative identical twin brother Dali, he is gentle and sometimes tends to get distracted from the goal. He has a richer, smoother expression. His dominant hand is his right, which is what his name means.
Dali (ダリ, Dari)
Voiced by: Ayumu Murase (Japanese); Jackson Kirk (English)
Together with his brother Migi, he was adopted by the Sonoyama family posing as a boy named Hitori. He is the more rational of the twins, and calmly weighs things up with his brother feelings. But as the elder twin there are times when he is tough in front of Migi. His dominant hand is his left. He later gets a scar on his right cheek, making him now distinguishable from Migi.
Shunpei Akiyama (秋山 俊平, Akiyama Shunpei)
Voiced by: Shintarō Asanuma
A boy who is in the same class as "Hitori."
Maruta Tsutsumi (堤 丸太, Tsutsumi Maruta)
Voiced by: Shunsuke Takeuchi
A boy who lives in Origon Village who is near to "Hitori's" age
Eiji Ichijō (一条 瑛二, Ichijō Eiji)
Voiced by: Kengo Kawanishi
A thirteen-year-old dark-haired boy who attends the same school as "Hitori." He is in a more advanced class and is the class president. He is revealed to be the Migi and Dali's long-lost fraternal triplet brother who had been taken by the insanely jealous Reiko thirteen years ago, who passed him off as her own. Upon recalling that the blonde woman he had accidentally pushed to her death had told him to "come home to be with his brothers", Eiji turns on Reiko and stabs her to death, angry that his entire life had been a complete fabrication and to bring her "true peace and perfection" in death. After burning the entire mansion down via gasoline, he tries to convince Dali to get his vengeance for killing their mother Metry eight years ago, only to be badly injured from a chandelier falling on top of him. He then confesses his sins to the police.
Yōko Sonoyama (園山 洋子, Sonoyama Yōko)
Voiced by: Kotono Mitsuishi (Japanese); Katabelle Ansari (English)
Adoptive mother of "Hitori" who loves playing with his hair. She dons multiple wigs of different hair colors and styles.
Osamu Sonoyama (園山 修, Sonoyama Osamu)
Voiced by: Takashi Matsuyama (Japanese); Shawn Motes (English)
Adoptive father of "Hitori" who is in his sixties like his wife.
Metry (メトリー, Metorī)
Voiced by: Sumire Morohoshi
Late mother of Migi and Dali whose mysterious murder is what drives her identical teenage sons to avenge her by an means necessary. It is revealed that she had been a housemaid to the unstable perfectionist Reiko, who had used her to bear Akira's illegitimate children who are, in fact, triplets rather than identical twins; the middle one having grown up as Eiji.
Micchan (みっちゃん)
Voiced by: Kimiko Saitō
Also known as Mrs. Mitsuyama, she is a housemaid who works in several homes in Origon Village, but was ultimately stabbed to death by Reiko who then framed "Hitori" for it.
Reiko Ichijō (一条 怜子, Ichijō Reiko)
Voiced by: Romi Park
The "mother" of Eiji and Karen Ichijō, who is mentally unstable to her twisted desire for ultimate perfection and inability to conceive. She had used her housemaid Metry to make love to her husband, wanting to pass off her illegitimate children as her own. Out of sheer jealously and hatred, she had taken the middle triplet from Metry and named him Eiji. Once her dark, insane nature is revealed, she is stabbed to death by a furious Eiji and left in her bedroom as Eiji lets the blue flames consume them both with the mansion.
Akira Ichijō (一条 瑛, Ichijō Akira)
Voiced by: Tokuyoshi Kawashima
Father of Eiji and Karen Ichijō, who is revealed to be the father of triplets Migi, Eiji and Dali. He is completely unaware that Karen is not biologically his. He is heartbroken to learn his wife's instability and is finally reunited with his long-lost triplet sons.
Karen Ichijō (一条 華怜, Ichijō Karen)
Voiced by: Akira Sekine
Younger sister of Eiji, who was actually taken from her own mother as an infant to pass off as their daughter along with Eiji.

== Media ==
=== Manga ===
Migi & Dali is written and illustrated by Nami Sano. It was serialized in Enterbrain's Harta manga magazine from July 2017 to November 2021 and was collected in seven tankōbon volumes.

No.	Japanese release date	Japanese ISBN
1	May 15, 2018	978-4-04-734836-3
2	September 15, 2018	978-4-04-735350-3
3	August 10, 2019	978-4-04-735623-8
4	February 15, 2020	978-4-04-736022-8
5	October 15, 2020	978-4-04-736112-6
6	July 15, 2021	978-4-04-736634-3
7	December 15, 2021	978-4-04-736846-0

=== Anime ===
On December 13, 2021, an anime adaptation was announced. It was later revealed to be a television series produced by Geek Toys and CompTown, and directed and written by Mankyū, with Mamoru Enomoto serving as assistant director, Ayumi Nishibata designing the characters, and Hiroko Sebu composing the music. It aired from October 2 to December 25, 2023, on AT-X and other networks. Soraru and Rib performed the opening theme song "Yūmaga Doki" (ユウマガドキ), while Nulbarich performed the ending theme song "Skyline". Crunchyroll licensed the series. Plus Media Networks Asia has licensed the series in Southeast Asia.

==== Episodes ====
No.	Title	Directed by (Note: Information is taken from the ending credits of each episode.)	Written by	Storyboarded by	Original release date
1	"Migi and Dali"; Transliteration: "Migi to Dali" (Japanese: ミギとダリ)	Mamoru Enomoto	Mankyu	Mankyu	October 2, 2023
A blue-eyed young woman with waist-length blonde hair is seen lying bleeding on the ground while holding a snowflake button. In December 1989, a blonde boy, Hitori is adopted by an elderly, childless couple, Yōko and Osamu Sonoyama. Unbeknownst to them, Hitori is being portrayed by identical twin brothers Migi and Dali. Because the couple can only adopt one child, they use their identical appearances to pretend to be one person while covertly switching places without the couple noticing. Migi and Dali grant the couple's dreams of having a child; they help Yōko bake a cherry pie and ride on Osamu's shoulders. Migi and Dali are pleased they have won the Sonoyamas over and everything is going as they have been planning.
2	"Welcome Party"; Transliteration: "Werukamu Pātī" (Japanese: ウェルカムパーティー)	Naoki Murata	Shogo Yasukawa	Tomoe Makino	October 9, 2023
In 1983, a young Migi and Dali are seen standing on a bluff above Origon Village while holding a snowflake button, with an unmarked grave positioned behind them. In 1990, 13-year-old twins, Migi and Dali, acting under their alias as one person named Hitori, used their room as base of operations to investigate the people of Origon Village. While the couple is out planning for Hitori's welcoming party, the twins, searching around the house, find a shelf full of colored wigs laden with a particular odor, which they interpret as the Sonoyamas hiding something. They later find a metal object in the garden shed, which believe is a machine that will scalp their son to use his hair to make a wig. During the welcome party, they meet neighbors including Mrs. Ichijo and her children Eiji and Karen, Mrs. Tsutsumi and her grandson Maruta, and Shunpei Akiyama. Migi and Dali eventually discover that the metal object that the couple had been hiding was a new bicycle for their son. They learn that the wigs they found in the couple's closet were synthetic wigs used by Mrs. Sonoyama. A flashback reveals that eight years ago, they and their mother Metry lived in Origon Village. For reasons unknown to them, she disappeared on the night of her murder and they later found her dead in the village with a button as their only clue. Migi and Dali's return to Origon Village via being adopted by the Sonoyamas is now understood as part of a plot to find and kill their mother's murderer.
3	"Let's Make Friends"; Transliteration: "Tomodachi o Tsukurō" (Japanese: ともだちをつくろう)	Tsuyoshi Tobita	Yuko Fukuda	Naotaka Hayashi	October 16, 2023
Migi and Dali's earliest memories were of them living with their mother hiding in a room with paisley wallpaper (that they describe as water fleas). They spent time playing under a bed and making doodles on the wallpaper. In December 1982, they are now living in a tent rather than that hidden room, though their mother still speaks fondly of her love for Origon Village. Migi and Dali bury their mother, finding a snowflake button in her hand, their one clue. In 1990, the Sonoyama's enroll their son in boy scouts. The two boys, continuing to pose as Hitori, befriend one of the members of the boy scouts named Akiyama. They use this friendship as a means to easily access Akiyama's home as part of their investigation. Dali keeps Akiyama distracted while Migi searches the house, finding that the house has paisley wallpaper but not the wallpaper they are looking for. They are invited to play with Maruta at his house. This time Migi distracts Maruta while Dali searches the house. Maruta turns out to be a horrible friend, and they find no rooms with paisley wallpaper. Dali sees Maruta treating Migi horribly and says cruel things; when the opportunity presents, Dali switches places and begins hitting Maruta but is stopped by Migi. Returning home, they meet the maid Mrs. Mitsuyama, who asks to be called Micchan.
4	"Be a Good Student"; Transliteration: "Orikō-san ni Narō" (Japanese: おりこうさんになろう)	Shintaro Inokawa, Mamoru Enomoto	Momoka Toyota	Shintaro Inokawa	October 23, 2023
Upon learning that Micchan has been to all the houses in the village, they are eager to learn from her which houses have paisley wallpaper. Though she says it would be unprofessional for her to talk about other people's homes, Migi and Dali trick Micchan into telling them that the Ichijo home has a room with the wallpaper they are looking for. They try to make friends with Eiji at school, but Eiji is in an advanced class while they are in a lower-ranked class with Akiyama and Maruta. They aim to get high grades, splitting the courses so they can each concentrate on certain subjects, but Migi struggles with his grades. While Migi takes the primary role of playing Hitori at school, Dali wears a wig and dresses as a female student so that he can study at school without being mistaken as Hitori. Migi tells Dali that he has fallen in love with a female student, and Dali is surprised to learn that the student Migi has become enamored with is him in his female disguise. Seeing that Migi's affection for her might be used as motivation for him to study harder, Dali plays up his role in this character, giving the name Sali. Unexpectedly, Migi succeeds in getting 100% on his exams to be able to earn a date with Sali. Not wanting to continue the false relationship nor hurt Migi's feelings, the two go on a date during which Dali tells Migi she will be moving far away. Later, Eiji sees the high grade from Hitori. While inspecting students' belongings while other students are in gym class, Eiji finds the necklace made from the snowflake button in Hitori's clothes.
5	"Water Flea's Song"; Transliteration: "Mijinko no Uta" (Japanese: ミジンコの歌)	Ryuichi Baba, Ori Yasukawa	Mankyu	Mitsuko Kase	October 30, 2023
The Ichijo family invites the Sonoyama family to their home for dinner. Knowing that Hitori is likely wearing a necklace with the snowflake button, Eiji confronts him, showing his pajamas with the missing button. Dali manages to cut the necklace off of Migi before he is asked to take off his shirt to prove he does not have the button. Eiji commands his dog to find the missing button, and to prevent Dali from being exposed, Migi admits to having taken the button upon finding it in the bathroom of their home. Disturbed by this theft, Reiko suggests that Hitori stay with them for a while to re-educate him. Migi is locked in a hidden room where Eiji asks him how he obtained a button from his pajamas that was lost to him eight years ago. Migi and Dali discover that the room Migi is being held in is the room with the wallpaper they have been looking for. Knowing that this was the room where they lived hidden with their mother, they suspect someone in the Ichijo family murdered their mother. Dali is met by Micchan who helps him search the Ichijo home for more secrets. Dali finds a photo with their mother's image on it, and Micchan suggests that she was the housekeeper for the Ichijo family. In the bedroom, they find a picture frame that reveals a hidden attic. Dali and Micchan are shocked to discover a diorama of Origon Village, with dolls of all the residents as well as pictures and data about all the villagers. They both conclude the Ichijos are surveilling all of Origon Village. Upon hearing someone is coming, Micchan tells Dali to hide. Dali later comes out and finds the doll of Micchan beheaded.
6	"Who Killed the Parent Bird?"; Transliteration: "Dare ga Oyadori Koroshita no?" (Japanese: 誰が親鳥殺したの?)	Ryuichi Baba, Fumihiro Ueno	Yuko Fukuda	Mamoru Enomoto	November 6, 2023
Still captive in the Ichijo home, Migi tries to be the perfect toddler to gain Reiko's affection so that he might learn more of the Ichijo family secrets. Please by Hitori's progress, Reiko allows him to eat dinner with Eiji and Karen. Reiko says this will be the end of the "conditioning program" and will allow Hitori to go home tomorrow. Knowing this is the last night they will be staying in the Ichijo home, they aim to learn who in the Ichijo family killed their mother. They decide to dress Migi as the ghost of their mother, hoping that the reactions of the family members to the ghost will reveal the culprit. Akira reacts by embracing her and calling her Metry. They assume from this that she was his mistress, suggesting to them that Akira may be their father. Reiko sees Migi dressed as Metry and tries to attack the figure with scissors. Given that both of the parents reacted to Metry as if she were still alive, they conclude that neither are the murderer. Eiji comes to the kitchen and sees Metry as a ghost, running away in fear. Migi and Dali struggle to comprehend how Eiji came to murder their mother since he was five years old at that time. Hitori is returned to the Sonoyama home with a warm welcome. At the Ichijo home, Eiji is unwell and begins to see memories of the missing button and Metry.
7	"It Wasn't A Ghost"; Transliteration: "Obake Janakatta" (Japanese: おばけじゃなかった)	Ryuichi Baba, Masato Kitagawa	Shogo Yasukawa	Jin Tamamura	November 13, 2023
Knowing Eiji killed their mother, the twins aim to find his motive. While Migi is studying, Dali reprises his role as the female student Sali to approach Eiji. Dali blackmails Eiji into giving him childhood photos. In one photo from December 24, 1982, a five-year-old Eiji is shown wearing pajamas with snowflake buttons, and in a photo from the following day, there is a photo of him with the button missing. Eiji tells Dali he does not remember what happened to the button. Migi finds the dolphin pendant he gave to Sali and believes she has returned. Upon finding Dali with Eiji, Dali tells Migi that she is now dating Eiji, leaving Migi heartbroken. At the Ichijo home, Dali uses regressive hypnosis on Eiji to reveal how and why he killed their mother. Following advice Migi received that he ought to fight for the one he loves, Migi climbs to the second story of the Ichijo house where Dali (dressed as Sali) has Eiji in a hypnotic state. Eiji pushes Migi out the window, but Dali saves him from falling. Migi begins to realize something and bites his hand before falling to the ground. Still in a hypnotic state, Eiji finally remembers what happened the night Metry died. He describes how Metry came to him through the window and tried to tell him something, but Eiji became scared and pushed her away. Falling from the window, Metry grabbed the snowflake button. Eiji brought his mother to the window to show her what happened, but by then Metry's body was gone (Metry left and soon died and then Migi and Dali found her), so his mother told him it was a ghost, which he came to believe. Returning to the Sonoyama home after learning the truth from Eiji, Dali hopes to tell Migi this so they can plot their revenge. Upon returning home, Migi grabs Dali's hand to see the bitemark. Migi becomes angry at Dali for having deceived him about Sali.
8	"Two ≠ One"; Transliteration: "Futari ≠ Hitori" (Japanese: ふたり≠ひとり)	Tomoe Makino	Momoka Toyota	RoydenB	November 20, 2023
Upset that Dali tricked him, Migi has been living covertly at Akiyama's house. Dali comes to repair his relationship with Migi asking him to help avenge their mother. Migi tells Dali he no longer cares about revenge and refuses to leave. Dali decides to continue with his plans to kill Eiji, formulating a plot to kill him during the local Halloween costume contest for which Eiji is favored to win every year. As the Halloween costume contest commences, Eiji presents as sad and listless such that Dali convinces everyone that he is dressed as a beggar and his intense lack of expression shows how dedicated he is to staying in character. Eiji wins the contest and is granted a seat at the winner's throne where Dali planted a pumpkin that will fall on him when he sits. Eiji refuses the award, and Dali begins to see that Eiji is depressed for what he did to Metry. The throne goes to the second-place winners, Akiyama and Migi. As Migi walks on stage to claim the throne, Dali runs to stop him before the trap he has set kills him. Before Dali makes it to the stage, Eiji steps in to save Migi and is knocked unconscious by the pumpkin. Eiji is later seen in the hospital unconscious with his mother watching over him.
9	"Kill Kill Kill Kill Kill"; Transliteration: "Korosu Korosu Korosu Korosu Korosu" (Japanese: コロスコロスコロスコロスコロス)	Naoki Murata	Yuko Fukuda	Tomoe Makino	November 27, 2023
Migi learns from Akiyama that Eiji has returned home from the hospital. Seeing that Dali is preoccupied with distress from having nearly killed his brother, Migi goes to visit Eiji posing as Dali's female disguise. Migi learns from Eiji that he stepped in to protect Hitori because he feels a need to atone for the sin of having pushed a woman out of his window to her death. Showing the diorama of the village in the attic of the Ichijo house, Eiji believes that his mother has been trying to cover up her son's crime by surveilling the village or that Metry was hiding somewhere. Reiko finds them in the attic and postures toward harming Migi. Eiji tackles his mother to allow Migi to escape, but Reiko grabs his hair, pulling off the wig to reveal him. Migi hides from Reiko in Karen's room where he learns that Reiko is not Karen and Eiji's real mother. Reiko goes to the Sonoyama house where she drugs the Sonoyama parents and ties up Dali. Migi returns to the house to alert his brother but is tied up by Reiko as well. She tells them that she will kill just one of them, and Dali asks that she kill him because he would not be able to live without Migi. As Reiko is choking Dali to death, Micchan arrives to prevent her. She reveals that when Reiko tried to kill her by burying her alive, Karen rescued her. She later found Karen's biological mother and learned from her that Reiko is a barren woman. Micchan unties Migi and Dali, she tries to tell them something about Eiji but is then stabbed in the neck by Reiko. Migi and Dali flee the village by bicycle, staying the night in a shrine. Dali suggests that they live there, never to return to Origon village, and throws the bicycle into a culvert. Migi begs for them to return, enjoying the life they had in the Sonoyama home, and the two engage in a fistfight in which Dali pummels Migi. Dali relents and they to the village. At the Sonoyama house, Mr. and Mrs. Sonoyama are interrogated by police about their son with the bloodied knife used to stab Micchan seen in a bag as collected evidence.
10	"Beavers vs Mother Ichijo"; Transliteration: "Bībāzu vs Ichijō Haha" (Japanese: ビーバーズ vs 一条母)	Ryuichi Baba	Shogo Yasukawa	Naotaka Hayashi	December 4, 2023
With Reiko framing the Sonoyama's son for murdering Micchan, Migi and Dali enlist the help of Akiyama and Maruta to help reveal Reiko as the true murderer. Dali reveals himself to the two classmates, explaining to them that he and Migi have been pretending to be a single person. The four enact their plan with Akiyama dressing in his bird costume to distract the police who are searching for Hitori allowing Maruta and the twins to access the Ichijo house through Karen's bedroom window. As they are crossing on a rope to get to Karen's room, they discover that there is razor wire below them. Dali fears that he will fall to his death as the tree branch supporting the rope begins to break, but Migi saves him. Upon arriving to Karen's room, they find a romance happening between Karen and Maruta. Karen says Reiko favors Eiji much more than her since Eiji looks like their father, they ask Karen what is the deal with Reiko, Karen explains to them that Reiko wants everything to perfect, both her family, the Village and her life. Karen provides a distraction to bring her father into her room so the other three can get Eiji and use him as a hostage to get Reiko to confess to her crimes. They go to the hidden room in the house where Reiko has taken him to be re-educated, the three boys find Eiji in a crib behaving as a baby, drooling and wearing a diaper. As Migi and Dali carry Eiji, they are unsure what they feel for him after he killed their mother but saved Migi two times. They succeed in making him a hostage. When Reiko finds them, she calls them Metry's children and agrees to tell them the story of Metry, meaning that she will tell them the story of a devil.
11	"Upside-Down Woman"; Transliteration: "Saka Sama no Onna" (Japanese: さかさまの女)	Ryuichi Baba	Momoka Toyota	Shintaro Inokawa	December 11, 2023
Reiko tells the children about Metry, explaining how she came to work in their home as a maid after Reiko married Akira. Reiko was initially helpful to Metry, and they became close friends. Upon Reiko finding out that she is unlikely to bear children, Reiko makes Metry pretend to be her in bed so that Metry can become pregnant by Akira. Later, Reiko finds out that Akira has fallen in love with Metry, knowing that she has been the one in bed with him, this made Reiko insane as she wanted herself and her life to be perfect. Reiko tells the children that she had Eiji around the same time that Metry had twins. After telling this story, Reiko takes away the video camera and takes Eiji away from Migi and Dali, but Eiji pushes her to the ground below. Eiji finally recalls the night when Metry came to his window; she told him to come home to be with his brothers, Eiji tells Migi and Dali they are brothers. In scenes from the past thirteen years ago, Metry is seen after giving birth to triplets. Reiko, who had been feigning pregnancy, takes away the middle triplet with black hair and names Eiji as her own child. After this, Reiko locks Metry along with Migi and Dali in the room, and after living for a few years in the house eventually they escaped, Metry couldn't forget her third son and then went to get him. Returning to the present, Migi and Dali are shocked that Eiji are their brother and they were actually triplets this whole time, they struggle to accept this. Eiji asks where Metry is, unaware that he had killed her and they inform him what he did to her that day. Eiji goes downstairs to take care of Reiko. Later, they including Akira, Maruta and Karen hear her scream in the hidden room. Upon going to her, they find she has trapped them in the hidden room. Reiko tells Eiji to pack so that they can run away together. Eiji tricks Reiko and stabs her. Eiji is affected that he lived in a lie and killing his real mother, he then takes the diorama Reiko made of the town and Ichijo family and sets it on fire, burning away the "perfect family".
12	"Our Revenge"; Transliteration: "Bokura no Fukushū" (Japanese: ぼくらの復讐)	Ryuichi Baba	Yuko Rukuda	Yoko Kanamori	December 18, 2023
With the mansion being consumed by blue fire, Migi and Dali try to get out with Karen, Maruta and Akira, but are rescued by Akiyama and they all escape from the house, but Akiyama Eiji is still in the house. In her bedroom, Reiko is dead and Eiji lies next to her, reminiscing about all the "perfect" times they all had together but laments that the blonde women he had accidentally killed had been his birth mother. Realizing that Eiji is like them, Dali runs in and confronts Eiji who calmly tells his long-lost elder triplet brother that he is sorry for taking their mother away from them, and that he intends to make amends by allowing himself to be killed by him, Migi joins them and tries to persuade Dali to stop but Dali says his revenge is to make Eiji live with his sins as Eiji is now the only family they have left. Dali drags Eiji but Eiji causes Dali to fall down and both Migi and Eiji falls too. Micchan's spirit saves them by removing the flames, and they both help Eiji up from under a chandelier that landed on top of him and they tell him to go home with them. Outside, they watch Karen, Maruta and their father Akira with the police while hiding. Migi decides to come clean to the Sonoyamas and wants Eiji to come back with them, but Eiji declines as cheery pie is "too sweet" for him. He then confessing his crimes including taking the blame for Micchan's murder to the police and neighbors. Eiji is arrested as Migi and Dali look on from their hiding place, with the latter now sporting a scar on his right cheek, making it no longer possible not to tell the two apart.
13	"Migi and Dali"; Transliteration: "Migi to Dari" (Japanese: ミギとダリ)	Ryuichi Baba	Yasukawa Shogo	Mitsuko Kase	December 25, 2023
Akiyama narrates about the changes that happened since the Ichijo family home burned down. Eiji was sentenced to juvenile detention for confessing to the crimes despite the unburned video of Reiko's confession and Akira's desperate defense of his son. Due to the scar on Dali's face from the fire, he is no longer able to switch with Migi to play the role of Hitori. Migi suggests they reveal themselves to the Sonoyama, but Dali would rather live as his shadow. Akiyama asks Migi about continuing as Hitori, and Migi is unsure about what Dali really wants. He wants them to be together though recognizes they are different. Upon the Sonoyamas speculating about Hitori's future, including having a lover in the future, Dali has a bad dream in which he spends his life under the table. Upon waking on Christmas morning, there are two Christmas gifts under the tree. The Sonoyamas says it is for a food-loving, creative child and another child who is intellectual and sensitive, they reveal they know it is two of them as it took them a while to notice the difference and they invite both to sit at the table to eat. Migi tells Dali that though they are different, one thing that will not change is that their happiness will be each other's happiness. The boys reveal themselves to them and all of them becomes a happy family. The story moves several years in the future to March 1993: Osamu and Akiyama are bird watching together, Migi is shown with short hair doing artwork, Maruta has become tall and handsome, and Dali is shown with longer hair studying. As the twins prepare to make cherry pie, Micchan's spirit writes messages in the flour dusting. The Ichijo family arrives with Eiji out of detention, and the three brothers are able to eat cherry pie together. Migi and Dali show Eiji their mother's grave, and Eiji tells his brothers about his hope that when he dies, he wants to meet his mother and tell her that he lived an imperfect yet happy life. Dali leaves to study at a school and Migi stays, they have different paths; Dali will study and Migi is an up-and-coming avant-garde artist. Their hearts, no matter how far apart, are always connected. In the end scene, Micchan's spirit writes on the ground; In memory of Sano Nami.
