= Aki Irie =

Japanese manga artist

- 入江 亜季
- Pronunciation: いりえ あき
- Born: Marugame, Japan
- Occupation: Manga artist
- Years active: 2004–present
- Notable work: Ran and the Gray World; Go with the Clouds, North-by-Northwest

Aki Irie (入江 亜季, Irie Aki) is a Japanese manga artist, best known for her work Ran and the Gray World. She was born in Marugame, Kagawa.

== Career ==
Before starting her career as a manga artist, Irie studied Chinese literature in university.

Irie made a few doujinshi before her 2004 debut with Albertina (アルベルティーナ) published in the magazine, Comic Beam. In 2006, she began her first serialized manga in the same magazine, Gunjou Gakusha (群青学舎). The series was a compilation of short stories centering on the colour blue, and resulted in four published volumes which also included her first work, Albertina.

In 2008, Irie's first long-running manga Ran and the Gray World was serialized in the magazine Fellows!. In 2013, Fellows! magazine was rebranded and named Harta. In 2016, her second long-running series Go with the Clouds, North-by-Northwest (北北西に曇と往け, Hokuhokusei ni Kumo to Ike) began serialization in Harta. Go with the Clouds, North-by-Northwest moved serialization to Blue Knight following its establishment in April 2021.

== Works ==
- Gunjou Gakusha (群青学舎) (2004-2008) – serialized in Comic Beam, 4 volumes published by Enterbrian
- Kodama no Tani Ôritsu Daigaku Sôrangeki (コダマの谷 王立大学騒乱劇) (2006) – serialized in Comic Beam, published as a one-shot by Enterbrain
- Ran and the Gray World (乱と灰色の世界, Ran to Haiiro no Sekai) (2008-2015) – serialized in Fellows! followed by Harta since 2013, 7 volumes published by Enterbrain followed by Kadokawa
- Go with the Clouds, North-by-Northwest (北北西に曇と往け, Hokuhokusei ni Kumo to Ike) (2016-ongoing) – previously serialized in Harta (2016-2021), now serialized in Blue Knight. Volumes published by Kadokawa
- Tabi (The Journey of Life) (旅) (2022) – one-shot collection

== Awards ==
In 2011, Ran and the Gray World was selected as a recommended work by the jury committee in the manga division of the 15th Japan Media Arts Festival. In 2019, Go with the Clouds, North-by-Northwest was nominated for the Manga Taishō award.
