= Ran and the Gray World =

Japanese manga series

- First tankōbon volume cover

乱と灰色の世界 (Ran to Haiiro no Sekai)
- Genre: Supernatural, romance
- Manga
- Written by: Aki Irie
- Published by: Enterbrain
- English publisher: NA: Viz Media
- Magazine: Harta
- Original run: December 15, 2008 – April 15, 2015
- Volumes: 7
- icon

Ran and the Gray World (Japanese: 乱と灰色の世界, Hepburn: Ran to Haiiro no Sekai) is a Japanese manga series written and illustrated by Aki Irie. It was serialized in Harta from December 2008 to April 2015 and published in seven tankōbon volumes.

== Publication ==
Written and illustrated by Aki Irie, Ran and the Gray World began serialization in Enterbrain's magazine Harta (then called Fellows!) on December 15, 2008. The series concluded on April 15, 2015. It was published in seven tankōbon volumes.

At Anime Boston 2018, Viz Media announced they licensed the series for English publication.

=== Volume list ===
No.	Original release date	Original ISBN	English release date	English ISBN
1	November 16, 2009	978-4-04-726145-7	November 20, 2018	978-1-97-470362-3
2	November 15, 2010	978-4-04-726849-4	February 19, 2019	978-1-97-470363-0
3	July 15, 2011	978-4-04-727383-2	May 21, 2019	978-1-97-470364-7
4	July 14, 2012	978-4-04-728116-5	August 20, 2019	978-1-97-470365-4
5	September 14, 2013	978-4-04-729164-5	November 19, 2019	978-1-97-470366-1
6	April 14, 2014	978-4-04-729576-6	February 18, 2020	978-1-97-470367-8
7	June 15, 2015	978-4-04-730582-3	May 19, 2020	978-1-97-470368-5

== Reception ==
Jason Thompson of Otaku USA recommended the series, praising it for its art, plot, and main protagonist. Sarah of Anime UK News also gave the first volume praise, calling it a "terrifically energetic and exuberant [start]" and the artwork "exceptional". Sean Gaffney of A Case Suitable for Treatment also gave the series praise for the art and plot. Chris Beveridge of The Fandom Post praised the artwork, while criticizing the main protagonist, calling her a "borderline brat". Anna Neatrour of Manga Report stated that despite the fact that some of the situations in the book made her uneasy, they enjoyed it and wanted to read more. As part of Anime News Network's Fall 2018 manga guide, Rebecca Silverman, Amy McNulty, Faye Hopper, and Teresa Navarro reviewed the series for the website. Each rated the series from three and a half to two and a half out of five. They all collectively praised the artwork, while finding the story a bit uncomfortable, despite enjoying it overall.
