= The Hitman Stans =

Japanese manga series

- First tankōbon volume cover

殺し屋の推し (Koroshiya no Oshi)
- Genre: Action, comedy
- Manga
- Written by: Rintarou Ohshima
- Published by: Enterbrain
- English publisher: NA: Yen Press
- Imprint: Harta Comix
- Magazine: Harta
- Original run: November 15, 2022 – present
- Volumes: 4
- icon

The Hitman's Fave (Japanese: 殺し屋の推し, Hepburn: Koroshiya no Oshi), localized for North America as The Hitman Stans, is a Japanese manga series written and illustrated by Rintarou Ohshima. It began serialization in Enterbrain's seinen manga magazine Harta in November 2022.

== Plot ==
Owaru Endou is the most feared assassin in the criminal underworld and a top enforcer of the Fujisan-kai syndicate. Seen as a ruthless killing machine, Owaru lives a life of violence and secrecy, until one day he discovers a new purpose as a devoted fan of Kaori "Kaorin" Minaboshi, an underground idol from the group Rosaceae. Attending her concerts becomes the one source of light in his life, leading Owaru to believe that his bloodstained hands make him unworthy of supporting her. Determined to become someone he can be proud of, he abruptly retires from being a hitman in search of a fresh start.

However, Owaru's attempt at peaceful idol fandom is threatened when figures from his past refuse to let him walk away from the underworld. As danger closes in on both himself and the world he now cherishes, Owaru is forced to confront his past if he truly wants to move on.

== Publication ==
Written and illustrated by Rintarou Ohshima, The Hitman Stans began serialization in Enterbrain's seinen manga magazine Harta on November 15, 2022. Its chapters have been compiled into five tankōbon volumes as of October 2026. The series is licensed in English by Yen Press.

No.	Original release date	Original ISBN	North American release date	North American ISBN
1	November 15, 2023	978-4-04-737638-0	June 24, 2025	979-8-8554-1623-7
2	April 15, 2024	978-4-04-737943-5	October 28, 2025	979-8-8554-1835-4
3	February 15, 2025	978-4-04-738233-6	June 23, 2026	979-8-8554-2512-3
4	January 15, 2026	978-4-04-738568-9	—	—
5	October 15, 2026	978-4-04-500250-2	—	—
