= Vlad Drăculea (manga) =

Japanese manga series

- First tankōbon volume cover

ヴラド・ドラクラ (Vurado Dorakura)
- Genre: Action; Historical
- Manga
- Written by: Akiyo Ohkubo
- Published by: Enterbrain
- Magazine: Harta
- Original run: May 15, 2017 – June 15, 2026
- Volumes: 10
- icon

Vlad Drăculea (Japanese: ヴラド・ドラクラ, Hepburn: Vurado Dorakura) is a Japanese manga series written and illustrated by Akiyo Ohkubo based on the historical figure of Vlad the Impaler. It was serialized in Enterbrain's seinen manga magazine Harta from May 2017 to June 2026, with its chapters collected in ten tankōbon volumes as of July 2026.

== Plot ==
Explores the life of Vlad III as he rises up into a feared monarch and defender of his land.

== Publication ==
Written and illustrated by Akiyo Ohkubo, Vlad Drăculea serialzed in Enterbrain's seinen manga magazine Harta from May 15, 2017, till June 15, 2026. Enterbrain has collected its chapters into individual tankōbon volumes. The first volume was released on February 15, 2018. As of July 15, 2026, ten volumes have been released.

In France, the manga is licensed by Soleil.

=== Volumes ===
| No. | Release date | ISBN |
|---|---|---|
| 1 | February 15, 2018 | 978-4-04734-837-0 |
| 2 | February 15, 2019 | 978-4-04735-355-8 |
| 3 | February 15, 2020 | 978-4-04735-798-3 |
| 4 | February 15, 2021 | 978-4-04736-277-2 |
| 5 | November 15, 2021 | 978-4-04736-769-2 |
| 6 | November 15, 2022 | 978-4-04737-047-0 |
| 7 | November 15, 2023 | 978-4-04737-655-7 |
| 8 | November 15, 2024 | 978-4-04738-098-1 |
| 9 | November 14, 2025 | 978-4-04738-562-7 |
| 10 | July 15, 2026 | 978-4-04500-115-4 |

== Reception ==
Faustine Lillaz of Planete BD described the story as having a good introduction and a realistic and intelligent tone, and praised Ohkubo's drawings, calling them very clever, and beautiful, which help to enhance the story. The third volume is sometimes difficult to understand with certain twists or sequences, and as of the fourth volume, the battles are well-paced, very violent, the two characters are attractive and stating "the story is therefore nervous, the graphics bring it to life with relative realism and the whole thing is extremely entertaining." Manga News does not consider the manga to be another vampire work based on Vlad III, but rather a historical interpretation of this man's life. Some elements in the second volume move a little too fast, but they feel a certain rigor and a somewhat dark atmosphere which contribute quite a bit to the immersion.

In a review of the first two volumes, Manga Sanctuary praised Ohkubo's manga, described the first volume with a heavy atmosphere of conspiracy and power conflict and feels the palpable tension between the various heroes which they use calculated strategies to take down their opponents, stating that the manga is a very enriching and interesting read that makes the viewer fascinated by the outcome of the story with unimaginable curiosity. rated the second volume 9 out of 10; they called its historical story complicated In terms of rhythm, the volume follows a steady rhythm, events follow one another, the tension and stakes are building, which gives everything a haunting atmosphere.
