= Hotel Metsäpeura e Yōkoso =

Japanese manga series

- First tankōbon volume cover

ホテル・メッツァペウラへようこそ (Hoteru Mettsapeura e Yōkoso)
- Genre: Drama
- Manga
- Written by: Seira Fukuta
- Published by: Enterbrain
- Imprint: Harta Comix
- Magazine: Harta
- Original run: October 15, 2020 – present
- Volumes: 9
- icon

Hotel Metsäpeura e Yōkoso (Japanese: ホテル・メッツァペウラへようこそ, Hepburn: Hoteru Mettsapeura e Yōkoso; lit. 'Welcome to Hotel Metsäpeura') is a Japanese manga series written and illustrated by Seira Fukuta. It began serialization in Enterbrain's seinen manga magazine Harta in October 2020.

== Plot ==
Set in a hotel in Lapland, the series focuses on Jun, a mysterious, tattooed young man, who arrives at the hotel with no money or family. The old men who run the hotel, Adolf and Kusta, accept Jun into the hotel and offer him a job, to which Jun accepts.

== Characters ==
Jun (ジュン)
Voiced by: Daisuke Kasuya (voice comic)
Adolf (アードルフ, Ādorufu)
Voiced by: Kenyu Horiuchi (voice comic)
Kustaa (クスタ, Kusuta)
Voiced by: Akio Otsuka (voice comic)

== Media ==
=== Manga ===
Written and illustrated by Seira Fukuta, Hotel Metsäpeura e Yōkoso began serialization in Enterbrain's seinen manga magazine Harta on October 15, 2020. Its chapters have been compiled into nine tankōbon volumes as of November 2026.

No.	Release date	ISBN
1	January 15, 2022	978-4-04-736767-8
2	March 15, 2022	978-4-04-736766-1
3	October 15, 2022	978-4-04-737183-5
4	September 15, 2023	978-4-04-737644-1
5	June 14, 2024	978-4-04-737957-2
6	January 15, 2025	978-4-04-738092-9
7	December 15, 2025	978-4-04-738385-2
8	May 15, 2026	978-4-04-500061-4
9	November 13, 2026	978-4-04-500248-9

=== Other ===
In October 2022, in commemoration of the release of the third volume, peel-off advertisements were featured at Ikebukuro Station. In February 2023, a voice comic adaptation was released. It featured voice performances from Daisuke Kasuya, Kenyu Horiuchi and Akio Otsuka.

== Reception ==
The series was ranked eleventh in the Nationwide Bookstore Employees' Recommended Comics list of 2023. It was ranked fifteenth in the 2024 edition of the list.
