= Go with the Clouds, North-by-Northwest =

Japanese manga series

- First tankōbon volume cover

北北西に曇と往け (Hokuhokusei ni Kumo to Yuke)
- Genre: Adventure; Drama; Mystery
- Manga
- Written by: Aki Irie
- Published by: Enterbrain (2016–2025); Yukiwarisō (2025–)
- English publisher: NA: Vertical
- Magazine: Harta (2016–2021); Aokishi (2021–2025)
- Original run: March 14, 2016 – present
- Volumes: 7
- Anime television series
- Directed by: Takashi Sano (chief); Yōsuke Kubo
- Written by: Takashi Sano
- Studio: Qzil.la
- Licensed by: Netflix (streaming rights)
- Original network: TBS
- Original run: 2027 – scheduled
- icon

Go with the Clouds, North-by-Northwest (Japanese: 北北西に曇と往け, Hepburn: Hokuhokusei ni Kumo to Yuke) is a Japanese manga series written and illustrated by Aki Irie. It started serialization in Enterbrain's Harta before moving to Aokishi following its establishment in April 2021. As of February 2024, the chapters of the series have been collected into seven volumes. An anime television series adaptation produced by Qzil.la is set to premiere in 2027.

== Plot ==
Kei Miyama is a Japanese teenager living in Iceland with his grandfather. He works as a private investigator, using his supernatural ability to communicate with machinery. The story follows Kei as he solves cases for various clients, often requiring him to track people down. At the same time, a deeper mystery is unfolding—one that involves his elusive younger brother, Michitaka. Despite appearing beautiful and sweet, Michitaka hides a sinister side to him and is wanted by the police.

== Characters ==
Kei Miyama (御山 慧, Miyama Kei)
Voiced by: Tomohiro Ōno

== Media ==
=== Manga ===
Written and illustrated by Aki Irie, Go with the Clouds, North-by-Northwest began serialization in Enterbrain's Harta magazine on March 14, 2016. In April 2021, Kadokawa launched a new magazine, titled Aokishi. When it launched, the series was transferred into the magazine. In February 2025, it was announced the series would no longer be serialized in the magazine. In October 2025, the series would continue with the new publisher Yukiwarisō. The first tankōbon volume was released on October 13, 2017. As of February 2024, seven volumes have been released.

At Anime Central 2018, Vertical announced they licensed the series for English publication.

==== Volumes ====
No.	Original release date	Original ISBN	English release date	English ISBN
1	October 13, 2017	978-4-04-734831-8	April 16, 2019	978-1-94-719455-7
2	March 15, 2018	978-4-04-735052-6	August 20, 2019	978-1-94-719468-7
3	January 15, 2019	978-4-04-735345-9	December 17, 2019	978-1-94-998007-3
4	January 14, 2020	978-4-04-735792-1	November 17, 2020	978-1-94-998037-0
5	January 15, 2021	978-4-04-736263-5	August 17, 2021	978-1-94-998071-4
6	November 18, 2022	978-4-04-737232-0	September 26, 2023	978-1-64-729102-0
7	February 20, 2024	978-4-04-737867-4	April 15, 2025	978-1-64-729449-6

=== Anime ===
An anime television series adaptation was announced on April 29, 2026. It will be produced by Qzil.la and directed by Yōsuke Kubo, with Takashi Sano serving as chief director and handling the series composition, and Chikashi Kubota designing the characters. The series is set to premiere on TBS in 2027. Netflix will stream the series worldwide.

== Reception ==
Danica Davidson of Otaku USA praised the series, calling it "very interesting". Katherine Dacey of Manga Critic also praised the first volume for its plot and characters. Koiwai of Manga News concurred with Dacey, praising the plot and characters. Faustine Lillaz of Planete BD concurred with previous critics, calling the plot and artwork "breathtaking".

In the 2019 issue of Kono Manga ga Sugoi!, the series ranked eleventh on the list of top manga for male readers. The series was also nominated for the Manga Taishō in the same year. In December 2020, the series ranked 50th in the top manga rankings by Kadokawa's Da Vinci magazine. The next year, in December 2021, the series ranked 48th in the same Da Vinci magazine ranking.
