= Wolfsmund =

Japanese manga series

- Cover of the first (Vertical edition)

狼の口 〜ヴォルフスムント〜 (Ōkami no Kuchi: Vorufusumundo)
- Genre: Historical, fantasy
- Manga
- Written by: Mitsuhisa Kuji
- Published by: Enterbrain
- English publisher: Vertical
- Magazine: Fellows!; Harta
- Original run: 2009 – 2016
- Volumes: 8
- icon

Wolfsmund (Japanese: 狼の口 〜ヴォルフスムント〜, Hepburn: Ōkami no Kuchi: Vorufusumunto) is a Japanese manga series written and illustrated by Mitsuhisa Kuji. It was serialized in Enterbrain's seinen manga magazine Fellows!, then later known as Harta, from 2009 to 2016. Its chapters were compiled in eight volumes, with its eighth volume concluding the manga's run. It was published in English by Vertical, and in French by Ki-oon.

== Plot ==
The story of Wolfsmund is a retelling of the rebellion started by the legendary William Tell. The story revolves around the oppression that took place in the Middle Ages in the middle cantons (states) of Switzerland. During this time, three cantons (the Schwyz, Uri, and Unterwalden) formed an "Eternal Alliance" that promised a military alliance for defense between the three cantons. The main source of fear for the cantons came from the feudal lords of Austria, the Habsburg.

The three cantons had their own independent states surrounding the St. Gotthard Pass, an important mountain pass that created an efficient traveling shortcut between Germany and Italy. Each of the cantons ruled and managed their own section of the Gotthard Pass, and gathered much revenue from charging merchants and travelers en route. Starting mid-13th century, the rich and powerful feudal Habsburgs began fighting central Swiss cantons to gain sole control over the profitable Gotthard Pass and the lands around it. Thus a rebellion began between the much poorer cantons against the highly powerful Habsburgs.

Wolfsmund takes place in the early 1300s, with the oppression by Austria well under way, led by Duke Leopold I. It is explained that he has already captured all three cantons, and now works to destroy any resistance, with the resistors and protesters facing harsh consequences, most often death or torture. The Duke's partner in crime is Bailiff Wolfram, a cruel and merciless man who oversees the barrier station Wolfsmund, a passing station that checks for travel permits. Those attempting to sneak through without a permit are subject to harsh punishments sentenced by Wolfram, who always wears a cruel smile on his face.

Wolfram's cruelty to his victims, where he tortures anyone suspected being part of the Eternal Alliance or for the fun of it, makes him feared and hated among the people of the cantons, where many assassins try to kill Wolfram for his crimes only to fail thanks to Wolfram's trickery, the Wolfsmund's many traps and his many soldiers. William Tell becomes the face of the Alliance against the Habsburgs, so Wolfram in response kills his wife and one of his sons and forces William to sacrifice his life to save his other son, Walther. Walther vows revenge for all of his friends and family killed by the Habsburgs and becomes the new face of the Eternal Alliance.

Ironically, Wolfram's attempts to subdue the rebellion using his cruel methods ends up making more people join the Eternal Alliance to the point that they have enough men to lay siege on Wolfsmund. With the help of gunpowder from China to blow up the Wolfsmund's impregnable gates and the sacrifice of many rebel lives, Walther and the rebels manage to take over Wolfsmund and capture Wolfram before he can escape. Wolfram tries to bargain for his freedom with the rebels with the promise of riches from his master. However, well aware of Wolfram being a liar and never honoring his promises since he did the same thing to his victims before torturing them, the leaders of the Eternal Alliance sentenced him to death for his crimes by wooden impalement via the anus which Wolfram can only weakly cry of unfairness before his execution.

While the cantons celebrate the fall of Wolfram and proceed to take control of more castles from Habsburg control, Duke Leopold I gathers a large army to crush the rebellion and gain full control of Gotthard Pass, unaware of Wolfram's demise. Leopold's army chases after a group of rebels at the Reuss River which he believes are the last remnants of the rebellion only to realize too late that the group was bait where the rebels proceed to use the higher ground to drop wooden logs onto his army to trap them, leading to the Battle of Morgarten where many knights are killed as they are caught off guard and the rebels avenging for the Habsburg's cruelty against their people. Leopold escapes but not before a dying Walther tells the Duke that the cantons will never fall under the Habsburgs. With the majority of his forces decimated and rival families taking advantage of the situation, Duke Leopold is forced to give up his plans to conquer Gotthard Pass to consolidate his power.

Due to their victory against the Habsburg, the other cantons join the Eternal Alliance and formed a new country, the future nation of Switzerland.

== Publication ==
- Volume 1 (February 15, 2010; English: July 2, 2013)
- Volume 2 (October 15, 2010; English: October 29, 2013)
- Volume 3 (November 15, 2011; English: January 14, 2014)
- Volume 4 (September 15, 2012; English: April 15, 2014)
- Volume 5 (October 15, 2013; English: August 12, 2014)
- Volume 6 (October 14, 2014; English: March 31, 2015)
- Volume 7 (November 14, 2015; English: March 22, 2016)
- Volume 8 (November 15, 2016; English: July 25, 2017)

== Reception ==
On Anime News Network, Rebecca Silverman gave the first volume an overall grade of B, calling it "brutal", saying that it "pulls few punches and hits you in the gut" and recommending it to "fans of historical fiction that pays attention to the history or those looking for some well done seinen". Also on Anime News Network, Silverman gave the sixth volume an overall grade of A−, calling it "harsh and difficult...and still nearly impossible to put down."
