= Haven't You Heard? I'm Sakamoto =

Japanese manga series by Nami Sano

- Cover of the first volume of the manga featuring Sakamoto.

坂本ですが? (Sakamoto desu ga?)
- Genre: Comedy
- Manga
- Written by: Nami Sano
- Published by: Enterbrain
- English publisher: NA: Seven Seas Entertainment
- Magazine: Harta
- Original run: April 14, 2012 – December 14, 2015
- Volumes: 4
- Anime television series
- Directed by: Shinji Takamatsu
- Produced by: Nobumitsu Urasaki; Gou Tanaka; Gorou Shinjuku; Atsushi Aitani; Kazufumi Kikushima; Makoto Satou; Kisara Takahashi; Ryousuke Watanabe
- Written by: Shinji Takamatsu
- Music by: Yasuhiko Fukuda
- Studio: Studio Deen
- Licensed by: AUS: Hanabee; NA: Sentai Filmworks (expired); UK: Manga Entertainment
- Original network: JNN (TBS, CBC, MBS, BS-TBS, TBS Channel 1)
- English network: NA: Anime Network SEA Animax Asia
- Original run: April 8, 2016 – July 1, 2016
- Episodes: 12 + OVA
- icon

Haven't You Heard? I'm Sakamoto (Japanese: 坂本ですが?, Hepburn: Sakamoto desu ga?; lit. 'I'm Sakamoto, You Know?') is a Japanese manga series written and illustrated by Nami Sano. The manga follows a high school student named Sakamoto, who has a reputation for being the "coolest" person among the entire student body. The series has been licensed for an English release by Seven Seas Entertainment. An anime television adaptation produced by Studio Deen aired between April 8 to July 5, 2016.

== Plot ==
The story is centered around the incredibly popular Sakamoto: a flawless boy genius who is well liked by fellow students and most of the faculty in the high school for his coolness. Despite the strange situations he often finds himself in, typically consisting of pranks set up by the envious male population of the school, Sakamoto always manages to emerge in absolute perfection and as a result makes himself seem even cooler.

== Characters ==
Sakamoto (坂本)
Voiced by: Hikaru Midorikawa (Japanese); Houston Hayes (English)
The protagonist of the series who is a model student for all the other students in his school. He is the perfect man who can solve any problem with a kind, yet unflappable persona. Because of this, many girls fall for him, and some of his male classmates resent him (just a few only). Although he acts strangely sometimes (such as doing weird poses or acting sneakily), it only adds to his coolness. Sakamoto has a range of 'secret skills' which allow him to do various things, such as catch bugs or blow bubbles.
He is often oblivious to the dangers around him and, according to Yoshinobu, he accepts most things as being normal. He is often oblivious to people's feelings as well, though once he realized the other party's feelings, he will do something to make them happy, or ease their worries.
His first name is never told; once, Aina tries to find his name, but each time she locates it around the classroom, it is obscured behind something. When she asks him about his first name, despite the fact that he said it, no one can hear it due to noise, making her suspect that he is banned from saying it on-air.
Following the graduation of the third year students, Sakamoto announced to his classmates that he will be moving to America to pursue his dream as an astronaut. At the same time, he was met with multiple cream pie attacks by his fellow classmates and teacher as a sign of heartwarming departure.
Yoshinobu Kubota (久保田 吉伸, Kubota Yoshinobu)
Voiced by: Akira Ishida (Japanese); Greg Ayres (English)
A student who was being bullied for money until Sakamoto helped him get a part-time job at McDoodle's (a parody of McDonald's that is known as WcDonalds in the anime). Kubota managed to stand up for himself in dealing with the bullies, and now hangs out with Sakamoto. Like Sakamoto, he has 'secret skills', though they are all related to fast food. He cares for his hair so much, that when Hayabusa's underclassmen shaves all of his hair until he goes bald, he cries and stays in his room, not wanting to see anyone. He is also seen bringing hair care equipment to school. Likewise with other students, Kubota joins them in a cream pie attack against Sakamoto before he moved to America.
Atsushi Maeda (前田 あつし, Maeda Atsushi)
Voiced by: Tomokazu Sugita (Japanese); Andrew Love (English)
Nicknamed "Acchan". Sakamoto's former bully, and one of a three-member delinquent group. After being bested by Sakamoto, Acchan no longer smokes, instead choosing to blow bubbles. He harbors both resentment and admiration to Sakamoto and during the third year students' graduation ceremony, he was manipulated into attacking Sakamoto while he delivered a speech. Eventually, he gives up and voiced his jealousy towards Sakamoto and the latter covers up his attack as a part of his speech, saving him from disciplinary punishment. After Sakamoto announced his departure to America, Atsushi announced his dream to study harder and surpass Sakamoto while trying to throw a cream pie at the former before he evades it.
Mario (まりお, Mario)
Voiced by: Ken Takeuchi (Japanese); Gabriel Regojo (English)
The one with a high short ponytail in the three-member delinquent group together with Atsushi/Acchan.
Ken Ken (ケンケン, Kenken)
Voiced by: Nobuyuki Hiyama (Japanese); Adam Noble (English)
The golden-haired one in the three-member delinquent group together with Atsushi/Acchan.
Yūya Sera (瀬良 裕也, Sera Yūya)
Voiced by: Showtaro Morikubo (Japanese); Chris Patton (English)
A male student who is in the same class as Sakamoto. He disliked him for always stealing the class' attention. Sera was a teenage model until an incident involving Sakamoto and a wasp, and now is a class clown who makes bee jokes. After Sakamoto announced his departure to America, Sera announced his dream to become Japan's top comedian while trying to throw a cream pie at the former before he evades.
Aina Kuronuma (黒沼 あいな, Kuronuma Aina)
Voiced by: Yui Horie (Japanese); Luci Christian (English)
A female student in Sakamoto's class who falls for him. She is very popular among boys but has no interest for anyone else except Sakamoto, which makes her disliked by other girls. She charms the boys to do her bidding by making them fall in love with her through 'love lessons', which turned out to be totally invalid to Sakamoto. After Sakamoto announced his departure to America, Aina announced her dream to become Japan's top model and win Sakamoto's affection while trying to throw a cream pie at the former before he evades.
Megumi Fujita (藤田 恵, Fujita Megumi)
Voiced by: Mai Nakahara (Japanese); Genevieve Simmons (English)
A female student and the class representative in Sakamoto's class. She is fond of taking photographs of Sakamoto. Her friends call her Fu-chan.
Kana-chan (カナちゃん, Kana-chan)
Voiced by: Yukari Tamura (Japanese); Chaney Moore (English)
A female student who belongs to Megumi's circle of friends. Her brown hair is styled into a twintail.
Mī-chan (みーちゃん, Mī-chan)
Voiced by: Kana Ueda (Japanese); Shanae'a Moore (English)
A female student who belongs to Megumi's circle of friends. She wears red-framed spectacles.
Yagi (八木, Yagi)
Voiced by: Hitomi Nabatame (Japanese); Katelyn Barr (English)
A female student who belongs to Aina's circle of friends. She has dark-blue hair.
Tanaka (田中, Tanaka)
Voiced by: Saki Fujita (Japanese); Juliet Simmons (English)
A female student who belongs to Aina's circle of friends. She has blonde hair.
Erika (エリカ, Erika)
Voiced by: Mikako Takahashi
A female student with short light brown hair. She appears to be a bit tomboyish. Her mother is named Keiko.
Morita (森田, Morita)
Voiced by: Tomoaki Maeno (Japanese); Kregg Dailey (English)
Yasuda (安田, Yasuda)
Voiced by: Tatsuhisa Suzuki (Japanese); Gareth West (English)
Shigeru Kobayashi (小林 茂, Kobayashi Shigeru)
Voiced by: Masahito Yabe
Kakuta (角田, Kakuta)
Voiced by: Jouji Nakata (Japanese); Jovan Jackson (English)
A dark-skinned man who is Class 1-2's Physical and Health Education teacher. He resents Sakamoto for his act of coming to school exactly on time before the bell rings, and by sliding in between his legs. His hair has a straight cut so perfect that it can be used as a substitute for a ruler.
Shigemi Kubota (久保田 茂美, Kubota Shigemi)
Voiced by: Kujira (Japanese); Joanne Bonasso (English)
Yoshinobu's mother, who falls for Sakamoto when she meets him, as he resembles Chon Choriso.
Chon Choriso (チョン·チョリソー, Chon Choriso)
Voiced by: Jun Fukuyama
A Korean idol, of whom Shigemi is a fan. Sakamoto's appearance is close to Chon, which partially explains why she falls for the former.
Maruyama (丸山, Maruyama)
Voiced by: Tetsu Inada
A delinquent in grade 2 who once used Sakamoto as his errand boy, but Sakamoto's seemingly considerate "service" finally overwhelms him.
Shou Hayabusa/8823 (8823, Hayabusa)
Voiced by: Koji Yusa (Japanese); Ty Mahany (English)
A delinquent in year 2 who is regarded as a model by other delinquents. He is handsome and smart, and, unlike most delinquents, he respects honor. He manages to drag Sakamoto into a duel with him, but is finally moved by Sakamoto. He is currently aligned to Sakamoto after long-time delinquent Fukase damaged his noseline during the cultural festival. It reveals that he is the eldest brother who showed concern on his siblings and his estranged father. Hayabusa was the last person that Sakamoto met before he left for America and the former suspected his reason of departure as a lie despite Sakamoto denied it as such.
Fukase (深瀬, Fukase)
Voiced by: Mitsuo Iwata (Japanese); Justin Doran (English)
A long-time delinquent who is in 30s, has an IQ of 180 and had a strange past. He is popular among delinquents due to his tendency of targeting popular students while manipulating others to do his dirty work. He harbors interest to Sakamoto and decides to play a "game" with him in throwing him out in school during the cultural festival which he is unsuccessful. During the graduation ceremony for the third graders, Fukase manipulates Acchan into attacking Sakamoto but once this fails, he was bested by Sakamoto and the whole school's delinquents into his own graduation. Finally moved on by Sakamoto, he was never to be shown at the school ever since and is currently working as a surfer at a nearby beach.

== Media ==
The series debuted in 2011, before beginning regular serialization in Enterbrain's Fellows! magazine (renamed as Harta magazine in February 2013) on April 14, 2012. The series ended its serialization on December 14, 2015. The series was collected into four tankōbon volumes.

The series is licensed in North America by Seven Seas Entertainment, who released the first volume in August 2015.

=== Volumes ===
No.	Original release date	Original ISBN	English release date	English ISBN
1	January 15, 2013	978-4-04-728633-7	August 4, 2015	978-1-626921-96-2
2	November 15, 2013	978-4-04-729273-4	November 17, 2015	978-1-626922-20-4
3	December 15, 2014	978-4-04-730087-3	March 8, 2016	978-1-626922-51-8
4	January 15, 2016	978-4-04-730925-8	July 26, 2016	978-1-626922-88-4

=== Anime ===
It was announced in the final volume of the manga that the series would get an anime television series adaptation. It aired between April 8 and July 1, 2016, (Note: The series premiered on April 7, 2016 at 26:28 on TBS, which is equivalent to 2:28am on April 8, 2016.) on TBS and later on CBC, MBS, BS-TBS and TBS Channel 1. The anime was animated by Studio Deen and written and directed by Shinji Takamatsu, with music composed by Yasuhiko Fukuda, character designs by Atsuko Nakajima and art direction by Masatoshi Muto. The opening theme was "COOLEST" by CustomiZ and ending theme was "Nakushita Hibi ni Sayonara" (無くした日々にさよなら; Goodbye to Lost Days) by Suneohair.

The series was simulcast by Crunchyroll. Following a one-week delay due to coverage of the 2016 earthquake in Kumamoto, the thirteenth episode was not aired as part of the television broadcast. The episode was later streamed by Crunchyroll on September 27, 2016, and will be included with the series' fifth Blu-ray/DVD volume on October 26, 2016. Sentai Filmworks licensed the series for release in North America. After the acquisition of Crunchyroll by Sony Pictures Television, Haven't You Heard? I'm Sakamoto, among several Sentai Filmworks titles, was dropped from the Crunchyroll streaming service on March 31, 2022, before Sentai lost the license to the series a year later.

==== Episode list ====
No.	Title	Original release date
1	"Sakamoto of Class 1-2"; Transliteration: "Ichi-Nen Ni-kumi Sakamoto-kun" (Japanese: 1年2組 坂本君)	April 8, 2016
1	"Bee Quiet"; Transliteration: "Bī Kuwaietto" (Japanese: ビー・クワイエット)	April 8, 2016
Envious of Sakamoto's popularity, three delinquents, Atsushi, Mario and Kenken tried multiple attempts to bully Sakamoto but failed miserably. In their recent attempt, they accidentally put on a fire on the school laboratory until Sakamoto's quick-thinking skills called Kakuta, a nearby teacher to put out the flame. With Sakamoto taking the blame for them, the three delinquents started a liking towards him. Sera tries to gain more popularity by defaming Sakamoto, which failed. During class session, a hornet invaded the classroom. Sera used this as an opportunity by attacking the hornet but as he nearly endangered, Sakamoto engaged in a sword fight using a compass against the bee's stinger and managed to neutralize the situation without harming it. Having endured the humiliation earlier, Sera decided to become a comedian instead.
2	"I Want to Protect, Rather Than Be Protected"; Transliteration: "Mamorareru yori mamoritai" (Japanese: 守られるより守りたい)	April 22, 2016
2	"Starting Today, I Can Use the Love Psychology Technique"; Transliteration: "Kyō kara tsukaeru ren'ai shinri-jutsu" (Japanese: 今日から使える恋愛心理術)	April 22, 2016
With Kubota always lacking money due to being constantly bullied, Sakamoto helped him by getting themselves work at a fast food restaurant. Initially unable to cope with his workplace, Kubota later takes a liking to it. During his payday, the two bullies that targeted Kubota appeared again but Sakamoto's advice allowed him to stand up against them until Sakamoto arrived and the two fight back against the bullies. Before leaving, Sakamoto complimented Kubota's secret technique and advised him to sharpen it. The second arc focuses entirely on Aina's attempts to flirt Sakamoto, which ended up in failure, partly due to Yagi and Tanaka. While the three girls played a kokkuri, and they accidentally made Sakamoto possessed by a spirit who then orders the girls to build an arch for him in any form. Yagi and Tanaka uses the student's desk and chairs before Aina finally gives in and helps out of guilt. As their operation succeeded, both Yagi and Tanaka started to gain respect and befriended Aina before heading home. In the end, it was revealed that everything was orchestrated by Sakamoto himself, having pretended to be possessed all the time.
3	"The Gopher, Sakamoto"; Transliteration: "Pashirisuto Sakamoto" (Japanese: パシリスト坂本)	April 29, 2016
3	"Hide and Seek of Love"; Transliteration: "Koi no kakurenbo" (Japanese: 恋のかくれんぼ)	April 29, 2016
Maruyama and the upperclassmen delinquents bullied the first years into becoming their servants. One of the servants is Sakamoto, whom Maruyama tries to put him to use, seeing how efficient he is until Sakamoto overwhelms him. With Kubota's grades falling, Sakamoto helps him study for the next exam. Kubota's mother takes a liking to Sakamoto after his first arrival to their house, and so with Sakamoto coming over to study again, Kubota plans to hide Sakamoto in his house. While Kubota leaves to pick up a textbook, Sakamoto tries to evade Kubota's mother in the house with initial success. Spotting a camera and a disk, Sakamoto uses the chance to trick Kubota's mother into thinking that he had fled into the television. Following that incident, Kubota and Sakamoto decide to study at the library.
4	"Is Sakamoto A Pervert?"; Transliteration: "Sakamoto wa sukebe desu ka?" (Japanese: 坂本はすけべですか？)	May 6, 2016
4	"Classroom Scene Omnibus"; Transliteration: "Jugyō fūkei omunibasu" (Japanese: 授業風景オムニバス)	May 6, 2016
4	"The Summer of Sakamoto's Disappearance"; Transliteration: "Sakamoto ga kieta natsu" (Japanese: 坂本が消えた夏)	May 6, 2016
Kakuta, the class' physical education teacher, tries multiple times to catch Sakamoto breaking school rules, but fails miserably. He finally gets his chance when he catches Sakamoto eating in health class, but it is revealed that it was all just a plot to feed an injured bird. In cooking class, Kana-chan encounters a slug inside a cabbage, which Sakamoto skillfully gets rid of. In art class, which involves drawing each of the students' partners, Aina pairs herself with Sakamoto. As it seemed that Sakamoto sketches her as an orangutan, it is revealed that she viewed the art in the wrong way and its true form is quite beautiful. After a fire breaks out in the school, Sakamoto rescues Acchan, who was left behind in the school toilet after everyone evacuated. After Acchan and his fellow delinquents accidentally have Sakamoto fall down a hole they dig as a prank, they go on a search for him after his disappearance extends to a week. When they only find his button inside the hole, they assume that Sakamoto had used Acchan's trap to get to the other side of the world, though later it is revealed that this is not the case, as the hole is actually shallow. Sakamoto had entered the trap on his own, in believing that they were digging for a hot spring and that he could help.
5	"Softball Throwing"; Transliteration: "Sofutobōru nage" (Japanese: ソフトボール投げ)	May 13, 2016
5	"Charisma Yankee Senior 8823"; Transliteration: "Karisuma yankī Hayabusa-senpai" (Japanese: カリスマヤンキー8823先輩)	May 13, 2016
5	"Health Care"; Transliteration: "Kenkō kanri" (Japanese: 健康管理)	May 13, 2016
When it is Sakamoto's turn to throw the softball, Kubota accidentally gets hit, causing a nosebleed. Sakamoto stops the bleeding by ripping off part of his shirt and wrapping it around Kubota's head. Seeing Maruyama's traumatized behavior when they talk about Sakamoto, Hayabusa goes to see Sakamoto. Due to a misunderstanding, Hayabusa thought that Sakamoto orders Class 1-2 girls to assault him when they meet, and is under the impression that Sakamoto has taken control of Class 1-2 students. Hayabusa asks Sakamoto to meet him at the riverbed after school, but Sakamoto declines, as he has cleaning duty. In order to make him go, Hayabusa's underclassmen try to make him angry by stealing his indoor shoes and ruler (which he named Smith), and leaving notes to give the impression that Hayabusa is the one who did it. Finally, upon seeing a bald Kubota Yoshinobu crying, an angry Sakamoto goes to see Hayabusa. As they are about to fight, a police officer sees them, and Sakamoto gives an excuse that they are just playing 手押し相撲 (Teoshi Sumo, literally hand-pushing sumo). Despite claiming they are just playing, Sakamoto has all the intention to beat Hayabusa in pushing sumo, which results in both of them fight a rather serious match. After knowing the truth, Hayabusa and his underclassmen go to Kubota's house to apologize and gives him seaweed to make his hair grow faster, and a happy Kubota throws a seaweed party. Sakamoto has a fever, and instead of resting in the infirmary, he wears a tie made out of Welsh onion.
6	"Go Home Rules"; Transliteration: "Gekō no rūru" (Japanese: 下校のルール)	May 20, 2016
6	"Love Acrossing Camera"; Transliteration: "Kamera-goshi no koi" (Japanese: カメラ越しの恋)	May 20, 2016
6	"Cafeteria Marketing"; Transliteration: "Shokudō Māketingu" (Japanese: 食堂マーケティング)	May 20, 2016
Several elementary school students follow Sakamoto on their way home. Megumi, Sakamoto's stalker and Class 1-2's representative discovered a ghost infatuated to him and tries to warn him. In the end, she graduates from being a stalker to a photographer who takes Sakamoto's pictures. In the epilogue, Sakamoto helped the lunch lady to promote her neapolitan via subliminal messages.
7	"Is Sakamoto Really A Pervert?"; Transliteration: "Yahari Sakamoto wa sukebe desu ka?" (Japanese: やはり坂本はすけべですか？)	May 27, 2016
7	"Sera's French Revolution"; Transliteration: "Sera no furansu kakumei" (Japanese: 瀬良のフランス革命)	May 27, 2016
In a video rental shop, Acchan and friends trick Sakamoto to help them renting adult videos. After manages to avoid being detected by Aina and friends (and Shigemi), Sakamoto face the shop manager at the counter in a bluff act, who suspects that Sakamoto is still underage. When everything is over, Acchan invites Sakamoto to watch the rented videos together, but Sakamoto escapes immediately. Realizing that it is still too early for them, Acchan returns the adult videos without watching them. During Sports Day, Sera tries to overtake Sakamoto's popularity (or at least, make his popularity lower) by sabotaging the events with the cooperation of the rest of Class 1-2 boys. Despite all odds, the plan backfires on them, as Sakamoto wins the events with style, and his popularity increases as a result. In the relay race, Sera ties both of Sakamoto's shoes so that he can't run. Far from giving up, Sakamoto bites the baton with his mouth and runs like a four-legged cheetah. When he passes the baton, the baton slips from Yagi's hand due to the baton covered in saliva, which makes them fall down to last place. Seeing Yagi cries while running, Sera decides to erase Yagi's mistake from everyone's memory by doing a more memorable event... by running naked after the baton is passed to him, to everyone's gross and dismay, though Yagi thanked him later on.
8	"The Cultural Festival is Gloomy"; Transliteration: "Bunkasai wa gurūmī" (Japanese: 文化祭はグルーミー)	June 3, 2016
Maruyama, Hayabusa and upperclassmen delinquents try to participate in their school's Cultural Festival by making cotton candy cooked from improvised equipment. Acchan suggests to Hayabusa that Sakamoto should be invited to their booth and Hayabusa seemingly agrees until Fukase, a long time delinquent with a strange past, interrupts and forces Hayabusa to spill out about Sakamoto. Hayabusa didn't say anything about Sakamoto and Fukase uses the cotton candy machine to hurt Hayabusa. Meanwhile at room 1-2, the class is struggling to make their own booth by using balloons and Sakamoto improvises everything to make their balloon presentations look attractive and convincing. However, two slackers who are seemingly no help to other classmates left the room and sulk about Sakamoto's participation. Fukase approaches them, and suggest that the slackers should do something to damage Sakamoto's reputation. The next day, the balloons were destroyed and wanted posters scattered around the campus, accusing Sakamoto for the mishap. Now a wanted man, Sakamoto evades delinquents who are trying to get him because of the reward and Fukase quietly watches. Sakamoto decides to clear his name, he went to his room and saw the slackers reorganizing their presentation. His classmates convince Sakamoto to admit the mishap but he left. Later, a mysterious girl name A-ko (A子, literally Girl A) knocks on their room and admits she popped the balloons. One of the slackers utters that the girl is lying, but Mi-chan points out that they shouldn't know that as they left early yesterday. When the slackers opens the door, it reveals that Sakamoto is using helium gas and turning the tables against the slackers. The slackers attempts to pop the balloons but Sakamoto cleverly intimidates the slackers by popping the balloons using sunlight reflecting on Kubota's mirror. The confrontation ended when the slackers give up and Sakamoto lectures them. With no time left and lack of materials, Sakamoto uses the remaining balloons with invitations attached to them and Hayabusa's cotton candy to craft Yeti costumes, as they organize a Yeti Hunting Game. As Sakamoto donning a Yeti costume, runs through the hallway with the slackers, Fukase catches his eyes and Sakamoto returns the latter's gaze.
9	"The Meeting Between Sakamoto and Me"; Transliteration: "Sakamoto-kun to watashi no deai" (Japanese: 坂本君と私の出会い)	June 10, 2016
9	"Nearest, Yet Far Person"; Transliteration: "Ichiban chikakute tōi hito" (Japanese: 一番近くて遠い人)	June 10, 2016
Megumi Fujita, along with Kana-chan and Mi-chan, ate their lunch outside and started recollecting on how they first met Sakamoto. Megumi met him at the entrance exam, where he warmed her trembling hands by heating up her fallen eraser with frictional force. Mi-chan met him on the day of entrance ceremony, where the storm broke her favourite umbrella. Firstly sadden, she then cheered up when Sakamoto treated his broken umbrella like a wine glass and acted like a rain sommelier. Lastly, Kana-chan met him during the day before the entrance ceremony. Since she had forgotten her bag, she held all her textbooks in her hands, and as such, was unable to see forward. When she fell down, Sakamoto caught and princess-carried the books. While the girls are smitten over Sakamoto's initiatives, Kubota on the other hand reminisce his first acquaintance to Sakamoto where his bandage on his ring finger fell and Sakamoto returns the bandage seeming like inserting a ring. Sakamoto chides Kubota's story but the girls, upon hearing Kubota's story, felt envious as his first meeting with sakamoto was the most romantic. When her son Yoshinobu comes down with a cold, Shigemi Kubota gets another chance to romantically pursue her underage love interest to Sakamoto. Taking advantage of her resemblance to her son, Shigemi dons his uniform and goes to school in his place. Although she has plenty of opportunities to make a move on Sakamoto throughout the school day, Shigemi's efforts are thwarted at every turn. During their athletics class, Shigemi chases Sakamoto but falls down, destroying her shell necklace. Sakamoto picks up the pieces and returns it to Shigemi, realizing that she cannot fulfill her desires to be with Sakamoto and recollecting being a mother to Yoshinobu, she resolves to prioritize being a good mother. The next day, Yoshinobu recovers and Shigemi prepares a meal to him.
10	"Demon Lord"; Transliteration: "Maō" (Japanese: 魔王)	June 17, 2016
10	"Lacking Thing"; Transliteration: "Tarinai mono" (Japanese: 足りないもの)	June 17, 2016
During Christmas Eve, Sakamoto is invited by two college guys to a group date karaoke in order to complete their number, but seeing how Sakamoto attracted the female audiences, they try to sabotage his karaoke moment until he covered it via his operatic singing of a famous poem Der Erlkönig. Hayabusa seeks Sakamoto's help when his father invites him to a fancy dinner with a woman, who he claimed is Hayabusa's stepmother candidate. As Hayabusa has no knowledge about table manners and Sakamoto points out that it can't be learnt in a single day, Hayabusa rents a LL-size coat, in which Sakamoto hides in and use his hands instead of Hayabusa's at the restaurant. Later, when they found that Hayabusa's father is cornered by some thugs, Sakamoto and Hayabusa change places to fight them. The woman turns out to be an extortionist, and Sakamoto skillfully fends them off by using the opportunity to tell a horror story about a person eating French cuisine who grows another pair of arms out of allergy. Hayabusa concludes that rather than pretend that they have something they lack, they should make up for what the other person lacks.
11	"No Need for Warmth"; Transliteration: "Nukumori wa iranai" (Japanese: ぬくもりはいらない)	June 24, 2016
11	"1-2 Memories"; Transliteration: "1-2 memorīzu" (Japanese: 1-2メモリーズ)	June 24, 2016
As Yoshinobu walks with Sakamoto to school, he realizes that he knows almost nothing about Sakamoto, though he assure himself that he will have a lot of time to talk about it later. Hearing that it is the first time Sakamoto has seen snow, Acchan teaches Sakamoto how to play in the snow. Frustrated that Sakamoto has surpassed him in everything he taught rather easily, Fukase approaches Acchan, suggesting he fights Sakamoto in a one-on-one battle. He then decides to fight Sakamoto in a snowball fight, determining to crush him. Watching Acchan trembling in coldness, Sakamoto throws a hand warmer to him. He felt bad because despite his intentions, Sakamoto earnestly just wanted to play, and even thought about his well-being. As he walks home, Fukase approaches him again. Class 1-2 reminisce about their memories throughout the year by looking at the pictures taken by Megumi, especially Sakamoto's pictures. Notable events including the day Sakamoto made umbrella arrangements, Marathon Race day, and the day they went to beach. Hayabusa and the other delinquents have a meeting, and he tells them that Fukase is not going to graduate (again) that year. Mario and Kenken points out that Acchan is acting weird lately, and a lone Acchan, holding one of the pictures, gets approached again by Fukase, who persuades him to burn the picture, alongside all his attachment to Sakamoto. In the epilogue, during the graduation ceremony, Acchan walks towards Sakamoto still giving the farewell speech on the stage, telling him to disappear, with a metal bat in his right hand.
12	"So Long, Sakamoto-kun"; Transliteration: "Sayonara Sakamoto-kun" (Japanese: さよなら坂本君)	July 1, 2016
Picking up from the previous episode, Fukase converses with Atsushi who persuades him to eliminate Sakamoto by burning the picture and his admiration to him. At the graduation ceremony, Sakamoto initiates the graduation speech by presenting a volleyball he retrieved from above. As he speaks to the crowd, Acchan approaches Sakamoto with a metal baseball bat. Acchan randomly swings his bat against those who try to interfere in his assault on Sakamoto and Fukase stops the teachers. With the crowd shocked and thinking it is a part of his presentation, Sakamoto extends his speech as he evades Acchan's attacks until they reach the rafters. Acchan swings his bat again but slips down and Sakamoto quickly grabs his hand. However, Acchan swings his bat to Sakamoto's hand and berates him about looking down on his personality. A wounded Sakamoto improvises his speech and tells everyone including Acchan about believing in friends. Acchan slips his hand and Sakamoto still catches him, proving that Sakamoto has a deep care for his friends. The crowd is delighted and gives Sakamoto a standing ovation. Acchan surrenders while Hayabusa's group arrive. Sakamoto heads to the clinic to tend to his wounds and talks with Fukase for the first time. Fukase compares life after highschool to a deep ocean while Sakamoto, filled with hope, says that he will swim through that deep ocean to find new opportunities. Hayabusa, determined to put an end to Fukase, waits outside while Sakamoto approaches him and suggests a non-violent way to eliminate Fukase. As the graduates march with Fukase looking on, Hayabusa and his group enters and "congratulates" Fukase. With the help of Sakamoto, Fukase is thrown out during the graduation ceremony. Kubota narrates the aftermath of the ceremony, Acchan was unpunished believing that he was part of Sakamoto's presentation, Fukase was seen on a beach holding a surfboard and a rumor about Sakamoto leaving was found to be true. Sakamoto was selected by a space administration in America and he will pursue his studies to become an astronaut. The 1-2 class bids farewell to Sakamoto by means of pie throwing which Sakamoto easily dodges as he leaves the classroom and holds a single pie in his hand. Hayabusa also bids goodbye to Sakamoto. At the school gate with Kakuta guarding, Sakamoto approaches with smothered pie on his face. He is asked who he is as his face is covered by pie and he simply says, he is Sakamoto.
13	"Haven't You Heard? I'm Sakamoto: The Movie"; Transliteration: "Sakamoto desu ga? The Movie" (Japanese: 坂本ですが? The Movie)	September 27, 2016
Following Sakamoto's departure, the students come up with different ideas for making a Haven't You Heard? I'm Sakamoto movie. Later, upon finding photographic evidence of Sakamoto being in America, the students try to imagine what he is up to, ranging from training to be an astronaut to being a student at a martian high school. Meanwhile in America, Sakamoto was enlisted as a shuttle pilot and was able to overcome a leakage in the fuel tank, therefore successfully bringing the shuttle back on course.

== Reception ==
It won the 2013 Comic Natalie Grand Prize. Volume 1 was also number one on the Book of the Year list of Male-Oriented Comics from January to June, 2013 by Da Vinci magazine.

As of November 24, 2013, volume 1 has sold 930,716 copies and volume 2, 397,213. Volume 1 was the 19th best-selling manga volume in the period of November 19, 2012, to May 19, 2013 and the 27th from November 19, 2012, to November 17, 2013. Volume 2 reached the number one place on the Oricon weekly manga chart in the week of November 11 to 17, 2013. Volume 3 has sold 626,823 copies as of January 18, 2015.
