= A Bride's Story =

Japanese manga series by Kaoru Mori

- First tankōbon volume cover, featuring Amir Halgal

乙嫁語り (Otoyomegatari)
- Genre: Historical; Romance; Slice of life
- Manga
- Written by: Kaoru Mori
- Published by: Enterbrain (2008–2025); Yukiwarisō (2026–present)
- English publisher: NA: Yen Press
- Magazine: Harta, formerly Fellows!; (2008–2020); Aokishi; (2021–2025)
- Original run: 14 October 2008 – present
- Volumes: 15
- icon

A Bride's Story (Japanese: 乙嫁語り, Hepburn: Otoyomegatari) is a Japanese manga series written and illustrated by Kaoru Mori. It was first serialized in Enterbrain's Harta (formerly known as Fellows!) magazine from October 2008 to November 2020, after which it transferred to Kadokawa's Aokishi magazine in June 2021. Its serial chapters have been collected into 15 tankōbon volumes as of November 2024. Yen Press licensed the series for an English-language release in North America. As of December 2025, all 15 volumes have been published in English.

A Bride's Story won the Prix Intergénérations ("Intergenerational Award") at the Angoulême International Comics Festival in 2012, as well as the 7th Manga Taishō Award in 2014.

== Synopsis ==
Set in a rural town near the Caspian Sea during the Russian conquest of Central Asia in the late 19th century, A Bride's Story revolves around a young woman, Amir, who travels from a distant village across the mountains to marry Karluk, a young man eight years her junior. The series follows their relationship as it develops, while introducing storylines about other young women and their daily lives with their respective fiancés and husbands along the Silk Road, and their struggle to keep on their livinghood amidst the advance of the Russian Empire's army.

== Characters ==
=== Eihon family ===
The Eihon family descended from nomads, but have lived in a village for several generations. The family is largely patrilocal, but Yusuf, a son-in-law, married into the family.

Amir Halgal (アミル・ハルガル, Amiru Harugaru)
A twenty-year-old woman and Karluk's bride. She stems from a different (semi-nomadic) tribe. She is skilled in archery, horse-riding, and hunting. Despite the noticeable age gap between her and Karluk, she genuinely loves him. She is considered old for a new bride, and long past the traditional age when women in the society have started having children.
Karluk Eihon (カルルク・エイホン, Karuruku Eihon)
Amir's twelve-year-old husband. He is the youngest son of Akunbek and Sanira. He works very hard to be a good traditional husband to Amir, but because of his young age, he struggles to form a closer relationship with her. Karluk is considered an oddity in that he is younger than his bride; traditionally the bride is usually many years younger than the groom.
Mahatbek (マハトベク, Mahatobeku)
Karluk's grandfather.
Balkirsh (バルキルシュ, Barukirushu)
Karluk's grandmother. She hails from the same clan as Amir.
Akunbek (アクンベク, Akunbeku)
Karluk's father. A village elder.
Sanira (サニラ, Sanira)
Karluk's mother.
Seleke (セイレケ, Seireke)
Yusuf's wife and Karluk's elder sister.
Yusuf (ユスフ, Yusufu)
Karluk's brother-in-law. Seleke's husband. He lives with his wife's family.
Tileke (ティレケ, Tireke)
Daughter of Seleke and Yusuf.
Torkcan (トルカン, Torukan), Chalg (チャルグ, Charugu), and Rostem (ロステム, Rosutemu)
Sons of Seleke and Yusuf.
Henry Smith (ヘンリー・スミス, Henrii Sumisu)
An English traveler and researcher. He has been researching the customs, language, and culture of the tribes and peoples.

=== Residents of the town ===
Pariya (パリヤ, Pariya)
A young woman who is introduced in chapter 6; attracted to Amir's free-spirited nature, the two become good friends. Her father is Togo, a potter. She is betrothed to Umar.
Pariya also appears in a short-comic spin-off of the series called "Pariya-san wa Otoshigoro".
Chagap (チャガップ, Chagappu)
An old man who raises sheep.
Kamola (カモーラ, Kamōra)
A young woman in the village. Through Amira's encouragement, Pariya and Kamola become friends.

=== Halgal family ===
Amir's family. They are nomadic during the summer. Introduced in chapter 4.

Azel (アゼル, Azeru)
Amir's eldest brother. He becomes the leader of the Halgal clan after his father's death in the battle against Amir's village.
Joruk (ジョルク, Joruku)
A maternal cousin of Amir and Azel.
Baimat (バイマト, Baimato)
A paternal cousin of Amir and Azel. Unlike Joruk, Baimat is reserved, stoic, and dependable.
Berkhrat (ベルクラット, Berukuratto)
Amir and Azel's father, former chief of the Halgal clan. He is succeeded by Azel as clan chief.

=== Jandiq clan ===
A nomadic clan of the steppe, who agree to join an alliance of steppe clans and town dwellers against the Russian encroachment. They are introduced in chapter 96.

Jahan (ジャハン, Jahan)
The chief of the Jandiq (ジャンディク, Jandiku) clan, who agrees bind his clan to the Halgal family through marriage as part of the nomadic clans' alliance. Before agreeing to any engagement, Jahan challenges the Halgal men prove their worthiness by winning a horse race against their prospective brides.
Jahan Bique (ジャハン・ビケ, Jahan Bike)
The daughter of Jahan. Bique is chosen by Azel as his bride because of her strength and valour.
Ryazat (リャザット, Ryazatto)
A young woman of the Jandiq clan who takes a fancy to Joruk.
Aigul (アイグル, Aiguru)
A young woman from the Jandiq clan, she attracts Baimat's attention.

=== Other characters ===
Numaji (ヌマジ, Numaji)
A clan notorious for their wealth and brutality.
Talas (タラス, Tarasu)
A young nomadic woman living with her mother-in-law. Introduced in chapter 12. Married at age sixteen, but in a few years became a widow of all its five sons as per tradition, which dictates that a widow with no children marries one of her husband's brothers. She becomes romantically involved with Mr. Smith, and eventually follows him to Ankara.
Talas's mother-in-law (タラスの義母, Tarasu no gibo)
An old nomadic woman. She wishes for Talas to have a future with a loving husband. Later marries Talas's uncle in order to secure a good match for her.
Talas's uncle (タラスの叔父, Tarasu no oji)
The brother of Talas's father-in-law. A wealthy, aggressive man that wants Talas to be a second wife for his son. He reports Smith to the town's authorities which leads to Smith's arrest and later marries Talas's mother-in-law.
Ali (アリ, Ari)
Smith's guide to Ankara.
Laila and Leyli (ライラとレイリ, Raira to Reiri)
Identical twin sisters from a thriving fishing village. Their father later marries the two sisters to the first and second sons of one of his friends.
Laila and Leyli's family (ライラとレイリの家, Raira to Reiri no ie)
Laila and Leyli's father is a fisherman who is strict with his children. He allows Mr. Smith to remain at his house believing he is a doctor. The twins' mother is Minah (ミナー, Minā). The girls' family also includes several younger siblings, their maternal aunt, their grandfather, and their grandmother.
Sarmaan and Farsami (サマーンとファルサーミ, Samān to Farusāmi)
Sarmaan and Farsami are the eldest and second sons, respectively, of a fisherman. Both are fishermen themselves. Sarm marries Laila, and Sami marries Leyli.
Anis (アニス, Anisu)
The young wife of a wealthy and kindhearted man living in Persia. She is the mother of a young son, Hasan. Smith and Ali are briefly guests in the home of Anis' husband, though Smith never sees Anis herself. Anis is isolated and lonely until her maid Maarfe encourages her to join her at the public baths. Anis forms an immediate connection with Sherine, with whom she hopes to form a bond of sisterhood with.
Sherine (シーリーン, Shīrīn)
A mother to a young son. Shortly after she and Anis commit themselves as sisters, Sherine's husband dies because of an illness. Anis persuades her husband to take Sherine on as a second wife and her family joins the household.
Umar (ウマル, Umaru)
Pariya's suitor, a young man close to her age whose father raises sheep and runs a traveler's inn. A thoughtful and observant youth, he is skillful at a number of tasks, including calculating figures on an abacus. Umar and his father consider Pariya's liveliness to be a positive trait.
Mr. Hawking (ホーキング博士, Hōkingu hakase)
An old friend of Henry Smith. He is employed by the British government in India. Smith was sent to Central Asia by his order to provide access about the possible Russian threat to India during the Great Game. He provides Smith a camera to record life in Central Asia when Smith visits Hawking's personal residence in Ankara.
Nikolovsky (ニコロフスキー, Nikolovski)
A Ukrainian cossack recruited by Mr. Hawking to accompany Henry Smith, Ali, and Talas back through Central Asia. Nikolovsky is a veteran of the Crimean War of the Imperial Russian Army.

== Publication ==
Written and illustrated by Kaoru Mori, A Bride's Story was first serialized in Enterbrain's seinen manga magazine Harta (formerly known as Fellows!) from 14 October 2008 to 13 November 2020. It transferred to Kadokawa's manga magazine Aokishi on 18 June 2021. The series' chapters have been collected into fifteen tankōbon volumes by Kadokawa as of 20 November 2024. The first nine volumes were published under Enterbrain's Beam Comix imprint; subsequent volumes have been published under Kadokawa's Harta Comix imprint. In addition to the tankōbon release, a wide-ban collector's edition of the manga has been issued by Kadokawa since 20 August 2021. The wide-ban features large pages, high-quality paper, fold-out color illustrations, and special boxes to store each volume in. A Bride's Story is also available in digital e-book format in Japan.

Yen Press licensed the series for an English-language release in North America. The first volume was published on 31 May 2011; the fifteenth and most recent volume was published on 16 December 2025. The series received a digital release starting on 25 September 2018.

A Bride's Story is also licensed for regional language releases by Ki-oon in France, Tokyopop Germany in Germany, J-Pop Manga in Italy, Norma Editorial in Spain, Studio JG in Poland, Punainen jättiläinen in Finland, Level Comics in Indonesia, Daewon C.I. in Korea, Kadokawa Taiwan in Taiwan, Siam Inter Comics in Thailand, and IPM in Vietnam.

== Reception ==
A Bride's Story won the Manga Taishō Award in 2014. It was previously nominated for the award in 2011 and 2013. The series also won the Prix Intergénérations ("Intergenerational Award") at France's Angoulême International Comics Festival in 2012. It was nominated for an Eisner Award in 2012 and 2016. The American Library Association's YALSA division included the first volume on its list of Great Graphic Novels For Teens in 2012.
