= Ki-oon =

French publishing company

- Status: Active
- Founded: 2003
- Founder: Cécile Pournin; Ahmed Agne
- Country of origin: France
- Headquarters location: Paris, France
- Key people: Cécile Pournin; Ahmed Agne
- Publication types: manga
- Fiction genres: heroic fantasy
- Official website: www.ki-oon.com

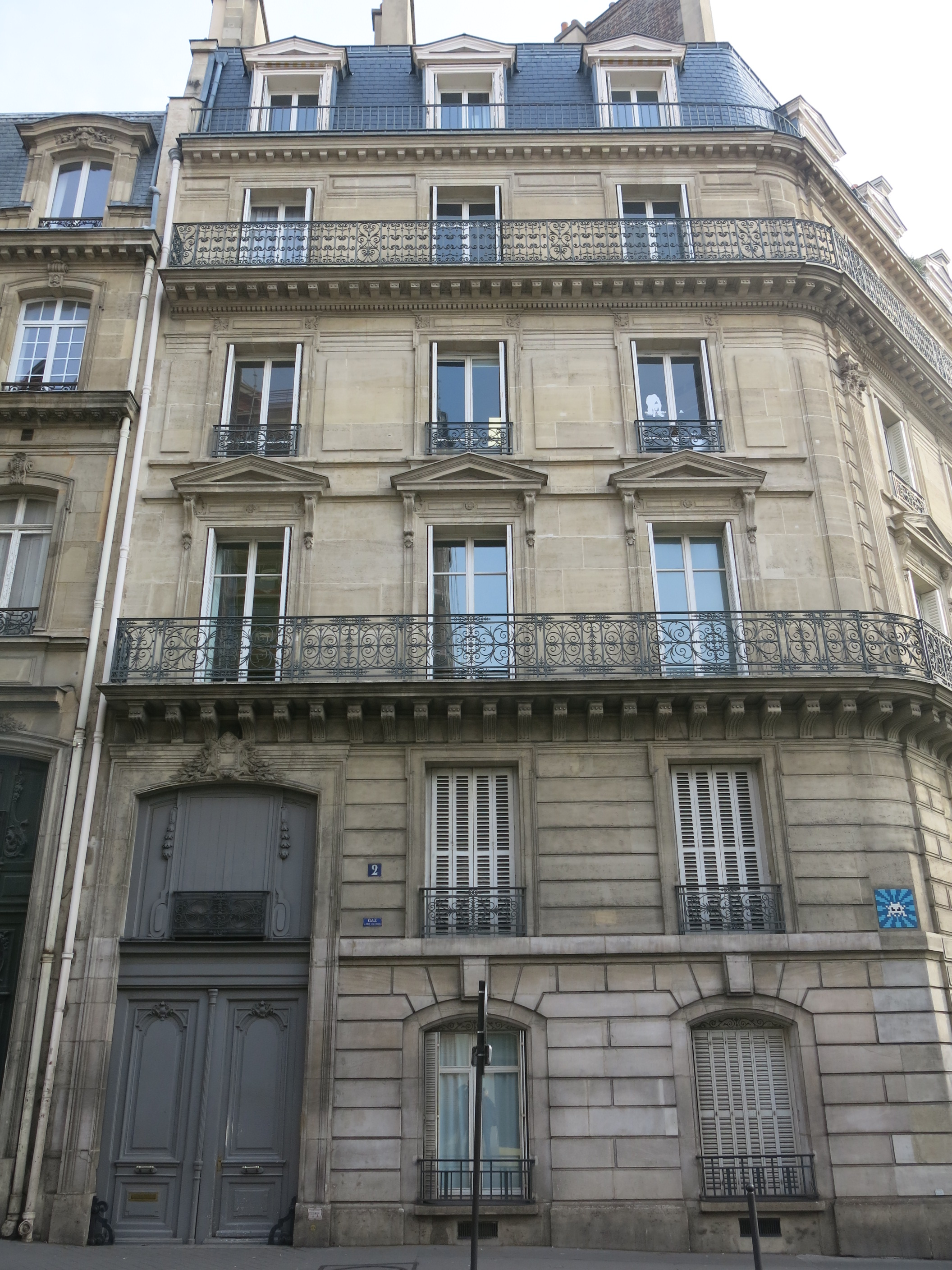
Head office of Ki-oon

Ki-oon is a French manga publisher with its head office in the 8th arrondissement of Paris.

It was founded in October 2003 by Cécile Pournin and Ahmed Agne. It released its first manga in March 2004, the first volume of Element Line. The name "Ki-oon" comes from an onomatopoeia meaning "having the heart inflated with emotion". With an increase in revenue of 80% in 2009, Ki-oon is in 2010 the most important independent publisher of manga in France.

== Published manga ==
=== Finished series ===
- Alice au royaume de cœur (6 volumes)
- Batipst (6 volumes)
- Bamboo Blade (14 volumes)
- Blood of Matools (6 volumes)
- Boogiepop Dual (2 volumes)
- Chichi Kogusa (8 volumes)
- Duds Hunt (one-shot)
- Doubt!! (4 volumes)
- Element Line (7 volumes)
- Guardian Dog (4 volumes)
- Jackals (7 volumes)
- Kamichu! (2 volumes)
- Kamisama (3 volumes)
- Kashimashi ~girl meets girl~ (5 volumes)
- Kazan (7 volumes)
- L'Île de Hôzuki (4 volumes)
- La Mosca (7 volumes)
- Lineage Saga (3 volumes)
- Lodoss - La Légende du chevalier héroïque (6 volumes)
- Mahoromatic (8 volumes)
- Manhole (3 volumes)
- Marie & Elie (5 volumes)
- Nui! (3 volumes)
- Reset (one-shot)
- Role Playing Girl (one-shot)
- Shin Megami Tensei If... (one-shot)
- Shin Megami Tensei: Kahn (9 volumes)
- Slayers - Knight of Aqua Lord (6 volumes)
- Stigma (one-shot)
- Stray Little Devil (5 volumes)
- Tales of Destiny (6 volumes) - based on the video game Tales of Destiny
- Tales of Symphonia (6 volumes) - based on the video game Tales of Symphonia
- Tsukihime (10 volumes)
- Vampire Chronicles (9 volumes)
- Yuma à la conquête du monde (2 volumes)

=== Being released ===
- A Bride's Story
- Afterschool Charisma (2 volumes)
- Amanchu! (3 volumes)
- Artelier Collection (12 volumes)
- Asagiri: Les prêtresses de l'aube (4 volumes)
- Bamboo Blade (12 volumes)
- Bitter Virgin (4 volumes)
- Blood Alone (6 volumes)
- Boku Dake ga Inai Machi (as Erased) (3 volumes)
- Breath of Fire IV (4 volumes)
- Candidate for Goddess (5 volumes)
- Hell Blade (3 volumes)
- Immortal Hounds (4 volumes)
- Judge (3 volumes)
- Jusqu'à ce que la mort nous sépare (15 volumes)
- Kurokami (15 volumes)
- No Man's Land (2 volumes)
- Pandora Hearts (10 volumes)
- Superior (9 volumes)
- Tales of the Abyss (6 volumes)
- Tsugumi Project (4 volumes)
- Twelve (5 volumes)
- Witch Buster (25 volumes)
- Wolfsmund (6 volumes)
- Übel Blatt (11 tomes sortis (de 0 à 10))
- Tripeace (9 volumes)
