= Harta (magazine) =

Japanese seinen manga magazine

- First issue of the revamped Harta magazine, featuring an original illustration by Foo Midori
- Categories: Seinen manga
- Frequency: Ten issues per year
- Publisher: Enterbrain
- First issue: October 14, 2008 (as Fellows!); February 13, 2013 (as Harta)
- Country: Japan
- Language: Japanese
- Website: https://www.harta.jp

Harta (Japanese: ハルタ, Hepburn: Haruta), formerly known as Fellows!, is a Japanese seinen manga magazine published by Enterbrain. Launched on October 14, 2008, the magazine was originally called Fellows! and was published with a frequency of publication of two months. In December 2012, Enterbrain announced a revamp on the magazine beginning with its February issue in 2013 with the publication changing its name of Fellows! to Harta and also changing its frequency from bimonthly to ten issues per year from February to August and then October to December. The name is inspired by the Indonesian word "Harta", which means "treasure."

Unlike many of the manga magazines in Japan in which the cover features a series currently serialized on the magazine, every issue's cover has an original illustration by different artists.

A spin-off web magazine titled Harta Alternative began publication in April 2023. The web magazine's launch commemorates the 10th anniversary of Harta.

== Serialized titles ==
- A Bride's Story (transferred to Aokishi)
- A Sinner of the Deep Sea
- Aoi Horus no Hitomi: Dansō no Joō no Monogatari
- The Coppersmith's Bride (ongoing)
- Delicious in Dungeon
- Desperate March for Love
- Furo Run
- Gisèle Alain
- Go with the Clouds, North-by-Northwest (transferred to Aokishi)
- Hakumei and Mikochi (ongoing)
- Hakuginhi
- Haven't You Heard? I'm Sakamoto
- Hinamatsuri
- The Hitman Stans (ongoing)
- Hotel Metsäpeura e Yōkoso (ongoing)
- Ikinokotta 6-nin ni yoru to (ongoing)
- Immortal Hounds
- Isabella Bird in Wonderland
- Majo no Eden
- Migi & Dali
- Ran and the Gray World
- Reki Yomi
- Ruri Rocks (ongoing)
- Shinobuna! Chiyo-chan
- Subaru to Suu-san
- Shirley
- Teito Kage Monogatari
- Uwagaki
- Vlad Drăculea (ongoing)
- Wanko ni Kuchizuke
- Wolfsmund
