= Kazumi Yamashita =

Kazumi Yamashita may refer to:

- Kazumi Onishi (born 1948), née Yamashita, Japanese figure skater
- Kazumi Yamashita (artist) (born 1959), Japanese manga artist
