= Danmitsu =

Japanese manga series

- First tankōbon volume cover, featuring Tōru Seino (left) and Mitsu Dan (right)

「壇蜜」
- Genre: Non-fiction; Slice of life
- Manga
- Written by: Tōru Seino
- Published by: Kodansha
- Imprint: Morning KC
- Magazine: Morning
- Original run: December 26, 2024 – present
- Volumes: 3
- icon

Danmitsu (Japanese: 「壇蜜」) is a Japanese manga series written and illustrated by Tōru Seino. It began serialization in Kodansha's seinen manga magazine Morning in December 2024.

== Synopsis ==
The series is an autobiography of the author's marriage with actress Mitsu Dan.

== Publication ==
Written and illustrated by Tōru Seino, Danmitsu began serialization in Kodansha's seinen manga magazine Morning on December 26, 2024. Its chapters have been compiled into three tankōbon volumes as of July 2026.

No.	Release date	ISBN
1	July 23, 2025	978-4-06-540035-7
2	January 22, 2026	978-4-06-542182-6
3	July 22, 2026	978-4-06-544281-4

== Reception ==
The series was ranked second in the 4th Crea Late Night Manga Awards in 2025 hosted by Bungeishunjū's Crea magazine. The series was ranked fourteenth in Da Vinci's 2025 Book of the Year ranking. The series was ranked second in the 2026 edition of Takarajimasha's Kono Manga ga Sugoi! guidebook's list of best manga for male readers. The series was ranked eighth in Freestyle Magazine's "The Best Manga 2026" ranking in 2025. The series was nominated for the 19th Manga Taishō in 2026, and ranked second. The series was ranked third in the 2026 EbookJapan Manga Award.
