= This World Is Worth Fighting For =

Japanese manga series

- First tankōbon volume cover, featuring Ito Kiri

この世は戦う価値がある (Konoyo wa Tatakau Kachi ga Aru)
- Genre: Drama
- Manga
- Written by: Hatsumi Kodama
- Published by: Shogakukan
- English publisher: NA: Seven Seas Entertainment
- Imprint: Big Spirits Comics
- Magazine: Weekly Big Comic Spirits
- Original run: April 17, 2023 – October 31, 2025
- Volumes: 5
- Television drama
- Directed by: Kaede Kamiya (Kyodo Television)
- Produced by: Kohei Suzuki (Fuji TV); Jun Kurosawa (Telepack)
- Written by: Yasuko Kuramitsu
- Studio: Kyodo Television
- Original network: FNS (Fuji TV)
- Original run: January 2027 – scheduled
- icon

This World Is Worth Fighting For (Japanese: この世は戦う価値がある, Hepburn: Konoyo wa Tatakau Kachi ga Aru) is a Japanese manga series written and illustrated by Hatsumi Kodama. It was serialized in Shogakukan's seinen manga magazine Weekly Big Comic Spirits from April 2023 to October 2025, with its chapters collected in five tankōbon volumes. A television drama adaptation is set to premiere in January 2027.

== Synopsis ==
Due to her desire to be a useful person, Kiri Ito undergoes sexual harassment at the hands of her bosses at work, and abuse from her boyfriend. One day, she receives a letter without a name or return address that tells her she has the right to live freely, and she does so accordingly.

== Media ==
=== Manga ===
Written and illustrated by Hatsumi Kodama, This World Is Worth Fighting For was serialized in Shogakukan's seinen manga magazine Weekly Big Comic Spirits from April 17, 2023, to October 31, 2025. Its chapters were compiled into five tankōbon volumes released from October 12, 2023 to January 30, 2026.

The manga has been licensed for English release in North America by Seven Seas Entertainment, with the first volume set to release in July 2027.

==== Volumes ====
No.	Original release date	Original ISBN	English release date	English ISBN
1	October 12, 2023	978-4-09-862535-2	July 13, 2027	979-8-90568-242-1
2	March 12, 2024	978-4-09-862754-7	—	—
3	September 11, 2024	978-4-09-863029-5	—	—
4	May 12, 2025	978-4-09-863417-0	—	—
5	January 30, 2026	978-4-09-863760-7	—	—

=== Drama ===
In November 2026, it was announced that the manga would receive a television drama adaptation, set to premiere on Fuji Television and its affiliates as part of its Mokuyō Gekijō timeslot in January 2027. The series is produced by Kyodo Television, written by Yasuko Kuramitsu, and directed by Kaede Kamiya. It will star Hiyori Sakurada as Ito Kiri.

=== Other ===
The series had a collaboration with the band Mono no Aware in a music video for their song "Wasureru" on September 9, 2024.

== Reception ==
The series was ranked eighth in the 2025 edition of Takarajimasha's Kono Manga ga Sugoi! guidebook's list of the best manga for male readers. The series was nominated for the 18th Manga Taishō.

== See also ==
- Zange Meshi, another manga series by Hatsumi Kodama
