= Talk to My Back =

Japanese manga series

Talk to My Back (Japanese: しんきらり, Hepburn: Shin Kirari; 'A Glimmering Flash of Light' or 'Flash of Light') is a Japanese manga series written and illustrated by Murasaki Yamada, (Note: The English edition writes the author's name in Japanese order, Yamada Murasaki.) serialized in Garo in the 1980s and published in Japanese by Seirindō. The English version is published by Drawn and Quarterly, with Ryan Holmberg as the translator.

== Plot ==
The story is about a housewife, Yamakawa Chiharu (山川 ちはる), (Note: Yamakawa is the surname, reflecting the official English translation of the manga.) who experiences domestic relationship problems. Holmberg stated that Chiharu's "relationship to herself" in regards to self-actualization are the "true heart" of the comic. She lives in a danchi similar to one that Yamada lived in. Yamada lived in the Takashimadaira Danchi in Itabashi, Tokyo, and Talk to My Back uses that danchi as its setting.

Chiharu's spouse engages in extramarital affairs and perceives Chiharu primarily as, in Holmberg's words, "caretaker of his children and domestic servant"; according to Holmberg, he is "not the worst man ... in fact kind and responsible by period standards".

== Creation and conception ==
The original Japanese title is a coinage created by poet Yūko Kawano.

Yamada had shortly beforehand started the process of separating from her then-husband as Talk to My Back was about to serialize. The image used as the cover for book releases had Seiichi Hayashi do the Japanese calligraphy and Shinbō Minami do the design work. Noriko Tetsuka fixed design issues and supervised the production process.

== Release ==
The February and March 1981 episode of Garo was the first issue which serialized Talk to My Back. Serialization stopped in September 1982, then began again in December of that month. The final chapter was published in October 1984.

The first Japanese book collection, published by Seirindō, was in two volumes, with the first volume release in August 1982. According to Tetsuka, that first volume sold over 10,000 copies. There were three subsequent single-volume releases in Japan. Shogakukan re-released the series under the Shogakukan Creative label.

== Reception ==
Talk to My Back was perceived, in press articles, as a shufu (主婦) comic. The word means a female head of household, and Holmberg argued that was a better translation than "housewife". Yamada did not like herself being portrayed as a shufu artist.

The New York Times referred to it as an "early feminist manga". Rachel Cooke of The Guardian wrote that "At moments, it's almost as if Murasaki has set out to fictionalise Betty Friedan's The Feminine Mystique." Helen Chazan of The Comics Journal stated that loneliness is a key theme in the work.

Publishers Weekly stated that the drawings are "so overly spare", citing the "loosely sketched gestural action" and how not all facial features are always drawn.

Cooke stated that the work "stands the test of time in the most remarkable way".

== See also ==
- Feminism in Japan
- Women in Japan
- Second Hand Love, a collection of two 1980s manga by Yamada
- Housewives of Japan, 2012 book about Japanese housewives
