= Hechikan =

Japanese tea connoisseur and poet

Hechikan (丿貫), originally with the surname Sakamoto-ya (坂本屋) and sometimes called "Nyomugwan", was a 16th-century Japanese tea connoisseur and poet from Kyoto.

== Biography ==
His birth and death dates are unknown. The birthplace is also unknown, with Mino Province and Kyoto being proposed. He lived for a time at a retreat he set up in Yamashina in Kyoto. It is said he learned the tea ceremony from tea master Takeno Jōō. He married the niece of physician Manase Dōsan. He shunned pomp and splendour in the tea ceremony, preferring the austere beauty of the wabi-suki aesthetic.

Different sources also pronounce his name as "Pechikwan", "Pechikan", and "Hechikan". In Japanese, his name can be written 丿観, 丿貫, 丿垣, and 別貫. The kanji "丿" is often mistaken for the katakana character "ノ" ("no"). His choice of this character for his name may have been intended to indicate his eccentricity (curving to one side, it has been taken to mean that his heart did not follow a straight path) or because it is one half of the character for "man" 人, indicating that he felt himself to be half a man.

Hechikan was known for his eccentricities. Hechikan was present at Toyotomi Hideyoshi's famous outdoor tea ceremony at the Kitano shrine in 1587, and received an award from Hideyoshi for his wabi-suki aesthetic. There he indulged in various eccentricities, including the erection of an oversized umbrella hung with reed fencing (for which Hideyoshi rewarded him with a tax remittance) and the impersonation of a priest. Hechikan is also noted for a practical joke he played on the tea-master Sen no Rikyū; having invited Rikyū to a tea ceremony, he booby-trapped the path to the chashitsu (tea room) with a pitfall (落とし穴). Though he claimed later to have recognised the ruse, Rikyū fell into the pit, allowing Hechikan to rescue him and provide him with a bath and clean clothing.

Hechikan was critical of Rikyū because he felt that the latter had not experienced the hardships of poverty; he himself was not particularly wealthy, and survived by begging. On one occasion, Hechikan sold his tea utensils to raise funds, only to have the money stolen from his house. During his time at Yamashina, he used a single pot to cook his meals, draw water and brew tea. He composed the following poem about it:

"Oh, you kettle,
Your mouth is protruding
A little too much.
Don't tell the others
I cooked porridge in you."

In later life he moved to Satsuma. Although it appears that he wrote poetry, he apparently collected and burned all his poems shortly before his death.

Hyouge Mono (Japanese: へうげもの Hepburn: Hyōge Mono, lit. "Jocular Fellow") is a Japanese manga written and illustrated by Yoshihiro Yamada. It was adapted into an anime series in 2011, where Hechikan is portrayed.

== See also ==
- Sorori Shinzaemon
