= Shimazaki in the Land of Peace =

Japanese manga series

- First tankōbon volume cover, featuring Shingo Shimazaki

平和の国の島崎へ (Heiwa no Kuni no Shimazaki e)
- Genre: Action comedy; Political thriller; Slice of life
- Manga
- Written by: Gouten Hamada
- Illustrated by: Takeshi Seshimo
- Published by: Kodansha
- English publisher: NA: Kodansha USA
- Imprint: Morning KC
- Magazine: Morning
- Original run: August 4, 2022 – present
- Volumes: 14
- icon

Shimazaki in the Land of Peace (Japanese: 平和の国の島崎へ, Hepburn: Heiwa no Kuni no Shimazaki e) is a Japanese manga series written by Gouten Hamada and illustrated by Takeshi Seshimo. It has been serialized in Kodansha's seinen manga magazine Morning since August 2022.

== Synopsis ==
For thirty years, Shingo Shimazaki worked with the terrorist organization Revolutionary Army of the League for Economic Liberations. He was forced to join after surviving a terrorist attack at the age of nine and was subsequently trained and sent to various war zones. Now he has escaped, returned to Japan, and wants to finally lead a normal life. He tries to integrate into this new everyday life, but some seemingly ordinary tasks are difficult for him, and his Japanese is noticeably unusual. He tries to cope with all of this using the skills he acquired through military and espionage training. Some people help him, while others try to thwart his integration.

== Publication ==
Written by Gouten Hamada and illustrated by Takeshi Seshimo, Shimazaki in the Land of Peace started in Kodansha's seinen manga magazine Morning on August 4, 2022. Kodansha has collected its chapters into individual tankōbon volumes. The first volume was released on December 22, 2022. As of November 20, 2026, fourteen volumes have been released.

In March 2024, Kodansha USA announced that they had licensed the manga for print release, with the first volume set to be published in November of the same year.

=== Volumes ===
No.	Original release date	Original ISBN	English release date	English ISBN
1	December 22, 2022	978-4-06-530080-0	November 26, 2024	978-1-64729-395-6
2	March 23, 2023	978-4-06-531121-9	January 21, 2025	978-1-64729-411-3
3	August 4, 2023	978-4-06-532412-7	March 25, 2025	978-1-64729-446-5
4	November 22, 2023	978-4-06-533668-7	May 27, 2025	978-1-64729-447-2
5	March 22, 2024	978-4-06-534948-9	July 29, 2025	978-1-64729-448-9
6	July 23, 2024	978-4-06-536001-9	October 14, 2025	978-1-64729-480-9
7	November 21, 2024	978-4-06-537454-2	January 27, 2026	978-1-64729-496-0
8	February 21, 2025	978-4-06-538281-3	April 7, 2026	978-1-64729-582-0
9	May 22, 2025	978-4-06-539537-0	July 7, 2026	978-1-64729-597-4
10	September 22, 2025	978-4-06-540617-5	October 13, 2026	978-1-64729-614-8
11	January 22, 2026	978-4-06-541980-9	April 6, 2027	978-1-64729-663-6
12	April 23, 2026	978-4-06-543159-7	—	—
13	July 22, 2026	978-4-06-543947-0	—	—
14	November 20, 2026	978-4-06-545308-7	—	—

== Reception ==
Manga author Hitoshi Iwaaki recommended the series with a comment featured on the obi of the first volume. The series ranked eighteenth in the Next Manga Award's print category in 2023. It ranked fifth on Takarajimasha's Kono Manga ga Sugoi! list of best manga of 2024 for male readers. It was nominated for the 17th Manga Taishō in 2024, and placed fourth with 59 points. It was ranked fifth in the Nationwide Publishers' Recommended Comics of 2024 list. It was nominated for the eBookJapan Manga Award 2024. It won the eighth Saito Takao Award. The series, alongside Shosen Hitogoto Desu kara: Toaru Bengoshi no Honne no Shigoto, was ranked 30th on the 2024 "Book of the Year" list by Da Vinci magazine.

== See also ==
- Khan: Kusa to Tetsu to Hitsuji, another manga series by Takeshi Seshimo
