= Zange Meshi =

Japanese manga series

- First tankōbon volume cover

ざんげ飯
- Genre: Gourmet; Romantic comedy
- Manga
- Written by: Hatsumi Kodama
- Published by: Kodansha
- Imprint: Morning KC
- Magazine: Morning (2020–2021); Comic Days (2020–2022)
- Original run: May 14, 2020 – December 21, 2022
- Volumes: 7
- icon

Zange Meshi (Japanese: ざんげ飯; lit. 'Repentance Food') is a Japanese manga series written and illustrated by Hatsumi Kodama. It was first irregularly published in Kodansha's seinen manga magazine Morning from May 2020 to July 2021, and was published on the online platform Comic Days from August 2020 to December 2022; its chapters were collected in seven tankōbon volumes.

== Publication ==
Written and illustrated by Hatsumi Kodama, Zange Meshi started its irregular serialization in Kodansha's seinen manga magazine Morning on May 7, 2020; the series started publication on the Comic Days online platform on August 5 of the same year, and the series continued its irregular publication in Morning until July 21, 2021. The manga finished on December 21, 2022. Kodansha its chapters in seven tankōbon volumes, released from December 9, 2020, to February 8, 2023.

=== Volumes ===
No.	Japanese release date	Japanese ISBN
1	December 9, 2020	978-4-06-521169-4
2	March 10, 2021	978-4-06-522573-8
3	July 14, 2021	978-4-06-524087-8
4	December 23, 2021	978-4-06-526130-9
5	April 13, 2022	978-4-06-527413-2
6	September 14, 2022	978-4-06-529239-6
7	February 8, 2023	978-4-06-530776-2

== See also ==
- This World Is Worth Fighting For, another manga series by Hatsumi Kodama
