= Housewives of Japan =

2012 book by Ofra Goldstein-Gidoni

Housewives of Japan: An Ethnography of Real Lives and Consumerized Domesticity is a 2012 book by Ofra Goldstein-Gidoni, published by Palgrave Macmillan.

The book covers the 2000s. The research subject is a group of women, who primarily work to care for their households, in one residential complex in Osaka. The book explores the concept behind the term "professional housewife" (専業主婦 sengyō shufu).

== Background ==
A friend of the author, Mariko Ishikawa, had e-mailed her on whether a housewife would be better off being regarded as a "professional" in that field or not. This prompted the development of the book. Ishikawa became the co-designer of the academic study. Communication was done by e-mail, and fifty women were interviewed.

== Contents ==
There are three portions in the book. Part I has chapters 1-2. Part II has chapters 3-5 has the information about the ethnography. Part III has chapters 6-7 and explains the evolution on what housewives do in Japanese society.

The first chapter explains how the author conducted research. The second chapter discusses the "housewife debate" (主婦論争 shufu ronsō) and "housewifeization" (主婦か shufu-ka).

The third chapter has testimonies from the various housewives on what they do in their households, while the fourth chapter has their testimonies about their relationships with their spouses, who are salarymen. The fifth chapter discusses how the women conduct their lives.

The sixth chapter discusses media portrayals and the seventh chapter describes how the author feels that society is becoming paleoconservative. There is an afterword after chapter 7 which is an epilogue for the people who gave testimonies.

== Reception ==
Allison Alexy of the University of Virginia, described it as a "fascinating" work, and she had a positive reception on how the book covered divergent, conflicting opinions held by the housewives.

Konrad Kalicki of the University of British Columbia wrote that the work "is worth reading", citing the " rich empirical content" as the main factor; Kalicki argued that there are some flaws in the research methodology.

Susanne Klien of Hokkaido University described the book as "compelling".

== See also ==
- Women in Japan
- Talk to My Back, manga about a housewife
