= Ichi-F =

Japanese manga series

いちえふ (Ichi-efu)
- Genre: Autobiography; Historical
- Manga
- Written by: Kazuto Tatsuta
- Published by: Kodansha
- English publisher: NA: Kodansha USA; TW: Sharp Point Press
- Magazine: Morning
- Original run: October 31, 2013 – October 8, 2015
- Volumes: 3

Ichi-F: A Worker's Graphic Memoir of the Fukushima Nuclear Power Plant (Japanese: いちえふ 福島第一原子力発電所労働記, Hepburn: Ichi-efu Fukushima Daiichi Genshiryoku Hatsudensho Rōdōki) is a graphic memoir by Kazuto Tatsuta about his time as a worker on the ongoing cleanup following the 2011 Fukushima Daiichi nuclear disaster. The manga, which Tatsuta wrote under a pseudonym for fear of being barred from the plant site, was originally published as a one-shot, winning Kodansha's MANGA OPEN contest. It was later extended into a full series, which was serialized in Morning from 2013 to 2015.

The title is derived from the cleanup workers' nickname for the Fukushima Daiichi Nuclear Power Plant, "ichiefu" or "1-F."

Three collected volumes were published in Japan in 2014 and 2015. Kodansha Comics published an English-language edition as a single volume on March 7, 2017, close to the sixth anniversary of the 2011 Tōhoku earthquake and tsunami that precipitated the disaster.

The series was widely read and discussed in Japan as one of the only pieces of reliable reporting from inside the cleanup site, which was previously only accessible to the media through tours tightly controlled by plant operator TEPCO.

== Overview ==
Referring to his work in the Japanese subtitle as a "record of labor", Tatsuta describes the daily lives of workers at the site down to small details, such as how itchy their noses would become after hours under protective masks. (That chapter, titled "Itchy Nose", was republished in the March 2017 issue of Harper's Magazine.) Other notable details include a description of the multi-layered subcontracting system employed by TEPCO to hire cleanup workers. The unnamed company that Tatsuta worked for is a sixth subcontractor of TEPCO, and after all the intermediaries took their cuts, his salary was only 8,000 yen per day, rising to 20,000 yen on days when he was called upon to enter the reactor buildings.

Neither the manga nor Tatsuta have posed an answer to whether Japanese nuclear power plants should be closed. When Kyodo News asked why Tatsuta wrote the series, he said, "I wanted to describe the gap between what the public thought and what I saw inside. Ichiefu is...like my diary, but I am pleased if it has resulted in showing the workers' real lives."

== Release ==
The manga originated as a one-shot by Tatsuta for a competition run by Kodansha's seinen manga magazine Morning. It was published in the magazine on October 3, 2013, after winning the grand prize. The manga was then serialized from October 31, 2013, to October 8, 2015, and compiled into three volumes by Kodansha.

In June 2016, Kodansha USA listed an English edition of the manga on Amazon, later announcing its license at Anime Expo. The manga was subsequently published in an omnibus edition on March 7, 2017, including flipped artwork and some colored pages. The manga has also been licensed in France by Kana, in Italy by Star Comics, in Germany by Carlsen, in Spain by Norma Editorial, in Argentina by Ivrea Editorial and in Taiwan by Sharp Point Press.

== Reception ==
Amelia Cook of Otaku USA described the manga as true slice of life, finding fault in the artwork's faces, but complimenting its details, concluding that the manga is a "very human look at a sensationalized issue". Theron Martin of Anime News Network found the art to be "clean, very detail-rich, and appealing", noting that the work should appeal to non-manga readers. Robert Frazer of UK Anime Network called Tetsuta's non-sensationalist narrative approach "refreshing", although he criticized some of the choices Kodansha Comics made in bringing Ichi-F to the English market. Rhea Rollmann of PopMatters saw the manga as a potential new example of "working-class manga", but was critical of what she saw as Tatsuta's excessive neutrality and justification of precarity. Gabe Peralta of the Fandom Post liked the humanizing aspect of the work, finding the author's straightforward style to be its biggest strength and weakness.
