= Funsō deshitara Hatta made =

Japanese manga series

- First tankōbon volume cover, featuring Yuri Hatta

紛争でしたら八田まで
- Genre: Adventure; Mystery
- Manga
- Written by: Motohiro Den
- Published by: Kodansha
- Imprint: Morning KC
- Magazine: Morning; (November 21, 2019 – September 16, 2021); D Morning
- Original run: November 21, 2019 – present
- Volumes: 20
- Anime television series

Funsō deshitara Hatta made (Japanese: 紛争でしたら八田まで; lit. 'If It's a Dispute, Please Contact Hatta') is a Japanese manga series written and illustrated by Motohiro Den. It originally began serialization in Kodansha's Morning magazine in November 2019, before transferring to Kodansha's D Morning web service in October 2021. The series has been compiled into 20 volumes as of September 2026. An anime television series adaptation has been announced.

== Premise ==
Yuri Hatta, a woman with an interest in geopolitics and solving problems, previously worked at the UK-based geopolitics consultancy organization St. Paul's Assistance (S.P.A.). With conflicts taking place around the world, S.P.A. tasks her with going to countries and investigating and solving cases sent to her. Seeing conflict throughout the world, she aims to resolve conflicts using her knowledge and fighting skills.

== Characters ==
Yuri Hatta (八田 百合, Hatta Yuri)
A Japanese woman who previously worked at a geopolitics consultancy in Birmingham, England. The daughter of a Chinese-Singaporean father and a Japanese mother, she originally hails from Nagano Prefecture. She is interested in wrestling and uses wresting techniques to help solve the cases assigned to her. She is fond of trying out local delicacies.

== Development ==
The series is the debut serialization of Motohiro Den, who previously worked in advertising before pursuing a career in creating manga. Having only read a few manga, including Master Keaton, Den wanted to create a series that featured a female protagonist. The idea for a series that took place around the world came from his editor, with the series being partially inspired by Den's previous experience of living in England for six months. His time in England exposed him to various cultures and perspectives, while also appreciating Japan's differences with the rest of the world. Despite the manga being set in various countries, Den did not travel abroad for material, instead researching through the internet and books, as well as consulting with a real-life geopolitical consultant, to help flesh out settings and avoid inaccuracies.

== Media ==
=== Manga ===
The series written and illustrated by Motohiro Den began serialization in Kodansha's Morning on November 21, 2019, with the series also being serialized on Kodansha's D Morning web service. It was later transferred full-time to the D Morning service on October 14, 2021. The series is also available on Kodansha's Comic Days web service. The first tankōbon volume was released on March 23, 2020; 20 volumes have been released as of September 2026.

No.	Release date	ISBN
1	March 23, 2020	978-4-06-518920-7
2	June 23, 2020	978-4-06-519477-5
3	September 23, 2020	978-4-06-520779-6
4	December 23, 2020	978-4-06-521760-3
5	March 23, 2021	978-4-06-522556-1
6	June 23, 2021	978-4-06-523556-0
7	September 22, 2021	978-4-06-524783-9
8	January 21, 2022	978-4-06-526584-0
9	April 21, 2022	978-4-06-527573-3
10	August 23, 2022	978-4-06-528875-7
11	November 22, 2022	978-4-06-529815-2
12	March 23, 2023	978-4-06-531114-1
13	July 21, 2023	978-4-06-532395-3
14	December 21, 2023	978-4-06-534012-7
15	May 22, 2024	978-4-06-535582-4
16	October 22, 2024	978-4-06-537167-1
17	March 21, 2025	978-4-06-538842-6
18	September 22, 2025	978-4-06-540683-0
19	February 20, 2026	978-4-06-542539-8
20	September 18, 2026	978-4-06-544260-9

=== Anime ===
An anime television series adaptation was announced on September 14, 2026.

== Reception ==
In September 2026, it was reported that the series had over 1.2 million copies in circulation.
