= Complex Age =

Manga series by Yui Sakuma

- Cover of Complex Age volume one.

コンプレックス・エイジ (Konpurekkusu Eiji)
- Manga
- Written by: Yui Sakuma
- Published by: Kodansha
- English publisher: NA: Kodansha USA
- Magazine: Weekly Morning
- Original run: 22 May 2014 – 4 June 2015
- Volumes: 6

Complex Age (コンプレックス・エイジ, Konpurekkusu Eiji) is a Japanese manga series written and illustrated by Yui Sakuma. The series began as a one-shot published on Kodansha's Weekly Morning seinen manga website in May 2013. The one-shot drew 1.25 million viewers to the website and won a Tetsuya Chiba Prize. It was relaunched on 22 May 2014 and ran until 4 June 2015. The manga was licensed for release in North America by Kodansha USA. A comic video adaptation was released on the Morning website alongside the fifth volume in August 2015. The series was compiled into six volumes.

== Plot ==
Both continuity tell stories about a woman who have hobby in clothing, Gothic Lolita and cosplay respectively, while her age crept up and making her hobby socially inappropriate age-wise. The series' epilogue shows that the series' protagonist is one shot protagonist's daughter.

The original one-shot focused on Sawako, a married 34-year-old woman with an interest in the Gothic Lolita culture which she tries to conceal from her coworkers.

The 2014 series focused on 26 year old Nagisa Kataura, a cosplaying delivery company employee who also tries to hide her passion from her coworkers. She was voiced by Kyōko Narumi in the voice manga.

== Volume list ==
| No. | Original release date | Original ISBN | English release date | English ISBN |
|---|---|---|---|---|
| 1 | 22 August 2014 | 978-4-06-388365-7 | 14 June 2016 | 9781632362483 |
| 2 | 21 November 2014 | 978-4-06-388403-6 | 6 September 2016 | 9781632362490 |
| 3 | 23 February 2015 | 978-4-06-388431-9 | 13 December 2016 | 9781632362506 |
| 4 | 22 May 2015 | 978-4-06-388464-7 | 14 March 2017 | 9781632363282 |
| 5 | 21 August 2015 | 978-4-06-388495-1 | 13 June 2017 | 9781632364289 |
| 6 | 23 September 2015 | 978-4-06-388508-8 | 12 September 2017 | 9781632364685 |
