= Longing for Home =

Japanese manga series

- First tankōbon volume cover, featuring Taro Maizuru

望郷太郎へ (Bōkyō Tarō)
- Genre: Dystopian; Science fiction
- Manga
- Written by: Yoshihiro Yamada
- Published by: Kodansha
- English publisher: Kodansha
- Imprint: Morning KC
- Magazine: Morning
- Original run: September 5, 2019 – present
- Volumes: 15
- icon

Longing for Home (Japanese: 望郷太郎, Hepburn: Bōkyō Tarō; lit. 'Homesick Tarō') is a Japanese manga series written and illustrated by Yoshihiro Yamada. It has been serialized in Kodansha's seinen manga magazine Morning since September 2019.

== Plot ==
After a calamity causes Earth to enter an ice age, Taro Maizuru and his family evacuate to Basra, Iraq, where they temporarily enter artificial hibernation in an underground shelter until the ice age ends. Some time later, Taro wakes up to find the entire shelter abandoned. To his horror, he discovers that 500 years had passed, and his family are all dead after their hibernation machines failed. Without any companions or money, Taro begins his long trek across the world to Japan in search of a purpose in his life.

== Publication ==
Written and illustrated by Yoshihiro Yamada, Longing for Home started in Kodansha's seinen manga magazine Morning on September 5, 2019. Kodansha has collected its chapters into individual tankōbon volumes, with the first one released on December 23, 2019. As of July 22, 2026, 15 volumes have been published.

In August 2024, Kodansha began publishing the series in English on its K Manga digital service.

=== Volumes ===
No.	Japanese release date	Japanese ISBN
1	December 23, 2019	978-4-06-517990-1
2	May 22, 2020	978-4-06-518965-8
3	October 23, 2020	978-4-06-518996-2
4	March 23, 2021	978-4-06-522307-9
5	August 23, 2021	978-4-06-524103-5
6	February 22, 2022	978-4-06-526920-6
7	July 22, 2022	978-4-06-528556-5
8	January 23, 2023	978-4-06-530277-4
9	June 22, 2023	978-4-06-532013-6
10	January 23, 2024	978-4-06-534369-2
11	June 21, 2024	978-4-06-535956-3
12	January 22, 2025	978-4-06-535847-4
13	June 23, 2025	978-4-06-539771-8
14	January 22, 2026	978-4-06-542186-4
15	July 22, 2026	978-4-06-544294-4

== Reception ==
Alongside Blue Period, Longing for Home ranked fifteenth on Takarajimasha's Kono Manga ga Sugoi! list of best manga of 2021 for male readers. The manga was nominated for the 26th Tezuka Osamu Cultural Prize in 2022. It was nominated for the 48th Kodansha Manga Award in the general category in 2024.

== See also ==
- Hyouge Mono, another manga series by the same author
