= Anrakuan Sakuden =

Japanese priest

Anrakuan Sakuden (安楽庵策伝; 1554 – February 7, 1642) was an Edo period Japanese priest of the Jōdo-shū sect of Buddhism; devotee of the tea ceremony; connoisseur of camellias; and amateur poet. The name Anrakuan takes from the name of the tea house that he built and lived at after he retired at the age of seventy. He is famous as the author of the Seisuishō (醒睡笑, Laughs to Wake You Up), which is a collection of humorous anecdotes. The Seisuishō is considered a major progenitor of the popular Edo-period literary genre called hanashibon (咄本), books of humorous stories. For this reason, Anrakuan Sakuden has been called the founder of rakugo (落語), the popular form of comic monologue performed by special storytellers. Anrakuan is also known as the founder of the Anrakuan school of Japanese tea ceremony.

The Seisuishō, which Anrakuan Sakuden compiled in 1623 through the urging of Itakura Shigemune (1588–1656), the magistrate of Kyoto, consists of eight chapters, divided into volumes.

== See also ==
- Sorori Shinzaemon
