= Mitarai – Tantei Mitarai Kiyoshi no Jiken Kiroku =

Japanese manga series

ミタライ 探偵御手洗潔の事件記録 (Mitarai – Tantei Mitarai Kiyoshi no Jiken Kiroku)
- Genre: Mystery, Detective fiction
- Manga
- Written by: Soji Shimada
- Illustrated by: Tenka Hara
- Published by: Kodansha
- Imprint: Morning KC
- Magazine: Weekly Morning
- Original run: January 23, 2013 – April 23, 2014
- Volumes: 3
- Live-action television film

Tensai Tantei Mitarai ~Nankai Jiken File~ Kasa wo Oru Onna 天才探偵ミタライ～難解事件ファイル「傘を折る女」～
- Released: March 7, 2015

Mitarai – Tantei Mitarai Kiyoshi no Jiken Kiroku (ミタライ 探偵御手洗潔の事件記録; "Mitarai: Detective Kiyoshi Mitarai's Case Records") is a Japanese mystery seinen manga series written by Soji Shimada and illustrated by Tenka Hara. Published by Kodansha, it was serialized in the Weekly Morning manga magazine and was compiled into three volumes. A Japanese television drama adaptation, Tensai Tantei Mitarai ~Nankai Jiken File~ Kasa wo Oru Onna, was broadcast on Fuji Television on March 7, 2015.

== Plot ==
The series follows the cases of Kiyoshi Mitarai, an eccentric astrologer and brilliant detective with a background in neuroscience. Alongside his friend and roommate, the illustrator Kazumi Ishioka, Mitarai solves "impossible" crimes and bizarre mysteries that appear to have supernatural origins but are ultimately explained through rigorous logic. The manga specifically adapts several cases from Soji Shimada's long-running Detective Mitarai Kiyoshi's Casebook series.

== Characters ==
- Kiyoshi Mitarai (御手洗 潔): A genius polymath and private investigator known for his mood swings and sharp analytical mind.
- Kazumi Ishioka (石岡 和己): An author and illustrator who lives with Mitarai and records his cases, serving as the grounded narrator of their adventures.

== Volumes ==
The series was compiled into three tankōbon volumes by Kodansha under the Morning KC imprint.

- 1 (January 23, 2013)
- 2 (October 23, 2013)
- 3 (April 23, 2014)

== Reception ==
The series is recognized for adapting Soji Shimada's Shin-honkaku (New Orthodox) mystery style into a visual medium. The announcement of the live-action television adaptation in 2015, starring Hiroshi Tamaki as Mitarai, brought renewed attention to the manga. This was later followed by a theatrical film, The Clockwork Monkey Mystery (Seiro no Umi), released in 2016.
