= Home Office Romance =

Japanese manga series

- Cover of the volume

テレワァク与太話 (Terewāku Yotabanashi)
- Genre: Romantic comedy
- Manga
- Written by: Kintetsu Yamada
- Published by: Kodansha
- English publisher: NA: Kodansha USA
- Imprint: Morning KC
- Magazine: Morning
- Original run: November 2, 2022 – April 13, 2023
- Volumes: 1
- icon

Home Office Romance (Japanese: テレワァク与太話, Hepburn: Terewāku Yotabanashi; lit. 'Remote Working Idle Talk') is a Japanese manga series written and illustrated by Kintetsu Yamada. It was serialized in Kodansha's seinen manga magazine Morning from November 2022 to April 2023, with its chapters compiled into a single volume released in May 2023.

== Synopsis ==
The series is centered around Nokoru, a man who started teleworking due to a pandemic and discovers that his quality of life has improved in comparison to working in the office. As he decorates his balcony, he meets a woman named Natsu, and starts to get to know her well.

== Publication ==
Written and illustrated by Kintetsu Yamada, Home Office Romance was originally published as a one-shot in Kodansha's MANGA Day to Day manga anthology released in 2020. The one-shot was later included in Yamada's short story collection released on January 21, 2022. It was later serialized in Kodansha's seinen manga magazine Morning from November 2, 2022, to April 13, 2023. Its chapters were compiled into a single tankōbon volume on May 23, 2023.

During their panel at Anime NYC 2023, Kodansha USA announced that they had licensed the series for English publication in Q4 2024.

| No. | Original release date | Original ISBN | North American release date | North American ISBN |
|---|---|---|---|---|
| 1 | May 23, 2023 | 978-4-06-531643-6 | November 12, 2024 | 979-8-88877-292-8 |
1. "The Joys of a Home Office"; 2. "The Curse of a Home Office"; 3. "Dried Burdock"; 4. "A Dried Up Looking at the Moon"; 5. "Dumpling in Bamboo Leaves"; 6. "Bugs"; 7. "Electric Screwdriver"; 8. "Chicken Boiled in a Pot"; 9. "Thank-You Gifts"; 10. "At the Front"; 11. "Question and Answer"; 12. "Scheduling"; 13. "Nocturnal Detour"; 14. "Casual Conversation"; 15. "An Encouragement of Internet Shopping"; 16. "Hanging Out at Home"; 17. "Holding Pattern"; 18. "Waiting"; 19. "Beyond the Border"; 20. "If There's Something You Want to See"; 20.5. "Up All Night"
