= Hyouge Mono =

Japanese manga and anime series

- Japanese cover of the first manga volume

へうげもの (Hyōge Mono)
- Genre: Historical
- Manga
- Written by: Yoshihiro Yamada
- Published by: Kodansha
- Imprint: Morning KC
- Magazine: Weekly Morning
- Original run: 2005 – November 30, 2017
- Volumes: 25
- Anime television series
- Directed by: Kōichi Mashimo
- Written by: Sanjita basnet
- Music by: Kow Otani
- Studio: Bee Train
- Original network: NHK BS-Premium
- Original run: April 7, 2011 – January 26, 2012
- Episodes: 39

Hyouge Mono (Japanese: へうげもの; lit. "Jocular Fellow") (Note: へうげ is historical kana orthography for ひょうげ, and is pronounced as hyōge.) is a Japanese manga series written and illustrated by Yoshihiro Yamada. It was serialized in the seinen manga magazine Weekly Morning from 2005 to 2017 and collected into 25 tankōbon volumes by publisher Kodansha. Hyouge Mono won an Excellence Prize for manga at the 13th Japan Media Arts Festival in 2009. It also won the Grand Prize at the 14th Tezuka Osamu Cultural Prizes in 2010. The manga was adapted into an anime television series in 2011.

== Plot ==
During the Sengoku period in Japan, while the shadow of Oda Nobunaga still looms over the land, the warlord Furuta Sasuke loses his soul to the tea ceremony. While war shakes the world around him, he faces his own conflict between his desire for promotion and his love for his art.

== Characters ==
Furuta Sasuke (古田 左介)
Voiced by: Kōji Ōkura
A vassal of Oda Nobunaga. He is an aesthete, a person who holds a dear appreciation of art and beauty. He is obsessed with the form of glazed pottery, tea, and architecture. He is married to Osen (voiced by Megumi Toyoguchi).
Oda Nobunaga (織田 信長)
Voiced by: Rikiya Koyama
An ambitious man who seeks control over not only Japan, but also the Ming (Chinese) and Joseon (Korean) dynasties. Sasuke is one of his vassals.
Sen no Sōeki (千 宗易)
Voiced by: Nobuo Tanaka
The most influential tea master. He greedily pursues a life centered around the wabi worldview. Sasuke is one of his pupils.
Hashiba Hideyoshi (羽柴 秀吉)
Voiced by: Masashi Ebara
A sharp vassal of Oda Nobunaga who becomes a powerful person after Nobunaga's death. He likes women and has no sense of aesthetics.
Akechi Mitsuhide (明智 光秀)
Voiced by: Hideyuki Tanaka
An idealistic vassal of Oda Nobunaga, he feels antipathy to his lord's policy.
Tokugawa Ieyasu (徳川 家康)
Voiced by: Shingo Tsurumi
A loyal vassal from Mikawa. He has a strong sense of justice, and succeeds Oda in his work to reunify Japan.
Oda Nagamasu (織田 長益)
Voiced by: Tsutomu Isobe
A younger brother of Nobunaga. He is a smart playboy and smooth fellow.
Ishida Mitsunari (石田 三成)
Voiced by: Toshihiko Seki
A loyal vassal of Toyotomi Hideyoshi. He is a meticulous person and has little interest in art.

Other characters include Nobunaga's African retainer Yasuke (voiced by Takaya Kuroda), tea connoisseur Hechikan, Hideyoshi's wife Kita no Mandokoro and his concubine Lady Chacha, his mother Ōmandokoro, and the painter Hasegawa Tōhaku.

== Media ==
=== Manga ===
Hyouge Mono premiered in Kodansha's Weekly Morning magazine in 2005. It ended its serialization in the magazine's 2017 53rd issue on November 30, 2017. Kodansha collected the individual chapters into 25 tankōbon volumes published from December 21, 2005, to January 23, 2018.

=== Anime ===
The manga was adapted into an anime television series directed by Kōichi Mashimo and animated by Bee Train. It aired for 39 episodes on the NHK's Broadcast Satellite (BS) channels from April 7, 2011, to January 26, 2012.

The first opening theme of the anime is "Bowl Man" by Cro-Magnon featuring Yoshi Ikuzō, and the ending theme is "KIZUNA" by Yuki Saito. In April 2011, Cro-Magnon band member Tsuyoshi Kosuga was arrested on suspicion of violating Japan's Cannabis Control Law. As a result, the NHK changed the opening theme to "Naghol Jumping" by Quasimode for episodes five through ten. Starting with episode 11, the opening was changed to "Ebi Sukui" by Taku Takahashi of m-flo.

In June 2011, for unstated reasons, series creator Yoshihiro Yamada and the editors of Weekly Morning quit consulting for the anime series, and Yamada had his credit changed from the author of the "original story" to the author of the "original concept".

==== Episodes ====
No.	Title	Original release date
1	"Would You Die for a Teakettle!?"; Transliteration: "Kimi wa Mono no Tame ni Shineruka!?" (Japanese: 君は物のために死ねるか!?)	April 7, 2011
Furuta Sasuke, a 34-year-old vassal of Oda Nobunaga, is sent on a diplomatic mission to Shigisan Castle to negotiate with Matsunaga Hisahide, a general who betrayed Nobunaga and allied with the Mori Clan and Ikko-ikki. Nobunaga instructs Sasuke to offer Hisahide a pardon for the betrayal in exchange for the Hiragumo teakettle, a highly-prized and artistic piece. October 1577 is the date of the siege. On the day of the negotiations, Hisahide refuses to surrender, instead filling the teakettle with gunpowder and strapping it to his chest. After the kettle explodes, Sasuke manages to preserve the top of it. In 1578, the first of Nobunaga's immense sea vessels are completed, known as the Great Atakabune, and it is set on display in the harbor. A merchant disparages Nobunaga for spending so much on the fleet, and Nobunaga, overhearing, kills him, not for the disparagement, but for not sticking to his opinion. The lord then, as a test, asks Sasuke whether the Hiragumo teakettle or the Great Atakabune military vessel is superior.
2	"Fantasy of the Tea Room"; Transliteration: "Chashitsu no Fantajī" (Japanese: 茶室のファンタジー)	April 14, 2011
Sasuke provides a satisfying answer. The lord turns the question to his three tea masters, and each in turn agrees on the perfectness of the Great Atakabune except for Sen no Soeki. Soeki remarks that the vessels would be much improved if they were all painted black. Nobunaga takes this suggestion without anger. At home, Sasuke meets with his brother-in-law, Nakagawa Kiyohide, before his brother-in-law departs for war under his lord Araki Murashige. Sasuke ponders on the beauty of a glazed pottery piece, and analogizes it in aesthetic value to his wife, Osen. Later, word arrives that Murashige has rebelled against Nobunaga. Sasuke is ordered to go to his brother-in-law and persuade him to surrender. When Sasuke arrives at Ibaraki Castle, he is dressed entirely in white armor. Kiyohide is surprised, but refuses to surrender and go against his lord Murashige. Sasuke reveals that he has brought his wife along, Osen, who is also Kiyohide's sister, and tells Kiyohide that since Kiyohide will die fighting if he does not surrender, it is only honorable that his family also suffer the same fate. Sasuke aims his blade for Osen's neck. Kiyohide surrenders. In the subsequent campaign, Nobunaga's forces corner Murashige, and Sasuke seeks Murashige's death to reap the rewards offered. Upon finding Murashige, Sasuke attacks, only to have the legendary tea bowl Araki Kourai fall out. Murashige exchanges the tea bowl for his freedom. Later, Sasuke is invited by Senno Soeki for a tea ceremony, in which Soeki uses an exact replica of the Araki Kourai. Sasuke is torn by what he sees as a betrayal to his own lord and Soeki's knowledge of his actions.
3	"Stairway to Heaven"; Transliteration: "Tenkai e no Kaidan" (Japanese: 天界への階段)	April 21, 2011
Sasuke confesses his actions to Soeki who in turns reveals Murashige already told him, as it was Soeki that lent the Araki Kourai to Murashige. Soeki also asks Sasuke to return the bowl. Sasuke accepts and ask if he can become Soeki's disciple. Soeki accepts. Sasuke later goes to Azuchi Castle and is captivated by its features. There he meets with Nobunaga that discloses his ambition to unify Japan only to then wage war against the continent. Another day Sasuke has tea at Hashiba's with a bowl from Komogai, a present from Nobunaga. Hashiba asks Sasuke a recount of a banquet that was hosted by Mitsuhide to celebrate his nomination to oversee the Kinki region. During the banquet, Akechi Hidemitsu insults Nobunaga. As Nobunaga's retainer Sasuke challenges him but Mitsuhide intervenes and makes Hidemitsu apologize. Mitsuhide justifies the conduct of Nobunaga through his dedication to his ideal, professing absolute loyalty between lord and retainer. Mitsuhide then go make tea using a regular round kettle instead of the Hakkaku, a present from Nobunaga, as would have been expected on this occasion. Sasuke can't help but wonder why.
4	"Kind of Black"; Transliteration: "Kaindo obu burakku" (Japanese: カインド・オブ・ブラック)	April 28, 2011
February 1581, Nobunaga organizes a parade through Kyoto to show his forces to the emperor. The three teamasters (Tsuda Sougyuu, Imai Soukyuu, Senno Soueki) in the audience assess the wardrobes of different generals: Nobunaga, Mitsuhide, Shibata, Sasuke, Oda Nagamasu. After, Nobunaga walking with his three sons (Nobutada, Nobukatsu, Nobutaka) congratulates Mitsuhide on his efforts. Mitsuhide uses the opportunity to ask Nobunaga to end the exile of general Sakuma Nobumori. Arguing he's trying to establish a new order, Nobunaga refuses asserting men older than him are no longer of use. Soeki has a master potter Chojiro craft him a black teabowl. In May, Hideyoshi and Sasuke go to Soeki's for tea. There Hideyoshi is introduced to Soeki's daughter Ogin. Sasuke go prepare tea with another disciple of Soeki, Souji. Souji, who has seen five times the masterpieces Sasuke has, teaches him about the value of tea jars. Sasuke mentions the Tsukumonasu, but Souji says three surpass it. Meanwhile, Hideyoshi tells Soeki about his battles against the Mori. Soeki then points that like Hideyoshi he is the son of a commoner, and that he ultimately wants Hideyoshi to rule, not Nobunaga.
5	"Savoir Faire"; Transliteration: "Ketsui no Kakehiki" (Japanese: 決意のかけひき)	May 5, 2011
August 1581, Hideyoshi lays siege to Tottori Castle. Hashiba Hidenaga with Soeki secretly dressed in armor arrive to talk with Hideyoshi. Hideyoshi accepts to overthrow Nobunaga. Sasuke has two brothers-in-law: Nakagawa Kiyohide, brother of Osen (Sasuke's wife) and Takayama Ukon, who wedded Sasuke's sister. Ordered by Nobunaga, Takayama Ukon brings Ise steeds to Hideyoshi. Sasuke drinks with him while discussing the three tea jars Nitta, Hatsuhana, Narashiba. Later Hideyoshi displays eight masterpieces to Sasuke: he must pick the most modest one and give it to Mitsuhide. He chooses a teascoop made by Shutoku but replaces it with one he made. Hideyoshi delivers the teascoop while trying to sway Mitsuhide into rebellion. As a stratagem he wounds himself in order to cry in front of Mitsuhide.
6	"Let's Spend the Takeda"; Transliteration: "Takeda o Buttobase" (Japanese: 武田をぶっとばせ)	May 12, 2011
January 1582, a room in Azuchi Castle designed to welcome the emperor reminds Sasuke that he needs to hurry before his chances of becoming a lord vanish. Why he decides to accomplish more war feats. Soeki visits general Hosokawa to test his loyalty to Nobunaga. Sasuke visits the potter Katou Kagenobu and has him make a cruder version of an Ido teabowl. February, the Nobunaga's forces are out to subdue Takeda Katsuyori. One army led by Ieyasu and Hojo Ujimasa will attack Katsuyori, Oda Nagamasa will attack Fukashi Castle, one will attack Takatou Castle defended by Takeda's brother Nishina Morinobu. But the Fukuyou Castle near Takatou must be subdued with minimal troops. Sasuke volunteers to do it. Pretending the simple wares Katou made are masterpieces, he persuades the retainers to flee. March, Takatou Castle still stands when Oda's forces must soon assist Ieyasu's fight against Katsuyori. They will attack at dawn, but Sasuke goes and tries to persuade Morinobu once more. Dispatching crude wares to one guard, and poor intercourse to another, he manages to reach Morinobu, only to be kicked through the window as soon as he is in sight.
7	"Mt. Fuji Skyline"; Transliteration: "Maunto Fuji Sukairain" (Japanese: mt.富士スカイライン)	May 19, 2011
January 1582, Soueki discusses with Hidenaga: Nobunaga plans to go to Kyoto to visit the merchant Shimai Shoushitsu who owns the Narashiba teajar. Being lightly protected it would be a perfect time for Mitsuhide to attack him at Honnō temple. March, Sasuke survived the fall only to be moqued by Nobunaga. Still for his efforts in conquering Fukuyou castle, he's rewarded governance over a 200 koku manor, having now 400 koku in total. Takigawa Kazumasu is honoured as the conqueror of Kai by Nobunaga. In reward he asks for the Jukou Konasu tea jar. He's denied but granted rule over disadvantageous Kantou instead. Mitsuhide reads a letter from Hideyoshi saying he would be denied rule over Shikoku he conquered. Later, Nobunaga confirms it by telling Mitsuhide his son Nobutada will rule over Shikoku. As Mitsuhide is angered, Nobunaga discloses this is only the first step in its plan to become emperor. April, Kuroda Yoshitaka and Hachisuka Masakatsu arrive at Hideyoshi's camp who is still fighting the Mori. They want him to attack Shimizu Munearu who holds Takamatsu castle. But Hideyoshi prefers to flood the castle using the Kawazugahana river. Though it is only a ploy to buy time while waiting for Mitsuhide to kill Nobunaga. May, Soueki and Sasuke visits Mitsuhide. They discuss a future banquet in Azuchi to celebrate victory over the Takeda. Soueki promise to provide food, with Souji and Sasuke as assistants. From how the Hakkaku is set, Soueki notices the desperation of Mitsuhide and is convinced he will take actions soon.
8	"Eat It"; Transliteration: "Koyoi wa Īto Itto" (Japanese: 今宵はイートイット)	May 26, 2011
Tokugawa Ieyasu comes to Azuchi for the banquet. Ieyasu is granted rule of Suruga, but is angered by the luxury displayed by Nobunaga, especially a pineapple dessert served by Sasuke on his orders. Mori Terumoto moves to Bicchu to recapture Takamatsu castle. Nobunaga sends Mitsuhide to Hideyoshi to help him. Sasuke with Nakagawa Kiyohide is to relay those orders to Hosokawa, Takayama, and Ikeda. Seeing Nobunaga lean on the furniture, Sasuke has a bad feeling. He ponders aloud to Mitsuhide about the vanity of nurturing ambitions, but Mitsuhide reassures him. Later Ieyasu visits Mitsuhide to apologize for his outburst: they share their discontentment as two loyal retainers. Hideyoshi has flooded Takamatsu castle, and goes welcoming Nobunaga to Chuugoku, leaving Hidenaga in command. Sasuke, readying for departure, is given a new Iwai armor by Osen. She requested it from general Hosokawa Tadaoki. Gazing upon it, his ambitions to attain lordship return.
9	"Ruthless License"; Transliteration: "Hijō no Raisensu" (Japanese: 非情のライセンス)	June 2, 2011
May 29, 1582, Sasuke is still readying: he will only be able to feed half of his 50 men. He then receives a rather crude Bizen bowl said to be worth a 1000 koku from Hideyoshi. June 1, Nobunaga plans to go to war on Kyushu against Chousokabe, and requires the assistance of Hakata merchants Kamiya Soutan and Shimai Shoushitsu. Courtiers ask him to take a position in the imperial court: either shogun, grand advisor, or grand counsellor. He refuses claiming the title of God of the Realm, since he has more masterpieces than any previous shogun although he is still lacking two tea jars. Sasuke arrives at Kiyohide's. He wants to go to Honnō temple to view the masterpieces, but Kiyohide dissuades him from doing so. Mistuhide informs four trusted retainers he plans to murder Nobunaga. Soueki arrives at Honnō temple with a load of gunpowder under the pretext that it is for the war against the Mori. Nobunaga dines with Nobutada and Nagamasu. He wants Nobutada to inherit his rule using masterpieces as tools of influence, with a less licentious Nagamasu as his advisor. Mitsuhide moves his troops to Honnō temple. While carving a tea scoop, Sasuke has a foreboding of doom regarding Nobunaga. Nobunaga, woken up by the stone frog, is slashed in half by Hideyoshi.
10	"God of Sorrow"; Transliteration: "Kanashimi no Tenshu" (Japanese: 哀しみの天主)	June 9, 2011
In his last moments, Nobunaga prepares tea for Hideyoshi using his own blood. Mitsuhide attacks the temple while Hideyoshi loots the masterpieces. Always keeping the Narashiba on his person, Shimai Shoushitsu along with Kamiya Soutan escape. Hideyoshi has set the explosives provided by Soueki in Nobunaga's room. While escaping, he is seen and his accomplice is killed by Yasuke. Mitsuhide's troops allow civilians to leave the battlefield. Amongst them is concealed Hideyoshi. Sasuke departs for Honnō temple because of his anxiety. Nobutada flees Myokaku temple to Niji castle where the regents and the imperial prince are. Mitsuhide cease hostilities while the imperial party exits the castle. Nagamasu thinks suicide is the only option left. He assists Nobutada, but when it is his turn he runs for his life dressed as a woman. Sasuke sees Akechi forces guarding Kyoto, and realizes Mitsuhide must have rebelled. He goes off road to reach a burned-down Honnō temple. While searching the rumble, Sasuke meets Nagamasu. They're attacked by Mitsuhide's men, but Yasuke saves them and hands them the masterpieces he found on Hideyoshi's accomplice. Nagamasu and Sasuke each take one as a memento, while Nagamasu instructs Yasuke to deliver the rest to the Oda clan.
11	"Orphan Message"; Transliteration: "Koritsu no Messēji" (Japanese: 孤立のメッセージ)	June 16, 2011
Yasuke goes in search of Nobunaga's killer. Sasuke prays for the rest of Nobunaga's soul, leaving the tea scoop as an offering. Nagamasa asks Sasuke for safe haven while they flee Kyoto. Hosokawa Tadaoki and his father Fujitaka receive a letter from Mitsuhide asking to join the rebellion. Tadaoki wants to go and kill him, but Fujitaka knocks him out and shaves both their heads. June 3, back home Sasuke examines his prize: the Seitaka tea jar. Nagamasa wonders if he should serve Shibata, who is with Hashiba and Tokugawa one of the three most influential generals. He leaves for Gifu. Sasuke shall go to Ibaraki where Kiyohide resides. Ieyasu decides to return to Mikawa through Iga. Once in Iga, Hanzou is to rally men from Iga and Kouga to help them. A messenger from Mitsuhide reaches Hidenaga, proposing an alliance. Hidenaga kills him, then shows the letter to his general, pretending it was destined to the Mori. Since the negotiations of peace with the Mori clan are almost completed (only lacking the approval of Mori Terumoto), Hidenaga orders the troops to withdraw to Himeji castle where Hideyoshi is supposed to be. June 4, general Gamo Katahide, who occupied Azuchi castle, flees before Mitsuhide forces without taking the masterpieces. Once in the keep, Mitsuhide splits the masterpieces amongst his retainers and instructs to go to war against Shibata Katsuie. A messenger brings news of the Hosokawa's intentions not to ally with anybody. June 05, Kiyohide has received several letters. He must choose to ally between Hideyoshi and Mitsuhide. Upon Sasuke's counsel, he chooses Hideyoshi.
12	"White Castle Blues"; Transliteration: "Howaito Kyassuru Burūsu" (Japanese: ホワイトキャッスルブルース)	June 23, 2011
June 6, 1582, Sasuke goes to Himeji castle inform Hideyoshi of Kiyohide's decision. Hideyoshi explains his swift return was for grieving. Ikeda, Takayama, Niwa, Nobutaka have already allied with him. Hidenaga and Hideyoshi will meet at Amagasaki castle to engage Mitsuhide's forces before Shibata does. Hideyoshi then promises lordship to Sasuke. June 7, Mitsuhide sends the Hatsuhana to Ieyasu with an offer of alliance. Unsure what to do, Ieyasu starts conscription while waiting for new developments. June 8, Mitsuhide puts Hidemitsu in charge of Azuchi. He deplores Hosokawa and Tsutsui have not joined him. Soueki gazing upon the new whiteness of Azuchi, has his heart stolen for a moment. June 9, Hideyoshi tells Sasuke he will need a hostage from Kiyohide. June 10, in fact he does not need one, it was a ploy to strengthen Ikeda's and Takayama loyalty. Araki Murashige, now called Doufun, brings news of Ashikaga Yoshiaki joining Hideyoshi. In exchange of the Momojiri vase, Murashige also asks Hideyoshi for pardon. Hideyoshi accepts. Sasuke then designs the banner under which the retainers of Nobunaga will exert revenge.
13	"Aesthete's Roast"; Transliteration: "Sukiyaki" (Japanese: スキヤキ)	June 30, 2011
June 1582, Mitsuhide prepares for battle at Horagatouge pass when he learns Hideyoshi's forces have retreated from Takamatsu. Mitsuhide then realizes he's been used by Hideyoshi. The armies will clash near Kyoto at Oyamazaki. June 12, Ieyasu decides to go assist Mitsuhide with 15 000 men. June 13, Kiyohide's armies controls Mount Tenno and Koizumi river. They are the rear-guard of Hideyoshi's forces. Takayama occupies the vanguard. Hideyoshi arrives with Hidenaga, Nobutaka, Niwa. When asked to hoist a revenge banner, only Ueda Satarou who is struck by the peculiar design is willing to. Satarou is known for killing Mitsuhide's son Tsuda Nobusumi. Takayama is having a dish he learned from the Portuguese. Attracted by the fumes, Sasuke joins him. Needing additional vigor, Sasuke drinks an overly large and strong tea he brewed in his helmet. The display is witnessed by Satarou. Hideyoshi's forces number 40,000 men. They overwhelm Mitsuhide's 15,000. His only chance of winning is to take Mount Tenno. Knowing it will mean his death, his faithful retainer Saitou will undertake the task. The battle starts: Yasuke saves Sasuke and tells him the killer of Nobunaga was Hideyoshi. Sceptical at first, Sasuke realizes this must be true. But he soon forsakes revenge for survival.
14	"Sorrow of the Midnight Purple"; Transliteration: "Kanashimi no Middonaito Pāpuru" (Japanese: 哀しみのミッドナイト・パープル)	July 7, 2011
June 13, 1582, on his way Ieyasu learns Hideyoshi leads 40,000 men. Reminded of his defeat at Mikatagahara, he turns away. Mitsuhide's position in Shouryuuji castle is surrounded. Monks from Enryaku temple, who honour Mitsuhide as the killer of Oda, propose him to flee there since Sakamoto castle is already under assault. June 14, Hiroko, the wife of Mitsuhide in Sakamoto, wants to give the masterpieces to the enemy. Hideyoshi had a similar objective in mind, why the commander sends Sasuke to retrieve them. Akechi Hidemitsu hands them, managing to hit Sasuke with the Hakkaku on the head as he bore grudge against him since the banquet in Azuchi. Near Sakamoto, Enryaku temple warriors attack Mitsuhide for the destruction he performed under Oda's orders. Saving the life of the monk Zaifu, Mitsuhide is struck to the death. More violent monks appear, but Ieyasu arrives.
15	"The Times are A-changing"; Transliteration: "Jidai wa Kawaru" (Japanese: 時代は変わる)	July 14, 2011
June 15, 1582, Nobukatsu is in Azuchi castle, and grants its guard to Gamon Masahide. Soueki advises to burn down the main tower. June 20, in Ibaraki, Kiyohide asks Sasuke to take care of the Nakagawa clan if something happens to him. Hideyoshi holds the son of Nobutada, Sanpouchi, as hostage. Sasuke asks for Yasuke's freedom. Hideyoshi accepts, and warns that should Sasuke spread the same rumors about Hideyoshi being in Honnō temple, he will die. Shibata gets closer to Oichi, Nobunaga's sister, assuring he'll get revenge for her someday. The daughter she had with Azai Nagamasa, Ochacha 13, tells Nagamasu she'll only wear fancy clothes. November 1582, Sasuke visits the Taian tea lodge conceived by Soueki in Yamazaki castle. During the ceremony, Soueki names the concept shibui. Examining his possessions, Sasuke decides to get rid of a foreign chest given to him by Nobunaga. He tries to bury it, but Osen salvages and stores it.
16	"Tweets of Separation"; Transliteration: "Betsuri no Tsubuyaki" (Japanese: 別離のつぶやき)	July 21, 2011
October 1584, a tea ceremony in Kyoto with Sasuke, Soueki, Hosokawa Tadaoki, Gamon Matsuhide, Takayama Ukon. Soueki advises them to have an aesthete's heart like Sasuke. Ukon shows Sasuke a new cloth from Nanban: its colour is called "olive". A memorial is held for Kiyohide, who has been dead for a year. Sasuke is the guardian of his eldest son Nakagawa Hidemasa, and earns 12,000 koku now. Hidemasa is currently fighting the Tokugawa. November 1584, Kobe, Hideyoshi has been sieging Tokugawa (ally of Nobukatsu) for six months, with Ishida Mitsunari as his aide. He now sends Sasuke to tell Ieyasu that he is about to make peace with Nobukatsu. Ieyasu won't then have a reason to fight and will retreat. When Hideyoshi defeated Shibata, Ieyasu gave him the Hatsuhana, which he will know lend to Sasuke for his services. Ieyasu has Nagamasu at his side. Almost having a fit of rage during the banquet, Sasuke ends the negotiations well and the armistice is decided. Sasuke also purloined an Iga stone plate.
17	"Changing Man"; Transliteration: "Chenjingu Man" (Japanese: チェンジング・マン)	July 28, 2011
March 1585, Sasuke holds a tea ceremony for Soueki and Souji in Ibaraki using the Hatsuhana. Soueki scolds Sasuke for copying his tea room, the Taian. Meanwhile, Hideyoshi has been promoted chief advisor of the emperor, and Sasuke will soon be promoted as well. July comes, Sasuke gets promoted in Oozaka castle: as a daimyo, he's no longer Nakagawa's guardian, rules the west hills of Yamashiro province, and earns 35,000 koku. He's allowed to choose his own title: after some deliberation, he chooses "Oribe", inspired by the olive dyed clothes Ukon showed him earlier. Later, Sasuke marries his daughter Sen to Furuta Shigetsugu so they can manage the Nakagawa house. On his way to his potter in Mino, Sasuke is joined by Ueda Sataro. Choujirou made him an Imayaki: a Seto black tea bowl. He gives Hanshichi from Muta no Boraga instructions to make a Shinoyaki with a red mark. In memory of the Six Works of Seto of Nobunaga, Sasuke then commissions his men to be the Ten works of Oribe.
18	"Only One Flower in the World"; Transliteration: "Sekai de Hitotsu Dake no Hana" (Japanese: 世界で一つだけの華)	August 4, 2011
1585, In Oozaka castle, Imai Soukyuu gets dismissed as tea master; Soueki will have the position. Hideyoshi courts Ochacha, now 15. Sasuke is sent to excuse him to his wife One, who owns the title Kita no Mandokoro. Kato Kiyomasa, the chief tax collector arrives. He brings a Tsujigahana dyed kimono. One doesn't want it and generously gives it Sasuke for Osen. Hideyoshi and Ochacha arrive in his bedchambers. She reluctantly gives herself up to him, acknowledging this as the only chance she has at power. Hideyoshi agrees, saying she reminds him of her uncle, Oda Nobunaga. He drugs her with an aphrodisiac and ties her up before having sex. To contrast this, Sasuke and Osen have a normal, loving relationship. He gives her the kimono he received earlier and they spend the night together. Many months later, in August, in order to assume his new position, Soueki is given a new name by the chief priest of Daitoku temple Kokei Souchin: Sen no Rikyuu. Afterwards, Soueki, Hideyoshi, and Hidenaga discuss political matters over tea. Soueki proclaims the emperor unnecessary and suggests poisoning him. Hideyoshi, furious, stabs Soueki. Soueki, unperturbed by the assault, praises Hideyoshi's honor and bravery before pledging his unending loyalty. Ultimately, Hideyoshi heeds Soueki's advice and the two plan to assassinate the emperor. An opportunity arises in January 1586, in the golden tea room Soueki made. During the act, the emperor acknowledges Hideyoshi. Grateful, Hideyoshi spares him. In February, Araki Doufun meets with Sasuke. He's dying, and in exchange of one of his treasures, he wants Sasuke to find his son and tell him the story of his survival. Sasuke picks a ritual tea stand from Korea as payment.
19	"Woman from Nagoya"; Transliteration: "Ūman Furomu Nagoya" (Japanese: ウーマン・フロム・ナゴヤ)	August 26, 2011
March 1586, Sasuke and Sataro look for the golden tea room in Ozaka castle. In Settsu, Hideyoshi talks with his brother Hidenaga. Since he didn't poison the emperor, they need a new plan to control the citizenry in case the emperor decides to support Mori or Tokugawa. Another problem is the emperor's successor Sanehito Shinnou, who must be eliminated. With Shinnou out of the picture, Hideyoshi would become the guardian of the grandchild Sanpouchi and control the court. May, in Toutoumi, Ieyasu has wed Hideyoshi's sister Asahi. Ootomo Sourin displays a Shiga Pot while Hideyoshi dances. He has promised the Katatsugi tea jar Nitta if Toyotomi can pacify Kyushu (Shimai Shoushitus still owns the Narashiba). Hideyoshi put Mitsunari in charge of monetary matters between Sakai and Hakata. In Uchino, a new administrative center is built, the Jurakudai. Sasuke meets the painter Hasegawa Touhaku there, and asks him to paint his mansion. June, a meeting between Sakakibara Yasumasa (retainer of Tokugawa), Ishikawa and Soueki. The two want the two houses to work together. Soueki puts a black square tea bowl on display, a price of 700 kan is offered. To get ideas for his mansion, Soueki proposes Sasuke takes a trip to Yamashina.
20	"The Large Hole of Imperfection"; Transliteration: "Wabi no Ōana" (Japanese: わびの大穴)	September 2, 2011
21	"First Love"; Transliteration: "Hatsukoi" (Japanese: 初恋)	September 9, 2011
22	"The Devil's Whisper"; Transliteration: "Akuma no Sasayaki" (Japanese: 悪魔のささやき)	September 16, 2011
23	"Come On, My Juraku"; Transliteration: "Kamona Mai Juraku" (Japanese: カモナ・マイ・聚楽)	September 23, 2011
24	"Take Me to Kitano"; Transliteration: "Watashi o Kitano ni Tsuretette" (Japanese: 私を北野に連れてって)	September 30, 2011
25	"Start from the Beginning Again"; Transliteration: "Ichi Kara Denaoshimasu" (Japanese: 一から出直します)	October 7, 2011
26	"The Cursed Night"; Transliteration: "Norowareshi Yoru" (Japanese: 呪われし夜)	October 14, 2011
27	"Anarchy in Japan"; Transliteration: "Anākī in Hinomoto" (Japanese: アナーキーin日の本)	October 21, 2011
28	"Furuta Oribe and Fires"; Transliteration: "Furuta Oribe to Faiyāzu" (Japanese: 古田織部とファイヤーズ)	October 28, 2011
29	"Kanto Survival"; Transliteration: "Kantou Sāvaivu" (Japanese: 関東サーヴァイヴ)	November 4, 2011
Hideyoshi kills Souji and sends his head in a box to Soueki.
30	"Edo Frontier"; Transliteration: "EDO Furontia" (Japanese: EDOフロンティア)	November 11, 2011
Soueki hallucinates flies.
31	"Forgive My Silence"; Transliteration: "Mukuchi de Go-men" (Japanese: 無口で御・免)	November 18, 2011
Soueki, still sick, dances for Hideyoshi.
32	"Aesthete's Crossroad"; Transliteration: "Sukisha no Kurosurōdo" (Japanese: 数奇者のクロスロード)	November 25, 2011
Nagamasu becomes a monk.
33	"The Shadow Tea King"; Transliteration: "Ankoku no Tī-ō" (Japanese: 暗黒のTea-王)	December 2, 2011
Hideyoshi asks for the Hashitate tea pot, and for Soueki's daughter, Ogin.
34	"The Crybaby Under the Sun"; Transliteration: "Nichirin no Kuraibeibī" (Japanese: 日輪のクライベイビー)	December 9, 2011
35	"New Guilty Partner"; Transliteration: "Shin Giruti Pātonā" (Japanese: 新・ギルティパートナー)	December 16, 2011
36	"You're the Chosen One"; Transliteration: "Honmei wa Omae da" (Japanese: 本命はお前だ)	December 23, 2012
37	"The Man Who Destroyed the World"; Transliteration: "Sekai o Watta Otoko" (Japanese: 「世界」を割った男)	December 30, 2012
38	"Dusk at Yodo River"; Transliteration: "Yodogawa, Tasogare" (Japanese: 淀川、黄昏)	January 19, 2012
Soueki is consigned to Sakai, Sasuke and Tadaoki see him off. Murder attempts on Hideyoshi, one from Ogin who poisons herself.
39	"Aren't You a Fan of Imperfection?"; Transliteration: "Wabi Sukī ga, Osuki Deshō" (Japanese: わびスキーが、お好きでしょう。)	January 26, 2012
Sasuke assists Soueki in his ritual suicide.

== Reception ==
Hyouge Mono won an Excellence Prize for manga at the 13th Japan Media Arts Festival in 2009. It also won the Grand Prize at the 14th Tezuka Osamu Cultural Prizes in 2010.

== See also ==
- Longing for Home, another manga series by the same author
