= Meibutsuki =

Descriptions of Tea Ceremony utensils

Meibutsuki (名物記, lit. 'Records of famous objects'), are records of Tea Ceremony utensils. Many were compiled by the Matsudaira family. The most famous was compiled by Matsudaira Morimura, but others, such as the Sansatsu Meibutsuki created by Matsudaira Sakonshogen also exist. They describe the lineage and history of various tea vessels, classifying them by either age or ownership.

== See also ==
- Hyouge Mono, a manga about collecting meibutsuki
