= Tensai Yanagisawa Kyōju no Seikatsu =

Japanese manga series

- First tankōbon volume cover, featuring Yoshinori Yanagisawa

天才柳沢教授の生活
- Genre: Comedy; Slice of life
- Manga
- Written by: Kazumi Yamashita
- Published by: Kodansha
- Magazine: Morning
- Original run: January 1988 – April 4, 2013 (on hiatus)
- Volumes: 34
- Television drama
- Original network: Fuji TV
- Original run: October 16, 2002 – December 11, 2002
- Episodes: 9
- icon

Tensai Yanagisawa Kyōju no Seikatsu (Japanese: 天才柳沢教授の生活; lit. 'The Life of Genius Professor Yanagisawa') is a Japanese manga series written and illustrated by Kazumi Yamashita. It started in Kodansha's seinen manga magazine Morning in January 1988; its latest chapter was released in April 2013. Its chapters have been collected in 34 tankōbon volumes.

In 2003, the manga won the 27th Kodansha Manga Award in the general category.

== Synopsis ==
The manga follows the life of Yoshinori Yanagisawa, a professor in economics at the University of Y and former war veteran who lives with his wife, Masako, and his four daughters. Adhering to strict everyday rituals and rules, Yanagisawa logically goes through each event in his life, coming off as cold despite harboring deep affection and curiosity for people. Each chapter in the manga consists of a self-contained story.

== Media ==
=== Manga ===
Written and illustrated by Kazumi Yamashita, Tensai Yanagisawa Kyōju no Seikatsu began serialization in Kodansha's seinen manga magazine Morning in January 1988. (Note: Debuted in the magazine's seventh issue of 1988, cover dated January 29.) Its most recent chapter was published on April 4, 2013. Kodansha has collected its chapters into individual tankōbon volumes. The first volume was released on September 22, 1989. The 34th and latest volume was released on June 21, 2013.

=== Drama ===
A nine-episode television drama series adaptation was broadcast on Fuji TV from October 16 to December 11, 2002.

== Reception ==
In 2003, the manga won the 27th Kodansha Manga Award in the general category.
