= Sorori Shinzaemon =

Japanese comedian, jester, and retainer

- 曽呂利 新左衛門
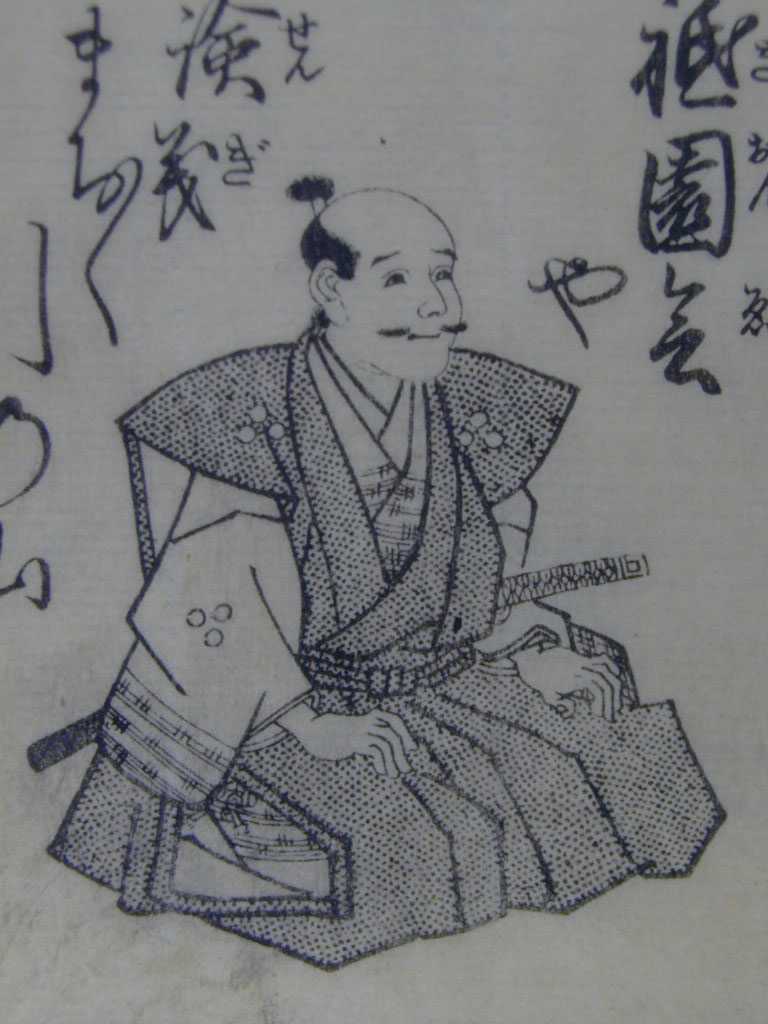
- 1849 illustration

Personal details
- Born: Unknown Sakai, Izumi Province, Japan
- Died: c. 1600 Japan

Sorori Shinzaemon (Japanese: 曽呂利 新左衛門; fl. 1587–1600) was the stage name of Sugimori Hikoemon (杉森 彦右衛門), a semi-legendary Japanese comedian, jester, and retainer of Toyotomi Hideyoshi. He is regarded as the progenitor of rakugo.

== Biography ==
Sorori was originally a scabbard-maker of Sakai, a major commercial center. He studied the art of chanoyu under Takeno Jō'ō, and was also versed in kyōka. His scabbards were especially well-made and swords could be swiftly and easily drawn from them. Because of this, he was given the nickname sorori (そろり; lit. 'smooth'). At some point, he became a retainer of Hideyoshi. Thereafter he was renowned for his laconic wit and wisdom.

Sorori is best known through the many anecdotes depicting his interactions with Hideyoshi. In one, a variation of the ancient wheat and chessboard problem is attributed to him. In another, after Sorori had farted in his presence, Hideyoshi beat him over the head and buttocks with a shaku. Sorori then composed a poem: "Having thus farted, I received two provinces: Harima on my head, and Bitchū on my ass" (おならして国二ヶ国を得たりけり頭はりまに尻はびっちう).

For many years, the relative scarcity of contemporary manuscripts mentioning Sorori gave rise to a theory that he was actually the same person as Anrakuan Sakuden, another comedian of the period. However, according to Kitagawa Hiroshi, a diary from 1587 belonging to the kuge Nishinotōin Tokiyoshi mentions that a person named Sorori gave amusing lectures and did a comical impression of Chinese person.

== See also ==
- Hechikan
