= Morning (magazine) =

Japanese manga magazine

- Cover of the May 2014 issue of Weekly Morning featuring Cooking Papa, published by Kodansha on May 15, 2014
- Editor-in-Chief: Yasuyuki Mimura
- Former editors: Yoshiyuki Kurihara; Kohei Furukawa; Toshihiro Miura
- Categories: Seinen manga
- Frequency: Biweekly (1982–1986); Weekly (1986–present)
- Circulation: 63,908; (July–September 2026)
- First issue: August 1982
- Company: Kodansha
- Country: Japan
- Based in: Tokyo
- Language: Japanese
- Website: morning.kodansha.co.jp

Morning (Japanese: モーニング, Hepburn: Mōningu) is a weekly Japanese seinen manga magazine published by Kodansha, with new issues released every Thursday. It debuted in August 1982 as Comic Morning (コミックモーニング, Komikku Mōningu), with the cover date of September 9, 1982. Originally published biweekly, it moved to a weekly publication in April 1986. The magazine later rebranded as Morning in November 1991, while still maintaining its weekly publication tradition. Manga titles serialized in the magazine are published in tankōbon volumes under the "Morning KC" label. Many series contain topics aimed at adult, often middle-aged readers, such as food, sports, comedies, and workplace dramas. Nevertheless, Morning maintains a greater diversity of stories and art styles compared to other magazines.

Morning has had a number of special issues and sister magazines, including Monthly Afternoon in 1986, and Evening in 2001. The digital edition of the magazine, titled Weekly D Morning (週刊Dモーニング, Shūkan D Mōningu), was launched for mobile devices in May 2013. A spin-off magazine titled Monthly Morning Two (月刊モーニングtwo, Gekkan Mōningu Two) was launched (formerly bimonthly) in 2006, featuring stories like Saint Young Men, under the supervision of editor-in-chief Eijiro Shimada, who was simultaneously deputy editor-in-chief of Morning. Morning Two switched exclusively to digital release in August 2022, and publishes weekly every Thursday.

== Currently running manga series ==
Title	Author / Artist	Premiered
Catch Me at the Ballpark!	Tatsurō Suga	2020
Cooking Papa	Tochi Ueyama	1985
Danmitsu	Tooru Seino	2024
Dekin no Mogura	Natsumi Eguchi	2021
Giant Killing	Masaya Tsunamoto	2007
Gurazeni: Dai League-hen	Yūji Moritaka (story) and Keiji Adachi (art)	2021
Kosaku Shima	Kenshi Hirokane	1983
Last Samurai Standing	Shogo Imamura (story) and Katsumi Tatsuzawa (art)	2022
Longing for Home	Yoshihiro Yamada	2019
The Long Summer of August 31st	Ikkado Ito	2023
Nighthawk, Once Again	Fuyuki Izumida	2025
Nikaidō Jigoku Golf	Nobuyuki Fukumoto	2023
OL Shinkaron	Risu Akizuki	1989
Police in a Pod	Miko Yasu	2017
Shimazaki in the Land of Peace	Gōden Hamada (story) and Takeshi Seshimo (art)	2022
Shōwa no Gurazeni	Kawa	2021
Solo Camping for Two	Yudai Debata	2023
Toripan	Torino Nanko	2005
Totonō Oto: Mō Hitotsu no Piano no Mori	Makoto Isshiki	2024
What Did You Eat Yesterday?	Fumi Yoshinaga	2007

== Past serializations ==
=== 1980s ===
- Chōjin Haruko by George Akiyama (1982–1984)
- Okashina Futari by Jūzō Yamasaki (story) and Kei Sadayasu (art) (1982–1987)
- Otokotachi by Tetsuya Chiba (1982–1983)
- Suspicion by Osamu Tezuka (1982)
- A Shimmering Pale Color by Murasaki Yamada (1983–1984)
- Gekiteki Jūnishi Kō by Takao Yaguchi (1983–1984)
- Heart Cocktail by Seizō Watase (1983–1990)
- Be Free! by Tatsuya Egawa (1984–1988)
- What's Michael? by Makoto Kobayashi (1984–1989)
- Bem Hunter Sword by Yukinobu Hoshino (1986–1990)
- Dai-Tōkyō Binbō Seikatsu Manual by Tsukasa Maekawa (1986–1989)
- Fūko no Iru Mise by Hitoshi Iwaaki (1986–1988)
- Tsuyoshi Shikkari Shinasai by Kiyoshi Nagamatsu (1986–1990)
- Spirit of Wonder by Kenji Tsuruta (1986–1988, also serialized in Monthly Afternoon)
- You're Under Arrest by Kōsuke Fujishima (1986–1989, also serialized in Morning Party Zōkan)
- Chikyū Hyōkai Jiki by Jiro Taniguchi (1988–1991, moved from Monthly Afternoon)
- Tensai Yanagisawa Kyōju no Seikatsu by Kazumi Yamashita (1988–2013, on hiatus)
- Natsuko no Sake by Akira Oze (1988–1991)
- The Silent Service by Kaiji Kawaguchi (1988–1996)

=== 1990s ===
- Aah! Harimanada by Kei Sadayasu (1990–1996, moved from Morning Open Zōkan)
- Golden Lucky by Shunji Enomoto (1990–1996)
- Hyaku Hachi no Koi by Jun Hatanaka (1990–1991)
- Miyamoto kara Kimi e by Hideki Arai (1990–1994)
- Naniwa Kin'yūdō by Yūji Aoki (1990–1996)
- Heroes of the East Chou Dynasty by Chen Uen (1990–1993)
- Boku no Mura no Hanashi by Akira Oze (1991–1993)
- Gon by Masashi Tanaka (1991–2002)
- Reggie by Guy Jeans (story) and Minoru Hiramatsu (art) (1991–1994)
- Obake by Jun Hatanaka (1992)
- Tetsujin Ganma by Yasuhito Yamamoto (1992–1995)
- Aa! Yūtenji-ke by Yū Azuki (1993–1994, moved from Monthly Afternoon)
- Kono Hito ni Kakeru! by Ryōka Shū (story) and Kazuko Yumeno (art) (1993–1997)
- L'Autoroute du soleil by Baru (1994)
- Nonchan Noriben by Kiwa Irie (1994–1997)
- Sōten Kōro by Hagin Yi (story) and King Gonta (art) (1994–2005)
- Uni by Hwang Mina (1994)
- Power Office Girls by Hiroyuki Yasuda (1996–1997)
- Icaro by Moebius (story) and Jiro Taniguchi (art) (1997)
- Devil Lady by Go Nagai (1997–2000)
- Enomoto: New Elements that Shake the World by Shunji Enomoto (1997–2003)
- Kurogane by Kei Toume (1997–2003, moved from Morning Open Zōkan)
- The First King by Chen Uen (1998–1999)
- Vagabond by Takehiko Inoue (1998–2015, on hiatus)
- Kabachitare! by Tajima Takashi (story) and Kochi Takahiro (art) (1999–2021)
- Planetes by Makoto Yukimura (1999–2004)
- Tokyo Broker by Michiharu Kusunoki (1999–2003)

=== 2000s ===
- Shin Yakyū-kyō no Uta by Shinji Mizushima (2000–2005)
- Zipang by Kaiji Kawaguchi (2000–2009)
- Tsuyoshi Shikkari² Shinasai by Kiyoshi Nagamatsu (2001–2002)
- ES (Eternal Sabbath) by Fuyumi Soryo (2001–2004)
- Sharaku by Go Nagai (2001–2002)
- Shibao by Tsubasa Nunoura (2001)
- Maiwai by Minetarō Mochizuki (2002–2008)
- Say Hello to Black Jack by Shūhō Satō (2002–2006)
- Dragon Zakura by Norifusa Mita (2003–2007)
- Chi's Sweet Home by Konami Kanata (2004–2015)
- Drops of God by Shin Kibayashi (2004–2014)
- Forest of Piano by Makoto Isshiki (2004–2015, moved from Young Magazine Uppers)
- Haruka Seventeen by Sayuka Yamazaki (2004–2006)
- Hataraki Man by Moyoco Anno (2004–2008, on hiatus)
- Hatsukanezumi no Jikan by Kei Toume (2004, transferred to Monthly Afternoon)
- Cesare by Fuyumi Soryo (2005–2021)
- Hyouge Mono by Yoshihiro Yamada (2005–2017)
- Hotel by Boichi (2006)
- Rice Shoulder by Tsuyoshi Nakaima (2007–2013)
- The Black Museum by Kazuhiro Fujita (2007)
- Inanna by Reiko Okano (2007–2010)
- Present by Boichi (2007)
- Angel Bank: Dragon Zakura Gaiden by Norifusa Mita (2007–2010)
- Gregory Horror Show: Another World by Suzuki Sanami (2007–2008)
- Space Brothers by Chūya Koyama (2007–2026)
- Poten Seikatsu by Kinoshita Shinya (2008–2012)
- Billy Bat by Naoki Urasawa (story, art) and Takashi Nagasaki (story) (2008–2016)
- Tōkyō Kaidō by Minetarō Mochizuki (2008–2010)
- Shinshirakawa Genjin: Asode Kurasu Kyūkyoku DIY Seikatsu by Morimura Shin (2009–2011)
- Karechi by Kunihiko Ikeda (2009–2013)
- Kita no Lion by Seizō Watase (2009–2013)
- Neko Darake by Kimuchi Yokoyama (2009–2017)
- Livingstone by Tomohiro Maekawa (story) and Jinsei Kataoka (art) (2009–2015)

=== 2010s ===
- Gurazeni by Yūji Moritaka (story) and Keiji Adachi (art) (2010–2014)
- Omo ni Naeitemasu by Akiko Higashimura (2010–2012)
- ReMember by King Gonta (2010–2012)
- U by Roswell Hosoki (2010–2013)
- Furari by Jiro Taniguchi (2011)
- Déra Cinema by Yasushi Hoshino (2011–2012)
- Hirake Koma! by Minami Q-ta (2011–2013)
- Hozuki's Coolheadedness by Natsumi Eguchi (2011–2020)
- Kounodori: Dr. Stork by Yū Suzunoki (2012–2020)
- Mitarai – Tantei Mitarai Kiyoshi no Jiken Kiroku by Soji Shimada (story) and Tenka Hara (art) (2012–2014)
- Kabachi!!! Kabachitare! 3 by Tajima Takashi (story) and Kochi Takahiro (art) (2013–2021)
- Ichi-F by Kazuto Tatsuda (2013–2015)
- Investor Z by Norifusa Mita (2013–2017)
- Complex Age by Yui Sakuma (2014–2015)
- Land by Kazumi Yamashita (2014–2020)
- Marie Antoinette by Fuyumi Soryo (2015–2016)
- Drops of God: Mariage by Tadashi Agi (story) and Shu Okimoto (art) (2015–2020)
- Sono 'Okodawari', Ore ni mo Kure yo! by Tōru Seino (2015–2018, moved from Morning Two)
- My Journey to Her by Yuna Hirasawa (2016)
- Thunderbolt Fantasy by Gen Urobuchi (story) and Yui Sakuma (art) (2016–2017)
- Crocodile Baron by Takuya Okada (2016–2018)
- Madowanai Hoshi by Masayuki Ishikawa (2016–2024, moved from Morning Two)
- City by Keiichi Arawi (2016–2025)
- Setsuyaku Rock by Hiromi Okubo (2016–2017)
- Ship of Theseus by Toshiya Higashimoto (2017–2019)
- Khan: Kusa to Tetsu to Hitsuji by Takeshi Seshimo (2017–2020)
- Dragon Zakura 2 by Norifusa Mita (2018–2021)
- Cells at Work! Code Black by Shigemitsu Harada (story) and Issei Hatsuyoshi (art) (2018–2021)
- Isle of Dogs by Minetarō Mochizuki (2018)
- I Have a Crush at Work by Akamaru Enomoto (2019–2023)
- Sweat and Soap by Kintetsu Yamada (2019–2021, moved from D Morning)
- Funsō deshitara Hatta made by Motohiro Den (2019–2021, transferred to D Morning)

=== 2020s ===
- Liaison: Kodomo no Kokoro Shinryōjo by Yūsaku Takemura (story) and Yonchan (art) (2020–2025)
- Zange Meshi by Hatsumi Kodama (2020–2021, also serialized in Comic Days)
- How to Grill Our Love by Shiori Hanatsuka (2020–2026)
- Unmet: A Neurosurgeon's Diary by Yuzuru Kojika (story) and Kanto Ōtsuki (art) (2020–2024)
- Jōkyō Seikatsuroku Ichijō by Tensei Hagiwara (story), Tomoki Miyoshi and Yoshiaki Seto (art) (2021–2023)
- The World Is Dancing by Kazuto Mihara (2021–2022)
- Home Office Romance by Kintetsu Yamada (2022–2023)
- Matagi Gunner by Shōji Fujimoto (story) and Juan Albarran (art) (2022–2025)

== Circulation ==
Year / Period	Weekly circulation	Magazine sales (est.)
1986 to 1987	700,000	72,800,000
1988	900,000	46,800,000
1989	900,000	46,800,000
1990	1,000,000	52,000,000
1991	1,200,000	62,400,000
1992	1,170,000	60,840,000
1993	1,000,000	52,000,000
1994	910,000	47,320,000
1995	800,000	41,600,000
1996	720,000	37,440,000
1997	660,000	34,320,000
1998	650,000	33,800,000
1999	700,000	36,400,000
2000	700,000	36,400,000
2001	730,000	37,960,000
2002	700,000	36,400,000
2003	660,000	34,320,000
September 2003 to August 2004	584,167	30,376,684
September 2004 to August 2005	462,979	24,074,908
September 2005 to August 2006	437,232	22,736,064
September 2006 to August 2007	413,300	21,491,600
October 2007 to September 2008	395,722	20,577,544
October 2008 to September 2009	364,398	18,948,696
October 2009 to September 2010	340,209	17,690,868
October 2010 to September 2011	323,173	16,804,996
October 2011 to September 2012	307,771	16,004,092
October 2012 to September 2013	296,967	15,442,284
October 2013 to September 2014	280,742	14,598,584
October 2014 to September 2015	259,705	13,504,660
October 2015 to September 2016	232,804	12,105,808
October 2016 to September 2017	209,800	10,909,600
October 2017 to September 2018	190,130	9,886,760
October 2018 to September 2019	169,833	8,831,316
October 2019 to September 2020	154,195	8,018,140
October 2020 to September 2021	140,028	7,281,456
October 2021 to September 2022	116,313	6,048,276
October 2022 to September 2023	92,669	4,818,788
October 2023 to September 2024	78,704	4,092,608
October 2024 to September 2025	70,888	3,686,176
1986 to September 2025	425,565	1,077,529,908
