= Khan: Kusa to Tetsu to Hitsuji =

Japanese manga series

- First tankōbon volume cover

ハーン－草と鉄と羊－
- Genre: Adventure; Historical
- Manga
- Written by: Takeshi Seshimo
- Published by: Kodansha
- Imprint: Morning KC
- Magazine: Morning
- Original run: December 14, 2017 – February 20, 2020
- Volumes: 12
- icon

Khan: Kusa to Tetsu to Hitsuji (Japanese: ハーン－草と鉄と羊－; lit. 'Khan: Grass, Iron and Sheep') is a Japanese manga series written and illustrated by Takeshi Seshimo. It was serialized in Kodansha's seinen manga magazine Morning from December 2017 to February 2020, with its chapters collected in twelve tankōbon volumes.

== Publication ==
Written and illustrated by Takeshi Seshimo, Khan: Kusa to Tetsu to Hitsuji was serialized in Kodansha's seinen manga magazine Morning from December 14, 2017, (Note: It started in the magazine's combined issue 2/3 of 2018 (cover date January 11), which was released on December 14, 2017.) to February 20, 2020. (Note: It ended in the magazine's combined issue 3/5 of 2020 (cover date), which was released on February 20.) Kodansha collected its chapters in twelve tankōbon volumes, released from April 23, 2018, to April 23, 2020.

=== Volumes ===
No.	Release date	ISBN
1	April 23, 2018	978-4-06-511289-2
2	June 22, 2018	978-4-06-511713-2
3	August 23, 2018	978-4-06-512539-7
4	October 23, 2018	978-4-06-513537-2
5	December 21, 2018	978-4-06-513923-3
6	March 22, 2019	978-4-06-514957-7
7	May 23, 2019	978-4-06-515479-3
8	July 23, 2019	978-4-06-516514-0
9	September 20, 2019	978-4-06-517642-9
10	November 21, 2019	978-4-06-517760-0
11	January 23, 2020	978-4-06-518249-9
12	April 23, 2020	978-4-06-519208-5

== See also ==
- Shimazaki in the Land of Peace, another manga series by the same author
