= Nighthawk, Once Again =

Japanese manga series

- First tankōbon volume cover, featuring Aoi Yotaka

夜鷹ふたたび (Yotaka Futatabi)
- Genre: Action, comedy
- Manga
- Written by: Fuyuki Izumida
- Published by: Kodansha
- English publisher: NA: Seven Seas Entertainment
- Imprint: Morning KC
- Magazine: Morning
- Original run: November 13, 2025 – present
- Volumes: 3
- icon

Nighthawk, Once Again (Japanese: 夜鷹ふたたび, Hepburn: Yotaka Futatabi; lit. 'Nighthawk Returns') is a Japanese manga series written and illustrated by Fuyuki Izumida. It began serialization in Kodansha's Morning magazine in November 2025, and has been compiled into two volumes as of June 2026. It has been licensed in North America for English release by Seven Seas Entertainment.

== Plot ==
Aoi Yotaka was once a skilled hitman, nicknamed "Nighthawk", infamous for wiping out a notorious crime family. After assassinating a company president and multiple others, she suddenly retired. Now 33-years-old, she lives out her life as an alcoholic NEET, chain smoking and living alone in a dilapidated apartment. One day, a former associate arrives at her apartment, offering her work as he knows about her current situation. However, she declines, wanting to leave her life of crime behind. When her landlord soon warns her that she will be evicted if she is unable to pay her rent, she reluctantly agrees to become a hitman once again.

== Characters ==
Aoi Yotaka (夜鷹 葵, Yotaka Aoi)
A 33-year-old NEET who lives alone. Eight years prior, she assassinated the head of a team agency and several others, an incident that became known as "The Last Hunt", after which she disappeared. In the years since, she spent all her money on gambling and alcohol, making her unable to keep up with her apartment's rent. Despite not having been a hitman in years, she remains skilled in killing, even being able to stop her ex-associate when he tried attacking her after she declined his offer.

== Development ==
Nighthawk, Once Again is Fuyuki Izumida's third serialization, following his previous manga Black Board (2017) and Madara Rumble (2024). Having been inspired by his fandom of series such as Fullmetal Alchemist and Bleach, he wanted his works to feature cool action stories with female protagonists. For Nighthawk, Once Again, he wanted to create a manga that contrasted with his previous series, which were more typical in featuring mainstream tropes and fantasy. He initially discussed with his editor regarding ideas about the protagonist during a drinking party, with his eventually coming up with a sloppy protagonist in her 30s to make the character seem more realistic. Yotaka being 33 years old was partly inspired by how Izumida was himself in his mid-30s. He found the idea of contrasting Yotaka's beauty with his messy room romantic, finding it interesting that a woman's public image could differ from her private one. Yotaka's design, particularly her appearance while wearing a tank top, was partly inspired by the actress Yōko Maki.

== Publication ==
Written and illustrated by Fuyuki Izumida, Nighthawk, Once Again began serialization in Kodansha's Morning magazine on November 13, 2025. The first tankōbon volume was released on March 23, 2026; three volumes have been released as of September 18, 2026.

In October 2026, Seven Seas Entertainment announced that they had licensed the manga for English release in North America, with the first volume to release in October 2027.

=== Volumes ===
No.	Release date	ISBN
1	March 23, 2026	978-4-06-542253-3
2	June 23, 2026	978-4-06-543657-8
3	September 18, 2026	978-4-06-544986-8
