= Gurazeni =

Japanese baseball manga series

- Gurazeni: Money Pitch
- First tankōbon volume cover, featuring Natsunosuke Bonda

グラゼニ (Gurazeni)
- Genre: Sports
- Manga
- Written by: Yūji Moritaka
- Illustrated by: Keiji Adachi
- Published by: Kodansha
- Imprint: Morning KC
- Magazine: Morning
- Original run: December 9, 2010 – August 28, 2014
- Volumes: 17
Further information
Manga
Gurazeni: Tokyo Dome-hen
Written by	Yūji Moritaka
Illustrated by	Keiji Adachi
Published by	Kodansha
Imprint	Morning KC
Magazine	Morning
Original run	September 25, 2014 – February 15, 2018
Volumes	14
Manga
Gurazeni: Pa League-hen
Written by	Yūji Moritaka
Illustrated by	Keiji Adachi
Published by	Kodansha
Imprint	Morning KC
Magazine	Morning
Original run	March 29, 2018 – August 19, 2021
Volumes	13
Anime television series
Directed by	Ayumu Watanabe
Produced by	Atsushi Nagauchi; Yoshihiko Yamazaki
Written by	Hideo Takayashiki
Music by	Akifumi Tada
Studio	Studio Deen
Original network	SkyPer!
English network	SEA: Animax Asia
Original run	April 6, 2018 – December 21, 2018
Episodes	24
Manga
Gurazeni: Natsunosuke no Seishun
Written by	Yūji Moritaka
Illustrated by	Yōsuke Uzumaki
Published by	Kodansha
Imprint	Evening KC
Magazine	Evening
Original run	March 10, 2020 – November 8, 2022
Volumes	6
Manga
Shōwa no Gurazeni
Written by	Kawa
Published by	Kodansha
Imprint	Morning KC
Magazine	Morning
Original run	October 7, 2021 – present
Volumes	9
Manga
Gurazeni: Dai League-hen
Written by	Yūji Moritaka
Illustrated by	Keiji Adachi
Published by	Kodansha
Imprint	Morning KC
Magazine	Morning
Original run	December 9, 2021 – present
Volumes	9
- icon

Gurazeni: Money Pitch (Japanese: グラゼニ, Hepburn: Gurazeni (Note: 'Gurazeni' is a portmanteau of guraundo (グラウンド; lit. 'ground') and zeni (ゼニ; lit. 'money'); the full phrase was coined by former Pacific League MVP and national championship-winning coach Kazuto Tsuruoka (1916–2000): "Guraundo ni wa zeni ga ochite iru" (グラウンドにはゼニが落ちている), which translates as: "There is money to be made on the field".)) is a Japanese baseball manga series written by Yūji Moritaka and illustrated by Keiji Adachi. The manga was serialized in Kodansha's seinen manga magazine Morning from December 2010 to August 2014, with its chapters collected in fourteen tankōbon volumes. Three sequels have been released since then; Gurazeni: Tokyo Dome-hen (2014–2018); Gurazeni: Pa League-hen (2018–2021); and Gurazeni: Dai League-hen (since 2021).

The series follows the unforgiving money-and-statistics-centric world of professional baseball, in a similar concept to Moneyball, but through the eyes of players: a relief pitcher and left-handed specialist, Bonda Natsunosuke, and Tokunaga, a retired pitcher turned color commentator. The fictional teams in the series are based on real teams in the NPB, particularly the Central League.

A 24-episodes anime television series adaptation by Studio Deen was broadcast from April to December 2018.

== Characters ==
Natsunosuke Bonda (凡田 夏之介, Bonda Natsunosuke)
Voiced by: Fukushi Ochiai (Note: Fukushi is the son of former professional baseball player and manager Hiromitsu Ochiai)
A 26-year-old professional baseball player for the Jingū Spiders. Born in Yamanashi, he was recruited 8 years ago and was Mr. Irrelevant in his draft class that received only 15 million yen (US$137,000) as a signing bonus. Left-handed short middle relief pitcher and left-handed specialist. He earns 18 million yen (US$160,000) per year, which is above average for his role due to games played per season, yet it is well below average for players his age. Obsessively reads player's directories and has become very knowledgeable about other players contracts and annual salaries. He is very worried he won't be able to earn enough money during his baseball career so he can retire comfortably. It got to the point that in a radio interview, where he was inebriated, he blurted out his jealousy over the Osaka Tempters and Mops middle relief pitchers, who not only earn more than him, but also made twice the appearance each, exposing his inferiority complex.
Tokunaga (徳永)
Voiced by: Daisuke Namikawa
Usually called Toku (トク); he is a 35-year-old radio color commentator. Originally from Yamanashi like Bonda. He was a starter for the Spiders for 10 years before retiring from baseball 3 years previously. He had less than 50 wins and his highest salary was 30 million yen per year (US$274,000). He got his current job through his connections with director of Otowa radio but often offers nothing of substance as a commentator. Bonda believes that due to his extravagant life style he ended his career broke and is making little money in his current job. Despite being more diligent on his research due to him using a computer, as opposed to Hideo Matsumoto's fully manual system, which helped the radio station getting inside scoop on newly promoted players, he was fired in season 2, just as he and his fiancée are travelling to Guam.
Akira Shibuya (渋谷 章, Shibuya Akira)
Voiced by: Takanori Hoshino
Spider's no.2 starting pitcher. 26 years old, from the same draft class and area as Bonda, but earns 36 million yen, has 21 wins in 7 years as a pro. Bonda's best friend and they frequently go out for drinks together. In the current season of baseball he has been a starter in 3 games, with only 1.00 ERA, but lost all 1-0.
Yukio Ohno (大野 雪雄, Ōno Yukio)
Voiced by: Yusuke Shirai
Left-handed Left outfielder for the Spiders, from Yamanashi like Bonda. He wears jersey no.3, traditionally given to the team's best hitter. He is dealing with a batting slump. He was first to hit Bonda's pitch for a home-run in a high school tournament. Earns 20 million per year.
Tanabe (田辺)
Voiced by: Issei Futamata
Manager of Jingu Spiders. Has a lot of trust in Bonda as a reliever.
Sakota (迫田)
Voiced by: Kenji Nomura
The Spiders bullpen coach. A stoic bearded man who has a good understanding of Bonda's strengths and weaknesses.
Yuki (ユキちゃん, Yuki-chan)
Voiced by: Mao Ichimichi
Japanese canteen waitress, very optimistic and bubbly and popular among men. From Osaka, a huge fan of Osaka Tempters, while she hated Bonda in the game, she had no recollection of him as a player when he was a customer. Her opinion of him changed when she attended a fan meeting session in the playoffs.
Yasuda (安田)
Voiced by: Masuo Amada
Bonda's scout. He advised Bonda to not spend the money he got as a signing bonus but use it as an insurance if he's injured or is dropped from the team.
Hideo Matsumoto
Voiced by himself. The only factual character in the anime, a baseball announcer for Otowa Radio Station. In season 2, it is revealed that he still uses a fully manual system to write notes rather than using a computer. However, due to the extensive research needed to cover back-to-back games live, he often works long hours and little sleep.
Segawa (瀬川)
Voiced by: Yūki Hayashi
29-year-old right-handed closer for the Spiders. He was scouted from an amateur team and earned the closer spot last year receiving a 50 million yen contract. He robbed a win from Shibuya, but injured himself after blowing a save a month later. After he recovered, he blew one more save costing Shibuya another win and was sent to the minors.
Roppa Itsuki (樹 六破, Itsuki Roppa)
Voiced by: Wataru Takagi
A portly family man. He is a player in the Spiders' Minor League team who bats left but throws right. He is the same age as Bonda and was recruited out of college 4 years previously. He's been brought up to the majors after a successful streak in the minors but Bonda thinks he isn't cut out to be in the pros. Yet, he was instrumental in helping Spider win the divisional pennant after two hot streaks, all despite his wife giving birth to a son by emergency cesarean due to breech birth.

== Media ==
=== Manga ===
Written by Yūji Moritaka and illustrated by Keiji Adachi, Gurazeni was serialized in Kodansha's seinen manga magazine Morning magazine from December 9, 2010, to August 28, 2014. Kodansha collected its chapters in seventeen tankōbon volumes, released from May 23, 2011, to January 23, 2015.

A second series, titled Gurazeni: Tokyo Dome-hen (グラゼニ 〜東京ドーム編〜), was serialized in Morning from September 25, 2014, to February 15, 2018. Kodansha collected its chapters in fifteen tankōbon volumes, released from January 23, 2015, to May 23, 2018.

A third series, titled Gurazeni: Pa League-hen (グラゼニ 〜パ・リーグ編〜), was serialized in Morning from March 29, 2018, to August 19, 2021. Kodansha collected its chapters in thirteen tankōbon volumes, released from June 22, 2018, to October 21, 2021.

A fourth series, titled Gurazeni: Dai League-hen (グラゼニ～大リーグ編～), started in Morning on December 9, 2021. The series finished its first part on February 17, 2022; the second part started on May 19 of the same year. The first tankōbon volume was released on April 21, 2022. As of March 23, 2026, nine volumes have been released.

==== Spin-offs ====
A spin-off manga, titled Gurazeni: Natsunosuke no Seishun (グラゼニ 〜夏之介の青春〜), written by Yūji Moritaka and illustrated by Yōsuke Uzumaki, was serialized in Kodansha's Evening from March 10, 2020, to November 8, 2022. Kodansha collected its chapters in six tankōbon volumes, released from July 20, 2020, to February 21, 2023.

Another spin-off by Kawa, titled Shōwa no Gurazeni (昭和のグラゼニ), serialized its first part in Morning from October 7 to December 2, 2021. Nine more parts have been serialized since then; the second one from March 3 to April 28, 2022; the third one from August 4 to October 13, 2022; the fourth one from February 2 to April 6, 2023; the fifth one from July 13 to September 21, 2023; (Note: Serialized until the magazine's 43rd issue of 2023, released on September 21 of that same year.) the sixth one from December 28, 2023, to March 14, 2024; (Note: Serialized from the combined 4th and 5th issue to the 15th issue of 2024, released on December 28, 2023, and March 14, 2024, respectively.) the seventh one from July 11 to September 19, 2024; the eighth one from January 16 to April 3, 2025; (Note: Serialized until the magazine's 18th issue of 2025, released on April 3 of that same year.) the ninth one from July 17 to October 2, 2025; (Note: Serialized until the magazine's 44th issue of 2025, released on April 3 of that same year.) the tenth one from February 5 to April 30, 2026; an eleventh part is set to start in Q4 2026. The first tankōbon volume was released on April 21, 2022. As of November 21, 2025, nine volumes have been released.

=== Anime ===
An anime television series aired from April 6 to June 22, 2018, on SKY PerfecTV!'s SkyPer! channel. Produced by SKY Perfect JSAT, Kodansha and Studio Deen, the series is directed by Ayumu Watanabe, with Hideo Takayashiki handling series composition and writing the scripts, Kenichi Ohnuki designing the characters and Akifumi Tada composing the music. The anime's theme song is "Merigo feat. SKY-HI" by Cypress Ueno to Robert Yoshino. The closing song is "Shadow Monster" performed by Asako Toki. Well known actor and film director 'Beat' Takeshi appeared as a guest star in the final episode of the first season. A second season aired from October 5 to December 21, 2018, which included baseball player Masahiro Yamamoto and comedian Yuki Iwai in cameo roles.

==== Episodes ====
No.	Title (Note: English episode titles are taken from Crunchyroll)	Directed by	Original release date
1	"My Workplace / Spot Starter"; Transliteration: "Boku no Shokuba / Tanima" (Japanese: 僕の職場 / 谷間)	Shunji Yoshida	April 6, 2018
The Spiders are playing the Osaka Tempters. Bonda Natsunosuke is brought in but he has to pitch to a right-handed batter. The batter failed and was ruled out and later demoted to the Minor Leagues. Bonda considers it a statement on his own lack of worth. Tokunaga invites Bonda out for a drink. He is worried about his ratings and tries to get Bonda to tell him who will be the starter in The Spiders' next game. At the day of the game he is very relieved that Bonda is the starter because he knows everything about him.
2	"Tendency / Buddies"; Transliteration: "Shūsei / Dachi" (Japanese: 習性 / 友達)	Naoki Murata	April 13, 2018
Sakota, the Spiders bullpen coach, observes that Bonda regularly retires hitters who have lower salary than he has and players who make more than 100 million yen but gives up hits up to batters with salary in the range between those amounts. Sakota wonders what will happen when Bonda pitches against a player with exactly the same salary. Bonda's friend and team-mate Shibuya Akira, who makes twice what Bonda makes in a year, is frustrated because all his starts this season have resulted in a loss.
3	"Prefecture Clique"; Transliteration: "Kenjinkai" (Japanese: 県人会)	Hiromichi Matano	April 20, 2018
Ōno Yukio wears jersey no.3, traditionally given to the team's best hitter, but recently he has been in a slump. Ōno, Bonda and Toku who all come from Yamanashi Prefecture go out for drink together. Toku warns Ōno he has to get his batting average over.300 or 4 home runs in next 4 games because his defense is weak. He also tells Bonda he has to get his earned run average below 3. When Segawa, the Spiders' closer, is injured, Bonda gets his chance.
4	"Railroad to Retirement / The Man Who Couldn't Go Pro"; Transliteration: "Intai e no Rēru / Puro ni Narenakatta Otoko" (Japanese: 引退へのレール / プロになれなかった男)	Shunji Yoshida	April 27, 2018
The Spiders are playing The Carnavits. Bonda is pitching against Doteirai, a 41-year-old champion with 500 home runs in his career. Bonda is nervous because he broke Doteirai's wrist the previous season. Some members of the Carnavits' management are hoping Doteirai fails to get a hit so they'll have an excuse to retire him. On the ballgrounds of Jingu Park, amateur baseball players observe Bonda and a young man playing holding a soccer ball in the air. They are impressed by their fast reflexes.
5	"Safe Bets, Risky Bets"; Transliteration: "Anzen na Kabu Kiken na Kabu" (Japanese: 安全な株・危険な株)	Hidehiko Kadota	May 4, 2018
Bonda is introduced to Makiba, a manga artist who intends to write a baseball manga. Later, when the two meet again, Makiba explains he never went ahead with the manga because he thought it was too risky instead he created a spin-off of his previous manga. Bonda observes that the worlds of manga publishing and professional baseball are similar. The Spiders' closer Segawa gives up a home run and after injuries is dropped to the Minor Leagues. Toku is named as the fill-in closer.
6	"Multiplier"; Transliteration: "Baisū" (Japanese: 倍数)	Naoki Murata	May 11, 2018
Bonda and Shibuya start thinking their lifestyle is too modest and boring so they go out drinking in a hostess club in Ginza. There they meet Sekiya, 1st baseman for the Nagoya Wild Ones. Bonda is very much aware of Sekiya because his salary is 180 million yen a year or ten times what Bonda makes. The day after Bonda goes for a morning run and sees Sekiya exiting a taxi. It's obvious Sekiya has spent the entire night drinking and partying which shocks Bonda because their teams are playing each other later that evening.
7	"A Minor League Player in the Majors"; Transliteration: "Nigun nanoni Ichigun" (Japanese: 二軍なのに一軍)	Hiromichi Matano	May 18, 2018
When one of the Spiders' catchers is injured a catcher called Tōkō Junji is brought into the team from the Minors. When Bonda is pitching, Tōkō makes a series of mistakes almost costing the Spiders the game. After the game Bonda awkwardly overhears Tōkō getting told off by Kitamura, Tōkō's old teammate in college and now a successful sports reporter. Kitamura thinks Tōkō should retire and has offered him a job with his family business.
8	"The Commute to the Ballpark"; Transliteration: "Kyūjō made no Tsūkin Jijō" (Japanese: 球場までの通勤事情)	Fumio Maezono	May 25, 2018
It's reported that representatives from the Spiders have gone to the U.S. to acquire closer to replace Segawa. Bonda is visited by Thomas Hotpopper an American left-handed pitcher. He is worried if the Spiders hire a new foreigner he'll be let go because of the restrictions on the number of foreign players on the active roster, each team is allowed in the league. Thomas is a starter in the next game and, since the Game is in Yokohama, Bonda volunteers to escort him there by train. Thomas has to pitch against a lineup of all right-handers, starts struggling and loses control of his temper and is substituted for Bonda. Eventually, the Spiders talks in the U.S. didn't work out and it was decided to keep Segawa.
9	"Teacher or Cautionary Tale?"; Transliteration: "Kyōshi or Hanmen Kyōshi" (Japanese: 教師or反面教師)	Hiroyuki Tsuchiya	June 1, 2018
Kuriki Satoshi is a 30-year-old former pitcher and currently a batting practice pitcher and scorer for the Spiders. Bonda believes if Kuriki hadn't been so obsessed with ball speed his career could have gone a lot further. Kuriki approaches Bonda and wants to give him advice. Bonda has mixed feeling about this because Kuriki's advices haven't worked well for him in the past. Following Kuriki's lesson Bonda changes his pitching form, which gives him more speed, but Bonda worries about losing control of the ball.
10	"High School Recruit, College Recruit"; Transliteration: "Kōsotsu to Daisotsu" (Japanese: 高卒と大卒)	Hidehiko Kadota	June 8, 2018
5 years ago at the Summer Koshien Ishimoto and Ezure were the star players. Both were recruited by the Osaka Tempters, Ishimoto straight out of high school, but Ezure after going through college league. However neither of them managed to become regulars. The Tempters' manager wants to bring in a new pinch hitter and drop one of them to the minors. It's decided to give both of them a chance in the next game against The Spiders, and whoever performs better would be allowed to stay. During the game, Spiders' starting pitcher, Akiba plays badly and The Tempters rack up a big lead. Bonda is put on the mound and told to play four innings. Ishimoto and Ezure are in trouble because both of them have lower salary than Bonda.
11	"No Pitch to Throw"; Transliteration: "Nageru Tama ga Nai" (Japanese: 投げるタマがない)	Kazuomi Koga	June 15, 2018
The Spiders travel to Hiroshima to play the Setouchi Carnabeats. One of the Carnabeats' pitchers is Haratake Hiromi, a pro for 14 years and a local media celebrity. Haratake openly admits he's not a good athlete and claims he fakes his way through. Bonda wonders how he has managed to have such a long career. In the fifth inning of the game circumstances force both Haratake and Bonda to hit against each other.
12	"The Lonely Gourmet"; Transliteration: "Kodoku na Gurume" (Japanese: コドクなグルメ)	Shunji Yoshida	June 22, 2018
Yuki works as a waitress in a Japanese diner in Ebisu called Kitchen Ajihei. Bonda is a frequent customer and has a crush on her. A group of customers offer her tickets to the Jingu Stadium and she agrees if she can go see the Osaka Tempters because she is a Tempters fan. Next time the Spiders and the Tempters play, Bonda notices Yuki in the bleachers. When Bonda is pitching he accidentally injures two Tempters' players and then executes a flawless double play that ends the inning. When Bonda glances at the jeering spectators he sees Yuki glaring at him in fury. However next time when he goes to Kitchen Ajihei Yuki doesn't recognize him again.
13	"Back in the Majors"; Transliteration: "Ichigun Fukki" (Japanese: 一軍復帰)	Naoki Murata	October 5, 2018
The Spiders are playing an away game in Nagoya. When the scheduled starter comes down with a fever Bonda is rushed in as a substitute. In a rare chance to play as a starter Bonda becomes over-eager and breaks his right-hand wrist when trying to perform a double-tag-out by himself. This is the first major injury in Bonda's career. Four months later, Bonda has at last recovered from his injury and makes it back to the team, the Spiders are in the middle of a three-way pennant race with 30 games left until playoffs.
14	"The Softy"; Transliteration: "Ama-chan" (Japanese: 甘チャン)	Hidehiko Kadota	October 12, 2018
When Bonda returned from the minors Itsuki Roppa came with him. Bonda thinks that while Itsuki is a talented batter he doesn´t have the situational awareness or mindset to be a professional. Bonda gets his appearance after returning from his injuries in Itsuki's first game against the Mops. When Bonda pitches, an easy pop fly that Itsuki fails to catch, allows the Mops to score a run and eventually costs the Spiders the game. A downhearted Bonda returns to Kitchen Ajihei hoping that a glimpse of Yuki's face and her "fried chicken & rice" will cheer him up.
15	"Rising to First"; Transliteration: "Shui Fujō" (Japanese: 首位浮上)	Hiromichi Matano	October 19, 2018
In a vital game Itsuki hits an obvious 'ball', the hit is caught in the field and the game ends in a draw rather than a win for the Spiders. In another game Itsuki manages score several runs but it doesn´t matter because the Spiders are getting thrashed anyway. Itsuki tells Bonda that he knows he will be sent back to the minors but he wants to stay in the majors until his son is born. Bonda disagrees and says people should play baseball for the sake of their own ambition and not for their families. In the next few games Itsuki goes on a hitting streak and earns a role as a starter and keeps the Spiders in the race for the pennant.
16	"Celebrate! The League Pennant!"; Transliteration: "Shuku Rīgu Yūshō" (Japanese: 祝・リーグ優勝)	Toshihiro Maeya	October 26, 2018
Itsuki is on a hot streak and The Spiders are in first place in the race for the pennant. Itsuki has been staying at a hotel and thinks this helps his concentration but Bonda tells him to go home to his family. After that Itsuki starts to struggle but Bonda tells him it's because other teams have been studying him and making adjustments. The next game against the Tempters is decisive, if the Spiders win or draw they have clinched the pennant. As Bonda and Itsuki are going the stadium in a taxi Itsuki gets a phone call; his wife delivered a baby boy but there were some complications and the baby is in ICU. Bonda gives up a home run in the 8th inning but Itsuki saves him with a pinch home-run in the bottom of the ninth and the game ends in a draw. The spiders have won the pennant but in the celebrations Bonda has mixed feelings because of his previous blunder. Itsuki's baby is out of any danger and when Bonda visits Itsuki, at the hospital birth ward, Itsuki tells him the reason he managed a hit in the game was because he was so worried, that he didn´t pay any attention to the game and unlike the other players wasn´t stressed out. Bonda thanks him for saving him from becoming a scapegoat and the two hug each other in tears.
17	"Just Between Us"; Transliteration: "Koko dake no Ohanashi" (Japanese: ココだけのおハナシ)	Masahiko Watanabe	November 2, 2018
Bonda appears as a guest on a radio show. He is nervous so he gulps down some whiskey before the show. On air he starts saying things he shouldn't, like complaining about his salary and criticizing the rules of the Japan Series. This shocks the other panelist and enrages a player for the Osaka Tempters who had just won the Japan series. In the end Bonda tries to play the whole thing off as a joke.
18	"Lonely Season"; Transliteration: "Sabishii Kisetsu" (Japanese: さびしい季節)	Shunji Yoshida	November 9, 2018
During the off-season Bonda is in a workout group with three other pitchers. Soon two of those pitchers are released from the team with Bonda and the 27-year-old Korekawa remaining, and Korekawa suspects he's going to get the call soon. When the call comes Korekawa is however not being let go but instead being traded to the Kobe Oxen, his other hometown team. The two go out for a dinner to Yuki's diner where Yuki is engrossed in a Tempters game being shown on television. Korekawa manages to charm Yuki with his knowledge about the Koshien Stadium much to the chagrin of Bonda and the other customers. Afterwards, as they leave the restaurant, Korekawa says he will miss the Spiders as it was the team that started his career and implies that if Bonda is interested in Yuki he has to make a move before it's too late. Next season, however, due to lack of appearances, Korekawa retires.
19	"Designated for Assignment"; Transliteration: "Senryokugai Tsūkoku" (Japanese: 戦力外通告)	Hidehiko Kadota	November 16, 2018
Both Nishigo'uchi, a 38-year-old starter for the Sapporo Purple Shadows and the Spiders' Tōkō —previously seen in episode 7— have been "DFA'd" by their teams. Neither of them want to quit playing, Tōkō because he believes he still has the ability to play well and Nishigo'uchi for financial reasons (paying hefty taxes from last year's inflated salary). Both of them enter tryouts on the slim chance that some other teams will pick them up. Eventually no Japanese teams are interested but both of them get signed by a team in Taiwan.
20	"Fan Appreciation Day"; Transliteration: "Fan Kansha Dē" (Japanese: ファン感謝デー)	Masahiko Watanabe; Hiromichi Matano	November 23, 2018
When Yuki was at Jingu Stadium when Bonda beat Osaka Tempters (ep. 12), it was because 3 office workers, who are regulars in the canteen, took her out to watch the game. Yuki overheard that they want to take her out ice skating, which she accepted, as the skating rink is not far from Jingu Stadium. But the three men are way out of their depth since they cannot skate, whereas Yuki can because she has been skating since she was a kid. As they leave the rink, they followed the crowd to the Fan Appreciation Day hosted by Jingu Spiders. This was also the same place where Osaka Tempters won the Climax series. Spiders play in the Japan East vs. West Game based on birthplaces, as well as a hide-and-seek game. Bonda and Akira (East team) are dressed in Tutankhamen and Cleopatra costumes respectively, and they sat next to Yuki, but Shibuya manages to strike up a conversation with Yuki, whereas Bonda cannot, even when Yuki wanted to thank him for walking the Tempters during the Climax series that helped them win the series. Just when Bonda thought Akira was trying to flirt with her, he, in fact told Bonda how his decreasing performance would affect his earning power, meaning he can no longer go after women as he pleased.
21	"Marrying While Unemployed?!"; Transliteration: "Mushoku de Kekkon?!" (Japanese: 無職で結婚...!?)	Naoki Murata; Masahiko Watanabe	November 30, 2018
Bonda found out that Toku is engaged, but he has also been fired from his job, because the radio station re-signed a veteran color commentator, Jiro Jinno, for a second stint at the radio station to take over his job after spending the last decade as a coach and commentator in other stations, despite Toku being able to find inside scoops on players. Toku, in his engagement bliss, took his fiancée to Guam for a vacation, so he doesn't know that he has no job to return to until he returns from the vacation, instead of finalizing his contract extension for next baseball season.
22	"Sudden Turnaround!"; Transliteration: "Ikinari dai gyakuten!" (Japanese: いきなり大逆転!)	Masayuki Iimura	December 7, 2018
After Toku and Akemi return from Guam, they finally find out that Toku lost his job. Matsumoto manages to get him a job coaching an independent league baseball team in Fukui. Due to the long distance away from Tokyo，and a comparatively meagre 3.6 million-yen contract —still a significant pay raise compared to his salary at Otowa Radio— Toku worries that Akemi won't be willing to go with him. Akemi is not happy with the idea but sees this as an opportunity to leave her rather seedy work as a hostess in a club in Roppongi. Unbeknownst to them, Jinno's friend, Akihiko Kugutsu, was nominated as the new head coach of the Bunkyo Mops. However, the media start reporting that Kugutsu was once a spokesperson of a real estate company, where the executive turned out to have ties with mob syndicates and the Mops withdraw the offer to avoid controversy. Jinno becomes the new head coach of the Bunkyo Mops instead, clearing the way for Toku's reinstatement and contract extension with Otowa Radio.
23	"Contract Renewals, Part One"; Transliteration: "Keiyaku kōkai zenpen" (Japanese: 契約更改・前編)	Masahiko Watanabe	December 14, 2018
During the off season, every player's contracts and salaries are re-negotiated. Bonda feels confident, given that two of the starting pitchers, Shibuya and Ōno both got pay raises on their first negotiations with the club，with Bonda correctly predicting their new salaries. Kawasaki, a 39-year-old veteran pitcher, wants a multi-year contract so he can reach 200 wins but eventually agrees to a one-year 70 million Yen contract. The negotiations with Bonda himself, a relief pitcher who missed 4 months of the season, and had a decent but inconsistent season, is far less straightforward. As a consolation, Yuki finally recognizes him when he visits the canteen, after Bonda had an impromptu signing session when other regulars recognized him. Next day, Bonda was offered 25-million-Yen contract, as predicted, but he appeals to add an extra million.
24	"Contract Renewals, Part Two"; Transliteration: "Keiyaku kōkai kōhen" (Japanese: 契約更改・後編)	Shunji Yoshida	December 21, 2018
Bonda argues his case to gain a small, but significant extra million Yen to his contract, but the managers refuse to budge. Bonda brings up a game against The Mops at Jingu Stadium where his performance secured The Spiders' 4000th win and Kawasaki's 150th win but the managers counter that this has already been taken into account in their offer. Bonda then mentions that at this very game a famous singer and an actor were in the audience leading to the exposure of their relationship. This created a lot of media attention and the fact that the "star-couple" were Jingu Spiders-fans was frequently mentioned. At last, the management gives up and lets Bonda have a 26 million Yen annual contract. Afterwards Bonda is at first exultant but later starts to anguish over his behavior and worrying he might have pushed his luck too far.

== Reception ==
By October 2022 the overall series had over 3.5 million copies in circulation. The series was second on the 2012 edition of Takarajimasha's Kono Manga ga Sugoi! list of best manga for male readers. It nominated for the fifth Manga Taishō in 2012. It won the 37th Kodansha Manga Award in the general category in 2013.

Mike Toole of Anime News Network praised the anime adaptation, in particular the main character Bonda but acknowledged it was difficult to sell to most western viewers.
