= Second Hand Love (manga) =

Collection of manga by Murasaki Yamada

Second Hand Love is a collection of manga by Murasaki Yamada, (Note: The English edition writes the author's name in Japanese order, Yamada Murasaki.) published by Shogakukan. The collection was translated into English by Ryan Holmberg and published in North America in 2024 by Drawn and Quarterly.

The volume has two manga, both from the 1980s.

- A Blue Flame, known originally as A Shimmering Pale Color (ゆらりうす色 Yurari Usuiro), makes up the majority of the volume.
- Second Hand Love (Note: The comic is titled in Japanese with Latin characters)

The two manga were previously published together in Japanese by Shogakukan, under the collective title A Shimmering Pale Color.

== Plots ==
A Blue Flame is about Ichinose Emi, (Note: Ichinose is the surname, reflecting the official English translation of the manga.) a woman in an affair with a married man. Initially she continues the affair despite others telling her to stop, but she realizes that she feels disrespected by being in the affair.

Second Hand Love follows Yuko, who recalled how her father cheated on her mother and how this affects her own relationships with other men. At the time of the plot, Yuko's mother is dead, and Yuko's father wishes he had not cheated on her.

== Publication ==
A Shimmering Pale Color was first published in Comic Morning from 1983 to 1984, and was serialized in book form by Kodansha. In 1986 it was adapted into a film titled Bed In (ベッド・イン). The comic Second Hand Love was first published in Comic Baku, from 1986 to 1987.

A Shimmering Pale Color was later published by Shogakukan, in a volume, titled A Shimmering Pale Color, that also included the manga Second Hand Love.

The English version has an interview with Yamada that occurred in 1985. It also has images from A Loving Family (恋する家族), written by Masahiro Mita.

== Reception ==
Terry Hong of Booklist argued that, in 2024, the insights into women's issues "remains relevantly evergreen across cultures and decades."

Publishers Weekly gave a starred review and stated that the collection is "exquisite" and "a perfect introduction to Murasaki's heady feminist dramas."

== See also ==
- Women in Japan
- Feminism in Japan
- Talk to My Back, another manga by Yamada
