= My Journey to Her =

Japanese manga series

- Tankōbon volume cover

僕が私になるために (Boku ga Watashi ni Naru Tame ni)
- Genre: Autobiographical; Comedy; Slice of life
- Manga
- Written by: Yuna Hirasawa
- Published by: Kodansha
- English publisher: NA: Kodansha USA (digital)
- Magazine: Morning
- Original run: March 10, 2016 – April 21, 2016
- Volumes: 1
- icon

My Journey to Her (Japanese: 僕が私になるために, Hepburn: Boku ga Watashi ni Naru Tame ni; 'For Me to Become Me') is a Japanese autobiographical manga series written and illustrated by Yuna Hirasawa. It was serialized in Kodansha's seinen manga magazine Morning from March to April 2016, with its chapters collected in a single tankōbon volume.

== Plot ==
Yuna in the years after graduating finds herself drifting through an unfulfilling office job while feeling that something essential is missing from her life. Her path changes forever after receiving a diagnosis of gender dysphoria, which gives shape to the feelings she has long struggled to understand. As Yuna begins her gender transition, the story documents her experiences with medical treatment, experimenting with makeup and clothing, and confronting the emotional isolation, fear, and uncertainty that often accompany the process. The narrative reaches a turning point in 2015, when Yuna travels to Thailand for gender-affirming surgery. Supported by her siblings and compassionate strangers she meets along the way, she begins to heal both physically and emotionally.

== Publication ==
Written and illustrated by Yuna Hirasawa, My Journey to Her was serialized in Kodansha's seinen manga magazine Morning from March 10 to April 21, 2016. Kodansha collected its chapters in a single tankōbon volume, released on June 23, 2016.

Kodansha USA licensed the manga for English digital release, with the volume released on July 9, 2024.

== Reception ==
The manga won the Eisner Awards's Best Digital Comic category in 2025.
