= Murasaki Yamada =

Japanese manga artist and writer (1948–2009)

- Born: Mitsuko Yamada; September 5, 1948 Tokyo, Japan
- Died: May 5, 2009 (aged 60) Kyoto, Japan
- Areas: Manga artist, essayist, poet
- Spouses: One previous husband (separated 1981, divorced 1983); Chikao Shiratori

Murasaki Yamada (やまだ 紫, Yamada Murasaki; September 5, 1948 – May 5, 2009), born as Mitsuko Yamada (山田 三津子, Yamada Mitsuko), was a Japanese manga artist, feminist essayist and poet. She was associated with the alternative manga magazine Garo.

== Life ==
She was born in Taishidō, Setagaya, Tokyo as Mitsuko Yamada, on September 5, 1948. She began drawing artwork as a child. She lived with her grandparents while her mother and sister lived separately; they all lived in Taishidō. Her father died from tuberculosis. She attended Fujimigaoka High School, beginning in 1963, and played in a band, "Weeping Love Strings," with four men/boys. She married one of them in October 1971, and the two moved to a danchi apartment in Takashimadaira.

She used the pen name "Murasaki Neko" for her poetry work, and later incorporated "Murasaki" into her standard pen name. Ryan Holmberg, the translator of Talk to My Back, stated that the name "Murasaki" reminds one of Murasaki Shikibu and that the name had "poetic connotations" to the author's liking. Additionally, Yamada's daughter, Yū Yamada, stated that Yamada liked the color of purple dyes from lithospermum erythrorhizon, also known as "murasaki". Yamada had a preference for cats, which appears in her works.

She made her debut as a professional manga artist in 1969 in Osamu Tezuka's avantgarde magazine COM and had formal art training before becoming a manga artist. When COM stopped being published, she started working for Garo magazine instead. Her first short story in Garo was "Oh, the Ways of the World" (ああせけんさま Aa Seken-sama) in 1971. For another short story, "When the Wind Blew" (風の吹く頃 Kaze no fuku koro), she won an Honorable Mention at the Big Comic Award associated with the Big Comic magazine. After this, she put her career on hiatus because of marriage and raising her children. She returned to Garo in 1978 and also started publishing essays, illustrations and poetry in literary magazines. From 1981 until 1984, she published the feminist manga series Talk to My Back in Garo, which dealt with being a housewife, a failing marriage and the pressure of raising children.

She separated from her first husband in 1981, and he moved out of her residence. The divorce was complete in 1983. She accused her first husband of spousal abuse.

Yamada ran for a seat in the 1989 Japanese House of Councillors election as part of the Chikyū Club political organization. She lost, along with others in her party. It was the only time she ran for office.

From 2006 on, she taught at Kyoto Seika University's Faculty of Manga. In 2007, she also moved to Kyoto.

She married Chikao Shiratori, and was last legally known as Mitsuko Shiratori (白取 三津子, Shiratori Mitsuko). She first met Shiratori in 1984. He moved into her residence around 1985 to 1986. In 2002 they married. She was 17 years older than he was, and she modeled a boyfriend character in Blue Sky after him.

Yamada died at Kyoto Hospital on May 5, 2009, age 60, due to intracerebral hemorrhage.

== Style ==
Her works are described as being pictorial I Novels.

== Impact ==
Frederik L. Schodt regarded her work as particularly important because of the feminist message, rare in shōjo manga. Yamada influenced Hinako Sugiura and Yōko Kondō, her former assistants. The three of them were referred to as the "Three Garo Girls" (ガロ三人娘 Garo san'nin musume), translated by Ryan Holmberg (translator of Talk to My Back) as "three daughters of Garo"; Holmberg argued Yamada's age and motherhood made the moniker "highly misleading", and that while male artists are not usually distinguished by gender, the moniker does so for the female artists and implies that women are inherently bound to families. Holmberg argued that, therefore, the moniker displays sexism.

== Works ==
Title	Year	Notes	Refs
"My Left Hand..." (ひだり手の... Hidari te no...)	May 1969	Published in COM.	
"Touch-me-not" (鳳仙花 Hōsenka)	July 1969	Published in COM.	
"That's Mine" (あれわわたしの Are wa watashi no)	October 1969	Published in COM.	
"Poems to the Empyrean" (Sora e no uta)	March–December 1970	A collection of poems with illustrations, published in COM.	
"My Lover" (わたしの恋人 Watashi no koibito)	May 1970	Published in Funny, a magazine. It was one of her two shōjo manga.	
"I Have a Question" (しつもんがありんす Shitsumon ga arimasu)	August 1970	Published in COM.	
"Oh, the Ways of the World" (ああせけんさま Aa Seken-sama)	February 1971	One-shot in Garo	
"Sassy Cats" (性悪猫 Shōwaruneko)	March 1973	Published in Apple Core (アップルコア). In 1978 a version with new illustrations was published in Garo.	
"When the Wind Blew" (風の吹く頃 Kaze no fuku koro)	May 15, 1973	Published in Big Comic	
"My Blue Star" (わたしの青い星 Watashi no aoi hoshi)	September 1978	One-shot in Gals Life (ギャルズライフ). Described by Holmberg as a shōjo work "For all intents and purposes", it was published under the author name Mitsuko Nagatsuki (九月三津子 Nagatsuki Mitsuko) to hide the fact from her husband that she was writing manga again. This pen name included her given name and Nagatsuki; the latter referred to her birth month.	
Sassy Cats (性悪猫 Shōwaru-Neko)	August 1980	Published by Seirindō; In 2009 Shogakukan published a new and expanded edition, the Shogakukan Creative version. The 2009 edition was translated into English by Drawn and Quarterly, release scheduled in November 2026.	
Talk to My Back (しんきらり, Shin Kirari)	1981–1984	A slice-of-life story about a mother and wife who realises her marriage is failing. Serialized in Garo, published in 2 vol. by Seirindō. Translated into English by Drawn & Quarterly	
Dumdums and Wildcat (鈍たちとやま猫 Dontachi to yamaneko)	October 1981	Published by Seirindō.	
A Blue Flame, known in Japan as A Shimmering Pale Color (ゆらりうす色 Yurari Usuiro)	1983-1984	Published in Comic Morning, and in book form by Kodansha. In 1986 it was adapted into a film titled Bed In (ベッド・イン). Published in English by Drawn & Quarterly in the collection Second Hand Love.	
A Cat Watches from the Trees (Ki no ue de neko ga miteru)	1983-1992	Published in La Mer.	
His Majesty, Mr. Goldfish (Kingyō no tonosama)	1984-1985	Published in Comic Baku.	
The Burden of Happiness (しあわせつぶて Shiawase tsubute)	1984-1985	Published in Shinsen.	
This Is How Cats Have Come and Gone (Kōshite neko ga fuetari hettari)	1985-1986	Published in Garo.	
Second Hand Love (Note: The comic is titled in Japanese with Latin characters)	1986-1987	Published in Comic Baku. Published in English by Drawn & Quarterly in the collection Second Hand Love.	
Yume no Maigo-tachi: Les Enfants Reveurs (夢の迷子たち)	1988-1990	with Yōko Isaka, published in Garo	
Blue Sky	1992–1993	Follows a woman's life and struggles after she divorces.	
Otogizōshi (御伽草子)	1997	A manga adaptation of Otogizōshi, a traditional tale.	
Ai no Katachi (愛のかたち)	2004		

_{Sources:}
