= Land (manga) =

Japanese manga series

- First tankōbon volume cover, featuring An

ランド (Rando)
- Genre: Horror; Science fantasy
- Manga
- Written by: Kazumi Yamashita
- Published by: Kodansha
- English publisher: NA: Yen Press
- Imprint: Morning KC
- Magazine: Morning
- Original run: March 13, 2014 – July 9, 2020
- Volumes: 11
- icon

Land (Japanese: ランド, Hepburn: Rando) is a Japanese manga series written and illustrated by Kazumi Yamashita. It was serialized in Kodansha's seinen manga magazine Morning from March 2014 to July 2020, with its chapters collected in 11 tankōbon volumes. The manga has been licensed for English release in North America by Yen Press.

The series won the 25th Tezuka Osamu Cultural Prize in 2021.

== Synopsis ==
The story takes place in a world reminiscent of Japan from the late Edo period to the Taishō era. An (杏), a young girl living in a rural village surrounded by mountains and four great guardian deities, often dreams of what lies beyond the mountains—a place forbidden by village law. By chance, she learns that certain individuals can travel to the other side of the mountains. Pursuing one such person, An begins to glimpse the secrets hidden within her village and the world itself.

== Publication ==
Written and illustrated by Kazumi Yamashita, Land was serialized in Kodansha's seinen manga magazine Morning from March 13, 2014, to July 9, 2020. Kodansha collected its chapters in eleven tankōbon volumes, released from April 23, 2015, to September 18, 2020.

In August 2024, Yamashita confirmed on her Twitter account that an English version was being planned. In February 2025, Yen Press announced that it had licensed the series for English publication and would release it in an omnibus edition. The first volume was released on September 9, 2025.

=== Volumes ===
No.	Original release date	Original ISBN	English release date	English ISBN
1	April 23, 2015	978-4-06-388402-9	September 9, 2025	979-8-8554-2108-8
2	November 20, 2015	978-4-06-388459-3	September 9, 2025	979-8-8554-2108-8
3	July 22, 2016	978-4-06-388624-5	April 28, 2026	979-8-8554-2186-6
4	January 23, 2017	978-4-06-388699-3	April 28, 2026	979-8-8554-2186-6
5	September 22, 2017	978-4-06-510273-2	September 22, 2026	979-8-8554-2188-0
6	March 23, 2018	978-4-06-511093-5	September 22, 2026	979-8-8554-2188-0
7	September 21, 2018	978-4-06-512801-5	January 26, 2027	979-8-8554-2190-3
8	March 22, 2019	978-4-06-514956-0	January 26, 2027	979-8-8554-2190-3
9	September 20, 2019	978-4-06-517134-9	—	—
10	March 23, 2020	978-4-06-518921-4	—	—
11	September 18, 2020	978-4-06-520765-9	—	—

== Reception ==
Land placed 13th on Takarajimasha's Kono Manga ga Sugoi! ranking of top 20 manga for male readers in 2016. The series ranked 50th, alongside What Did You Eat Yesterday?, on Da Vinci magazine's 17th annual "Book of the Year" 2017 list. In December 2019, Brutus magazine included the series on their "Most Dangerous Manga" list, which included works with the most "stimulating" and thought-provoking themes. The series won the 25th Tezuka Osamu Cultural Prize's Grand Prize in 2021. In 2026, it has been nominated for the Eisner Award's Best U.S. Edition of International Material—Asia category and the Harvey Award's Best Manga category.
