= Kazumi Yamashita (artist) =

Japanese manga artist

Kazumi Yamashita 山下和美
- Born: August 15, 1959 (age 67) Otaru, Hokkaido, Japan
- Area: Manga artist
- Notable works: The Life of Genius Professor Yanagizawa
- Awards: 2003 Kodansha Manga Award for general manga - The Life of Genius Professor Yanagizawa; 2021 Tezuka Osamu Cultural Prize for Land

Kazumi Yamashita (山下 和美, Yamashita Kazumi; born 15 August 1959 in Otaru, Hokkaido) is a Japanese manga artist.

Yamashita started her career as a shōjo manga artist. She made her debut as a professional artist in 1980 in the magazine Margaret. In her early years, she was inspired by the style of Mariko Iwadate. She is best known for The Life of Genius Professor Yanagizawa, which is being published in the seinen magazine Morning, and for which she received the 2003 Kodansha Manga Award for general manga. The main character of the manga is modeled after her father.

For her series Land she received the Grand Prize at the Tezuka Osamu Cultural Prize 2021.

== Selected works ==
- Dandy and Me (ダンディーとわたし, Dandii to Watashi) (1987–1996)
- The Life of Genius Professor Yanagizawa (天才柳沢教授の生活, Tensai Yanagisawa Kyoju no Seikatsu), (1988–present; on hiatus)
- Wonder Boy (不思議な少年, Fushigi na Shōnen) (2001–2020; on hiatus)
- Suki desu! (数寄です!), 2010–2013
- Land (ランド, Rando) (2014–2020)
