= List of Delicious in Dungeon chapters =

The chapters of Delicious in Dungeon are written and illustrated by Ryoko Kui. The series was serialized in Enterbrain's Harta magazine from February 15, 2014, to September 15, 2023. Enterbrain collected its chapters in 14 tankōbon volumes, released from January 15, 2014, to December 15, 2023.

In October 2016, North American publisher Yen Press announced it had licensed the series. The 14 volumes were released from May 23, 2017, to July 23, 2024.

== Volumes ==
No.	Original release date	Original ISBN	English release date	English ISBN
1	January 15, 2015	978-4-04-730153-5	May 23, 2017	978-0-31-647185-5
1. "Hot Pot" (水炊き, Mizutaki); 2. "Tart" (タルト, Taruto); 3. "Roast Basilisk" (ローストバジリスク, Rōsuto Bajirisuku); 4. "Omelet" (オムレツ, Omuretsu); 5. "Kakiage" (かき揚げ); 6. "Living Armor -1-" (動く鎧 ‐1‐, Ugoku Yoroi ‐1‐); 7. "Living Armor -2-" (動く鎧 ‐2‐, Ugoku Yoroi ‐2‐); Bonus. "Miscellaneous Monster Tales -1-" (モンスターよもやま話1, Monsutā Yomoyamabanashi 1)
2	August 12, 2015	978-4-04-730676-9	August 22, 2017	978-0-31-647308-8
8. "Stewed Cabbage" (キャベツ煮, Kyabetsu Ni); 9. "Orcs" (オーク, Ōku); 10. "Snacks" (おやつ, Oyatsu); 11. "Sorbet" (ソルベ, Sorube); 12. "Court Cuisine" (宮廷料理, Kyūtei Ryōri); 13. "Boiled in Salt Water" (塩茹で, Shioyude); 14. "Kelpie" (水棲馬, Kerupī); Bonus. "Miscellaneous Monster Tales -2-" (モンスターよもやま話2, Monsutā Yomoyamabanashi 2)
3	August 12, 2016	978-4-04-734243-9	November 14, 2017	978-0-31-641279-7
15. "Porridge" (雑炊, Zōsui); 16. "Broiled with Sauce" (蒲焼き, Kabayaki); 17. "Raspberries" (木苺, Kiichigo); 18. "Grilled Meat" (焼き肉, Yakiniku); 19. "Tentacles" (テンタクルス, Tentakurusu); 20. "Stew" (シチュー, Shichū); 21. "Giant Frogs" (大ガエル, Ōgaeru); Bonus. "Miscellaneous Monster Tales -3-" (モンスターよもやま話3, Monsutā Yomoyamabanashi 3)
4	February 15, 2017	978-4-04-734417-4	February 20, 2018	978-0-31-644640-2
22. "Aboveground" (地上にて, Chijō nite); 23. "Red Dragon I" (炎竜1, Reddo Doragon 1); 24. "Red Dragon II" (炎竜2, Reddo Doragon 2); 25. "Red Dragon III" (炎竜3, Reddo Doragon 3); 26. "Red Dragon IV" (炎竜4, Reddo Doragon 4); 27. "Red Dragon V" (炎竜5, Reddo Doragon 5); 28. "Red Dragon VI" (炎竜6, Reddo Doragon 6); Bonus. "Miscellaneous Monster Tales -4-" (モンスターよもやま話4, Monsutā Yomoyamabanashi 4)
5	August 10, 2017	978-4-04-734631-4	May 22, 2018	978-19-7532644-9
29. "Red Dragon VII" (炎竜7, Reddo Doragon 7); 30. "Good Medicine" (良薬, Ryōyaku); 31. "Sea Serpent, Part 1" (シーサーペント 前編, Shīsāpento Zenpen); 32. "Sea Serpent, Part 2" (シーサーペント 後編, Shīsāpento Kōhen); 33. "Dryad" (ドライアド, Doraiado); 34. "Cockatrice" (コカトリス, Kokatorisu); 35. "Cleaners" (掃除屋, Sōjiya); Bonus. "Miscellaneous Monster Tales -5-" (モンスターよもやま話5, Monsutā Yomoyamabanashi 5)
6	April 13, 2018	978-4-04-735131-8	November 13, 2018	978-19-7532805-4
36. "Dried With Sweet Sake" (みりん干し, Mirin boshi); 37. "Harpy" (ハーピー, Hāpī); 38. "Chimera" (キメラ, Kimera); 39. "Shapeshifter -1-" (シェイプシフター ‐1‐, Sheipu Shifutā ‐1‐); 40. "Shapeshifter -2-" (シェイプシフター ‐2‐, Sheipu Shifutā ‐2‐); 41. "Hag" (山姥, Yamanba); 42. "Nightmare" (夢魔, Muma); Bonus. "Miscellaneous Monster Tales -6-" (モンスターよもやま話6, Monsutā Yomoyamabanashi 6)
7	April 12, 2019	978-4-04-735639-9	October 29, 2019	978-19-7535858-7
43. "Ice Golem" (アイスゴーレム, Aisu Gōremu); 44. "Barometz" (バロメッツ, Baromettsu); 45. "Egg" (卵, Tamago); 46. "The Golden Country" (黄金郷, Ōgonkyō); 47. "Griffin" (グリフィン, Gurifin); 48. "Familiars" (使い魔, Tsukaima); 49. "Griffin Soup" (グリフィンのスープ, Gurifin no Sūpu); Bonus. "Miscellaneous Monster Tales -7-" (モンスターよもやま話7, Monsutā Yomoyamabanashi 7)
8	September 14, 2019	978-4-04-735626-9	March 17, 2020	978-19-7539940-5
50. "Dumplings -1-" (ダンプリング ‐1‐, Danpuringu ‐1‐); 51. "Dumplings -2-" (ダンプリング ‐2‐, Danpuringu ‐2‐); 52. "Bacon and Eggs" (ベーコンエッグ, Bēkon'Eggu); 53. "On Floor One -1-" (地下1階にて ‐1‐, Chika 1-kai Nite ‐1‐); 54. "On Floor One -2-" (地下1階にて ‐2‐, Chika 1-kai Nite ‐2‐); 55. "On Floor One -3-" (地下1階にて ‐3‐, Chika 1-kai Nite ‐3‐); 56. "Bicorn" (バイコーン, Baikōn); Bonus. "Miscellaneous Monster Tales -8-" (モンスターよもやま話8, Monsutā Yomoyamabanashi 8)
9	May 15, 2020	978-4-04-736116-4	January 19, 2021	978-19-7532016-4
57. "Stewed Head" (兜煮, Kabutoni); 58. "Succubus -1-" (サキュバス 前編, Sakyubasu Zenpen); 59. "Succubus -2-" (サキュバス 後編, Sakyubasu Kōhen); 60. "The Winged Lion" (有翼の獅子, Yūyoku no Shishi); 61. "Roasted Walking Mushroom" (焼き歩き茸, Yaki Aruki Kinoko); 62. "Six Days" (6日間, 6-Kakan); Bonus. "Miscellaneous Monster Tales -9-" (モンスターよもやま話9, Monsutā Yomoyamabanashi 9)
10	February 13, 2021	978-4-04-736274-1	March 1, 2022	978-19-7533558-8
63. "Confit" (コンフィ, Konfi); 64. "Rabbits -1-" (ウサギ ‐1‐, Usagi ‐1‐); 65. "Rabbits -2-" (ウサギ ‐2‐, Usagi ‐2‐); 66. "Curry -1-" (カレー ‐1‐, Karē ‐1‐); 67. "Curry -2-" (カレー ‐2‐, Karē ‐2‐); 68. "Sissel -1-" (シスル ‐1‐, Shisuru ‐1‐); 69. "Sissel -2-" (シスル ‐2‐, Shisuru ‐2‐); Bonus. "Miscellaneous Monster Tales -10-" (モンスターよもやま話10, Monsutā Yomoyamabanashi 10)
11	September 15, 2021	978-4-04-736622-0	August 23, 2022	978-19-7534672-0
70. "Sissel -3-" (シスル ‐3‐, Shisuru ‐3‐); 71. "Sissel -4-" (シスル ‐4‐, Shisuru ‐4‐); 72. "Sissel -5-" (シスル ‐5‐, Shisuru ‐5‐); 73. "Bavarois" (ババロア, Babaroa); 74. "Liricmumwarei" (リリクムムアレ, Ririkumumuare); 75. "Lord of the Dungeon -1-" (迷宮の主 ‐1‐, Meikyū no Aruji ‐1‐); 76. "Lord of the Dungeon -2-" (迷宮の主 ‐2‐, Meikyū no Aruji ‐2‐); Bonus. "Miscellaneous Monster Tales -11-" (モンスターよもやま話11, Monsutā Yomoyamabanashi 11)
12	August 10, 2022	978-4-04-737046-3	May 23, 2023	978-19-7536798-5
77. "Dungeon -1-" (迷宮, Meikyū); 78. "Dungeon -2-" (迷宮2, Meikyū 2); 79. "Parasites" (寄生虫, Kiseichū); 80. "The Food Chain" (食物連鎖, Shokumotsu Rensa); 81. "Local Cuisine" (郷土料理, Kyōdo Ryōri); 82. "Marcille -1-" (マルシル, Marushiru); 83. "Marcille -2-" (マルシル2, Marushiru 2); 84. "Marcille -3-" (マルシル3, Marushiru 3); 85. "Marcille -4-" (マルシル4, Marushiru 4); Bonus. "Miscellaneous Monster Tales -12-" (モンスターよもやま話12, Monsutā Yomoyamabanashi 12)
13	December 15, 2023	978-4-04-737456-0	March 19, 2024	978-19-7539385-4
86. "Winged Lion -1-" (翼獅子, Yokujishi); 87. "Winged Lion -2-" (翼獅子2, Yokujishi 2); 88. "Winged Lion -3-" (翼獅子3, Yokujishi 3); 89. "Winged Lion -4-" (翼獅子4, Yokujishi 4); 90. "Winged Lion -5-" (翼獅子5, Yokujishi 5); 91. "Winged Lion -6-" (翼獅子6, Yokujishi 6); Bonus. "Miscellaneous Monster Tales -13-" (モンスターよもやま話13, Monsutā Yomoyamabanashi 13)
14	December 15, 2023	978-4-04-737740-0	July 23, 2024	979-88-5540035-9
92. "The Island" (島, Shima); 93. "Falin -1-" (ファリン ‐1‐, Farin ‐1‐); 94. "Falin -2-" (ファリン ‐2‐, Farin ‐2‐); 95. "Falin -3-" (ファリン ‐3‐, Farin ‐3‐); 96. "Falin -4-" (ファリン ‐4‐, Farin ‐4‐); 97. "Delicious in Dungeon" (ダンジョン飯, Danjon Meshi); Bonus. "Miscellaneous Monster Tales -14-" (モンスターよもやま話14, Monsutā Yomoyamabanashi 14)
