= Brittany Cox =

American voice actress

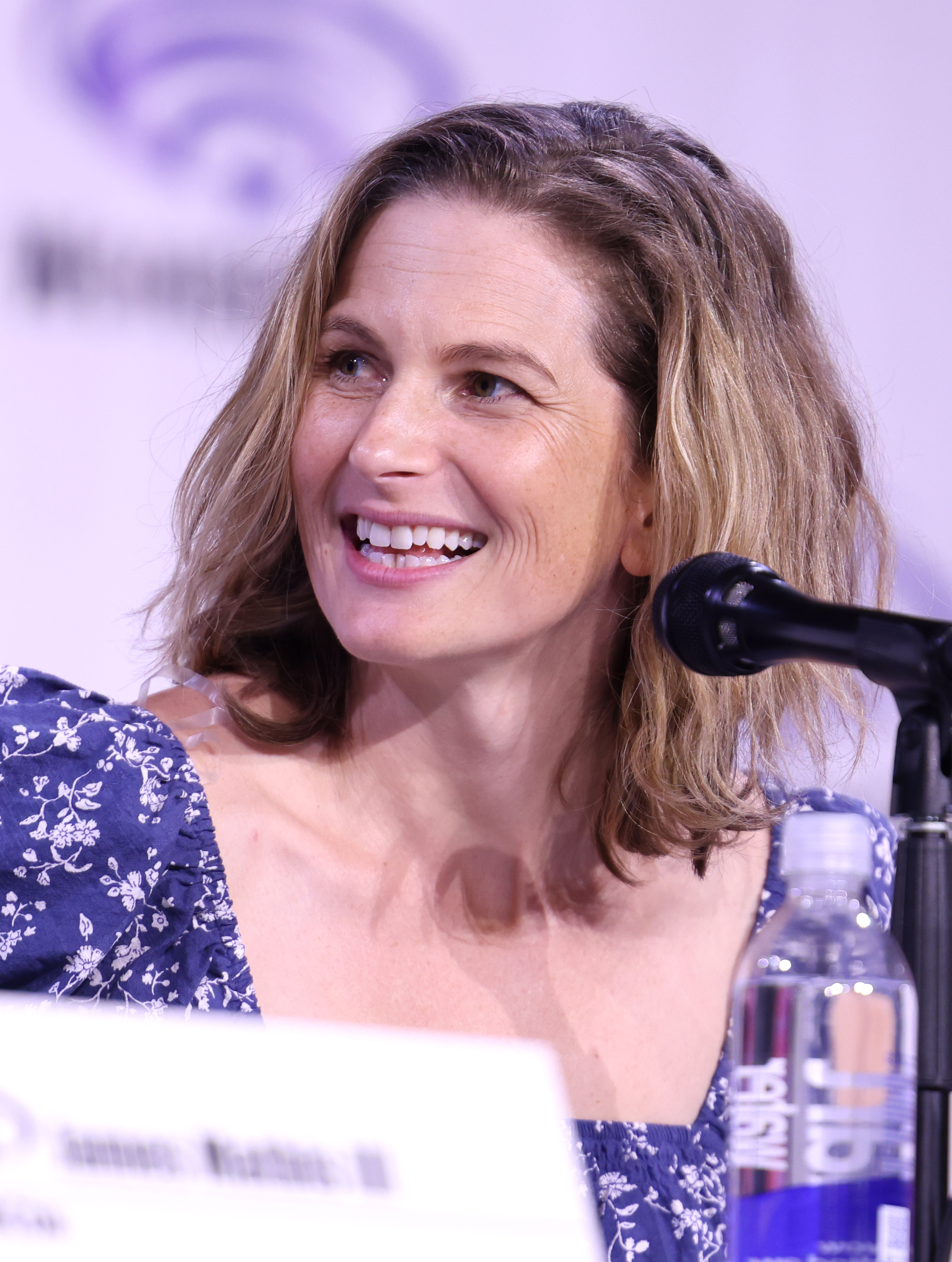
- Cox in 2026
- Occupation: Voice actress
- Years active: 2019–present
- Website: www.brittanycoxvo.com

Brittany Cox is an American voice actress, known for her work on video games and English dubs of anime. Cox is known for voicing Fena Houtman in Fena: Pirate Princess, and since 2019, Nancy Drew in the video game series.

== Biography ==
Cox got her start in acting with theater in Seattle, Washington, alongside some on-camera jobs. After being offered an impromptu job for a voice over commercial, she "found more artistic freedom behind a microphone than in front of an audience or camera" and pursued voice acting. Cox eventually moved to Los Angeles, California, and after a year was cast in her first lead role in a video game.

At the 6th Crunchyroll Anime Awards in 2022, Cox was nominated in the Best Voice Artist Performance (English) category, for her role as Fena Houtman in Fena: Pirate Princess.

== Filmography ==
=== Animated series ===
List of voice performances in animated series
Year	Title	Role	Notes	Ref.
2020	Rainbow High	Bella Parker, Kira's Mom		
2020	Pokémon Journeys	Sonia		
2021	Thus Spoke Rohan Kishibe	Kyoka Izumi		
2021	Godzilla Singular Point	Satomi Kanahara		
2021	Dragon Goes House-Hunting	Mia		
2021	Fena: Pirate Princess	Fena Houtman		
2022	Don't Toy with Me, Miss Nagatoro	Gamo	Season 1-2	
2022	Kotaro Lives Alone	Sawaguchi		
2022	Lupin the 3rd Part 6	Amelia		
2023	Nier: Automata Ver1.1a	Kin		
2023	Ooku: The Inner Chambers	Sato		
2024	The Elusive Samurai	Ayako		
2025	Synduality: Noir	Isabel		
2025	Tatsuki Fujimoto 17-26	Chieko Kawaguchi		

=== Film ===
List of voice performances in film
Year	Title	Role	Notes	Ref.
2019	Okko's Inn	Glory Suiryo		
2020	Altered Carbon: Resleeved	Holly Togram		
2021	The Night Is Short, Walk On Girl	Naoko		

=== Video games ===
List of voice performances in video games
Year	Title	Role	Notes	Ref.
2019	Fire Emblem: Three Houses	Ingrid		
2019	Nancy Drew: Midnight in Salem	Nancy Drew		
2020	Guardian Tales	Mk. 99		
2020	Pokémon Masters EX	Lisia		
2020	Fire Emblem Heroes	Lena, Ingrid		
2020	Genshin Impact	Fischl		
2021	Cookie Run: Kingdom	Chess Choco Cookie		
2021	Punishing: Gray Raven	Haicma		
2021	Astria Ascending	Eko		
2022	Gunvolt Chronicles: Luminous Avenger iX 2	Vespa		
2022	WWE 2K22	Josie Jane		
2022	Aether Gazer	Sekhmet		
2022	Fire Emblem Warriors: Three Hopes	Ingrid Brandl Galatea		
2022	Tower of Fantasy	Samir		
2022	Goddess of Victory: Nikke	Signal, Soldier EG, Product 08		
2023	Octopath Traveler II	Kaldena		
2023	Lego 2K Drive	Vicki Wheeler, Bertie Backfire, Carla		
2023	Tower of God: New World	Ha-Yuri Zahard		
2024	Unicorn Overlord	Theodora		
2024	AFK Journey	Gerda		
2024	Nancy Drew: Mystery of the Seven Keys	Nancy Drew		
2024	The Legend of Heroes: Trails Through Daybreak	Judith Lanster		
2024	Card-en-Ciel	Ibuki, Padma, Riko Kuroda, Vespa		
2024	Marvel Rivals	Angela		
2025	The Legend of Heroes: Trails through Daybreak II	Judith Lanster		
2025	Octopath Traveler 0	Eltrix		
2026	The Legend of Heroes: Trails Beyond the Horizon	Judith Lanster		
2026	Star Fox (2026 video game)	Katt Monroe		
