= Terrarium in a Drawer =

Japanese manga series

- Cover of the manga

ひきだしにテラリウム (Hikidashi ni Terrarium)
- Genre: Comedy, Fantasy
- Manga
- Written by: Ryoko Kui
- Published by: East Press
- English publisher: NA: Yen Press
- Magazine: Matogrosso
- Original run: August 2011 – December 2012
- Volumes: 1

Terrarium in a Drawer (ひきだしにテラリウム, Hikidashi ni Terrarium) is a Japanese manga written and illustrated by Ryoko Kui. The manga is Kui's third comic anthology series with its original publicationrunning from August 2011 to December 2012 in East Press' Matogrosso magazine. On March 14, 2013, the series would be collected into a single tankōbon volume. The manga is licensed in English by Yen Press, who will release the sole volume on November 24, 2026.

== Description ==
Terrarium in a Drawer is a collection of 33 short stories detailing the lives of multiple unrelated characters, creating unique isolated worlds and protagonists not connected by a linear overarching narrative. The stories in the anthology are short with the longest running eleven pages and the shortest being two pages. Kui's art style for this manga is kept minimalistic, apart from stories where she is parodying another genre or style. The manga's tone ranges from fantastical ("Wrath of the Dragon"), to conceptual ("Eating Symbols"), to everyday ("Sense of Scale"). Terrarium in a Drawer explores varied genres including fantasy, romance, cyberpunk, mechs, and depictions of everyday life. The manga examines each of its highly fictional situations with a realistic lens, giving it a sense of authenticity that is seen in Kui's other work, Delicious in Dungeon.

== Reception ==
It won an Excellence Award for manga at the 17th Japan Media Arts Festival Awards. It was number seven on the 2014 Kono Manga ga Sugoi! Top 20 Manga for Male Readers survey. It was nominated for the 7th Manga Taishō, receiving 54 points and placing 5th among the ten nominees.
