= Delicious in Dungeon =

Japanese manga series

- First tankōbon volume cover, featuring (from left to right) Laios Touden, Senshi, Chilchuck Tims, and Marcille Donato

ダンジョン飯 (Danjon Meshi)
- Genre: Adventure; Cooking; Fantasy comedy
- Manga
- Written by: Ryoko Kui
- Published by: Enterbrain
- English publisher: NA: Yen Press
- Magazine: Harta
- Original run: February 15, 2014 – September 15, 2023
- Volumes: 14
- Anime television series
- Directed by: Yoshihiro Miyajima
- Produced by: Julien Vig; Kazufumi Kikushima; Tong Wu; Yoshiki Usa
- Written by: Kimiko Ueno
- Music by: Yasunori Mitsuda; Shunsuke Tsuchiya
- Studio: Trigger
- Licensed by: Netflix
- Original network: Tokyo MX, SUN, KBS, TVA, AT-X, BS11 (S1)
- Original run: January 4, 2024 – present
- Episodes: 24
- icon

Delicious in Dungeon (Japanese: ダンジョン飯, Hepburn: Danjon Meshi; lit. 'Dungeon Meals'), is a Japanese manga series written and illustrated by Ryoko Kui. It was serialized in Enterbrain's seinen manga magazine Harta from February 2014 to September 2023, with its chapters collected in 14 tankōbon volumes. The story follows a group of adventurers in a fantasy world who, after failing to defeat a dragon that consumed one of their own, embark on a journey through a dungeon to revive her, surviving by cooking and eating the monsters they encounter along the way.

Yen Press has licensed the series in North America. An anime television series adaptation produced by Trigger aired from January to June 2024. A second season is set to premiere in October 2027.

== Plot ==
In a fantasy world of dungeon exploration, adventuring parties set out on expeditions to raid dungeons. Many hope to find the mysterious Golden Country located in the dungeon, discovered after its king crawled to the surface and promised his kingdom to whoever defeats the "Lunatic Magician". Those who are killed in the dungeon are able to be revived depending on how intact their bodies are. The story begins as a group of adventurers unsuccessfully attempt to slay a red dragon, which consumes Falin Touden, a "tallman" (human equivalent) spellcaster. Falin casts a spell that teleports her party to safety. The remaining members of the party—Laios Touden, a tallman swordsman and Falin's brother; Marcille Donato, an elven spellcaster who met Falin in school and has since become a close friend, and Chilchuck Tims, a half-foot locksmith—seek to rescue Falin before she is digested. With most of their supplies left behind in the dungeon, Laios, who is fascinated by the ecology and creatures of the dungeon, suggests they sustain themselves by eating monsters, to which Marcille and Chilchuck reluctantly agree. Inside, they are immediately joined by Senshi, a dwarf with many years of experience surviving in the dungeon by cooking monsters and harvesting local resources to the dungeon. They are later joined by Izutsumi, an eastern tallman who seeks to undo a curse binding a cat soul to her own. The story details their travels through the dungeon, the environments, traps, and monsters they encounter, and the meals they create.

== Production ==
Series creator Ryoko Kui said in an interview that she had been a picky eater since childhood. She explained that as a child she enjoyed thinking about which monster was the strongest while drawing pictures of monsters, and she used those memories when creating the manga. Initially, she planned to write a dungeon-exploration manga as a hobby, but after receiving support from her editor Masaru Hiroi, she decided to make it a long-running series. Kui initially wanted to serialize a science fiction manga titled Nō no Naka o Kaku (脳の中を描く; lit. 'Drawing Inside the Brain'), but Hiroi repeatedly rejected this idea and noticed her work on the desk that would later become Delicious in Dungeon. In the manga's original draft, there was far too much material, so the editors had to cut many parts. Kui had wanted the characters to speak in various languages, but she was concerned that such elements might bore readers and distract from the story, so she removed them. Because she wanted the entire story to take place solely within the dungeon, she initially did not want to give the characters surnames or name the country where the dungeon is located; however, as the story progressed, Hiroi asked her to add more characters and expand the world. Before the manga was serialized, Kui read fantasy works like The Neverending Story and The Lord of the Rings, and she began reading Dungeons & Dragons rulebooks and playing role-playing games like Legend of Grimrock for inspiration. She specifically mentioned that the 1990 game Wizardry VI: Bane of the Cosmic Forge was the biggest source of inspiration for the manga. The title for the manga series was chosen by Hiroi.

For the anime adaptation, Ryoko Kui preferred Yasunori Mitsuda as the composer, since she liked the soundtrack he made for Chrono Cross. Director Yoshihiro Miyajima said in an interview that he had been familiar with Ryoko Kui's works since 2011 and that when the manga began serialization in 2014, he had dreamed of one day creating an anime adaptation of the manga. He frequently consulted with Kui on the anime adaptation and sought her thoughts on the characters' inner perspectives. Miyajima said that Delicious in Dungeon World Guide: The Adventurer's Bible which provides detailed information about the world of the manga, was very helpful to him. Character designer Naoki Takeda also joined the project as a fan of the manga series. They consulted professional food designer Mao Momichi so that the foods in the anime would look delicious while retaining their "monstrous" vibe. About a hundred voice actors were invited to audition for each of the characters Laios, Marcille, Chilchuck, and Senshi. According to Miyajima, finding an actor to voice Laios was difficult because they were looking for someone who could naturally express Laios's "eccentricity". To help them understand what it's like to eat dungeon food, the staff provided them with insects to eat.

== Media ==
=== Manga ===
Written and illustrated by Ryoko Kui, Delicious in Dungeon was serialized in Enterbrain's Harta magazine from February 15, 2014, to September 15, 2023. Enterbrain collected its chapters in 14 tankōbon volumes, released from January 15, 2014, to December 15, 2023.

In October 2016, North American publisher Yen Press announced it had licensed the series. The 14 volumes were released from May 23, 2017, to July 23, 2024.

=== Anime ===
Delicious in Dungeon received an anime television adaptation produced by Trigger. It is directed by Yoshihiro Miyajima, with scripts written by Kimiko Ueno, character designs by Naoki Takeda, and music composed by Yasunori Mitsuda and Shunsuke Tsuchiya. For the first cours, the opening theme song is "Sleep Walking Orchestra", performed by Bump of Chicken, while the ending theme song is "Party!!", performed by Ryokuoushoku Shakai. For the second cours, the opening theme song is "Unmei" (運命; lit. 'Destiny'), performed by Sumika, while the ending theme song is "Kirakira no Hai" (キラキラの灰; lit. 'Twinkling Ash'), performed by Regal Lily. The series aired its first season in two consecutive cours from January 4 to June 13, 2024, on Tokyo MX and other networks, with Netflix licensing it for streaming and simuldubbing worldwide weekly.

A second season was announced in June 2024. It is set to premiere worldwide on Netflix in October 2027.

=== Other media ===
Additional comics, sketches, and full color illustrations drawn over the course of the series' creation were released as five short artbooks published with Harta volumes under the name Daydream Hour from August 12, 2016, to August 12, 2022, with unpublished illustrations released on Harta's official website for a limited time on May 11, 2020. A compilation artbook, Doodles by Ryoko Kui: Daydream Hour (九井諒子ラクガキ本 デイドリーム・アワー, Ryoko Kui Rakugaki Hon Daydream Hour), was published on January 15, 2024. Yen Press released it in English on May 27, 2025.

On August 1, 2017, a stop motion animation, subtitled Senshi's Easy Cooking! (センシのかんたんクッキング！, Senshi no Kantan Kukkingu!), was released on YouTube to commemorate the release of the manga's fifth volume. On September 5, 2019, an animated commercial produced by Trigger was released to promote the manga's eighth volume.

Senshi's Diary (センシの日記 生活の記録, Senshi no Nikki Seikatsu no Kiroku; lit. 'Senshi's Diary: Record of Life'), a booklet written from the perspective of Senshi, was included with Harta on April 15, 2019, and later included in Delicious in Dungeon World Guide: The Adventurer's Bible. In Delicious in Dungeon World Guide: The Adventurer's Bible, Complete Edition additional pages were added. The complete edition of Senshi's Diary was also included with Harta on April 15, 2024.

Delicious in Dungeon World Guide: The Adventurer's Bible (ダンジョン飯 ワールドガイド 冒険者バイブル, Danjon Meshi Wārudogaido Bōken-sha Baiburu) art and reference book was released in Japan on February 13, 2021. It was released in English by Yen Press on August 23, 2022. An updated and expanded version, Delicious in Dungeon World Guide: The Adventurer's Bible, Complete Edition (ダンジョン飯 ワールドガイド 冒険者バイブル 完全版, Danjon Meshi Wārudogaido Bōken-sha Baiburu Kanzenban), was released in Japan on February 15, 2024. Yen Press released the later edition on July 22, 2025.

A board game by Arclight Games, Monster Eater: A Delicious in Dungeon Board Game (モンスターイーター ～ダンジョン飯 ボードゲーム～, Monsutāītā Danjon Meshi Bōdogēmu), based on the 1988 game Monster Maker, was released in Japan on September 15, 2022. It was released in English by Yen Press on May 26, 2026.

An exhibition event showcasing replicas of the food from the series was held at Shibuya N-space from January 18–21, 2024.

A Ryoko Kui and Delicious in Dungeon exhibition began touring Japan in 2024 and was held in New York from October 10–26, 2025.

==== Video game collaborations ====
From January 19 to February 2, 2024, the mobile RPG game Million Monster held a collaboration event with Delicious in Dungeon, featuring characters and monsters from the series.

From April 26 to May 10, 2024, the mobile RPG game Dragon Egg held a collaboration event with Delicious in Dungeon, featuring characters and monsters from the series.

From August 2–31, 2024, free to play idle RPG game Fortress Saga held a collaboration event with Delicious in Dungeon, featuring characters and skins from the series.

From March 10–31, 2025, Arknights held a collaboration event with Delicious in Dungeon, featuring characters from the series and a story centered on them.

From August 29 to September 25, 2025, the free to play fantasy tactical RPG game Sword of Convallaria held a collaboration event with Delicious in Dungeon, featuring characters from the series.

From November 28 to December 26, 2025, AFK Journey held a collaboration event with Delicious in Dungeon, including a custom cooking system. Before that, a connected crossover was held in AFK Arena from April 23 of that same year.

In November 2026, Capcom released a free limited-time downloadable content for Dragon's Dogma 2, featuring outfits and characters from the series.

== Reception ==
=== Manga ===
Volume 1 reached the 11th place on the weekly Oricon manga charts and it was the 87th best-selling manga volume in Japan from November 17, 2014, to May 17, 2015, with 315,298 copies sold. By August 2015, it had sold 381,614 copies. Volume 2 reached the third place on the charts, and by September 2015, it had sold 362,906 copies. By August 2017, the first four volumes had over 2 million copies in print. By October 2023, the manga had over 10 million copies in circulation; after its anime adaptation premiere, the number of copies in circulation increased in half a year to 14 million by March 2024, including digital copies.

The manga was chosen as the 13th best manga of 2015 in the Book of the Year manga ranking of Da Vinci magazine. The 2016 edition of the Kono Manga ga Sugoi! guidebook ranked the series at number one on its list of top 20 manga for male readers. The manga was nominated for the 9th to 12th Manga Taishō from 2016 to 2019. A panel at San Diego Comic-Con 2018 highlighted it as one of the "Best Continuing Series for Kids/Teens". It was also ranked second on Amazon Japan's Best-Selling Kindle Book Rankings for 2018. In 2024, the manga won the 55th Seiun Award's Best Comic award. It also won the Japan Society and Anime NYC's first American Manga Awards in the Best Continuing Manga Series category in 2024. It won the Harvey Awards in the Best Manga category in the same year.

=== Anime ===
On the review aggregator website Rotten Tomatoes, 100% of seven critics' reviews are positive. In the Anime Corner awards of Winter 2024, the anime won Best Adventure and Best Comedy, based on 62,120 votes. At the 9th Crunchyroll Anime Awards in 2025, the series received 16 nominations including Anime of the Year, but failed to win any awards; as a result, it set the record for an anime series in a single edition to receive the "most losses without a single win" in Crunchyroll history. This outcome led to speculation about a potential bias against non-Crunchyroll platforms, with many fans questioning whether the series was deliberately overlooked.

==== Accolades ====
Year	Award	Category	Recipient	Result	Ref.
2024	30th Manga Barcelona Awards	Best Anime Series Premiere	Delicious in Dungeon	Won	
2024	Abema Anime Trend Awards	Abema Special Award - Best Food Animation	Delicious in Dungeon	Won	
2025	Reiwa Anisong Awards	Artist Song Award	"Sleep Walking Orchestra" by Bump of Chicken	Nominated	
2025	AT-X	Top Anime Ranking	Delicious in Dungeon	13th place	
2025	11th Anime Trending Awards	Anime of the Year	Delicious in Dungeon	Nominated	
2025	11th Anime Trending Awards	Best in Adapted Screenplay	Kumiko Ueno	Nominated	
2025	11th Anime Trending Awards	Best in Animation	Delicious in Dungeon	Nominated	
2025	11th Anime Trending Awards	Best in Character Design	Naoki Takeda	Nominated	
2025	11th Anime Trending Awards	Best in Episode Directing and Storyboard	Episode 11: "Red Dragon I"	Nominated	
2025	11th Anime Trending Awards	Best in Sceneries and Visuals	Delicious in Dungeon	Nominated	
2025	11th Anime Trending Awards	Best in Soundtrack	Yasunori Mitsuda	Nominated	
2025	11th Anime Trending Awards	Best in Voice Cast	Delicious in Dungeon	Nominated	
2025	11th Anime Trending Awards	Action or Adventure Anime of the Year	Delicious in Dungeon	Nominated	
2025	11th Anime Trending Awards	Fantasy or Magical Anime of the Year	Delicious in Dungeon	Nominated	
2025	11th Anime Trending Awards	Best Voice Acting Performance – Male	Kentarō Kumagai as Laios Touden	Nominated	
2025	11th Anime Trending Awards	Best Voice Acting Performance – Female	Sayaka Senbongi as Marcille Donato	Nominated	
2025	9th Crunchyroll Anime Awards	Anime of the Year	Delicious in Dungeon	Nominated	
2025	9th Crunchyroll Anime Awards	Best New Series	Delicious in Dungeon	Nominated	
2025	9th Crunchyroll Anime Awards	Best Comedy	Delicious in Dungeon	Nominated	
2025	9th Crunchyroll Anime Awards	Best Animation	Delicious in Dungeon	Nominated	
2025	9th Crunchyroll Anime Awards	Best Background Art	Delicious in Dungeon	Nominated	
2025	9th Crunchyroll Anime Awards	Best Character Design	Naoki Takeda	Nominated	
2025	9th Crunchyroll Anime Awards	Best Director	Yoshihiro Miyajima	Nominated	
2025	9th Crunchyroll Anime Awards	Best Supporting Character	Senshi	Nominated	
2025	9th Crunchyroll Anime Awards	"Must Protect at All Costs" Character	Senshi	Nominated	
2025	9th Crunchyroll Anime Awards	Best Voice Artist Performance (Japanese)	Sayaka Senbongi as Marcille Donato	Nominated	
2025	9th Crunchyroll Anime Awards	Best Voice Artist Performance (English)	SungWon Cho as Senshi	Nominated	
2025	9th Crunchyroll Anime Awards	Best Voice Artist Performance (Arabic)	Lama AlSayyagh as Marcille Donato	Nominated	
2025	9th Crunchyroll Anime Awards	Best Voice Artist Performance (Arabic)	Nawar AlMahairi as Laios Touden	Nominated	
2025	9th Crunchyroll Anime Awards	Best Voice Artist Performance (German)	Magdalena Höfner as Marcille Donato	Nominated	
2025	9th Crunchyroll Anime Awards	Best Voice Artist Performance (Castilian)	Jorge Peña as Senshi	Nominated	
2025	9th Crunchyroll Anime Awards	Best Voice Artist Performance (Portuguese)	Bruna Laynes as Marcille Donato	Nominated	
2025	Japan Expo Awards	Daruma for Best Original Soundtrack	Yasunori Mitsuda	Nominated	
2025	20th AnimaniA Awards	Best TV Series: Online	Delicious in Dungeon	Nominated	
2025	20th AnimaniA Awards	Best Director	Yoshihiro Miyajima	Nominated	
2025	20th AnimaniA Awards	Best Studio	Trigger	Nominated	
2025	20th AnimaniA Awards	Best Anime Song	"Sleep Walking Orchestra" by Bump of Chicken	Nominated	
