= Dragon Goes House-Hunting =

Japanese manga series

- First tankōbon volume cover, featuring Letty

ドラゴン、家を買う。 (Dragon, Ie o Kau.)
- Genre: Fantasy comedy
- Manga
- Written by: Kawo Tanuki
- Illustrated by: Choco Aya
- Published by: Mag Garden
- English publisher: NA: Seven Seas Entertainment
- Magazine: Monthly Comic Garden
- Original run: December 5, 2016 – December 5, 2022
- Volumes: 10
- Anime television series
- Directed by: Haruki Kasugamori
- Music by: Kyōhei Matsuno
- Studio: Signal.MD
- Licensed by: Crunchyroll (Note: In North America through Crunchyroll, LLC (formerly known as Funimation).)
- Original network: Tokyo MX, ytv, BS Fuji
- Original run: April 4, 2021 – June 20, 2021
- Episodes: 12
- Manga

Gaiden
- Written by: Kawo Tanuki
- Illustrated by: Choco Aya
- Published by: Mag Garden
- Magazine: Monthly Comic Garden
- Original run: January 5, 2023 – May 2, 2023
- icon

Dragon Goes House-Hunting (ドラゴン、家を買う。, Dragon, Ie o Kau.; Dragon, Buy a House.) is a Japanese fantasy manga series written by Kawo Tanuki and illustrated by Choco Aya. It was serialized in Mag Garden's shōnen manga magazine Monthly Comic Garden from December 2016 to December 2022 and was collected in ten tankōbon volumes. The manga is licensed in North America by Seven Seas Entertainment. An anime television series adaptation produced by Signal.MD aired from April to June 2021.

== Plot ==
Letty, a red dragon, is cast out of his family's lair after failing to live up to traditional expectations of dragons. Unable to fly well, breathe fire properly, or defend himself, Letty sets out into the world to find a safe place to live. However, as a timid and weak dragon, he quickly discovers that life outside the lair is dangerous, with adventurers and monsters alike viewing him as prey or a trophy rather than a neighbor.

Letty's fortunes change when he meets Dearia, an elf who is secretly a Demon Lord, who also works as an architect and real estate agent. Dearia rescues Letty from hostile adventurers and offers to help him search for the perfect home, tailored to his needs. Together, they tour a variety of unconventional properties, encountering undead infestations, hostile tenants, and architectural disasters.

== Characters ==
Letty (レティ, Reti)
Voiced by: Shun Horie (Japanese); Michael Kovach (English)
A young red dragon, who despite his race's viciousness, happens to be weak and timid. After he gets kicked out by his family, he goes to search for his dream home where he can be safe. Due to circumstances beyond his control, he unintentionally becomes infamous as the Flame Dragon Lord.
Dearia (ディアリア, Diaria)
Voiced by: Kaito Ishikawa, Aoi Yūki (young) (Japanese); Steven Kelly, Megan Shipman (young) (English)
A powerful elf magician who is also a skilled architect and knows the real estate business, as well as a number of other personages. Over a thousand years ago, he accidentally inherited the Demon Lord title by "winning" it at a lottery, making him the supreme figurehead of all non-humans. He takes in Letty as his client to different estates to find him his dream home, partly because of his previous experience with another dragon.
Pip (ピーちゃん, Pī-chan)
Voiced by: Shiori Izawa (Japanese); Lindsay Sheppard (English)
Full name: Piyovelt Phelpia Pi Alpine Piyoderika. It is a hræsvelgr, a species of giant arctic eagle. After Letty finds its egg by happenstance and it hatches, the chick imprints on Letty, who eventually adopts it as a foundling.
Nell (ネル, Neru)
Voiced by: Misato Fukuen (Japanese); Jad Saxton (English)
Full name: Andriana Ellen Croixdea Margarethe Emmalyn Narsham Felna. She is a spoiled and stubborn human princess who ran away from home after her father ate a cupcake she had craved. After recognizing Letty's pacifistic nature, she joins him and Diaria on their home-hunting quest.
Hero (勇者, Yūsha)
Voiced by: Kent Itō (Japanese); Brendan Blaber (English)
A fighter and the leader of a quartet of "Heroes" who become Letty's comical nemeses by popping up wherever he wants to settle down, only to be killed or driven off and then return for yet another attempt.
Thief (シーフ, Shīfu)
Voiced by: Chiaki Takahashi (Japanese); Brittany Cox (English)
A member of Hero's adventuring party.
White Mage (白魔導士, Shiro Madōshi)
Voiced by: Daisuke Hirakawa
A member of Hero's adventuring party.
Archer (弓使い, Yumidzukai)
Voiced by: Koutaro Nishiyama (Japanese); Alexander Gross (English)
A member of Hero's adventuring party.
Huey (ヒューイ, Hyūi)
Voiced by: Takashi Kondō (Japanese); Daman Mills (English)
A human Hunter who stole the egg Letty was supposed to guard, leading to the dragon's banishment.
Albert (アルバート, Arubāto)
Voiced by: M.A.O (Japanese); Dawn M. Bennett (English)
A Cait (anthropomorphic cat) and Huey's Hunter partner.
Letty's father (レティの父, Reti no Chichi)
Voiced by: Tesshō Genda (Japanese); Jim Foronda (English)
Lord Samuel (サミュエル卿, Samyueru Kyō)
Voiced by: Jouji Nakata (Japanese); David Wald (English)
A former lord and the owner of a mansion on Diaria's list of available estates; in fact, in life he was an old friend of Diaria. Having become a wraith, he still haunts his family mansion with his undead retainers.
Varney (バーニー)
Voiced by: Kenjiro Tsuda (Japanese); Christopher Guerrero (English)
A petulant black dragon who, like Letty, long ago sought out Diaria for advice on a new home and became his first dragon travelling companion. He grandstandingly prefers to be referred to as the Mighty Black Dragon, a legendary harbinger of destruction.

== Media ==
=== Manga ===
The series is written by Kawo Tanuki and illustrated by Choco Aya. It was serialized in Mag Garden's shōnen manga magazine Monthly Comic Garden from December 5, 2016, to December 5, 2022, and was collected in ten tankōbon volumes. The manga is licensed in North America by Seven Seas Entertainment.

A spin-off manga was serialized in the same magazine from January 5, 2023, to May 2, 2023.

No.	Original release date	Original ISBN	English release date	English ISBN
1	July 10, 2017	978-4-80-000702-5	September 11, 2018	978-1-62-692885-5
2	January 10, 2018	978-4-80-000741-4	March 26, 2019	978-1-62-692979-1
3	August 10, 2018	978-4-80-000790-2	June 25, 2019	978-1-64-275092-8
4	April 10, 2019	978-4-80-000843-5	April 28, 2020	978-1-64-275747-7
5	October 10, 2019	978-4-80-000902-9	July 21, 2020	978-1-64-505495-5
6	May 9, 2020	978-4-80-000968-5	February 16, 2021	978-1-64-505963-9
7	April 9, 2021	978-4-80-001068-1	December 21, 2021	978-1-64827-329-2
8	December 9, 2021	978-4-80-001155-8	January 3, 2023	978-1-63858-222-9
9	October 6, 2022	978-4-80-001255-5	October 17, 2023	978-1-68579-616-7
10	August 8, 2023	978-4-80-001255-5	July 2, 2024	979-8-88843-784-1

=== Anime ===
An anime adaptation was announced in the fifth volume of the manga on October 10, 2019, later revealed as a television series on May 9, 2020. It was animated by Signal.MD and directed by Haruki Kasugamori, with Shiori Asuka and Su Shiyi designing the characters, and Kyōhei Matsuno composing the music. The series aired from April 4 to June 20, 2021, on Tokyo MX, ytv, and BS Fuji. Masayoshi Ōishi performed the series' opening theme song "Role-playing", while Non Stop Rabbit performed the series' ending theme song "Shizuka na Kaze". Funimation licensed the series. Following Sony's acquisition of Crunchyroll, the series was moved to Crunchyroll.

No.	Title (Note: All English titles are taken from Funimation.)	Directed by	Storyboarded by	Original release date
1	"A Hoard of Homes"; Transliteration: "Ironna Ie" (Japanese: いろんな家)	Haruki Kasugamori	Haruki Kasugamori, Signal.MD	April 4, 2021
Letty, an especially weak and timid young red dragon, is disowned by his father after getting one of his family's eggs stolen from under his nose by two Hunters. Thrust into the unknown outside, he decides to find himself a new, safe home. After escaping several hazardous encounters, he is directed to the abode of Diaria, a renowned elf architect, Demon Lord and real estate agent, who ends up saving him from a band of four overearger adventurers.
2	"A Home with Falls"; Transliteration: "Ochiru Ie" (Japanese: 落ちる家)	Haruki Kasugamori	Shiori Asaka, Natsumi Kuroda	April 11, 2021
After learning of Letty's desire for a new home, Diaria presents him with his first offers: An abandoned but trap-riddled temple, and a haunted mansion where Letty is exposed to a friendly but extremely spooky welcome by its undead inhabitants.
3	"My First Home"; Transliteration: "Hajimete no Ie" (Japanese: はじめての家)	Haruki Kasugamori	Su Shiyi, Nishiina Morita	April 18, 2021
On their way to the next estate, Diaria briefly stops at a cave inhabited by the Graiae Sisters, three witches who specialize in enchanted furniture. Finally, Diaria builds Letty a house, but shortly after its completion, Letty's new home is invaded by the four Heroes from before. His assigned guardians fight off the intruders, which results in a large influx of admirers looking for a safe refuge with Letty, thus driving him back onto the road in search for a quiet place to live in.
4	"A Cold Home"; Transliteration: "Tsumetai Ie" (Japanese: 冷たい家)	Haruki Kasugamori	Haruki Kasugamori, Signal.MD	April 25, 2021
To fulfill Letty's wish of living in an isolated spot, Diaria leads him to an arctic region. However, not only does surviving the harsh conditions prove difficult for the young dragon, he is also sent adrift on an ice floe, where he finds an egg, and swallowed by a whale. Inside the whale, he meets Davy Jones, who is living quite comfortably in the beast's belly. Determined to return the egg to its parents, Letty is helped out of the whale by Jones, but just as he meets up with Diaria, the egg hatches, and the chick inside it promptly imprints itself on him.
5	"A Community of Homes"; Transliteration: "Atsumatteru Ie" (Japanese: 集まってる家)	Shigeru Ueda	Haruki Kasugamori, Signal.MD	May 2, 2021
With a freshly hatched hræsvelgr chick on his claws, Letty is led by Diaria to a housing community where he hopes to leave it with a good surrogate family. However, since the suggested candidates prove themselves less than appealing, Diaria suggests that Letty raise the little one himself. When an aggressive catoblepas threatens to devour the chick, Letty discovers and acknowledges his paternal instincts, officially adopts the chick and names him "Pip".
6	"A Dragon in Trouble"; Transliteration: "Doragon, Kinkyū Jitai." (Japanese: ドラゴン、緊急事態。)	Toshiyuki Sone	Natsumi Kuroda, Yūka Fukuchi	May 9, 2021
Due to having to care for Pip, Letty's financial resources are drained, forcing him to take up a job. Diaria takes Letty to a multi-ethnic market community, where after several failed attempts, Letty is assigned to a proxy service suiting his nature as a dragon. Meanwhile, Diaria encounters Lilith, a succubus and an old acquaintance of his, and reminisces about the time he unwittingly - and unwillingly - became the new Dark Lord. While Diaria is off buying supplies for their journey, Letty is lured out of town and tricked into captivity.
7	"A Home for Fighting"; Transliteration: "Tatakau Ie" (Japanese: たたかう家)	Haruki Kasugamori	Nishiina Morita, Akane Tamai	May 16, 2021
Letty and Pip find themselves in a margrave's gladiatorial dungeon, where they encounter Steve, an orobas, and a lot of other monsters imprisoned, but living quite comfortably, to entertain the human masses in staged fights. However, their easy life comes to an end when the margrave abruptly dies and his oldest son and successor decides to have all the monster gladiators killed. Steve assigns Letty to a team tasked to distract the new margrave's mercenaries while the other monsters escape. They succeed, but nearly end up killed themselves until Diaria arrives to disable the mercenaries. After their successful flight, Letty and Diaria resume their home-hunting journey.
8	"Pip Goes on an Adventure"; Transliteration: "Pī-chan, Asobi ni Iku." (Japanese: ピーちゃん、遊びに行く。)	Shigeru Ueda	Natsumi Kuroda	May 23, 2021
Tired from travelling, Letty takes a nap. When Pip grows restless, Diaria encourages him to go out and explore, which ends with Pip aiding a pair of leprechauns in getting a new home. When Pip returns to the camp and Letty reacts overprotectively about his absence, Diaria tells the anxious dragon his own life story. When he was young, Diaria's thirst for knowledge caused him to accidentally damage the elves' hometree, Yggdrasil. His father sent him to study under Jormungandr; but when the great serpent repeatedly ended up destroying his hut with its careless playing around, it inspired Diaria to specialize in architecture. After his rise and brief tenure as the new Dark Lord, he made a fateful encounter with an ominous black dragon.
9	"A Home for a Black Dragon"; Transliteration: "Kuroi Ryū no Ie" (Japanese: 黒い竜の家)	Shigeru Ueda	Akane Tamai, Nishiina Morita, Natsumi Kuroda	May 30, 2021
As Diaria further relates, the black dragon, Varney, asked Diaria to help him find a new home with some encouragement from Jormungandr. After a few attempts with some Hero Guild fortresses, none of which were suitable for sheltering dragons, Diaria began studying the edificices' constructional properties as Varney wrecked them, gaining experience in analyzing and considering his clients' special requirements. In the course of these events, Diaria also discovered the limits of his previous learnings about how the world works, while Varney admitted that he longed for a safe home to finally raise a family. This new understanding compelled them both to continue their house-hunting journey together.
10	"Hunter Goes Dragon-Hunting"; Transliteration: "Hantā, Doragon o Ou." (Japanese: 狩人(ハンター)、ドラゴンを追う。)	Haruki Kasugamori	Akane Tamai	June 6, 2021
Since their first encounter with the young dragon, Huey and Albert, the two Hunters responsible for Letty's banishment, have become obsessed with hunting down and killing their chosen quarry. Backtracking his trail, they witness Letty (actually Diaria, kept out of sight by Letty's bulk) fire-blasting a bandit gang and decide to delay their dragon hunt for the time being. Among the bandits' loot, Letty and Diaria find a captive girl - the kingdom's spoiled princess Nell, who ran away from home. After an awkward introduction, Diaria offers to help her in her house-hunting, and after Letty wins her trust by saving her from an overzealous Hero party, Nell joins their quest.
11	"A Home for a Kingdom"; Transliteration: "Kokuei no Ie" (Japanese: 国営の家)	Shigeru Ueda	Nishiina Morita	June 13, 2021
As they travel, Letty, Diaria and Nell encounter Nashim, a jinn and tax counselor of the Non-Human Internal Revenue Service. With his exile, Letty is considered an independent and is required to turn in an annual tax report, making his need for a new home and steady income all the more urgent. Nell decides to let Pip choose their next destination, which turns out to be a Hero training dungeon beneath the kingdom's capital city. With the dungeon being closed on a "day off", Nell impulsively starts exploring it; she and Letty get lost, and in their efforts to find an exit, they end up within the halls of Nell's former home - the royal palace itself!
12	"A Well-Defended Home"; Transliteration: "Bōei Suru Ie" (Japanese: 防衛する家)	Haruki Kasugamori	Haruki Kasugamori, Kazuma Shirasaki	June 20, 2021
As Letty frantically tries to escape the castle, he is seen and the alarm is raised. Assuming that Letty has kidnapped his daughter and captured his castle, the king masses his army against the dreaded "Flame Dragon Lord". Much to Letty's growing consternation, Diaria and Nell decide to hole up for a siege, so he finally lures the king to Nell, leading them to reconcile and clear the misunderstanding. After being given some gifts by the king and princess, Letty, Diaria and Pip depart to continue their home-hunting quest, while Letty's "attack" on the castle goes down in legend.

== Reception ==
=== Previews ===
Anime News Network (ANN) had three editors review the first episode of the anime: Richard Eisenbeis was critical of the "meta-commentary" referencing RPG video games that's either a fourth wall breaking gag or implies technology is being used in its fantasy setting but was intrigued by how the house-hunting content will sustain a whole season; Caitlin Moore was initially positive during the opening minutes but criticized Letty for being an insufferable character, the repetitive humor and the "extremely limited" animation for making it a "pretty boring" viewing experience. She concluded that: "At the very least, it's gentle and harmless, unlikely to upset or offend even the most sensitive viewers." The third reviewer, Rebecca Silverman, praised it for being a good series prologue that contains humorous scenarios and designs that transfer from its source material into animation very well, concluding that: "This series stands to be a lot of fun, the fantasy and real estate mashup you didn't know you needed. I'm definitely looking forward to seeing more."

=== Series ===
Fellow ANN editor Mercedez Clewis reviewed the complete anime series and gave it an overall B grade. While finding criticism in the inconsistent comedy (highlighting the overuse of video game references), generic soundtrack and peripheral human side characters, she gave it praise for having a "well-acted and solidly directed" English dub with Michael Kovach and Steven Kelly as standouts, the chemistry between Letty and Diaria, and being a suitable gateway anime for younger audiences, concluding that: "In the end, Dragon Goes House-Hunting is easily one of the most underrated anime from the Spring season." Stig Høgset, writing for THEM Anime Reviews, wrote that: "Dragon Goes House-Hunting turned out to be a fun little journey in the world of reasonably tough love and diverse housing. It understands comedy well enough not to repeat the same joke three times, and, like I said, it's got some wonderfully snappy dialogue to its name. It has a colorful, wonderful world for Letty to discover as he goes from house to house on his lovely journey of discovery and homemaking, and if a second season is ever greenlit, I will be there."
