= Fena: Pirate Princess =

Japanese anime television series

- Promotional poster featuring Fena Houtman, the Samurai Seven, and Brule the dog

海賊王女 (Kaizoku Ōjo)
- Genre: Adventure; Alternate history; Fantasy
- Created by: Kazuto Nakazawa; Production I.G
- Anime television series
- Directed by: Kazuto Nakazawa (Note: Credited together under the collective contributions label ToyGerProject); Tetsuya Takahashi; Saki Fujii
- Produced by: Rui Kuroki
- Written by: Asako Kuboyama
- Music by: Yuki Kajiura
- Studio: Production I.G
- Licensed by: Crunchyroll
- Original network: MBS, Tokyo MX, BS Asahi, AT-X
- English network: SEA: Animax Asia; US: Adult Swim (Toonami)
- Original run: August 15, 2021 – October 24, 2021
- Episodes: 12
- icon

Fena: Pirate Princess (Japanese: 海賊王女, Hepburn: Kaizoku Ōjo) is a Japanese anime television series created and produced by Production I.G. A co-production between Crunchyroll and Adult Swim, the series aired on the latter's Toonami programming block from August to October 2021. A Japanese broadcast followed from October to December 2021. The story follows Fena Houtman, who seeks to unravel the mysteries of her family's past and a legendary treasure tied to the name "Eden".

== Plot ==
Ten years after surviving an attack on her family's ship, Fena Houtman washes ashore on the colonized island of Shangri-La. In the present, desperate to escape the island, Fena sells her virginity and enters an arranged marriage with Maxiver Jr., a volatile British soldier. Her escape plan falters, but she is saved by Otto and Salman, former knights of her family, and a group of hidden warriors that includes the samurai Yukimaru, who helped rescue Fena ten years ago. He knocks her out to ensure her safety as they flee from British soldiers and town guards. Fena, Otto, Salman, and a stray dog named Brule escape Shangri-La on a raft, landing on Goblin Island, home to a Japanese community led by Sanada Yukihisa. Sanada, whose ancestor was saved by the Houtmans, gives Fena a mysterious clear stone from her father, tied to his final voyage and the word "Eden". After cutting her hair and meeting the warriors who aided her escape, Fena receives a ship and Sanada's elite Goblin Knights to pursue the stone's secrets. Meanwhile, Royal Navy officer Abel hires pirate Grace O'Malley to hunt Fena.

Fena's crew, aboard the submersible Bonito II, stops at Bar-Baral for supplies. There, Fena, with warrior twins Kaede and Enju, uncovers a lead on another clear stone from Idar-Oberstein, Germany. Maxiver Jr., now leading pirates under Abel's command, ambushes them. Yukimaru is wounded protecting Fena, and Maxiver is captured and executed by Abel's orders. As the Bonito II sails to Germany, Fena struggles to learn combat. In Idar-Oberstein, the Burgomaster reveals the stone's French origin, its link to Joan of Arc's nickname, La Pucelle d'Orléans, and its purchase date of 1436, five years after her execution. Sailing to Orléans, Fena's crew explores a buried temple, where she experiences visions guiding them through catacombs to a glowing altar. O'Malley's crew, the Rumble Rose, ambushes them, demanding "coordinates to El Dorado" etched in Roman numerals on the stone. O'Malley kidnaps Fena, trapping the Goblin Knights in the catacombs. The Goblin Knights escape using gunpowder, but O'Malley delivers Fena to Abel on his ship, the Blue Giant. Abel, obsessed with a painting of Fena's mother, Helena, claims the Goblin Knights are using Fena to find Eden, where the legendary Kusanagi Sword is hidden. Yukimaru defies orders to rescue Fena alone, while O'Malley attacks the Blue Giant in revenge after Abel refuses payment. Abel destroys O'Malley's ship with a powerful cannon, triggering Fena's memories of the attack on her family's ship, orchestrated by the British. Yukimaru, wounded again by Abel, is saved by the Goblin Knights, who escape with Fena to Chaouen for medical aid.

In Chaouen, Goblin Knight Shitan blames Fena for Yukimaru's injuries, but they reconcile. Yukimaru recovers and vows to protect Fena, kissing her hand in a tender moment. Abel is haunted by memories of Helena, who was burned at the stake for eloping with Franz, Fena's father; Abel pursues Fena to fulfill Helena's wish to reunite in Eden. Fena's childhood song, "Vice Versa", combined with the stone's numerals, reveals coordinates to an uncharted island. There, the crew discovers a treasure-filled cave and a "lattice stage" where Fena's dance unlocks Eden's true entrance. Abel and the Royal Navy invade, and a battle erupts. Abel, delusional, sees Fena and Yukimaru as Helena and Franz, and wounds Yukimaru before collapsing. An entity, the Observer, reveals Fena as the "Maiden of Choosing", tasked with deciding whether to preserve or reset the world, losing her memories either way. Fena chooses, and the island collapses. Yukimaru awakens on a beach, finding an amnesiac Fena with an altered appearance. The Goblin Knights, carrying salvaged treasure, resolve to retrace Fena's journey to restore her memories. Yukimaru's confession of love sparks a partial memory recovery, suggesting he holds the key to her past.

== Characters ==
=== Protagonists ===
Fena Houtman (フェナ・ハウトマン, Fena Hautoman)
Voiced by: Asami Seto (Japanese); Brittany Cox, Courtney Chu^{Ep. 1 credits} (young) (English)
An 18-year-old, pale-skinned princess with white blonde hair who was set adrift ten years ago by a younger Yukimaru the day her father's ship was attacked. Upon arriving on the island of Shangri-La, she is taken in by some people of a brothel. She is nicknamed the "White Marginal" in Shangri-La because of her white skin and hair. She is a positive, cheerful orphan despite her traumatic past. Years later, Fena sold herself into a marriage to an ill-tempered, abusive British soldier named Maxiver Jr. in an attempt to steal the money to escape the island. Her plan failed until she was rescued by Salman, Otto, and the Samurai Seven including Yukimaru.
Brule (ブルール, Burūru)
Voiced by: Michael Sinterniklaas^{Ep. 8 credits}
A platinum white dog that lived on Shangri-La. When Fena was rescued from Maxiver Jr.'s men on Shangri-La, Brule followed Fena and has since become a companion to her and the Samurai Seven.

==== Samurai Seven ====
The Samurai Seven (サムライセブン, Samuraisebun) are a group of elite samurai that resides on Goblin Island, and Fena as her loyal pirate crew. They are the descendants of the Goblin Knights that decimated 3,000 Spanish soldiers at the Battle of Dunkirk and were "feared as the incarnation of Lucifer himself".

Yukimaru Sanada (真田雪丸, Sanada Yukimaru)
Voiced by: Ryōta Suzuki, Natsumi Kawaida (child)^{Ep. 1 credits} (Japanese); Robb Moreira, Jackson Greenspan^{Ep. 1 credits} (young) (English)
An introverted masked samurai and the leader of the Samurai Seven who helps to rescue Fena and works to keep her safe. Ten years ago when Yukimaru was a young boy, he helped to evacuate Fena during an attack by the Rumble Rose and the Royal Navy. He was later rescued by Kei, who trained him to be a samurai.
Shitan (紫檀)
Voiced by: Takahiro Sakurai, Makoto Koichi (child) (Japanese); Nicholas Corda (English)
A samurai who wields a bow and arrow, he is an elite warrior who can kill with his bow and arrow or his looks. While on the surface he may seem aloof, Shitan greatly values his friends.
Karin (花梨)
Voiced by: Aoi Yūki (Japanese); Anjali Kunapaneni (English)
A samurai who is the only female member of the group, she has a tendency to geek over different technologies and is shown to wield pistols and musket rifles where she possesses good marksmanship.
Enju (槐)
Voiced by: Gen Satō (Japanese); Brandon Winckler (English)
A samurai and Kaede's older twin brother who wields a spear and wakizashi. While they're both friendly and mischievous, Enju feels he's more dependable than his younger brother.
Kaede (楓)
Voiced by: Ryōta Ōsaka (Japanese); Darrel J. Delfin (English)
A samurai and Enju's younger twin brother who wields a spear and wakizashi. While they're both friendly and mischievous, Kaede feels he's more manly than his elder brother.
Tsubaki (椿)
Voiced by: Jun Oosuka (Japanese); Alan Lee (English)
A samurai who wields a short ninja sword, he is the oldest and most mature of the group, manages everyone's wild energy. Tsubaki is also an expert cook and once taught Fena how to make food associated with kobiru.
Makaba (真樺)
Voiced by: Shintarō Tanaka (Japanese); Thomas E. Wynn (English)
A samurai who fights with brass knuckles, he is the largest and strongest of the group. When he's not fighting, Makaba is kind-hearted and mild-mannered.

=== Antagonists ===
==== Rumble Rose ====
The Rumble Rose (ランブルローズ, Ranbururōzu) is a band of pirates led by O'Malley who are partially responsible for the attack on the ship ten years ago that led to the death of Fena's father. They also allied with Abel to partly obtain Fena for him and partly to get the coordinates to El Dorado. Each of its high-ranking female members have names similar to the famous female pirates and/or Navy members in history.

Grace O'Malley (グレース・オマリー, Gurēsu Omarī)
Voiced by: Rika Fukami^{Ep. 3 credits} (Japanese); Dawn M. Bennett^{Ep. 3 credits} (English)
The female captain of the Rumble Rose with red hair and an eyepatch over her closed right eye. Despite her beautiful appearance, she has a strong and arrogant personality that hates to lose. At the request of Abel Bluefield, Grace is aiming a party for Fena.
Ching Shih (チン・シー, Chin Shī)
Voiced by: Ai Kineta^{Ep. 5 credits} (Japanese); Marin Miller^{Ep. 5 credits} (English)
A high-ranking female member of the Rumble Rose, she is a staff member who is always calm and is also called O'Malley's right arm. Ching is good at physical attacks and has large sword wound on her left eye.
Charlotte Barry (シャーロット・バリー, Shārotto Barī)
Voiced by: Marina Yabūchi^{Ep. 3 credits} (Japanese); Courtney Shaw^{Ep. 3 credits} (English)
A high-ranking female member of the Rumble Rose with a rapier and being crescent sword user. She has a dark personality, contrary to her cute appearance. Charlotte is most adored by O'Malley among the sailors.
Mary Read (メアリ・リード, Meari Rīdo)
Voiced by: Ayaka Nanase^{Ep. 3 credits} (Japanese); Stephanie Sheh^{Ep. 3 credits} (English)
A high-ranking female member of the Rumble Rose, she is a mood maker and troublemaker for the crew, has a good physique, and has a bright and optimistic personality. Though her temper becomes rough during battle.
Hannah Snell (ハンナ・スネル, Han'na Suneru)
Voiced by: Hiyori Kono^{Ep. 3 credits} (Japanese); Sarah Anne Williams^{Ep. 3 credits} (English)
A high-ranking female member of the Rumble Rose. Although she is quite short, she has a high ability as a sniper, looks up to O'Malley, and wears an eyepatch over her left eye.
Artemisia (ヨモギ, Yomogi)
Voiced by: Kaoru Marimura^{Ep. 5 credits} (Japanese); Erika Ishii^{Ep. 5 credits} (English)
A high-ranking female member of the Rumble Rose. She has a dignified and neat appearance, but her pride is high and she is vicious, and fights mightily with a dagger.
Anne Bonnie (アン・ボニー, An Bonī)
Voiced by: Saiko Moriya^{Ep. 3 credits} (Japanese); Laura Post^{Ep. 3 credits} (English)
A high-ranking female member of the Rumble Rose, she has a muscular body and great strength. Anne's fighting style is war-like, but she is reliable in the crew. She wields a war hammer.
Alvida (アルビダ, Arubida)
Voiced by: Mari Hino^{Ep. 5 credits} (Japanese); Rachel Slotky^{Ep. 5 credits} (English)
A high-ranking female member of the Rumble Rose, she is very slender and has a mysterious atmosphere. Alvida is also good at outsmarting cowardly opponents.

==== Royal Navy ====
A branch of the British Empire's military and is one of the factions after Fena ever since they were partially responsible for the attack on the ship ten years ago that led to the death of Fena's father. Among its known personnel are:

Abel Bluefield (アベル・ブルーフィールド, Aberu Burūfīrudo)
Voiced by: Toshiyuki Morikawa, Miho Okasaki (child)^{Ep. 9 credits} (Japanese); Ryan Nicolls^{Ep. 3 credits} (English)
A mysterious lord who is after Fena for his own reasons and searches for her on his ship called the Blue Giant. One of them is that he fell in love with Fena's late mother Helena and knows what her family can do. He allies with the Rumble Rose to find Fena.
Cody (コーディ, Kōdi)
Voiced by: Yukine Yaehata (Japanese); Casey Mongillo^{Ep. 3 credits} (English)
Abel's subordinate, he was originally a slave on Shangri-La before being rescued by Abel. Since then, Cody has been loyal to Abel.
Captain (キャプテン, Kyaputen)
Voiced by: Michael Sorich^{Ep. 7 credits}
The unnamed captain of the Blue Giant who is loyal to Abel.

=== Supporting characters ===
Salman (サルマン, Saruman)
Voiced by: Manabu Muraji (Japanese); Frank Todaro (English)
An older knight who helps to rescue Fena from her fate. He was once nicknamed "Salman the Onslaught" for having killed his enemies with a spear and knew Fena when she was a little girl.
Otto (オットー, Ottō)
Voiced by: Hiroaki Hirata (Japanese); Doug Stone (English)
An older knight who helps to rescue Fena from her fate. He was once nicknamed "Otto the Blitz" for his quick swordplay and knew Fena when she was a little girl.
Yukihisa Sanada (真田雪橋, Sanada Yuki-bashi)
Voiced by: Hōchū Ōtsuka^{Ep. 2 credits} (Japanese); Scottie Ray^{Ep. 2 credits} (English)
The leader of a Japanese community on Goblin Island and Shitan's uncle, he is the one that provides the Samurai Seven to Fena in her quest and even gave Fena a stone that her father wanted her to have. Though he later sent a message to the Samurai Seven to leave Fena once she has served her purpose as he sends Kei to recover Fena.
Kei (ケイ)
Voiced by: Kōji Yusa^{Ep. 5 credits} (Japanese); Keith Silverstein^{Ep. 5 credits} (English)
A samurai and Shitan's older brother who was responsible for rescuing Yukimaru and training him. Kei has become like a brother figure to him. Sanada later dispatched Kei to recover Fena.

=== Other characters ===
Franz Houtman (フランツ・ハウトマン, Furantsu Hautoman)
Voiced by: Kazuhiro Nakaya (Japanese); Michael Sinterniklaas^{Ep. 1 credits} (English)
A noble Dutchman who was the head of the Houtman family and had ties to Eden. He pretended to be a butler of the king of England to help Helena to fulfill her task: to seduce the king to make the new La Pucelle/maiden. After that, Franz eloped with Helena and raised Fena as his adoptive daughter. He was killed during a raid by the Rumble Rose and British Army. Before dying and helping a younger Fena set her adrift in a lifeboat, he told her to find "Eden".
Angie (アンジー, Anjī)
Voiced by: Saori Takamiya^{Ep. 1 credits} (Japanese); Zoey Martin^{Ep. 1 credits} (English)
A prostitute residing on Shangri-La. She is a co-worker and friend of Fena. Fena has shown her multiple times her escape plans over the years. Angie had a crush on Abel, which she flustered every time she seeing him. However, after learning of Abel's obsession with his past, she decided helping Fena to find Eden.
Helena des Armoises (ヘレナ, Herena)
Voiced by: Maaya Sakamoto^{Ep. 9 credits} (Japanese); Xanthe Huynh^{Ep. 9 credits} (English)
A noble Frenchwoman who was a former maiden, a descendant of Joan of Arc, and the mother of Fena. She was the old childhood friend and lover of Abel. She had blue eyes and had platinum blond ankle-length hair. She came to England on a mission to seduce the king and to produce the new La Pucelle. Together with Franz, who pretended to be the king's butler to aid Helena's task, Helena ran away to a safer country.

== Production and release ==
The series was directed by Kazuto Nakazawa, Tetsuya Takahashi, and Saki Fujii. Asako Kuboyama penned the series' scripts, while Yuki Kajiura composed the music. The opening theme song is "Umi to Shinju" (海と真珠; lit. "The Sea and a Pearl") performed by Junna, while the ending theme song is "Saihate" (サイハテ; lit. "The Farthest Shore") performed by Minori Suzuki.

The English dub aired on Adult Swim's Toonami programming block while simultaneously launching for streaming in Japanese with English subtitles on Crunchyroll, from August 15 to October 24, 2021; the first two episodes premiered back-to-back. (Note: Adult Swim listed the series premiere on August 14, 2021, at 12:00 a.m. (24:00) EDT/PDT, which is effectively August 15. The English sub launched simultaneously on Crunchyroll.) In Japan, the series aired from October 3 to December 19, 2021, on MBS, Tokyo MX, BS Asahi, and AT-X. (Note: MBS listed the series premiere on October 2, 2021, at 26:38, which is effectively October 3 at 2:38 a.m. JST.) In Southeast Asia, the series premiered on May 2, 2022, on Animax.

On September 28, 2022, Jason DeMarco, senior vice president of action and anime programming for Adult Swim, confirmed that the series was written off by Warner Bros. Discovery after it had been removed from Adult Swim's website.

=== Episodes ===
Note: All episodes were storyboarded by Kazuto Nakazawa.

No.	Title (Note: English translated titles are taken from Adult Swim and Crunchyroll)	Directed by	Animation directed by	English air date	Japanese air date
1	"Memories"; Transliteration: "Kioku" (Japanese: 記憶)	Tetsuya Takahashi	Kazuto Nakazawa & Yasuko Takahashi	August 15, 2021	October 3, 2021
Ten years ago, Fena Houtman washed ashore on the colonized island of Shangri-La after her family's ship was attacked in the dead of night and was saved by a boy named Yukimaru. In the present day, Fena sold her virginity and was put in an arranged marriage to an ill-tempered British soldier named Maxiver Jr. in an attempt to escape the island with the money. That evening, after her plans hit a snag, she is saved by Otto and Salman, two senior knights who used to serve her family. Despite being hunted down by British soldiers and the town guards, Fena is saved by a small group of hidden warriors, including a samurai with eyes she recognizes as that of Yukimaru's, before he knocks her out cold with his sheath.
2	"An Inherited Journey"; Transliteration: "Uketsugu Tabi" (Japanese: 受け継ぐ旅)	Tomomi Takeuchi	Mai Fukuhara, Marumi Sugita & Tomomi Takeuchi	August 15, 2021	October 10, 2021
Fena, Otto, and Salman escape Shangri-La on a small raft with a dog that followed Fena named Brule. They soon dock at Goblin Island, home to a small Japanese community led by Sanada Yukihisa, who swore to protect the Houtman family after they rescued his shipwrecked great-grandfather from near death ages ago and gave his crew the knowledge on how to survive on the island. Sanada gives Fena a small, clear stone, and is told that her father wanted her to have it before he risked his life on his final voyage. After taking a tour around the island, meeting the warriors who aided in her escape, and relaxing in one of their baths, Fena cuts her hair and remembers the last word her father told her "Eden". The following day, Sanada provides Fena with a ship and his elite group of warriors to protect her as they voyage away to unlock the mystery of the clear stone and the meaning behind "Eden".
3	"Bar-Baral"; Transliteration: "Baru-Bararu" (Japanese: バルバラル)	Kazuki Yokoyama	Hisako Shimotsuma, Mayu Gushiken & Haruka Sanefuji	August 22, 2021	October 17, 2021
A high-ranking Royal Navy officer named Abel enlists the help of Grace O'Malley to look for Fena. Meanwhile, Fena and her crew's submersible ship (Bonito II) docks at the free island of Bar-Baral so that they can get food and supplies for their journey. Fena and the warrior twins Kaede and Enju get some new clothes and find a lead on another separate clear stone that was discovered to have come from Idar-Oberstein in Germany. Suddenly, the three are ambushed by Maxiver Jr. who is now leading a crew of hired pirates and mercenaries lent to him by the British soldier Abel to capture her. The twins and Yukimaru manage to fend off their attackers, although Yukimaru gets hit by a musket ball while escaping with Fena. Being back out on the water, Tsubaki scolds Fena and the twins for their irresponsible actions. Later that night, a chained Maxiver Jr. is about to be thrown overboard to his doom as Cody states that his services are no longer required by Abel.
4	"The Mystery of the Stone"; Transliteration: "Ishi no Nazo" (Japanese: 石の謎)	Kazuto Nakazawa & Saki Fujii	Tomomi Kakutani, Minoru Ueta & Mayu Gushiken	August 29, 2021	October 24, 2021
As the Bonito II sails to the German village of Idar-Oberstein, Fena tries to get her protectors to teach her how to fight, but with little success. Upon arriving in the village, they meet a woman named Arya, who takes them to see her grandfather, the Burgomaster. In exchange for Yukimaru sharpening his knife, the Burgomaster offers to help them find the origin of the stone. He tells them that the stone actually came to the village from somewhere in France, but the buyer was listed as La Pucelle d'Orléans, the nickname given to Joan of Arc. However, the listed date of purchase was in 1436, five years after she was burned at the stake, adding to the mystery of the stone. As Fena's crew leave the village, Fena recalls someone mentioning the name "La Pucelle" to her as young child. Meanwhile, Abel grimaces over a painting he calls "La Pucelle" as he continues pursuing Fena.
5	"Coordinates"; Transliteration: "Zahyō" (Japanese: 座標)	Ken'ichi Matsuzawa	Tomomi Takeuchi, Kazuchika Kise, Yūji Miyashita & Minoru Ueta	September 5, 2021	October 31, 2021
Sanada speaks to Kei about the day he rescued Yukimura. Meanwhile, Shitan receives a message via carrier pigeon as the Bonito II sails to Orléans. Fena and her crew reach a hollowed out dig site and enter a buried and abandoned temple. Fena starts getting mysterious visions as she leads her crew through winding catacombs below the temple, unaware that the Rumble Rose is following from behind. Fena's group soon reach a glowing altar with a space that fits the clear stone, and try to find the next clue. Fena wanders off to what appears to be the grave of Joan of Arc. She is then grabbed by Ching of the Rumble Rose. Just as the samurai uncover some Roman numerals etched onto the stone, O'Malley and her crew appear with Fena at sword point, forcing them to give up what O'Malley calls the "coordinates to El Dorado." Karin reluctantly gives them her paper with the numbers, but O'Malley kicks Karin and drags Fena away with her own crew before blowing up the entrance to the catacombs with the Goblin Knights inside. Tsubaki and Brule are awoken by the explosion while waiting on the Bonito II.
6	"Mutiny on the Blue Giant"; Transliteration: "Konran no Aoi Fune" (Japanese: 混乱の蒼い船)	Tetsuya Takahashi	Mai Fukuhara, Hisako Shimotsuma, Kumiko Numata, Eri Yamazaki, Yasuko Takahashi & Ai Watanabe	September 12, 2021	November 7, 2021
The Goblin Knights find some unexploded gunpowder and use it to blast their way out. Meanwhile, O'Malley delivers Fena to Abel on his ship the Blue Giant, but Abel refuses to pay her after noticing the cut that Ching left on Fena's neck. After O'Malley leaves, Abel tells Fena that he knew her mother and that the Goblin Knights were just using her. On the Bonito II, Shitan tells the others that the only reason Sanada has been serving the Houtman family was to find the location of Eden where the Kusanagi Sword, one of the legendary Three Sacred Treasures of Japan, is supposedly kept. Furthermore, Shitan tells the crew that Kei is coming personally to recover Fena, and they must return to Goblin Island or risk being branded as traitors. Despite this warning, Yukimaru decides to rescue Fena on his own. Back on the Blue Giant after Fena and Cody have a conversation, a furious O'Malley confronts Fena. Abel stops O'Malley before she can take Fena off the ship. O'Malley reluctantly returns to her own ship, but decides to attack in revenge. Abel reveals to Fena the portrait of a woman named Helena that turns out to be Fena's mother.
7	"The Burning Sea"; Transliteration: "Moeru Umi" (Japanese: 燃える海)	Itsurō Kawasaki	Sara Moroyuki	September 19, 2021	November 14, 2021
Abel describes to Fena that the portrait of Helena was made by him and is lacking some colors to make it complete. As the Bonito II surfaces, the crew all decide to chase after Yukimaru and rescue Fena with him. Meanwhile, the Rumble Rose begins its attack run on the Blue Giant. Abel decides to test the "Wellington Cannon" that was supposed to be used during a siege on them, blowing up the entire pirate ship and its crew in one shot. Yukimaru rows by the wreckage and the dead bodies of the unnamed members. Fena suffers from shellshock, the burning wreckage and the British sailors reminding her of the attack on her father's ship ten years ago which the British Royal Army was also involved in. As the Captain of the Blue Giant demands she be thrown in the brig, Fena cries out for Yukimaru who arrives in time to start attacking the sailors, but he is shot twice by Abel's tri-barrel gun. Yukimaru recognizes Abel from the attack on Franz's ship as he collapses from his wounds. Suddenly, the rest of the Goblin Knights arrive and manage to escape the Blue Giant with Fena and Yukimaru, but both are unconscious as the group retreats to the Bonito II.
8	"A Knight's Vow"; Transliteration: "Kishi no Chikai" (Japanese: 騎士の誓い)	Tomomi Takeuchi	Mai Fukuhara, Tomomi Takeuchi, Shūichi Hara & Shiki Amō	September 26, 2021	November 21, 2021
The Bonito II rushes to port at Chaouen, making it just in time to get Yukimaru to a doctor they know. While Yukimaru recovers, Shitan calls Fena a witch for her role in nearly getting Yukimaru killed twice in a span of ten years. Shitan reminisces over his past about him watching over Yukimaru when he was just saved, Kei making negative comments about his sword fighting, and how he picked up the bow. With Brule by her side, Fena later manages to reconcile with him. Eventually, Yukimaru wakes up. Afterwards, he and Fena have a conversation on the roof and she confides in him that she is confused of who she is and is afraid of moving forward. Yukimaru tries to assure Fena and he swears that he will protect her and keep her safe. He then kisses her hand, much to her surprise. Elsewhere, Abel is painting a portrait of a still life of a bowl of fruit with Helena's portrait behind him and promises her that they will meet again soon.
9	"Vice Versa"; Transliteration: "Vaisu Vāsa" (Japanese: ヴァイスヴァーサ)	Tetsuya Takahashi	Ai Watanabe, Hisako Shimotsuma, Mayu Gushiken & Kumiko Numata	October 3, 2021	November 28, 2021
Abel breaks down sobbing as he remembers his past with Helena, how she had gotten pregnant with the king's daughter, then ran away and eloped with the king's butler Franz while carrying the king's daughter, and how she was sentenced to death for the act. Helena told Abel about her wish to return to Eden, offering Abel a chance to reunite with her if he somehow came across her daughter. The next day, Helena was burned at the stake. Meanwhile in the present, Fena begins humming an old tune and Yukimaru remembers the lyrics of her "secret song". Fena realizes the lyrics have matched closely with her travels thus far, but in reverse. Realizing the song title "Vice Versa" is another clue itself, Fena and Yukimaru combine the song with the Roman numerals found etched into the stone and uncover the coordinates to what might be Eden.
10	"The Curtain Rises on the Climax"; Transliteration: "Kakyoku no Makuake" (Japanese: 佳局の幕開け)	Itsurō Kawasaki	Mai Fukuhara, Hisako Shimotsuma, Kumiko Numata, Yasuko Takahashi & Ai Watanabe	October 10, 2021	December 5, 2021
Fena and her crew sail out to the coordinates, where they come across an uncharted island rising out of the ocean. Meanwhile, an operative of the Royal Nave informs Cody the news of Fena's travels. Abel instructs the captain of the Blue Giant to head to the coordinates in question. The twins uncover a cave behind a waterfall and follow the path to a giant room full of treasure from across the world. However, Fena questions if this treasure was the Eden her father died for. Shitan walks into another room where he uncovers the name Yasuke on a doorway. Fena wanders off with Yukimaru to a different room where they find a "lattice stage" with "Initium" written in the center. After removing her boots, Fena begins dancing on the stage and triggers a mechanism revealing the true entrance to Eden. The Blue Giant arrives at the island as Abel and several Royal Navy troops rush to the cave.
11	"At Mission's End"; Transliteration: "Shimei no Hate ni" (Japanese: 使命の果てに)	Kazuchika Kise	Kazuchika Kise	October 17, 2021	December 12, 2021
As Fena and Yukimaru find their way to a desiccated ark, Shitan finds a chest supposedly containing the Kusanagi sword when the rest of the Goblin Knights notice that Fena and Yukimaru are missing. Suddenly, Abel arrives at the entrance to the treasure room with the Royal Navy unit behind him. When the Blue Giant's Captain rushes to grab the treasure, Abel shoots him in the back which serves as a warning to anyone who gets "blinded by treasure". The Goblin Knights and sailors begin fighting each other as Abel slips away to find the true entrance to Eden. Abel finds Yukimaru and Fena, but has delusions of them as Helena and Franz. Yukimaru cuts off Abel's shooting arm, but gets stabbed in the chest for standing in his way once again. Suddenly, an image of Helena appears behind Abel and he imagines himself ascending to Heaven as he collapses from blood loss. As Abel and Helena both disappear, Franz appears before Fena and then changes into Cody's form as this person calls itself an "Observer" of her story.
12	"The Chosen Maiden"; Transliteration: "Sentaku no Miko" (Japanese: 選択の巫女)	Tetsuya Takahashi & Saki Fujii	Kazuto Nakazawa & Yasuko Takahashi	October 24, 2021	December 19, 2021
The Observer switches repeatedly between Franz and Cody's forms as it tells Fena that she is the "Maiden of Choosing" who must choose between letting the world continue as it is, or resetting it with only herself and a few other "pure souls". In either case, her memories will be wiped to save her from the burden of her choice. As the island begins to collapse on itself, Fena believes in the words of her friends and makes her decision with her hair becoming long and black. Yukimaru meets with her in Eden one last time before she disappears, swearing to find her again. Suddenly, Yukimaru wakes up on a beach where an amnesiac Fena is standing in the water where her hair has become long and dark. The Goblin Knights then appear with their ship and whatever treasure they could carry. The crew decide to take Fena on a journey to retrace her steps and hopefully restore her memories. Kei receives the legendary sword from Shitan, Fena reunites with Salman, Otto, and Angie, walks by Charlotte, Mary, and Hannah, and sees two kids resembling Abel and Helena. While they are alone, Yukimaru confesses his love for Fena, which suddenly triggering some of her lost memories is partially return indicating Yukimaru is the only one who can restore her memories.

== Reception ==
The series received a mixed reception. Rafael Motomayor, writing for IGN, gave it a 7 out of 10, praising the high production values and quality of animation, but criticizing the poor writing and convoluted ending. Hilary Leung, writing for CBR, also praised the animation quality and setup, noting that "the character designs, animation style and plot are highly reminiscent of anime from the '90s to early '00s, hitting all the right nostalgic notes for fans of that era", but was less impressed by the inconsistent tones and pacing of the series.
