= Ryoko Kui =

Japanese manga artist

Ryoko Kui 九井諒子
- Area: Manga artist
- Notable works: Delicious in Dungeon; Terrarium in a Drawer

Ryoko Kui (九井諒子, Kui Ryōko) is a Japanese manga artist. She is best known for her manga series Delicious in Dungeon (2014–2023), serialized in Enterbrain's seinen manga magazine Harta, as well as her work Terrarium in a Drawer, winning the Excellence Award in the Manga Division at the 17th Japan Media Arts Festival.

== Biography ==
Kui posted her early works on Pixiv and COMITIA before making her official debut as a manga artist in March 2011 with her short story collection The Dragon's School is on Top of the Mountain: Ryoko Kui Short Story Collection (竜の学校は山の上 九井諒子作品集, Ryū no gakkō wa Yamanoue Kui Ryōko Sakuhin-shū). Prior to this, she published a webcomic on her personal blog named UORIR: Amble (UORIR: アンブル編, UORIR: Anburu-hen) which ran from 2008–2012.

In 2013, Kui won the Excellence Award in the Manga Division at the 17th Japan Media Arts Festival for her work Terrarium in a Drawer. Her 2014 work, Delicious in Dungeon was published in the magazine Harta and received the 2015 Comic Natalie award, the 2016 Kono Manga ga Sugoi!, the 2016 Kono Manga wo Yome!, and the 2016 Zenkoku-sho Ten'in ga Eranda Osusume Komikku. Delicious in Dungeon received an anime adaptation in 2024, with Kui noted as being "very involved" with its production.

An exhibition of Kui's works, including art from Delicious in Dungeon, The Dragon's School is on Top of the Mountain, Seven Little Sons of the Dragon, and Terrarium in a Drawer, debuted in Tokyo in 2024 and has since been displayed across Japan in Kyoto, Osaka, Fukuoka, and Kumamoto. In 2025 between October 10th to 26th the exhibit was displayed in New York at the Chelsea Walls art gallery. The exhibit featured original sketches and manga panels from her series, comments from Kui and her editors regarding the production process, and replications of the dishes made in Delicious in Dungeon.

== Style ==
Kui's style is noted for its portrayal of reality and fantasy with her unique point of view. Megumi Sakamoto writing for Comic Natalie described her characteristic style as embodying "unnaturalness" (違和感). Kui was noted in an interview with Comic Natalie to have an affinity with dragons, and has had dragons featured in several of her works.

Prior to Delicious in Dungeon, Kui read The Neverending Story and The Lord of the Rings, as well as researching the rulebooks of Dungeons & Dragons after having seen it arise several times for her research prior to the manga's serialization. Kui is a noted fan of computer role-playing games, having previously drawn fan art for Baldur's Gate, Baldur's Gate II: Shadows of Amn, Baldur's Gate 3, Pathfinder: Kingmaker, Pathfinder: Wrath of the Righteous, and Planescape: Torment. As a child, she observed her father play Wizardry on the Famicom, as well as Dragon Quest, Ultima, and Fire Emblem. Kui cited Wizardry VI: Bane of the Cosmic Forge as one of the primary inspirations for Delicious in Dungeon.

== Bibliography ==
=== Manga ===
- The Dragon's School is on Top of the Mountain: Ryoko Kui Short Story Collection (竜の学校は山の上 九井諒子作品集, Ryuu no Gakkou wa Yama no Ue Kui Ryōko Sakuhin-shū), March 30, 2011, ISBN 978-4-78-160545-6
- Seven Little Sons of the Dragon: A Collection of Seven Stories (九井諒子作品集 竜のかわいい七つの子, Kui Ryōko Sakuhin-shū Ryū no Kawaii Nanatsu no Ko; lit. 'Collection of Works by Ryoko Kui: Seven Cute Children of the Dragon'), October 15, 2012, ISBN 978-4-04-728408-1
- Terrarium in a Drawer (ひきだしにテラリウム, Hikidashi ni Terrarium), March 27, 2013, ISBN 978-4-78-160948-5
- Delicious in Dungeon (ダンジョン飯, Danjon Meshi), 2014–2023

=== Art books ===
- Daydream Hour, in Harta Vol. 37, August 12, 2016, ISBN 978-4-04-734124-1
- Daydream Hour 2, in Harta Vol. 41, August 15, 2017, ISBN 978-4-04-734128-9
- Daydream Hour 3, in Harta Vol. 74, May 15, 2020, ISBN 978-4-04-736121-8
- Daydream Hour 4, in Harta Vol. 81, February 15, 2021, ISBN 978-4-04-736128-7
- Daydream Hour 5, in Harta Vol. 96, August 12, 2022, ISBN 978-4-04-737056-2
- Doodles by Ryoko Kui: Daydream Hour (九井諒子ラクガキ本 デイドリーム・アワー, Ryoko Kui Rakugaki Hon Daydream Hour), January 15, 2024, ISBN 978-4-04-737646-5
