= AFK Arena =

2019 video game

- App icon, featuring two playable characters, (Left to right) Lailah and Elijah
- Developer: Lilith Games
- Publisher: Lilith Games
- Engine: Cocos2d
- Platforms: iOS; Android
- Release: April 2019
- Genre: Role-playing video game
- Modes: Single-player, multiplayer

AFK Arena is a free-to-play role-playing video game developed and published by Lilith Games. It was released in April 2019 for the iOS and Android. Set in the fictional world of Esperia, players collect and upgrade a variety of heroes to form a team and take part in various game modes.

The game was followed by a sequel, AFK Journey, in March 2024.

== Plot ==
Esperia consists of 49 regions. These regions continue to expand as new territories are uncovered. Throughout the realm, various towns and kingdoms are nestled within their respective regions. Currently, the land faces the looming threat of the malevolent Hypogean forces, led by Annih, the God of Death, who has breached the sealed Barred Gate.

"Dura", a mysterious figure whose origins are shrouded in secrecy, plays a central role in the game's universe. She is depicted as an enigmatic deity, revered by many inhabitants of the game's world, often associated with concepts of balance, creation, and power. Throughout the game's narrative, players uncover fragments of her history and her influence on the world.

== Gameplay ==
AFK Arena is based around the away from keyboard gameplay, where the players continue to obtain resources and experience points, even when they are not actively playing. All battles in the game unfold automatically with a selected team of five heroes based on a preset order, although the players can manually trigger the special skills. Strategical positioning on the battlefield is important, as there are combat buffs depending on hero faction, and certain heroes excel in specific positions.

Heroes can be upgraded and enhanced through leveling up, equipping gear and artifacts or strengthening their signature items. Each of them belong to one of the eight factions (Lightbearers, Maulers, Wilders, Graveborn, Celestials, Hypogeans, Dimensionals, and Draconis) and are further distinguished with a Class, Type, and Role of their own, each with its backstory, strengths, and weaknesses. New characters can be acquired through a gacha system, which requires in-game currency or microtransactions.

The main storyline is divided up into increasingly more difficult chapters. Other game modes in AFK Arena include: Bounty Board (selected heroes can complete offline timed requests for rewards), King’s Tower (ascending a tower filled with increasingly difficult enemies on every floor), Arcane Labyrinth (using relics to advance) and Arena of Heroes (PvP competition against other teams for rankings and rewards). The players can also form guilds filled with other players, allowing them to collaborate on missions and participate in guild events.

== Reception ==
By June 2019, AFK Arena had reached 6.6 million players. The game has been downloaded more than 45 million times and has grossed almost $1 billion in all-time revenue.
