= AFK Journey =

2024 video game

- Developer: Lilith Games
- Publisher: Farlight Games
- Platforms: iOS; Android; Windows
- Release: EU/NA: March 27, 2024; AS: August 8, 2024
- Genre: Role-playing
- Mode: Multiplayer

AFK Journey is a fantasy role-playing video game developed by Lilith Games. Released on March 27, 2024, for Windows, Android, and iOS, it serves as the sequel to the idle role-playing game AFK Arena. The game adopts a free-to-play model, complemented by a gacha system that allows players to collect and upgrade characters.

Set in the land of Esperia, the story revolves around Merlin, a powerful mage who has lost their memories. Embarking on a journey with an assembled team of heroes, they'll uncover the secrets of Esperia while restoring Merlin's forgotten past.

== Gameplay ==
AFK Journey retains the idle mechanics from AFK Arena, allowing players to earn resources over time depending on their current AFK progress level, which is increased by completing battle stages. The hero and equipment levels are both shared across the entire roster.

The combat unfolds automatically on a tile board, where the heroes are strategically positioned before the start. With six distinct classes — Tank, Warrior, Marksman, Mage, Rogue, and Support — each hero brings different skills and abilities. The players can manually cast each hero's Ultimate ability, slowing down the action until the move is made, or can be set to automatic. During battles, the players can utilize environmental mechanisms like flamethrowers and landmines, as well as the terrain itself, to gain a tactical edge over the enemies.

All heroes can be strengthened either by increasing their resonance or by ascending them to higher tiers, such as Supreme+ or Paragon. Depending on the ascension requirements of their number of copies, heroes can be A-level or S-level. They are obtained through a gacha system, which utilizes in-game currencies. These currencies can be earned by participating in events or purchased directly within the game.

AFK Journey features an open world with several regions to explore. Various puzzles scattered across the map give rewards upon completion, while teleportation points allow for fast travel.

In addition to main and side quests, the game has several separate modes, including: Dream Realm (daily boss challenges with varying difficulty levels), Arena (PvP battles against other players to climb the ranks), Supreme Arena (A ranked PvP system that consist of three battles for each player.), Legend Trial: (ascending a tower using heroes from a specific faction, with difficulty increasing on each floor), Honor Duel (PvP mode with a randomized artifact and initial formation), Arcane Labyrinth (roguelike mode with the goal of clearing the stages) and Battle Drills (following a route along with guild members to defeat the final boss). The players can also form or join guilds, collaborating with others to tackle guild events.

A new season in AFK Journey begins every four months, each introducing a new storyline and themed events. The first narrative story, known as the Starter Story, is followed by eight distinct seasons: Song of Strife, Waves of Intrigue, Chains of Eternity, Echoes of Dissent, Thorns of Devotion, Tower of Memory, Crown of Ashes and Veil of Memories.

== Plot ==
AFK Journey is set in Esperia, a continent full of magic. Long ago, the seed of life drifted from the stars and took root, giving birth to a land of wonder. However, as gods fell during a chaotic war, six great factions (Lightbearers, Wilders, Maulers, Graveborns, Celestials and Hypogeans) emerged, each vying for power and dominance. The players assume the role of Merlin, a legendary mage who has temporarily lost their memories, who will uncover Esperia's secrets by guiding a band of heroes on a quest to pull "the sword from the stone".

== Development ==
The project began in May 2021, with much of the development team transitioning from AFK Arena. Their vision was to "redefine the card-based genre by creating a vast world that offers new and immersive experiences for players," envisioning a game that could last 10 years. The art style draws inspiration from the intricate look of church stained-glass, characterized by bold color blocks, striking contrasts, and distinct outlines.

After 16 months of development, the team ran several small closed tests in the UK, Canada, Australia, Indonesia, and the Philippines. In April 2023, AFK Journey entered open beta. The game was officially launched outside of Asia in March 2024. In August 2024, it was released worldwide.

== Reception ==
Pocket Gamer described it as "an engaging mobile RPG that boasts enthralling storybook-style graphics and a simplistic yet fulfilling combat system." Meanwhile, Noah Cochrane at GameTyrant lauded "the attention to detail in each character's appearance" as "remarkable," adding that "the environments are beautifully crafted, with vibrant colors and stunning visual effects that bring the game world to life."

By September 2024, about six months after release, AFK Journey reached $158.3 million in revenue. After debuting in Asia on August 8, 2024, daily revenue peaked at $3.36 million on August 11. By December 2024, the game exceeded 15 million total downloads.

=== Accolades ===
| Year | Awards | Category | Result | Ref. |
|---|---|---|---|---|
| 2024 | The Game Awards 2024 | Best Mobile Game | Nominated | |
| 2024 | Google Play Best of 2024 | iPhone Game of the Year | Won | |
| 2024 | App Store Awards | Best Game | Won | |
| 2025 | 16th Hollywood Music in Media Awards | Song/Score – Mobile Video Game | Won | |
