= Nora to Zassō =

Japanese manga series

- First tankōbon volume cover

ノラと雑草
- Manga
- Written by: Keigo Shinzō
- Published by: Kodansha
- Magazine: Monthly Morning Two
- Original run: April 21, 2018 – August 21, 2020
- Volumes: 4
- icon

Nora to Zassō (ノラと雑草; "The Stray and The Weeds") is a Japanese manga series written and illustrated by Keigo Shinzō. It was serialized in Kodansha's seinen manga magazine Monthly Morning Two from April 2018 to August 2020, with its chapters collected in four tankōbon volumes.

== Publication ==
Written and illustrated by Keigo Shinzō, Nora to Zassō started in Kodansha's seinen manga magazine Monthly Morning Two on April 21, 2018. Shinzō was hospitalized and underwent treatment for lymphoma in April 2020, putting the manga on a short hiatus (Shinzō announced that his lymphoma was in full remission in November of the same year). The manga finished on August 21, 2020. Kodansha collected its chapters in four tankōbon volumes, released from November 22, 2018, to October 23, 2020.

=== Volumes ===
No.	Japanese release date	Japanese ISBN
1	November 22, 2018	978-4-06-513608-9
2	June 21, 2019	978-4-06-516110-4
3	January 23, 2020	978-4-06-518258-1
4	October 23, 2020	978-4-06-521075-8

== Reception ==
Nora to Zassō was nominated for the French 14th ACBD's Prix Asie de la Critique 2020. The manga was nominated for the Best Comic Award at the 48th Angoulême International Comics Festival 2021.

== See also ==
- Tokyo Alien Bros., another manga series by the same author
- Hirayasumi, another manga series by the same author
