= Hirayasumi =

Japanese manga series by Keigo Shinzō

- First tankōbon volume cover, featuring Natsumi Kobayashi (left) and Hiroto Ikuta (right)

ひらやすみ
- Genre: Drama; Iyashikei
- Manga
- Written by: Keigo Shinzō
- Published by: Shogakukan
- English publisher: NA: Viz Media
- Imprint: Big Spirit Comics
- Magazine: Weekly Big Comic Spirits
- Original run: April 26, 2021 – November 16, 2026
- Volumes: 10
- Television drama
- Directed by: Kana Matsumoto; Ema Kawawada; Kōji Taktasuchi
- Written by: Yoko Yonaiyama
- Music by: Harumi Fūki
- Studio: NHK
- Licensed by: Amazon Prime Video
- Original network: NHK General TV
- Original run: November 3, 2025 – December 4, 2025
- Episodes: 20
- Anime television series
- Directed by: Kei Suezawa
- Written by: Kei Suezawa
- Music by: Kaori Sawada
- Studio: Production +h.
- Licensed by: Viz Media; Netflix (streaming)
- Original network: NHK General TV
- Original run: January 2027 – scheduled
- icon

Hirayasumi (Japanese: ひらやすみ) is a Japanese manga series written and illustrated by Keigo Shinzō. It was serialized in Shogakukan's seinen manga magazine Weekly Big Comic Spirits from April 2021 to November 2026. A television drama adaptation aired from November to December 2025, and an anime television series adaptation produced by Production +h. is set to premiere in January 2027.

Hirayasumi won the 71st Shogakukan Manga Award in the general category in 2026.

== Plot ==
Hiroto Ikuta is a 29-year-old freelance worker employed at a fishing pond. His approachable demeanor attracts frequent interactions with elderly patrons, though he becomes nervous around women he finds attractive. Originally from Yamagata, he abandoned his acting aspirations after repeatedly failing auditions. He regularly visits 83-year-old Hanae Wada, a retired school cook who lives on pension, sharing meals at her home. After Hanae's sudden death from a heart attack, Ikuta inherits her house through prearranged paperwork. He subsequently houses his 18-year-old cousin Natsumi Kobayashi, an art school applicant, becoming her guardian in the inherited residence.

== Characters ==
Hiroto Ikuta (生田 ヒロト, Ikuta Hiroto)
Voiced by: Yuma Uchida
Portrayed by: Amane Okayama
Natsumi Kobayashi (小林 なつみ, Kobayashi Natsumi)
Voiced by: Mayu Takahashi
Portrayed by: Nana Mori
Hanae Wada (和田 はなえ, Wada Hanae)
Voiced by: Rikako Aikawa
Yomogi Tachibana (立花よ もぎ, Tachibana Yomogi)
Voiced by: Yoko Hikasa
Portrayed by: Riho Yoshioka
Hideki Noguchi (野口 ヒデキ, Noguchi Hideki)
Voiced by: Daisuke Namikawa
Portrayed by: Kaito Yoshimura
Saki Noguchi (野口 サキ, Noguchi Saki)
Portrayed by: Misako Renbutsu
Akari Yokoyama (横山 あかり, Yokoyama Akari)
Voiced by: Yume Miyamoto
Portrayed by: Nazuna Mitsushima
Ryō Ishikawa (石川 リョ, Ishikawa Ryō)
Voiced by: Yūichirō Umehara
Yasuki Nikaidō (二階堂 ヤスキ, Nikaidō Yasuki)
Portrayed by: Taro Suruga

== Media ==
=== Manga ===
Written and illustrated by Keigo Shinzō, Hirayasumi began serialization in Shogakukan's seinen manga magazine Weekly Big Comic Spirits on April 26, 2021. In October 2023, Shinzō stated that the manga would enter on hiatus until 2024, explaining that he was not sick, but that he required more time to "draw the manga in a satisfactory way that will leave no regrets," adding that he would still be drawing almost every day until its return; the series resumed on January 6, 2024. It ended serialization on November 16, 2026. Shogakukan has collected its chapters into individual tankōbon volumes. The first volume was released on September 10, 2021. As of April 30, 2026, ten volumes have been released.

In North America, the manga has been licensed for English release by Viz Media.

==== Volumes ====
No.	Original release date	Original ISBN	English release date	English ISBN
1	September 10, 2021	978-4-09-861118-8	May 21, 2024	978-1-9747-4691-0
2	December 10, 2021	978-4-09-861204-8	August 20, 2024	978-1-9747-4692-7
3	April 28, 2022	978-4-09-861299-4	November 19, 2024	978-1-9747-4924-9
4	September 30, 2022	978-4-09-861408-0	February 18, 2025	978-1-9747-5182-2
5	March 30, 2023	978-4-09-861604-6	May 20, 2025	978-1-9747-5480-9
6	August 30, 2023	978-4-09-862522-2	August 19, 2025	978-1-9747-5549-3
7	April 11, 2024	978-4-09-862690-8	November 18, 2025	978-1-9747-5886-9
8	November 28, 2024	978-4-09-863106-3	February 17, 2026	978-1-9747-6214-9
9	July 30, 2025	978-4-09-863519-1	May 19, 2026	978-1-9747-6333-7
10	April 30, 2026	978-4-09-863887-1	—	—

=== Drama ===
In July 2025, a television drama adaptation was announced. The drama was directed by Kana Matsumoto, Ema Kawawada, and Kōji Taktasuchi, with scripts written by Yoko Yonaiyama. It aired on NHK General TV's Yoru Dora (Evening Drama) timeslot from November 3 to December 4, 2025. The series ran for five weeks, comprising twenty 15-minute episodes. It also features the Asagaya Sisters comedy duo as themselves. It has been licensed for streaming on Amazon Prime Video.

=== Anime ===
In July 2025, an anime adaptation co-produced by Viz Media and Shogakukan-Shueisha Productions and animated by Production +h. was also announced. The series will be directed by Kei Suezawa, who is also in charge of the series composition and scriptwriting, with Naoyuki Asano serving as character designer, Mika Nishimura as art director, and Kaori Sawada composing the music. It is set to premiere on NHK General TV in January 2027. The opening theme song will be performed by Gen Hoshino, while the ending theme song is "Fūmizekka" (風味絶佳; lit. 'Delicious Flavor'), performed by Tomoo. Netflix will stream the series worldwide, alongside U-Next in Japan.

== Reception ==
Hirayasumi ranked third on "The Best Manga 2022 Kono Manga wo Yome!" ranking by Freestyle magazine. The series ranked sixth on the Publisher Comics' Recommended Comics of 2022. Alongside Nabe ni Dangan wo Ukenagara, Hirayasumi ranked eighteenth in the 2023 edition of Takarajimasha's Kono Manga ga Sugoi! list of best manga for male readers. It ranked 24th the 2023 "Book of the Year" list by Da Vinci magazine.

It won the Tokyo News Services' TV Bros magazine Bros. Comic Award 2021. The manga was nominated for the 15th Manga Taishō in 2022, and placed third with 66 points; it was nominated for the 17th edition in 2024, and placed ninth with 49 points. It was also nominated for the 27th Tezuka Osamu Cultural Prize in 2023. It was nominated at the Japan Society and Anime NYC's second American Manga Awards for Best Continuing Manga Series in 2025. Along with Fate Rewinder, Cosmos, Dandadan, and Dekin no Mogura, the series also won the 71st Shogakukan Manga Award in 2026. It has been nominated for the 2026 Eisner Award's Best U.S. Edition of International Material—Asia category.

The series received positive comments from manga artists, including Inio Asano, Masakazu Ishiguro, Misaki Takamatsu, Retto Tajima, Taiyō Matsumoto and Yama Wayama.

== See also ==
- Tokyo Alien Bros., another manga series by the same author
- Nora to Zassō, another manga series by the same author
