= Nezumi's First Love =

Japanese manga series

- First tankōbon volume cover

ねずみの初恋 (Nezumi no Hatsukoi)
- Genre: Romantic thriller
- Manga
- Written by: Riku Oseto
- Published by: Kodansha
- English publisher: NA: Kodansha USA
- Imprint: Young Magazine KC Special
- Magazine: Weekly Young Magazine
- Original run: November 6, 2023 – present
- Volumes: 11
- icon

Nezumi's First Love (ねずみの初恋, Nezumi no Hatsukoi) is a Japanese manga series written and illustrated by Riku Oseto. It began serialization in Kodansha's seinen manga magazine Weekly Young Magazine in November 2023.

== Plot ==
Nezumi, a young girl trained as an assassin by the yakuza, is at an arcade trying out a claw machine when she meets Ao, another boy trying out the machines. They later meet again, where he gives her the plush he won. Nezumi, who due to her difficult upbringing has never experienced love, is surprised when Ao confesses to her. She accepts and the two start living together, with Nezumi dealing with both their relationship and her own work and past life.

== Media ==
=== Manga ===
Written and illustrated by Riku Oseto, Nezumi's First Love began serialization in Kodansha's seinen manga magazine Weekly Young Magazine on November 6, 2023. The series entered its final arc on May 18, 2026. Its chapters have been compiled into eleven tankōbon volumes as of September 2026.

During their panel at New York Comic Con 2024, Kodansha USA announced that they had licensed the series for English publication beginning in Q4 2025.

No.	Original release date	Original ISBN	North American release date	North American ISBN
1	March 6, 2024	978-4-06-534423-1	October 28, 2025	978-1-64-729471-7
1. "Life's Short, Girl, Fall in Love!"; 2. "A Foolish Request"; 3. "Promise"; 4. "Happiness"; 5. "Practice"; 6. "Lovers"
2	June 6, 2024	978-4-06-535825-2	January 20, 2026	978-1-64-729506-6
7. "The Big Event"; 8. "Closing In"; 9. "Dream"; 10. "Date"; 11. "Red"; 12. "Daily Life"; 13. "The Park"; 14. "Unclear"; 15. "The Girl"; 16. "Growth"
3	September 5, 2024	978-4-06-536880-0	March 24, 2026	978-1-64-729593-6
17. "Fun in the Rain"; 18. "Miracle"; 19. "Encounter"; 20. "God"; 21. "Salvation"; 22. "Savior"; 23. "Hey"; 24. "Cherub"; 25. "The Fourth Target"
4	December 6, 2024	978-4-06-537865-6	June 16, 2026	978-1-64-729594-3
26. "The Future"; 27. "Wounds"; 28. "Wounds, Part 2"; 29. "Hole"; 30. "Love Hotel"; 31. "The Middle"; 32. "6/15"; 33. "Egg, Daikon, Shirataki"; 34. "Meeting"
5	March 6, 2025	978-4-06-538914-0	November 10, 2026	978-1-64-729602-5
35. "Midori"; 36. "Pig"; 37. "Heroine"; 38. "Plan"; 39. "The Middle part 2"; 40. "Black"; 41. "Konnyaku, Chikuwa, and Mochi Kinchaku"; 42. "In the Red"; 43. "Let's Get Soft Serve Together"; 44. "Zzz"
6	June 6, 2025	978-4-06-539947-7	December 15, 2026	978-1-64-729646-9
7	September 5, 2025	978-4-06-540797-4	February 16, 2027	978-1-64-729691-9
8	December 5, 2025	978-4-06-541757-7	April 27, 2027	978-1-64-729693-3
9	March 6, 2026	978-4-06-542879-5	June 22, 2027	978-1-64-729695-7
10	June 5, 2026	978-4-06-543849-7	—	—
11	September 4, 2026	978-4-06-544753-6	—	—
12	December 4, 2026	978-4-06-546117-4	—	—

=== Other ===
The series had a collaboration with the band Creep Hyp in a music video of their song "Mamagoto" on May 19, 2025.

== Reception ==
The series was recommended by fellow manga artist Katsuhisa Minami. It was also recommended by the Canadian singer-songwriter The Weeknd.

The series was nominated for the tenth Next Manga Awards in the print category, and ranked 12th out of 41 nominees. Along with Cosmos, the series ranked ninth on Takarajimasha's Kono Manga ga Sugoi! list of best manga of 2025 for male readers. The series also ranked eighth in the Nationwide Bookstore Employees' Recommended Comics list of 2025. It was nominated for the 49th Kodansha Manga Award in the general category in 2025. It has also been nominated for the 50th edition in 2026 in the same category.
