= Tokyo Alien Bros. =

Japanese manga series

- First tankōbon volume cover

トーキョーエイリアンブラザーズ (Tōkyō Eirian Burazāzu)
- Genre: Science fiction comedy
- Manga
- Written by: Keigo Shinzō
- Published by: Shogakukan
- English publisher: NA: Viz Media
- Imprint: Big Comics
- Magazine: Monthly Big Comic Spirits
- Original run: June 27, 2015 – January 27, 2017
- Volumes: 3
- Television drama
- Directed by: Michael Arias; Shintaro Sugawara
- Written by: Shō Kataoka
- Original network: Nippon TV
- Original run: July 23, 2018 – September 24, 2018
- Episodes: 10
- icon

Tokyo Alien Bros. (Japanese: トーキョーエイリアンブラザーズ, Hepburn: Tōkyō Eirian Burazāzu) is a Japanese manga series written and illustrated by Keigo Shinzō. It was serialized in Shogakukan's Monthly Big Comic Spirits from June 2015 to January 2017, with its chapters collected in three tankōbon volumes. It was adapted into a ten-episode Japanese television drama which was broadcast on Nippon TV from July to September 2018.

== Plot ==
Two brothers, Fuyunosuke (冬ノ介) and Natsutaro Tanaka (田中 夏太郎, Tanaka Natsutarō), have been sent to Earth on a scouting mission to learn about humans, so their species can colonize the planet. However, they must contend with their incomplete understanding of human social norms while attempting to hide their true identities as aliens.

== Media ==
=== Manga ===
Written and illustrated by Keigo Shinzō, Tokyo Alien Bros. was serialized in Shogakukan's Monthly Big Comic Spirits from June 27, 2015, to January 27, 2017. Shogakukan collected its chapters in three tankōbon volumes, released from February 12, 2016, to March 10, 2017. In May 2024, Viz Media announced that it licensed the series for English publication, with the first volume being released on January 21, 2025.

==== Volumes ====
No.	Original release date	Original ISBN	English release date	English ISBN
1	February 12, 2016	978-4-09-187450-4	January 21, 2025	978-1-9747-4729-0
2	July 7, 2016	978-4-09-187667-6	April 15, 2025	978-1-9747-5248-5
3	March 10, 2017	978-4-09-189390-1	July 15, 2025	978-1-9747-5542-4

=== Drama ===
The manga was adapted into a ten-episode Japanese television drama which aired on Nippon TV from July 23 to September 24, 2018.

== Reception ==
The manga was nominated for the Best Comic Award at the 45th Angoulême International Comics Festival in 2018. It has been nominated for the 2026 Eisner Award's Best U.S. Edition of International Material—Asia category.

== See also ==
- Nora to Zassō, another manga series by the same author
- Hirayasumi, another manga series by the same author
