= Cosmos (manga) =

Japanese manga series

- First tankōbon volume cover
- Genre: Comedy-drama; Science fiction
- Manga
- Written by: Ryuhei Tamura
- Published by: Shogakukan
- English publisher: NA: Viz Media
- Imprint: Sunday GX Comics
- Magazine: Monthly Sunday Gene-X
- Original run: April 19, 2023 – present
- Volumes: 9
- icon

Cosmos (stylized in all caps) is a Japanese manga series written and illustrated by Ryuhei Tamura. It began serialization in Shogakukan's seinen manga magazine Monthly Sunday Gene-X in April 2023.

== Synopsis ==
Set in modern-day Japan where aliens live hidden among humans, the series follows high school student Kaede Mizumori. After being recruited by investigator Rin Homura from the Galactic Financial Insurance Group "Cosmos", he uses his innate ability to detect lies to help solve cases involving extraterrestrials. Through his work, he confronts challenges arising from human-alien coexistence while developing his own abilities.

== Media ==
=== Manga ===
Written and illustrated by Ryuhei Tamura, Cosmos began serialization in Shogakukan's seinen manga magazine Monthly Sunday Gene-X on April 19, 2023. The series' chapters have been collected in nine tankōbon volumes as of June 2026

In October 2024, Viz Media announced that it has licensed the manga for English release in North America, with the first volume released on May 20, 2025.

==== Volumes ====
No.	Original release date	Original ISBN	English release date	English ISBN
1	November 17, 2023	978-4-09-157784-9	May 20, 2025	978-1-9747-5464-9
2	February 19, 2024	978-4-09-157798-6	August 19, 2025	978-1-9747-5514-1
3	May 17, 2024	978-4-09-157823-5	November 18, 2025	978-1-9747-5832-6
4	September 19, 2024	978-4-09-157834-1	February 24, 2026	978-1-9747-5884-5
5	January 17, 2025	978-4-09-157851-8	May 26, 2026	978-1-9747-6328-3
6	May 19, 2025	978-4-09-157882-2	August 25, 2026	978-1-9747-6514-0
7	September 19, 2025	978-4-09-157898-3	December 15, 2026	978-1-9747-6645-1
8	February 19, 2026	978-4-09-158216-4	—	—
9	June 18, 2026	978-4-09-158227-0	—	—
10	December 17, 2026	978-4-09-158253-9	—	—

=== Other ===
In commemoration of the release of the manga's sixth volume on May 19, 2025, a promotional video and a commercial were uploaded to the Monthly Sunday Gene-X YouTube channel that same day. The commercial appeared during the broadcast of Case Closed on NNS-affiliated stations on May 24, 2025. Both videos feature narration by Takayuki Sugō.

== Reception ==
The series was ranked fifth in the print category at the tenth Next Manga Awards in 2024; it was nominated for the eleventh edition in 2025 in the same category, and ranked second. Along with Nezumi's First Love, Cosmos ranked ninth on Takarajimasha's Kono Manga ga Sugoi! list of best manga of 2025 for male readers. It was nominated for the 18th Manga Taishō in 2025 and ranked eighth with 38 points. Along with Fate Rewinder, Dandadan, Dekin no Mogura, and Hirayasumi, the series won the 71st Shogakukan Manga Award in 2026.

The series was recommended by manga authors Tite Kubo, Kazuhiro Fujita, Hiromu Arakawa, and Rumiko Takahashi, with comments featured on the obi of the first, second, fourth, and fifth volumes, respectively.
