= Dekin no Mogura =

Japanese manga series

- Dekin no Mogura: The Earthbound Mole
- First tankōbon volume cover, featuring Mogura Momoyuki

出禁のモグラ (Dekin no Mogura)
- Genre: Comedy; Dark fantasy; Supernatural
- Manga
- Written by: Natsumi Eguchi
- Published by: Kodansha
- English publisher: Kodansha (digital)
- Imprint: Morning KC
- Magazine: Morning
- Original run: April 8, 2021 – present
- Volumes: 13
- Anime television series
- Directed by: Hiroshi Ishiodori
- Written by: Shinzō Fujita
- Music by: Tomoki Hasegawa
- Studio: Brain's Base
- Licensed by: Crunchyroll; SA/SEA: Medialink
- Original network: Tokyo MX, BS11
- Original run: July 7, 2025 – September 22, 2025
- Episodes: 12
- icon

Dekin no Mogura: The Earthbound Mole (Japanese: 出禁のモグラ, Hepburn: Dekin no Mogura; lit. 'The Banned Mole') is a Japanese manga series written and illustrated by Natsumi Eguchi. It began serialization in Kodansha's seinen manga magazine Morning in April 2021. An anime television series adaptation produced by Brain's Base aired from July to September 2025.

== Plot ==
Mogura Momoyuki, a shady self proclaimed hermit, is injured and runs when university students Yaeko and Magi attempt to help. They later return to find him unscathed and telling stories of him being immortal. They soon begin to believe his proclamation of immortality especially when they begin to see spirits.

== Characters ==
Momoyuki Mogura (百暗 桃弓木, Mogura Momoyuki)
Voiced by: Yuichi Nakamura (Japanese); Alex Hom (English)
Kuriaki Magi (真木 栗顕, Magi Kuriaki)
Voiced by: Genki Okawa (Japanese); Nicholas Markgraf (English)
Yaeko Kirihara (桐原 八重子, Kirihara Yaeko)
Voiced by: Yukiyo Fujii (Japanese); Kelsey Cruz (English)
Shio Inukai (犬飼 詩魚, Inukai Shio)
Voiced by: Akane Fujita (Japanese); SuzAnne DeCarma (English)
Kyōshirō Nekozuku (猫附梗史郎, Nekozuku Kyōshirō)
Voiced by: Ayumu Murase (Japanese); Ben Stegmair (English)
Tōshirō Nekozuku (猫附藤史郎, Nekozuku Tōshirō)
Voiced by: Shunsuke Takeuchi (Japanese); Landon McDonald (English)
Kyōko Nekozuku (猫附杏子, Nekozuku Kyōko)
Voiced by: Atsumi Tanezaki (Japanese); Kate Bristol (English)
Maggie (マギー君, Magī-kun)
Voiced by: Aki Toyosaki
Sukekiyo (スケキヨ)
Voiced by: Mafia Kajita (Japanese); Phil Parsons (English)

== Media ==
=== Manga ===
Written and illustrated by Natsumi Eguchi, Dekin no Mogura began serialization in Kodansha's seinen manga magazine Morning on April 8, 2021. Its chapters have been compiled into thirteen tankōbon volumes as of July 2026.

Kodansha started publishing the manga digitally in English on its K Manga service in June 2025.

==== Volumes ====
No.	Release date	ISBN
1	September 22, 2021	978-4-06-523881-3
2	March 23, 2022	978-4-06-527152-0
3	September 22, 2022	978-4-06-529041-5
4	March 23, 2023	978-4-06-531123-3
5	August 23, 2023	978-4-06-532543-8
6	January 23, 2024	978-4-06-534354-8
7	June 21, 2024	978-4-06-535724-8; 978-4-06-535945-7 (SE)
8	November 21, 2024	978-4-06-537534-1; 978-4-06-537528-0 (SE)
9	April 23, 2025	978-4-06-538978-2; 978-4-06-538980-5 (SE)
10	July 23, 2025	978-4-06-540076-0; 978-4-06-540102-6 (SE)
11	August 22, 2025	978-4-06-540479-9; 978-4-06-540482-9 (SE)
12	February 20, 2026	978-4-06-542544-2; 978-4-06-542543-5 (SE)
13	July 22, 2026	978-4-06-544199-2; 978-4-06-544198-5 (SE)

=== Anime ===
An anime television series adaptation was announced on November 18, 2024. The series is produced by Brain's Base and directed by Hiroshi Ishiodori, with Shinzō Fujita overseeing series scripts, Yōko Tanabe designing the characters, and Tomoki Hasegawa composing the music. It aired from July 7 to September 22, 2025, on Tokyo MX and BS11. The opening theme song is "Kamidanomi" (Plea to God) performed by syudou, and the ending theme song is "Kensō" ("tumult") performed by Mirin Sheeno featuring Aile The Shota. Crunchyroll is streaming the series. Medialink licensed the series in South and Southeast Asia for streaming on Ani-One Asia's YouTube channel.

==== Episodes ====
No.	Title	Directed by (Note: Production staff information is taken from the ending credits of each episode.)	Written by	Storyboarded by	Original release date
1	"At a Certain Location in Tokyo"; Transliteration: "Tonai Bōsho Nite" (Japanese: 都内某所にて)	Hiroshi Ishiodori	Shinzo Fujita	Hiroshi Ishiodori	July 7, 2025
2	"Spirit = Human"; Transliteration: "Yūrei = Ningen" (Japanese: 幽霊=人間)	Naoki Hishikawa	Shinzo Fujita	Hiroshi Ishiodori	July 14, 2025
3	"The Gathered Crew"; Transliteration: "Sorotta Jinzai" (Japanese: 揃った人材)	Kouki Onoue & Hiroshi Ishiodori	Shinzo Fujita	Hiroshi Ishiodori	July 21, 2025
4	"The Mystery of the Mad Dog and the Red Panda"; Transliteration: "Kyōken to Ressāpanda no Kai" (Japanese: 「狂犬とレッサーパンダの怪」)	Naoki Hishikawa	Shinzo Fujita	Naoki Hishikawa	July 28, 2025
5	"Trigger"; Transliteration: "Hikigane" (Japanese: 引き金)	Shoshi Kobari & Hiroshi Ishiodori	Shinzo Fujita	Koichi Ohata	August 4, 2025
6	"Brothers and Sisters"; Transliteration: "Kyōdai to Shimai to" (Japanese: 兄弟と姉妹と)	Hiroshi Ishiodori	Shinzo Fujita	Kazuhiko Shibuya	August 11, 2025
7	"The Trap of Only Seeing Results"; Transliteration: "Kekka Shika Mienai Wana" (Japanese: 結果しか見えない罠)	Naoki Hishikawa	Shinzo Fujita	Koichi Ohata	August 18, 2025
8	"The Merfolk"; Transliteration: "Ningyo-Sama" (Japanese: 人魚様)	Shoshi Kobari & Hiroshi Ishiodori	Shinzo Fujita	Masaharu Okuwaki	August 25, 2025
9	"The Great Mother's Love"; Transliteration: "Idaina Haha no Ai" (Japanese: 偉大な母の愛)	Takafumi Fujii	Shinzo Fujita	Koichi Ohata	September 1, 2025
10	"True Worth"; Transliteration: "Shinka" (Japanese: 真価)	Shoshi Kobari & Hiroshi Ishiodori	Shinzo Fujita	Hiroshi Ishiodori	September 8, 2025
11	"The Merfolk and the Bakeneko"; Transliteration: "Ningyo to Bake Neko" (Japanese: 人魚と化け猫)	Naoki Hishikawa	Shinzo Fujita	Hiroshi Ishiodori	September 15, 2025
12	"During the Rainy Season"; Transliteration: "Tsuyu no Naka Nite" (Japanese: 梅雨の中にて)	Hiroshi Ishiodori	Shinzo Fujita	Hiroshi Ishiodori	September 22, 2025

== Reception ==
Along with Fate Rewinder, Cosmos, Dandadan, and Hirayasumi, the series won the 71st Shogakukan Manga Award in 2026.

== See also ==
- Hozuki's Coolheadedness, another manga series by the same author
