= Fate Rewinder =

Japanese manga series

- Fate Rewinder: All Great Achievements Require Time
- First tankōbon volume cover, featuring Chrono

運(うん)命(めい)の巻(まき)戻(もど)士(し) (Unmei no Makimodoshi)
- Genre: Adventure; Action comedy; Science fiction
- Manga
- Written by: Fūta Kimura
- Published by: Shogakukan
- English publisher: NA: Yen Press
- Imprint: Tentomushi CoroCoro Comics
- Magazine: Monthly CoroCoro Comic; Kiracoro Comics
- Original run: January 15, 2022 – present
- Volumes: 13
- Anime television series
- Directed by: Rie Matsumoto
- Written by: Kimiko Ueno
- Music by: Satoshi Murai
- Studio: Bones Film
- Licensed by: Crunchyroll
- Original network: ANN (TV Asahi)
- Original run: April 2027 – scheduled
- icon

Fate Rewinder: All Great Achievements Require Time (Japanese: 運(うん)命(めい)の巻(まき)戻(もど)士(し), Hepburn: Unmei no Makimodoshi; lit. 'Rewinder of Fate') is a Japanese manga series written and illustrated by Fūta Kimura. Originally released as a one-shot in February 2021, it later began serialization the following month, with its chapters collected in thirteen tankōbon volumes as of September 2026. An anime television series adaptation produced by Bones Film is set to premiere in April 2027.

The story follows the adventures of Chrono, a young boy who joins a secret order of time travelers utilizing special temporal-manipulation device in their right eye to undo tragedies across time and space, hoping to solve and prevent the death of his beloved sister.

== Synopsis ==
=== Setting ===
Fate Rewinder centers around the "Space-Time Strategic Enforcement Unit" (時空警察特殊機動隊(じくうけいさつ とくしゅきどうたい), Jikū Keisatsu Tokushu Kidōtai), a secret order of time travelers serving to prevent catastrophes on a larger scale across time and space itself.

Operating from a dilapidated building in the year 2087, they send special agents called "Rewinders" (巻戻士(まきもどし ), Maki modo-shi; otherwise called "Fate Rewinders") to undo the deaths of their designated targets by repeatedly utilizing their "Retry Eye" (リトライアイ, Ritoraiai), an eyepatch-hidden prosthetic right eye with a built-in time machine that allows its user to rewind time and use prior knowledge of the events that transpired to avert a doomed target's demise. It can also revive recently deceased Rewinders, though at the cost of those revived Rewinders having their memories of the prior loop wiped clean, necessitating the importance of bringing them up to speed on the task at hand. A major drawback of repeatedly using one's Retry Eye is that its user starts suffering psychological damage and physical exhaustion with each successive use after rewinding more than a hundred times. Furthermore, damage to the Retry Eye may occur through various methods, which could make it inoperable unless it is repaired in a timely manner. Additionally, in certain cases, a Rewinder's Retry Eye might awaken its full potential in the form of "Version Up" (開眼(バージョンアップ), Bājon'appu; lit. 'Version Upgrade'), a special ability unique to each Rewinder that grants limited access to a particular aspect of space-time itself, albeit with caveats that restrict it to at most a single use per loop.

Given the complex nature of a designated target's death and the circumstances leading to it, a Rewinder's mission can quickly turn into a war of attrition, necessitating the completion of their objective by any means before their body gives out under psychological and physical strain. The unit employs a ranked system to classify mission difficulty, with the prestigious "SS Grade Rank" reserved for the most complex cases, such as the infamous "Case 999" (ケース999, Kēsu 999), of which no Rewinder has ever successfully solved so far.

At times, the Space-Time Strategic Enforcement Unit frequently clashes with the "Clock Hands", a notorious criminal organization that wields time-traveling technology for illicit purposes and disrupts the Rewinders' operations.

=== Plot ===
After a personal tragedy that took something from him, a young boy named Chrono is inducted into the Space-Time Strategic Enforcement Unit as its new Rewinder, under the mentorship of Shirai, a former Special Grade Rewinder. Shirai, who lost his ability to rewind after a traumatic event damaged his Retry Eye, trains Chrono for several years. With his Retry Eye, analytical intuition, photographic memory, and an inhuman mental durability, along with the aid of his sentient flying smartphone, "Smartphone," 14-year-old Chrono rises through the ranks, aiming to solve "Case 999", an unsolvable case involving the death of his sister, Tokine, and a member of the notorious "Clock Hands" terrorist organization.

In the process, he have made numerous allies as he working alongside them in various missions: Akaba, a katana-wielding 16-year-old Rewinder and self-professed disciple of Shirai; Lemon, a monotonic 12-year-old gynoid; and Chainu, a meek and timid 18-year-old Rewinder with a mysterious past. Together, they tackle various cases of increasing complexity as Chrono often coming into conflict with the "Clock Hands", whose members are constantly hindering their mission(s) and preventing Chrono from rising up the ranks and tackling "Case 999" for reasons beyond everyone's understandings.

== Characters ==
=== Main protagonists ===
Chrono (クロノ, Kurono)
Voiced by: Shō Komura
Chrono (born September 9, 2049) is a kind-hearted 14-year-old boy who often goes out of his way to help others, even if it involves the smallest of things. Compassionate to his core, he tried his best to be as supportive to everyone around him, especially children, though younger kids find him intimidating due to his unique laugh—characterized by the onomatopoeia "Nuboo" (ぬぼ〜っ, Nu bo)—and his somewhat expressionless face.
His absent-mindedness, as often pointed out by Smartphone, has led to incidents like food poisoning from unfamiliar nuts and reckless behavior while focusing on helping others. Nonetheless, Chrono's stubbornness and positive, almost optimistic outlook are evident in his determination to overcome challenges, even when confronted with the looming possibility of failure and the sheer overwhelming odd stacked against him.
Due to witnessing Tokine's unusual death during "Case 999" and his inability to save her even with Shirai's help, Chrono developed a seething hatred toward any and all concepts of fate, as well as any attempts of giving up on the chance to avert one, often escalating into physical blows as he refused to allow such notions such as pre-determined events to define one's self.
As a Rewinder, Chrono is driven by an unwavering dedication to saving lives, regardless of the obstacles or personal sacrifices involved. This commitment requires him to possess an extraordinary level of mental fortitude, enabling him to tirelessly retry missions, often repeating the same sequence of events thousands upon thousands of times, until he achieves his objective of successfully saving his target. His remarkable photographic memory serves as a crucial asset in this endeavor, allowing him to meticulously strategize and memorize a vast array of routes and possibilities. He analyzes each attempt, learning from his mistakes, until he can identify the "clear route" – the optimal path that leads to the successful completion of his missions and the preservation of the lives he is sworn to protect.
Before becoming a Rewinder, Chrono faced bullying and social isolation during his elementary school years. He often compared himself unfavorably to his popular sister Tokine, leading to feelings of self-loathing.
Chrono's Version Up is "Copy" (複製(コピー), Kopī), allowing him to summon a copy of himself from three minutes in the future. This copy can act independently on his own, providing assistance in critical situations. Once three minutes has passed, the original Chrono rewinds to a prior timeframe, leaving only the copy behind.
Akaba (アカバ, Akaba)
Voiced by: Kōhei Amasaki
Akaba (born October 4, 2056) is a 16-year-old Rewinder who uses a single katana as his weapon, typically carrying it on his back, secured with a belt.
A contemporary of Chrono, Akaba was promoted to Second Grade Rewinder after taking the "Second-Grade Promotion Exam" alongside him. He uses the pronoun "washi" (わし, Washi) and speaks with a Hiroshima accent, often using phrases like "I'm ____" and "I can ____". His distinct appearance includes jagged teeth, and unlike most Rewinders, he does not wear an eyepatch, as his Retry Eye is hidden by his bangs.
Akaba is cheerful and lively, though somewhat violent and very reckless. He does not hesitate to be a little tyrannical in order to complete his missions, yet despite this, he is capable of calmly assessing and judging situations. Originally destined to die in a boat accident at the age of six on May 16, 2062, coincidentally the same date as he and Chrono's current mission at the airport, Akaba was saved by Shirai and now serves as a Rewinder. As a result, he holds Shirai in high regard, decorating his room with posters and photos of the two of them together, and often attempts to imitate Shirai by recreating the idol's iconic ability.
Although Akaba initially disliked Shirai's only student, Chrono, even beating him during the martial arts test of the entrance exam, the two have since developed a good relationship. Having passed the promotion exam, they now go camping together, meet up to hang out, and Akaba often tries to help Chrono in times of danger.
Akaba sometimes refers to others by the name of their species, such as calling Lemon "Android" or Smartphone "Smartphone", rather than using their real names. He is also a poor cook, producing "dark matter" through his cooking, though he remains unaware of this and continues to act normally around others.
Akaba's Version Up is "Forward" (早送り(フォワード), Fowādo), allowing him to move 200 times faster for 3 seconds, making him appear as an incomprehensible blur in the blink of an eye.
Lemon (レモン, Remon)
Voiced by: Reina Ueda
Lemon (born June 10, 2075), originally designated as "Super Combat Specialized Space-Time Rescue Android LM-1" (超戦闘特化型時空救助アンドロイドLM-1, Chō sentō tokkagata jikū kyūjo andoroido LM-1), is a combat gynoid created with enhanced strength, speed and endurance, though the name "Lemon" was given to her by Shirai out of amusement. She possesses a Retry Eye of her own and a wide array of combat abilities, including her "rocket fist", her palm cannons and a variety of combat modes: "Mode: Valkyrie" (MODE(モード)戦女神(ヴァルキリー), Mōdovarukirī), which summons a variety of hidden weapons from her body; and "Mode: Athena" (MODE(モード)戦女神(アテナ), Mōdoatena), which allowed her to fly and fire a barrage of missiles at her targets.
As a "Second Grade Rewinder", Shirai describes her as a "Rewinder with fighting power on par with Shirai's." Lemon is characterized by her calm and collected demeanor, keen insight, and a lack of visible emotions. It was only during a critical moment involving her and her designated target, when she received defiant words from Chrono against Kibaku/"12 O'Clock" during a mountain mission, that Lemon's capacity to experience emotions awakened for the first time in her life.
Lemon's Version Up is "Stop" (停止(ストップ), Sutoppu), enabling her to stop the flow of time for herself and other Rewinders for a maximum of 20 seconds. However, since it consumes energy, it can only be used once per mission.
Chainu (チャイヌ, China)
Chainu (Born November 1, 2005) is an 18-year-old "Second Grade Rewinder", who excels in infiltration, earning her the title of "infiltration expert" from Shirai, partly due to her Version Up ability and unassuming appearance. She wields retractable spears, typically carrying two hidden in her right pocket, and is able to shrink them to fit inside. It is believed that she took the second-grade promotional exam alongside Chrono.
Despite this, she is a very timid person and has expressed fear and hesitation, saying, "After failing the Rewinder missions several times, I became afraid of seeing people die." Notably, she wears an eye patch for medical purposes.
It is later revealed that Chainu is a Clock Hands spy and the granddaughter of Hyde/"3 O'Clock." However, they are not related by blood as Chainu was raised by Hyde to gather intel on the Rewinders, particularly Chrono who joins her on a particular mission. Additionally, Chainu's seven personas were not all that existed, for Hakugin, another Second-Grade Rewinder, is actually "Chanee", the eighth persona, lacking the cloud-like hair typical of her other forms.
According to Hyde, Chainu was abandoned by her biological parents. Her mother, a Rewinder, gave birth to Chainu after falling in love with a target during a mission. Through DNA testing, it is discovered that Chainu's mother was actually Chainu herself, leading to a bootstrap paradox in which she gave birth to herself.
Struggling with her existence after learning the truth, Chainu manifested her Retry Eye's Version Up in despair, developing eight personalities and the ability to transform to protect her emotional well-being. Fearing she eventually disappear by defying fate, she initially followed Hyde. However, after receiving Chrono's encouragement to "fight against fate", Chainu made a comeback as a Rewinder and helped Chrono and Goro defeat Hyde. Following the mission, all other Rewinders, already aware of her status as a Clock Hands spy, pointed their blades at her. Despite this, Chainu chose to continue as a Rewinder, partly inspired by Chrono's support, urging her to live for herself.
Chainu's Version Up is "Encode" (変換(エンコード), Enkōdo), which allowed her to transform into any of her eight personas, each with their quirks, personalities and abilities, each categorized by a different color for her usual red cloud-like bangs. Chainu's various personas, created by "Encode," represent her non-existent family members who protect her "true self", such as an older sister, grandfather, pets, and others. However, due to her origins, there are no personas corresponding to her mother or grandmother.
So far, apart from her true self and the eighth persona, only three of the seven reportedly-recorded personas are shown: "Chawan" (チャワン, Chawan), a cream-fur corgi with the personality of a middle-aged man representing her "pet dog", possesses an enhanced sense of smell and agility; "Chanii" (チャニイ, Chanii), a dashing ladies' man representing her "brother", capable to seducing anyone into giving them valuable intel as long as it is female; and "Chaimo" (チャイモ, Chaimo), a small two-year-old toddler representing her "baby sister", whose smallest of actions triggers a "butterfly effect" of catastrophic proportions.
Shirai (シライ, Shirai)
Voiced by: Koki Uchiyama
Shirai (born April 6, 2024) is a 26-year-old Rewinder, wielding a katana as his weapon of choice. Originally designated as a "Special Grade Rewinder", Shirai lost this status during the infamous "Case 999" incident. During the operation, his Retry Eye was damaged by "1 O'Clock," a leader of the "Clock Hands" organization. This injury rendered him unable to perform retries, leading to his reclassification as a former Special Grade Rewinder. Despite this setback, Shirai maintains a distinguished record, with a mission success rate exceeding 98%. His smartphone companion, Kurohon, refers to him as "the strongest Rewinder" due to his strategic mind and exceptional combat abilities. Following the impairment of his Retry Eye, Shirai became a mentor to Chrono, training him as a Rewinder, though he later had his Retry Eye repaired later on during the "Case 88" incident.
Shirai is known for his fondness for sweets. He has been observed attempting to consume multiple taiyaki on his own and has a particular liking for strawberry milk, though he keeps this preference hidden from others. While Shirai initially appears composed and serious, he has a notable fondness for wordplay and humor. He is frequently seen carrying books consisting a collection of foreign jokes and often incorporates puns into his conversations. Despite claiming to dislike "boring things", his puns are frequently met with indifference or amusement at their simplicity.
During his junior high school years, Shirai led a solitary life, describing this period as lonely. This changed after meeting Chrono, Akaba, and Lemon, who became his companions during their mission to rescue him from a Clock Hand member.
Shirai's Version Up is "Record/Replay" (記録(レコード)/再生(リプレイ), Rekōdo/Ripurei), which functions in two parts by "recording" his prior actions up to that point before summoning semi-tangible afterimages that repeat that exact action.
Goro (ゴロー, Gorō)
Goro (born May 6, 2045) is a 42-year-old veteran Rewinder and the founder and captain of the Space-Time Strategic Enforcement Unit. Renowned as the strongest of all known Rewinders, his exceptional mental fortitude rivals that of Chrono. Goro wields a unique transforming clamshell phone as his weapon of choice. This device, through specific keycode combinations, can generate a variety of functions, including weapons and utilities.
Goro is characterized by his rugged, shaven appearance and a pragmatic, often ruthless demeanor. He is willing to make difficult, cold-blooded decisions to ensure the success of his missions. Despite this, he demonstrates genuine concern for other Rewinders, particularly those who exhibit unwavering determination in their pursuits.
During a mission, Goro forcibly deported Chrono and Chainu before falling into the crater of a volcano, seemingly taking Hyde/"3 O'Clock" with him to his death. However, an older version of Goro later appeared before Chrono and the other Rewinders, revealing that he had survived thanks to the final function of his transforming phone. Following his survival, Goro spent several years with Hyde, gathering intelligence about the Clock Hands. After Hyde succumbed to illness, Goro encountered his younger self from that era. This pivotal moment led to the establishment of the Space-Time Police Special Forces, after which Goro withdrew from public life. His foreknowledge of his eventual survival allowed him to prepare for his battles with unwavering resolve, knowing he would live to see that age.
Goro's Version Up is "Revise" (逆再生(リバース), Ribāsu), enabling him to playing out a future event from 20 seconds ahead in reverse, giving him an ample opportunity for planning out his next move. During the 20 seconds that the ability is active, everything plays in reverse, resulting in surreal scenes such as the opponent running backwards or flying off a wall. However, it also consumes a lot of energy, leaving Goro so exhausted that he is unable to stand up properly after using it.
Hakugin (ハクギン, Hakugin)
A female "First Grade Rewinder" with a mission success rate of 91% in the five years she has been with the order.
A cool woman with short, wavy hair, she is an incredible spearwoman. However, she is also a spy for Clock Hands, who steals entire lists of data on Rewinders from the past few years. After returning from a mission, she is discovered to be a spy, but then she suddenly disappears just as quickly, revealing that Hakugin is actually "Chanee" (チャネエ, Chanee), the eighth persona of another Rewinder named Chainu representing her "sister".
Haizaki (ハイザキ, Haizaki)
A young boy who uses a couple of custom-made handguns and applied to become Chrono's Rewinder apprentice, just like Gray. He also has very weak mental strength and memory.
He has a cheerful and calm personality, sometimes to a frightening degree. He accompanies Gray on the mission that is said to cost Chrono his life.
Gray (グレイ, Gurei)
A "Third Grade Rewinder" who requested to become Chrono's apprentice.
A young girl with enough strength to carry a sardine-shaped rocket-propelled hammer capable of easily breaking through walls. However, her aptitude as a Rewinder is exceedingly low, as she reached her mental limit after just two retries, and she also has a poor memory. She is cheerful, but has a foul mouth and is quick to pick a fight, often complicating things by smashing anything in sight.
As it turned out, as far as Chrono and Haizaki could remember, Gray is something of an anomaly to them due to the inconsistency of her appearances from their point of view, making her a sort of a Schrödinger's cat. It was later revealed that she is actually Rei (レイ, Rei), a young brown-haired heiress and one of the targets Chrono saved on one of his past missions, which would later led to her dyeing her hair pink and calling herself under her new alias as a Rewinder upon being scouted by the organization to assist Chrono and Haizaki in tackling "Case 88".

=== YouTube-exclusive protagonists ===
Engine (エンジ, Enji)
Engine is a female "Second Grade Rewinder" characterized by her short crimson hair and a somewhat slender body. She appears to be somewhere the same age range between Chrono and Akaba. However, her mental maturity remains underdeveloped, leading to a laid-back and occasionally careless personality. This often results in her becoming distracted or jumping to conclusions, which frequently causes trouble.
Despite her flaws, Engine prioritizes cuteness in all aspects of her actions. Even when a mission appears successfully completed, if she deems the result "not cute", she will persistently attempt it again, demonstrating a determination and straightforwardness comparable to Chrono's.
Engine wields an M16 rifle as her primary weapon, though ironically, she lacks proficiency in firearm usage and often resorts to employing the rifle as a blunt weapon.
As she is an original character for the YouTube-exclusive stories, she is not involved in the main story at all, but she has been shown as one of the characters during crowd shots in the main story.
Anko (アンコ, Anko)
Another female "Second Grade Rewinder" with black and white two-tone hair, styled into a pair of curly twintails, and her brash personality as she often used a pair of brass knuckles for combat. She uses the first-person pronoun "boku" and often ends her sentences with "dabe (sa)."
Smartphone says she is an excellent Rewinder, but she has a strange habit of playing the recorder she carries around with her when she gets embarrassed or excited, which often surprises people who meet her for the first time.
Like her friend Engine, she is an original character for the YouTube-exclusive stories and thus, not involved in the main story at all, though she has been shown as one of the characters during crowd shots in the main story.
Anko's Version Up is "Sync" (同期(シンク), Singku), which enabled her to synchronize with a single person for 20 seconds, either making them follow her movements like a puppet via "Sync Share" (同期(シンク) する右手(シェア), Singkushea) or temporarily copy their skills via "Sync Load" (同期(シンク) する左手(ロード), Shinkurōdo).
Wasabi (ワサビ, Wasabi)
A "Semi-First-Grade Rewinder", who is often characterized by his gas mask and his Retry Eye's heart-shaped pupil. His catchphrase is "〜Jan".
Arguably the strongest Rewinder of the Semi-First Grade Rewinder, known to have used his Retry Eye the most times in successful missions to date, approximately 100 times or less. He is also one of the few Rewinders who does not rewind/retry the most. Furthermore, his fighting power is exceptional, and if it's just his instantaneous fighting power, it seems to be comparable to that of a Special Grade Rewinder like Shirai.
However, his body is so sensitive to the outside air that removing his gas mask in a dirty place causes him to immediately vomit blood, only gets better the moment he puts his mask back. Incidentally, when he usually removes his gas mask, he can temporarily holding his breath, making him stronger the more he held his breath.
He has a "lone wolf" personality, always grumpy and surly, and is quite a problem child, trying to act alone when on multiple missions and not hesitate to hit and kill enemies, yet there are instances of some dangerous missions where he's just that good at his profession that the target is alive. However, he has a kind side, as he often helps out and rewinds for his dying companions.
He is quite proficient with close-quarters combat, though he also uses a whip as a weapon.
Like with Engine and Anko, he is an original character for the YouTube-exclusive stories and thus, not involved in the main story at all.
Okayu (オカユ, Okayu)
A young and mysterious "Third Grade Rewinder" whom Chrono met during a mission within a ruined castle alongside Chainu, often known for her childish and clumsy, yet very chill demeanor.
Despite her small size, Okayu is able to wield a large and very heavy sword Chrono is tasked to carry for the Rewinder.
Like with Engine, Anko and Wasabi, she is an original character for the YouTube-exclusive stories and thus, not involved in the main story at all.

=== Supporting characters ===
Smartphone (スマホン, Sumahon)
A special AI smartphone companion who supports Chrono on his missions as his partner. It floats in the air and moves using its twin propellers. By activating its data mode, it can access the Rewinder HQ database and provide information. It is quite expressive for a sentient smartphone, often pointing out Chrono's flaws and obsession with perfect success. Although it recognizes Chrono as an idiot, it highly values his observational skills and mental strength, even going so far as to consider him a "once-in-a-century talent."
Kurohon (クロホン, Kurohon)
Shirai's AI smartphone partner, who supports him on missions. His appearance is similar to Smartphone, but he has a rougher tone and a more stern expression. He is a talkative person, and he explained Shirai's abilities at length, and he felt that Chrono had the qualities to be a Rewinder.

=== Antagonists ===
==== Clock Hands ====
The main antagonistic faction of Fate Rewinder. A notorious criminal organization with unauthorized access to time travel technology, the "Clock Hands" (時空犯罪組織(クロックハンズ), Jikū Hanzai Soshiki Kurokkuhanzu; lit. 'Space-Time Crime Organization – Clock Hands') deploys its agents across time and space to spread chaos and destruction as much as possible, often clashing with the Rewinders trying to undo the damage caused by the organization on top of their usual objectives. Additionally, each of them is obliged to interfere with Chrono specifically on sight, trying to prevent him from solving "Case 999" for an unknown reason.

Each member of Clock Hands are commonly called and ranked by their designation based on the "12-hour" clock motif, with those holding a lesser hour being the strongest.

1 O'Clock (1オクロック, 1 Okurokku)
The leader of the Clock Hands organization, commonly referred as Masked Man (仮面の男, Kamen no otoko) due to his mysterious nature behind the mask, as well as the true perpetrator of "Case 999" who declares to kill Tokine for reasons unknown, having possessing a similar ability to rewind time on a whim.
He refused to explain their obsession with killing Tokine and even successfully thwarted Shirai's rescue attempt, damaging his Retry Eye in the process.
12 O'Clock (12オクロック, 12 Okurokku)
Real name Kiba (キバク, Kibaku), 12 O'Clock is the Clock Hands' explosives expert. Possesses a tremendous mental fortitude not unlike Chrono, he is an unnervingly nonchalant person who dismisses each attempt with a simple "That's hilarious" (ウケた, Uketa), serving as the main obstacle in Chrono and Lemon's mission to save a girl named Yuki during a violent snowstorm.
11 O'Clock (11オクロック, 11 Okurokku)
Real name May Russelheart (マイ・ラッセルハート, Mai rasseruhāto), 11 O'Clock is a Clock Hands agent sent to kill Shirai during his high-school days in a bid to stop him from becoming involved in an incident that later became known as "Case 999" and thus, preventing him from recruiting a young Chrono into the Space-Time Strategic Enforcement Unit as its Rewinder. Possessing the ability to manipulate memories, having used it on the entire school to impede Chrono, Akaba and Lemon, as well as implanting false memories on the latter two, she's also an insane inventor who is equipped with a set of mechanical arms with its own set of weapons.
She was once a young girl who nurtured her talents for invention and hacking under the guidance of her invention-loving parents. However, disaster struck the building where they lived, and she lost her parents. Although she was saved by a Rewinder during the incident, her parents were left behind, fueling her resentment toward the Rewinders for their arrogance in choosing whose lives to save. This led to her being scouted by the Clock Hands. While she opposes Chrono and his group out of hatred for the Rewinders, her natural love for invention and her kind-hearted nature remain intact, as she later willingly turned herself in to the Space-Time Strategic Enforcement Unit for further clues on the Clock Hands.
3 O'Clock (3オクロック, 3 Okurokku)
Real name Hyde (ハイド, Haido), 3 O'Clock is an old man wearing a gentleman-like tuxedo who often funds the Clock Hands with their heinous projects. He possesses the ability to displace himself and other people into another location without limits, even taking any object held with them in the process. Furthermore, 3 O'Clock has a split personality named Jekyll (ジキル, Jikiru) who possesses an additional ability to ignore any and all processes and leaving only the results in its place, effectively skipping any attempts on him during battle.
As it turns out, he is later revealed to be the adopted parent of Chainu, who was implanted into the Space-Time Strategic Enforcement Unit as their mole under two different personas, having since grown to love his so-called "daughter" as he himself is a product of a bootstrap paradox just as much as the girl herself. Following the battle against Chrono, Chainu and Goro leading to the latter tricking him into falling into an active volcano and seemingly killing both him and Goro, the latter was able to save him and spends the next few years gathering intel on the Clock Hands before passing away, fully content to know that Chainu gets to live out her own life with her newfound family in Chrono and the Rewinders.
4 O'Clock (4オクロック, 4 Okurokku)
Real name Kinsuke (キンスケ, Kinsuke), 4 O'Clock is a young teenage boy who once aspired to be a Rewinder due to his encounter with Chrono, Haizaki and Gray during one of their missions – classified as "Case 88" (ケース88, Kēsu 88) – to save Kinsuke's brother Gin. However, Haizaki kills Gin under the belief that saving Chrono's life from an unspecified death in that same mission requires killing the one he thinks will eventually become the future "4 O'Clock", causing him to fall into despair and be convinced by the Clock Hands into joining them in retaliation, scarring his forehead as a painful reminder of this tragedy.
4 O'Clock possesses the ability to render practically anything "infinite", such as causing any exits leading back to the same place, looping the same fired bullet back to the same targeted spot in a Möbius strip pattern, and even rendering Retry Eyes either inaccessible and/or rewinding back to the same place as before.

== Media ==
=== Manga ===
Written and illustrated by Fūta Kimura, Fate Rewinder was first released as a one-shot on January 15, 2022. The manga later began serialization in February 2022 the following month, adopting a monthly chapter release schedule.

Shogakukan compiled its chapters into individual tankōbon volumes. The first volume was released on May 27, 2022, and as of September 28, 2026, thirteen volumes have been released in Japan.

During their panel at Sakura-Con 2026, Yen Press announced that they had licensed the series for English publication, with the first volume set to release in October later in the year.

==== Volumes ====
No.	Original release date	Original ISBN	English release date	English ISBN
1	May 27, 2022	978-4-09-143399-2	October 27, 2026	979-8-8554-4040-9
Chapters: 1–4
2	September 28, 2022	978-4-09-143551-4	January 26, 2027	979-8-8554-4042-3
Chapters: 5-9
3	March 28, 2023	978-4-09-143589-7	—	—
Chapters: 10–14
4	May 26, 2023	978-4-09-143606-1	—	—
Chapters: 15–18
5	October 27, 2023	978-4-09-143650-4	—	—
Chapters: 19-22
6	April 17, 2024	978-4-09-143687-0	—	—
Chapters: 23–26
7	July 26, 2024	978-4-09-149749-9	—	—
Chapters: 27–31
8	December 26, 2024	978-4-09-149855-7	—	—
Chapters: 32–35
9	April 28, 2025	978-4-09-154032-4	—	—
Chapters: 36–39
10	July 28, 2025	978-4-09-154051-5	—	—
Chapters: 40–43
11	December 26, 2025	978-4-09-154109-3	—	—
Chapters: 44–47
12	April 28, 2026	978-4-09-154258-8	—	—
Chapters: 48–52
13	September 28, 2026	978-4-09-154353-0	—	—
Chapters: 48–52

==== Chapters not yet in tankōbon format ====
These chapters have yet to be published in a tankōbon volume. They were serialized on Monthly Coro-Coro Comic.

=== Anime ===
An anime television series adaptation was announced on July 10, 2025. The series is set to be produced by Bones Film and directed by Rie Matsumoto, with Story Inc. in charge of production, Kimiko Ueno handling series composition, Toshihiro Kawamoto designing the characters, and Satoshi Murai composing the music. It is set to premiere in April 2027 on the IMAnimation programming block on TV Asahi and its affiliates. Crunchyroll will stream the series.

=== Other media ===
==== YouTube channel ====
Fate Rewinder: The Great Turnabout from Despair

YouTube information
- Channel: Fate Rewinder ~The Great Turnabout from Despair~
- Years active: March 5, 2022–present
- Genres: Sci-Fi; Adventure; Action comedy
- Subscribers: 290 thousand
- Views: 336.64 million

An official YouTube channel based on Fate Rewinder was released on March 5, 2022, with new content specifically original to the channel aired on a bi-week upload schedule alongside official content from the manga release.

== Reception ==
The series was nominated for the 69th Shogakukan Manga Awards in 2023; it won the 71st edition in 2026, along with Cosmos, Dandadan, Dekin no Mogura, and Hirayasumi.
