= Between the Sheets (manga) =

Japanese manga series

- English volume cover

シーツの隙間 (Sheets no Sukima)
- Genre: Drama; Yuri
- Manga
- Written by: Erica Sakurazawa
- Published by: Shodensha
- English publisher: NA: Tokyopop
- Magazine: Feel Young
- Original run: August 1995 – January 1996
- Volumes: 1

Between the Sheets (Japanese: シーツの隙間, Hepburn: Sheets no Sukima) is a Japanese yuri manga series written and illustrated by Erica Sakurazawa. It was published in Shodensha's Feel Young from August 1995 to January 1996, before being collected into a single tankōbon volume in 2020. It is licensed for an English-language release by Tokyopop.

== Synopsis ==
The series follows Saki and Minako, two best friends who are almost inseparable. Minako has always had a strong affection for the other girl, which Saki is initially unaware of. However, when Minako sleeps with Saki's boyfriend to discover what Saki sees in him, the full nature of Minako's fixation begins to emerge.

== Publication ==
Written and illustrated by Erica Sakurazawa, Between the Sheets was serialized in Shodensha's Feel Young from August 1995 to January 1996. The series was collected into a tankōbon volume on September 25, 1996.

The series was licensed for an English release in North America by Tokyopop and has been noted as being part of the first josei manga to be released in English.

No.	Original release date	Original ISBN	English release date	English ISBN
1	September 25, 1996	978-4396761561	May 6, 2003	978-1591823230

== Reception ==
Ash Brown from Manga Bookshelf praised Between the Sheets while noting it was an "exceptionally disturbing and even horrifying work." Brown regarded the series as an "uncomfortable read" due to Minako's obsessive fixation on Saki but felt that "Sakurazawa handles the intensity of those feelings in a believable way." Erica Friedman of Yuricon remarked that series was an "altogether unsatisfactory as an early Yuri story" that lacks a sympathetic cast, however she also noted the importance of the work being one of the first josei manga's that explored a yuri theme, and the first to be translated to English.
