= List of Bunny Drop chapters =

Bunny Drop (うさぎドロップ, Usagi Doroppu) is a Japanese josei manga series by Yumi Unita. It was serialized in the monthly magazine Feel Young from October 2005 to April 2011, collected into nine wide-ban volumes by Shodensha. An anime adaptation by Production I.G aired in Japan between July and September 2011. A live-action film was also made and premiered in Japan on August 20, 2011. A spin-off series, also by Unita, entitled Usagi Drop: Bangaihen was serialized in Feel Young from July to December 2011 and collected in one volume. The series has been licensed in English by Yen Press, with the tenth and final volume released on April 22, 2014. The plot follows thirty-year-old Daikichi as he becomes the guardian of Rin, the illegitimate six-year-old daughter of his grandfather.

== Volume list ==
No.	Original release date	Original ISBN	North America release date	North America ISBN
1	May 19, 2006	978-4-39-676380-0	March 23, 2010	978-0-7595-3122-2
episode. 1; episode. 2; episode. 3; episode. 4; episode. 5; episode. 6
Daikichi Kawachi, a thirty-year-old single man, attends the funeral for his grandfather, Souichi Kaga. He learns that Souichi fathered a daughter named Rin Kaga. His relatives treat Rin like an outcast causing Daikichi to impulsively reprimand them and asks Rin if she wants to stay with him to which she agrees. Daikichi begins to adapt to a life of looking after Rin. After the hassle of choosing a day care for Rin, Daikichi realizes he has to cut back on his work hours and asks his boss for a demotion. Rin begins wetting her bed and Daikichi discovers the cause to be from stress caused by the thought of Daikichi dying and leaving her alone. He comforts by telling her he won't die until Rin is an old lady. At the day care, Rin befriends Kouki Nitani allowing Daikichi to befriend Kouki's mother. While Daikichi brings Rin to visit his parents, he journeys to his grandpa's house looking for evidence of Rin's mother. He finds a cable modem and deduces it belongs to Rin's mother.
2	February 8, 2007	978-4-39-676400-5	September 28, 2010	978-0-7595-3119-2
episode. 7; episode. 8; episode. 9; episode. 10; episode. 11; episode. 12
Daikichi questions Rin on the computer's owner and learns about the existence of Souichi's helper, Masako. After entering Rin for first grade, Daikichi finds his grandpa's will in Rin's medical book revealing the identity of Rin's mother, Masako Yoshi. Daikichi arranges to meet with Masako. During their meeting, Masako tells Daikichi Rin is no longer her daughter and requests Daikichi to legally adopt Rin and have her take his surname. Rin rejects the adoption stating her father is Souichi and Daikichi is himself.
3	October 6, 2007	978-4-39-676421-0	March 29, 2011	978-0-7595-3120-8
episode. 13; episode. 14; episode. 15; episode. 16; episode. 17; episode. 18
Daikichi plants Rin a loquat tree commemorating her entrance into school. He suspects his grandpa planted an osmanthus when Rin was born and investigates Souichi's home. Upon finding it, he digs it up and transfers it to his house. Later, Daikichi prepares Rin and Kouki so they may start going to school by themselves. At work, a new female employee attempts to infatuate Daikichi. He wards off her advances by telling her he has a daughter at home. Daikichi begins to worry about Rin's future after hearing how his co-workers insurance for their children. After the teachers finish visiting the student's homes, Daikichi invites Kouki and Nitani for dinner. While the four of them eat, Daikichi realizes the four of them will be able to confront any future obstacle. Rin and Daikichi visit Souichi's grave where they find evidence Masako was there. Daikichi arranges for Masako to spy on Rin who is anguished at the sight of her daughter.
4	May 17, 2008	978-4-39-676434-0	September 20, 2011	978-0-7595-3121-5
episode. 19; episode. 20; episode. 21; episode. 22; episode. 23; episode. 24
Daikichi's cousin, Haruko Maeda, and his niece, Reina Maeda, leave home due to Haruko feeling rejected by her in-laws. After discussing her problems with Daikichi, she resolves to endure her in-laws for Reina's sake. While picking up Rin and Kouki, Daikichi and Nitani overhear about the spreading flu and the two discuss the impact it would cause on their jobs if their child was sick. Nitani takes care of Rin when she becomes sick with a cold. Daikichi returns the favor when Nitani is sick and looks after Kouki in the meantime. Afterwards, Daikichi notes his weight gain and joins Rin as she practices jump rope. Rin has a loose tooth and Daikichi seeks advice on how to deal with her. A year has passed since Daikichi has adopted Rin and he notes how his sacrifices has been worth it.
5	January 22, 2009	978-4-39-676449-4	March 27, 2012	978-0-3162-1033-1
episode. 25; episode. 26; episode. 27; episode. 28; episode. 29; episode. 30
Ten years have passed and Daikichi is 40 while Rin is 15. Kouki confesses his feelings to Rin who rejects him as he previously chose another girl over her. Rin, despite good grades, plans to work after graduating. Daikichi and his parents persuade her to continue her education, telling her they saved enough money for her to go to college. Kouki confronts his ex-girlfriend, Akari, about her threats to Rin. Daikichi recalls Rin and Kouki's feud during their middle-school year. Kouki was in his rebelling years and fails to return home one day. After Daikichi finds him, he proposes to Nitani that they live together but is turned down.
6	August 8, 2009	978-4-39-676467-8	August 21, 2012	978-0-3162-1719-4
episode. 31; episode. 32; episode. 33; episode. 34; episode. 35; episode. 36
Rin reminisces about the feud. Kouki begins going out with Akari in middle school. Akari notes Kouki's feelings for Rin and begins harassing her through text messages. Rin opts to block all messages from strangers including Kouki and is determined to forget him. In the present, Kouki asks Rin to forgive his past deeds. Akari attempts to extort money from Kouki by claiming to be pregnant. Rin steps in and disproves Akari's lie. Daikichi prepares for Rin's 16th birthday. He brings up the proposal to Nitani again who rejects him once again and tells him she is dating another man in order to have them both move on.
7	February 8, 2010	978-4-39-676485-2	November 20, 2012	978-0-3162-1720-0
episode. 37; episode. 38; episode. 39; episode. 40; episode. 41; episode. 42
Daikichi injures his back and is bedridden. He is taken care of by Rin and is visited by his friends. Rin speaks with Nitani and becomes curious on who her mother is. Daikichi finds evidence Rin is investigating her family tree and arranges a meeting with Masako Yoshi. Upon meeting each other, Masako apologizes for abandoning Rin. Rin accepts and hopes she will be able to become the sister to Masako's unborn child.
8	October 10, 2010	978-4-39-676506-4	April 23, 2013	978-0-3162-1722-4
episode. 43; episode. 44; episode. 45; episode. 46; episode. 47; episode. 48; episode. 49
As news that Kouki's mother is getting remarried, Rin starts to realize she has romantic feelings for Daikichi. Later, Rin goes to see Masako's new baby where, upon hearing a lullaby, she starts to see Masako as her mother. Rin is later asked out by a fellow student, which turns into a group outing to the movies. After Rin turns him down, saying she has someone else she likes, Kouki comes to the realization that the person Rin likes is Daikichi.
9	July 8, 2011	978-4-39-676525-5	August 20, 2013	978-0-3162-5277-5
episode. 50; episode. 51; episode. 52; episode. 53; episode. 54; episode. 55; last episode
Kouki tells Daikichi about Rin's feelings for him, which upsets Rin, who wanted to keep them hidden. She runs off but Daikichi manages to catch up with her. Later, as Rin expresses her wish to stay with him forever, Daikichi tells her he feels hurt, as he has always seen her as his daughter. Rin goes to see Masako, who reveals that she is not actually Souichi's daughter and thus has no blood ties to Daikichi. Daikichi knew all along that Souichi was not the father as he had read it in the will while Rin was still attending the nursery. With no way to object her, Daikichi asks Rin to give him two years until she graduates before he can make a decision. Two years later as Rin's feelings remain unchanged, Daikichi gives in and suggests that they eventually get married. Rin also hopes to bear a child with Daikichi, confident to be able to raise the child with the same affection that she had from Daikichi.
10	March 8, 2012	978-4-396-76541-5	April 22, 2014	978-0-316-40080-0
Chapter 1; Chapter 2; Chapter 3; Chapter 4; Chapter 5; Final Chapter
A collection of short stories.
