= Angel Nest =

Japanese manga series

- English version of Angel Nest as published by Tokyopop

天使の巣 (Tenshi no Su)
- Manga
- Written by: Erica Sakurazawa
- Published by: Shodensha
- English publisher: NA: Tokyopop
- Magazine: Feel Young
- Original run: 1999 – 2000
- Volumes: 1
- Live-action film

Tenshi
- Directed by: Mayumi Miyasaka
- Written by: Satoko Okudera
- Music by: Ryo Yoshimata
- Studio: Shochiku
- Released: January 21, 2006
- Runtime: 117 minutes

Angel Nest (天使の巣, Tenshi no Su), is a Japanese manga written and illustrated by Erica Sakurazawa. The manga was serialized in Shodensha's josei manga magazine Feel Young from 1999 to 2000, and collected in a single volume released on February 22, 2001. The manga was licensed for a North American release by Tokyopop, which released the manga on September 9, 2003. The manga was licensed in Germany by Tokyopop Germany and in France by Kana.

== Adaptations ==
Sakurazawa's earlier work Angel and this manga, Angel Nest were adapted into a live action film titled Tenshi (天使, lit. 'Angel'). The film was directed by Mayumi Miyasaka, who was awarded the Special Jury Prize for the Feature Length Competition division at the 2005 Skip City International D-Cinema Festival. The screenwriter for the film was Satoko Okudera, with Ryo Yoshimata as music director. Kyoko Fukada was cast as the angel, Shigeru Izumiya as Tano, Akemi Kobayashi as Emi and Saori Koide as Mizuho. The film premiered in Japan on January 21, 2006. The theme song of the movie, "Tenshi ga Maiori Te Kuru Hi" (天使が舞い降りて来る日, lit. The Day the Angel Comes Flying Down), was performed by Otake Yuki. A making-of DVD with Kyoko Fukada, detailing the production of the film was released by Happinet Pictures on January 14, 2006. It was followed by a photo-book published by Shodensha on January 28, 2006.

== Reception ==
Manga Worth Reading's Johanna Draper Carlson criticizes the manga's plot with "once you've created a woman who's happier out of a relationship and broken up her marriage, there's a lack of plot points that suggest themselves." Animefringe's Dillon Font commends Sakurazawa's "realistic and touching grasp on the interactions that people maintain with each other. Her dialogue is wonderfully honest and well-written. Her art and stories are a dream to experience and I'm pleased to report that her latest collection does not disappoint." Sequential Tart's Margaret O'Connell labels Angel Nest as a "sophisticated grown-up fantasy".
