= Natsuyuki Rendezvous =

Japanese manga series

- First tankōbon volume cover, featuring Ryosuke Hazuki

夏雪ランデブー (Natsuyuki Randebū)
- Genre: Romance, supernatural
- Manga
- Written by: Haruka Kawachi
- Published by: Shodensha
- Magazine: Feel Young
- Original run: June 8, 2009 – December 8, 2011
- Volumes: 4
- Manga

Natsuyuki Rendezvous Bangai-hen
- Written by: Haruka Kawachi
- Published by: Shodensha
- Magazine: Feel Young
- Original run: February 8, 2012 – August 8, 2013
- Volumes: 1
- Anime television series
- Directed by: Kō Matsuo
- Written by: Kō Matsuo
- Music by: Ken Muramatsu
- Studio: Doga Kobo
- Licensed by: NA: Sentai Filmworks
- Original network: Fuji TV (Noitamina)
- Original run: July 6, 2012 – September 14, 2012
- Episodes: 11
- icon

Natsuyuki Rendezvous (Japanese: 夏雪ランデブー, Hepburn: Natsuyuki Randebū; lit. 'Summer Snow Rendezvous') is a Japanese manga series written and illustrated by Haruka Kawachi. It was serialized in Shodensha's josei manga magazine Feel Young from June 2009 to December 2011, with its chapters collected in four tankōbon volumes. An 11-episode anime television series adaptation by Doga Kobo aired on Fuji TV's Noitamina block between July and September 2012. The anime series has been licensed by Sentai Filmworks in North America.

== Plot ==
A young man named Ryosuke Hazuki (voiced by Yuichi Nakamura) decides to work at a flower shop after developing romantic feelings for its owner, Rokka Shimao (voiced by Sayaka Ohara). Unbeknownst to Rokka, Ryosuke is able to perceive the spirit of her deceased husband, Atsushi (voiced by Jun Fukuyama). Atsushi, who has lingered in the earthly realm, seeks to disrupt any potential romantic relationships Rokka may form, thus forming an unusual love triangle between them.

== Media ==
=== Manga ===
Written and illustrated by Haruka Kawachi, Natsuyuki Rendezvous was serialized in Shodensha's josei manga magazine Feel Young from June 8, 2009, to December 8, 2011. Shodensha collected its 23 individual chapters in four tankōbon volumes, released from February 20, 2010, to April 7, 2012. An additional story, Natsuyuki Rendezvous Bangai-hen (夏雪ランデブー 番外編, Natsuyuki Randebū Bangai-hen), was serialized in the same magazine from February 8, 2012, to August 8, 2013. The collected volume was released on November 8, 2013.

=== Anime ===
A 11-episode anime television series adaptation by Doga Kobo aired on Fuji TV's Noitamina block between July 6 and September 14, 2012, and was simulcast by Crunchyroll. The opening theme is "See You" by Yuya Matsushita while the ending theme is "Anata ni Deawa Nakereba ~Natsuyuki Fuyuhana~ (あなたに出会わなければ 〜夏雪冬花〜; "If I Hadn't Met You: Winter Flowers in the Summer Snow") by Aimer. The series has been licensed in North America by Sentai Filmworks.

==== Episodes ====
No.	Original release date
1	July 6, 2012
Ryosuke Hazuki begins working at a flower shop after falling in love with its manager, Rokka. One evening while visiting Rokka's apartment, Ryosuke is disgruntled to find a man there, believing she already had a lover. However, he soon comes to learn that this man is in fact the spirit of Rokka's deceased husband, Atsushi Shimao, which only Ryosuke can see.
2	July 13, 2012
Ryosuke begins to make his feelings for Rokka known to her, but finds interference from Shimao, who refuses to give her to him. After arguing with Ryosuke after he accidentally makes a remark about Shimao, she collapses with a fever, forcing Shimao to reluctantly ask for Ryosuke's help.
3	July 20, 2012
As Ryosuke and Rokka's sister in law, Miho, help look after the store while Rokka recovers, Shimao starts becoming depressed and begins causing mental earthquakes.
4	July 27, 2012
Ryosuke takes Rokka on a date to an amusement park (specifically Hanayashiki), which proves to remind her a lot about Shimao. After Ryosuke ends up getting drunk after being depressed over something Rokka said, Shimao uses the opportunity to take over his body.
5	August 3, 2012
As Shimao gets used to Ryosuke's body, giving it a sporting new look, Ryosuke's spirit finds himself on a desert island, accompanied by an alternate version of Rokka.
6	August 10, 2012
As Ryosuke continues to roam the peculiar dreamland, Rokka, unaware of Shimao possessing Ryosuke's body, confesses that she's in love with Ryosuke.
7	August 17, 2012
Rokka goes with Shimao to the beach while Ryosuke's trip takes him to the bottom of the sea. As Shimao laments how Rokka has feelings for Ryosuke and not him anymore, he runs off with all of his old belongings, leaving behind a familiar message for Rokka.
8	August 24, 2012
As Rokka chases after Ryosuke's body, he comes to realise the truth that he is possessed by Shimao.
9	August 31, 2012
As Rokka finally manages to reach Shimao and confront him, Ryosuke comes to learn the disturbing truth about the world he is in.
10	September 7, 2012
Ryosuke reappears in the real world, only to discover he is in spirit form. As Ryosuke observes Rokka and Shimao, Rokka, coming to realise how long Shimao had taken over Ryosuke's body for, questions where the Ryosuke she fell in love with is.
11	September 14, 2012
Rokka is given the choice of whether she should live with Ryosuke or die and join Shimao, much to Ryosuke's horror. In the end, Shimao decides to leave a bite mark on Rokka for her to remember him by before relinquishing his body back to Ryosuke, allowing him to reaffirm his love with Rokka. After both Ryosuke and Rokka die years later and their daughter takes over the flower shop, Shimao instructs their grandchild to get rid of all his belongings.

== See also ==
- Rainy Day Serenade, another manga series by the same creator
