= Ghost of Undecimber =

2015 manga by Suzume Takano

- Volume 1 cover art, depicting Kiri (left) and Neri

13月のゆうれい (Jūsan Gatsu no Yūrei)
- Manga
- Written by: Suzume Takano
- Published by: Shodensha
- Imprint: Feel Comics Swing
- Magazine: Feel Young
- Original run: January 8, 2015 – December 8, 2016
- Volumes: 2

Ghost of Undecimber, known in Japan as 13 Gatsu no Yūrei (Japanese: 13月のゆうれい, Hepburn: Jūsan Gatsu no Yūrei; "The Ghost of the Thirteenth Month"), is a Japanese manga series created by Suzume Takano. Shodensha serialized it in their josei manga magazine Feel Young from January 8, 2015, to December 8, 2016, and released it across two collected tankōbon volumes in 2016–2017.

The story follows a love triangle involving Neri, a woman who dislikes being feminine; Kiri, a cross-dressing man; and Suō, an otherwise heterosexual man who finds Kiri attractive. The series was critically well received for its themes of questioning gender roles, and was selected as one of the recommended works at the Japan Media Arts Festival in 2018.

== Premise ==
Ghost of Undecimber follows Neri (ネリ), a woman who dislikes cute things and is uncomfortable with being feminine; Kiri (キリ), her twin brother who only feels at ease when cross-dressing in cute and feminine outfits; and Suō (周防), Kiri's roommate. A love triangle develops as Neri becomes attracted to Suō, who in turn finds Kiri attractive when wearing women's clothes, despite otherwise not being attracted to men.

== Production and release ==
Ghost of Undecimber was written and drawn by Suzume Takano, and was serialized irregularly by Shodensha in their josei manga magazine Feel Young from January 8, 2015, until December 8, 2016. They have also released it in two collected tankōbon volumes in 2016–2017 under their imprint Feel Comics Swing, which include an additional chapter each that was not part of the magazine serialization. Takano struggled with the schedule of the serialization, submitting each chapter to the publisher close to the deadline, and then went back to touch up the art for the release of the collected editions; the final chapter was particularly difficult, as one of Takano's family members died while she was in the middle of producing it.

=== Volumes ===
No.	Release date	ISBN
1	February 8, 2016	978-4396766658
Chapter 1–7; "Another Scene"
2	March 8, 2017	978-4396767013
Chapter 8–14; "Another Scene"

== Reception ==
Ghost of Undecimber was critically well received. It was chosen as one of the jury's recommended manga at the 21st edition of the Japanese Agency for Cultural Affairs' Japan Media Arts Festival in 2018, it was one of the featured books at the Kumazawa feminist book fair in 2018, and both volumes were included in Kono Manga ga Sugoi!'s daily recommended manga feature.

Kono Manga ga Sugoi found the love triangle and surrounding drama intriguing, and described it as something that kept them reading. They liked the story's portrayal of fashion as not only something fun, but also as a way to deal with reality, and the comparisons it makes to Cinderella. The Kumazawa book fair liked the series for its "deep characters" and discussion of gender roles, something Kono Manga ga Sugoi! also enjoyed, including the complexity and irony surrounding how Neri and Kiri relate to looking nearly identical but having different personalities and genders. Translator Jocelyne Allen also liked many of the series' themes, such as "awkward romance" and questioning of gender roles, as well as the minimalist ligne claire artwork, but did not find it to live up to its potential, wishing that Kiri did not cross-dress only because of past trauma and finding this to work against the story. Kono Manga ga Sugoi! liked the ending, calling it both impactful and hopeful.
