= Golden Raspberry (manga) =

Japanese manga series

- First tankōbon volume cover

ゴールデンラズベリー (Gōruden Razuberī)
- Manga
- Written by: Aki Mochida
- Published by: Shodensha
- Magazine: Feel Young
- Original run: July 8, 2020 – present
- Volumes: 6
- icon

Golden Raspberry (Japanese: ゴールデンラズベリー, Hepburn: Gōruden Razuberī) is a Japanese manga series written and illustrated by Aki Mochida. It has been serialized in Shodensha's josei manga magazine Feel Young since July 2020.

In 2022, Golden Raspberry won the Grand Prize at the 25th Japan Media Arts Festival.

== Publication ==
Written and illustrated by Aki Mochida, Golden Raspberry started in Shodensha's josei manga magazine Feel Young on July 8, 2020. Shodensha has collected its chapters into individual tankōbon volumes. The first volume was released on March 8, 2021. As of March 6, 2026, six volumes have been released.

=== Volume list ===
| No. | Japanese release date | Japanese ISBN |
|---|---|---|
| 1 | March 8, 2021 | 978-4-396-76818-8 |
| 2 | November 8, 2021 | 978-4-396-76845-4 |
| 3 | July 8, 2022 | 978-4-396-76860-7 |
| 4 | July 7, 2023 | 978-4-396-76889-8 |
| 5 | August 8, 2025 | 978-4-396-75079-4 |
| 6 | March 6, 2026 | 978-4-396-75098-5 |

== Reception ==
Golden Raspberry was awarded the Grand Prize of the Manga Division at the 25th Japan Media Arts Festival in 2022.
