= Why We Fall In Love =

Japanese manga series

- First tankōbon volume cover

私たちが恋する理由 (Watashitachi ga Koisuru-riyū)
- Genre: Romance
- Manga
- Written by: ma2
- Published by: Shodensha; Line Corporation; ShuCream
- English publisher: NA: Abrams ComicArts
- Magazine: Feel Young (2020–2023); Line Manga (2023–present); Our Feel (2024–present)
- Original run: May 8, 2020 – present
- Volumes: 6
- icon

Why We Fall In Love (Japanese: 私たちが恋する理由, Hepburn: Watashitachi ga Koisuru-riyū), also known as The Reason We Fall in Love, is a Japanese anthology manga series written and illustrated by ma2. It was serialized in Shodensha's josei manga magazine Feel Young from May 2020 to July 2023. The manga was transferred to Line Corporation's digital platform Line Manga in December 2023 and has also been published digitally on ShuCream's Our Feel since June 2024.

== Plot ==
The story takes place at a small advertising agency. Sales manager Tomonari Kurosawa is viewed as a distant, cold man due to his straightforward communication style and lack of emotion display. Aoi Morita has worked at the company for three years and is among those who fear Kurosawa. One day, while in the elevator, Morita—who is self-conscious about her height—is mocked by her director. Although she had resigned herself to enduring the situation in silence, a sudden turn of events brings an unexpected savior: Kurosawa. Morita begins to take an interest in Kurosawa, yet finds him difficult to understand due to his personality. Kurosawa, who has avoided relationships, believing they only complicate life, cannot help but feel jealous whenever he sees someone getting close to Morita. Alongside this budding romance, two other storylines unfold.

== Media ==
=== Manga ===
Written and illustrated by ma2, Why We Fall In Love started in Shodensha's josei manga magazine Feel Young on May 8, 2020. The last chapter in the magazine was published on July 7, 2023, (Note: It finished in the August 2023 issue, released on July 7 of that same year.) and the series was later transferred to Line Corporation's digital platform Line Manga on December 7 of the same year. On June 6, 2024, ShuCream, the manga production company that produced Feel Young, launched the manga website Our Feel, where the series has also continued its publication. Shodensha collected its chapters in four tankōbon volumes, released from April 8, 2021, to June 8, 2023. ShuCream re-released the four volumes digitally on June 1, 2024; the company released the four volumes in print on September 13. A fifth volume was released digitally on July 4, 2024, and in print on October 16. As of December 13, 2024, six volumes have been released.

In August 2026, Abrams ComicArts announced that it had licensed the series for English publication under their Kana imprint, with the first volume set to release on September 7, 2027.

==== Volumes ====
No.	Original release date	Original ISBN	English release date	English ISBN
1	April 8, 2021 (Shodensha print edition); June 1, 2024 (ShuCream digital edition); September 13, 2024 (ShuCream print edition)	978-4-396-76820-1 (Shodensha print edition); 978-4-910526-62-1 (ShuCream print edition)	September 7, 2027	978-1-4197-9223-6
2	January 8, 2022 (Shodensha print edition); June 1, 2024 (ShuCream digital edition); September 13, 2024 (ShuCream print edition)	978-4-396-76848-5 (Shodensha print edition); 978-4-910526-63-8 (ShuCream print edition)	—	—
3	October 7, 2022 (Shodensha print edition); June 1, 2024 (ShuCream digital edition); September 13, 2024 (ShuCream print edition)	978-4-396-76871-3 (Shodensha print edition); 978-4-910526-64-5 (ShuCream print edition)	—	—
4	June 8, 2023 (Shodensha print edition); June 1, 2024 (ShuCream digital edition); September 13, 2024 (ShuCream print edition)	978-4-396-76883-6 (Shodensha print edition); 978-4-910526-65-2 (ShuCream print edition)	—	—
5	July 7, 2024 (ShuCream digital edition); October 16, 2024 (Shodensha print edition)	978-4-910526-67-6 (ShuCream print edition)	—	—
6	December 13, 2024	978-4-910526-73-7	—	—

=== Live-action drama ===
A ten-episode live action television drama adaptation was broadcast on TV Asahi from October 12 to December 21, 2024, with Fuma Kikuchi and Rinka Kumada starring as the protagonists.

== Reception ==
The manga placed third in the eBookJapan Manga Award 2023. It ranked ninth in the second Crea Nighttime Manga Award in 2023.
