= Happy Mania =

Japanese manga series

- Eleventh tankōbon volume cover, featuring Kayoko Shigeta

ハッピー・マニア (Happī Mania)
- Genre: Romantic comedy
- Manga
- Written by: Moyoco Anno
- Published by: Shodensha
- English publisher: NA: Tokyopop
- Magazine: Feel Young
- Original run: August 1995 – August 2001
- Volumes: 11
- Television drama
- Directed by: Takao Kinoshita; Makoto Hirano
- Produced by: Masatoshi Kato; Tetsuya Sakashita
- Written by: Hiromi Kusumoto; Mika Umeda
- Music by: Akira Mitake
- Original network: Fuji TV
- Original run: July 8, 1998 – September 23, 1998
- Episodes: 12
- Manga

Go Happy Mania
- Written by: Moyoco Anno
- Published by: Shodensha
- Magazine: Feel Young
- Original run: September 6, 2019 – October 8, 2025
- Volumes: 6
- icon

Happy Mania (Japanese: ハッピー・マニア, Hepburn: Happī Mania) is a Japanese manga series written and illustrated by Moyoco Anno. It was serialized in Shodensha's josei manga magazine Feel Young from 1995 to 2001, with its chapters collected in eleven tankōbon volumes. It was licensed in North America by Tokyopop, with the volumes published from 2003 to 2004.

A 12-episode television drama adaptation was broadcast in 1998. A second manga series, titled Go Happy Mania, was serialized in Feel Young from 2019 to 2025.

== Plot ==
Shigeta, a young woman of 24, spends her days working at Tanaka Books and fretting over her love-life or the lack thereof. The biggest obstacle between Shigeta and a satisfying relationship seems to be Shigeta herself. When it comes to men she has exceedingly poor judgement, exacerbated by her even poorer self-esteem.

== Characters ==
Kayoko Shigeta (重田 加代子, Shigeta Kayoko)
Kayoko is an insecure 24-year-old woman who is quick to fall for potential suitors and even quicker to draw conclusions about those who she perceives as threatening to her love life.
Shuichi Takahashi (高橋 修一, Takahashi Shūichi)
A worker at the same bookstore as Kayoko. Shuichi is a student at Tokyo University and is in love with Kayoko despite her constant exploits with other men.
Hiromi Fukunaga (福永 ヒロミ, Fukunaga Hiromi) / Fuku (フクちゃん, Fuku-chan)
Shigeta's roommate and best friend. Fuku is a slightly older and significantly more grounded female character in the story whose relative success with men and more laid back demeanor serve as useful contrasts to Kayoko.
Yuko Tanabe
Another worker at the bookstore, Yuko is a plain looking girl who Kayoko is angered by when she finds out that Yuko has a boyfriend. Kayoko jealously seduces Yuko's boyfriend and has sex with him in a car but is then disappointed to find out that he is not, in fact, in love with her.
Tokieda (時枝)
A hip DJ that Kayoko meets in a club, Toki is the most significant crush that Kayoko has. After things do not work out with him, Kayoko temporarily renounces boys and focuses on work.
Kunihiko Sakai (境 邦彦, Sakai Kunihiko)
The son of a cult leader who Kayoko meets in her hometown when visiting her mother to borrow money. He stalks her after her interest in him wanes leading to his kidnap and near-rape of her, before Shuichi saves her.
Violet
Violet is a student. When Kayoko sees that Violet is interested in Shuichi, she too realizes his worth as a suitor and gets together with him.
Goro Kishiwada (岸和田 悟郎, Kishiwada Gorō)
Kishiwada is another of Kayoko's lovers. An accomplished pottery artist, Kishiwada is the reason that Kayoko takes a job as an apprentice to a pottery teacher.
Miss Midori
A rumored nymphomaniac, Miss Midori is Kishiwada's lover, and runs away with him.

== Media ==
=== Manga ===
Written and illustrated by Moyoco Anno, Happy Mania was serialized in Shodensha's josei manga magazine Feel Young from the August 1995 to the August 2001 issues. Shodensha collected its chapters in eleven tankōbon volumes, released from April 8, 1996, to October 20, 2001.

In North America, the manga was licensed for English release by Tokyopop. The eleven volumes were released from April 15, 2003, to December 7, 2004.

A one-shot chapter sequel was published in Feel Young on July 7, 2017. A second series, titled Go Happy Mania (後ハッピーマニア), was serialized in the same magazine from September 6, 2019, to October 8, 2025. Shodensha collected its chapters in six tankōbon volumes, released from August 6, 2020, to February 6, 2026.

==== Volumes ====
===== Happy Mania =====
No.	Original release date	Original ISBN	English release date	English ISBN
1	April 8, 1996	4-396-76148-1	April 15, 2003	1-59182-169-X
2	August 8, 1996	4-396-76153-8	June 10, 2003	1-59182-170-3
3	December 13, 1996	4-396-76158-9	August 12, 2003	1-59182-171-1
4	July 8, 1997	4-396-76166-X	October 14, 2003	1-59182-172-X
5	February 12, 1998	4-396-76175-9	December 9, 2003	1-59182-173-8
6	August 7, 1998	4-396-76187-2	February 10, 2004	1-59182-456-7
7	March 27, 1999	4-396-76195-3	April 13, 2004	1-59182-457-5
8	September 24, 1999	4-396-76209-7	June 8, 2004	1-59182-458-3
9	April 20, 2000	4-396-76220-8	August 10, 2004	1-59182-459-1
10	November 13, 2000	4-396-76237-2	October 5, 2004	1-59182-460-5
11	October 20, 2001	4-396-76257-7	December 7, 2004	1-59182-461-3

===== Go Happy Mania =====
No.	Japanese release date	Japanese ISBN
1	August 6, 2020	978-4-396-76795-2
2	April 24, 2021	978-4-396-76823-2
3	May 7, 2022	978-4-396-76854-6
4	June 23, 2023	978-4-396-76887-4
5	August 8, 2024	978-4-396-75052-7
6	February 6, 2026	978-4-396-75096-1

=== Drama ===
A 12-episode television drama adaptation, directed by Takao Kinoshita and Makoto Hirano, was broadcast on Fuji TV from July 8 to September 23, 1998. The series' theme song is "Paradise" by Southern All Stars.

== Reception ==
The manga has sold 3 million copies. Go Happy Mania ranked second on Takarajimasha's Kono Manga ga Sugoi! list of best manga of 2021 for female readers.
