= Ayame-kun no Nonbiri Nikushoku Nisshi =

Japanese manga series

- First tankōbon volume cover

アヤメくんののんびり肉食日誌
- Genre: Romantic comedy
- Manga
- Written by: Mai Machi
- Published by: Shodensha
- Magazine: Feel Young
- Original run: October 6, 2012 – present
- Volumes: 21
- Live-action film
- Directed by: Hiroki Shibasaki
- Written by: Kumiko Aso
- Music by: Dan Miyakawa
- Studio: Horipro
- Released: October 7, 2017
- Runtime: 99 minutes
- icon

Ayame-kun no Nonbiri Nikushoku Nisshi (アヤメくんののんびり肉食日誌; lit. 'Ayame's Carefree Journal on Meat-Eating') is a Japanese manga series written and illustrated by Mai Machi. First launched as a two-part one-shot, under the title Kami to Uroko, in Shodensha's josei manga magazine Feel Young in October and November 2012, Ayame-kun no Nonbiri Nikushoku Nisshi has been serialized in the same magazine since January 2013; its chapters have been collected in 21 tankōbon volumes as of November 2026. A live action film adaptation premiered in October 2017.

== Media ==
=== Manga ===
Written and illustrated by Mai Machi, the manga was preceded by a two-part one-shot story titled Kami to Uroko (髪と鱗; lit. 'Hair and Scale'), published in Shodensha's josei manga magazine Feel Young on October 6 and November 8, 2012. Ayame-kun no Nonbiri Nikushoku Nisshi then started its serialization in the same magazine on January 8, 2013. Shodensha has collected its chapters into individual tankōbon volumes, with the first one released on July 8, 2013. As of November 6, 2026, 21 volumes have been released.

==== Volumes ====
No.	Release date	ISBN
1	July 8, 2013	978-4-396-76583-5
2	April 8, 2014	978-4-396-76603-0
3	November 8, 2014	978-4-396-76624-5
4	June 8, 2015	978-4-396-76643-6
5	February 8, 2016	978-4-396-76664-1
6	October 8, 2016	978-4-396-76685-6
7	August 8, 2017	978-4-396-76709-9
8	February 8, 2018	978-4-396-76726-6
9	August 8, 2018	978-4-396-76743-3
10	April 8, 2019	978-4-396-76763-1
11	September 6, 2019	978-4-396-76769-3
12	April 8, 2020	978-4-396-76789-1
13	January 8, 2021	978-4-396-76815-7
14	August 6, 2021	978-4-396-76836-2
15	June 8, 2022	978-4-396-76858-4
16	November 8, 2022	978-4-396-76874-4
17	August 8, 2023	978-4-396-76894-2
18	June 7, 2024	978-4-396-75047-3
19	March 7, 2025	978-4-396-75067-1
20	December 8, 2025	978-4-396-75092-3
21	November 6, 2026	978-4-396-75116-6

=== Live action film ===
A live action film adaptation premiered in Japan on October 7, 2017. The film was directed by Hiroki Shibasaki, with a script by Kumiko Aso and music composed by Dan Miyakawa. It was produced and distributed by Horipro. The film stars Mario Kuroba as Shun Ayame and Rika Adachi as Daisy Tsubaki.

== Reception ==
By June 2022, the manga had over 1.2 million copies in circulation. The manga placed second in Rakuten Kobo's second E-book Award in the "Long Seller Comic" category in 2024.
