= Will I Be Single Forever? =

Japanese manga series by Mari Okazaki

- Tankōbon volume cover

ずっと独身でいるつもり? (Zutto Dokushin de Iru Tsumori?)
- Genre: Comedy-drama; Romance
- Manga
- Written by: Mari Okazaki
- Published by: Shodensha
- English publisher: NA: Viz Media (digital)
- Magazine: Feel Young
- Original run: April 8, 2014 – October 8, 2015
- Volumes: 1
- Live-action film
- Directed by: Momoko Fukuda
- Written by: Fumi Tsubota
- Music by: Shoji Ikenaga
- Studio: Nikkatsu
- Released: November 19, 2021
- Runtime: 94 minutes
- icon

Will I Be Single Forever? (Japanese: ずっと独身でいるつもり?, Hepburn: Zutto Dokushin de Iru Tsumori?) is a Japanese manga series written and illustrated by Mari Okazaki, based on a web essay by Mami Amemiya. It was serialized in Shodensha's josei manga magazine Feel Young from April 2014 to October 2015, with its chapters collected in a single tankōbon volume. A live action film adaptation premiered in November 2021.

== Media ==
=== Manga ===
Written and illustrated by Mari Okazaki, based on a web essay by Mami Amemiya, Will I Be Single Forever? was serialized in Shodensha's josei manga magazine Feel Young from April 8, 2014, to October 8, 2015. Shodensha collected its chapters in a single tankōbon volume released on December 8, 2015.

In North America, the manga is licensed by Viz Media and the volume was released digitally on July 24, 2018.

=== Live action film ===
A live action film adaptation premiered in Japan on November 19, 2021. The film was directed by Momoko Fukuda, with a script by Fumi Tsubota, and music composed by Shoji Ikenaga. It was distributed by Nikkatsu. The film stars Minami Tanaka as Mami Honda.
