= Memoirs of Amorous Gentlemen =

Japanese manga series

- First tankōbon volume cover

鼻下長紳士回顧録 (Bikachō Shinshi Kaikoroku)
- Genre: Historical
- Manga
- Written by: Moyoco Anno
- Published by: Shodensha
- English publisher: Crunchyroll Manga (digital); Cork (digital); Azuki (digital)
- Magazine: Feel Young
- Original run: November 8, 2013 – March 8, 2018
- Volumes: 2
- icon

Memoirs of Amorous Gentlemen (Japanese: 鼻下長紳士回顧録, Hepburn: Bikachō Shinshi Kaikoroku) is a Japanese manga series written and illustrated by Moyoco Anno. It was serialized in Shodensha's josei manga magazine Feel Young from November 2013 to March 2018, with its chapters collected in two tankōbon volumes.

== Media ==
=== Manga ===
Written and illustrated by Moyoco Anno, Memoirs of Amorous Gentlemen was serialized in Shodensha's josei manga magazine Feel Young from November 8, 2013, to March 8, 2018. Shodensha collected its chapters in two tankōbon volumes, released on October 8, 2015, and January 25, 2019.

The series was digitally published in English by Crunchyroll Manga. Cork released the first volume digitally on July 23, 2019. In July 2023, Azuki announced that they had licensed the series for digital release.

=== Other media ===
The series received a short anime adaptation, for the Japan Animator Expo project, which was released online in May 2015. Shirō Sagisu composed the music and Cork handled production.

Duncan Sheik wrote the music and lyrics, and Leah Nanako Winkler wrote the script for an American musical theater adaptation. An industry reading was held in New York City in February 2025. It premiered off-Broadway in New York City, with previews beginning on September 25, 2026, and opening on October 15 at the Night Egg, a new theater named after the French brothel featured in the manga. The show was originally scheduled to run through January 3, 2027, but it was later announced an early closing date of November 15, 2026. The musical is directed and choreographed by Rob Ashford, with set design by Scott Pask. Antonio Marion is the executive producer and Kenny Kurokawa is the producer. Sophia Anne Caruso stars as Colette.

== Reception ==
The series received an Excellence Award at the 23nd Japan Media Arts Festival in 2020.
