= White Note Pad =

Japanese manga series

- First tankōbon volume cover
- Genre: Drama
- Manga
- Written by: Tomoko Yamashita
- Published by: Shodensha
- Magazine: Feel Young
- Original run: February 6, 2015 – October 8, 2016
- Volumes: 2
- icon

White Note Pad (stylized in all caps) is a Japanese manga series written and illustrated by Tomoko Yamashita. It was serialized in Shodensha's josei manga magazine Feel Young from February 2015 to October 2016,

== Publication ==
Written and illustrated by Tomoko Yamashita, White Note Pad was serialized in Shodensha's josei manga magazine Feel Young from February 6, 2015, to October 8, 2016. Shodensha collected its chapters in two tankōbon volumes, released on December 4, 2015, and December 8, 2016.

=== Volumes ===
No.	Release date	ISBN
1	December 4, 2015	978-4-396-76661-0
2	December 8, 2016	978-4-396-76692-4
