= Ebine Yamaji =

Japanese manga artist

- Occupation: Manga artist

Ebine Yamaji (やまじえびね) is a Japanese manga artist who has created several works with a lesbian theme. These include Indigo Blue, the story of a young author discovering her sexuality, Free Soul, and Love My Life.

== Career ==
Her debut work was the short story "Sankakukei no dessert", published in Monthly LaLa in November 1984. Several of her works were serialized in the josei magazines Feel Young (published by Shodensha) and the now defunct Young You. Although some of her works have been published in France and in Italy, none of them have been officially released in English. A live-action version of her manga Love My Life, which she serialized in Feel Young from 2000 until 2001, was released in Japan in January 2007.

In the 2010s, she started publishing in the seinen manga magazine Comic Beam. Her manga Onnanoko ga Iru Basho wa, released in the magazine between 2021 and 2022, won the 2023 Tezuka Osamu Cultural Prize for short work.

== Works ==
Title	Year	Notes	Refs
Otenki to Issho (お天気といっしょ)	1996–2002	Serialized in Young You; Published by Shueisha in 3 vol.	
MAHOKO	1998	Published by Shueisha in 1 vol.	
Love My Life	2000–2001	Serialized in Feel Young; Published by Shodensha in 1 vol.	
Indigo Blue (インディゴ・ブルー)	2001–2002	Serialized in Feel Young; Published by Shodensha in 1 vol.	
Sweet Lovin' Baby (スウィート・ラヴィン・ベイビー)	2003	Published by Shodensha in 1 vol.	
Free Soul	2003–2004	Serialized in Feel Young; Published by Shodensha in 1 vol.	
Ai no Jikan (愛の時間)	2006–2008	Serialized in Feel Young; Published by Shodensha in 1 vol.	
Aoaza (Shimi) (青痣(しみ))	2009	Written by Kaoruko Himeno; Published by Fusōsha in 1 vol.	
La danse de l'ouiseau blessé (鳥のように飛べるまで, Tori no Yō ni Toberu Made)	2009–2010	Serialized in Feel Young; Published by Shodensha in 1 vol.	
Binetsu no Yō na (微熱のような)	2014	Serialized in Feel Young; Published by Enterbrain in 1 vol. as Night Worker	
Red Thimble (レッド・シンブル)	2015–2017	Serialized in Comic Beam; Published by Enterbrain in 3 vol.	
Mizu Umi (みずうみ)	2018	Serialized in Comic Beam	
Poor Little Mina: A Ghost Tale (かわいそうなミーナ, Kawaisōna Mīna)	2019	Serialized in Comic Beam; Published by Enterbrain in 1 vol.	
Onna no Ko ga Iru Basho wa (女の子がいる場所は)	2021–2022	Serialized in Comic Beam; Published by Enterbrain in 1 vol.	
