= Piece of Cake (manga) =

Japanese manga series

- First volume cover

ピース オブ ケイク (Pīsu obu Keiku)
- Genre: Romance
- Manga
- Written by: George Asakura
- Published by: Shodensha
- Magazine: Feel Young
- Original run: July 8, 2003 – December 8, 2008
- Volumes: 5
- Manga

Piece of Cake: Bangai-hen
- Written by: George Asakura
- Published by: Shodensha
- Magazine: Feel Young
- Original run: March 7, 2015 – June 8, 2015
- Volumes: 1
- Live-action film
- Directed by: Tomorowo Taguchi
- Written by: Kōsuke Mukai
- Music by: Otomo Yoshihide
- Released: September 5, 2015
- icon

Piece of Cake (Japanese: ピース オブ ケイク, Hepburn: Pīsu obu Keiku) is a Japanese manga series written and illustrated by George Asakura. It was serialized in Shodensha's josei manga magazine Feel Young from July 2003 to December 2008, with its chapters collected in five wideban volumes. A spin-off manga, titled Piece of Cake: Bangai-hen, was serialized in the same magazine from March to June 2015. A live action film adaptation directed by Tomorowo Taguchi premiered in September 2015.

== Characters ==
Shino Umemiya (梅宮 志乃, Unemiya Shino)
Portrayed by: Mikako Tabe
Kyōshirō Sugahara (菅原 京志郎, Sugahara Kyōshirō)
Portrayed by: Go Ayano
Akari Narita (成田 あかり, Narita Akari)
Portrayed by: Kaoru Mitsumune

== Media ==
=== Manga ===
Written and illustrated by George Asakura, Piece of Cake was serialized in Shodensha's josei manga magazine Feel Young from July 8, 2003, (Note: It debuted in the magazine's August 2003 issue, released on July 8 of that same year.) to December 8, 2008. Shodensha collected its chapters in five wideban volumes, released from May 8, 2004, to February 7, 2009.

A spin-off, titled Piece of Cake: Bangai-hen (ピース オブ ケイク 番外編), was serialized in Feel Young from March 7 to June 8, 2015. A single volume was released on July 8, 2015.

==== Volumes ====
| No. | Japanese release date | Japanese ISBN |
|---|---|---|
| 1 | May 8, 2004 | 978-4-3967-6332-9 |
| 2 | May 20, 2005 | 978-4-3967-6359-6 |
| 3 | July 7, 2006 | 978-4-3967-6382-4 |
| 4 | March 8, 2007 | 978-4-3967-6403-6 |
| 5 | February 7, 2009 | 978-4-3967-6453-1 |
| Extra | July 8, 2015 | 978-4-3967-6644-3 |

=== Live-action film ===
A live action film adaptation directed by Tomorowo Taguchi premiered on September 5, 2015.

== Reception ==
The film grossed ¥52.8 million on its opening weekend and was number 10 at the box office.
