= Gene Bride =

Japanese manga series

- First tankōbon volume cover

ジーンブライド (Jīn Buraido)
- Genre: Drama, science fiction
- Manga
- Written by: Hitomi Takano
- Published by: Shodensha
- English publisher: NA: Seven Seas Entertainment
- Imprint: Feel Comics Swing
- Magazine: Feel Young
- Original run: June 8, 2021 – November 8, 2024
- Volumes: 4

Gene Bride (ジーンブライド, Jīn Buraido) is a Japanese science fiction drama manga series written and illustrated by Hitomi Takano. It was serialized in Shodensha's Feel Young magazine from June 2021 to November 2024.

The series centers around Ichi Isahaya, a woman sick of workplace misogyny, as she reunites with former classmate Masaki, with whom she was supposedly matched as a "Gene Bride" following an experiment in middle school.

== Synopsis ==
Gene Bride is a sci-fi drama centered on Ichi Isahaya, a woman disillusioned by sexism in the workplace and the unexpected reunion with a man linked to her past. Tired of being dismissed and harassed simply because she is a woman trying to succeed in a male-dominated environment, Ichi's routine is disrupted when Masaki, a former classmate, suddenly reappears claiming they were once matched as ideal partners during a genetic compatibility experiment (the titular "Gene Bride") back in middle school. Although Ichi barely recalls the event, Masaki's return sets off a chain of events that leads her to confront forgotten memories and uncover hidden truths from their shared history.

== Publication ==
Written and illustrated by Hitomi Takano, Gene Bride was serialized in Shodensha's Feel Young magazine on June 8, 2021, to November 8, 2024. Its chapters were compiled into four tankōbon volumes released from November 8, 2021, to January 8, 2025. The series is licensed in English by Seven Seas Entertainment.

No.	Original release date	Original ISBN	North American release date	North American ISBN
1	November 8, 2021	978-4-396-76844-7	April 15, 2025	979-8-89373-137-8
Chapters 1–4
2	August 8, 2022	978-4-396-76863-8	August 5, 2025	979-8-89373-462-1
Chapters 5–8
Includes a special Interview between Tomoko Yamashita and Hitomi Takano
3	February 8, 2024	978-4-396-75040-4	December 9, 2025	979-8-89373-536-9
Chapters 9–13
4	January 8, 2025	978-4-396-75063-3	April 7, 2026	979-8-89561-779-3
Chapters 14–20

== Reception ==
The series was ranked second in the 2023 edition of Takarajimasha's Kono Manga ga Sugoi! guidebook list of the best manga for female readers. The series won 2022 Bros. Comic Award hosted by Tokyo News Service's TV Bros magazine.

== See also ==
- My Boy, another manga series by the same creator
