= Mari Okazaki =

Japanese manga artist

Mari Okazaki おかざき 真里
- Born: June 15, 1967 (age 59) Nagano, Japan
- Area: Manga artist

Mari Okazaki (おかざき 真里, Okazaki Mari; born June 15, 1967 in Nagano, Japan) is a Japanese manga artist.

== Life ==
Okazaki started drawing in high school and submitted her illustrations to different magazines. For her, this was both a training for art school, which she wanted to apply for, and a way to make money from the prize money. She had saved more than 1 million yen when graduating from high school. The magazine Fanroad by the publisher Rapport published her first manga. She enrolled in and graduated from Tama Art University with a major in design. After university, she worked for the advertising company Hakuhodo, doing conceptual and design work.

Her career as a manga artist became more successful in 1994, when she won a newcomers' award of Bouquet magazine, published the short story "Bathroom Gūwa" and started becoming a regular contributor for the magazine afterwards. Okazaki herself considers this to be her proper debut as a professional manga artist. She was a regular contributor for Cookie from its first issue, the successor to Bouquet. She continued working in advertising until 2001, when she decided to completely focus on her career as a manga artist. Her first longer series was Suppli, which she published from 2003 to 2009 in the josei magazine Feel Young and which is set in an advertising company. While working on Suppli, she gave birth to three children.

Okazaki worked occasionally for seinen magazines already in the early 2000s. From 2014 to 2021, her first longer series for a seinen magazine was published in Monthly Big Comic Spirits, the historical manga A-un. The series based on the lives of Buddhist monks Kūkai and Saichō is her most critically acclaimed work so far. It was commended by manga authors Ryoko Yamagishi, Yuki Suetsugu and Masami Yuki and writers Rio Shimamoto and Kazuki Kaneshiro. A-un was one of the Jury Recommended Works at the 23rd Japan Media Arts Festival in 2020.

Several of her manga, among them Kanojo ga Shinjatta and Shibuya ku Maruyama cho, have been adapted as live-action films or TV series. Her work has been translated into English, French and Polish.

== Works ==
Title	Year	Notes	Refs
Marine (マリーン, Marīn)	1988	Compiled in 1 vol.	
Tōchū Kasō (冬虫夏草)	1994	Compiled in 1 vol.	
Shutter Love (シャッターラブ, Shattā Rabu)	1998	Compiled in 1 vol.	
BX	1999	Compiled in 1 vol.	
Bathroom Gūwa (バスルーム寓話, Basurūmu Gūwa)	2000	Short story collection published by Shueisha in 1 vol.	
Kanojo ga Shinjatta (彼女が死んじゃった)	2000–01	Serialized in Business Jump compiled in 2 vol.	
Yawarakai Kara (やわらかい殻)	2001	Compiled in 1 vol.	
Sweat & Honey (セックスのあと男の子の汗はハチミツのにおいがする, Sekkusu no Ato Otokonoko no Ase wa Hachimitsu no Nioi ga Suru)	2002	Serialized in Zipper Comic; Compiled in 1 vol., translated into English by Tokyopop	
12 Kagetsu (12ヶ月)	2002–03	Compiled in 1 vol.	
Suppli (サプリ, Sapuri)	2003–09	Serialized in Feel Young; Compiled in 10 vol., translated into English by Tokyopop	
Shibuya ku Maruyama-cho (渋谷区円山町)	2003–04, 2007–09	Serialized in Cookie; Compiled in 4 vol.	
Gin ni Naru (銀になる)	2006	Compiled in 1 vol.	
Watakushi no Kekkonshiki! (私の結婚式!)	2006	Compiled in 1 vol.	
Suppli Extra (サプリExtra)	2010	Serialized in Feel Young; Compiled in 1 vol.	
&	2010–14	Serialized in Feel Young; Compiled in 14 vol.	
A-un (阿・吽)	2014–21	Serialized in Monthly Big Comic Spirits; Compiled in 14 vol.	
Will I Be Single Forever? (ずっと独身でいるつもり?, Zutto Dokushin de Iru Tsumori?)	2014–15	Serialized in Feel Young; Compiled in 1 vol., translated into English by Viz Media	
Kashimashi Meshi (かしましめし)	2016–present	Serialized in Feel Young; Compiled in 5 vol. (as of January 2023)	
Haibaiyōshi Mizuiro (胚培養士ミズイロ)	2022–present	Serialized in Big Comic Spirits; Compiled in 4 vol. (as of April 2024)	
