= Love My Life (manga) =

Japanese manga by Ebine Yamaji

- Genre: Romance, yuri
- Manga
- Written by: Ebine Yamaji
- Published by: Shodensha
- Magazine: Feel Young
- Original run: 2000 – 2001
- Volumes: 1
- Live-action film
- Directed by: Kōji Kawano
- Written by: Hiroko Kanesugi
- Music by: noodles
- Released: December 9, 2006
- Runtime: 96 min.

Love My Life is a Japanese manga series written and illustrated by Ebine Yamaji. It was originally serialized in the josei manga magazine Feel Young from 2000 to 2001, and collected in a single tankōbon volume released on September 8, 2001. The volume has been translated into Mandarin and released by Taiwan Kadokawa and is available internationally on several Asian online shops like YesAsia. A film based on the manga was produced in 2006, and the DVD was released on May 4, 2007, and was released in the United States by Wolfe Video. It was also screened in Los Angeles on December 2, 2007.

== Story ==
Ichiko Izumiya is an eighteen-year-old woman who studies language at university and works part-time at a music store. She lives with her father, Housei Izumiya, who translates English novels into Japanese for a living. Her mother died seven years before the story begins. Ichiko also has a girlfriend named Eri Joujima. When she comes out as a lesbian to her father, her father shocks her by telling her that both he and her mother are also gay. They wanted to raise a child, and agreed to marry in name to raise a child in Japan, while being in their own respective relationships. The rest of the story shows Ichiko meeting her parents' lovers, living her daily life, and continuing her relationship with Eri.

== Characters / Film cast ==
Theatrical release poster

- Ichiko Izumiya (Rei Yoshii)
- Eri Joujima (Asami Imajuku)
- Housei Izumiya (Ira Ishida)
- Take-chan (Issei Takahashi)
- Yukako (Kami Hiraiwa)
- Akira (Takamasa Suga)
- Customer at CD Shop (Chiharu Kawai)
- Eri's father (Ken Teraizumi)
- Chinami (Naomi Akimoto)
- Kengo Tachibana (Hiroyuki Ikeuchi)
- Professor Saeko (Miyoko Asada)
- Ichiko's mother (Kyōko Koizumi)

== See also ==
- Tokyo International Lesbian & Gay Film Festival
