= Rainy Day Serenade =

Japanese manga series

- First tankōbon volume cover, featuring Takaaki (left) and Hina (right)

涙雨とセレナーデ (Namidaame to Serenāde)
- Genre: Romance; Science fiction
- Manga
- Written by: Haruka Kawachi
- Published by: Kodansha
- English publisher: NA: Kodansha USA
- Imprint: KC Kiss
- Magazine: Kiss
- Original run: November 25, 2014 – November 25, 2025
- Volumes: 14
- Manga

Gaiden
- Written by: Haruka Kawachi
- Published by: Kodansha
- Imprint: KC Kiss
- Magazine: Kiss
- Original run: November 25, 2026 – scheduled
- Anime television series
- Directed by: Takashi Kamei
- Written by: Yōko Yonaiyama
- Studio: Tezuka Productions
- Original run: April 2027 – scheduled
- icon

Rainy Day Serenade (Japanese: 涙雨とセレナーデ, Hepburn: Namidaame to Serenāde) is a Japanese manga series written and illustrated by Haruka Kawachi. It was serialized in Kodansha's josei manga magazine Kiss from November 2014 to November 2025, with its chapters collected in 14 tankōbon volumes. An anime television series adaptation produced by Tezuka Productions is set to premiere in April 2027.

== Synopsis ==
Whenever it rains, Hina dreams about her younger self playing with a boy she's unsure if she's seen before. Later she meets the boy whose name is Takaaki, but unintentionally time travels to Meiji era Japan while being grabbed onto by him. At the same time, Takaaki mistakes her for his fiancée Hinako.

== Characters ==
Hina Katagiri (片桐 陽菜, Katagiri Hina)
Voiced by: Yume Miyamoto
Takaaki Hongō (本郷 孝章, Hongō Takaaki)
Voiced by: Takeo Ōtsuka

== Media ==
=== Manga ===
Written and illustrated by Haruka Kawachi, Rainy Day Serenade was serialized for an eleven-year run in Kodansha's josei manga magazine Kiss from November 25, 2014, to November 25, 2025. Its individual chapters were compiled into fourteen tankōbon volumes released from October 13, 2015 to February 13, 2026. In January 2026, Kodansha USA announced that they had licensed the series for English publication in a 2-in-1 omnibus, with the first omnibus set to release in January 2027.

A spin-off series is set to begin serialization in Kiss on November 25, 2026.

No.	Original release date	Original ISBN	English release date	English ISBN
1	October 13, 2015	978-4-06-377328-6	January 19, 2027	979-8-88877-925-5
2	October 13, 2016	978-4-06-393049-8	January 19, 2027	979-8-88877-925-5
3	November 13, 2017	978-4-06-510454-5	June 15, 2027	979-8-88877-926-2
4	September 13, 2018	978-4-06-512876-3	June 15, 2027	979-8-88877-926-2
5	July 12, 2019	978-4-06-516383-2	—	—
6	May 13, 2020	978-4-06-519605-2	—	—
7	December 11, 2020	978-4-06-521628-6	—	—
8	August 12, 2021	978-4-06-524521-7	—	—
9	March 11, 2022	978-4-06-526926-8	—	—
10	October 13, 2022	978-4-06-529288-4	—	—
11	August 10, 2023	978-4-06-532466-0	—	—
12	June 13, 2024	978-4-06-535893-1	—	—
13	April 11, 2025	978-4-06-539210-2	—	—
14	February 13, 2026	978-4-06-542491-9	—	—

=== Anime ===
An anime television series adaptation was announced on February 13, 2026. It will be produced by Tezuka Productions and directed by Takashi Kamei, with series composition handled by Yōko Yonaiyama and characters designed by Nobuteru Yūki. The series is set to premiere in April 2027.

== Reception ==
The series has been recommended by manga artist Kana Ozawa, and manga critic Mei Chan.

== See also ==
- Natsuyuki Rendezvous, another manga series by the same creator
