= Maki Kusumoto =

Japanese manga artist

Maki Kusumoto (Japanese: 楠本まき, Hepburn: Kusumoto Maki; July 15, 1967, in Kanagawa Prefecture, Japan) is a Japanese manga artist. Kusumoto's works are known for being psychological dramas focusing on death and romance between androgynous characters. Her minimalist aesthetics, darker themes, and preference for abstraction are all a big draw to her manga. She portrays willowy and long-limbed characters with unclear gender characteristics, who struggle with their inner demons in the harsh reality of everyday life.

== Early life ==
Kusumoto started her manga art work at the early age of 16. Following a two year break from drawing to study for her entrance exams to university, she studied philosophy at the Ochanomizu Women's University in Tokyo. She eventually quit her studies there to make time for her manga work. She takes some of her inspiration from her studies of philosophy and the work of British illustrator Aubrey Beardsley said to have worked closely with Oscar Wilde. Her first professionally released manga was published in 1984 in Margaret, one of Japan's most popular Japanese manga magazines (shōjo). She lives in London.

== Works ==
- 1988 Ao no kaihou -The Release from Blue- (Shueisha)
- 1989 HOT HOT HOT (Shueisha)
- 1989–1991 Kiss xxxx (5 Bände, Shueisha)
- 1993 T.V. eye (Shueisha)
- 1994–1995 K no souretsu -The Funeral Procession of K- (2 Bände, Shueisha)
- 1997 Hikarabita taiji -Embryons desséchés (Shinshokan)
- 1998 Ikasamaumigame no soup -Mock turtle soup- (Shinshokan)
- 1998 Die tödliche Dolis (Shodensha)
- 2000 anbiseikatsu hyakka\ -An Encyclopedia for People under an Obsession with Beautiful Things- (Shueisha)
- 2001 RENAITAN -A serious LOVE STORY- (PARCO)
- 2002 Love, egg and catastrophe (Shodensha)
- 2003 Two decades (Shinshokan)
- 2004 Eggnog (Shodensha)

Kusumoto illustrated the cover of Zi:Kill's 1990 album Close Dance.

== Dolis ==
Dolis is one of her most famous works featuring a female protagonist named Mitsu who is known as the ideal girl. The male protagonist, Kishi falls for her in a classic romance but quickly learns there is more to Mitsu than meets the eye. The protagonists take a slow descent into mentally taxing and darker realms that display the realities of love, heartbreak, and obsession. Dolis is considered a Josei manga or one shot.
