= Love My Life =

Love My Life may refer to:

- Love My Life (manga), a 2001 Japanese josei manga by Ebine Yamaji
- "Love My Life" (song), a 2016 song by Robbie Williams
