= Morizono =

Morizono (written: 森薗) is a Japanese surname. Notable people with the surname include:

- Masataka Morizono (森薗 政崇, born 1995), Japanese table tennis player
- Milk Morizono (森園 みるく, born 1957), Japanese manga artist
- Misaki Morizono (森薗 美咲, born 1992), Japanese table tennis player
