= Gozen 3-ji no Muhōchitai =

Japanese manga series

午前3時の無法地帯
- Manga
- Written by: Yōko Nemu
- Published by: Shodensha
- Magazine: Feel Young
- Original run: 2008 – 2009
- Volumes: 3
- Manga

Gozen 3-ji no Kikenchitai
- Written by: Yōko Nemu
- Original run: 2010 – 2011
- Volumes: 4
- Manga

Gozen 3-ji no Fukyōwaon
- Written by: Yōko Nemu
- Published: 2012
- Volumes: 1

Gozen 3-ji no Muhōchitai (Japanese: 午前3時の無法地帯; lit. "3 a.m. Lawless Zone") is a Japanese manga series written and illustrated by Yōko Nemu. The manga was published in Shodensha's Feel Young magazine between 2008 and 2009, with three tankōbon volumes. The first sequel to the manga, Gozen 3-ji no Kikenchitai (午前3時の危険地帯; lit. "3 a.m. Danger Zone"), was compiled into four volumes between 2010 and 2011, while the second one, Gozen 3-ji no Fukyōwaon (午前3時の不協和音; lit. "3 a.m. Discord"), was released into a single volume in 2012.

It was adapted into a live-action series that debuted on March 20, 2013. It had 12 episodes, each with 12 minutes.

== Cast ==
- Tsubasa Honda as Momoko
- Joe Odagiri as Tagaya
- Sho Aoyagi as Wajima
- Haruka Kinami as Endō
- Soukou Wada as Dōmoto
- Tasuku Nagaoka as Taki
- Shohei Uno as Tanabe
- Aoba Kawai as Mano
- Masahiro Usui as Tamotsu
- Izumi Fujimoto as Kēko
- Aoi Nakabeppu as Yuka
- Jun Yoshinaga as Haruka
