= Onna no Ko ga Iru Basho wa =

Japanese manga series

- Cover of the volume

女の子がいる場所は
- Manga
- Written by: Ebine Yamaji
- Published by: Enterbrain
- Imprint: Beam Comix
- Magazine: Comic Beam
- Original run: December 10, 2021 – May 12, 2022
- Volumes: 1

Onna no Ko ga Iru Basho wa (女の子がいる場所は) is a Japanese manga series written and illustrated by Ebine Yamaji. It was serialized in Enterbrain's seinen manga magazine Comic Beam from December 2021 to May 2022, with its chapters collected in a single tankōbon volume.

== Synopsis ==
The series is an anthology centered around young girls from different countries including Saudi Arabia, India, Afghanistan, Morocco, and Japan, their ways of life, the struggles they face as girls, and their religious practices.

== Publication ==
Written and illustrated by Ebine Yamaji, Onna no Ko ga Iru Basho wa was serialized in Enterbrain's seinen manga magazine Comic Beam from December 10, 2021, to May 12, 2022. Its chapters were collected in a single tankōbon volume released on June 10, 2022.

No.	Release date	ISBN
1	June 10, 2022	978-4-04-737096-8

== Reception ==
The series was ranked fourth in the 2023 edition of Takarajimasha's Kono Manga ga Sugoi! guidebook's list of the best manga for female readers. The series was also ranked fourth in Freestyle magazine's "The Best Manga" 2023 edition. The series won the Short Work Prize at the 27th Tezuka Osamu Cultural Prize in 2023.
