= Feel Young =

Japanese manga magazine

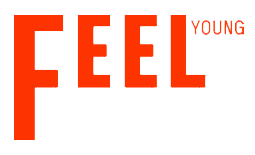

- Cover of the July 2019 issue of Feel Young, published by Shodensha
- Categories: Josei manga
- Frequency: Monthly
- Circulation: Unknown (Note: No figures have been reported by the Japanese Magazine Publishers Association since July 2020.)
- Publisher: Shodensha
- First issue: 1989
- Country: Japan
- Based in: Tokyo
- Language: Japanese
- Website: feelyoung.jp

Feel Young (Japanese: フィールヤング) is a monthly josei manga magazine published by Shodensha since 1989. Manga artists whose stories have run in the magazine include Moyoco Anno, Mitsue Aoki, Mitsukazu Mihara, Kiriko Nananan, Mari Okazaki, Erica Sakurazawa, Ebine Yamaji, and others.

== Profile and relevance ==
The magazine was first published in 1989. When the magazine emerged in the late 1980s, it was part of a new wave of josei magazines like Young Rose and Cutie Comics, publishing manga like the ones of Kyoko Okazaki that distanced themselves from the soap-opera "Ladies Comics" of the 1980s and kept more elements of shōjo manga in their style. Rachel Thorn explains that the magazine is considered more artsy and progressive than other josei magazines like the more conservative You or the more mainstream Chorus. Some women who got works published in the artistic manga magazine Garo, like Erica Sakurazawa, Kiriko Nananan and Shungicu Uchida, published their works also in Feel Young. The manga artist Milk Morizono described that she felt like her work was sometimes out of place, because it was too dark for the light pages of the magazine.

In 1995, it had a circulation of 250,000, in the following year 150,000. In 2004, an issue of the magazine had a circulation around 72,000.

In 2024, a website counterpart called Our Feel was launched.

== Serialized manga ==
=== 1990s ===
- The Rules of Love by Erica Sakurazawa (1993–1994)
- IC in a Sunflower by Mitsukazu Mihara (1994–1997)
- Nothing But Loving You by Erica Sakurazawa (1994–1995)
- Helter Skelter by Kyoko Okazaki (1995–1997)
- Happy Mania by Moyoco Anno (1996–2001)
- Sayonara Midori-chan by Kyūta Minami (1996–1997)
- Dolis by Maki Kusomoto (1998)
- Doll by Mitsukazu Mihara (1998–2002)
- Angel Nest by Erica Sakurazawa (1999–2000)

=== 2000s ===
- Love My Life by Ebine Yamaji (2000–2001)
- Hagane no Musume by Yōko Kondō (2001–2002)
- The Embalmer by Mitsukazu Mihara (2002–2013)
- New Hana no Asuka-gumi! by Satosumi Takaguchi (2003–2009)
- Piece of Cake by George Asakura (2003–2008)
- Suppli by Mari Okazaki (2003–2009)
- Bunny Drop by Yumi Unita (2005–2011)
- Gozen 3-ji no Muhōchitai by Yōko Nemu (2008–2009)
- Natsuyuki Rendezvous by Haruka Kawachi (2009–2012)
- Her by Tomoko Yamashita (2009–2010)

=== 2010s ===
- Suppli Extra by Mari Okazaki (2010)
- & by Mari Okazaki (2010–2014)
- Ayame-kun no Nonbiri Nikushoku Nisshi by Mai Machi (2012–present)
- Chūgakusei Nikki by Junko Kawakami (2013–present)
- Memoirs of Amorous Gentlemen by Moyoco Anno (2013–2018)
- Will I Be Single Forever? (2014–2015) by Mari Okazaki
- Ghost of Undecimber by Suzume Takano (2015–2016)
- White Note Pad by Tomoko Yamashita (2015–2016)
- Piece of Cake: Bangai-hen by George Asakura (2015)
- Ii ne! Hikaru Genji-kun by Est Em (2015–2021)
- Kashimashi Meshi by Mari Okazaki (2016–present)
- Kichijitsu Goyomi by Hisae Iwaoka (2017–present)
- Ikoku Nikki by Tomoko Yamashita (2017–2023)
- My Androgynous Boyfriend by Tamekō (2018–2023)

=== 2020s ===
- Onna no Sono no Hoshi by Yama Wayama (2020–present)
- The Reason We Fall in Love by ma2 (2020–2023; transferred to Line Manga)
- Golden Raspberry by Aki Mochida (2020–present)
- Kocchi Muite yo Mukai-kun by Yōko Nemu (2020–present)
- Gene Bride by Hitomi Takano (2021–present)
- Your Own Quiz by Ayako Noda (2022–present)
