= Bunny Drop =

Manga

- Cover of Volume 1 as published by Shodensha, featuring Rin

うさぎドロップ (Usagi Doroppu)
- Genre: Comedy drama; Coming-of-age; Slice of life
- Manga
- Written by: Yumi Unita
- Published by: Shodensha
- English publisher: NA / UK: Yen Press
- Magazine: Feel Young
- Original run: October 2005 – April 2011
- Volumes: 10
- Manga

Usagi Drop: Bangaihen
- Written by: Yumi Unita
- Published by: Shodensha
- English publisher: NA / UK: Yen Press
- Magazine: Feel Young
- Original run: July 2011 – December 2011
- Volumes: 1
- Anime television series
- Directed by: Kanta Kamei
- Written by: Taku Kishimoto
- Music by: Suguru Matsutani
- Studio: Production I.G
- Licensed by: AUS: Siren Visual; NA: NIS America; UK: MVM Films
- Original network: Fuji TV (noitamina)
- Original run: July 7, 2011 – September 15, 2011
- Episodes: 11
- Live-action film
- Bunny Drop
- icon

Bunny Drop (Japanese: うさぎドロップ, Hepburn: Usagi Doroppu) is a Japanese manga series by Yumi Unita. The plot follows thirty-year-old Daikichi as he becomes the guardian of Rin, the illegitimate six-year-old daughter of his grandfather. Bunny Drop was serialized in Shodensha's monthly josei manga magazine Feel Young from October 2005 to April 2011. Its chapters were collected into nine wide-ban volumes by Shodensha. The series has been licensed for English language release by Yen Press.

An anime adaptation by Production I.G was broadcast in Japan between July and September 2011. A live-action film adaptation premiered in August 2011. A spin-off series, titled Usagi Drop: Bangaihen, was serialized in Feel Young from July 2011 to December 2011 and collected in one volume.

== Plot ==
When 30-year-old Daikichi Kawachi returns home for his grandfather's funeral he learns about the existence of Rin Kaga, his grandfather's illegitimate six-year-old daughter by an unknown mother. The girl is an embarrassment to all his relatives and is treated like an outcast.

Annoyed by their attitudes, Daikichi decides to take care of Rin himself, even though he is single and has no experience in raising a child. As Rin becomes part of his life, Daikichi experiences the hardships of being a single parent. He is befriended by the single mother of Kouki Nitani, a young boy who Rin meets in nursery school, who gives him advice on raising Rin. After a year has passed, Daikichi acknowledges his sacrifices for Rin have been worth it. The first half of the series focuses on Daikichi's perspective and struggles raising Rin.

Ten years later, Rin is a high school student and the remainder of the series focuses on her trying to figure out how to deal with her feelings for Kouki, and her decision for a career. Rin discovers that she is not actually related to Daikichi by blood, and the series ends with Rin and Daikichi falling in love.

The anime and live-action adaptations do not depict this revelation, and instead end before the time skip.

== Characters ==
Daikichi Kawachi (河地 大吉, Kawachi Daikichi)
Daikichi is a 30-year-old single man and the adoptive guardian of Rin. With Rin living in his home, Daikichi quits smoking, cleans his house, and reluctantly cuts back on work hours. Despite his irresponsible life style, Daikichi is a very hard worker and considered the best in his department. He is insecure about raising Rin, always asking his co-workers or Yukari for guidance. Yumi Unita stated some events Daikichi faced when raising Rin were based on her personal experiences. It appears that he has romantic feelings for Yukari. He is voiced by Hiroshi Tsuchida in the Japanese dub of the anime, and portrayed by Kenichi Matsuyama in the live action film.
Rin Kaga (鹿賀 りん, Kaga Rin)
Rin is a six-year-old girl and thought to be the illegitimate daughter of Daikichi's grandfather, Souichi Kaga (鹿賀 宋一, Kaga Sōichi) and manga artist Masako Yoshii (吉井 正子, Yoshii Masako). Masako abandoned her for the sake of her career. She is strongly independent and mature, often dealing with issues on her own. Living with Daikichi, she develops a fondness of cooking for him. Rin begins to wrestle with her feelings when Kouki starts wanting to have a deeper relationship with her. Rin comes to realize that she loves Daikichi, but is hesitant to pursue a relationship because they are related. Near the end of the series, however, Rin learns from her mother that Daikichi is not her biological nephew, and that Souichi who was Daikichi's grandfather had only adopted her. After this she opts to stay with Daikichi for life and marry him. Her child self is voiced by Ayu Matsuura in the Japanese dub of the anime, and portrayed by Mana Ashida in the live-action film.
Kouki Nitani (二谷 コウキ, Nitani Kōki)
Kouki is a boy Rin befriended in her daycare. He is an immature brat, but has grown fond of Rin as they are both raised by a single parent. When they are teenagers, Kouki desires to pursue a deeper relationship with Rin. Kouki later realizes that Rin loves Daikichi and works to help her confess her feelings to him, consistently acting for her best interest despite himself. His child self is voiced by Noa Sakai in the Japanese dub of the anime, and portrayed by Ruiki Satō in the live-action film.
Yukari Nitani (二谷 ゆかり, Nitani Yukari)
Yukari is an attractive 32-year-old divorced (widowed in the live action film) woman who is Kouki's mother. She gives guidance to Daikichi Kawachi on raising Rin. In the live action film it is said that her husband died in a car accident, which is shown when her son Kouki and Rin went to visit both of their fathers graves at the cemetery. Yukari is voiced by Sayaka Ohara in the Japanese dub of the anime, and portrayed by Karina in the live-action film.

== Media ==
=== Manga ===
Bunny Drop was written and illustrated by Yumi Unita. The untitled chapters were serialized by Shodensha in the monthly josei manga magazine Feel Young between October 2005 and April 2011. Part one, which is collected in the first four volumes, concluded in the April 2008 issue, with part two (which skips ahead ten years) beginning thereafter. The chapters were collected in nine wide-ban volumes, the final volume released on July 8, 2011. A spin-off series, also by Unita, entitled Usagi Drop: Bangaihen was serialized in Feel Young from July 2011 to December 2011 and collected in one volume.

The series has been licensed in English by Yen Press and in French by Delcourt. Yen Press has published the nine volumes as of August 20, 2013, and the Usagi Drop: Bangaihen volume was released on April 22, 2014, as the tenth and final volume.

=== Live-action film ===
In June 2010, production on a live-action film adaption of the manga was announced. The film was directed by Sabu and was released in Japanese theaters on August 20, 2011.

=== Anime ===
An anime television series adaptation of the manga produced by Production I.G aired on the noitaminA timeslot on Fuji TV between July 7, 2011, and September 15, 2011. Toho, Fuji TV, SMEJ, Dentsu and Shodensha were also involved in the production of the series. In addition, the series could be watched on Kansai TV (July 13 – September 21), Tokai TV (July 15 – September 23), TV Nishinippon (July 21 – September 22, every two weeks, two episodes per day, last three episodes on September 22), BS Fuji (August 7 – October 23) and Hokkaido Cultural Broadcasting (October 10 - December). The series was also simulcast by Crunchyroll and Anime News Network. The series was released on four Blu-ray Disc/DVD volumes between October 28, 2011, and January 27, 2012, each containing a bonus mini-episode. The opening theme is "Sweet Drop" by Puffy AmiYumi whilst the ending theme is "High High High" by Kasarinchu. The anime has been licensed by NIS America who released the series on Blu-ray and DVD combo pack including an artbook and extras on August 7, 2012.

==== Episode list ====
No.	Title	Directed by	Original release date
1	"The Rindō Flower Girl"; Transliteration: "Rindō no Onnanoko" (Japanese: りんどうの女の子)	Kanta Kamei	July 7, 2011
After hearing that his grandfather, Souichi Kaga, has died, Daikichi Kawachi and his relatives gather at Souichi's home for the funeral. There, he meets a young girl named Rin, who is allegedly Souichi's illegitimate daughter. Following the funeral, the relatives refuse to take in the girl and opt to put her up for adoption. Daikichi, disgusted with their attitudes, decides to take Rin into his care.
2	"Pinky Swear"; Transliteration: "Yubi Kiri Genman" (Japanese: ゆび切りげんまん)	Yoshiaki Kyougoku	July 14, 2011
While shopping for clothes, Daikichi realizes he needs to register Rin for school. With help from his cousin, Haruko Maeda, Daikichi finds a temporary nursery school to look after Rin while he goes to work. However, Daikichi ends up having to work overtime, causing him to be late in picking Rin up, though she forgives him. As time passes, Daikichi becomes concerned that his new schedule may start affecting his life at work, where he is keeping Rin a secret.
3	"Daikichi's Decision"; Transliteration: "Daikichi no Kimeta Koto" (Japanese: ダイキチの決めたこと)	Rokou Ogiwara	July 21, 2011
As Daikichi juggles his work with his responsibilities in taking care of Rin, he takes her to his parents' house. As Daikichi looks through Souichi's house for clues about Rin's mother, he finds an out-of-place modem. When he asks Rin about it, she mentions a maid named Masako Yoshii, who was listed in Rin's health booklet. When Rin wets the bed again that night, Daikichi understands her fear of death and reassures her. The next day, Daikichi requests a transfer at his job to better fit his time around Rin.
4	"Letter"; Transliteration: "Tegami" (Japanese: てがみ)	Susumu Mitsunaka	July 28, 2011
At school, Rin makes friends with a boy named Kouki Kitani, with Daikichi later meeting his single mother, Yukari. Daikichi's workmates hold a farewell party for him, which he brings Rin along to. After enrolling Rin into elementary school, Daikichi looks through her health record and manages to find Souichi's will, containing Masako's contact details. After buying Rin a desk, Daikichi decides to call Masako.
5	"Daikichi Should Stay Daikichi"; Transliteration: "Daikichi wa Daikichi de Ii" (Japanese: ダイキチはダイキチでいい)	Yoshitaka Koyama	August 4, 2011
Daikichi arranges a meeting with Masako, who explains that she gave Rin up due to her demanding work as a manga artist. She suggests that Rin should use Daikichi's family name to avoid castigation by her classmates. Daikichi runs this past Rin, who states that she wants to keep her surname, which he obliges.
6	"My Tree"; Transliteration: "Watashi no Ki" (Japanese: わたしの木)	Yoshikazu Ui	August 11, 2011
To commemorate her entrance into elementary school, Daikichi and Rin plant a loquat plant in their garden. Later, Rin wonders if there was a tree planted for her birth, so Daikichi goes to ask Masako about it, who reveals a tree was planted at Souichi's place. He finds the tree, a fragrant olive tree just like the one that was planted for his birth, and he brings it back to his place.
7	"Secretly Leaving Home"; Transliteration: "Naisho de Iede" (Japanese: ないしょで家出)	Susumu Mitsunaka	August 18, 2011
Daikichi's cousin, Haruko Maeda, appears on his doorstep alongside her daughter, Reina, saying she has run away from home following troubles dealing with her husband's family. As Reina enjoys spending time with Rin, Haruko laments her bottled up feelings to Daikichi. After spending a few nights at Daikichi's place, Haruko's husband comes to pick them up, with Haruko saying she plans to keep at it.
8	"Grandpa's Precious Thing"; Transliteration: "Ojīchan no Daiji" (Japanese: おじいちゃんのだいじ)	Ryutaro Sakaguchi	August 25, 2011
On a hot summer day, Daikichi and Rin go to visit Souichi's grave. There, Daikichi notices that Masako is also present, so he goes to find Masako and tell her that Rin is there, offering a chance to look at her secretly. Afterwards, Daikichi and Rin go to see Souichi's house, now owned by his uncle, where they find the yard has been replaced with gravel. After returning home to celebrate Rin's birthday, they go to a summer festival.
9	"A Typhoon Came"; Transliteration: "Tai-fū ga Kita!" (Japanese: たいふうがきた!)	Yoshikazu Ui	September 1, 2011
As the town receives a typhoon alert, Daikichi contemplates investing in some insurance while Rin keeps control of Kouki during class. As the storm arrives, Yukari and Kouki stay over with Daikichi and Rin for dinner.
10	"Stomach Flu"; Transliteration: "Onaka no Kaze" (Japanese: おなかのかぜ)	Yoshitaka Koyama	September 8, 2011
After Daikichi goes to an exhibition at Rin's school where he meets some other fathers, he discovers that Rin has a stomach flu. With Rin refusing to eat or drink and her fever rising, Daikichi becomes worried, but Yukari manages to help him out. After Rin recovers from her fever, Daikichi learns that Yukari has come down with a cold.
11	"The First Step"; Transliteration: "Hajime no Ippo" (Japanese: はじめの一歩)	Yoshikazu Ui	September 15, 2011
Daikichi helps look after Kouki while Yukari recovers from her cold. Later, Rin practises for a skipping rope contest, with Daikichi joining in so he can lose some weight. After the contest, Daikichi takes Rin to see his parents, where one of Rin's wobbly teeth comes out. Daikichi also talks with his sister, reminding himself of the words of wisdom given to him by Yukari and his adult friends. On the way home, Daikichi reflects on the past year he has spent with Rin.

==== Bonus episodes ====
No.	Title	Original release date
2.5	"Leaf Aquarium"; Transliteration: "Happa no Suizokukan" (Japanese: はっぱの水族館)	October 28, 2011
Rin takes an interest in making fish out of leaves.
3.5	"Dear Santa"; Transliteration: "Santa-san E" (Japanese: サンタさんへ)	November 25, 2011
Daikichi and Rin prepare for Christmas.
6.5	"Full Blossom in the Skies"; Transliteration: "Osora ni Mankai" (Japanese: お空にまんかい)	December 16, 2011
As the cherry trees are in full blossom, Rin wants to go flower watching, and Kouki's mother prepares a bentou for this purpose. But the weather forecast announces a spring storm, so Rin and Daikichi make good-weather charms.
8.5	"The Road Home"; Transliteration: "Kaeri Michi" (Japanese: かえり道)	January 27, 2012
After visiting a festival, Kouki is still not tired, so Daikichi suggests a little detour on their way home, thus showing Rin, Kouki and Yukari his "secret place".

=== Appearances in other media ===
Rin and Daikichi appear in a downloadable content pack for the PlayStation Vita game Touch My Katamari, which was released in Japan on May 24, 2012.

== Reception ==
About.com's Deb Aoki praised the first volume for its "heartfelt drama and slice-of-life comedy", uncluttered artwork, storytelling, and the relationship between Daikichi and Rin. She notes that the artwork is a bit plain and simple. Danielle Leigh's also praised the art and the parent and child pair, calling the relationship moving and amusing. Comicsworthreading.com's Johanna Carlson commended the realism of Daikichi's character, as if he were an actual Japanese single father. She rated the first volume as one of the best manga of 2010. Carlson expressed appreciation for the small moments where Daikichi learns what it is to be a parent and states the series is unique to the manga market. The manga was a candidate for the 2011 Eisner Award in the Best U.S. Edition of International Material—Asia category.

However, the manga's ending where Daikichi and Rin enter into a romantic relationship was negatively received, citing the nature of the ending as incestuous and controversial, with many preferring to ignore the events not included in the animated or film adaptation.

== See also ==
- Sukimasuki, another manga series by the same author
