= A-un (manga) =

Japanese manga series

- First volume cover

阿・吽
- Genre: Historical
- Manga
- Written by: Mari Okazaki
- Published by: Shogakukan
- Magazine: Monthly Big Comic Spirits
- Original run: May 27, 2014 – May 27, 2021
- Volumes: 14
- icon

A-un (阿・吽) is a Japanese manga series written and illustrated by Mari Okazaki. The series is set in the Heian period and follows two prominent Buddhist monks: Saichō, who founded the Enryaku-ji temple, and Kūkai, who established the Mount Kōya temple. It was serialized in Shogakukan's seinen manga magazine Monthly Big Comic Spirits from May 2014 to May 2021.

== Publication ==
Written and illustrated by Mari Okazaki, A-un was serialized in Shogakukan's seinen manga magazine Monthly Big Comic Spirits from May 27, 2014, to May 27, 2021. Shogakukan collected its chapters in fourteen tankōbon volumes, released from October 10, 2014, to September 10, 2021.

=== Volumes ===
No.	Japanese release date	Japanese ISBN
1	October 10, 2014	978-4-09-186712-4
2	May 12, 2015	978-4-09-187104-6
3	December 8, 2015	978-4-09-187409-2
4	June 10, 2016	978-4-09-187704-8
5	January 12, 2017	978-4-09-189439-7
6	June 12, 2017	978-4-09-189592-9
7	January 12, 2018	978-4-09-189778-7
8	August 9, 2018	978-4-09-860096-0
9	February 12, 2019	978-4-09-860267-4
10	October 11, 2019	978-4-09-860504-0
11	March 12, 2020	978-4-09-860586-6
12	September 11, 2020	978-4-09-860734-1
13	February 12, 2021	978-4-09-860836-2
14	September 10, 2021	978-4-09-861101-0

== Reception ==
The series was commended by manga authors Ryoko Yamagishi, Yuki Suetsugu and Masami Yuki and writers Rio Shimamoto and Kazuki Kaneshiro. It was one of the Jury Recommended Works at the 23rd Japan Media Arts Festival in 2020.
