= My Boy (manga) =

Japanese manga series

- Cover of the first manga volume

私の少年 (Watashi no Shōnen)
- Genre: Drama
- Manga
- Written by: Hitomi Takano
- Published by: Futabasha (former); Kodansha (current)
- English publisher: NA: Vertical
- Magazine: Monthly Action; (December 25, 2015 – December 25, 2017); Weekly Young Magazine; (May 28, 2018 – October 26, 2020)
- Original run: December 25, 2015 – October 26, 2020
- Volumes: 9
- icon

My Boy (Japanese: 私の少年, Hepburn: Watashi no Shōnen) is a Japanese manga series written and illustrated by Hitomi Takano. It was first serialized in Futabasha's Monthly Action from December 2015 to December 2017. It was then transferred to Kodansha's Weekly Young Magazine, being serialized from May 2018 to October 2020. In North America, the manga is licensed for English release by Vertical.

== Plot ==
One spring, Satoko Tawada, a 30-year-old office worker for a sports manufacturer in Tokyo, meets a 12-year-old elementary school student named Mashu Hayami in a park near her home and teaches him soccer. Around the same time, she is invited out for drinks by her boss and former lover Fumitaka Shiikawa. Satoko accepts the invitation but is introduced to Shiikawa's fiancé in her seat. Shocked by Shiikawa's treatment, Satoko cries in front of Mashu, who comforts her. On the other hand, Mashu has a complicated family situation, and they come to interact outside of soccer practice. When Mashu's father finds out about their relationship, he is angry and asks Satoko's employer to punish her, and she is transferred to a branch office in Sendai.

Two years after her transfer, Satoko celebrates her 33rd birthday. That night, she happens to reunite with Mashu, who is in Sendai for his junior high school trip. Mashu gives her his contact information, and the two begin to interact again. Satoko is then asked by Shiikawa to join the project team he set up, and she decides to return to Tokyo.

The night of Satoko's return to Tokyo, Mashu confesses to her but is rejected on the basis that they are adult and child. Mashu is depressed but receives advice from Mayuko, Satoko's younger sister, and decides to face Satoko again. On the other hand, Satoko is driven by desire to improve Mashu's home environment but finds out that it improved once he entered junior high school. Satoko realizes that her desire to save Mashu was a pretext, and she really just wanted to be by his side.

== Characters ==
Satoko Tawada (多和田 聡子, Tawada Satoko)
Office lady for the sports manufacturer Yonesas. She is from Sendai, but moved to Tokyo for college and got a job at the Tokyo headquarters of Yonesas. When it is known that she is dating Mashu, she is dismissed, but Shiikawa transfers her to the Sendai branch instead. She was in the futsal club during college and teaches Mashu with that experience.
Mashu Hayami (早見 真修, Hayami Mashū)
A beautiful boy Satoko met in Tokyo. He had a bob cut in elementary school but cut it short in junior high school. His mother died when he was in elementary school and lives with his brother and father. After entering junior high school, he lives with the support of his grandmother because his father is away from home. He initially belongs to a soccer club, but he later quits on his father's orders and enters a cram school.
Fumitaka Shiikawa (椎川 文貴, Shīkawa Fumitaka)
Employee of sports manufacturer Yonesas. He works at the Tokyo headquarters and is Satoko's boss. He and Satoko belonged to the same futsal club in college, and they dated for a year.
Nao Ogata (小片 菜緒, Ogata Nao)
Daughter of Mashu's soccer club coach. She was in Mashu's class in elementary and junior high school, and they attend the same cram school. She had feelings for Mashu but was deeply hurt after conversing with Satoko and finding out he likes Satoko more than her.
Mayuko Tawada (多和田 真友子, Tawada Mayuko)
Satoko's younger sister. She lived in her parents' house in Sendai but becomes interested in Satoko and Mashu's relationship and moves to Tokyo with her sister.

== Publication ==
Written and illustrated by Hitomi Takano, My Boy was serialized in Futabasha's Monthly Action from December 25, 2015, to December 25, 2017. In April 2018, it was announced that the series would be transferred to Kodansha's Weekly Young Magazine, starting on May 28 of the same year, and despite being serialized in a weekly magazine, it would keep its monthly basis release. The manga finished on October 26, 2020. Futabasha collected its chapters in four tankōbon volumes, released from June 11, 2016, to December 12, 2017. Kodansha re-released these four volumes between June 6 and October 5, 2018, and published the ninth and final volume on December 4, 2020.

In North America, Vertical announced the English release of the manga in July 2017. The nine volumes were released from April 10, 2018, to May 10, 2022.

=== Volumes ===
No.	Original release date	Original ISBN	English release date	English ISBN
1	June 11, 2016 (Futabasha); June 6, 2018 (Kodansha)	978-4-575-84810-6 (Futabasha); 978-4-06-511683-8 (Kodansha)	April 10, 2018	978-1-945054-87-7
2	December 12, 2016 (Futabasha); July 6, 2018 (Kodansha)	978-4-575-84895-3 (Futabasha); 978-4-06-512030-9 (Kodansha)	July 17, 2018	978-1-945054-88-4
3	July 12, 2017 (Futabasha); August 6, 2018 (Kodansha)	978-4-575-85001-7 (Futabasha); 978-4-06-512053-8 (Kodansha)	March 12, 2019	978-1-947194-21-2
4	December 12, 2017 (Futabasha); October 5, 2018 (Kodansha)	978-4-575-85072-7 (Futabasha); 978-4-06-512052-1 (Kodansha)	May 21, 2019	978-1-947194-74-8
5	November 6, 2018	978-4-06-512756-8	September 10, 2019	978-1-947194-78-6
6	May 7, 2019	978-4-06-515466-3	July 14, 2020	978-1-949980-46-2
7	November 6, 2019	978-4-06-517736-5	April 20, 2021	978-1-949980-75-2
8	June 5, 2020	978-4-06-519983-1	November 16, 2021	978-1-647290-67-2
9	December 4, 2020	978-4-06-521702-3	May 10, 2022	978-1-647290-93-1

== Reception ==
By November 2018, the manga had 1.1 million copies in circulation. The series ranked sixth on the "Nationwide Bookstore Employees' Recommended Comics of 2017". The manga was nominated for the 10th Manga Taishō awards in January 2017, receiving 20 points from the Manga Taisho awards' "Executive Committee". The series placed third at the third Next Manga Awards in the comics division for manga published in print book format in 2017. The 2017 edition of Takarajimasha's Kono Manga ga Sugoi! guidebook ranked it second on its list of manga series for male readers.

== See also ==
- Gene Bride, another manga series by the same creator
