= Haibaiyōshi Mizuiro =

Japanese manga series

- First tankōbon volume cover

胚培養士ミズイロ
- Genre: Medical drama
- Manga
- Written by: Mari Okazaki
- Published by: Shogakukan
- Magazine: Weekly Big Comic Spirits
- Original run: October 3, 2022 – present
- Volumes: 11
- icon

Haibaiyōshi Mizuiro (Japanese: 胚培養士ミズイロ; lit. 'Light Blue Embryologist') is a Japanese manga series written and illustrated by Mari Okazaki. It has been serialized in Shogakukan's seinen manga magazine Weekly Big Comic Spirits since October 2022.

== Publication ==
Written and illustrated by Mari Okazaki, Haibaiyōshi Mizuiro started in Shogakukan's seinen manga magazine Weekly Big Comic Spirits on October 3, 2022. Shogakukan has collected its chapters into individual tankōbon volumes. The first volume was released on January 30, 2023. As of July 30, 2026, eleven volumes have been released.

=== Volumes ===
No.	Japanese release date	Japanese ISBN
1	January 30, 2023	978-4-09-861483-7
2	May 12, 2023	978-4-09-861810-1
3	September 12, 2023	978-4-09-862590-1
4	January 30, 2024	978-4-09-862721-9
5	May 30, 2024	978-4-09-862881-0
6	November 28, 2024	978-4-09-863118-6
7	April 30, 2025	978-4-09-863465-1
8	August 29, 2025	978-4-09-863601-3
9	November 28, 2025	978-4-09-863681-5
10	March 30, 2026	978-4-09-863869-7
11	July 30, 2026	978-4-09-864059-1

== Reception ==
The manga was ranked second for the second Crea Nighttime Manga Award in 2023. Along with Watashitachi wa Mutsū Renai ga Shitai, Haibaiyōshi Mizuiro ranked 30th on the 2023 "Book of the Year" list by Da Vinci magazine. The series ranked seventh on Takarajimasha's Kono Manga ga Sugoi! list of best manga of 2024 for male readers. It has been nominated for the 29th Tezuka Osamu Cultural Prize in 2025.
