= Joseimuke =

Japanese media aimed at women

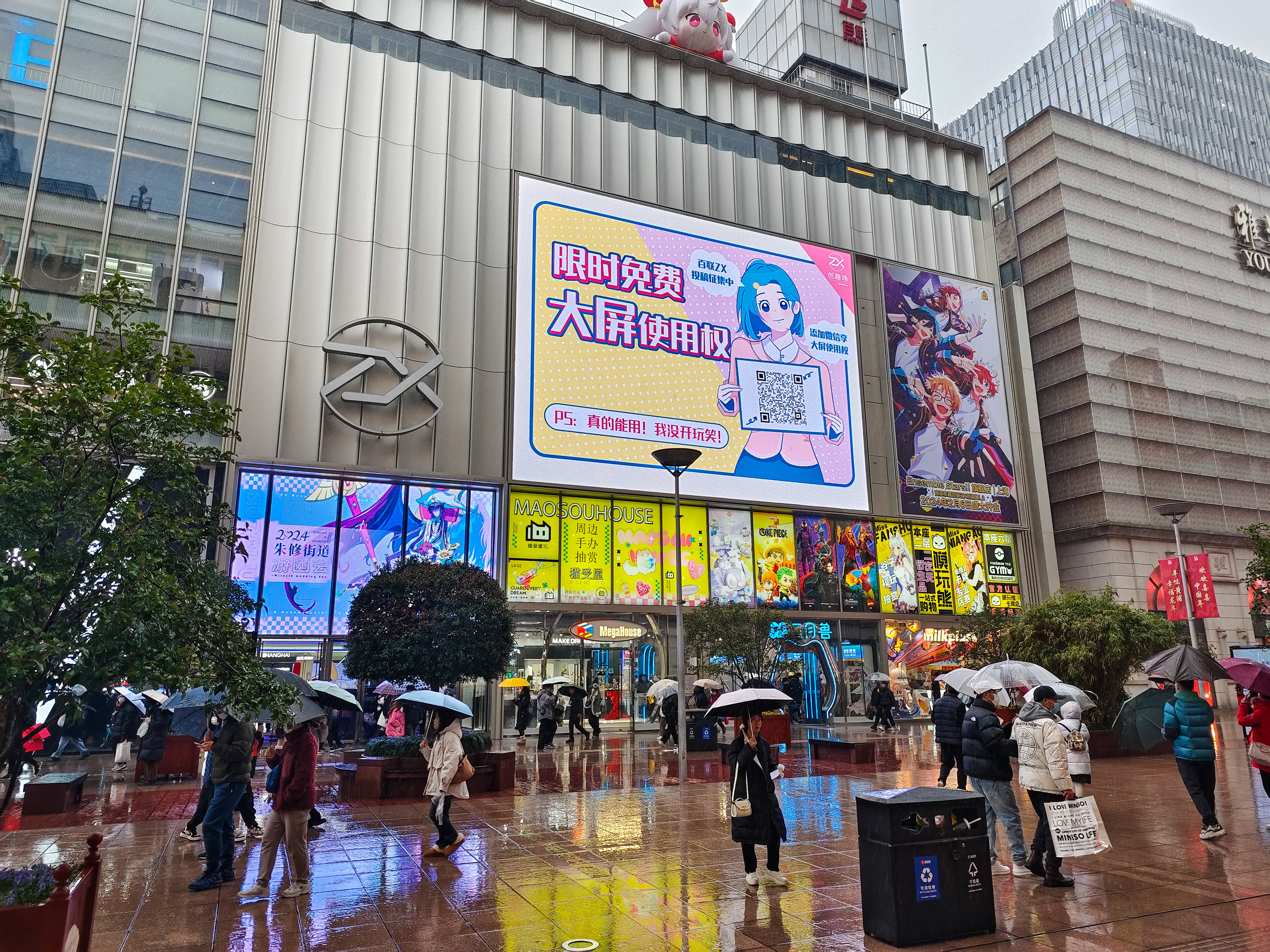
Bailian ZX Creative Center, a mall for ACG goods, in Shanghai displays a poster for Ensemble Stars, a joseimuke IP.

Joseimuke (女性向け) is a Japanese term that is used to refer to a category of media specifically intended to be "targeted towards women." The Japanese word joseimuke (女性向け) directly translates to "aimed at women," and joseimuke media includes but is not limited to video games, TV shows, comics, stage plays, or even pornography, though mostly tied to media in the ACG (anime, comics, games) community. Joseimuke itself is not a genre, but a media category, where the media forms under it can encompass various genres.

The category of joseimuke and its patterns originated in Japan around the late 1900s and first spread to other East Asian markets, such as those in China, Taiwan, and South Korea starting from the 1970s. Around the same time, joseimuke media in the form of translated shōjo or josei manga reached the West as a part of Japan's pop culture exports, but the term "joseimuke" was and still is not widely used for categorization.

According to popular understanding among stakeholders, joseimuke is a general term to refer to any media directed towards women, and is usually divided into three main sub-categories: romance (ex. otome games), boys' love (BL), and other media that don't fit into the previous two sub-categories, but are designed and/or marketed with a primarily female audience in mind. Oftentimes, this last sub-category will feature ensembles or casts of bishōnen (美少年), or "beautiful boys."

== History ==
The time of first usage of the term "joseimuke" as it is understood today is unclear, but the Chinese counterpart of the term was traced back as early as 1999 on a Chinese danmei forum. The Chinese form of the word, nǚxìng xìang (女性向), was borrowed directly from the original Japanese term of joseimuke (女性向け), suggesting the existence of the category in Japan around the late 1900s. Although the exact origin of the term is unclear, the creation and evolution of media aimed at women has a well-established history within Japanese visual pop culture.

=== The 1900s: The Rise of Women's Media ===
Media in Japanese visual pop culture that were created exclusively for women started gaining prominence as early as 1902 with shōjo magazines, the earliest of which being Shōjo Kai. These girls' magazines featured serialized novels and illustrations, elegant language, and frequently depicted passionate friendships between girls while embodying girls' values such as "purity, elegance, innocence, and chastity," according to Japanese Studies scholar Deborah Shamoon.

Shōjo manga as it is understood in modern times began to emerge in post-war Japan in the 1950s and 1960s with the publication of shōjo manga magazines that drew heavily from the culture of pre-war shōjo magazines. During this time, one of the leading shōjo manga artists in Japan was Takahashi Makoto, whose work was featured in two of the most popular shōjo manga magazines at the time – Shōjo and Nakayoshi. Women of all ages were drawn to these shōjo manga magazines and often purchased them alongside character merchandise illustrated by Takahashi. By the 1960s, more female artists started to appear on the shōjo manga scene, especially in amateur circles where female artists participated in contests held by weekly serialized magazines.

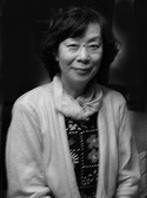
Hagio Moto, one of the most notable shōjo artists of the Year 24 Group.

The 1970s are often referred to as the 'Golden Age' of shōjo manga, a period during which many of the artistic styles, storytelling techniques, and thematic patterns that define modern shōjo media were established. Contemporary joseimuke media also trace many of their key elements back to the innovations that first gained popularity in shōjo manga during this era, such as the development of the BL genre. Central to the rapid development was the Year 24 Group – a generation of influential female shōjo manga artists named after the year around which they were born according to the Japanese gengō calendar. The Year 24 Group is credited with revolutionizing shōjo manga by expanding the genre and its narrative scope, incorporating more complex themes, such as gender identity and political upheaval, that mirrored the shifting dynamics of Japanese society at the time. Artists who are commonly included in the Year 24 Group include Moto Hagio, Keiko Takemiya, Yasuko Aoike, and Yumiko Ōshima among others.

Many of the artists in the Year 24 Group, most notably Moto Hagio and Keiko Takemiya, pioneered the shōnen-ai genre (later giving rise to Boys' Love), which was a subgenre of shōjo manga and depicted male same-sex romance often featuring beautiful, androgynous men that was made to appeal to a female audience. Before the Year 24 Group artists helped shape and popularize the shōnen-ai and BL genre within manga, the first work considered to embody modern Boys' Love themes was Koibitotachi no Mori (The Lovers' Forest), a 1961 novel by female author Mori Mari. Alongside her contemporary Nakajima Azusa (who wrote under the pen name Kurimoto Kaoru), Mori's writing contained many of the key tropes and European-inspired aesthetics that would go on to define Boys' Love media from the 1970s through the 1990s, including many of the shōnen-ai works of the Year 24 Group.

Another area in which boys' love media targeted towards females was being developed was in the specialty magazines and amateur fanzines (dōjinshi) of the late 1970s and 1980s. Fan circles and amateur creators involved in Japanese pop culture at the time often produced original and ani-paro (parodies and fan works based on existing animation or other original media) works. In the early 1980s, the term yaoi emerged from ani-paro communities as a Japanese acronym drawn from expressions meaning "no climax" (yama nashi), "no resolution" (ochi nashi), and "no meaning" (imi nashi) to refer to specific kinds of media, highlighting the minimal emphasis on plot in favor of explicit content in these works. "Yaoi" later became another way of referring to boys' love media made for women.

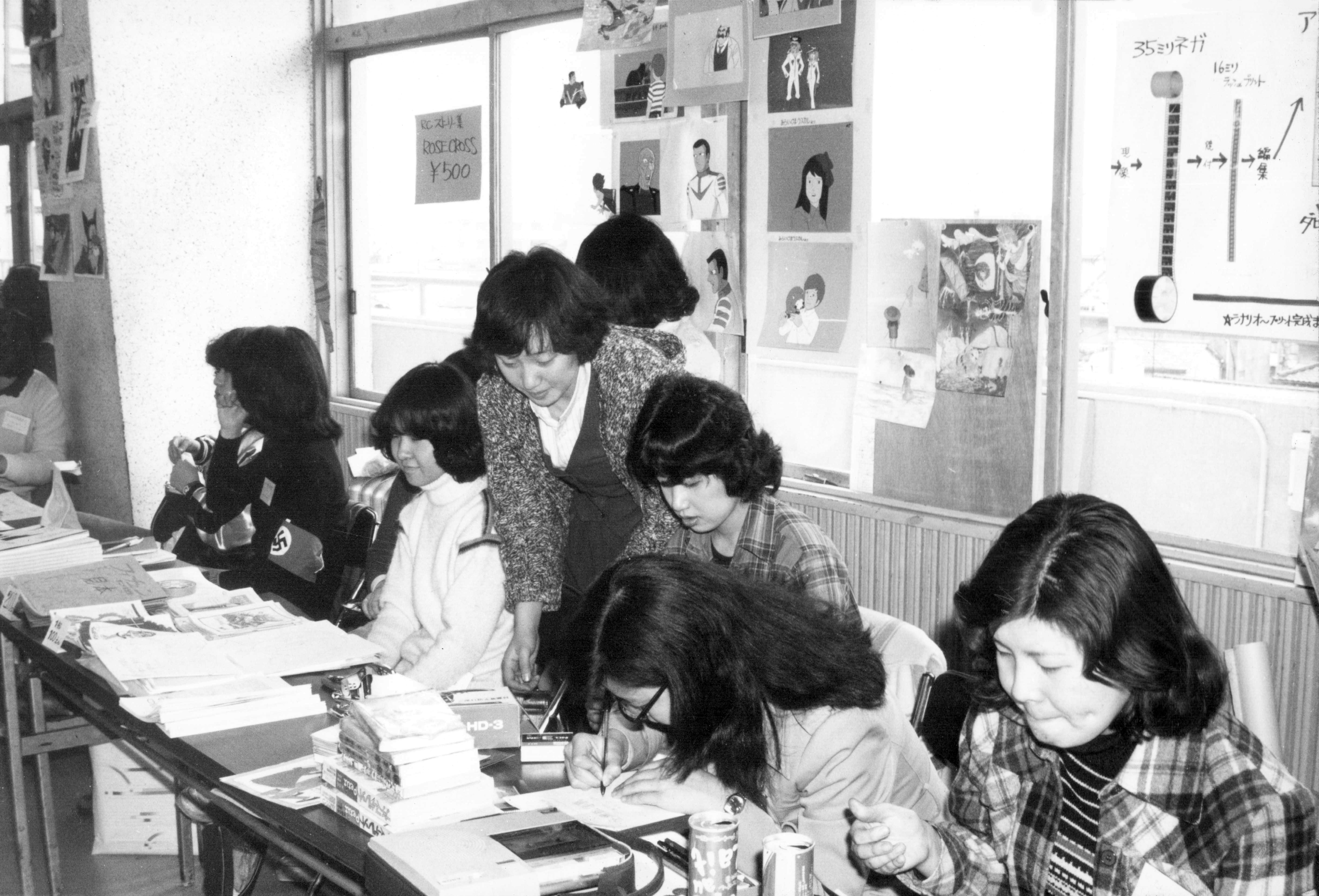
A scene from Comiket 8, which was held in April 1978

What would eventually become one of the most recognized specialty magazines for shōnen-ai, or boys' love, media was a literary magazine called JUNE established in 1982. Outside of amateur dōjinshi, JUNE was the only other channel through which new and amateur shōnen-ai/yaoi writers could share their work. However, the boom of the dōjinshi and amateur market in the late 1980s led many popular writers and artists, including shōnen-ai/yaoi creators, to shift away from publishing in mainstream magazines like JUNE, and move towards self-publishing or publishing in fanzines to sell at conventions. The oldest and largest dōjinshi convention, Tokyo Comic Market (Comiket), was first held in 1975. Later on in the 1990s as male-male romance media became more popular and commercialized, publishers started using the term "boys' love" (BL) to refer to the genre.

As the manga, anime, and dōjinshi industries developed, women increasingly established their presence by producing media specifically tailored to female audiences, which also influenced the market. For example, manga magazine Manpa was released in 1976, and in 1982 split off into a specialty amateur girls' manga magazine called Puff. Similarly, over time, dōjinshi sold at conventions and resale shops came to be broadly categorized as either danseimuke (aimed at men) or joseimuke (aimed at women), reflecting both the growing presence of female audiences and the industry's evolving efforts to organize around distinct audience demographics. Joseimuke dōjinshi commonly consist of a wide variety of genres, such as heterosexual romance, drama, humor, comedy, and BL, as opposed to danseimuke dōjinshi, which primarily depict heterosexual pornographic content.

With the manga boom and bubble economy in Japan in the 1980s, creation and consumption of manga expanded to include broader audiences. Branching from shōjo manga, a new female-oriented genre of manga emerged aimed specifically at adult women called Ladies' Comics (レディースコミック), or later, josei manga. Ladies' Comics (josei manga) can encompass a variety of genres, including sexually explicit content usually excluded from shōjo manga, and many center around depicting the daily lives of adult women, such as college students or working women, as they navigate relationships, responsibilities, and obstacles in society.

By the 1990s, female-centric works also made their way into the gaming sphere. The first joseimuke game is considered to be an otome game titled Angelique, which was released in 1994 for the Super Nintendo Entertainment System (Super NES). The game was developed by Ruby Party, an all-female development team within Koei, who were driven by honorary president Keiko Erikawa's goal of making a game for women by women. The game drew heavily from shōjo manga aesthetics and romance tropes and eventually spawned an engaged fanbase among female gamers. As these gamers generated fan activity for Angelique in dōjinshi circles and conventions, game developers and publishers began to take notice of the community of female gamers that had previously been overlooked. Angelique and its success as a female-oriented game paved the way for the continued development of otome games and the expansion of games for women.

=== The 2000s: Advancements in Joseimuke ===
The term joseimuke is intricately tied to the activities of female fans in ACG history and emerged alongside the evolution of female-oriented pop culture. Today, the word "joseimuke" is widely used in the electronic goods and ACG industry in the East to categorize and organize dōjinshi, games, media projects, and anime. Even major retailers like Animate now dedicate specific sections of their stores and websites to joseimuke content, reflecting its solidified presence in the industry.

== See also ==
- Chick lit
- Shōjo shōsetsu
