= Erica Sakurazawa =

Japanese manga author (born 1963)

- Born: 8 July 1963 (age 63); Tokyo, Japan
- Occupation: Manga artist

Erica Sakurazawa (桜沢 エリカ, Sakurazawa Erika; born 8 July 1963 in Tokyo, Japan) is a Japanese manga artist and essayist. Most of her works are published in josei magazines.

== Career ==
Sakurazawa grew up in Tokyo. As a child, she read shōjo manga by Yukari Ichijo, Keiko Takemiya and Ryoko Yamagishi.

During her second year of high school, she became interested in the lolicon erotic magazine Shōjo Alice, which was sold in vending machines. She personally visited the publisher with the goal of becoming a manga artist for them. She started her career as a professional manga artist in 1983 at the age of 19 with a yonkoma manga that she drew for an erotic magazine for men. Her early work for erotic and pulp manga magazines such as Manga Burikko is considered pioneering in the way it dealt directly with the sexuality of young women outside of the norms of shōjo manga. Together with other female artists who worked for hentai magazines such as Kyoko Okazaki, Shungicu Uchida and Yōko Kondo, she is sometimes referred to as "onna no ko H mangaka" ("women H cartoonists"). In 1987, she published short stories in the alternative manga magazine Garo.

Like Kyoko Okazaki, Sakurazawa shifted to publishing in manga in young ladies magazines such as Young You and especially Feel Young in the late 1980s. Since the 2000s, she is a regular contributor to the josei magazine Office You.

She writes autobiographic manga and manga essays about her life with her cats such as the long-running series Shippo ga Tomodachi. In 2000, she married a DJ and restaurant manager and gave birth to two children. When her husband became a stay-at-home dad and she kept focusing on her career, she made manga like Kyō mo Otenki based on her experience of giving birth as well as their romantic and parental life. The couple received media attention because of their lifestyle. Sakurazawa herself appears as a commentator on TV.

== Works ==
Title	Year	Notes	Refs
Kawaii Mono (かわいいもの)	1985	Serialized in Manga Burikko; Published by Byakuya Shobō in 1 vol.	
Mainichi ga Aki no Sora (毎日が秋の空)	1986	Serialized in Comic Burger; Published by Scholar in 1 vol.	
Cherry ni Omakase! (チェリーにおまかせ!)	1987	Published by Seirindō in 1 vol.	
Fools' Paradise (フールズ・パラダイス)	1987	Published by Kawade Shobō Shinsha in 1 vol.	
Yūbe no Natsu (ユウベノナツ)	1988	Published by Hakusensha in 1 vol.	
Dai Ren'ai Senkai (大恋愛専科)	1988	Published by Shueisha in 1 vol.	
Just Lovers (ジャスト・ラヴァーズ, Jasuto Ravāzu)	1989	Published by Magazine House in 1 vol.	
Shippo ga Tomodachi (シッポがともだち)	1989–2005	Serialized in You; Published by Shueisha in 7 vol.	
Love Stories (ラブ・ストーリーズ)	1990	Serialized in Young You; Published by Media Factory in 1 vol.	
Boku no Angel Dust (僕のエンジェル・ダスト)	1990	Published by Akita Shoten in 1 vol.	
Love So Special	1991	Published by Kadokawa Shoten in 1 vol.	
Makin' Happy (メイキン・ハッピィ)	1991–1993	Serialized in Feel Young; Published by Shodensha in 4 vol.	
Salon (サロン)	1991–1992	Serialized in Young Rose; Published by Shufu to Seikatsusha in 1 vol.	
Sekai no Owari niwa Kimi to Issho ni (世界の終わりには君と一緒に)	1992	Published by Shufu to Seikatsusha in 2 vol.	
Cool	1992–1993	Serialized in Young You; Published by Shueisha in 1 vol.	
The Rules of Love (恋の掟, Koi no Okite)	1993–1994	Serialized in Feel Young; Published by Shodensha in 1 vol. Published in English by Tokyopop	
Nothing But Loving You (愛しあう事しかできない, Ai Shiau Koto shika Dekinai)	1994	Serialized in Feel Young; Published by Shodensha in 1 vol. Published in English by Tokyopop	
Escape (エスケープ)	1995	Serialized in Feel Young; Published by Shodensha in 1 vol.	
Between the Sheets (シーツの隙間, Shītsu no Sukuma)	1995–1996	Serialized in Feel Young; Published by Shodensha in 1 vol. Published in English by Tokyopop	
Love Vibes	1996	Serialized in Young You; Published by Shueisha in 1 vol.	
Diamonds (掌にダイヤモンド, Tenohira ni Daiyamondo)	1996–1997	Serialized in Feel Young; Published by Shodensha in 1 vol.	
Angel Breath (エンジェル・ブレス)	1997	Short story collection published by Shodensha in 1 vol.	
Romance no Oizumi (ロマンスの泉)	1997–1998	Serialized in Feel Young; Published by Shodensha in 1 vol.	
Angel (天使, Tenshi)	1999–2006	Serialized in Feel Young; Published by Shodensha in 2 vol. Vol. 1 published in English by Tokyopop	
Crash	1998–1999	Serialized in Feel Young; Published by Shodensha in 2 vol.	
Lovely! (ラブリー!, Raburī!)	1998–2009	Serialized in CUTiE Comic, Zipper Comic and FC Web; Published by Takarajimasha and Shodensha in 4 vol.	
Keseran Pasaran (ケセランパサラン)	1999	Serialized in Young You; Published by Shueisha in 1 vol.	
Angel Nest (天使の巣, Tenshi no Su)	2001	Short story collection published by Shodensha in 1 vol. Published in English by Tokyopop	
The Aromatic Bitters (アロマチック・ビターズ, Aromatikku Bitāzu)	2002–2003	Serialized in Feel Young; Published by Shodensha in 2 vol. Published in English by Tokyopop	
Kyō mo Otenki (今日もお天気)	2002–2012	Serialized in Feel Young; Published by Shodensha in 8 vol.	
Yume no Katachi (夢のかたち)	2001–2002	Serialized in Young You; Published by Shueisha in 1 vol.	
Body & Soul (ボディ&ソウル, Bodi & Souru)	2003–2004	Written by Takumi Terakado; Serialized in Feel Young; Published by Shodensha in 2 vol.	
Kashikoi Watashi no Gaika Tōshi (かしこい私の外貨投資)	2005	Published by Shogakukan in 1 vol.	
Angel Town (天使の棲む街, Tenshi no Sumu Machi)	2005	Published by Shodensha in 1 vol.	
Ai no Naseruwaza (愛のなせるわざ)	2006	Published by Shueisha in 1 vol.	
Erika Satire (エリカスタイル)	2006	Published by Shodensha in 1 vol.	
Hoshino Tanisō e yōkoso (星乃谷荘へようこそ)	2006–2007	Serialized in Chorus; Published by Shueisha in 1 vol.	
Tasogare no Nikita-chan - Sweet & Bitter Days of Adejo (黄昏のニキータちゃん)	2007	Published by Shufu to Seikatsusha in 1 vol.	
Kamino Kyōsuke no Kareina Nichijō (神野恭介の華麗な日常)	2008	Published by Fusōsha in 1 vol.	
Onna wo Migaku Otona no Ren'ai (女を磨く大人の恋愛ゼミナール)	2009	Published by Shueisha in 1 vol.	
Pool (プール)	2009	Published by Gentosha in 1 vol.	
Ai no Seikatsu (愛の生活)	2009	Published by Sobisha in 1 vol.	
Koi no Kaori (恋の香り)	2009–2010	Serialized in Office You; Published by Shueisha in 2 vol.	
Hakone Ekiden ni Koiwoshiyō Hashire! Miruko (箱根駅伝に恋をしよう走れ！ミル子)	2010	Published by Magazine House in 1 vol.	
Tasogare no Nikita-chan (黄昏のニキータちゃん2010)	2010	Published by Wani Plus in 1 vol.	
Tōkyō Torantan (東京トランタン)	2010	Published by Shodensha in 1 vol.	
Doctor Jitsu Kari no Nayamashiki Hibi (ドクター実狩の悩ましき日々)	2010	Published by Shueisha in 1 vol.	
Kimi no Iru Basho (君のいる場所)	2010–2011	Serialized in Feel Young; Published by Shodensha in 1 vol.	
Yume no Shizuku (夢の雫)	2012	Published by Shueisha in 1 vol.	
my dear life: Subarashiki Kanajo Jinsei (my dear life 素晴らしきかな女人生)	2012–2015	Serialized in Feel Young; Published by Shodensha in 1 vol.	
Love or Work?	2013	Short story collection published by Takarajimasha in 1 vol. Celebrating the 30th anniversary since her debut as a manga artist	
School Days	2013	Published by Shodensha in 1 vol.	
Eden (エデン)	2014	Published by Shueisha in 1 vol.	
Terrific! (テリフィック!)	2014–2016	Serialized in Office You; Published by Shueisha in 1 vol.	
Ballet Russes Nijinsky and Diaghilev (バレエ・リュス ニジンスキーとディアギレフ)	2014–2017	Written by Shinsu Ichikawa; Serialized in Feel Young; Published by Shodensha in 1 vol.	
Mofutsu to Sasaete (もふっ・とさせて)	2016–2018	Published by Shueisha in 2 vol.	
Komadori no Uta Beauty Legend Shidai-ki (こまどりの詩 ビューティーレジェンド四代記)	2021	Published by Shufu to Seikatsusha in 1 vol.	
Koi wa Okane ja Kaemasen (恋はお金じゃ買えません)	2021–Present	Serialized in Office You; Published by Shueisha in 4 vol. (as of February 2023)	
