= Dolis =

Japanese manga by Maki Kusumoto

Dolis (致死量ドーリス, Chitsuryō Dōrisu) is a josei manga by Maki Kusumoto. Published in Japan by Shodensha and licensed in English by Tokyopop.

== Characters ==
- Mitsu – Deeply disturbed female protagonist with an interest in art.
- Kishi – Love–struck male protagonist working as a bookstore clerk.

== Reception ==
Dominic Nguyen of Newtype USA and Carlo Santos of Anime News Network have noted the artwork in this romantic tragedy.
