= Milk Morizono =

Japanese manga artist and photographer

Milk Morizono 森園 みるく
- Born: Hiroko Mizoguchi; December 25, 1957 (age 68) Tokuyama, Yamaguchi, Japan
- Areas: Manga artist, photographer
- Notable works: Crazy Love Hisshouho; Peacemaker
- Spouses: Unnamed husband (m. 1977; div. 1981) Hyakurō Murasaki (died 2010)

Milk Morizono (Japanese: 森園 みるく, Hepburn: Morizono Miruku; born December 25, 1957) is the pen name of Hiroko Mizoguchi (Japanese: 溝口 比呂子, Hepburn: Mizoguchi Hiroko), a Japanese manga artist and photographer. Noted for her works in the ladies' manga genre that feature ecchi themes and subject material, Morizono has been called the "Queen of Ladies' Manga" and noted by Rachel Matt Thorn as "the most popular and respected creator of erotic manga for women".

== Biography ==
Morizono was born Hiroko Mizoguchi on December 25, 1957, in Tokuyama (now Shūnan), Yamaguchi Prefecture, where she drew manga as a child. In 1977, she married and began work as an office lady, but departed the job after a year. In 1981, she divorced her husband and made her professional debut as a manga artist with Crazy Love Hisshouhou published in the manga magazine Shōjo Comic. She won a Shogakukan Manga Award for new artists that same year.

From 1981 to 1986, Morizono primarily created shōjo manga (girls' comics) and gag cartoons for seinen manga (young men's comics) magazines. As ladies' manga began to incorporate more mature elements such as erotica and S&M in the late 1980s and early 1990s, Morizono began to create manga for the genre exclusively. During this period, she began publishing under the name "Milk" as a pen name that was "catchy and feminine". Between 1986 and 1995, Morizono published over 35 paperbacks and earned the nickname of "the Queen of Ladies' Manga".

In 1991, Morizono published the erotic manga series Peacemaker in Midori, a shōjo manga magazine published by Kodansha. The series received complaints from the police, parent–teacher associations, housewife groups, and politicians, and prompted Kodansha to pressure the editors of Midori to cease publishing works deemed "harmful". Kodansha refused to publish tankōbon volumes of Morizono's manga unless Peacemaker was revised, which Morizono refused; ultimately, neither Morizono nor Kodansha earned royalties from Peacemaker, and the series was not renewed despite its popularity. As a result, Morizono began primarily publishing works through Shodensha, a smaller company that published a tankōbon of Peacemaker in its uncensored form.

Morizono was married to manga artist Hyakurō Murasaki until his murder in 2010. She published an autobiographical manga on Murasaki's death, My Husband Was Suddenly Killed One Day (私の夫はある日突然殺された), in the digital manga magazine Mecha Comic in 2017. In addition to her manga work, Morizono also works as a photographer.

== Style ==
Morizono is known for her "glamorous and media-friendly" public persona and describes her art as etchi, a term broadly used to describe works that are erotic but not explicitly pornographic. Though sex figures heavily into her manga, her works do not render genitalia or pubic hair, and typically feature significant plot and character development in addition to sex scenes. Recurring elements in her work include "wealthy, jet-set young women" who find themselves in a variety of sexual scenarios, foreign settings, and gay characters. Unlike many manga artists who both write and illustrate their manga, Morizono frequently does not write her material, opting to instead work with new and unestablished writers with whom she shares 30 percent of the series' royalties.

== Works ==
The following works have been published by Morizono:

Year	Title	Publisher (Note: Manga magazine noted in parentheses where relevant.)
1981	Crazy Love Hisshouhou	Shogakukan (Shōjo Comic)
1983	Katte ni Senka (勝手に専科)	Shogakukan (Betsucomi)
1984	Kon'ya mo Sexual (今夜もセクシャル)	Shogakukan
1984	Nanika ii Koto shinai? Koneko-chan (なにかいいことしない？仔猫ちゃん)	Shogakukan
1988	Abunai Koibitotachi (あぶない恋人たち)	Tairiku Shobou
1989	Desire (デザイアー)	Shodensha (Feel Young)
1989	Feel So Bad	Futabasha
1989	Milky Pink (ミルキィピンク)	Tairiku Shobou
1989	All Night Long (オ－ルナイトロング)	Tairiku Shobou
1989	Cocktail Stories (カクテル・ストーリーズ)	Shodensha (Feel Young)
1989	Milky Pop (ミルキィポップ)	Tairiku Shobou
1989	Milky Panic (ミルキィパニック)	Tairiku Shobou
1989	Milky Party (ミルキィパ－ティ－)	Tairiku Shobou
1989	Milky Passion (ミルキーパッショーン)	Tairiku Shobou
1989	Slave to Love (スレーブ・トゥ・ラブ)	Shodensha (Feel Young)
1990	Déjà-vu	Shodensha (Feel Young)
1990	New York Stories	Shodensha (Feel Young)
1990	Venus Party	Shodensha (Feel Young)
1990	Hong Kong Yuugi (香港遊戯)	Shodensha (Feel Young)
1991	Sabu & June (さぶとJUNE)	Futabasha
1991	Crystal Rose (クリスタル・ローズ)	Shodensha
1991	Kagami no Tasogare (神々の黄昏)	Shodensha (Feel Young)
1991	Lust	Shodensha (Feel Young)
1991	Peacemaker	Kodansha (Midori)
1992	Hana Kagami (華鏡)	Shodensha (Feel Young)
1992	High Life (ハイ・ライフ)	Shodensha (Feel Young)
1992	Himiko (ヒミコ)	Shodensha (Feel Young)
1992	Kiara (キアラ)	Shodensha (Feel Young)
1993	Bondage Fantasy (ボンデージ・ファンタジー, Koufuku o Uru Otoko)	Shodensha (Feel Young)
1993	Daisy Blues (デイジー・ブルー)	Shodensha (Feel Young)
1993	Partner	Shodensha
1994	Soshite Tsutaete, Hibi no Owari ni (そして伝えて、日々の終わりに)	Shodensha (Feel Young)
1994	Atlas no Kaze (アトラスの風)	Shodensha (Feel Young)
1994	Junkyousha (殉教者)	Shodensha (Feel Young)
1994	Let's Go to Bed	Shodensha
1994	Midsummer Night (ミッドサマ－・ナイト)	Shodensha
1994	Seaside Lovers (シーサイド・ラバーズ)	Shodensha (Feel Young)
1995	Lion no Nakaniwa (ライオンの中庭)	Futabasha (Jour: Suteki na Shufu-tachi)
1995	Vegetable Love (ベジタブル・ラブ)	Shodensha (Feel Young)
1995	Lonely Hearts Club (ロンリ－・ハ－ツ・クラブ)	Shodensha (Feel Young)
1995	Velvet (ヴェルヴェット)	Shodensha (Feel Young)
1995	Anata no Kiss ga Ichiban Ii (あなたのKISSが一番いい)	Shodensha (Feel Young)
1995	Violetta (ヴィオレッタ)	Shodensha
1995	Ecstasy (エクスタシー)	Shodensha (Feel Young)
1995	Sweet Heart (スイート・ハート)	Shodensha (Feel Young)
1995	Pink Connection (ＰＩＮＫコネクション)	Shodensha (Feel Young)
1996	Pressure Game (プレッシャーゲーム)	Scholar
1996	Body Shooting	Scholar
1996	An Angel's Temptation (天使の誘惑)	Scholar
1996	Monroe Densetsu (モンロー伝説)	Shodensha (Feel Young)
1997	Drag	Shodensha (Feel Young)
1998	Platinum Finger (プラチナ・フィンガー)	Shodensha (Feel Young)
1998	Saturn Return (悪魔の帰還―サターン・リターン)	Ohta Publishing
1999	Melencolia (メランコリア)	SoftBank Creative
2001	Cleopatra Koori no Bishou (まんがグリム童話 クレオパトラ氷の女豹)	Bunkasha
2002	Atrocious Fairy Tales for Adults (シンデレラ 世界一美しい残酷童話)	Futabasha
2006	Ayashii Uzu (妖しい渦)	Futabasha
2007	Thérèse (欲望の聖女 令嬢テレジア)	Shogakukan (Josei Seven)
2008	Avalon Babies (アヴァロン・ベイビーズ)	Bunkasha (Hontou ni Kowai Douwa)
2016	Chimamire no Goo Punch - Bouryoku wo Yamerarenai Onna (血まみれのグーパンチ〜暴力をやめられない女〜)	Shogakukan
2017	Shin gokutsuma kaachan dotabata nikki ♪ (新・極妻母ちゃんドタバタ日記♪)	Bunkasha
2017	Manga Grimm Douwa - Satsujin Baishunpu (まんがグリム童話 殺人売春婦)	Bunkasha
2017	Manga Grimm Douwa - Dorei Bokujou (まんがグリム童話 奴隷牧場)	Bunkasha
2017	My Husband Was Suddenly Killed One Day (私の夫はある日突然殺された)	Mecha Comics

== Bibliography ==
- Kinsella, Sharon (2010). Adult Manga : Culture and Power in Contemporary Japanese Society. University of Hawaii Press. pp. 150–151. ISBN 978-0824823184.
- Schodt, Frederik L. (1996). Dreamland Japan: Writings on Modern Manga. Stone Bridge Press. pp. 207–212. ISBN 978-1933330952.
