= Josei manga =

Manga aimed at adult women

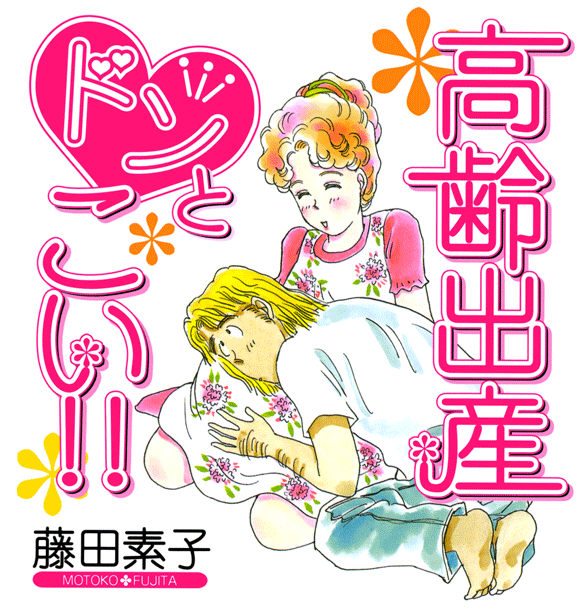
Cover illustration to the josei manga series Kōrei Shussan Don to Koi!! (Note: lit. 'Bring On the Late-Life Childbirth!!') by Motoko Fujita, an autobiography chronicling the author's pregnancy at the age of 43

Josei manga (女性漫画; lit. "women's comics", pronounced [dʑoseː]), also known as ladies' comics (レディースコミック) and its abbreviation redikomi (レディコミ; "lady-comi"), is an editorial category of Japanese comics that emerged in the 1980s. In a strict sense, josei refers to manga marketed to an audience of adult women, contrasting shōjo manga, which is marketed to an audience of girls and young adult women. (Note: The male equivalent of this division is seinen manga (marketed to adult and young adult men) and shōnen manga (marketed to teenage boys).) In practice, the distinction between shōjo and josei is often tenuous; while the two were initially divergent categories, many manga works exhibit narrative and stylistic traits associated with both shōjo and josei manga. This distinction is further complicated by a third manga editorial category, young ladies (ヤングレディース), which emerged in the late 1980s as an intermediate category between shōjo and josei.

Josei manga is traditionally printed in dedicated manga magazines which often specialize in a specific subgenre, typically drama, romance, or pornography. While josei dramas are, in most cases, realist stories about the lives of ordinary women, romance josei manga are typically soap opera–influenced melodramas, while pornographic josei manga shares many common traits with pornographic manga for a heterosexual male audience. The emergence of manga for an adult female audience as a category in the 1980s was preceded by the rise of gekiga in the 1950s and 1960s, which sought to use manga to tell serious and grounded stories aimed at adult audiences, and by the development of more narratively complex shōjo manga by artists associated with the Year 24 Group in the 1970s. The category became stigmatized in the late 1980s as it came to be associated with pornographic manga, though it gained greater artistic legitimacy in the 1990s as it shifted to social issue-focused stories. Josei manga has been regularly adapted into anime since the 2000s.

== Terminology ==
Several terms exist to describe manga aimed at an audience of adult women:

Ladies' comics (レディースコミック)
The first term used to describe this category of manga. It is a wasei-eigo construction where "ladies" is understood as a synonym for "women", thus indicating the adult-focused audience. The term developed a negative connotation in the 1990s as it came to be associated with low-quality and pornographic manga, though this connotation waned by the 2000s. An abbreviation of ladies' comics is redikomi (レディコミ; "lady-comi"), and in Japan, this abbreviation is the most commonly-used term for this category of manga.

Young ladies (ヤングレディース)
A wasei-eigo term denoting an intermediate category positioned between manga for adult women and shōjo manga.

Josei manga (女性漫画)
A term originated by critics and academics in the late 1990s to distinguish all manga aimed at adult women from shōjo manga. While not commonly used among general Japanese audiences, it is the term most commonly used by Western audiences to describe this category of manga.

== History ==
While manga aimed at a female audience has an extensive history that is expressed through the development of shōjo manga, for much of its history shōjo manga was targeted exclusively at an audience of children and young girls. This status quo began to shift in the late 1950s with the emergence of the concept of gekiga, which sought to use manga to tell serious and grounded stories aimed at adult audiences. By the late 1960s, gekiga was a mainstream artistic movement, and in 1968, the women's magazine Josei Seven published the first gekiga manga aimed at a female audience: Mashūko Banka (摩周湖晩夏) by Miyako Maki. Maki was a shōjo manga artist who debuted in the late 1950s and pivoted to gekiga as her original audience aged into adulthood. Two magazines dedicated to women's gekiga were founded shortly thereafter: Funny (ファニー, Fanī) by Mushi Production in 1969, and Papillon (パピヨン, Papiyon) by Futabasha in 1972, though neither were commercially successful and both folded after several issues.

Despite the commercial failure of women's gekiga, the 1970s nonetheless saw the significant development of shōjo manga through the efforts of artists in the Year 24 Group. The Year 24 Group contributed significantly to the development of shōjo manga by creating manga stories that were more psychologically complex, and which dealt directly with topics of politics and sexuality. Junya Yamamoto, who as editor of Shōjo Comic published multiple works by the Year 24 Group, became the founding editor of the magazine Petit Flower in 1980, which targeted an older teen readership and published adult-focused works by Year 24 Group members Moto Hagio and Keiko Takemiya. Consequently, the readership of shōjo manga widened from its historical audience of children to incorporate teenagers and young adult women. Publishers sought to exploit this new market of mature shōjo readers by creating dedicated magazines, which came to be described using the genre name "ladies' comics". Notable magazines include Be Love by Kodansha and You by Shueisha in 1980, and Big Comic for Lady by Shogakukan in 1981; all three magazines shared the common traits of originating as special issues of shōjo manga magazines that were spun off into regular publications, and an editorial focus on romance stories that emphasized sex.

Open depictions of sexual acts came to be a defining trait of ladies' comics, in contrast to the editorial restrictions still placed on sexual depictions in shōjo manga. The manga artist Milk Morizono, renowned for her "porn-chic" stories, emerged as one of the most popular ladies' comics authors of the 1980s. Ladies' comics magazines proliferated rapidly in the latter half of the decade, from eight magazines in 1984, to 19 in 1985, to 48 in 1991. By the 1990s, large commercially published ladies' comics magazines declined as a result of the Lost Decade and corresponding economic crisis, leading to the proliferation of smaller magazines focused on erotic and pornographic content. Consequently, ladies' comics developed a reputation as being "female pornography".

Contemporaneously, new manga magazines aimed at adult women in their early twenties emerged: Young You in 1987, Young Rose in 1990, and Feel Young in 1991. Manga published in these magazines came to be referred to as "young ladies" manga, originating from the word "young" appearing in the title of all three magazines, and was positioned in the manga market as an intermediate category between shōjo and ladies comics. Young ladies manga grew in popularity as shōjo artists who wished to create manga for an older audience while avoiding the stigma associated with ladies' comics migrated to the category. Teens' love also emerged as a subgenre of manga marketed towards women, which utilized the sex-focused narrative structure of ladies' comics, but with teenaged instead of adult protagonists. Ladies' comic magazines responded to this new competition by focusing on manga addressing social issues. The strategy was successful, and by the late 1990s had gained greater legitimacy as a literary genre and attracted a more general audience, with multiple ladies' comics titles adapted as films and television series. The term josei manga also emerged during this period, used primarily by academics to distinguish manga aimed at adult women from shōjo manga.

Josei as a category is generally less popular than shōjo, seinen, and shōnen manga. In 2010, You was the top-selling josei manga magazine, with a reported circulation of 162,917; by comparison, the top-selling shōjo magazine that year (Ciao) had a reported circulation of 745,455, while the top-selling seinen and shōnen magazines (Weekly Young Jump and Weekly Shōnen Jump) had reported circulations of 768,980 and 2.8 million, respectively. Anime has been a significant influencing factor in attracting a mainstream audience to josei manga since the 2000s, with the josei series Paradise Kiss (1999), Bunny Drop (2005), Chihayafuru (2007), Princess Jellyfish (2008), and Eden of the East (2009) all either originating as popular anime, or enjoying breakout success after being adapted into anime.

== Themes and subgenres ==
There are three primary subgenres in josei manga: drama, romance, and pornography. In 2002, drama and romance titles collectively represented roughly 80 percent of sales in the josei collected volume market, while pornography composed the remaining 20 percent. Drama and romance titles are typically released by large Japanese publishing companies, while pornography is typically published by smaller publishing houses.

=== Drama ===
Many josei dramas are realist stories about the lives of ordinary women. These stories are typically focused on a working woman in a given profession, most commonly a housewife, office lady, or pink-collar worker. Narratives typically focus on common personal issues such as dating, childcare, eldercare, beauty standards, workplace issues, marital strife, or adultery. Many also address social issues, such as aging and dementia, prostitution, or violence against women. Josei manga does also feature male protagonists, typically bishōnen (literally "beautiful boys", roughly analogous to the Western "pretty boy") who often appear in stories with homoerotic subtext.

Stories are sometimes based on the experiences of readers themselves, who are actively invited to submit stories based on their own life experiences, and receive payment if their submissions are chosen to be adapted into manga. Josei manga magazines often publish special issues dedicated to a specific topic, such as issues devoted to divorce, illnesses, and cosmetic surgery. These topic-based issues occasionally include non-manga columns that provide information about the subjects covered in the issue. Sociologist Kinko Itō considers that josei dramas serve as a form of catharsis for the reader by depicting a character who is enduring greater hardship than they are, while manga scholar Fusami Ogi considers josei dramas as presenting role models and potential ways of life for female readers.

=== Romance ===
Josei romances typically eschew the realism of josei dramas, instead more closely resembling the heightened melodrama of a soap opera or a Harlequin romance novel. (Note: The publishing house Ohzora Publishing publishes Harlequin novels adapted as josei manga.) Stories often adhere to common romance novel story formulas, such as a woman who encounters a Prince Charming-like man with whom she embarks on a variety of adventures and ultimately marries. Consequently, josei romances are often criticized for reflecting and perpetuating stereotypes of women as emotionally dependent or submissive in relationships, or for romanticizing and normalizing unhealthy relationship dynamics.

Sexual encounters between the protagonist and their partner are commonplace, while romantic fantasy themes often manifest in the setting (frequently either foreign or historical) or through heroic protagonists (princes and princesses, ghosts, people who possess supernatural abilities, etc.). Variant sexual identities, such as gay and transgender characters, also appear in these narratives. Josei romances target both a younger and older readership, with many stories aimed at teenaged girls, as evidenced by the extensive use of furigana as a reading aid.

=== Pornography ===
Pornographic josei manga shares many common traits with pornographic manga for a heterosexual male audience, though stories are typically written from a female rather than male point of view. Traits common to heterosexual pornography, such as female domination and objectification, similarly recur in pornographic josei manga; a common story formula in josei pornography is one in which a shy and intelligent woman is transformed into a nymphomaniac or a sex slave. Lesbian relationships also appear in pornographic josei manga, suggesting a lesbian readership of josei manga. Manga scholar Deborah Shamoon considers that the appeal of pornographic josei for a female audience lies in the ability of drawn pornography to depict subjects that are not easily depicted in filmed pornography, such as the female orgasm.

== Comparison to other manga categories ==
=== Shōjo manga ===
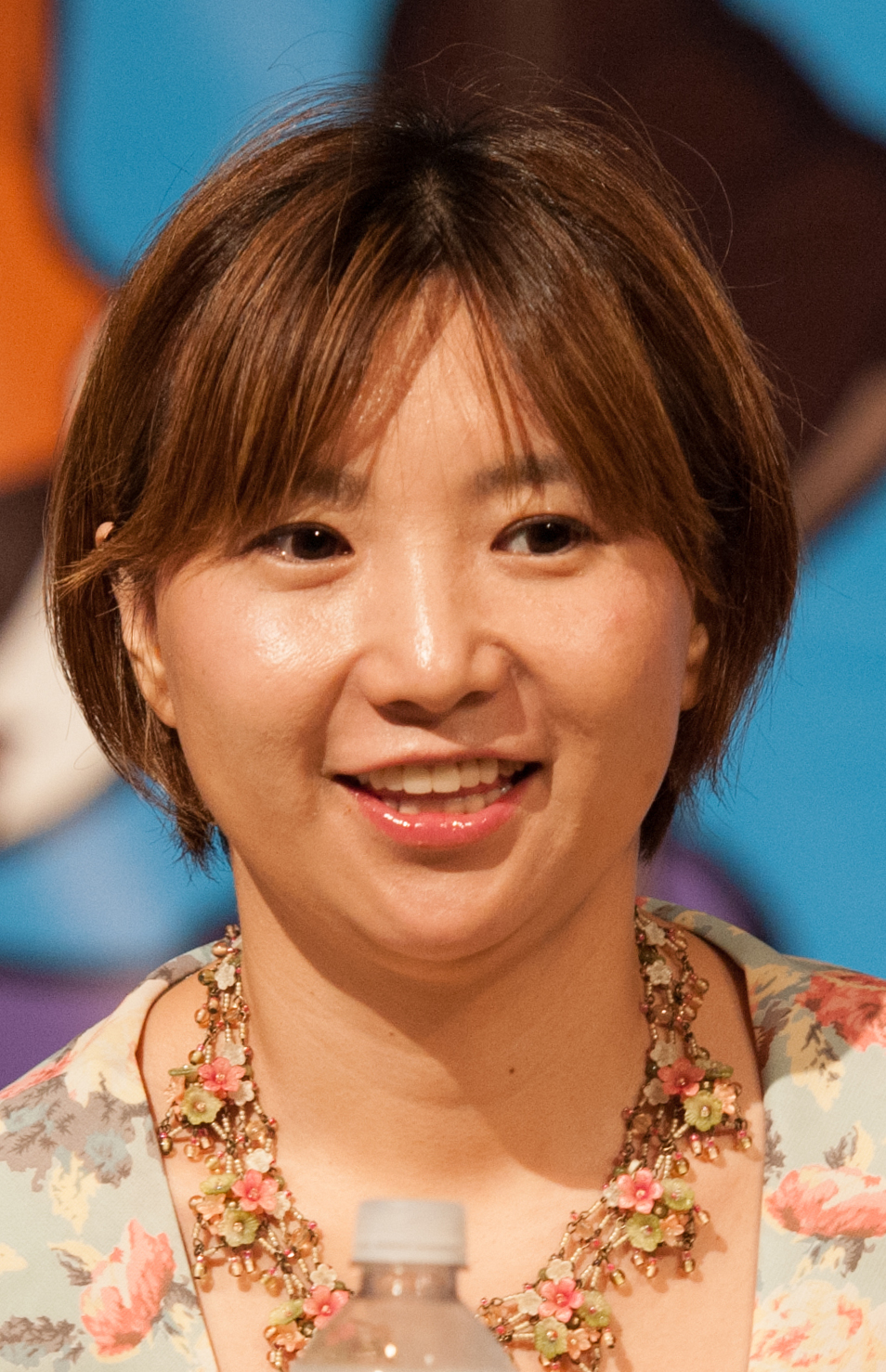
Mayu Shinjo, one of several artists who has authored both josei and shōjo manga

When josei manga initially emerged in the 1980s, it differentiated itself from shōjo manga by exploring adult topics such as work, sex, and life after marriage, and was directed at a readership of women who were "no longer a shōjo". Manga scholar Yukari Fujimoto notes this focus on realism as a primary distinguishing mark of josei stories, compared to the more fantastical narratives common in shōjo manga. This manifests in the careers commonly held by protagonists in each respective category: actresses, models, and musicians in shōjo manga, compared to ordinary working women in josei manga. Fujimoto further considers depictions of marriage as a primary dividing line between the categories, with shōjo depicting life before marriage, and josei depicting life afterwards.

Since the emergence of young ladies manga, distinctions between the categories have been increasingly blurred. In narratives, protagonists of all ages can readily be found in both shōjo and josei manga, with shōjo stories featuring adult protagonists and josei stories focusing on teens and younger characters. Stories that depict sex have been published in shōjo manga magazines such as Sho-Comi, while sex is virtually non-existent in some josei magazines such as Monthly Flowers.

At the editorial level, there is no consistent standard for segmenting manga aimed at a female audience, with terminology and categories varying across decades, publishing houses, and magazines. Since the 2000s, some large publishers such as Shueisha and Kodansha have grouped all manga magazines aimed at a female audience under a single category. Formatting of tankōbon bound volumes, where larger and more expensive books are traditionally reserved for titles aimed at an adult audience, similarly follow no formal rules, with adult manga sold in small and inexpensive formats and youth manga sold in large formats.

It is common for authors to create shōjo and josei manga simultaneously, with Mari Ozaki, George Asakura, and Mayu Shinjo among the numerous artists who produce works across categories. This dynamic contrasts shōnen and seinen manga, where artists generally produce works in one category exclusively, and artists that do switch categories rarely switch back.

=== Shōnen and seinen manga ===
There have been several examples of josei works that share common traits with shōnen and seinen manga, or that blur distinctions between the categories. Saiyuki by Kazuya Minekura was serialized in the shōnen magazine Monthly GFantasy, though its sequel Saiyuki Reload was published in the josei magazine Monthly Comic Zero Sum. Fujio Akatsuka's 1962 manga series Osomatsu-kun was originally serialized in Weekly Shōnen Sunday, though when the series was rebooted in 2015 as the anime series Mr. Osomatsu, its manga spin-off was published in the josei magazines You and Cookie. Anthony Gramuglia of Comic Book Resources identifies the anime series Lupin the Third: The Woman Called Fujiko Mine, part of the Lupin the Third media franchise, as a notable josei adaptation of a seinen manga.

== See also ==
- Joseimuke
- Portrayal of women in American comics
