= Shodensha =

Japanese publisher

Shodensha Publishing Co., Ltd.
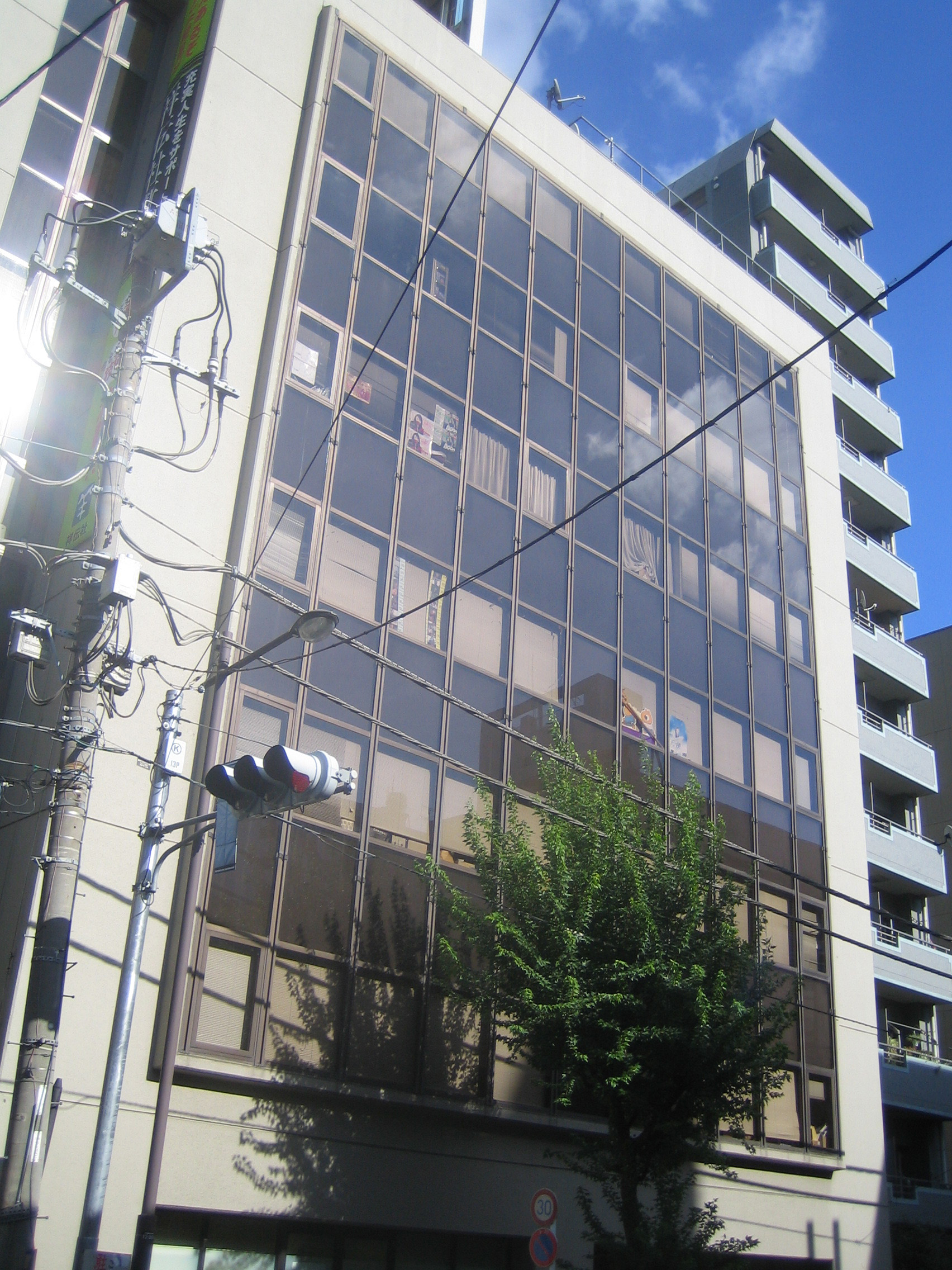
- Native name: 株式会社祥伝社
- Romanized name: Kabushiki kaisha Shōdensha
- Type: Private
- Founded: November 1970; 55 years ago
- Headquarters: Jinbōchō, Chiyoda, Tokyo, Japan
- Key people: Kazuyoshi Takeuchi (president)
- Products: Non-fiction, magazines, manga, fashion books and magazines, lifestyle
- Parent: Hitotsubashi Group
- Website: www.shodensha.co.jp

Shodensha (Japanese: 株式会社祥伝社, Hepburn: Kabushiki kaisha Shōdensha) is a Japanese publisher of mostly non-fiction magazines and books, though it has recently begun publishing light novels and manga, including magazines which contain both. Shodensha publishes magazines such as Feel Young (a josei all-manga magazine), Zipper (a fashion magazine aimed at high school and college girls and women, known for including manga), and Nina's (a fashion and lifestyle magazine aimed at younger housewives).

Shodensha is a member of the keiretsu Hitotsubashi Group of publishing companies.

== History ==
Shodensha was founded on November 5, 1970, by five people: Shōzō Sasabe (from Shogakukan), Isamu Kurosaki (from Kobunsha), Kōzaburō Iga, Hidenori Sakurai, and Toshio Fujioka.

The company was able to release a number of best selling titles which helped the company get off to a running start. They began their "Non-Novel" imprint in 1973, and their "Non-Pochette" imprint in 1975. In 2000, Shodensha created their Shodensha Gold imprint, and their most recent imprint, Shodensha Shinsho, was released in 2005.

Shodensha has also published a variety of magazines throughout the years, including Bishō (微笑) (a magazine which covers a wide range of women's issues, first published in 1996), Boon (a young street fashion magazine published from 1986 to 2008), Karada ni Ii Koto (からだにいいこと) (began publication in 2004), as well as the previously mentioned Feel Young, Zipper, and Nina's.

== Magazines ==
- Feel Young, josei manga magazine.
- Karada ni Ii Koto, a lifestyle and health magazine aimed at women in their 30s and older.
- Nina's, a women's lifestyle and fashion magazine.
- Shosetsu Non, a magazine which serializes light novels.
- Zipper, a young women's fashion magazine.
- Boon, young men's fashion magazine.
- Feel Love, josei romance novels magazine.
  - Coffret, web magazine where all Feel Love serializations were moved after August 2014
- On BLUE, a yaoi manga magazine
