= Comic Beam =

Japanese manga magazine

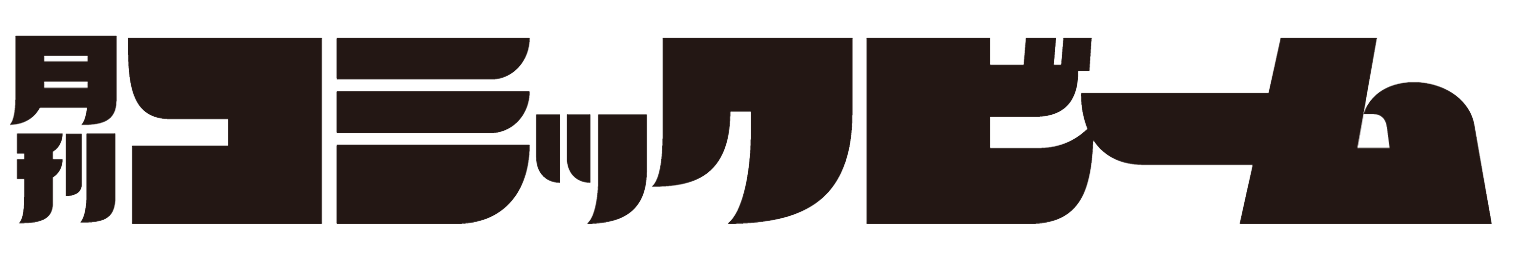

- Cover of the May 2006 issue, featuring Emma
- Editor-in-Chief: Wakana Nishiyama
- Categories: Seinen manga
- Frequency: Monthly
- Circulation: 25,000 (2010)
- First issue: November 11, 1995; 31 years ago
- Company: ASCII (1995–2000); Enterbrain (2000–2013); Kadokawa (2013–present)
- Country: Japan
- Based in: Tokyo
- Language: Japanese
- Website: comic-walker.com/label/comicbeam

Comic Beam (Japanese: コミックビーム, Hepburn: Komikku Bīmu) is a Japanese monthly manga magazine published by Kadokawa. It publishes seinen manga, though critics have described it as being distinct from other seinen manga magazines and described it as an alternative manga magazine instead. Titles published in the magazine include Desert Punk by Masatoshi Usune, Emma by Kaoru Mori, Wandering Son by Takako Shimura, and Thermae Romae by Mari Yamazaki.

The magazine was launched in November 1995 by ASCII as a successor to Famicomi and ASCII Comics. Enterbrain acquired the magazine in 2000, before they were merged with Kadokawa in 2013. The magazine has struggled with low sales throughout its history, though it has managed to cultivate a small audience of hardcore comics enthusiasts.

== History ==
Comic Beam was launched by ASCII as a successor to Famicomi and ASCII Comics. Initially, the magazine's focus was manga based on video games. Its first issue was released on November 11, 1995. The magazine was acquired by Enterbrain in 2000. In 2006, the magazine published a special issue, Comic Beam Fellows!, which was spun-off into the magazine Fellows! (now Harta) in October 2008.

In 2013, Enterbrain was merged into the Kadokawa Corporation. As part of the magazine's 30th anniversary in 2025, the magazine launched the Comic Beam Manga Award for new manga artists.

== Content ==
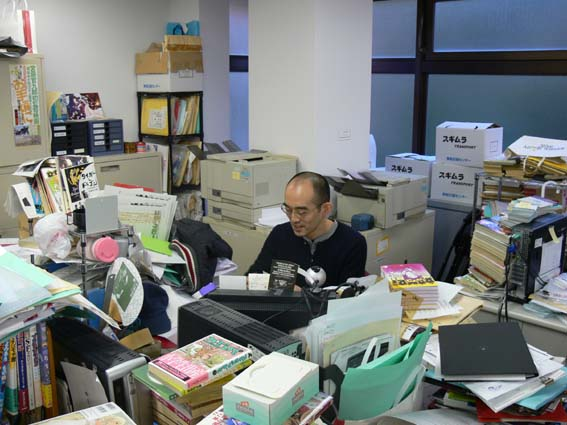
An editor at work in a Comic Beam office in November 2006

Comic Beam is considered to be a seinen manga magazine. However, critics have described it as distinct from other seinen manga magazines, with Shaenon K. Garrity describing the magazine as "alt-seinen" and Erica Friedman calling it part of a "fifth column" distinct from other manga demographics. It is also sometimes considered to be an alternative manga magazine.

Works published in Comic Beam tend to be more experimental in nature. Noriko Tetsuka, who was the editor-in-chief of AX, felt that, despite being owned by a major publisher, Comic Beam still published works shunned by other manga magazines. Jason Thompson wrote that the magazine publishes "an eclectic mix of material".

Comic Beam has been noted as one of the first manga magazines in Japan to publish works written by Korean authors. The magazine also published Wandering Son, a manga that features a transgender protagonist and discusses gender identity in Japan.

=== Beam Comix ===
The magazine's titles are published in tankōbon volume format under the Beam Comix (ビームコミックス, Bīmu Komikkusu; also spelled 'Beam Comics') imprint. Until September 2017, Beam Comix volumes were released on the 25th of each month, but since October 2017, they have been released on the 12th of every month instead, which corresponds with the magazine's release date. The Beam Comix imprint also publishes works that were not serialized in the magazine, such as Captivated, by You.

== Circulation ==
In 2009 and 2010, Comic Beam had a circulation of 25,000. The magazine has struggled throughout much of its history and has published manga making fun of its low sales. It has often resorted to "going-out-of-business scare tactics" and begging to keep its existing readers. In 2016, the magazine declared a "state of emergency" due to declining sales. A year later, an editor stated the magazine improved its financial situation by offering more of its titles through digital services and increasing their international distribution.

Despite the small readership, the magazine has managed to cultivate an audience of hardcore comics enthusiasts, with Friedman describing it as a "comic for comic freaks".

== Serializations ==
Title	Year	Author(s)	Notes	Ref.
Desert Punk	1997–2020	Masatoshi Usune		
Yajikita in Deep	1997–2002	Kotobuki Shiriagari		
Bambi and Her Pink Gun	1998–2002	Atsushi Kaneko		
Otakus in Love	1998–2001	Jun Hanyunyū		
Zombie Hunter	1998	Yang Kyung-il	Based on a novel by Kazumasa Hirai	
Ultra Heaven	2001–present	Keiichi Koike	On hiatus	
Emma	2002–2008	Kaoru Mori		
King of Thorn	2002–2005	Yūji Iwahara		
Wandering Son	2002–2013	Takako Shimura		
Little Fluffy Gigolo Pelu	2002–2004	Junko Mizuno		
Soil	2003–2010	Atsushi Kaneko		
Astral Project	2005–2007	Marginal; Syuji Takeya		
The Strange Tale of Panorama Island	2007–2008	Suehiro Maruo	Based on a novella by Edogawa Ranpo	
Thermae Romae	2008–2013	Mari Yamazaki		
Areyo Hoshikuzu	2013–2018	Sansuke Yamada		
The Colour Out of Space	2015	Gou Tanabe	Based on a short story by H. P. Lovecraft	
Cocoon Entwined	2018–2022	Yuriko Hara		
Mizuno and Chayama	2018–2019	Yuuta Nishio		
Little Miss P	2018–2020	Ken Koyama		
Baku-chan	2019–2020	Jūshichi Masumura		
Lost Lad London	2019–2021	Shima Shinya		
Fami-res Iko	2020	Yama Wayama		
Evol	2020–2025	Atsushi Kaneko		
Hereditary Triangle	2021–2022	Fumiya Hayashi		
Onna no Ko ga Iru Basho wa	2021–2022	Ebine Yamaji		
Stardust Family	2022–2023	Aki Poroyama		
Sukima	2023–2025	Yan Gao		
Kaijū o Kaibō Suru	2024–2025	Mado Saitō		

== Accolades ==
In the 2018 edition of Takarajimasha's Kono Manga ga Sugoi! guidebook's list of the top manga magazines, Comic Beam ranked thirteenth. It ranked eighth in the 2020 edition.
