= Nova Express (disambiguation) =

Nova Express is a 1964 novel by William S. Burroughs.

Nova Express may also refer to:

- Nova Express (album), a 2011 album by John Zorn
- Nova Express (fanzine), a 1987–2002 American science fiction fanzine
- Nova Express, a 1969–1970 Australian band featuring Linda George
- Nova Express, a fictional magazine, for which Douglas Roth is a reporter, in the 1986–1987 graphic novel Watchmen
- Nova Express, a fictional drug in the Japanese manga Ultra Heaven
- Nova Express Café, a defunct restaurant in Los Angeles, California, U.S.
