= Hina-chan no Nichijō =

Japanese manga series

ひなちゃんの日常 (Hina-chan no Nichijo)
- Genre: Slice of life story
- Manga
- Written by: Hiroko Minami
- Published by: Sankei Shimbun
- Original run: March 2005 – March 2009
- Volumes: 4

Hina-chan no Nichijō (ひなちゃんの日常; lit. "Hina's Daily Life") is a Japanese manga written and illustrated by Hiroko Minami. The Japan Cartoonist Association awarded Hina-chan no Nichijo its 2008 Grand Prize of the Japan Cartoonists Association Award along with Naoki Urasawa's 20th Century Boys.

== Manga ==
The manga was written and illustrated by Hiroko Minami. Sankei Shimbun published the manga's four bound volumes between March 2005 and March 2009.

=== Volume listing ===
No.	Release date	ISBN
1	March 2005	978-4-902-97001-2
2	May 31, 2008	978-4-819-11012-9
3	July 2008	978-4-819-11013-6
4	March 2009.	978-4-819-11040-2
