= Japan Cartoonists Association Award =

Annual award for manga

Japan Cartoonists Association Award 日本漫画家協会賞
- Awarded for: Manga
- Country: Japan
- First award: 1972
- Website: nihonmangakakyokai.or.jp/about/about07

The Japan Cartoonists Association Award (Japanese: 日本漫画家協会賞, Hepburn: Nihon Mangaka Kyōkai Shō) is an annual award for manga, sponsored by the Japan Cartoonists Association. The prize was first awarded in 1972.

== Prizes ==
Recipients of the Grand Prize receive a gold plaque, a medal, and a cash prize of ¥500,000. Recipients of the Excellence Prize receive a silver plaque, a medal, and a cash prize of ¥200,000. Recipients of the Special Award receive the same items as the winner(s) of the Grand Prize.

== Recipients ==
Year	Grand Prize	Excellence Award	Special Award	Minister of Education, Science and Technology Award	Effort Award
1972	Doubutsu Manga Hyakka, Yasuo Yoshitomi	n/a	n/a	n/a	Nippon Genjin Donaishōntoropusu, Hideo Kiso; Hito Kui Gyo, Yoshihiro Tatsumi
1973	Uchusen Noa, Kunio Hatakeda	Mimoza Yashiki de Tsukamaete, Yumiko Ōshima; Ichiren no Taburo Sakuhin, Kouji Nakajima; Sokkuri, Sunao Hari; Doraemon, Fujiko Fujio; Watashi no Yosei Tachi, Keiichiro Makino	n/a	n/a	n/a
1974	Genroku Yujoden, Toku Yano	Hibiscus Erotic, Ryū Kumita Manga no Obento Hako, Shinji Nagashima Senzo wo Tazunete Okuman nen, Akio Itō Ano Musume wa dare, Kazuko Makino Hisho no Onna, Miyako Maki	Aru Fuzoku Emaki, Kenro Endo		
1975	Hamahiru kao, Taku Kiriko	Sharibari Ten, Takeo Iwata Tsuruhime ja, Yoshiko Tsuchida	Black Jack, Osamu Tezuka		Nihon no Matsuri, Isao Hirano
1976	Matagi, Takao Yaguchi	Shuppatsu Shinko Suru, Shōji Izumi Irodori no koro, Mutsumi Tsukumo			
1977	Hoku ni Somou Hibi Areba, Teruo Yamamura	Chiisana Koi no Monogatari, Chikako Mitsuhashi	Notari Matsutarō, Tetsuya Chiba Ganbare Gonbe, Shunji Sonoyama		
1978	Dobutsu Shiriizu, Hisako Tamura	Den'en Misuterii, Mitsuru Shima Modotte Kuta Mushi tachi, Kōji Kondō	Leiji Matsumoto for his various science fiction works		
1979	Hyakubaka, Ryūchi Yokoyama	Shiki no jo iro Irogami, Takeshi Nakazawa Pikora-pikora, Haruko Tachiiri Yuka ina Futari, Aōni Yamane Hachi Purasu Mugen dai, Uno Kamakiri			
1980	n/a	Moon Nonsense, Minori Tanaka Kimama na ongakka tachi, Hiromi Ōnishi Personal exhibition by Reiko Okuda Orpheus no Mado, Riyoko Ikeda	Fumio Matsuyama's World, Fumio Matsuyama		
1981	n/a	Big Comic no Kyoshi, Shūichi Higurashi Mandara Oku no Ryōta, Jun Hatanaka INRI and Domu, Katsuhiro Otomo Maigo, Tokotaro Chiba Aquarium X, Kyohiko Morimoto			
1982	n/a	Zettai Anzen Kamisori, Fumiko Takano Emaki ehon Kawa, Kazuo Maekawa 1 koma 1/2 the Family of Manga, Kenji Morita Pari to Nekoto, Kōichi Namekawa Habu tori, Kenshin Shinzato	Manga Shounen shi, Hiro Terada		
1983	Kai de miro Nihon sutorippu shi, Sanichi Onozawa	1 Chōme no Tora Yoshi, Setsuko Yamada Antaga Nikui, Mikio Igarashi Fuke Batobuyona, Makoto Ayuzawa	Fushizu Manga kan, Shōryō Inomata		
1984	Yūmoa Kejime Shōkōgun, Kōichi Nishimura	Gassō, Hinako Sugiura Hayami Sora Manga Shū, Sora Hayami	Nihon Nonbiri Ryokō, Reiji Aki		
1985	Kaida Masano no āban sekai, by Masano Kaida	Girishia Shinwa, by Mariko Bamine Enbanusagi, Kishi Adachi	Omokage no Onna, Yukio Sugiura		
1986	Ichiro Ninja Kō, Ichirō Tominaga	Miharashiga oka Nite, Yōko Kondō Yūmoa Pasutā Shū, Takashi Akiyama Gyōza Tokuhon, Katsumi Yamasaki	Isao Shimizu, for his work on the research of modern manga		
1987	Uramachi Serenāde, Yū Takita	Dagashiya Furi Nigao Katarogu, Yoshihito Sekine Tori Shinwa, Hisanori Iwamoto St. 14 Graffiti, Taeko Watanabe	Ryōsuke Nasu for 50 years as a manga artist		
1988	Cartoon Guide to the Japanese Economy, Shotaro Ishinomori	Shokugo no Dokuyaku; Shokunin Momo Zukushi and other illustrated collections, by Hideo Takeda Manga 5-7-5, Okaoni Yamane	Fukushi Manga Minna ii hito, Aki Tatsuyama		
1989	n/a	Ago Bāchan, Toshiko Ueda Yake ato no Genki-kun, Kenichi Kitami Ichiren no Komikku Sakuhin, Eiko Hanamura Shōnen no hi, Yūji Andō	Zheng Xin Yao Manga Selection, by Zheng Xin Yao		
1990	Anpanman, Takashi Yanase	Okamehachimoku, Nanae Sasaya Hito komawārudo, Masashi Fukano Hat Cat But, Parco Maeda (マエダ パルコ) Namuji, Yoshikazu Yasuhiko	Osamu Tezuka (posthumously), for helping build modern manga		
1991	Cartoon Collection, Feconippon	Arukasaru - Ōjō, Yasuko Aoike Annyamonnya, Shinichirō Nozaki Sangokushi, Mitsuteru Yokoyama East Chou Dynasty Hero Legend, Chen Uen	Kabuki Bunraku ni Yosete, Sono Enoki	Sazae-san, Machiko Hasegawa	
1992	Gokuraku chō Itchōme, by Masahiro Nikaidō	Shin Naru Mono Dangai, Fumiko Sone Koko dake no Futari!!, Hiromi Morishita Boku to Furio to Kōtei de and I Kai Roku, Daijirō Morohoshi Seiji Manga, Shin Yamada	Boku no Hosomichi, Tsunepei Shimura	Ryūichi Yokoyama for contribution and achievement in manga culture	
1993	Yō, kai! Kai?, Masaru Morozumi	Office Chair Syndrome, Kazu Kuroiwa Ink, Yoshihisa Hashi Botchan no Jidai, Natsuo Sekikawa and Jiro Taniguchi From the End of Darkness, Mutsumi Tsukumo	Nansensu ni Kakeru, Masayuki Mineshima	Noboru Baba	
1994	Nausicaä of the Valley of the Wind, Hayao Miyazaki	Nansensu Supōtsu, Hiroshi Kasamatsu E Nimaruzu, Masaki Katori Hi no Ryōsen, Kayono Saeki	Qman, Commemoration of the 45th Anniversary of the Founding of the Kyushu Cartoonists Association, the Kyushu Cartoonists Association	Doraemon, Fujiko F. Fujio	
1995	Manga Sunday Concert Expand, Kazuo Ozawa	Round and Round Bye-bye Again, Chikai Tanaka Glass Mask, Suzue Miuchi House of Acorns, Osamu Yamamoto	Katsuichi Nagai, for publishing the monthly manga magazine Garo for over 30 years	Anpanman, Takashi Yanase	
1996	n/a	Highlights of Ikkyu, Hisashi Sakaguchi Cartoon Corner, Seigō Sakai Man is Manure, Woman is Splendid, Yoshimi Numajiri 366 Days of the 20th Century, Masaru Hashimoto Peppermint Monogatari, Masayuki Mori	Hako e, Yukio Izumi	Shigeru Mizuki for his yōkai manga	
1997	Atagoal Tamatebako, Hiroshi Masumura	AGON Recording Work and Social Conditions Manga, Hiroshi Kawarasaki Echigo House Gold Coin, Misako Nachi	Nonkina Heitai, Hisatoshi Aoki	Fujio Akatsuka	
1998	n/a	Weird woodblock-print man, Naoki Karasawa New Town Old Town Tokyo Sketch, Tarō Suzuki Songs of Hydrangea, Kurimaru Mori	Kinko's World, Kinko Ōyama	Shotaro Ishinomori	
1999	E de yomu Amidakyō, Miyotarō Sagawa	Kobo-chan and Otoboke Kachō, Masashi Ueda Patalliro!, Mineo Maya Oi wa Tanoshi! Rōjin Manga Sengen, Yūji Nishizawa	Meiku no Sekai o Egaku, Mangaka no Ehon no Kai Kuri-chan no Dōbutsuen Sanpo, Susumu Nemoto	Mappira-kun (Mr. No Way), Yoshirō Katō	
2000	n/a	Mr. Salary, Sō Nishimura Echigo Arakawadō Yama, Kazumichi Ishizaka The 'Henshin' Akiyoshi Sugimoto Manga Collection, Akiyoshi Sugimoto	Norakuro and other various works, Suihou Tagawa Bōken Dankichi, Keizō Shimada	Ko Kojima	
2001	Asatte-kun, Sadao Shōji KochiKame, Osamu Akimoto	n/a	GoGo Monster, Taiyō Matsumoto	Tetsuya Chiba	
2002	Golgo 13, Takao Saito Sanwari-kun, Yoshiji Suzuki	n/a	Tadao Kimura	Masako Watanabe	
2003	Tasogare Ryūseigun, Kenshi Hirokane Hisaichi Ishii	Cartoon 2003, Masafumi Kikuchi	Sono Gyōseki, Takeshi Morikuma	Toshiko Ueda	
2004	Hanobano-kun (Mr. Faintly), Kimihiko Tsukuda Say Hello to Black Jack, Shūhō Satō	n/a	Inner Lane, Hirokazu Suzuki	Mitsuteru Yokoyama	
2005	My August 15th, by the My August 15 Association Disappearance Diary, Hideo Azuma		Manga man reprint edition, Tokiwa Ōsaka Daiji Kazumine, for a half century in the drawing industry with one large peak in two complete works The Japanese Festival is Drawn Using Manga, Isao Hirano	Fujiko Fujio A.	
2008	20th Century Boys and 21st Century Boys, Naoki Urasawa; Hina-chan no Nichijō, Hiroko Minami	Alfheim no Kishi, Seika Nakayama	Nazo no Manga.k.a. Sakai Shichima Den, Haruyuki Nakano; Manpu Hashizume		
2009	Kamakura Monogatari, Ryohei Saigan; Seiji Manga, Yukiyoshi Tokoro	Children of the Sea, Daisuke Igarashi			
2010	Shinya Shokudō, Yarō Abe; Twilight Hospital, Makoto Ayusawa	Takumi Nagayasu			
2011	Help Man!, Riki Kusaka; Rakuga, Kamakiri Uno		Kōchi Prefecture	Moto Hagio	
2012	One Piece, Eiichiro Oda; Nekodarake Nice, Kimuchi Yokoyama		Kyoto International Manga Museum	Keiko Takemiya	
2013	Shizukanaru Don, Tatsuo Nitta		Kyou mo Ii Tenki, Osamu Yamamoto; Pendulum, Tekken	Hiroshi Hirata	
2014	Asari-chan, Mayumi Muroyama	Fuichin Tsaichen!, Motoka Murakami	Manmaru Danchi and Nonki Toori, Shige Oda	Kenji Morita	
2015	Kōri no Tenohira Siberia Yokuryūki, Yuki Ozawa Ichigo Sensō, Machiko Kyō	Hitokoma Biyori, Seiji Kinami	Makoto Wada	Chiisana Koi no Monogatari, Chikako Mitsuhashi	
2016	Hanagami Sharaku, Kei Ichinoseki Kariage-kun, Masashi Ueda	Daredo-nai tokoro kara no nagame, Mikio Igarashi	Mikiya Mochizuki	Ryūzan Aki	
2017	Tsuge yoshiharu: Yume to tabi no sekai, Yoshiharu Tsuge Crazy Manga, Yōji Kuri	Peleliu: Guernica of Paradise, Kazuyoshi Takeda	Sanpei Satō		
2018	Morohoshi Daijirō Gekijō, Daijiro Morohoshi Hitokomart, Yukio Shinohara	My Brother's Husband, Gengoroh Tagame	Nihon Manga-ten, Nihon Manga no Kai and Toshiko Nishida	Go Nagai	
2019	Areyo Hoshikuzu, Sansuke Yamada (Comic Division) Yokota Yoshiaki, Yoshiaki Yokota (Cartoon Division)	Yūgure e, Nazuna Saitō	Momoko Sakura	Baron Yoshimoto	
2020	Fuun Children, Taro Minamoto (Comic Division) Caricatures / political cartoons by Masaaki Sato (Cartoon Division)		Comic Market Preparatory Committee	Monkey Punch for Lupin the Third	
2021	Demon Slayer: Kimetsu no Yaiba, Koyoharu Gotouge (Comic Division) New Normal, Joruju Piroshiki (Cartoon Division)	War's Unwomanly Face, Keito Koume		Roly-poly Toy Project	
2022	Golden Kamuy, Satoru Noda (Comic Division); Teinei na Kurashi wo Suru Gaki, Koji Chiriakuta (Cartoon Division)	Takopi's Original Sin, Taizan 5 Wataru Sekai wa Omoshiroi, Seigō Sakai		Takao Saito and Saitō Production	
2023	Spy × Family, Tatsuya Endo (Comic Division); Fūshi Manga De Toku Onna Wo Matsu Barrier, Toshiko Nishida (Cartoon Division); Rondo: The Ladies' Graphic Magazine, Hiromi Matsuo (Manga Division)	Made in Abyss, Akihito Tsukushi; Vilange, Osamu Takeuchi		Locke the Superman, Yuki Hijiri	
2024	Calorie no Tsuyagoto, Yua Oda (Comic Division); Takupedia, Taku Furukawa (Cartoon Division); Chiikawa, Nagano (Manga Division)	Kyonen no Yuki, Eiichi Muraoka; Dragon and Chameleon, Ryō Ishiyama		Nagayasu Takumi Zensakuhin, Takumi Nagayasu	
2025	Cat Companions Maruru and Hachi, Yuri Sonoda (Comic Division); 10-nin no Hakase no Hiruyasumi, Masaru Yamaguchi (Cartoon Division); Star Tripper: Planetarium Ghost Travel, Sakana Sakatsuki (Manga Division)	Never Say Ugly, Arako Toaru; Kumauchi no Samurai, Kei Honjō		Kazuo Umezu	
2026	A Witch's Life in Mongol, Tomato Soup (Comic Division); WART CARTOON — 1-koma Manga kara Yomitoku Myanmar no Kurushimi to Negai, WART (Cartoon Division); Manga Ishibumi: Genbaku ga Ochite Kuru Toki, Bokura wa Sora wo Miteita, Machio Same (Manga Division)	The Kaiju Autopsy, Mado Saitō; Sukima, Yan Gao		Big Joe	

== See also ==
- List of manga awards
