= Baku-chan =

Japanese manga series

- First tankōbon volume cover

バクちゃん
- Genre: Science fiction; Slice of life
- Manga
- Written by: Jūshichi Masumura
- Published by: Enterbrain
- Imprint: Beam Comix
- Magazine: Comic Beam
- Original run: August 10, 2019 – December 11, 2020
- Volumes: 2

Baku-chan (バクちゃん) is a Japanese manga series written and illustrated by Jūshichi Masumura. It was originally published as a webcomic on the author's Twitter account in August 2016. It was later serialized in Enterbrain's seinen manga magazine Comic Beam between August 2019 and December 2020.

== Synopsis ==
The series is centered around a young tapir boy named Baku-chan after he moves to Tokyo emigrating from a planet of tapirs, and how he adjusts to his new surroundings.

== Publication ==
Written and illustrated by Jūshichi Masumura, Baku-chan was originally published as a webcomic on the author's Twitter account on August 14, 2016. It was later serialized in Enterbrain's seinen manga magazine Comic Beam from August 10, 2019, to December 11, 2020. Its chapters were compiled into two tankōbon volumes released between May 11, 2020, and January 12, 2021.

In August 2025, Glacier Bay Books announced that they had licensed the original webcomic for English publication, with the webcomic set to be released on September 1, 2026.

No.	Release date	ISBN
1	May 11, 2020	978-4-04-736081-5
2	January 12, 2021	978-4-04-736481-3

== Reception ==
The original webcomic won the New Face Award at the 21st Japan Media Arts Festival in 2018. The series ranked tenth in Freestyle magazine's "The Best 2021 Kono Manga wo Yome!" ranking in 2020. It was also ranked 19th in Takarajimasha's Kono Manga ga Sugoi! guidebook list for best manga for male readers in 2021. Glacier Bay Books' release of the original webcomic was nominated for the Best Publication Design at the 3rd American Manga Awards in 2026.
