= Yuka (singer, born 1970) =

Japanese singer (born 1970)

YUKA, formally Yuka Muraishi (村石有香, Muraishi Yuka) and formerly Yuka Sato (佐藤有香 Satō Yuka), is a Japanese singer, born on December 10, 1970. She is best known for her work in Japanese animation, including the ending themes of several Dragon Ball Z theatrical films (with Hironobu Kageyama), as well as singing "Mirai no Kioku", the opening theme of the series Kiddy Grade. In June 2000, she married drummer Muraishi Masayuki (村石 雅行), and in 2003, gave birth to a son. Previously, she had also assumed the stage name Asakura Miyū (麻倉未有) in addition to her other names. More recently, her songs "Destiny of the Desert" and "Shinkirō" (Mirage) also appeared in the anime Desert Punk as the opening and closing songs respectively.

== Trivia ==
Her maiden name (Satō Yuka) is identical to that of a famous Japanese figure-skater.
