= Calorie no Tsuyagoto =

Japanese manga series

- First tankōbon volume cover

かろりのつやごと (Karori no Tsuyagoto)
- Genre: Romance
- Manga
- Written by: Yua Oda
- Published by: Shueisha
- Imprint: Office You Comics
- Magazine: Office You
- Original run: June 22, 2019 – present
- Volumes: 18

Calorie no Tsuyagoto (かろりのつやごと, Karori no Tsuyagoto; lit. 'Calorie's Love Affair') is a Japanese manga series written and illustrated by Yua Oda. It began serialization in Shueisha's josei manga magazine Office You in June 2019.

== Synopsis ==
Fuzuki Katori is a large woman who loves eating, but is insecure about her figure, so much so that people often tease by calling her "Calorie", and is also unsure if she wants to enter a relationship. One day, she meets a university student named Shūgo Aoi at the diner she often visits, and her life gradually changes upon meeting Shūgo.

== Publication ==
Written and illustrated by Yua Oda, Calorie no Tsuyagoto began serialization in Shueisha's josei manga magazine Office You on June 22, 2019. The series ended its first season on January 23, 2025, and began its second season on March 21, 2025. The series' chapters have been collected into eighteen tankōbon volumes as of August 2026.

No.	Release date	ISBN
1	November 25, 2019	978-4-420-15395-9
2	March 25, 2020	978-4-420-15402-4
3	August 25, 2020	978-4-420-15408-6
4	January 25, 2021	978-4-420-15415-4
5	June 24, 2021	978-4-420-15422-2
6	November 25, 2021	978-4-420-15431-4
7	April 25, 2022	978-4-420-15439-0
8	September 22, 2022	978-4-420-15445-1
9	February 24, 2023	978-4-420-15452-9
10	July 25, 2023	978-4-420-15458-1
11	December 25, 2023	978-4-420-15467-3
12	May 23, 2024	978-4-420-15472-7
13	October 24, 2024	978-4-420-15479-6
14	March 25, 2025	978-4-420-15485-7
15	August 25, 2025	978-4-420-15489-5
16	December 24, 2025	978-4-420-15494-9
17	April 23, 2026	978-4-420-15499-4
18	August 25, 2026	978-4-420-15504-5
19	December 23, 2026	978-4-420-15507-6

== Reception ==
The series won the Grand Prize in the Comics category at the 53rd Japan Cartoonists Association Awards in 2024.
