= Little Miss P =

Japanese manga series by Ken Koyama

- Cover of first volume of the manga series, featuring Little Miss P

生理ちゃん (Seiri-chan)
- Genre: Comedy
- Created by: Ken Koyama
- Manga
- Written by: Ken Koyama
- Published by: Omocoro; Enterbrain
- English publisher: NA: Yen Press
- Imprint: Beam Comics
- Magazine: Comic Beam
- Original run: January 17, 2017 – October 12, 2020
- Volumes: 4
- Live-action film

Little Miss Period
- Directed by: Shunsuke Shinada
- Written by: Shin Akamatsu
- Music by: Yui Kawachi
- Studio: Yoshimoto Kogyo; Fuji Television
- Released: November 8, 2019
- Runtime: 75 minutes

Little Miss P (Japanese: 生理ちゃん, Hepburn: Seiri-chan; lit. 'Menstruation-chan') is a Japanese manga series written and illustrated by Ken Koyama. The series follows the titular character, an anthropomorphized period, as she visits menstruating women in various scenarios and contexts. Launched as a webcomic in 2017, Little Miss P was serialized in the manga magazine Comic Beam from January 2017 to October 2020 and was adapted into a live-action film in 2019. The series has been critically acclaimed, and won a Tezuka Osamu Cultural Prize in 2019.

== Synopsis ==
Each chapter in the series follows a particular woman as she is visited by Little Miss P, an anthropomorphic representation of her period. While the women dread Little Miss P's arrival – particularly her "Period Punch", representing menstrual cramping – as an individual she is steadfast and caring, and frequently supports the women through a personal problem or emotional turmoil. Throughout the series, Little Miss P visits women in a wide range of situations and historical contexts; one particular chapter follows a woman in the Edo period who is made to live in a menstruation hut, while another is a fictionalized biography of Yoshiko Sakai, who produced the first commercial sanitary napkins sold in Japan.

== Characters ==
Little Miss P
An anthropomorphized representation of menstruation who visits women monthly. A practitioner of tough love, the fatigue and pain she imposes on the women she visits is belied by her supportive and understanding personality.
Mr. Libido
An anthropomorphized representation of sex drive. He is shaped like a cartoon penis, and speaks exclusively in lewd and obscene language.
Mr. Virginity
An anthropomorphized representation of virginity. He has a kind personality, but is somewhat coddling.
Little Miss PMS
An anthropomorphized representation of premenstrual syndrome. Appears in a bonus chapter in the collected edition of the series.

== Media ==
=== Manga ===
The series was first published in 2017 as a web comic on the comedy website Omocoro under the title Tsukiichi! Seiri-chan (ツキイチ！生理ちゃん, 'Monthly Menstruation-chan'). Kadokawa collected the series as a tankōbon bound volume in March 2018, and began serializing new chapters of series as Seiri-chan in its manga magazine Comic Beam in November 2018. That same month, Yen Press announced that it would publish an English-language translation of the series under the title Little Miss P, with the first volume released in June 2019. A Little Miss P stuffed toy was released in April 2019 to commemorate the release of the manga's second volume. The third volume was released on May 11, 2020.

| No. | Original release date | Original ISBN | English release date | English ISBN |
|---|---|---|---|---|
| 1 | June 11, 2018 | 978-4-04-735237-7 | June 26, 2019 | 978-1-97-535709-2 |
01. "Housewife and Little Miss P" (主婦と生理ちゃん, Shufu to Seiri-chan); 02. "Writer and Little Miss P" (ライターと生理ちゃん, Raitā to Seiri-chan); 03. "Convenience Store Clerk and Little Miss P" (コンビニ店員と生理ちゃん, Konbini Tenin to Seiri-chan); 04. "Superheroine and Little Miss P" (スーパーヒロインと生理ちゃん, Sūpāhiroin to Seiri-chan); 05. "Town Girl and Little Miss P" (町娘と生理ちゃん, Machimusume to Seiri-chan); 06. "High School Girl and Little Miss P" (女子高生と生理ちゃん, Joshikōsei to Seiri-chan); 07. "A Woman of a Certain Age and Little Miss P" (適齢期と生理ちゃん, Tekireiki to Seiri-chan); 08. "Cafe Worker and Little Miss P" (カフェ店員と生理ちゃん, Kafe Tenin to Seiri-chan); 09. "Grandma and Little Miss P" (おばあちゃんと生理ちゃん, Obaa-chan to Seiri-chan); 10. "Little Miss PMS" (PMSちゃん, PMS-chan)
| 2 | July 12, 2019 | 978-4-04-735697-9 | June 23, 2020 | 978-1-97-531156-8 |
11. "Little Miss P and the Lovers" (生理ちゃんと恋人たち, Seiri-chan to Koibito-tachi); 12. "The End of the World and Little Miss P" (世界の終わりと生理ちゃん, Sekai no Owari to Seiri-chan); 13. "Grade School Kids and Little Miss P" (小学生と生理ちゃん, Shōgakusei to Seiri-chan); 14. "Little Miss P of the Distant Milky Way" (はるか彼方の銀河系の生理ちゃん, Harukakanata no Gingakei no Seiri-chan); 15. "Middle School Kid and Little Miss P" (中学生と生理ちゃん, Chūgakusei to Seiri-chan); 16. "Career Woman and Something That Isn't Little Miss P" (働きざかりと生理ちゃんじゃないなにか, Hatarakizakari to Seiri-chan Janai Nanika); 17. "Idol Singers and Little Miss P" (アイドルと生理ちゃん, Aidoru to Seiri-chan); 18. "Go For It, Mr. Virginity!" (がんばれ!童貞くん, Ganbare! Dōtei-kun)
| 3 | May 11, 2020 | 978-4-04-735697-9 | August 31, 2021 | 978-1-97-533521-2 |
19. "Model and Little Miss P" (モデルと生理ちゃん, Moderu to Seiri-chan); 20. "Little Miss P and Far-off Adventure" (生理ちゃんと遥かなる冒険, Seiri-chan to Haruka Naru Bōken); 21. "Little Miss P's Time Off" (生理ちゃんのお暇, Seiri-chan no O-hima); 22. "A Burning Love and Little Miss P" (燃えるような恋と生理ちゃん, Moeru yō na Koi to Seiri-chan); 23. "Manga Creator and Mr. Virginity" (マンガ家と童貞くん, Manga-ka to Dōtei-kun); 24. "Department Store and Little Miss P" (百貨店と生理ちゃん, Hyakkaten to Seiri-chan); 25. "I'll Be Happy" (しあわせになる, Shiawase ni Naru)
| 4 | November 12, 2020 | 978-4-04-736429-5 | January 18, 2022 | 978-1-97-533657-8 |
26. "Little Miss P and the Ancients" (生理ちゃんと太古の人々, Seiri-chan to Taiko no Hitobito); 27. "What's Little Miss P" (生理ちゃんってなに?, Seiri-chan tte Nani?); 28. "Little Miss P Is Scary" (生理ちゃんってこわい, Seiri-chan tte Kowai); 29. "Lie Down!" (よこなり!, Yokonari!); 30. "Little Miss P and Health" (生理ちゃんと健康, Seiri-chan to Kenkō); 31. "Whose Little Miss P Are You?" (きみはだれの生理ちゃん?, Kimi wa Dare no Seiri-chan?); 32. "Crossroads" (分かれ道, Wakaremichi); 33. "Afterword" (あとがき, Atogaki)

=== Film ===
A live-action film adaptation of Little Miss P was announced in the February 2019 issue of Monthly Comic Beam, and was released in Japan on November 8, 2019. Similarly to the episodic structure of the original manga, the film follows three women and their interactions with Little Miss P. The film was directed by Shunsuke Shinada, written by Shin Akamatsu, and stars Fumi Nikaidō, Sairi Ito, and Risaki Matsukaze. Its theme song, "Suru", is performed by the Peggies.

== Reception ==
=== Manga ===
Little Miss P has been positively received by critics, with the web comic version of the series having been viewed over 20 million times. Comics Beat commended the series' balancing of serious and comedic elements, stating that Little Miss P "offers a necessarily complex relationship between women, their time of the month, and the world." Anime UK News called the series a "knowledgeable, thoughtful and outright fun read" and "an entertaining read on a usually taboo subject." Anime News Network praised the series' frank portrayal of menstruation, but criticized the quality of its artwork.

In the 2019 edition Takarajimasha's annual Kono Manga ga Sugoi! ranking of the best manga of the year, Little Miss P was selected as one of the top 20 titles for female readers. That same year, Little Miss P won the Tezuka Osamu Cultural Prize in the Short Work category.

=== Film ===
The Japan Times gave the film adaptation of Little Miss P 3.5 out of 5 stars, stating that despite its simplistic plot, the film is "a whimsically engaging, gently insightful look at a subject usually consigned to the shadows and passed over in silence." The film placed in fifth in mini-theater ticket sales in its opening weekend.

== Daimaru Little Miss P badges ==
In November 2019, the Umeda branch of the Japanese department store Daimaru launched a program wherein menstruating employees could elect to wear a "women's wellbeing" badge that featured the cartoon character Little Miss P. While the company stated that the program was intended to better accommodate menstruating employees, it faced criticism over its potential to subject menstruating employees to workplace harassment. Following a public outcry, Daimaru stated that it was "reconsidering" the program.

== See also ==
- Sex Ed 120%, a sex education manga which also covers menstruation.
