= Sex Ed 120% =

Japanese manga series

- Japanese edition of volume 1. Depicts (from left to right) Moriya, Aikawa, Matsuda and Kashiwa.

性教育120% (Seikyōiku 120%)
- Genre: Comedy, Sex education
- Manga
- Written by: Kikiki Tataki
- Illustrated by: Hotomura
- Published by: ASCII Media Works
- English publisher: NA: Yen Press
- Magazine: @vitamin
- Original run: January 14, 2020 – February 9, 2021
- Volumes: 3

Sex Ed 120% (Japanese: 性教育120%, Hepburn: Seikyōiku 120%) is a Japanese manga series written by Kikiki Tataki and illustrated by Hotomura. It began serialization in Kadokawa's @vitamin web platform in January 2020. ASCII Media Works has collected the series in three tankōbon volumes. The series is licensed by Yen Press in English. The series follows Naoko Tsuji, a teacher who believes the way Japan teaches sex education is so poor that she decides to teach the subject in her own enthusiastic way.

The series has been praised by critics for its comedy and how its subject matter is dealt with, while criticism has been levelled at Yen Press for giving the series a "Mature" adult rating.

== Plot ==
Naoko Tsuji is a PE teacher at Sakuragaoka Girls' High School. She has concluded that the way Japan teaches sex education is substandard, and thus decides to teach elements of the topic outside of the normal school curriculum. Tsuji thus begins teaching her pupils about masturbation, safe sex, pornography, feminism, consent, LGBT matters and other related issues, even going as far as handing out condoms, dental dams and menstrual cups to her students. Her teaching methods result in fights with the school nurse Nakazawa and the male vice-principal. Most of Tsuji's classes focus on three pupils: Moriya, a closeted lesbian who later comes out in the first volume, revealing to be in love with Aikawa, a pupil in another class; Matsuda, an otaku who loves yaoi manga; and Kashiwa, part of the school's biology club who is interested in animal sexual behaviour. As the series progresses, Tsuji reveals that she is bisexual and confesses her love for Nakazawa.

== Publication ==
The series began serialization in Kadowawa's @vitamin web platform on January 14, 2020. The second volume includes a bonus chapter featuring the real-life midwife and sex education YouTuber Shiori-nu appearing as herself, with the chapter including a QR code directing to her YouTube channel. The series is licensed in English by Yen Press.

== Reception ==
Reviews of Sex Ed 120% have been positive. Ian Wolf of Anime UK News gave the first volume eight out of ten, praising it for dealing with issues such as LGBT rights, highlighting moments such as which Moriya comes out. Anime UK News and The OASG also remarked positively on a chapter where Tsuji and Nakazawa react angrily against the homophobic owner of a love hotel. Wolf gave the second volume nine out of ten, focusing on how the manga deals with further issues such as the KuToo movement, BDSM and consent. On the last of these, he mentions how the manga not only deals with consent, but also the use of lettering by Sara Linsley in the Yen Press English release to emphasize Tsuji's point that if you do not want to consent: "SAY NO", and also the use of humor when dealing with the subject. Rebecca Silverman from Anime News Network gave the first volume of series five out of five stars, writing that: "Sex Ed 120% isn't entirely perfect, but it is a solid piece of edutainment that fills a niche that's been empty for too long." When she reviewed the second volume, Silverman also commented that the manga's coverage of menstruation was more comprehensive than the manga Little Miss P. Reuben Baron of Comic Book Resources also gave the manga a positive review, applauding Tsuji's hyperactive nature and arguing that: "It's one of the best fusions of entertainment and educational value around." Briana Lawrence of The Mary Sue liked the series because it is about trying to improve sex education rather than characters trying to have sex, and wrote that: "On top of being sex-positive, the manga is just positive all around." Adam Symchuk of Asian Movie Pulse positively commented on the characters in the series, claiming: "Kikiki Tataki has created a diverse group of individuals excited to learn about their bodies – varying in orientation and body types. Admittedly, this choice will deter those looking for the regular fan service but the realism is refreshing and more appropriate for its academic approach (educational instead of exploitative)."

Criticism was directed at Yen Press over their decision to give Sex Ed 120% a "Mature" rating. Wolf of Anime UK News argued that: "Having read it, an 'Older Teen' 16+ rating would seem to be more fitting, given the setting and what has so far been covered. This is by no means a pornographic title, with the 'Ed' being just as much of a focus as the 'Sex'." Silverman of Anime News Network claimed that: "by slapping this book with an 'explicit content' label, Yen Press risks undoing what the volume is trying to do: de-stigmatize comprehensive sex education." Baron of Comic Books Resources argued: "There's nothing objectionable for teenagers about Sex Ed 120%'s content unless you're offended by standard anatomical diagrams or abstract non-pornographic cartoon representations of sexual positions and elephant penises. High schoolers should read this book, which is both helpfully informative and far less problematic than many other manga deemed acceptable for teenagers." There was also criticism that factual information sources provided in the English-language versions of the manga were only released in Japanese, and are thus of limited use to English-language readers.
