= Mizuno and Chayama =

Japanese manga series

- First tankōbon volume cover

水野と茶山
- Genre: Romance; Yuri
- Manga
- Written by: Yuuta Nishio
- Published by: Enterbrain
- English publisher: NA: Yen Press
- Magazine: Comic Beam
- Original run: October 12, 2018 – December 12, 2019
- Volumes: 2

Mizuno and Chayama (水野と茶山) is a Japanese manga series written and illustrated by Yuuta Nishio. The manga was serialized in Enterbrain's monthly seinen manga magazine Comic Beam from October 2018 to December 2019. The story follows Mizuno and Chayama, two high school students who find themselves on either side of a political divide in their rural town.

== Plot ==
Mizuno and Chayama are student who live in a rural town that has become divided over the years, one part believes that the local tea industry is polluting the water, and the other believes the money brought in by the tea industry is too important to the local economy hamper it with pollution concerns. Mizuno's father is against the tea industry and is running for mayor, while Chayama's father owns the tea company being questioned for pollution. Despite warnings from their fathers not to associate with each other, Mizuno and Chayama begin a relationship in secret.

== Publication ==
Written and illustrated by Yuuta Nishio, Mizuno and Chayama, was serialized in Enterbrain's monthly seinen manga magazine Comic Beam October 12, 2018, to December 12, 2019. The series was collected in two tankōbon volumes on January 11, 2020.

The series is licensed for an English release in North America by Yen Press as an omnibus.

No.	Original release date	Original ISBN	English release date	English ISBN
1	January 11, 2020	9784047358584	May 10, 2022	9781975336240
1	January 11, 2020	9784047358591	May 10, 2022	9781975336240

== Reception ==
Anime News Network gave the omnibus of Mizuno and Chayama a 4 out of 5 rating, remarking of the story "it's a hopeful story that still dwells in bleakness and flirts with a relationship that could be termed unhealthy at times. It's not pretty, flowery yuri, and I like it all the more for that." Erica Friedman of Yuricon noted that while the series was "modern Romeo and Juliet. Thankfully, without the dire ending." However she gave Mizuno and Chayama and overall 6 out of 10 rating, noted that "this series was a little heavy on lowest denominator service and was not at all respectful of the characters' bodies, something I had found very appealing in After Hours. The ending a was little less ridiculous than After Hours', but I'm not entirely sure you could call it happy, though."
