= Yama Wayama =

Japanese manga artist (born 1995)

- 和山やま
- Born: January 25, 1995 (age 31); Okinawa, Japan
- Education: Tokyo Polytechnic University
- Occupation: Manga artist
- Years active: 2015–present
- Notable work: Captivated, by You
- Awards: Japan Media Arts Festival Award (2020, 2022); Tezuka Osamu Cultural Prize (2020)

Yama Wayama (和山やま, Wayama Yama; born January 25, 1995) is a pseudonymous Japanese manga artist. Born and raised in Okinawa, Wayama made her debut as a manga artist in 2015 while a student in the manga program at Tokyo Polytechnic University. After unsuccessful attempts to launch a serial manga series she began to produce doujinshi (self-published manga) to critical acclaim. Her doujinshi Captivated, by You became a critical and commercial success after being acquired and published by the publishing house Enterbrain, winning the Tezuka Osamu Cultural Prize in the Short Work category and the New Face Award at the Japan Media Arts Festival Awards. Her other series include Let's Go Karaoke! and Onna no Sono no Hoshi.

== Biography ==
=== Early life and career ===
Wayama was born in 1995 in Okinawa, where she was also raised. She attended Itoman Minami Elementary School for primary school, and Okinawa Shogaku High School for junior high and high school. In middle school she began drawing color pencil illustrations inspired by shōjo manga (girls manga) that she would upload to the blogging site Ameba, and as a senior in high school began drawing boys' love manga (male-male romance manga, abbreviated as "BL") as a hobby. She has used the pen name "Wayama" since middle school: initially "Wayama" mononymously for her Ameba illustrations, then "Tomoyoshi Wayama" (わやま ともよし) for her early manga. She eventually settled on "Yama Wayama" as her pen name, basing it off her high-school nickname "Yama-san", as she felt it was easier to remember than "Tomoyoshi".

She decided to pursue manga as a career in her senior year of high school, and entered the manga program at Tokyo Polytechnic University. Seeking to write manga about "everyday things", Wayama initially began drawing seinen manga (men's manga), as she believed that josei manga (women's manga) would not be conducive to her style. In her sophomore year she submitted her manga Yūtōsei no Mondai (優等生の問題; "Honor Student Problem") for the Chiba Tetsuya Award, and won the Newcomer's Award. This win led to the publication of one-shot (single chapter) manga Nagisa e Ikou (渚へいこう; "Let's Go to the Beach") in the Winter 2016 issue of the seinen magazine Weekly D Morning, her first paid job as a manga artist. According to Wayama, attempts to publish further works with Morning "didn't work out", stating that "part of me was only creating manga to get the approval of editors, so I'd totally lost sight of what I wanted to draw".

=== Doujinshi and breakthrough ===
After her experience at Morning, Wayama sought to create manga that she "actually liked and felt like drawing, without listening to what other people had to say." She took a job in food service and published the one-shot Ushiro no Nikaidou on the online community Pixiv to critical acclaim. Ushiro no Nikaidou would become a chapter in her doujinshi (self-published manga) Captivated, by You, which she released at the doujinshi convention Comita in February 2019. An editor at the manga magazine Comic Beam acquired the doujinshi for publication as a book, which was published in August that same year. The manga was a significant critical and commercial success, selling out three printings in one month and winning the Tezuka Osamu Cultural Prize in the Short Work category and the New Face Award at the Japan Media Arts Festival Awards.

Her subsequent manga Let's Go Karaoke! was similarly published as a doujinshi before being acquired by Kadokawa for publication. Wayama's first serial manga, Onna no Sono no Hoshi, began serialization in the josei manga magazine Feel Young in January 2020.

== Style and influences ==
Wayama primarily creates slice of life stories, stating that she "tr[ies] to keep an overall mellow energy" in her work. She cites manga artists Usamaru Furuya, Eiji Nonaka, Junji Ito, and Makoto Kobayashi as her four primary influences. She lists Furuya as her most significant influence, stating that after she read his series Lychee Light Club while in high school, she drew her first amateur manga by imitating his art style; Furuya also influenced her orientation towards junior- and high school-aged boys as primary subjects of her manga. Nonaka influenced her style of "funny manga paired with serious illustrations", while Kobayashi influenced the manner in which she draws girls. While Ito's psychological horror is not overtly reflected in Wayama's manga, she has stated that she is interested in one day drawing horror manga.

Her earlier influences include Boku to Issho by Minoru Furuya, the first manga she ever read and her favorite overall, as well as works introduced to her as a child by her older siblings: Urusei Yatsura by Rumiko Takahashi and the works of Aya Nakahara in Margaret by her older sister, and Doraemon by Fujiko F. Fujio and Yu-Gi-Oh! by Kazuki Takahashi by her older brother. Japanese films are also an influence on Wayama, particularly the "character development and warm humor" in the works of Shinobu Yaguchi.

Intimate male-male relationships are a recurring motif in Wayama's works, with journalist Atsushi Takayama describing her manga as depicting "brilliant relationships between men that go beyond friendship, but not quite to the point of romance". Wayama has acknowledged the influence of the boys' love (BL) genre on her work, stating that "I draw some things with BL in mind, and some things without it. I have a clear picture of that in my head, but I want each reader to interpret and enjoy my work how they want to."

== Works ==
- Yūtōsei no Mondai (優等生の問題; "Honor Student Problem") (published on Moae, 2015)
- Nagisa e Ikou (渚へいこう; "Let's Go to the Beach") (published in Weekly D Morning, 2016)
- Captivated, by You (self-published, 2019; published by Enterbrain, 2019)
- Let's Go Karaoke! (self-published, 2019; published by Kadokawa, 2020)
- Onna no Sono no Hoshi (女の園の星; "Hoshi of the Girls' Garden") (serialized in Feel Young, 2020–present)

== Awards and nominations ==
| Year | Nominated work | Category | Award | Result | Notes | Ref. |
|---|---|---|---|---|---|---|
| 2015 | Yūtōsei no Mondai | Newcomer Award | Chiba Tetsuya Award | Won | | |
| 2020 | Captivated, by You | Women's Manga | Kono Manga ga Sugoi! | 2nd Place | | |
| 2020 | Captivated, by You | New Face Award | Japan Media Arts Festival Awards | Won | | |
| 2020 | Captivated, by You | — | Manga Taishō | 7th Place | | |
| 2020 | Captivated, by You | Short Work | Tezuka Osamu Cultural Prize | Won | | |
| 2021 | Let's Go Karaoke! | — | Manga Taishō | 3rd Place | | |
| 2021 | Onna no Sono no Hoshi | — | Manga Taishō | 7th Place | | |
| 2021 | Onna no Sono no Hoshi | Women's Manga | Kono Manga ga Sugoi! | 1st Place | | |
| 2021 | Let's Go Karaoke! | Women's Manga | Kono Manga ga Sugoi! | 5th Place | | |
| 2022 | Onna no Sono no Hoshi | — | Manga Taishō | 4th Place | | |
| 2022 | Onna no Sono no Hoshi | Social Impact Award | Japan Media Arts Festival Awards | Won | | |
| 2023 | Onna no Sono no Hoshi | — | Manga Taishō | 3rd Place | | |
| 2024 | Fami-res Iko. | — | Manga Taishō | Pending | | |
