= Cat Companions Maruru and Hachi =

Japanese manga series

- First tankōbon volume cover

ツレ猫 マルルとハチ (Tsureneko Maruru to Hachi)
- Genre: Slice of life
- Manga
- Written by: Yuri Sonoda
- Published by: Kodansha
- English publisher: NA: Seven Seas Entertainment
- Imprint: Afternoon KC
- Magazine: Comic Days
- Original run: December 24, 2021 – present
- Volumes: 6
- icon

Cat Companions Maruru and Hachi (Japanese: ツレ猫 マルルとハチ, Hepburn: Tsureneko Maruru to Hachi) is a Japanese manga series written and illustrated by Yuri Sonoda. It began serialization on Kodansha's Comic Days manga website in December 2021.

== Synopsis ==
The series is centered around the lives of two stray cats, Maruru and Hachi. Maruru lived with a rich family who pampered him until he chased after a sparrow and ended up losing his way back home. He later meets Hachi, an experienced stray cat, and tries to tag along with him, but Hachi initially dismisses him. Later, Maruru helps Hachi out of trouble and the two begin to hang out.

== Characters ==
Maruru (マルル)
Voiced by: Koki Uchiyama (PV)
Hachi (ハチ)
Voiced by: Yūichirō Umehara (PV)
Yasuo (やすお)
Voiced by: Koki Uchiyama (PV)
Hino (日野)
Voiced by: Yūichirō Umehara (PV)

== Media ==
=== Manga ===
Written and illustrated by Yuri Sonoda, Cat Companions Maruru and Hachi began serialization on Kodansha's Comic Days manga website on December 24, 2021. Its chapters have been collected into six tankōbon volumes as of December 2024. The series is licensed in English by Seven Seas Entertainment.

==== Volumes ====
No.	Original release date	Original ISBN	North American release date	North American ISBN
1	April 13, 2022	978-4-06-527553-5	August 27, 2024	979-8-89160-218-2
1. "Maruru and Hachi"; 2. "How to Live Day-By-Day"; 3. "Hachi's House"; 4. "The Way Home for Lost Cats"; 5. "Maruru Goes Home"; 6. "The Mikeh Rescue Plan"; 7. "A Hopeless Night"; 8. "Spring Is Here"
2	October 12, 2022	978-4-06-529512-0	December 17, 2024	979-8-89160-219-9
9. "The Wanderer Cat Pelty"; 10. "Time Remaining"; 11. "Hachi's Decision"; 12. "The Last Sky"; 13. "The Story from Now On"; 14. "In a Cage for Now"; 15. "Training Begins"; 16. "The Magical Nyaaru"; 17. "Eriko-san and Sabi-neesan 1"; 18. "Eriko-san and Sabi-neesan 2"
3	April 6, 2023	978-4-06-530901-8	April 15, 2025	979-8-89160-549-7
19. "Bonds That Were Washed Away"; 20. "Traces of the Furball"; 21. "Looking for Kedama"; 22. "It's Not a Big Deal"; 23. "Infinite Tip-Taps"; 24. "The Accumulation of Each Day"; 25. "The Home Within a Dream"; 26. "A New Friend"; 27. "The Night We Carry Out the Plan"; 28. "The Gang's Back Together"
4	October 5, 2023	978-4-06-533291-7	August 5, 2025	979-8-89373-346-4
29. "We Just Moved In"; 30. "The "Warm Water" Problem"; 31. "Everyone's Struggles"; 32. "Amelie's Sunny Spot"; 33. "Things Cats Know"; 34. "The Cat Apartments 1"; 35. "The Cat Apartments 2"; 36. "The Cat Apartments 3"
5	May 7, 2024	978-4-06-535499-5	December 16, 2025	979-8-89373-585-7
37. "Yasuo the Catnapper"; 38. "Misunderstandings Between Cats and Humans"; 39. "Gureko's Next Meal"; 40. "Cats Aren't Scary"; 41. "Welcome to Tsuruneko"; 42. "It's Been a While"
6	December 6, 2024	978-4-06-537727-7	April 21, 2026	979-8-89561-538-6
43. "One-in-a-Lifetime Encounter"; 44. "Everyone's New Lives"; 45. "Talent in Full Bloom"; 46. "A Greedy Boss Cat"; 47. "Setting Sun"; 48. "Familiarity"; 49. "Temporary Truce"; 50. "Pelty's Failure"; 51. "Getting Ready for Departure"

=== Other ===
A promotional video was released on the author's Twitter account on February 22, 2024 (National Cat Day). The promotional video featured vocal performances from Kōki Uchiyama and Yūichirō Umehara.

== Reception ==
The series won the Grand Prize in the Comics Division at the 54th Japan Cartoonists Association Award.
