= Desert Punk =

Japanese manga series by Masatoshi Usune

- Cover of the first manga volume

砂ぼうず (Sunabōzu)
- Genre: Adventure; Comedy; Post-apocalyptic
- Manga
- Written by: Masatoshi Usune
- Published by: Enterbrain
- Magazine: Comic Beam
- Original run: August 5, 1997 – October 12, 2020
- Volumes: 22
- Anime television series
- Directed by: Takayuki Inagaki
- Produced by: Kazuhiko Suzuki; Takashi Watanabe; Takeyuki Okazaki; Takuya Chiba; Yoko Kawahara; Yuuichi Tanaka
- Written by: Hiroshi Yamaguchi
- Music by: Kohei Tanaka
- Studio: Gonzo
- Licensed by: Crunchyroll (Note: In North America through Crunchyroll, LLC (formerly known as Funimation).); AUS: Madman Entertainment; UK: MVM Entertainment
- Original network: MBS
- English network: US: Starz Edge, Funimation Channel
- Original run: October 4, 2004 – March 28, 2005
- Episodes: 24
- icon

Desert Punk (Japanese: 砂ぼうず, Hepburn: Sunabōzu) is a Japanese post-apocalyptic manga series written and illustrated by Masatoshi Usune, serialized in Enterbrain's Comic Beam from August 1997 to October 2020. The published chapters have been collected in 22 volumes.

The manga was adapted into a 24-episode anime television series produced by Gonzo and directed by Takayuki Inagaki with character designs by Takahiro Yoshimatsu and music by Kouhei Tanaka. It aired in Japan from October 4, 2004, to March 28, 2005. Funimation has licensed the series for distribution in the United States.

== Plot ==
After an implied global nuclear catastrophe Japan has been reduced to a desert ("The Great Kanto Desert"), and the surviving humans seek out a meager living in the hot sands. Desert Punk focuses on the adventures of a wandering mercenary named Kanta Mizuno, nicknamed Desert Punk (Sunabōzu), due to his seemingly incredible feats of skill and daring while on the job. Throughout the series, he acquires an apprentice and makes a few friends as well as many enemies.

As of 13th volume, his apprentice Taiko (also known as Kosuna) leaves his side in order to pursue her own destiny in the desert; like her former teacher, she takes a student of her own.

== Characters ==
=== Protagonists ===
Desert Punk (砂ぼうず, Sunabōzu; lit. 'Sand Brat' or 'Sand Punk')
Voiced by: Chihiro Suzuki (Japanese); Eric Vale (English)
Real name Kanta Mizuno (水野 灌太, Mizuno Kanta), he is also known as the "Demon of the Desert". A 17-year-old member of a mercenary group known as the Handyman Guild, he has garnered a reputation as the mercenary Desert Punk. His legendary reputation is due to his good luck, practicality, intelligence, sharp wit, specialist equipment and his grandiose self-promotion. His signature weapon is a Winchester M1897 Shotgun given to him by his father that uses a variety of shotgun shells. Although thought of as a despicable person, Kanta is highly professional in accomplishing any job he is given. In volume 13, he changes sides in the civil war raging between desert oases, betraying his old friends in the hope of trading them as captives for a promotion. He offers Taiko the chance to join him, telling her that she has no trade value. She declines, and after this point, Taiko becomes the main character.
Desert Punk uses his father's old Winchester Model 1897 shotgun, along with other equipment. Enemies will often mistake his rocket-powered winch as an ability to levitate and fly. He carries a massive quantity of balloons which are identical to his outward appearance to obscure his position. He also employs smoke bombs, and has sabotage devices for his own equipment in case it is stolen.
Kosuna (小砂; lit. 'Little Sand')
Voiced by: Chiwa Saitō (Japanese); Luci Christian (English)
Real name: Taiko Koizumi (小泉 太湖, Koizumi Taiko). Kosuna is the former apprentice of the Shimmer Sniper with a goal to become the desert's number one "power babe" mercenary. After the Shimmer Sniper is lying naked and defeated, Kosuna immediately abandons him and begs to be made Kanta's apprentice. He only accepts after she shows him a picture of a large-breasted woman Kosuna claims to be her mother.
Seemingly unable to complete any task by herself at first, she is an able assistant and honestly looks up to Kanta, despite his extremely perverted ways. She is very loyal and follows orders with little or no complaints. As the series progresses, Kosuna becomes an excellent mercenary, surpassing Kanta's abilities in marksmanship even when her weapon is unfamiliar or oversized. Kosuna becomes the series' main character in volume 13, after Kanta betrays his friends and she declines his offer to switch sides with him.

=== Machine Gun Brothers ===
Childhood friends of Desert Punk. They are often seen making fun of Desert Punk, though it is implied they actually respect him. In situations where they save Desert Punk, they are seen jokingly asking if they should finish him off, with quotes such as "well, time to go kill him." Kanta attempts to betray them, along with Natsuko and Kosuna, in volume 13.
Their names are based on the seasons of winter, autumn and spring respectively, while their sister's is based on summer.
Fuyuo Kawaguchi (川口 冬夫, Kawaguchi Fuyuo)
Voiced by: Jiro Saito (Japanese); Jeremy Inman (English)
Fuyuo is the biggest of the three, and is seen giving orders occasionally. His weapon of choice is a Browning M2 .50 caliber machine gun with rifle stock and forward grip.
Akio Kawaguchi (川口 秋夫, Kawaguchi Akio)
Voiced by: Otoya Kawano (Japanese); Justin Cook (English)
Akio is the second oldest brother and the biggest smart-aleck. His is seen with a weapon designated as an "M249 SAW".
Haruo Kawaguchi (川口 春夫, Kawaguchi Haruo)
Voiced by: Yasuhiro Takato (Japanese); Mike McFarland (English)
The youngest brother, Haruo carries the traits of a crybaby. He is good friends with Taiko, and uses an M60 machine gun.

=== Others ===
Junko Asagiri (朝霧 純子, Asagiri Junko)
Voiced by: Tomoko Kotani (Japanese); Stephanie Young (English)
A female rival of Desert Punk with voluptuously large breasts, she is known as the "Vixen of the Desert". She is introduced to the series in a situation where she uses her sex appeal to steal an important key from Desert Punk which he recently procured as part of a mercenary contract. Despite this and other similar actions, she remains an object of Kanta's desires, which she uses to further manipulate him. Despite often working closely together, the series never confirms if she and Desert Punk become romantically intimate.
Rain Spider (雨蜘蛛, Amagumo)
Voiced by: Norio Wakamoto (Japanese); Kenny Green (English)
A male rival of Desert Punk, he is depicted as an equal match for him in combat. He is renowned as a fearsome debt collector who is rumored to collect even the souls of his targets. While he has earned his reputation through forceful tactics, he is not against running away when he is at a disadvantage, however often his seeming retreats are merely feints from which he soon unexpectedly returns.
Natsuko Kawaguchi (川口 夏子, Kawaguchi Natsuko)
Voiced by: Yūko Minaguchi (Japanese); Jamie Marchi (English)
Sister of the Machine Gun Brothers, she was a childhood friend of Kanta. She is a proficient hand-to-hand combatant and the current idol of Kosuna.

== Media ==
=== Manga ===
Desert Punk, written and illustrated by Masatoshi Usune, began serialization in Enterbrain's Comic Beam manga magazine on August 5, 1997. Twenty-two bound volumes have been released in Japan as of November 2020. In June 2020, it was revealed that Desert Punk would end in two chapters. In August 2020, it was announced that the final chapter would be published in October. On October 12, 2020, Desert Punk finished after 23 years of publication.

=== Anime ===
A 24-episode anime television series adaptation produced by Gonzo was broadcast in Japan from October 5, 2004, to March 29, 2005. In North America, Funimation (later Crunchyroll, LLC) acquired the series in 2005. From episodes 1–12, the first opening theme is "Sand Mission" by Hideaki Takatori while the English version is by Gary Eckert. The first ending theme is "Sunabōzu Ekaki Uta" ("How to Draw Sunabōzu") by Hideaki Takatori. From episodes 12–23, the second opening theme is "Destiny of the Desert" by Yuka while the second ending theme is # "Shinkirō" ("Mirage") by Yuka. The third opening theme is "Shinkirō" ("Mirage") by Yuka while the third ending theme is "Sand Mission" by Hideaki Takatori. The English version is by Gary Eckert.

No.	Translated title/Funimation's dub title	Original release date
1	"Demon and Boobs" / "The Demon and The Double D's"; Transliteration: "Akuma to Boin" (Japanese: 妖怪と、ボイン)	October 4, 2004
The introduction of Desert Punk (Sunabōzu), where he is manipulated to fight the Kawazu gang by Junko. However, it is Junko who reaps the rewards.
2	"Sand and Rain" / "Rock, Paper, Scissors"; Transliteration: "Suna to Ame" (Japanese: 砂と、雨)	October 11, 2004
Desert Punk and Rain Spider (Amagumo) are hired by the same company to collect the debt of an old man and his daughter. Upon finding out that the old man has no assets, Rain Spider wishes to sell the daughter as payment, an idea which Desert Punk opposes. A duel for the girl subsequently ensues between the two mercenaries. Neither of them are victorious because when they stopped to rest so they can continue fighting, the old man's daughter knocks them both out with a pipe.
3	"Tank and Machine Gun" / "Fire Dragon Kong"; Transliteration: "Sensha to Mashingan" (Japanese: 戦車と、マシンガン)	October 18, 2004
Junko convinces Desert Punk and the Machine Gun Brothers to help destroy a powerful tank called Fire Dragon Kong.
4	"Sniping and Footsteps" / "An Ace in the Sand"; Transliteration: "Sogeki to Ashioto" (Japanese: 狙撃と、足音)	October 25, 2004
A sniper, with the assistance of his apprentice Kosuna, tries to hunt Desert Punk in the hopes of becoming famous for defeating the great desert demon. Kosuna begs Desert Punk to become her new master after he defeats the sniper, but he refuses.
5	"Water Well and Trap" / "The Price of Water"; Transliteration: "Ido to Wana" (Japanese: 井戸と、罠)	November 2, 2004
A village that expects to have an abundant source of water hires Desert Punk to defend the village against impending raiders. While Desert Punk waits, he lowers the villagers' morale by gluttonously consuming their food and water.
6	"Rocket and Wandering" / "Wandering Lust"; Transliteration: "Roketto to Hōrō" (Japanese: ロケットと、放浪)	November 9, 2004
Desert Punk defeats the raiders but is taken outside of the village while sleeping and left on his own with little food and water. He then tries to return to the village for payment but finds himself on the verge of death, only to be saved by the Machine Gun Brothers.
7	"Master and Disciple" / "Age Before Beauty"; Transliteration: "Age Before Beauty" (Japanese: 師匠と、弟子)	November 16, 2004
Taiko, a.k.a. Kosuna, convinces Desert Punk to make her his apprentice.
8	"The Dog-girl and Rock" / "A Dog in Heat"; Transliteration: "Inuonna to Iwa" (Japanese: 犬女と、岩)	November 23, 2004
Desert Punk crushes the cursed seal of the dog woman.
9	"Life and Game" / "All That Glitters"; Transliteration: "Jinsei to Gēmu" (Japanese: 人生と、ゲーム)	November 30, 2004
Desert Punk and Kosuna are convinced by Junko to work for an eccentric millionaire to find a lost treasure. When they find it, they are attacked by a robot guardian.
10	"Keeper and Treasure-seeker" / "A Little Bit of Wisdom"; Transliteration: "Bannin to Takara Sagashinin" (Japanese: 番人と、宝探し人)	December 7, 2004
Continuing from Episode 9, Junko betrays Desert Punk and the millionaire in hopes of keeping the treasure for herself. Desert Punk discovers that the robot guardian is really what the treasure hunter is after, and Kosuna gets revenge on Junko for her betrayal.
11	"Sin and Punishment" / "Compromising Positions"; Transliteration: "Tsumi to Batsu" (Japanese: 罪と、罰)	December 14, 2004
Desert Punk tries to make Junko his wife and have his children.
12	"Girl and Rescue" / "A Change of Heart"; Transliteration: "Shōjo to Kyūshutsu" (Japanese: 少女と、救出)	December 21, 2004
Desert Punk and Kosuna rescue a kidnapped daughter of a government minister.
13	"Ideals and Reality" / "Opposites Collide"; Transliteration: "Risō to Genjitsu" (Japanese: 理想と、現実)	December 28, 2004
Desert Punk meets Stryker, an idealistic young man trained as an elite soldier of the government.
14	"Fine Sand and Full Auto" / "Kosuna - Fully Automatic"; Transliteration: "Kosuna to Furuōto" (Japanese: 小砂と、フルオ)	January 17, 2005
Kosuna gets a new weapon to become stronger.
15	"Sibling and Childhood Friend" / "The Girl Next Door"; Transliteration: "Kyōdai to Osanajimi" (Japanese: 兄弟と、幼なじみ)	January 11, 2005
Desert Punk and the Machine Gun Brothers are hired to protect a "fertilizer" rig, but there is more going on than simply guard duty.
16	"Curry and Rice" / "A Load Of..."; Transliteration: "Karē to Raisu" (Japanese: カレーと、ライス)	January 18, 2005
Continuing from Episode 15, things have gone bad and now the rig has been captured by Rain Spider, so it is up to Desert Punk to save it.
17	"Junko and Pursuer" / "Perv in Pursuit"; Transliteration: "Junko to Tsuisekisha" (Japanese: 純子と、追跡者)	January 25, 2005
Junko comes to Desert Punk for help after Tech, a former squeeze in a corporate spying job, is looking to force her into marriage.
18	"Discouragement and Despair" / "Too Close For Comfort"; Transliteration: "Zasetsu to Zetsubō" (Japanese: 挫折と、絶望)	February 1, 2005
Continuing from Episode 17, Junko has been captured and Tech's former colleagues have arrived.
19	"Up and Down" / "Scratching the Surface"; Transliteration: "Ue to Shita" (Japanese: 上と、下)	February 8, 2005
Desert Punk has been hired in what is thought to be a search for a missing person, however he finds himself soon dragged into something he did not expect.
20	"Reverse and Convenience" / "A Raw Deal"; Transliteration: "Ura to Ben" (Japanese: 裏と、便)	February 15, 2005
Dragged into Kaizuka's organization (a.k.a. The Underground Mercenaries) to overthrow the Oasis government, Desert Punk and Kosuna must decide on their next move. The end result, however, may not bode well for Punk.
21	"Master and Disciple Part 2" / "Successor of the Desert"; Transliteration: "Shishō to Deshi part II" (Japanese: 師匠と、弟子partII)	February 22, 2005
With Desert Punk seemingly dead, Kosuna takes his place as Desert Punk II with her own apprentice, Mitz, a timid boy who is the son of Desert Punk's old master Koid and who has his own special talent. However, transitioning from apprentice to master is a bit more difficult than expected as Kosuna and Mitz take on the Kawazu gang.
22	"Rain and Sea" / "Hidden Agendas"; Transliteration: "Ame to Umi" (Japanese: 雨と、海)	March 1, 2005
The Underground Mercenaries head to Skeleton City to attend the first strategy council meeting against the Oasis government, but things are not as they seem. Kosuna and Mitz return home only to find her old friend Matsu's house engulfed in flames. Near the end of the episode there is a brief shot of Kanta.
23	"Suspicion and Ambition" / "Voices in the Wind"; Transliteration: "Giwaku to Yabō" (Japanese: 疑惑と、野望)	March 21, 2005
Kosuna mourns the loss of Matsu and ponders her current situation. The Underground Mercenaries begin to take action with their cause and embark on a mission to journey to and guard a secret laboratory, but they are interrupted by none other than Junko and a surprise guest: Kanta.
24	"Taiko and Kanta" / "The Demon Revealed"; Transliteration: "Taiko to Kanta" (Japanese: 太湖と、灌太)	March 28, 2005
With the thought of Kanta being dead quickly erased from her mind, Kosuna sets out to prove herself as a true mercenary one last time against her old master. Kanta reveals that Kaizuka may not be all that he seems to be, and the Underground Mercenaries are destroyed. Kosuna chooses to forget about her past and Desert Punk, knowing that is the only way she can truly become Kanto Desert's greatest power babe.
