= Ichirō Tominaga =

Japanese manga artist (born 1957)

- 富永一朗
- Born: April 25, 1925; Kyoto, Kyoto Prefecture, Japan
- Died: May 5, 2021 (aged 96); Setagaya, Tokyo, Japan
- Occupation: Manga artist
- Years active: 1951–2021
- Notable work: Chinkoro Ane-chan; Sekkachi Neeya
- Awards: Japan Cartoonists Association Award (1986); Medal with Purple Ribbon (1992)

Ichirō Tominaga (富永一朗, Tominaga Ichirō; April 25, 1925 - May 5, 2021) was a Japanese manga artist. He was a recipient of the Japan Cartoonists Association Award, the Medal with Purple Ribbon, and he was Honorary Director of the Kibi Kawakami Fureai Manga Museum in Okayama Prefecture.

== Career ==
Tominaga was born in Kyoto, Japan. He worked as an elementary school teacher until 1951, when, at age 26, he moved to Tokyo to work as a manga artist. He was a frequent guest on the television program Owarai Manga Dojo.
