= Cary Lewis Long =

American sculptor and conceptual artist

- Born: 1961 (age 63–64); Bakersfield, California, U.S.
- Education: University of California, Berkeley
- Known for: Sculptor, Conceptual Art
- Movement: Conceptual Art, Relational Art

Cary Lewis Long is an American sculptor, conceptual artist, and former businessman.

== Early life and education ==
Long was born in 1961 in Bakersfield, California. He studied art and philosophy at the University of California, Berkeley.

== Career ==
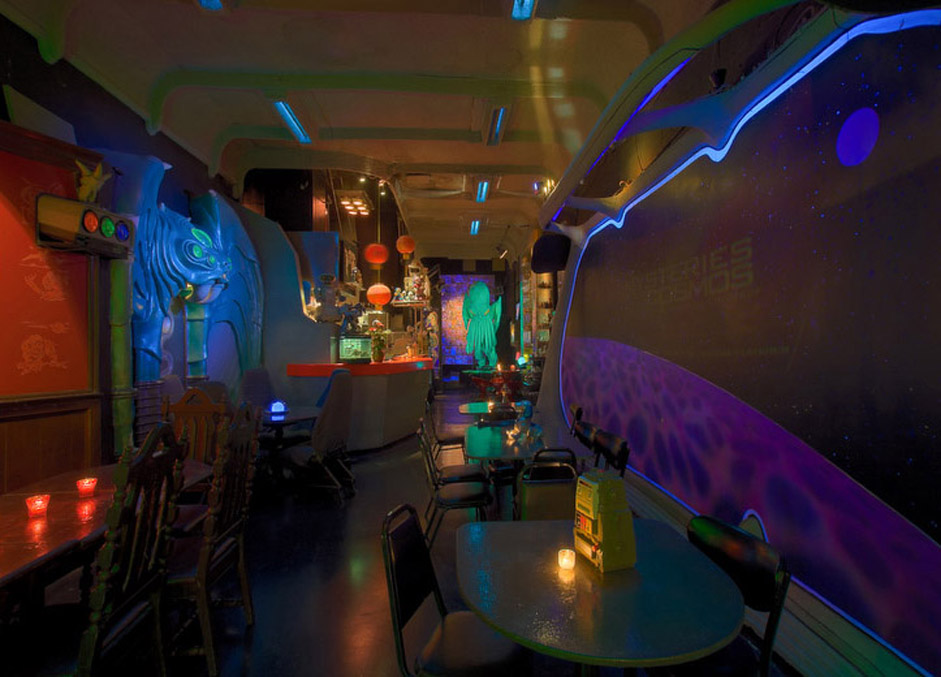
Interior view of Nova Express Cafe in Los Angeles, California

Between 1993 and 2008, Long created and operated Nova Express Café, an outer-space and fantasy-themed café and art space in Los Angeles. Much of the decor was fabricated from found objects and second-hand materials. His approach was to integrate direct experience of art with everyday life gestures as to make art widely accessible and egalitarian. Each seating area was fabricated into an imaginative fantasy zone defined by sculptural art. Many performances by poets, musicians and artists were free to the public. The singular appeal of his "walk in sculpture that sells pizza" garnered a devoted interest and following during its existence.

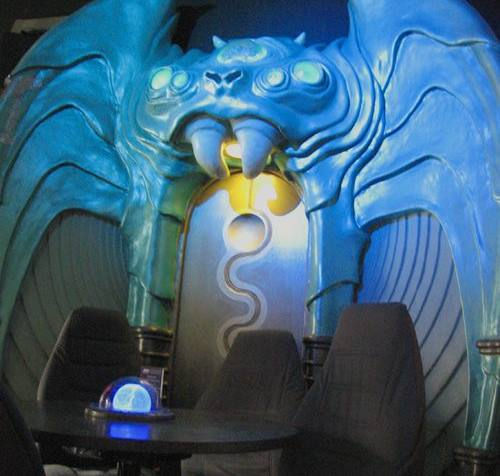
E. Pluribus Unum (Out of Many, One) installation at Nova Express Cafe.

After the closure of Nova Express Café, he began work at his Robot Iguana Studio to produce new works and sculptures.

== Personal life ==
Long lives in Los Angeles, California.

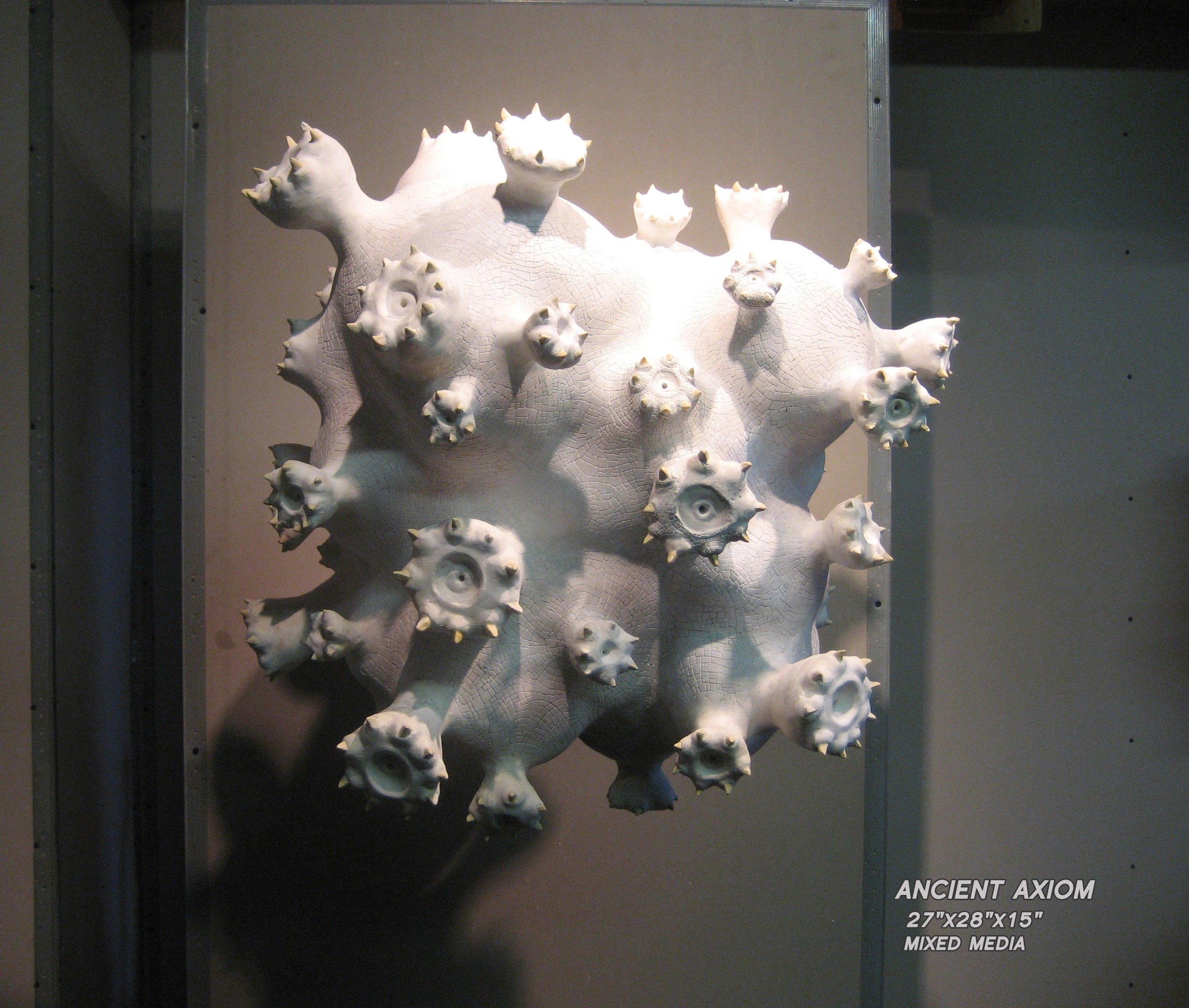
Ancient Axiom Conceptual Sculpture
