= Captivated, by You =

Japanese manga series

- Cover of the volume

夢中さ、きみに。 (Muchū sa, Kimi ni)
- Genre: Comedy; Slice of life
- Manga
- Written by: Yama Wayama
- Published by: Enterbrain
- English publisher: NA: Yen Press
- Imprint: Beam Comics
- Published: February 17, 2019 (doujinshi); August 10, 2019 (Enterbrain)
- Volumes: 1
- Television drama
- Directed by: Ayuko Tsukuhara; Eiji Takano; Moeka Miyazaki
- Written by: Kōhei Kiyasu; Manato Hamada
- Original network: MBS, TV Kanagawa
- Original run: January 8, 2021 – February 5, 2021
- Episodes: 5
- Anime television series
- Directed by: Asami Nakatani
- Written by: Yoshimi Narita
- Music by: Takurō Iga
- Studio: Doga Kobo
- Licensed by: Crunchyroll; SEA: Medialink
- Original network: AT-X, Tokyo MX, BS11, Kansai TV, Mētele, HBC, Miyatere, TVQ
- Original run: August 21, 2025 – September 18, 2025
- Episodes: 5
- icon

Captivated, by You (Japanese: 夢中さ、きみに。, Hepburn: Muchū sa, Kimi ni) is a Japanese manga written and illustrated by Yama Wayama. Originally written as a doujinshi (self-published manga) in February 2019, the manga was later acquired by the Comic Beam editorial department, who published the manga in one volume in August 2019. A television drama adaptation aired from January to February 2021. An anime television series adaptation produced by Doga Kobo aired from August to September 2025.

== Synopsis ==
Captivated, by You is an anthology series of loosely-connected stories about students at an all-boys school. Several of the stories focus on Hayashi, an aloof and forthright student, while others focus on Nikaidou, a student who has adopted a downcast and grim persona to avoid becoming close to his classmates.

== Characters ==
Miyoshi Hayashi (林 美良, Hayashi Miyoshi)
Voiced by: Kensho Ono
Jōji Ema (江間 譲二, Ema Jōji)
Voiced by: Koki Uchiyama
Akira Nikaidō (二階堂 明, Nikaidō Akira)
Voiced by: Nobuhiko Okamoto
Yūichi Medaka (目高 優一, Medaka Yūichi)
Voiced by: Yūki Ono

== Media ==
=== Manga ===
The manga was originally written as a doujinshi (self-published manga); it was sold at Comitia127 on February 17, 2019. It was later acquired by the Comic Beam editorial department, who published the manga in one tankōbon volume on August 10, 2019.

In January 2021, Yen Press announced they licensed the series for English publication. They released the volume on July 27, 2021.

=== Live-action drama ===
A live-action television drama adaptation aired on MBS TV and TV Kanagawa from January 8 to February 5, 2021. It was directed by Ayuko Tsukuhara, Eiji Takano, and Moeka Miyazaki, with scripts written by Kōhei Kiyasu and Manato Hamada. Ryūsei Ōnishi of Naniwa Danshi performed the lead role.

=== Anime ===
An anime television adaptation of the author's works, encapsulating this series alongside Let's Go Karaoke!, was announced on October 17, 2024. It is produced by Doga Kobo and directed by Asami Nakatani, with Yukiko Tsukahara serving as assistant director, Yoshimi Narita writing series scripts, Mai Matsūra designing the characters, and Takurō Iga composing the music. The series aired from August 21 to September 18, 2025, on AT-X and other networks. The opening theme song is "Rubble" (ラブル), performed by Keina Suda, while the ending theme song is "Bitansan Adolescence" (微炭酸アドレセンス), performed by Daiki Yamashita and Tasuku Hatanaka. Crunchyroll is streaming the series. Medialink licensed the series in Southeast Asia and Oceania (except Australia and New Zealand) for streaming on Ani-One Asia's YouTube channel.

==== Episodes ====
No.	Title	Directed by (Note: Production staff information is taken from the ending credits of each episode.)	Written by	Storyboarded by	Original release date
1	"Someone Cute"; Transliteration: "Kawaī Hito" (Japanese: かわいい人)	Aya Ikeda	Yoshimi Narita	Aya Ikeda	August 21, 2025
2	"Would You Be My Friend?"; Transliteration: "Tomodachi ni Natte Kuremasen ka" (Japanese: 友達になってくれませんか)	Tatsunari Koyano & Kim Seong-min	Yoshimi Narita	Tatsunari Koyano	August 28, 2025
2	"The Artist"; Transliteration: "Egaku ha" (Japanese: 描く派)	Tatsunari Koyano & Kim Seong-min	Yoshimi Narita	Tatsunari Koyano	August 28, 2025
3	"Run, Yamada!"; Transliteration: "Hashire, Yamada!" (Japanese: 走れ、山田！)	Yukiko Tsukahara	Yoshimi Narita	Yukiko Imai	September 4, 2025
4	"Nikaidou Behind Me"; Transliteration: "Ushiro no Nikaidō" (Japanese: うしろの二階堂)	Kōtarō Matsunaga	Mio Inoue	Kōtarō Matsunaga	September 11, 2025
5	"Nikaidou Behind Me: Terrifying School Trip Ver."; Transliteration: "Ushiro no Nikaidō Kyōfu no Shūgakuryokō-hen" (Japanese: うしろの二階堂 恐怖の修学旅行編)	Yōko Kanamori & Yukiko Tsukahara	Mio Inoue	Yōko Kanamori	September 18, 2025

== Reception ==
In the 2020 edition of the Kono Manga ga Sugoi! guidebook's top manga for female readers, the manga ranked second. The manga was also nominated for the 13th Manga Taishō in 2020. At the 2020 Japan Media Arts Festival, the manga won the New Face Award in the manga division. The manga also won the Short Work Prize in the 2020 Tezuka Osamu Cultural Prize.

Rebecca Silverman from Anime News Network praised the depiction of high school and artistic details of Nikaidou, while also feeling that it was too odd at points. Sara Smith from School Library Journal also praised the characters and their designs.
