= Dragon and Chameleon =

Japanese manga series

- Cover of the first volume

龍とカメレオン (Ryū to Kamereon)
- Genre: Adventure; Comedy; Supernatural
- Manga
- Written by: Ryo Ishiyama
- Published by: Square Enix
- English publisher: NA: Square Enix
- Magazine: Gangan Joker
- Original run: October 21, 2022 – present
- Volumes: 9

Dragon and Chameleon (Japanese: 龍とカメレオン, Hepburn: Ryū to Kamereon) is a Japanese manga series written and illustrated by Ryo Ishiyama. It began serialization in Square Enix's magazine Gangan Joker in October 2022. As of June 2026, nine volumes have been published.

== Plot ==
Garyo Hanagami is a well-renowned manga artist behind the popular manga series, Dragon Land. One of his assistants is the gloomy Shinobu Miyama, a man whose illustrations make people view him akin to a chameleon. After Hanagami tries to save Miyama from falling down the stairs, the two clash heads with each other and become unconscious. Some time later, Hanagami wakes up to find that he has woken up in Miyama's body, and vice versa. Miyama continues the serialization of Dragon Land in Hanagami's body, while Hanagami attempts to launch a new serialization that aims to ultimately challenge Dragon Land.

== Publication ==
Written and illustrated by Ryo Ishiyama, the series began serialization in Square Enix's magazine Gangan Joker on October 21, 2022. As of June 2026, the series' individual chapters have been collected into nine tankōbon volumes.

In January 2024, Square Enix began publishing the series in English on their Manga Up! Global service. Square Enix is set to release the series in print in Q4 2024.

=== Volumes ===
No.	Original release date	Original ISBN	English release date	English ISBN
1	April 21, 2023	978-4-7575-8531-7	November 19, 2024	978-1-64609-311-3
2	August 22, 2023	978-4-7575-8734-2	February 18, 2025	978-1-64609-328-1
3	December 21, 2023	978-4-7575-8971-1	May 13, 2025	978-1-64609-329-8
4	May 22, 2024	978-4-7575-9196-7	August 12, 2025	978-1-64609-354-0
5	September 22, 2024	978-4-7575-9428-9	November 18, 2025	978-1-64609-429-5
6	January 21, 2025	978-4-7575-9623-8	February 17, 2026	978-1-64609-449-3
7	June 20, 2025	978-4-7575-9904-8	August 4, 2026	978-1-64609-487-5
8	November 20, 2025	978-4-301-00176-8	—	—
9	June 22, 2026	978-4-301-00587-2	—	—

== Reception ==
My Hero Academia creator Kōhei Horikoshi recommended the series, describing it as "written with blood, bones, body, and spirit".

In the 2023 Next Manga Award, the series ranked 13th in the print manga category and won the U-Next Prize. The series won the Manga Kingdom Tottori award at the 53rd Japan Cartoonists Association Award. It was nominated at the Japan Society and Anime NYC's second American Manga Awards for Best New Manga in 2025.
