= Hoshitabi Shōnen =

Japanese manga series

- First wideban volume cover

星旅少年
- Genre: Science fantasy
- Manga
- Written by: Sakana Sakatsuki
- Published by: Pie International
- Imprint: Pie Comics
- Magazine: Pie Comic Art
- Original run: July 9, 2021 – present
- Volumes: 6

Hoshitabi Shōnen (星旅少年) is a Japanese manga series written and illustrated by Sakana Sakatsuki. It was originally published as a one-shot on Pie International's Pie Comic Art website in November 2020. It later began serialization on the same website in July 2021.

== Synopsis ==
The series is set in a universe filled with "slumbering planets", whose people are in a deep sleep due to the effect of poison from the Tree of Tobias. 303 works as a star tripper with Planetarium Ghost Travel, whose goal is to preserve the cultures of these planets.

== Characters ==
303
Voiced by: Soma Saito (voice comic)
505
Voiced by: Yuma Uchida (voice comic)
Stationery Store Manager (文房具屋店長, Bunbōgu-ya Tenchō)
Voiced by: Yoshino Aoyama (voice comic)

== Media ==
=== Manga ===
Written and illustrated by Sakana Sakatsuki, Hoshitabi Shōnen was originally published as a one-shot on Pie International's Pie Comic Art website on November 20, 2020. It later began serialization on the website on July 9, 2021. Its chapters have been compiled into six wideban volumes as of January 2026.

No.	Release date	ISBN
1	April 22, 2022	978-4-7562-5649-2
2	September 22, 2022	978-4-7562-5706-2
3	July 21, 2023	978-4-7562-5784-0
4	July 12, 2024	978-4-7562-5883-0
5	February 21, 2025	978-4-7562-5980-6
6	January 23, 2026	978-4-7562-6084-0

=== Other ===
In commemoration of the release of the second volume on September 22, 2022, a voice comic adaptation was released thirteen days prior. The voice comic featured performances from Soma Saito, Yuma Uchida, and Yoshino Aoyama.

== Reception ==
The series was nominated for the eighth Next Manga Awards in 2022 in the web category. The series was ranked 40th in Da Vinci's Book of the Year ranking in 2022. The series was ranked fifth in the 2023 edition of Takarajimasha's Kono Manga ga Sugoi! guidebook list of the best manga for female readers. The series was also ranked seventeenth in Freestyle magazine's "The Best Manga" 2023 edition. The series won the Grand Prize in the Manga Division at the 54th Japan Cartoonists Association Award.
