= Onna no Sono no Hoshi =

Japanese manga series

- First tankōbon volume cover, featuring Hoshi

女の園の星
- Genre: Comedy
- Manga
- Written by: Yama Wayama
- Published by: Shodensha
- Imprint: Feel Comics Swing
- Magazine: Feel Young
- Original run: January 8, 2020 – present
- Volumes: 5
- Original video animation
- Directed by: Mamoru Hatakeyama
- Produced by: Yuka Okayasu
- Written by: Teruko Utsumi
- Music by: Kei Haneoka
- Studio: Lapin Track
- Released: December 8, 2022
- icon

Onna no Sono no Hoshi (女の園の星; lit. 'Hoshi of the Girls' Garden' or 'The Star of the Girls' Garden') is a Japanese manga series written and illustrated by Yama Wayama. It has been serialized in Shodensha's josei manga magazine Feel Young since January 2020, with its chapters collected into five tankōbon volumes as of September 2026. The story follows Hoshi-sensei, a teacher at an all-girls school, navigates a whirlwind of quirky student antics and playful colleague interactions, leading to a series of offbeat comedic moments.

An original video animation adaptation produced by Lapin Track was released in December 2022. By September 2024, the manga had over 2.45 million copies in circulation.

== Synopsis ==
The series follows the everyday life of Hoshi, a male Japanese language teacher at an all-girls school. His various exploits are examined in a slice of life format, such as looking after the class pet dog, giving advice to students, and drinking with his co-workers.

== Characters ==
Hoshi-sensei (星先生)
Voiced by: Gen Hoshino
A Japanese language teacher at an all-girls school.
Kobayashi-sensei (小林先生)
Voiced by: Mamoru Miyano
A teacher at the school where Hoshi works, and friend to Hoshi.
Kagawa (香川)
Voiced by: Yumi Uchiyama
A student in Hoshi's class.

== Media ==
=== Manga ===
Written and illustrated by Yama Wayama, Onna no Sono no Hoshi began serialization in Shodensha's josei manga magazine Feel Young on January 8, 2020. As of September 2026, five tankōbon volumes have been released.

==== Volumes ====
No.	Japanese release date	Japanese ISBN
1	July 8, 2020	978-4-39-676797-6
2	May 8, 2021	978-4-39-676819-5
3	December 8, 2022	978-4-39-676869-0; 978-4-39-676870-6 (special edition)
4	October 8, 2024	978-4-39-675053-4; 978-4-39-675054-1 (special edition)
5	September 8, 2026	978-4-39-675104-3

=== Original video animation ===
In August 2022, it was announced that the manga would be adapted into an original video animation (OVA). It was produced by Lapin Track and directed by Mamoru Hatakeyama, with scripts written by Teruko Utsumi, character designs handled by Naho Kozono, who also served as chief animation director, and music composed by Kei Haneoka. The OVA is in a Blu-ray Disc that was bundled with a special edition of the manga's third volume, which was released on December 8, 2022.

== Reception ==
By September 2021, Onna no Sono no Hoshi had over 1 million copies in circulation; it had over 1.6 million copies in circulation by December 2022; and over 2.45 million copies in circulation by September 2024.

The series ranked ninth on the 2020 "Book of the Year" list by Da Vinci magazine; it ranked sixth on the 2021 list; and seventh on the 2023 list. It topped Takarajimasha's Kono Manga ga Sugoi! 2021 list of best manga for female readers; it also ranked fifth on the 2022 list. The series ranked seventh in the 14th Manga Taishō in 2021; it ranked fourth in the 15th edition in 2022; third in the 16th edition in 2023, tying with You and I Are Polar Opposites; and seventh in the 18th edition in 2025. The series ranked fourth in the 2021 Next Manga Award in the print category. It won the Social Impact Award in the manga division at the 25th Japan Media Arts Festival in 2022. The manga was nominated for the 47th Kodansha Manga Award in the general category in 2023, and the 49th edition in the same category in 2025.
