= Stardust Family =

Japanese manga series by Aki Poroyama

- First tankōbon volume cover

星屑家族 (Hoshikuzu Kazoku)
- Genre: Drama; Science fiction
- Manga
- Written by: Aki Poroyama
- Published by: Enterbrain
- English publisher: NA: Yen Press
- Imprint: Beam Comix
- Magazine: Comic Beam
- Original run: April 12, 2022 – January 12, 2023
- Volumes: 2
- icon

Stardust Family (Japanese: 星屑家族, Hepburn: Hoshikuzu Kazoku) is a Japanese manga series written and illustrated by Aki Poroyama. It was serialized in Enterbrain's seinen manga magazine Comic Beam from April 2022 to January 2023, with its chapters compiled into two volumes released in February 2023.

== Synopsis ==
The series is set in a world where children are assigned a role to determine which prospective parents are suitable to raise children in order to curtail child abuse. Hikari, an experienced evaluator, has been assigned to evaluate the Hirokawa family, a couple that cannot agree on whether or not to have children.

== Publication ==
Written and illustrated by Aki Poroyama, Stardust Family was serialized in Enterbrain's seinen manga magazine Comic Beam from April 12, 2022, to January 12, 2023. The series' chapters were compiled into two tankōbon volumes that were released on February 10, 2023.

During their panel at New York Comic Con 2024, Yen Press announced that they had licensed the series for English publication. The series was published in a 2-in-1 paperback omnibus on May 27, 2025.

No.	Original release date	Original ISBN	North American release date	North American ISBN
1	February 10, 2023	978-4-04-737351-8	May 27, 2025	978-1-97-539346-5
1. "The Nth Beginning"; 2. "The Two Subjects"; 3. "Reject"; 4. "The Shape of Happiness"; 5. "Foolish Children"
2	February 10, 2023	978-4-04-737352-5	May 27, 2025	978-1-97-539346-5
6. "Reunion"; 7. "The First Beginning"; 8. "Laceration"; 9. "Imitation"; 10. "Praying on the Shooting Stardust"

== Reception ==
The series was nominated at the Japan Society and Anime NYC's second American Manga Awards for Best One-Shot Manga Series in 2025.
