= Chen Uen =

Taiwanese manhua artist

Chen Uen 鄭問
- Born: Cheng Chin-wen 鄭進文; 27 December 1958 Bade District, Taoyuan, Taiwan
- Died: 26 March 2017 (aged 58) Xindian District, New Taipei City, Taiwan
- Awards: Japan Cartoonists Association Award, 1991

Chen Uen (Chinese: 鄭問; pinyin: Zhèng Wèn; 27 December 1958 – 26 March 2017) was a Taiwanese manhua artist. Some of his works include Magical Super Asia, Banzai and The First King. He also worked as an illustrator for Koei's Romance of the Three Kingdoms PS2 game series.

== Biography ==
Born Cheng Chin-wen (鄭進文; Zhèng Jìnwén) in 1958, he began drawing in the late 1970s, and specialized in manga starting in 1984. Soon after, Chen saw an increase in popularity as media restrictions were relaxed following the Kaohsiung Incident.

In 1991, Chen was the first foreigner to win an award at the Japanese Cartoonists Association for his work, Heroes of the East Chou Dynasty.

He died of a heart attack in 2017, aged 58.

A documentary Inside the Arts: The Profound Aesthetics -- Chen Uen was produced by Public Television Service and won a bronze medal at the 2019 New York Festivals TV & Film Awards.

== Works ==
- Heroes of the East Chou Dynasty (東周英雄伝, Tōshūeiyūden) (1990–1993, serialized in Morning, Kodansha)
- Magical Super Asia (深く美しきアジア, Fukaku Utsukushiki Ajia) (1991–1994, serialized in Monthly Afternoon, Kodansha)
- Banzai (萬歳) (1998, Kodansha)
- Shikaku Retsuden (刺客列伝) (1998, Kodansha)
- Chen Uen Gashū (鄭問画集) (1998, Kodansha)
- The First King (始皇, Shīfan) (1998–1999, serialized in Morning, Kodansha)
