= The Kaiju Autopsy =

Japanese manga series

- First tankōbon volume cover

怪獣を解剖する (Kaijū o Kaibō Suru)
- Genre: Science fiction
- Manga
- Written by: Mado Saitō
- Published by: Enterbrain
- English publisher: NA: Seven Seas Entertainment
- Imprint: Beam Comix
- Magazine: Comic Beam
- Original run: May 11, 2024 – February 12, 2025
- Volumes: 2

The Kaiju Autopsy (怪獣を解剖する, Kaijū o Kaibō Suru) is a Japanese manga series written and illustrated by Mado Saitō. It was originally published as a one-shot in Enterbrain's seinen manga magazine Comic Beam in January 2023. It was later serialized in the same magazine from May 2024 to February 2025, with its chapters compiled into two volumes.

== Plot ==
Monster scientist Akira Honda has been called up to investigate the corpse of a large kaiju nicknamed "Tokyo", a creature known to be 210 meters long and weighing 85,000 tons. As she investigates the corpse, she begins to wonder whether the creature is actually dead.

== Publication ==
Written and illustrated by Mado Saitō, The Kaiju Autopsy was originally published as a one-shot in Enterbrain's seinen manga magazine Comic Beam on January 12, 2023. It was later serialized in the same magazine from May 11, 2024, to February 12, 2025. Its chapters were compiled into two tankōbon volumes that were released on April 11, 2025.

In August 2026, Seven Seas Entertainment announced that they had licensed the series for English publication, with the first volume releasing in May 2027.

No.	Original release date	Original ISBN	English release date	English ISBN
1	April 11, 2025	978-4-04-738421-7	May 18, 2027	979-8-90209-851-5
2	April 11, 2025	978-4-04-738422-4	—	—

== Reception ==
The series' two volumes featured recommendations from director Shusuke Kaneko and animator Yōko Kuno.

The series was ranked tenth in the 2026 edition of Takarajimasha's Kono Manga ga Sugoi! guidebook's list of best manga for male readers. The series topped Freestyle Magazine's "The Best Manga 2026" ranking in 2025. The series was nominated for the 19th Manga Taishō in 2026, ranked sixth. The series won the Manga Kingdom Tottori Award at the 55th Japan Cartoonists Association Awards in 2026. The series won the New Creator Prize in the 30th Tezuka Osamu Cultural Prize in 2026.
