= Never Say Ugly =

Japanese manga series

- First tankōbon volume cover

ブスなんて言わないで (Busu Nante Iwanaide)
- Manga
- Written by: Arako Toaru
- Published by: Kodansha
- English publisher: Kodansha (digital)
- Imprint: Afternoon KC
- Magazine: &Sofa
- Original run: November 22, 2021 – October 6, 2025
- Volumes: 6
- icon

Never Say Ugly (Japanese: ブスなんて言わないで, Hepburn: Busu Nante Iwanaide) is a Japanese manga series written and illustrated by Arako Toaru. It was serialized on Kodansha's &Sofa manga website from November 2021 to October 2025.

== Synopsis ==
Tomoko is annoyed that a girl named Rika, who used to bully her during her younger days due to her appearance, is now a successful beautician. Tomoko vows to have her revenge on Rika, but later learns that she has a similar problem with lookism.

== Publication ==
Written and illustrated by Arako Toaru, Never Say Ugly began serialization in Kodansha's &Sofa manga website on November 22, 2021, as part of the website's inaugural lineup. It completed serialization on October 6, 2025. Its chapters were compiled into six tankōbon volumes, released from May 23, 2022, to November 21, 2025.

The series is published in English on Kodansha's K Manga app.

=== Volumes ===
| No. | Release date | ISBN |
|---|---|---|
| 1 | May 23, 2022 | 978-4-06-527907-6 |
1. "Uggo Right Here" (ブスはここにいる, Busu wa Koko ni Iru); 2. "Day of Action" (決行の日, Kekkō no Hi); 3. "Admiration" (憧れ, Akogare); 4. "To the Battlefield" (いざ戦場へ, Iza Senjō e); 5. "Hunk" (イケメン, Ikemen); 6. "What is Beauty Diversity?" (多様な美とは, Tayōna Bi to wa); 7. "Making Fun of Looks is Taboo?" (容姿いじりはタブー?, Yōshiijiri wa Tabū?)
| 2 | November 22, 2022 | 978-4-06-529511-3 |
8. "Makeup 'For Me'" (「自分のための」メイク, "Jibun no Tame no" Meiku); 9. "Misunderstanding" (誤解, Gokai); 10. "On a Rainy Night" (雨の夜に, Ame no Yoru ni); 11. "Someone, Please Find Me" (誰か私を見つけて, Dare ka Watashi o Mitsukete); 12. "Miss Diversity Pageant" (多様性のミスコン, Tayōsei no Misukon); 13. "The Answer Rika Came Up With" (梨花の出した答え, Rika no Dashita Kotae); 14. "Tomoko's Past" (知子の過去, Tomoko no Kako)
| 3 | July 21, 2023 | 978-4-06-531912-3 |
15. "Wearing Makeup for the First Time" (初めてのメイク, Hajimete no Meiku); 16. "As a Beauty Expert" (美容研究家として, Biyō Kenkyūka toshite); 17. "Is Having Good Looks a Talent?" (見た目の良さは才能?, Mitame no Yo Sa wa Sainō?); 18. "Consume" (消費, Shōhi); 19. "Friends" (友達, Tomodachi); 20. "Their Conflicts" (それぞれの葛藤, Sorezore no Kattō)
| 4 | March 22, 2024 | 978-4-06-534833-8 |
21. "The Power of Makeup" (メイクの力, Meiku no Chikara); 22. "Changing the World with Men's Makeup?!" (メンズメイクで世界を変える!?, Menzu Meiku de Sekai o Kaeru!?); 23. "Always, No Matter Where You Go" (いつもどこにいても, Itsumo Doko ni Ite mo); 24. "Gratitude" (感謝, Kansha); 25. "Muddled" (モヤモヤ, Moyamoya); 26. "Privilege" (恩恵, Onkei); 27. "The Anguish of a Shojo Manga Artist" (少女漫画家の苦悩, Shōjo Mangaka no Kunō)
| 5 | November 21, 2024 | 978-4-06-537169-5 |
28. "Debate" (議論, Giron); 29. "Women Who Want to Get Strong" (強くなりたい女たち, Tsuyoku Naritai Onnatachi); 30. "Changes" (変化, Henka); 31. "Spellbound" (呪縛, Jubaku); 32. "Why I Like Moe Art" (僕が萌え絵を好きな理由, Boku ga Moe E o Sukina Riyū); 33. "Parting Ways" (決別, Ketsubetsu)
| 6 | November 21, 2025 | 978-4-06-540772-1 |
34. "New Face" (新しい顔, Atarashii Kao); 35. "A New Adversary" (新たな敵, Aratana Teki); 36. "Expression" (表現, Hyōgen); 37. "Reunited" (再会, Saikai); 38. "Monster" (化け物, Bakemono); 39. "Apology" (謝罪, Shazai); 40. "Growth" (成長, Seichō)

== Reception ==
The series was ranked seventh in the 2023 edition of Takarajimasha's Kono Manga ga Sugoi! guidebook's list of the best manga for female readers. The series was nominated for the 29th Tezuka Osamu Cultural Prize in 2025. The series won the Manga Kingdom Tottori Award at the 54th Japan Cartoonists Association Awards.
