= Gou Tanabe =

Japanese manga artist

- 田邊剛
- Born: 1975 (age 50–51); Tokyo
- Occupation: Manga artist
- Known for: Adaptation of Lovecraft's work
- Awards: Nominated for the Angoulême International Comics Festival Prize; 2019 Best Comic Award Winner for the Angoulême International Comics Festival Prize; 2020 Best Series Winner for the Graphic Novel in Bram Stoker Award; 2024 Superior Achievement in a Graphic Novel

Gou Tanabe (田邊剛, Tanabe Gō) is a Japanese manga artist who is especially known for his adaptations of literary works by American writer H. P. Lovecraft. His manga has been translated into English, French, German, Spanish, Portuguese, Italian and Polish.

== Career ==
In Q4 2005, in the midst of a nonproductive period, he was exploring new ideas for "stories about monsters with no positive outcome". His publisher introduced him to the Cthulhu Mythos by Howard Phillips Lovecraft. In a subsequent interview with CNews2, Tanabe said how he was impressed by characters who "lose all hope and appetite for life. It is this common thread in Lovecraft's stories that particularly struck me".

In 2007, he drew the romantic drama Kasane (累) in the magazine Comic Beam, published in the same year by Enterbrain, as well as The Outsider (アウトサイダー), loosely adapted from H. P. Lovecraft's short story.

In 2012, he drew an adaptation of Mr. Nobody in Monthly Comic Ryū and it was also subsequently published in three bound volumes by publisher Tokuma Shoten.

In 2015, he drew Lovecraft's The Color Out of Space (異世界の色彩) in Comic Beam, which was published by Enterbrain.

In 2016, Enterbrain published further Lovecraft adaptations of The Haunter of the Dark (闇に這う者) and At the Mountains of Madness (狂気の山脈にて).

In 2018, he drew Lovecraft's The Shadow Out of Time (時を超える影), followed by The Call of Cthulhu (クトゥルフの呼び声) in 2019.

On March 12, 2021, he completed Lovecraft's The Shadow Over Innsmouth (インスマスの影).

== Honours ==
Gou Tanabe has received international recognitions for his manga adaptation of H.P. Lovecraft's works. In 2019, his adaptation H.P. Lovecraft's At the Mountains of Madness was nominated for the Best Comic Award at the Angoulême International Comics Festival. his another adaptation H.P. Lovecraft's The Shadow Out of Time went on to win the award for Best Series at the same festival in 2020.. In 2024, his another adaptation H. P. Lovecraft’s The Call of Cthulhu won the Bram Stoker Award for Superior Achievement in a Graphic Novel.

== Bibliography ==
=== Adaptations of Lovecraft's works ===
- The Outsider [アウトサイダー] (in Japanese). Comic Beam. 2007. ISBN 978-4-7577-3580-4. Stories by other authors: Anton Pavlovich Chekhov´s The House with the Mezzanine, Maxim Gorky´s Twenty-six Men and a Girl, Marley Caribu´s A Barnstormer on Pont-Neuf, Sanyutei Encho´s Kasane Souetsu Goroshi and Gou Tanabe´s Ju-ga
  To be translated in English by Dark Horse Manga in July 2027; ISBN 978-1-5067-5809-1
- The Hound and Other Stories [魔犬 ラヴクラフト] (in Japanese). Comic Beam. 2014. ISBN 978-4-04-729911-5. Also adapted: The Temple and The Nameless City
  Translated in English by Dark Horse Manga in 2017; ISBN 978-1-5067-0312-1
- The Color Out of Space [異世界の色彩] (in Japanese). Comic Beam. 2015. ISBN 978-4-04-730804-6.
  Translated in English by Dark Horse Manga in 2025; ISBN 978-1-5067-4632-6
- The Haunter of the Dark [闇に這う者] (in Japanese). Comic Beam. 2016. ISBN 978-4-04-730838-1. Also adapted: Dagon
  To be translated in English by Dark Horse Manga in April 2027 ; ISBN 978-1-5067-4633-3
- At the Mountains of Madness [狂気の山脈にて] (in Japanese). Comic Beam. 2016. ISBN 978-4-04-728316-9. 4 Volumes
  Translated in English by Dark Horse Manga in 2019 in 2 Volumes; ISBN 978-1-5067-1022-8
- The Shadow Out of Time [時を超える影] (in Japanese). Comic Beam. 2018. ISBN 978-4-04-735483-8.
  Translated in English by Dark Horse Manga in 2025; ISBN 978-1-5067-4634-0
- The Call of Cthulhu [クトゥルフの呼び声] (in Japanese). Comic Beam. 2019. ISBN 978-4-04-735853-9.
  Translated in English by Dark Horse Manga in 2024; ISBN 978-1-5067-4140-6
- The Shadow Over Innsmouth [インスマウスの影] (in Japanese). Comic Beam. 2020. ISBN 978-4-04-736660-2. 2 Volumes
  Translated in English by Dark Horse Manga in 2023; ISBN 978-1-5067-3603-7
- The Dunwich Horror [ダニッチの怪] (in Japanese). Comic Beam. 2021. ISBN 978-4-04-737400-3. 3 Volumes
  Translated in English by Dark Horse Manga in 2026; ISBN 978-1-5067-5348-5
- The Cats of Ulthar and Other Stories About Dreamlands [ウルタールの猫] (in Japanese). Comic Beam. 2023. ISBN 978-4-04-737907-7. Also adapted: Celephaïs and The Other Gods
- The Unnamable and Other Stories About Dreamlands [名状しがたいもの] (in Japanese). Comic Beam. 2024. ISBN 978-4-04-738276-3. Also adapted: To a Dreamer, Polaris, The Terrible Old Man, The Strange High House in the Mist, The Statement of Randolph Carter, The Silver Key, and Azathoth
- The Case of Charles Dexter Ward [チャールズ・ウォードの奇怪な事件] (in Japanese). Comic Beam. 2026. Ongoing
  To be translated in English by Dark Horse Manga in March 2027; ISBN 978-1-5067-5914-2

=== Series ===
- Kasane (累) Based on the rakugo horror story Ghosts of Kasane Swamp by Sanyutei Encho.
  - Volume 1, 2007
  - Volume 2, 2007
- Genius Loci (ゲニウス・ロキ 異形建築家阿修羅帖控)
  - Volume 1, 2011
- Mr. Nobody
  - Volume 1, 2012
  - Volume 2, 2013
  - Volume 3, 2014
- Saudade (サウダージ) Based on Lafcadio Hearn's The Story of O-Tei, Franz Kafka's A Hunger Artist, Tao Yuanming's The Peach Blossom Spring and 3 original stories by Marley Caribu: Fortune Teller Warika, Hanging stand and Competition
  - Volume 1, 2015

== See also ==
- Cthulhu Mythos in popular culture
