= Cocoon Entwined =

Japanese manga series

- First tankōbon volume cover

繭、纏う (Mayu, Matō)
- Genre: Drama; Yuri
- Manga
- Written by: Yuriko Hara
- Published by: Enterbrain
- English publisher: NA: Yen Press
- Magazine: Comic Beam
- Original run: February 10, 2018 – December 12, 2022
- Volumes: 6

Cocoon Entwined (Japanese: 繭、纏う, Hepburn: Mayu, Matō) is a Japanese manga series written and illustrated by Yuriko Hara. It was serialized in Enterbrain's Comic Beam from February 2018, to December 2022, and was licensed for an English-language release by Yen Press in 2019.

== Plot ==
The students of Hoshimiya Girls' Academy wear beautiful uniforms punctuated by their long, lustrous hair. Triggered by a certain "incident" that shakes paradise, their hidden feelings begin to entangle.

== Publication ==
Written and illustrated by Yuriko Hara, Cocoon Entwined was serialized in Enterbrain's Comic Beam from February 10, 2018, to December 12, 2022. The series was collected in six tankōbon volumes from September 2018 to January 2023.

The series is licensed for an English release in North America by Yen Press.

No.	Original release date	Original ISBN	English release date	English ISBN
1	September 12, 2018	978-4-04-735319-0	July 30, 2019	978-1-97-538424-1
2	August 10, 2019	978-4-04-735708-2	March 24, 2020	978-1-97-539939-9
3	June 12, 2020	978-4-04-736154-6	July 27, 2021	978-1-97-533389-8
4	April 12, 2021	978-4-04-736608-4	January 25, 2022	978-1-97-533973-9
5	January 12, 2023	978-4-04-737289-4	January 25, 2024	978-1-97-538807-2
6	January 12, 2023	978-4-04-737336-5	May 21, 2024	978-1-97-538809-6

== Reception ==
The series has received positive reviews. Rebecca Silverman of Anime News Network gave Cocoon Entwined's volume 1 an overall B− rating, remarking that the first volume felt like a prelude that while interesting, hasn't quite gotten off the ground yet, concluding that "If volume two is able to solidify things more, this could be a series worth keeping an eye on." Alternately, Brittany Vincent, reviewing the series for Otaku USA, praised the first volumes pacing, stating that "some may find Cocoon Entwined a bit slow, but its pace is deliberate, the romantic plots develop at a satisfying slow burn, and its tone is entrancing." Erica Friedman of Yuricon gave the final volume a 9 out of 10 rating and praised the series overall; "I found this series fascinating, occasionally creepy, always fraught...but this was exactly the right ending. And beautifully drawn as the whole series has been. [...] As a final punctuation on the tropes of private girls' school Yuri from a century ago, this series was a perfect farewell."
