= Lost Lad London =

Japanese manga series

- First tankōbon volume cover

ロスト・ラッド・ロンドン (Rosuto Raddo Rondon)
- Genre: Drama; Mystery; Suspense
- Manga
- Written by: Shima Shinya
- Published by: Enterbrain
- English publisher: NA: Yen Press
- Imprint: Beam Comix
- Magazine: Comic Beam
- Original run: December 12, 2019 – May 12, 2021
- Volumes: 3

Lost Lad London (Japanese: ロスト・ラッド・ロンドン, Hepburn: Rosuto Raddo Rondon) is a Japanese manga series written and illustrated by Shima Shinya. It was serialized in Enterbrain's Comic Beam manga magazine from December 2019 to May 2021.

== Synopsis ==
On the way back to his university accommodation, Al Adley later discovers that he has been framed for murdering the Mayor of London after finding that the knife used in the murder was in his pocket. Detective Ellis reaches out to Al to hear his side of the story, and once he hears Al's story, he proposes that they work together to find who real culprit of the murder.

== Publication ==
Written and illustrated by Shima Shinya, Lost Lad London was serialized in Enterbrain's Comic Beam manga magazine from December 12, 2019, to May 12, 2021. Its chapters were collected into three tankōbon volumes released from January 12 to June 11, 2021.

During their panel at New York Comic Con 2021 panel, Yen Press announced that they licensed the series for English publication.

| No. | Original release date | Original ISBN | North American release date | North American ISBN |
|---|---|---|---|---|
| 1 | January 12, 2021 | 978-4-04-736484-4 | May 24, 2022 | 978-1-97-534082-7 |
Chapters 1–6
| 2 | January 12, 2021 | 978-4-04-736485-1 | August 30, 2022 | 978-1-97-534161-9 |
Chapters 7–12
| 3 | June 11, 2021 | 978-4-04-736688-6 | January 17, 2023 | 978-1-97-534526-6 |
Chapters 13–18

== Reception ==
The series won a New Face Award in the Manga Division at the 25th Japan Media Arts Festival in 2022.
