= Sukima =

Japanese manga series

- First tankōbon volume cover

隙間
- Manga
- Written by: Yan Gao
- Published by: Enterbrain
- Imprint: Beam Comix
- Magazine: Comic Beam
- Original run: April 12, 2023 – May 12, 2025
- Volumes: 4

Sukima (隙間) is a Japanese manga series written and illustrated by Yan Gao. It was serialized in Enterbrain's seinen manga magazine Comic Beam from April 2023 to May 2025, with its chapters compiled into four tankōbon volumes. The series is based on the author's experiences as a Taiwanese exchange student in Okinawa.

== Synopsis ==
Yang Yang is a university student in Taipei who desires to not be alone. Her grandmother recently just passed away, and the man she had feelings for is in a relationship with another girl. These incidents make her depressed, and lead Yang to move to Okinawa as an exchange student in order to find herself.

== Publication ==
Written and illustrated by Yan Gao, Sukima was serialized in Enterbrain's seinen manga magazine Comic Beam from April 12, 2023, to May 12, 2025. Its chapters were compiled into four tankōbon volumes released from February 12 to June 12, 2025.

No.	Release date	ISBN
1	February 12, 2025	978-4-04-738148-3
2	February 12, 2025	978-4-04-738149-0
3	April 11, 2025	978-4-04-738428-6
4	June 12, 2025	978-4-04-738453-8

== Reception ==
The series has been recommended by film director Hirokazu Kore-eda and manga artist Hisashi Eguchi.

The series was ranked second in the 2026 edition of Takarajimasha's Kono Manga ga Sugoi! guidebook's list of the best manga for female readers. The series was ranked second in Freestyle Magazine's "The Best Manga 2026" ranking in 2025. The series was nominated for the 30th Tezuka Osamu Cultural Prize in 2026. The series won the Manga Kingdom Tosa Award at the 55th Japan Cartoonists Association Awards in 2026.
