= Let's Go Karaoke! =

Japanese manga series

- Collected volume cover, featuring Kyouji (left) and Satomi (right)

カラオケ行こ! (Karaoke Iko!)
- Genre: Comedy
- Created by: Yama Wayama
- Manga
- Written by: Yama Wayama
- Published by: Enterbrain
- English publisher: NA: Yen Press
- Imprint: Beam Comics
- Published: August 25, 2019 (doujinshi); September 12, 2020 (book)
- Volumes: 1
- Manga

Fami-res Iko
- Written by: Yama Wayama
- Published by: Enterbrain
- Magazine: Comic Beam
- Published: November 12, 2020
- Volumes: 2
- Live-action film
- Directed by: Nobuhiro Yamashita
- Produced by: Hiroyuki Negeshi
- Written by: Akiko Nogi
- Music by: Hiroko Sebu
- Released: January 12, 2024
- Runtime: 107 minutes
- Anime television series
- Directed by: Asami Nakatani
- Written by: Yoshimi Narita
- Music by: Takurō Iga
- Studio: Doga Kobo
- Licensed by: Crunchyroll; OC/SEA: Medialink
- Original network: AT-X, Tokyo MX, BS11, Kansai TV, Mētele, HBC, Miyatere, TVQ
- Original run: July 24, 2025 – September 25, 2025
- Episodes: 5
- icon

Let's Go Karaoke! (Japanese: カラオケ行こ!, Hepburn: Karaoke Iko!) is a Japanese manga series written and illustrated by Yama Wayama. The series follows a yakuza lieutenant who seeks instruction in karaoke from the head of a junior high school choir. It was originally published as a doujinshi (self-published manga) in 2019 before being published as a book by Kadokawa Future Publishing in 2020. A sequel, Fami-res Iko (ファミレス行こ。; lit. 'Let's Go to the Family Restaurant') began publishing in the November 2020 issue of the manga magazine Comic Beam and ended serialization on February 12th, 2026. A live-action film adaptation premiered in Japan in January 2024. An anime television series adaptation produced by Doga Kobo aired from July to September 2025.

== Synopsis ==
Satomi Oka, the third-year head of a junior high school choir, is in preparations for his final performance before graduating. After seeing him perform, yakuza lieutenant Kyouji Narita asks Satomi to coach him in singing in advance of an annual karaoke competition held by his boss.

== Characters ==
Satomi Oka (岡 聡実, Oka Satomi)
Voiced by: Shun Horie
Portrayed by: Jun Saitō
Kyouji Narita (成田 狂児, Narita Kyouji)
Voiced by: Daisuke Ono
Portrayed by: Go Ayano
Wada (和田)
Voiced by: Shinnosuke Tokudome

== Development and release ==
Series creator Yama Wayama originally approached the manga magazine Morning to write a manga series about the yakuza, though the editors of the magazine declined her pitch. Having previously authored doujinshi (self-published manga), Wayama elected to instead publish the story in this format. She originally conceived of the story as one where a yakuza becomes a school teacher, but decided to instead make a story about a "bromance" between two characters with a significant age difference, ultimately settling on the final concept of the story.

The doujinshi was originally sold at the 129th edition of the doujinshi convention COMITIA on August 25, 2019. It sold out at the event and was re-released several times via mail order, but nevertheless sold out frequently and became difficult to obtain. Enterbrain acquired the series to publish as a collected edition, which was released on September 12, 2020. The collected edition contains a newly illustrated chapter depicting Kyouji's past, as well as general additions and corrections to the art and dialogue. An English-language translation was published by Yen Press on May 24, 2022.

A one-shot sequel, Fami-res Iko (ファミレス行こ。; lit. 'Let's Go to the Family Restaurant'), was published in the December 2020 issue of Enterbrain's manga magazine Comic Beam on November 12, 2020, and ended in the March 2026 issue on February 12th, 2026. The one-shot depicts Satomi as a freshman in college. The bonus chapter from the Enterbrain edition was re-published in the May 2021 issue of Comic Beam, published on April 12, 2021.

== Adaptations ==
=== Reading play ===
A reading play of Let's Go Karaoke! was performed at Tokorozawa Sakura Town in Tokorozawa, Saitama on December 19, 2021. The performance starred Taichi Ichikawa as Satomi, Takuya Eguchi as Kyouji, and Kenta Miyake as Kyouji's boss. A Let's Go Karaoke-themed pop-up cafe was hosted at the EJ Anime Theater in Shinjuku, Tokyo from December 4 to 26, 2021, to promote the reading play.

=== Live-action film ===
A live-action film adaptation, directed by Nobuhiro Yamashita and written by Akiko Nogi, premiered on January 12, 2024. It had been scheduled to be released in 2023, but was delayed. The film stars Jun Saitō as Satomi and Go Ayano as Kyouji and won the Nippon Cinema Award of the 24th Nippon Connection film festival.

==== Cast ====
- Kyouji Narita: Go Ayano
- Satomi Oka: Jun Saitō

===== Morioka Junior High School =====
- Momo Morimoto: Kyoko Yoshine
- Nakagawa: Miki Yagi
- Ikegami: Rin Serizawa

===== Matsuribayashi-gumi =====
- Kobayashi: Jun Hashimoto
- Karata: Kyosuke Yabe
- Ginji: Shuhei Yoshinaga
- Ogata: Chance Oshiro
- Mine: RED RICE
- Minami: Ryushin Tei
- Dojima: Kento Imamura
- Shindo: Kuu Izima
- Young yakuza member: Mitsuru Manpuku
- Matsuribayashi-gumi head: Kazuki Kitamura
- Tamai: Ryotaro Yonemura

===== Others =====
- Yuko Oka: Maki Sakai
- Harumi Oka: Tomu Miyazaki
- Kazuko: Hiccorohee
- Akira Tanaka: Masaya Kato
- Kyoko Narita: Rinko Kawakami
- Kyoichi Narita: Sena Takeno

=== Anime ===
An anime television adaptation of the author's works, encapsulating this series alongside Captivated, by You, was announced on October 17, 2024. It is produced by Doga Kobo and directed by Asami Nakatani, with Yukiko Tsukahara serving as assistant director, Yoshimi Narita writing series scripts, Mai Matsūra designing the characters, and Takurō Iga composing the music. The series aired from July 24 to September 25, 2025, on AT-X and other networks. The opening theme song is "Howl", performed by Ayumu Imazu. Crunchyroll is streaming the series. Medialink licensed the series in Southeast Asia and Oceania (except Australia and New Zealand) for streaming on Ani-One Asia's YouTube channel.

==== Episodes ====
No.	Title	Directed by (Note: Production staff information is taken from the ending credits of each episode.)	Storyboarded by	Original release date
1	"The Encounter"; Transliteration: "Deai" (Japanese: 出会い)	Asami Nakatani	Asami Nakatani	July 24, 2025
2	"Nightmare"; Transliteration: "Akumu" (Japanese: 悪夢)	Yukiko Tsukahara	Yukiko Tsukahara	July 31, 2025
3	"Parting Ways"; Transliteration: "Wakare" (Japanese: 別れ)	Kōtarō Matsunaga	Kōtarō Matsunaga	August 7, 2025
4	"Crimson"; Transliteration: "Kurenai" (Japanese: 紅)	Tatsunari Koyano & Asami Nakatani	Asami Nakatani	August 14, 2025
5	"Life Gone Awry"; Transliteration: "Haguruma" (Japanese: 歯車)	Asami Nakatani	Asami Nakatani	September 25, 2025

== Reception ==
By October 2022, Let's Go Karaoke! had over 500,000 copies in circulation.

The series was nominated for the 14th Manga Taishō in 2021, placing third; it was nominated for the 17th edition in 2024. It ranked fourth in the 2021 edition of Kono Manga wo Yome!; and was also ranked in the women's edition of the 2021 Kono Manga ga Sugoi!, placing fifth.

The live-action film debuted at eighth at the Japanese box office on its opening weekend, and seventh on the following weekend.

Jeremy Tauber from Anime News Network gave the 2025 adaptation a B+ rating. Tauber concludes that the anime succeeds in making its absurd premise feel credible and in fleshing out the "odd relationship" between two people as opposite as Satomi and Kyouji, though the review also points out that little changes in the fundamental nature of the two leads over the course of the anime's five episodes, including Kyouji's character as a yakuza member.
