= Hereditary Triangle =

Japanese manga series

- First tankōbon volume cover

世襲制トライアングル (Seshū-sei Toraianguru)
- Genre: Romantic drama
- Manga
- Written by: Fumiya Hayashi
- Published by: Enterbrain
- English publisher: NA: Yen Press
- Imprint: Beam Comix
- Magazine: Comic Beam
- Original run: November 12, 2021 – September 12, 2022
- Volumes: 2
- icon

Hereditary Triangle (Japanese: 世襲制トライアングル, Hepburn: Seshū-sei Toraianguru) is a Japanese manga series written and illustrated by Fumiya Hayashi. It was serialized in Enterbrain's Comic Beam magazine from November 2021 to September 2022.

== Synopsis ==
Koutarou Fujiki was in a love triangle with his best friend Toru Kajiwara and their shared love interest Touko. The love triangle ended when Kajiwara suddenly disappeared. Now in his adult years, Koutarou is now married to Touko, but still thinks about Kajiwara's disappearance, and whether if Touko would have chosen differently if Kajiwara were still around. When Koutarou visits his hometown, he meets a boy who bears a striking resemblance to Kajiwara.

== Publication ==
Written and illustrated by Fumiya Hayashi, Hereditary Triangle was serialized in Enterbrain's Comic Beam magazine from November 12, 2021, to September 12, 2022. The series' chapters were compiled into two tankōbon volumes that were released on October 12, 2022.

During their panel at Anime Expo 2024, Yen Press announced that they had licensed the series for English publication. The series was published in a 2-in-1 hardcover omnibus on December 17, 2024.

No.	Original release date	Original ISBN	North American release date	North American ISBN
1	October 12, 2022	978-4-04-737217-7	December 17, 2024	978-1-97-538012-0
1. "Reunion"; 2. "Father and Son"; 3. "Cleanup"; 4. "Confession"; 5. "Misgivings"
2	October 12, 2022	978-4-04-737218-4	December 17, 2024	978-1-97-538012-0
6. "A Date"; 7. "New Misgivings"; 8. "The Beach"; 9. "Solving the Mystery"; 10. "Until We Meet Again"

== Reception ==
The series has been nominated for the Eisner Award in the Best U.S. Edition of International Material—Asia category in 2025.
