= Usune Masatoshi =

Japanese manga artist

Masatoshi Usune
- Born: March 10, 1961 (age 64); Chiba, Japan
- Occupation: Manga artist

Masatoshi Usune (うすね 正俊, Usune Masatoshi; born March 10, 1961) is a Japanese manga artist.

== Works ==
- Killer Boy (1985)
- Metal Box (1989)
- Eater (1991)
- Desert Punk (1997)
