= Keiichi Koike =

Japanese manga artist

Keiichi Koike 小池桂一
- Born: 1960 (age 65–66) Tokyo
- Notable works: Ultra Heaven

Keiichi Koike (小池桂一, Koike Keiichi) (born in 1960) is a Japanese manga artist.

Born in Tokyo, Koike won the prestigious Tezuka Award in 1976, when he was 16.

His style, similar to Katsuhiro Otomo and Moebius, is marked by vivid representations of psychedelic experiences.

Drugs are an important part of his inspiration: "Except peyotl, I have tried almost everything: hashish, heroin, cocain, acid, magic mushrooms... From a strictly graphical point of view, however, LSD is most important by far..." He is best known as the author of manga Heaven's Door and Ultra Heaven.

His work was first presented to English audiences in 2016.

== Works ==
- 1985: Shadow Man
- 1985–1986: Spinoza
- 1988: Katajikenai
- 1988: G
- 1989–1991: Astroid
- 2002–hiatus: Ultra Heaven
- 2003: Heaven's Door
