= Ultra Heaven =

Japanese manga series

- Cover of the first volume, showing Kabu during a trip

ウルトラヘヴン (Urutora Hevun)
- Genre: Psychedelic
- Manga
- Written by: Keiichi Koike
- Published by: Enterbrain
- English publisher: NA: Last Gasp
- Magazine: Comic Beam
- Original run: July 2001 – present (on hiatus)
- Volumes: 3

Ultra Heaven (Japanese: ウルトラヘヴン, Hepburn: Urutora Hevun) is a Japanese manga series written and illustrated by Keiichi Koike. It was serialized intermittently in Enterbrain's seinen manga magazine Comic Beam starting in its July 2001 issue and has been collected into three tankōbon. The manga is set in a future where drugs are legally sanctioned and follows the addict Kabu's experiences as he tries a drug called "Ultra Heaven" and experiments with devices called amplifiers.

== Plot ==
Volume 1

Kabu is a junkie and dealer with suicidal tendencies. Drugs are injected through tubes called "pumps" or little patches placed on the skin. Kabu's drug of choice is called "Peter Pan," a euphoric hallucinogen. The drug isn't really doing it for him anymore, so he goes to pump bars and tries dangerous drug combinations that might kill him, so he can have the ultimate high of a near-death experience. He goes to a pump bar and asks for a dangerous mixture of drugs, but instead the maestro gives him a special called "Nova Express," which simulates the experience of dying. After the trip, Kabu stumbles out of the bar in a daze, closely watched by two mysterious salarymen who comment that a junkie like Kabu would be the perfect subject for their experiment.

After taking Nova Express, Kabu briefly tries to clean up and start over, but his friend Seven shows up with some Peter Pan and Kabu is back on a desperate search for more. Nobody seems to have Peter Pan anymore, but there are rumors of an even stronger drug that is the most powerful hallucinogen invented.

Kabu goes to a park with a friend. A walleyed drug pusher approaches him and offers him Peter Pan. He claims it is "special" and Kabu doesn't have to pay him unless he loves it. Kabu tries the drug and has a nightmarish trip where he cannot separate his body from objects around him and he ends up killing two sanitation officers. He runs from the scene of the crime and bumps into the drug pusher. The pusher tells him he's been tripping for days and the dream he had was "more real than life itself." The pusher says the only cure for the nightmare is jump into another dream with another hit of the drug. Kabu says the words "Ultra Heaven" in reference to the drug, and the pusher implies that it makes sense that Kabu would be the one to name it that way, before disappearing. Since Kabu is still in the last nightmare, more sanitation agents show up and surround him. Kabu takes more Ultra Heaven to escape the agents. An agent shoots Kabu in the head and he enters a trip that lands him in a hygiene department recovering from a drug overdose. The doctors panic when it appears that Kabu's brain is dying. Kabu flies through a mountain paradise. He finally wakes up in the pond in the park, with the pusher laughing hysterically at him nearby.

== Release ==
The manga was serialized in Enterbrain's seinen manga magazine Comic Beam starting in its July 2001 issue, with several hiatuses. Enterbrain collected the manga into three tankōbon with the first on February 25, 2002, the second on March 25, 2005, and the third on November 26, 2009. The manga has been licensed in France by Glénat and in Italy by D/visual (later acquired by GP Manga). In February 2024, Last Gasp announced that they licensed the series for English publication.

== Reception ==
The first volume has been nominated for the Best Translation category in the 2nd edition of Anime NYC and Japan Society's American Manga Awards in 2025.
