= Nova Express Café =

Café and restaurant in Los Angeles, California, U.S.

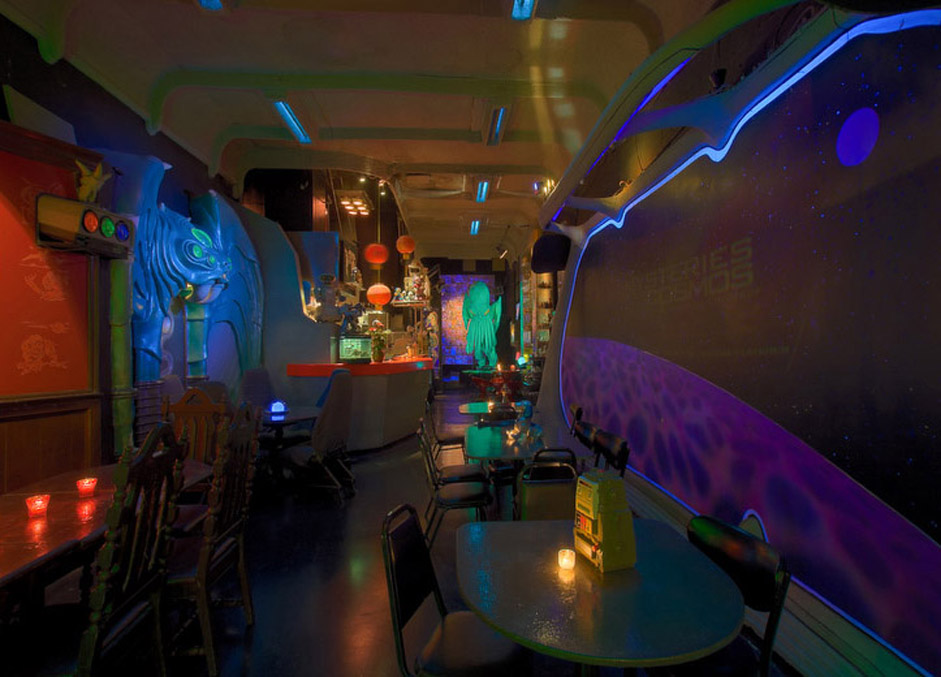
Interior of Nova Express Cafe; Photo by Joel Mark

The Nova Express Café was a science-fiction-themed cafe and restaurant in Los Angeles, named as an homage to the William S. Burroughs satirical sci-fi novel, Nova Express. It was located across the street from Canter's Deli, and adjacent to the original location of Largo. The business was in operation for 15 years, from June 1993 until March 2008.

== History ==
The establishment was the creation of sculptor and conceptual artist Cary Lewis Long and Argentinian actress Victoria Judith Adji Keter. Long studied art and philosophy at Berkeley, and saw the project as an integration of art and society. Besides serving food and drink, Nova Express Cafe was a venue for experimental music and performance, poetry readings, rock bands, storytelling and art events.

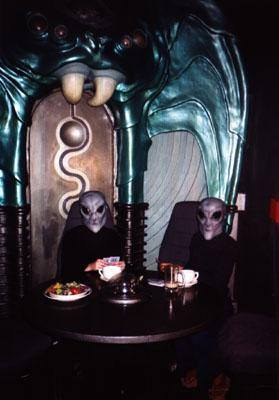
Serving Alien Intelligence

Working with a limited budget, the Cafe was made almost entirely from found and second-hand materials. A fan of fantasy architecture, Long painted many surfaces to fluoresce under black light, including ameoba-shaped tables and a silhouette-filled screen constructed with stencils made with an X-Acto knife, auto paint and a pizza box. The rocket-like chairs were found at the Pick Your Parts junkyard and refurbished."

In a farewell missive, Long said: “I believe the humanizing benefits of art are profoundly important, and I also think that there should just be more art in the world. My hope was to present art under conditions that were open and direct; as part of what it would mean to live in a more open society. Nova Express Cafe was meant to illustrate how art might function in a more democratic, evenly distributed, and less exclusive way.”

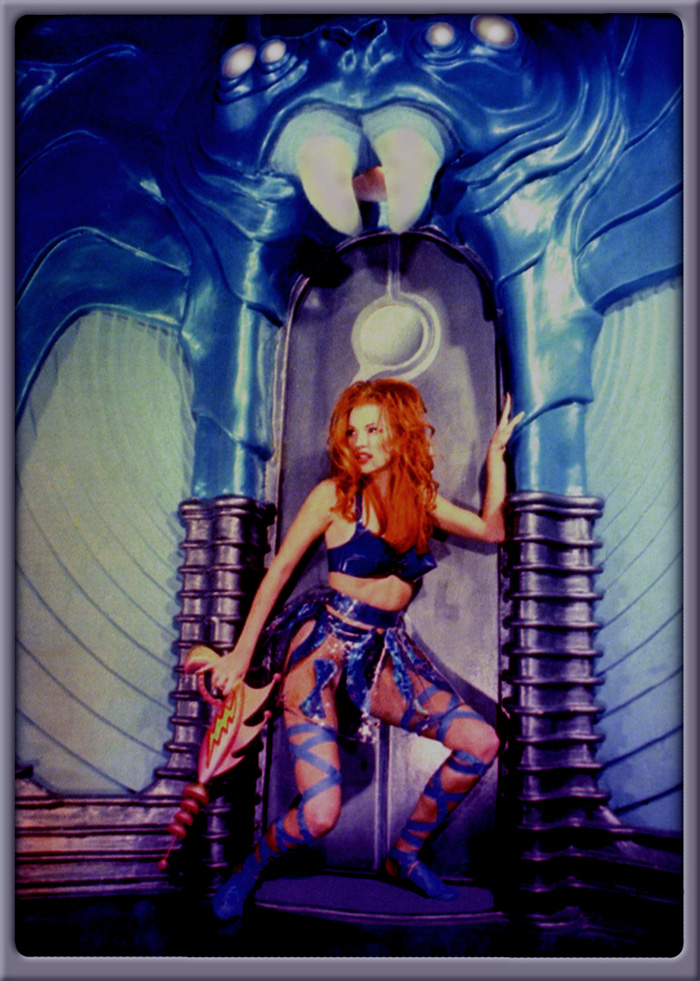
E. Pluribus Unum, (Out of Many, One) sculpture by Cary Lewis Long at Nova Express Cafe; Photo by Jack Pedota

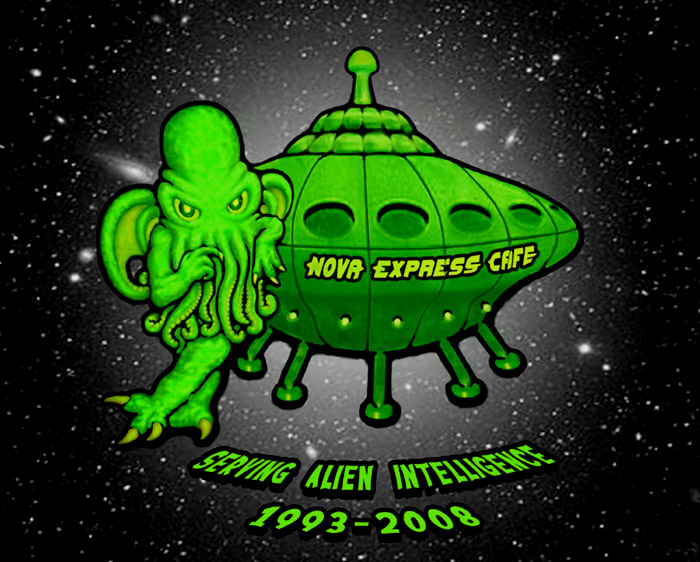
Serving Alien Intelligence; design by Cary Lewis Long
