= The Colour Out of Space (comic book) =

2015 comic book by Gou Tanabe

The Colour Out of Space (異世界の色彩)
- Page count: 185 pages
- Publisher: Enterbrain

Creative team
- Writer: Gou Tanabe, after H. P. Lovecraft
- Artist: Gou Tanabe

Original publication
- Date of publication: 25 September 2015
- Language: Japanese
- ISBN: 978-4-04-730804-6

Translation
- Publisher: Dark Horse Comics
- Date: 1 July 2025
- ISBN: 978-1-5067-4632-6
- Translator: Zack Davisson

The Colour Out of Space, also known as H. P. Lovecraft's The Colour Out of Space (Japanese: 異世界の色彩 ラヴクラフト傑作集), is a 2015 comic book by the Japanese writer and artist Gou Tanabe. Based on the horror short story of the same name by H. P. Lovecraft, it revolves around an alien color that has appeared near the fictional town of Arkham, Massachusetts. The comic is in black and white and part of a series of Lovecraft adaptations by Tanabe.

Dark Horse Comics published the book in English translation on 1 July 2025.
