= Hiroko Minami =

Japanese nurse

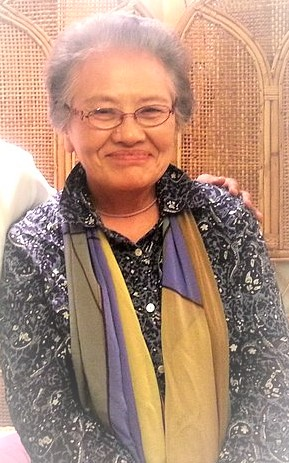
- Born: June 13, 1942 (age 84); Kobe
- Education: University of Kochi - Bachelor of nursing; Hebrew University of Jerusalem Braun School of Public Health and Community Medicine - Master Degree in Public Health; University of California, San Francisco - Doctoral of Nursing Science Degree
- Occupations: Nurse leader, Researcher
- Years active: 1988 -
- Known for: Japanese Nightingale
- Medical career
- Profession: Nurse leader, Researcher, Professor
- Field: Nursing
- Awards: Florence Nightingale Medal - 2011; Princess Srinagarindra Award Foundation - 2004

Hiroko Minami (南 裕子, Minami Hiroko; June 13, 1942 –), is a Japanese Nurse leader and educator. She has been working to advance nursing in Japan, including education, service, and research for more than 30 years.

== Early life ==
Minami was born in Kobe in 1942 and grew up in Kōchi Prefecture.

== Career ==
Minami started her career as a staff nurse and then moved to a faculty position. She was the first nurse appointed the president of an independent public college, the College of Nursing Art and Science, Hyogo. She was a member of several committees and councils in the Ministry of Health and the Ministry of Education where she developed health and nursing education policies. She was the 25th president of the International Council of Nurses from 2005 until 2009 and the World Health Organization Global Advisory Group on Nursing/Midwifery. She also served as the president of the Japanese Nursing Association from 1999 until 2005.
