= History of manga =

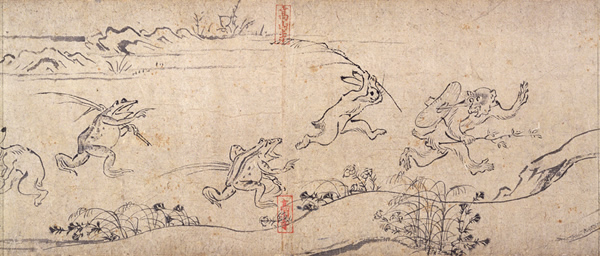
Chōjū-giga (12th century), traditionally attributed to a monk-artist Kakuyū (Toba Sōjo)

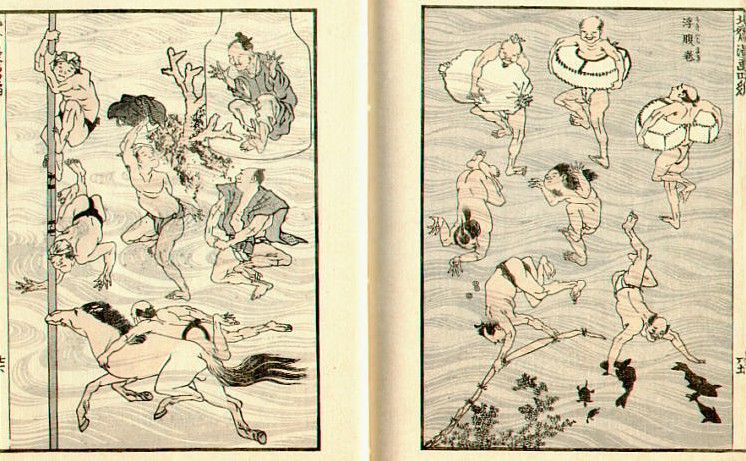
Image of bathers from the Hokusai manga

Modern manga, in the sense of narrative multi-panel cartoons made in Japan, originated from Western-style cartoons featured in late 19th century Japanese publications. The form of manga as speech-balloon based comics more specifically originated from translations of American comic strips in the 1920s; several early examples of such manga read left to right, with the longest running pre-1945 manga being the Japanese translation of the American comic strip Bringing Up Father. The term manga first came into use in the late 18th century, though it only started to refer to various forms of cartooning in the 1890s and did not become a common word until the 1910s.

Historians and writers on manga history have described two broad and complementary processes that shaped modern manga. While their views differ in the relative importance they attribute to the role of cultural and historical events following World War II versus the role of pre-war, Meiji, and pre-Meiji Japanese culture and art. One view, represented by other writers such as Frederik L. Schodt, Kinko Ito, and Adam L. Kern, stresses continuity of Japanese cultural and aesthetic traditions, including the latter three eras; the other view states that, during and after the occupation of Japan by the allies (1945–1952), manga was strongly shaped by the Americans' cultural influences, including comics brought to Japan by the GIs, and by images and themes from U.S. television, film, and cartoons (especially Disney). According to Sharon Kinsella, the booming Japanese publishing industry helped create a consumer-oriented society in which publishing giants like Kodansha could shape popular tastes. Manga reflects Japanese society, myths, beliefs rituals, traditions, and fantasies.

== Before World War II ==
Manga is said to originate from emakimono (scrolls), Chōjū-jinbutsu-giga, dating back to the 12th and 13th centuries. During the Edo period (1603–1867), another book of drawings, Toba Ehon, embedded the concept of manga. The word first came into common usage in the late 18th and early 19th centuries, with the publication of such works as Santō Kyōden's picture book Shiji no yukikai (1798), and Aikawa Minwa's Manga hyakujo (1814); this also includes the celebrated Hokusai Manga books (1814–1834), which contain assorted drawings from the sketchbooks of the famous ukiyo-e artist Hokusai (1760–1849). Kitazawa Rakuten (1876–1955) was the first artist to use the word manga in the modern sense. Another example is in the first half of the 19th century it is speculated to be Dehōdai mucharon (1822), with prints from the artist Hiroshige, who illustrated several books of this kind between 1820 and 1837.

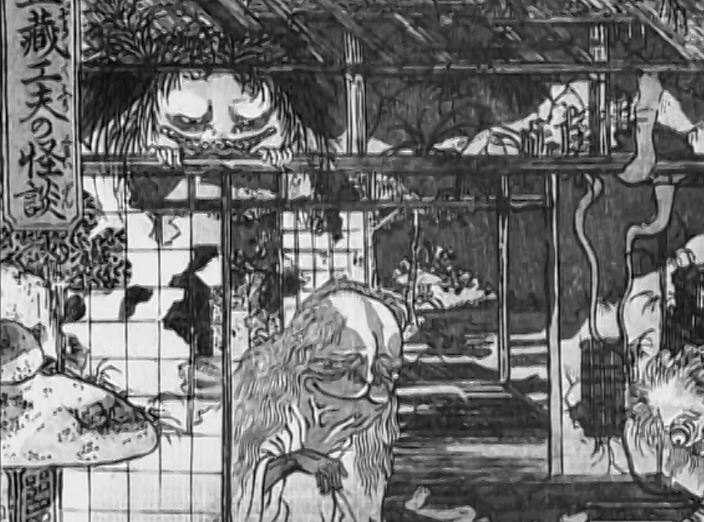
Japanese wood block illustration from 19th century

Writers stress the continuity of Japanese cultural and aesthetic traditions as central to the history of manga. They include Frederik L. Schodt, Kinko Ito, Adam L. Kern, and Eric Peter Nash. Schodt points to the existence in the 13th century of illustrated picture scrolls like Chōjū-jinbutsu-giga that told stories in sequential images with humor and wit. Schodt also stresses continuities of aesthetic style and vision between ukiyo-e, shunga woodblock prints, and modern manga (all three fulfill Eisner's criteria for sequential art). While there are disputes over whether Chōjū-jinbutsu-giga or Shigisan Engi Emaki was the first manga, both scrolls date back to the same time period. However, others like Isao Takahata, Studio Ghibli co-founder and director, contend there is no linkage between the scrolls and modern manga.

Schodt and Nash see a particularly significant role of kamishibai, a form of street theater where itinerant artists display pictures in a lightbox while narrating the story to audiences in the street. Professor Richard Torrance has pointed to similarities between modern manga and the Osaka popular novel, written between the 1890s and 1940s, and argues that the development of widespread literacy in Meiji and post-Meiji Japan helped create audiences for stories told in words and pictures. Ito also roots manga historically in aesthetic continuity with pre-Meiji art, but sees its post-WWII history as driven in part by consumer enthusiasm for the rich imagery and narrative of the newly developing manga tradition. She describes how this tradition has steadily produced new genres and markets, e.g., for girls' (shōjo) manga in the late 1960s and for ladies' comics (redisu) in the 1980s.

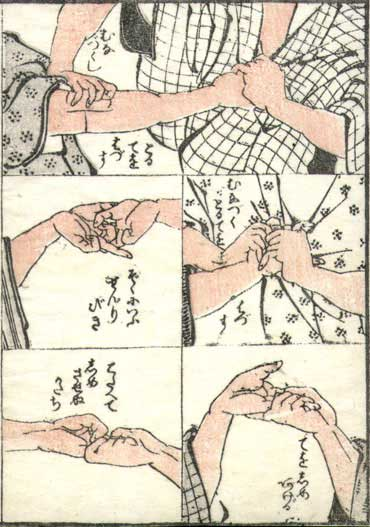
Hokusai Manga (early 19th century)

Even though Eastern comics are generally held separate from the evolution of Western comics, and Western comic art probably originated in 17th century Italy, Kern has suggested that kibyōshi, picture books from the late 18th century, may have been the world's first comic books. These graphic narratives share humorous, satirical, and romantic themes with modern manga. Although Kern does not believe that kibyōshi were a direct forerunner of manga, they believe the existence of kibyōshi nonetheless points to a Japanese willingness to mix words and pictures in a popular story-telling medium. The first recorded use of the term manga to mean "whimsical or impromptu pictures" comes from this tradition in 1798, which, as Kern points out, predates Hokusai's popular Hokusai Manga usage by several decades.

As illustrated magazines for Western expatriates introduced Western-style satirical cartoons to Japan in the late 19th century, new publications in both the Western and Eastern styles became popular. At the end of the 1890s, American-style newspaper comic supplements began to appear in Japan, as well as some American comic strips. 1900 saw the debut of Rakuten's Jiji Manga in the Jiji Shinpō newspaper—the first use of the word manga in its modern sense, and where, in 1902, he began the first modern Japanese comic strip. By the 1930s, comic strips were serialized in large-circulation monthly girls' and boys' magazines and collected into hardback volumes.

Similarly, writer Charles Shirō Inoue sees manga as a mixture of image and word-centered elements, each pre-dating the Allied occupation of Japan. In his view, Japanese image-centered, or "pictocentric," art ultimately derives from Japan's long history of engagement with Chinese graphic art; whereas word-centered, or "logocentric," art, like the novel, was stimulated by social and economic needs of Meiji and pre-war Japanese nationalism for a populace unified by a common written language. Both fuse in what Inoue sees as a symbiosis in manga.

The roots of the wide-eyed look commonly associated with manga date back to the illustrations of shōjo magazines published during the late 19th to early 20th centuries (for example, Shōjo Gahō). The most popular illustrators associated with this style at the time were Yumeji Takehisa and Jun'ichi Nakahara, who, influenced by his work as a doll creator, frequently drew female characters with big eyes in the early 20th century. This had a significant influence on early manga, particularly shōjo, evident in the work of influential manga artists such as Macoto Takahashi and Riyoko Ikeda.

However, other writers (for one, Takashi Murakami) have stressed events after WWII. Murakami sees Japan's surrender and the atomic bombing of Hiroshima and Nagasaki as having created long-lasting scars on the Japanese artistic psyche, which, in this view, lost its previously virile confidence in itself and sought solace in harmless and cute (kawaii) images. However, Takayumi Tatsumi sees a special role for a transpacific economic and cultural transnationalism that created a postmodern and shared international youth culture of cartooning, film, television, music, and related popular arts, which was, for Tatsumi, the crucible in which modern manga has developed, an example being Norakuro. Another writer who stresses post-war for manga and limites the span to sixty years is Schodt's.

For Murakami and Tatsumi, transnationalism (or globalization) refers specifically to the flow of cultural and subcultural material from one nation to another. In their usage, the term does not refer to international corporate expansion, neither to international tourism, nor to cross-border international personal friendships, but to ways in which artistic, aesthetic, and intellectual traditions influence each other across national boundaries. An example of cultural transnationalism is the creation of Star Wars films in the US, their transformation into manga by Japanese artists, and the marketing of Star Wars manga to the US. Another example is the transfer of hip-hop culture from the US to Japan. Professor Wendy Siuyi Wong also sees a major role for transnationalism in the recent history of manga.

Thus, these scholars see the history of manga as involving historical continuities and discontinuities between the aesthetic and cultural past as it interacts with post-WWII innovation and transnationalism.

== After World War II ==
Japanese artists subsequently gave life to their own style during the occupation (1945–1952) and post-occupation years (1952–1972), when a previously militarist and ultranationalist Japan was rebuilding its political and economic infrastructure. (Note: This section draws primarily on the work of Frederik Schodt (1986, 1996, 2007) and of Paul Gravett (2004). Time-lines for manga history are available in Mechademia, Gravett, and in articles by Go Tchiei 1998.) Although Allied occupation censorship policies specifically prohibited art and writing that glorified war and Japanese militarism, those policies did not prevent the publication of other kinds of material, including manga. Furthermore, the 1947 Japanese Constitution (Article 21) prohibited all forms of censorship, which led to the growth of artistic creativity. In the forefront of this period are two manga series and characters that influenced much of the future history of manga: Osamu Tezuka's Mighty Atom (Astro Boy in the United States; begun in April 1951) and Machiko Hasegawa's Sazae-san (begun in April 1946).

Astro Boy was both a superpowered robot and a naive little boy. Tezuka never explained why Astro Boy had such a highly developed social conscience, nor what kind of robot programming could make him so deeply affiliative. Both qualities seem innate to Astro Boy and represent a Japanese sociality and community-oriented masculinity, differing very much from the Emperor-worship and militaristic obedience enforced during the previous period of Japanese imperialism. Astro Boy quickly became (and remains) immensely popular in Japan and elsewhere as an icon and hero of a new world of peace and the renunciation of war, as seen in Article 9 of the newly created Japanese constitution. Similar themes occur in Tezuka's New World and Metropolis.

By contrast, Sazae-san (meaning "Ms. Sazae") was commenced in 1946 by Hasegawa, a young artist who made her heroine a stand-in for millions of Japanese citizens, especially women, rendered homeless by the war. Sazae does not face an easy or simple life, but, similar to Astro Boy, she is highly affiliative and is deeply involved with her immediate and extended family. She is also a very strong character, in striking contrast to the officially sanctioned Neo-Confucianist principles of feminine meekness and obedience to the "good wife, wise mother" (良妻賢母, ryōsai kenbo) ideal taught by the previous military regime. Sazae faces the world with cheerful resilience, what psychologist Hayao Kawai calls a "woman of endurance." Sazae-san sold more than 62 million copies over the next half-century.

Tezuka and Hasegawa were both stylistic innovators. In Tezuka's "cinematographic" technique, the panels are like a motion picture that reveals details of action, bordering on slow motion as well as rapid zooms from distance to close-up shots. More critically, he synchronised the placement of the panel with the reader's viewing speed to simulate moving pictures; this kind of visual dynamism was widely adopted by later manga artists. In manga production as well as in film production, it gave way to the school of thought that the person who decides the allocation of panels (komawari) is credited as the author, while most drawings are done by assistants. Hasagawa's focus on daily life and women's experiences also came to characterize later shōjo manga.

In the 1950s and 1960s, increasingly larger audiences for manga emerged in Japan with the solidification of its two main marketing genres: shōnen manga aimed at boys, and shōjo manga aimed at girls. Until 1969, shōjo manga was primarily drawn by adult men for young female readers.

Two very popular and influential male-authored manga for girls from this period were Tezuka's 1953-1956 Ribon no Kishi (Princess Knight) and Mitsuteru Yokoyama's 1966 Mahōtsukai Sarī (Sally the Witch). Ribon no Kishi dealt with the adventures of Princess Sapphire of a fantasy kingdom who had been born with male and female souls, and whose sword-swinging battles and romances blurred the boundaries of otherwise rigid gender roles. Sarī, the pre-teen princess heroine of Mahōtsukai Sarī, (Note: Sarii is the Japanese spelling and pronunciation of the English-language name "Sally". The word mahōtsukai literally means "magic operator", someone who can use and control magic. It does not mean "witch" or "magical girl" (which is mahō shōjo in Japanese), because tsukai is not a gendered word in Japanese. This use of an English-language name with a Japanese descriptive word is an example of transnationalism in Tatsumi's sense.) came from her home in the magical lands to live on Earth, go to school, and perform a variety of magical good deeds for her friends and schoolmates. Yokoyama was influenced by the US TV sitcom Bewitched, but unlike Samantha (the main character of Bewitched, a married woman with her own daughter), Sarī is a pre-teenager who faces the problems of growing up and mastering the responsibilities of forthcoming adulthood. Sally the Witch helped create the mahō shōjo, or "magical girl," subgenre of manga (which became popular in the early 21st century). Both series were, and still are, very popular.

=== Shōjo manga ===
In 1969, a variety of female manga artists, later called the Year 24 Group (also known as Magnificent 24s), made their shōjo, meaning/for girl, manga debut ("year 24" comes from the year Shōwa 24 on the Japanese calendar, or 1949 on the Gregorian calendar, when some of these artists were born). The group included Hagio Moto, Riyoko Ikeda, Yumiko Ōshima, Keiko Takemiya, and Ryoko Yamagishi, which marked the first major entry of female artists into manga. Thereafter, shōjo manga would be drawn primarily by female artists for an audience of girls and young women. In 1971, Ikeda began her immensely popular shōjo manga Berusaiyu no Bara (The Rose of Versailles), the story of Oscar François de Jarjayes, a cross-dressing woman who was a captain in Marie Antoinette's Palace Guards in pre-Revolutionary France. At the end of the series (which originally ran from 1972 to 1973), Oscar dies as a revolutionary leading a charge of her troops against the Bastille. Likewise, Moto's work challenged Japan's Neo-Confucianist limits on women's roles and activities. Her 1975 shōjo science fiction story, They Were Eleven, tells the story of a young female cadet in a future space academy.

These women also innovated stylistic choices of the art form. In its focus on the heroine's inner experiences and feelings, shōjo manga are "picture poems" with delicate and complex designs that often eliminate panel borders completely to create prolonged, non-narrative extensions of time. The group's contributions in their stories – strong and independent female characters, intense emotionality, and complex design – remain characteristic of shōjo manga to the present day.

=== Shōjo manga and Ladies' Comics from 1975 to today ===
In the following decades (1975–present), shōjo manga developed stylistically while simultaneously evolving overlapping subgenres. Major subgenres have included romance, superheroines, and "Ladies Comics" (in Japanese, redisu (レディース), redikomi (レディコミ), and josei (女性 じょせい)), of which boundaries are sometimes indistinguishable from each other and from shōnen manga. Shõjo and shõnen manga are often contrasted with their themes. Strength and action represent shõnen, while Shõjo is seen as more interior and about human relationships. Shõjo though is not always like this, and can break beyond this interior feeling.

In modern shōjo manga romance, love is a major theme set into emotionally intense narratives of self-realization. Japanese manga/anime critic Eri Izawa defines romance as symbolizing "the emotional, the grand, the epic; the taste of heroism, fantastic adventure, and the melancholy; passionate love, personal struggle, and eternal longing" set into imaginative, individualistic, and passionate narrative frameworks. These romances are sometimes long narratives that can distinguish between false and true love, coping with sexual intercourse, and growing up in an ambivalent world; these themes are inherited by subsequent animated versions of the story. These "coming of age," or Bildungsroman, themes occur in both shōjo and shōnen manga. (Note: In German, Bildung means "education" and Roman means "novel," hence a Bildungsroman is a novel about the education of the protagonist in "the ways of the world.")

In the Bildungsroman, the protagonist must deal with adversity and conflict. Examples of romantic conflict in shōjo manga are common, as exhibited in Miwa Ueda's Peach Girl, and Fuyumi Soryo's Mars. Examples for older readers include Moyoco Anno's Happy Mania, Yayoi Ogawa's Tramps Like Us, and Ai Yazawa's Nana. In another shōjo manga Bildungsroman narrative device, the young heroine is transported to an alien place or time where she meets strangers and must survive on her own (including Moto's They Were Eleven, Kyoko Hikawa's From Far Away, Yû Watase's Fushigi Yûgi: The Mysterious Play, and Be-Papas's World of the S&M (The World Exists For Me)).

Another narrative device involves meeting unusual or strange people and beings; for example, Natsuki Takaya's Fruits Basket—one of the most popular shōjo manga in the United States—whose orphaned heroine, Tohru must survive living in the woods in a house filled with people who can transform into the animals of the Chinese zodiac. This device is also used in Harako Iida's Crescent Moon, wherein heroine Mahiru meets a group of supernatural beings, and discovers that she too has a supernatural ancestry when she and a young tengu demon fall in love.

With superheroines, shōjo manga continued to break away from the Neo-Confucianist norms of female meekness and obedience. Naoko Takeuchi's Sailor Moon (Bishōjo Senshi Sēramūn: "Pretty Guardian Sailor Moon") — one of the best-selling shōjo manga series of all time — is a sustained, 18-volume narrative about a group of young heroines simultaneously heroic and introspective, active and emotional, as well as dutiful and ambitious. The combination proved extremely successful, and Sailor Moon became internationally popular in both manga and anime formats. Another example is CLAMP's Magic Knight Rayearth, whose three young heroines - Hikaru, Umi, and Fuu - are magically transported to the world of Cefiro to become armed magical warriors and defend it from internal and external enemies.

The superheroine subgenre also extensively developed the notion of teams (sentai) of girls working together, which includes the "Sailor Senshi" in Sailor Moon, the Magic Knights in Magic Knight Rayearth, and the Mew Mew girls from Mia Ikumi's Tokyo Mew Mew. Presently, the superheroine narrative template has been widely used and parodied within the shōjo manga tradition (e.g., Nao Yazawa's Wedding Peach and Hyper Rune by Tamayo Akiyama), as well as outside it, (e.g., in bishōjo comedies like Broccoli's Galaxy Angel).

Starting in the mid-1980s, as women who read shōjo manga as teenagers matured, the artists elaborated subgenres to fit their audience. This "Ladies' Comics," or josei, subgenre has dealt with themes of young adulthood: jobs, the emotions and problems of sexual intercourse, and friendships or love among women.

Josei (also called Redisu) manga retains many of the narrative stylistics of shōjo manga, with the main difference being that it is created by (and for) adult women. Redisu manga and art have often been (though not always) sexually explicit, but the content has characteristically been set into thematic narratives of pleasure and erotic arousal combined with emotional risk. Examples include Ryō Ramiya's Luminous Girls, Masako Watanabe's Kinpeibai, and the work of Shungicu Uchida. One subgenre of redisu manga deals with emotional and sexual relationships among women (yuri), shown in work by Erica Sakurazawa, Ebine Yamaji, and Chiho Saito. Other subgenres of redisu manga have also developed, e.g., fashion (oshare) manga, like Ai Yazawa's Paradise Kiss and horror-vampire-gothic manga, like Matsuri Hino's Vampire Knight, Kaori Yuki's Cain Saga, and Mitsukazu Mihara's DOLL, which interact with street fashions, costume play ("cosplay"), J-Pop music, and goth subcultures in various ways.

=== Shōnen, seinen, and seijin manga ===
Manga for male readers can be characterized in different ways. One is by the age of its intended audience: boys up to 18 years old (shōnen manga) and young men between the ages of 18 and 30 years old (seinen manga). Another approach is by its content, an example being action-adventure that often involves male heroes, slapstick humor, themes of honor, and sometimes explicit sex. (Note: In another system of classification, shōnen, seinen, and seijin manga—indeed, all genres of manga—are defined by the intended audience or demographic of the magazine where the manga originally appeared, regardless of content of the specific manga. This magazine-of-origin system is used by the English-language Wikipedia in its Template:Infobox animanga when assigning demographic labels to manga. For a list of magazine demographics, see http://users.skynet.be/mangaguide/magazines.html, but note that that website does not use magazine audience or demographic for classifying manga, nor is this approach discussed by either Thompson (2007) or Brenner (2007).) Japanese uses different kanji for two closely allied meanings of "seinen"—青年 for "youth, young man"; the second referring to pornographic manga aimed at grown men — 成年 for "adult, majority" — also called seijin ("adult," 成人) manga. (Note: The French Wikipedia manga article uses the terms seinen and seijin to denote manga for adult men. Accessed 2007-12-28.) Shōnen, seinen, and seijin manga share a number of features in common. Boys and young men were among the earliest readers of manga after World War II. From the 1950s on, shōnen manga focused on topics thought to interest the archetypical boy: sci-tech subjects like robots and space travel, and heroic action-adventure. Early shōnen and seinen manga narratives often portrayed challenges to the protagonist's abilities, skills, and maturity; they stressed self-perfection, austere self-discipline, sacrifice in the cause of duty, and honorable service to society, community, family, and friends.

The late 1970s through the 1980s decade featured a pioneering movement called the New Wave that challenged the stereotypes associated with older Gekiga manga, the Disney-influenced style of Osamu Tezuka, and old art styles. It prized realism, adult rebellion, and psychological themes often found in seinen manga, of which many such themes were portrayed in science fiction and fantasy manga. The new stars of this movement were Katsuhiro Otomo, Fumiko Takano, and Hisaichi Ishii.

Manga with solitary costumed superheroes, like Superman, Batman, and Spider-Man, did not become popular as a shōnen genre. An exception is Kia Asamiya's Batman: Child of Dreams, released in Japan by Kodansha in 2000, and in the US by DC Comics in 2003. However, lone antiheroes occur in Takao Saito's Golgo 13, and Kazuo Koike and Goseki Kojima's Lone Wolf and Cub. Golgo 13 tells the story of an assassin, named "Golgo 13" among other aliases, who puts his skills to the service of world peace and other social goals; and Ogami Itto, the swordsman-hero of Lone Wolf and Cub, is a widower caring for his son Daigoro while he seeks vengeance against his wife's murderers. However, Golgo and Itto remain mortal men throughout their stories, and neither of them ever displays superpowers. Instead, these stories "journey into the hearts and minds of men" by remaining on the plane of human psychology and motivation.

Many shōnen manga have science fiction and technology elements. Early examples in the robot subgenre include Tezuka's Astro Boy, and Fujiko Fujio's 1969 Doraemon about a robot cat and the boy he lives with, which was aimed at younger boys. The robot theme evolved extensively, from Yokoyama's 1956 Tetsujin 28-gō to more complex stories where the protagonist must not only defeat enemies, but learn to master themselves and cooperate with the mecha they control. This new archetype was put on display in Neon Genesis Evangelion by Yoshiyuki Sadamoto, where Shinji struggles against the enemy and his father; it was repeated in The Vision of Escaflowne by Katsu Aki, where Van not only makes war against Dornkirk's empire, but must deal with his complex feelings for Hitomi, the heroine.

Sports themes are popular in manga aimed at male readers. These stories stress self-discipline, depicting not only the excitement of sports competition but also the character traits the hero needs to transcend his limitations and triumph. Examples include boxing (Tetsuya Chiba's 1968-1973 Tomorrow's Joe and Rumiko Takahashi's 1987 One-Pound Gospel) and basketball (Takehiko Inoue’s 1990 Slam Dunk).

Supernatural settings have been a source of action-adventure plots in shōnen (and some shōjo manga), in which the hero must master challenges. Sometimes the protagonist fails, as in Tsugumi Ohba and Takeshi Obata's Death Note, where Light Yagami receives a notebook from a Death God (shinigami) that kills anyone whose name is written in it. In shōjo manga, there is Hakase Mizuki's The Demon Ororon, whose protagonist abandons his demonic kingship of Hell to live (and die) on Earth. Sometimes the protagonist themselves are supernatural, like the seinen Kouta Hirano's Hellsing; it tells of vampire hero Alucard who battles reborn Nazis hellbent on conquering England. However, the hero may also be (or was) human, battling an ever-escalating series of supernatural enemies (Hiromu Arakawa's Fullmetal Alchemist, Nobuyuki Anzai's Flame of Recca, and Tite Kubo's Bleach).

Military action-adventure stories set in the modern world (for example, about WWII) remained under suspicion of glorifying Japan's Imperial history and have not become a significant part of the shōnen manga repertoire. Nonetheless, stories about fantasy or historical military adventure were not stigmatized, and manga about heroic warriors and martial artists have been extremely popular. Some are serious dramas, like Sanpei Shirato's The Legend of Kamui and Nobuhiro Watsuki's Rurouni Kenshin, while others contain strongly humorous elements, like Akira Toriyama's Dragon Ball.

Although stories about modern war and its weapons do exist, they often deal with more of the psychological and moral problems of war versus with sheer shoot-'em-up adventure. Examples include Katsuhiro Otomo's Akira (manga) which is considered to have popularized the manga medium worldwide with its anime film in 1988, and Seiho Takizawa's Who Fighter, an adaptation of Joseph Conrad's Heart of Darkness that tells of a renegade Japanese colonel set in WWII Burma; Kaiji Kawaguchi's The Silent Service, about a Japanese nuclear submarine; and the seinen Motofumi Kobayashi's Cat Shit One (released as Apocalypse Meow in the U.S.) about the Vietnam War told in talking animal format. Other battle and fight-oriented manga sometimes focus on criminal and espionage conspiracies to be overcome by the protagonist, such as in Crying Freeman by Kazuo Koike and Ryoichi Ikegami, City Hunter by Tsukasa Hojo, and the shōjo series From Eroica with Love by Yasuko Aoike, a long-running crime-espionage story combining adventure, action, and humor (and another example of how these themes occur across demographics).

For manga critics Koji Aihara and Kentaro Takekuma, such battle stories endlessly repeat the same mindless themes of violence, which they sardonically label the "Shonen Manga Plot Shish Kebob", where fights follow fights like meat skewered on a stick. Other commentators suggest that fight sequences and violence in comics serve as a social outlet for otherwise dangerous impulses. Shōnen manga and its extreme warriorship have been parodied in, for example, Mine Yoshizaki's screwball comedy Sgt. Frog (named Keroro Gunso in Japan), about a platoon of slacker alien frogs who invade the Earth and end up free-loading off the Hinata family in Tokyo.

==== Sex and women's roles in manga for males ====
In early shōnen manga, males played all the major roles, with females having only auxiliary places as sisters, mothers, and occasionally girlfriends. Of the nine cyborgs in Shotaro Ishinomori's 1964 Cyborg 009, only one is female, and she soon vanishes from the action. Some recent shōnen manga virtually omit women, e.g., the martial arts story Baki the Grappler by Keisuke Itagaki and the supernatural fantasy Sand Land by Akira Toriyama. However, by the 1980s, girls and women began to play increasingly important roles in shōnen; for example, the main character in Toriyama's Dr. Slump (1980) is the mischievous and powerful girl robot Arale Norimaki.

The role of girls and women in manga for male readers has evolved considerably since Arale. One class is the "beautiful girl" (bishōjo). (Note: For multiple meanings of bishōjo, see Perper & Cornog (2002), pp. 60–63.) Sometimes the bishōjo is unattainable, but she is generally an object of the hero's emotional and sexual interest; an example being Belldandy from Oh My Goddess! by Kōsuke Fujishima, or Shaorin from Mamotte Shugogetten by Minene Sakurano. In other stories, the hero is surrounded by such girls and women, as in Negima! by Ken Akamatsu and Hanaukyo Maid Team by Morishige. The male protagonist does not always succeed in forming a relationship with the bishōjo; for example, when Bright Honda and Aimi Komori fail to bond in Shadow Lady by Masakazu Katsura. In some cases, a successful couple's sexual activities are depicted or implied, like in Outlanders by Johji Manabe. Other stories feature an initially naive hero subsequently learning how to deal and live with women emotionally and sexually, like Yota in Video Girl Ai by Masakazu Katsura, Densha Otoko ("Train Man") in the seinen Densha Otoko by Hidenori Hara, and Makoto in Futari Ecchi by Katsu Aki. In erotic manga (seijin manga), often called hentai manga in the US, a sexual relationship is taken for granted and depicted explicitly, as in work by Toshiki Yui. Other examples are Were-Slut by Jiro Chiba and Slut Girl by Isutoshi. The result is various depictions of boys and men, from naive to very sexually experienced.

Heavily armed female warriors (sentō bishōjo) represent another class of girls and women in manga for male readers. (Note: For the sentō bishōjo, translated as "battling beauty," see Kotani, Mari. 2006. "Metamorphosis of the Japanese girl: The girl, the hyper-girl, and the battling beauty." Mechademia: An Annual Forum for Anime, Manga, and the Fan Arts, 1:162–170. See also William O. Gardner. 2003. Attack of the Phallic Girls: Review of Saitô Tamaki. Sentō bishōjo no seishin bunseki (Fighting Beauties: A Psychoanalysis). Tokyo: Ôta Shuppan, 2000. at https://www.depauw.edu/sfs/review_essays/gardner88.htm. Accessed 2007-12-28.) Some sentō bishōjo are battle cyborgs, like Alita from Battle Angel Alita by Yukito Kishiro, Motoko Kusanagi from Masamune Shirow's Ghost in the Shell, and Chise from Shin Takahashi's Saikano. Others are human, like Attim M-Zak from Hiroyuki Utatane's Seraphic Feather, Johji Manabe's Karula Olzen from Drakuun, and Alita Forland (Falis) from Sekihiko Inui's Murder Princess.

As of 2013, national censorship laws and local ordinances remain in Japan. The public response to the publication of manga with sexual content or the depiction of nudity has been mixed. Series have an audience and sell well, but their publication also encounters opposition. In the early 1990s, the opposition resulted in the creation of Harmful manga lists and a shift in the publishing industry. By this time, large publishers had created a general manga demand. Still, the result is that they were also susceptible to public opinion in their markets. Faced with criticism from certain segments of the population and under pressure from industry groups to self-regulate, major publishing houses discontinued series, such as Angel and 1+2=Paradise; smaller publication companies, not as susceptible to these forces, were able to fill the void.

With the relaxation of censorship in Japan after the early 1990s, various forms of graphically drawn sexual content appeared in manga intended for male readers that correspondingly occurred in English translations. These depictions ranged from partial to total nudity through implied and explicit sexual intercourse through sadomasochism (SM), incest, rape, and sometimes zoophilia (bestiality). In some cases, rape and lust-murder themes came to the forefront, as in Urotsukidōji by Toshio Maeda and Blue Catalyst (1994) by Kei Taniguchi. However, these extreme elements are not commonplace in manga.

=== Gekiga ===
Gekiga literally translates to "dramatic pictures" and refers to a form of aesthetic realism in manga. Gekiga-style storytelling tends to be emotionally dark, adult-oriented, and sometimes deeply violent, focusing on the day-in, day-out realities of life, and often drawn in gritty fashion. The artform arose in the late 1950s into the 1960s, partly from left-wing student and working class political activism, and partly from the aesthetic dissatisfaction of young manga artists like Yoshihiro Tatsumi with existing manga. One example is Sanpei Shirato's Chronicles of a Ninja's Military Accomplishments (Ninja Bugeichō) (1959–1962), the story of Kagemaru, the leader of a peasant rebellion in the 16th century, which dealt directly with oppression and class struggle. Another example is Hiroshi Hirata's Satsuma Gishiden, about uprisings against the Tokugawa shogunate.

Gekiga can be seen as the Japanese equivalent of the graphic novel culture occurring in Europe (Hugo Pratt, Didier Comès, and Jacques Tardi), in the U.S. (Will Eisner's A Contract with God, Art Spiegelman's Maus, and Robert Crumb's autobiographical works) and in South America (Alberto Breccia and Héctor Germán Oesterheld). For that reason, typical graphic novel publishers, such as Drawn & Quarterly and Fantagraphics, started publishing many English versions of Japanese gekiga highlights in recent years.

As the social protest of these early years waned, gekiga shifted in meaning towards socially conscious, mature drama and the avant-garde. Examples include Koike and Kojima's Lone Wolf and Cub, and Osamu Tezuka's 1976 manga MW, a bitter story of the aftermath of the storage and possibly deliberate release of poison gas by the U.S. armed forces based in Okinawa years after World War II. Gekiga and the social consciousness it embodies remain alive in modern-day manga. An example is Ikebukuro West Gate Park (2001) by Ira Ishida and Sena Aritō, a story of street thugs, rape, and vengeance set on the social margins of the wealthy Ikebukuro district of Tokyo.

=== Books on the History of Manga ===
Some books that aim to further the understand/history of manga are as follows: Drawing New Color Lines by Monica Chiu, Dreamland Japan by Frederick L. Schodt, God of Comics by Natsu Onoda Power, Japanese Visual Culture by Mark W. MacWilliams, Manga by Paul Gravett, Manga! Manga! by Frederik L. Schodt; Osamu Tezuka (Introduction by), One Thousand Years of Manga by Brigitte Koyama-Richard, Passionate Friendship: The Aesthetics of Girls' Culture in Japan by Deborah M. Shamoon, and Traditional Monster Imagery in Manga, Anime and Japanese Cinema by Zília Papp.

== See also ==
- History of comics
- History of anime
