= Beautiful People (manga) =

Japanese manga volume

- The English-language cover as released by Tokyopop in North America on February 7, 2006. Art by Mitsukazu Mihara.

ビューティフルピープル
- Genre: Urban fantasy
- Manga
- Written by: Mitsukazu Mihara
- Published by: Shodensha
- English publisher: NA: Tokyopop
- Published: October 20, 2001
- Volumes: 1

Beautiful People (Japanese: ビューティフルピープル, Hepburn: Byūtifuru Pīpuru) is a josei manga by Mitsukazu Mihara. It is a collection of six short stories and was published by Shodensha on October 20, 2001.

== Plot ==
Beautiful People consists of six unrelated short stories, a format Mitsukazu Mihara frequently uses for her narrative.

In "Princess White Snow" (雪白姫), a man finds an abandoned snow maiden. He brings her back to his apartment, but despite his efforts to keep her alive she dissolves into water after the air conditioning is turned off. He uses the water to help grow a flower, something she had always wanted.

"World's End" (WORLD´S END) focuses on the two survivors of a biochemical weapon: a spoiled lesbian and a male homosexual. Both live together but most of the time are annoyed by each other's presence. At one point the tension rises to unbearable levels for both and she forces him to leave, only to later realize that she needs him.

The third story, "Electric Angel" (アンチテレフォニカ), features a bullied teenage boy who discovers that his online friend might be his mother, who left him with his father when he was young.

In "The Lady Stalker" (ストーカーの女), a woman who believes she is stalked by a co-worker is later revealed to be delusional since the co-worker is in fact stalking her friend.

The protagonist of "Beautiful People" (ビューティフルピープル) has plastic surgery done in the hope that she would become beautiful and loved, but after meeting a girl stitched from corpses, realizes that it was the girl who was truly beautiful since she gave love.

The last story, "Blue Sky" (空気の中を抜ける空), focuses on the lifelong relationship between an abandoned girl and a vampire.

== Style and themes ==
Reviewers have identified multiple themes and literary elements in the manga. Mania Entertainment's Sakura Eries wrote that while the collection lacked "an overt theme", the effect of a person on another is the focus of the six stories. IGN's A.E. Sparrow considered the theme of Beautiful People to be the meaning of beauty, and Mihara argues that beauty is found in one's character. Mikhail Koulikov of Anime News Network classified "Princess White Snow", "Blue Sky", and "beautiful people" as urban fantasy. Eries categorized "World's End" as post-apocalyptic fiction, while Koulikov considered it a modernized version of "Time Enough at Last", a Twilight Zone episode. Koulikov wrote that "Electric Angel" and "The Lady Stalker" examines a darker side of the Japanese society not typically presented in manga.

== Release ==
Written and illustrated by Mitsukazu Mihara, the six short stories of Beautiful People were published in a tankōbon volume by Shodensha on October 20, 2001.

Tokyopop licensed the manga for an English-language release in North America along with four of her other works: The Embalmer, IC in a Sunflower, Haunted House and R.I.P.: Requiem in Phonybrian. Translated by Haruko Furukawa and adapted for an English-language audience by Nathan Johnson, Beautiful People was published it on February 7, 2006 (ISBN 978-1598162431). However, Tokyopop's North American branch stopped publishing on May 31, 2011.

== Reception ==
Beautiful People was positively received by English-language reviewers and readers. It reached the 98th place in the list of 100 best-selling graphic novels for January 2006 with an estimated 823 copies sold. Reviewers praised Mihara's short stories and the ideas examined. Koulikov described it as "one of the finest examples of literary manga currently available in English." Sparrow wrote that some of the stories would have a lasting appeal, and ranked it 4th in the list of the top ten manga of 2006. Eries enjoyed the design of the English-language cover, and recommended that high school students read it.

== Bibliography ==
- Mihara, Mitsukazu (2006). Beautiful People. Los Angeles: Tokyopop. ISBN 978-1-59816-243-1.
