= IC in a Sunflower =

Japanese manga series by Mitsukazu Mihara

- The English-language cover as published by Tokyopop (2007)

集積回路のヒマワリ (Shūsekikairo no Himawari)
- Genre: Drama, Science fiction
- Manga
- Written by: Mitsukazu Mihara
- Published by: Shodensha
- English publisher: NA: Tokyopop (former); UK: Tokyopop
- Magazine: Feel Young
- Original run: 1994 – 1997
- Volumes: 1

IC in a Sunflower (Japanese: 集積回路のヒマワリ, Hepburn: Shūsekikairo no Himawari) is a science fiction josei (targeted towards women) manga written and illustrated by Mitsukazu Mihara. It is a collection of seven, unrelated short stories which appeared in the Japanese manga magazine Feel Young from 1994 to 1997. The stories were then collected into a bound volume in Japan by Shodensha on October 18, 1997. Tokyopop licensed IC in a Sunflower for an English-language release in North America, and published it on January 2, 2007. IC in a Sunflower was positively received by English-language critics and readers. Reviewers identified various themes and literary elements in the collection, and generally enjoyed the short stories and art.

The seven short stories consist of Mihara's 1994 debut "Keep Those Condoms Away From Our Kids" (ゴムのいらない子供たち, "Gomu no Iranai Kodomo-tachi"), set in a future in which an AIDS vaccine destroyed the desire for sex; "The Iron Maiden" (リッサの鉄の柩), which focuses on a young woman haunted by her childhood sexual abuse; "The Sunflower Quality Of An Integrated Circuit" (集積回路のヒマワリ), which deals with the events surrounding a couple and their robotic housekeeper; "The Other Side Of The Rose Wire" (バラ鉄線のむこう側), which centers on a boy in love with a girl caring for her elderly father; "Fish Out Of Water" (籠の魚), which revolves around a captured mermaid; "Mister Mineral" (鉱物君), which features a disturbed college student; and "Alive" (あなたは生きている), which is set in a future where human cloning is practiced.

== Plot ==
IC in a Sunflower consists of seven short stories, a format that Mitsukazu Mihara frequently uses for her narrative. The stories are unrelated to each other, each featuring a different protagonist. The stories of IC in a Sunflower sometimes incorporate a twist ending.

"Keep Those Condoms Away From Our Kids" (ゴムのいらない子供たち, "Gomu no Iranai Kodomo-tachi") revolves around a future in which teenagers do not have a desire for sex, as a result of an AIDS vaccine. The story focuses on Irori, who is taught about sex in school and encouraged by his parents, but ultimately neither understands nor has a desire for sex.

"The Iron Maiden" (リッサの鉄の柩) focuses on a woman who struggles to create a happy life for herself despite the childhood sexual abuse done to her by her older brother. In her backstory, her parents refused to believe her as a child about her brother's abuse towards her, and upset, she bites her doll and develops a compulsive habit of biting. Later, as an adult, she settles down with a husband and child, but after discovering her battered doll which triggers memories of her unhappy childhood, she bites her child.

"The Sunflower Quality Of An Integrated Circuit" (集積回路のヒマワリ) centers on Vanilla, an android who keeps house for an old man married to a younger, unfaithful woman. The man treats Vanilla well, seeing her as a daughter, and the two have tea in the garden; his wife, in contrast, abuses her and allows her lover to do the same. After the old man reveals his plans for divorce, his wife murders him and orders Vanilla to bury the remains. Vanilla obeys, although she recognizes that the remains were of the old man. The story ends with Vanilla in the garden, keeping her promise to the man by having tea when the sunflowers bloom.

In "The Other Side Of The Rose Wire" (バラ鉄線のむこう側), a boy falls in love from afar with a girl taking care of her elderly father. After she fails to appear with her father one day, he finds her dressed in mourning clothes with a smile on her face and burning the basket she kept with her.

"Fish Out Of Water" (籠の魚) focuses on a captured mermaid and her refusal to speak. Her captor attempts to pull her out of the bathtub where she had been living, and she remembers that she was a girl whose mother had tried to drown her and herself in a lake years ago. Her mother died, but she survived and imagined herself as a mermaid. She then wakes up from her delusion, finding herself in a hospital instead of a bathtub, and can begin to recover.

"Mister Mineral" (鉱物君) revolves around a college student, who collects rocks and is tormented by his memories of dissecting a frog. After learning that his girlfriend is pregnant, he becomes upset and tosses her into a busy highway.

Set in a future where human cloning is practiced, "Alive" (あなたは生きている) focuses on Tou, a clone sent to live in an orphanage of humans as part of an assignment. There, he meets a cheerful girl named Riika and after some time, she is taken to be killed for her organs. It is then revealed that Tou only thought he was a clone.

== Style and themes ==
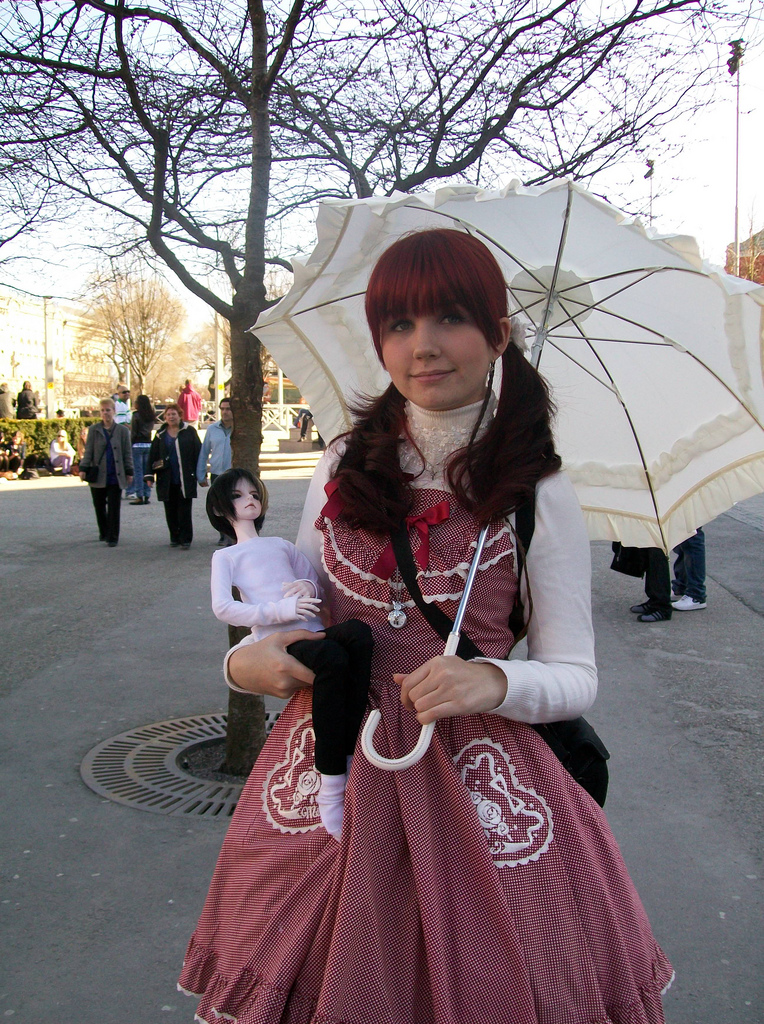
Mihara frequently uses character designs incorporating Lolita fashion (pictured).

In IC in a Sunflower and all her works, Mihara uses character designs incorporating Lolita fashion—a clothing style influenced by the Rococo style and the Victorian and Edwardian eras. She explained that that particular style conveys the duality of her characters: "It's about showing the delicate balance of 'delicate, yet strong,' or 'selfish and wild, yet lustful.'" Mihara has been involved with the shaping of the Gothic Lolita style—a subset of the Lolita fashion which incorporates dark colors—through her artwork; she illustrated the first eight covers of the fashion magazine-book Gothic & Lolita Bible and later returned to illustrating the covers with the twenty-seventh volume in fall 2007.

Reviewers have identified multiple themes and literary elements in the manga. According to Mania Entertainment's Nadia Oxford, Mihara uses minimal dialogue and narrative, instead conveying emotion through the behavior of the characters. IGN's A.E. Sparrow stated that the theme of the stories was the meaning of humanity, while Oxford wrote that the manga contains "themes of dystopian society and the fragile nature of the human mind." Sparrow thought that mental instability figures prominently in the stories. According to him, "Keep Those Condoms Away From Our Kids" deals with "the nature of sex," while Oxford believed that the story raises the question of the declining birth rate of Japan and other developed countries. Jason Thompson, author of Manga: The Complete Guide, considered "The Sunflower Quality of an Integrated Circuit" to have elements from film noir. By featuring a mute mermaid in "Fish Out Of Water", Mihara makes an implicit reference to the fairytale "The Little Mermaid", according to Oxford. The treatment of the elderly, children, or the unborn is the focus of some of the stories, according to Sparrow. Sparrow and Dan Grendall of Ain't It Cool News speculated that "Alive" focuses on the meaning of living.

== Release ==
Written and illustrated by Mitsukazu Mihara, the seven short stories of IC in a Sunflower appeared in the Japanese manga magazine Feel Young from 1994 to 1997; Mihara made her debut as a manga artist with "Keep Those Condoms Away From Our Kids" in 1994, which won a contest in Feel Young. The short stories were published by Shodensha in a bound volume, (ISBN 4396761716), in Japan on October 18, 1997. For her stories, she generally draws inspiration from real-life problems in society or unhappy times in her own life.

Tokyopop licensed IC in a Sunflower for an English-language release in North America and the United Kingdom, along with four of her other works: The Embalmer, Beautiful People, Haunted House and R.I.P.: Requiem in Phonybrian. Beni Axia Conrad translated IC in a Sunflower from Japanese, and Nathan Johnson adapted it for an English-language audience. Tokyopop published it on January 2, 2007 (ISBN 978-1-59816-769-6). However, Tokyopop's North American branch stopped publishing on May 31, 2011.

== Reception and legacy ==
IC in a Sunflower was positively received by English-language reviewers and readers. The manga ranked eighth on About.com's 2007 Reader Poll for the best new josei manga, manga targeted towards women. Douresseaux praised the collection as "easily some of [Mihara's] best work made available in English." Sparrow highly recommended the manga, describing it as "a darker counterpart to Beautiful People." The art was a frequent source of praise among reviewers, although Grendall wrote that some of the older stories had art not on the same level of refinement as her later work Doll. Mihara's storytelling also went over well with critics; Oxford commended Mihara's ability to create unrelated short stories, something not commonly seen in manga. Rating the manga two-and-a-half out of four stars, Thompson enjoyed some of the stories, but felt that the occasionally predictable endings or "ideas" that the story failed to expand upon hurt the manga. Upon learning that her illustrations and stories in general had been positively received in the West, Mihara was surprised and pleased "that people are overcoming the cultural barrier and just getting the message!"

Appearing as a serial in Feel Young from 1998 to 2002, Mihara's science-fiction josei manga Doll examines the relationships between the eponymous androids and their human owners in the future. The narrative primarily consists of unrelated short stories, but also develops an overall plot involving Ichiro, a man who illegally remodels the androids, and his revenge against the corporation which creates them. The character Vanilla from "The Sunflower Quality Of An Integrated Circuit" appears in Doll as one of the nine prototypes. Discovered by Ichiro and his Doll companion, she acts as if she suffers from psychological trauma, (Note: While the protagonists discuss the possibility of Dolls possessing emotions, Mihara has stated in an interview that Dolls can only mimic them.) which she overcomes by recovering her memories of having to bury her master.
