= Haunted House (manga) =

Manga by Mitsukazu Mihara

- The English-language cover as published by Tokyopop

ホーンテッドハウス (Hōnteddo Hausu)
- Genre: Horror, Black comedy
- Manga
- Written by: Mitsukazu Mihara
- Published by: Shodensha
- English publisher: NA: Tokyopop
- Magazine: Monthly Feel Young
- Published: October 8, 2002
- Volumes: 1

Haunted House (Japanese: ホーンテッドハウス, Hepburn: Hōnteddo Hausu) is a comedy horror manga written and illustrated by Mitsukazu Mihara. Known for her short stories and characters dressed in the Gothic Lolita fashion, Mihara continued her use of death-themed material in Haunted House, a volume of one-shot chapters focusing on the teenage protagonist's attempts to find and keep a girlfriend despite his gothic family. Shodensha published Haunted House in Japan on October 8, 2002.

Tokyopop licensed it for an English-language release in North America, along with four of her other works, and released it on October 10, 2006. English-language critics were divided on whether it was enjoyable or repetitive, with several comparing it to the Addams Family.

== Plot ==
Haunted House consists of one-shot chapters connected by the teenage protagonist, Sabato Obiga—his first name refers to Sabbath. In each, he attempts to find and keep a girlfriend, whom his gothic family inevitably frightens away. His family is made up of his father, who works at a bank; his mother, a reader of poetry; twin sisters Lisa and Misa, both of whom create voodoo dolls; and their black cat. In Haunted House, Mitsukazu Mihara continued her use of death-themed material—also seen in her other manga The Embalmer and R.I.P.: Requiem in Phonybrian.

== Release ==
Written and illustrated by Mitsukazu Mihara, Haunted House was published in Japan by Shodensha on October 8, 2002 (ISBN 4396762887). Tokyopop licensed it for an English-language release in North America—along with four of her other works: The Embalmer, Beautiful People, IC in a Sunflower and R.I.P.: Requiem in Phonybrian—and released it on October 10, 2006 (ISBN 978-1-59816-321-6).

== Reception ==
Critical reaction to Haunted House was mixed. Critics drew comparisons between the manga and the Addams Family. The Comic Book Bin's Leroy Douresseaux felt that her elaborate art partially helped to counterbalance the morbid material, and rated the manga 5/10. While enjoying the occasional "cute and mildly amusing moments", Ryan Huston of MangaLife felt that the gothic stock elements, repetitive plot and "lackluster" art hurt the volume. Conversely, Katherine Dacey praised the "elegant, stylized character designs" and enjoyable story, though she commented that the "moral is delivered a little too neatly". Another reviewer greatly enjoyed the comedy aspect of Haunted House, though wrote that "it was an acquired taste".
