= Shōnen manga =

Manga aimed at adolescent boys

Shōnen manga (少年漫画; lit. "boys' comics", also romanized as shonen, shounen or syônen) is an editorial category of Japanese comics targeting an audience of mainly adolescent boys. It is, along with shōjo manga (targeting adolescent girls and young women), seinen manga (targeting young adult men), and josei manga (targeting adult women), one of the primary demographic categories of manga and, by extension, of Japanese anime. Shōnen manga is traditionally published in dedicated manga magazines that often almost exclusively target the shōnen demographic group.

Of the four primary demographic categories of manga, shōnen is the most popular category in the Japanese market. While shōnen manga ostensibly targets an audience of young males, its actual readership extends significantly beyond this target group to include all ages and genders. The category originated from Japanese children's magazines at the turn of the 20th century and gained significant popularity by the 1920s.

The editorial focus of shōnen manga is primarily on action, adventure, and fighting against monsters or other clearly defined forces of evil. Though action narratives dominate the category, there is deep editorial diversity and a significant number of genres and sub-genres within shōnen manga, especially compared to other comic cultures outside of Japan, including comedy, crime, romance, slice of life, and sports.

== Terminology and etymology ==
=== Shōnen ===
The Japanese word shōnen (少年; Japanese pronunciation: [ɕoːnen] lit. "few years"), meaning "young boy", historically referred to juveniles in a general sense and was used by the Japanese publishing industry until the end of the 19th century to designate publications aimed at children and young people. The word shifted to its current usage of referring specifically to media aimed at adolescent boys, beginning with the practice of segmenting periodicals, especially manga magazines, by sex and age-specific target groups, which was established at the beginning of the 20th century and accelerated starting in the 1960s. This segmentation system is now openly used as a categorization system by manga publishers and extends into works that are adapted from manga, such as anime.

=== Shōnen manga ===
Shōnen manga refers to manga aimed at an audience of adolescent boys, with the primary target audience alternately defined as 10 to 19 years old and as 12 to 21 years old. It is the most popular category in the Japanese market of the four primary demographic categories of manga (shōnen, shōjo, seinen, and josei).

The actual readership of shōnen manga, as is the case for all demographic categories of manga, extends significantly beyond this adolescent male target group to include all ages and genders. For example, a 2006 survey of female manga readers found that Weekly Shōnen Jump was the most popular manga magazine among this demographic, placing ahead of magazines that specifically target a female readership. The target group orientation of shōnen manga is particularly evident in the non-manga content of shōnen manga magazines, which include advertising and articles on topics tailored to the interests of young males, such as video games. Non-manga content often corresponds to a major manga series in a given magazine, for example, advertisements for a video game adaptation of the series or articles about an animated film adaptation of the series.

== History ==
=== Pre-war and wartime era ===
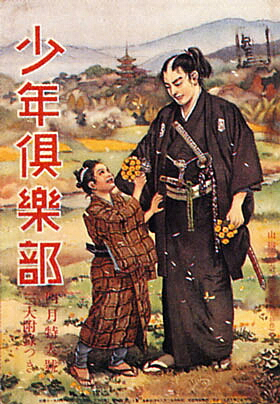
The cover of the April 1929 issue of Shōnen Club

Children's magazines with sex-segregated readerships have existed in Japan since the early 1900s. While early youth magazines were ostensibly unisex – Shōnen Sekai was the first youth magazine in Japan in 1895, targeting a readership of both boys and girls – in practice, the editorial content of these publications largely concerned topics that were thought to be of interest to boys. This provoked the emergence of first exclusively shōjo (girls) magazines in 1902, and shōnen magazines subsequently began to exclusively target a male audience.

Initially, these magazines did not publish manga. The first shōnen magazine to do so was Shōnen Pakku, first published in 1907. This was followed by Shōnen Club in 1914 and later Yōnen Club. Among the most successful and influential manga series in these early shōnen magazines were Norakuro by Suihō Tagawa, which follows the life of an anthropomorphic dog soldier, and Tank Tankuro by Gajo Sakamoto, about a robot-like character who can change his appearance.

Shōnen magazines enjoyed significant popularity during the 1920s and 1930s, with Yōnen Club selling over 950,000 copies. During the Second Sino-Japanese War and Second World War, magazine sales declined and publications were used increasingly for wartime propaganda purposes. The manga content in these publications was reduced, and the series that remained typically focused on patriotic and militaristic themes, such as stories about samurai. In other stories, robots were depicted as fighting in the war against the Allied forces, as analogous to western superhero comics that depicted superheroes fighting the Axis powers during this same period.

=== Post-war era ===
During the post-war occupation of Japan, the Japanese publishing industry was rebuilt under initially strict guidelines. Stories focused on war, combat, and most competitive sports were banned with the aim of discouraging belligerence and hindering the use of manga for pro-Imperial propaganda. Manga developed during this period under the influence of artist Osamu Tezuka, with series such as Astro Boy and Kimba the White Lion. Tezuka was inspired by American cartoons, and pioneered the so-called "story manga": long-running manga series with a cinematic style and continuity across multiple chapters, contrasting what had previously been a medium defined by one-off comic strips. Science fiction stories about robots, space travel, and heroic space-faring adventures enjoyed popularity during this period; many sci-fi stories took themes and concepts from war comics and re-imagined them with pacifist ideals, such as Tetsujin 28-go by Mitsuteru Yokoyama.

One of the first new shōnen manga magazines of the post-war period was Manga Shōnen, which launched in 1947 and published works by Tezuka, Leiji Matsumoto, and Shōtarō Ishinomori. As post-war censorship codes were repealed and Japan entered a period of significant economic development in the 1950s, sales of manga and the number of manga magazines increased significantly, and shōnen and shōjo manga came to further establish themselves as distinct categories. The first works of sports manga also emerged from shōnen manga during this time; notable early works include Igaguri-kun by Eiichi Fukui as the first manga series in the genre, and Ashita no Joe by Asao Takamori and Tetsuya Chiba, which became one of the most commercially successful works in the genre.

1959 saw the launch of Shōnen Sunday and Weekly Shōnen Magazine, the first weekly shōnen manga magazines. Other weeklies, such as Shōnen Champion, Shōnen King, and Shōnen Ace, emerged in the 1960s. Weekly Shōnen Jump was first published in 1968, and would establish itself as the best-selling manga magazine across demographic categories, a position it holds to this day. Many of the most popular and commercially successful shōnen series originated in Weekly Shōnen Jump, including Dragon Ball by Akira Toriyama, Naruto by Masashi Kishimoto, Bleach by Tite Kubo, One Piece by Eiichiro Oda, and Slam Dunk by Takehiko Inoue.

=== Modern era ===
Seinen manga became formalized as a category of manga aimed at an older male audience in the late 1960s and early 1970s, and many shōnen artists associated with the realist gekiga movement migrated to seinen manga. The demise of the kashi-hon (rental manga) market led many kashi-hon artists to move into magazine publishing, including shōnen manga, bringing their distinct themes and style with them. As a result, shōnen manga came to deal with more serious and political themes, and saw an increase in depictions of violent and explicit subjects, as well as an increase in profanity. Significant artists of this era include Shigeru Mizuki, creator of the horror series GeGeGe no Kitarō; and George Akiyama, whose shōnen manga series Ashura depicts cannibalism, child abuse, and mass murder. Although this provoked a public backlash, it did not lead to the decline for the industry: series with anarchic, offensive humor became popular in shōnen and seinen manga alike, with Crayon Shin-Chan by Yoshito Usui becoming an internationally famous example of this phenomenon. Manga artist Go Nagai originated the sexually charged ecchi genre with Harenchi Gakuen, which was serialized in Weekly Shōnen Jump. Weekly Shōnen Jump and similar magazines have been influential in the international spread of shōnen manga, particularly through globally successful series such as Dragon Ball, One Piece, and Naruto.

The stylistic and thematic differences between shōnen and shōjo began to narrow considerably beginning in the 1980s, with widespread exchange of stylistic devices and themes. For example, the characteristic large eyes of shōjo manga became common in shōnen manga to convey the emotions of characters, and female characters have enjoyed greater prominence as both supporting and primary characters in shōnen manga. Other graphic storytelling techniques that originated in shōjo manga, such as montages of multiple panels, were imported into shōnen manga and have become common stylistic devices.

In the 1980s, combat-focused "battle manga" stories became popular, with Dragon Ball and Fist of the North Star emerging as representative works of this development. Manga critic Jason Thompson credits the success of Dragon Ball, first published in 1984, as originating a trend that has persisted to contemporary shōnen manga of favoring cartoonish art styles over the more mature art styles of shōnen titles such as City Hunter and Fist of the North Star.

Female manga artists also began to enjoy increasing critical and commercial success as shōnen manga creators. As a result of the combined influence of ecchi and the rise of female artists, romance emerged as a subgenre of shōnen manga, especially romantic comedy. When manga began to emerge in the Western world in the early 1990s, the shōnen category was so dominant in these new markets that it came to shape the image of manga as a whole. While shōjo made gains in popularity by the 2000s, shōnen remains the most popular category of manga, both in Japan and internationally.

== Characteristics ==
=== Themes and genres ===
This thematic orientation of shōnen manga is readily inferred from the formal values or slogans that shōnen manga magazines assign themselves: for example, "friendship, perseverance, and victory" for Weekly Shōnen Jump, and "courage, friendship and fighting spirit" for CoroCoro Comic. The editorial focus of shōnen manga is primarily on action, adventure, and the fighting of monsters or other forces of evil. Action stories are so dominant in shōnen manga that some manga and non-manga works are occasionally designated as shōnen not because of their ostensible target group, but because of their content focus on action and adventure. Though action narratives dominate the category, there is deep editorial diversity and a significant number of genres and subgenres within shōnen manga, especially when compared to other comic cultures outside of Japan. This includes but is not limited to comedy, crime, romance, slice of life, and stories about activities such as sports and the lives of different types of working professionals. In recent years, isekai—a subgenre involving protagonists transported or reincarnated into alternate worlds—has become increasingly prominent within shōnen manga and related media.

The action genre is itself is expressed through a variety of subgenres, from historical and contemporary drama to science fiction and fantasy. Shōnen war fiction has been alternately jingoistic or critical of militarism and violence, with Barefoot Gen by Keiji Nakazawa as a notable example of the latter. Samurai appeared frequently as idealized role models for boy readers in early shōnen, analogous to representations of cowboys in western comics; samurai stories shifted to comedy and sportsmanship in the post-war period, before returning to themes of idealized themes of good versus evil. Though shōnen manga typically attempts to convey a message of peace, the category has been criticized by individuals such as director Hayao Miyazaki for promoting overly simple good/evil dichotomies.

=== Narrative conventions ===
A shōnen protagonist is often characterized by contradictory qualities: short-tempered and cool, mischievous and rebellious, serious and cynical, clumsy and infallible, or who appears as a good-for-nothing but possesses hidden abilities. In some cases, the contradiction takes on a literal form in the form of henshin (変身; lit. 'transformation'), where the hero is able to switch between two personas with different appearances and personalities; examples of this device include Yu-Gi-Oh by Kazuki Takahashi and Samurai Deeper Kyo by Akimine Kamijyo. Transformation abilities are often linked with bonds to a spirit, monster or robot. A major narrative device in shōnen manga is rivalry between the protagonist and his opponent, with a fight or a quest often appearing as a central element; Dragon Ball is among the most popular and commercially successful examples of this archetypal story.

Typically, a shōnen protagonist is an outsider, or in some way disadvantaged compared to others, but who through training, perseverance, and willpower eventually succeeds against all odds. Plots typically follow the basic structure of the hero's journey, with much of the story focused on the protagonist's training and transformation into a hero, and on characters who earn their status as heroes through effort and tenacity rather than by virtue of birth or assignment. For long-running series, the hero's journey repeats itself; as a new story arc begins, the enemy becomes more powerful and the danger to be overcome becomes greater. In addition to these external conflicts, a shōnen protagonist often also faces internal conflicts, typically focused around maturity and growing older. In contrast to shōjo manga, which often focuses on the thoughts and interior monologue of the hero, shōnen typically advances plot through dialogue and action. Happy endings are common in shōnen manga, but are not obligatory.

=== Visual style ===
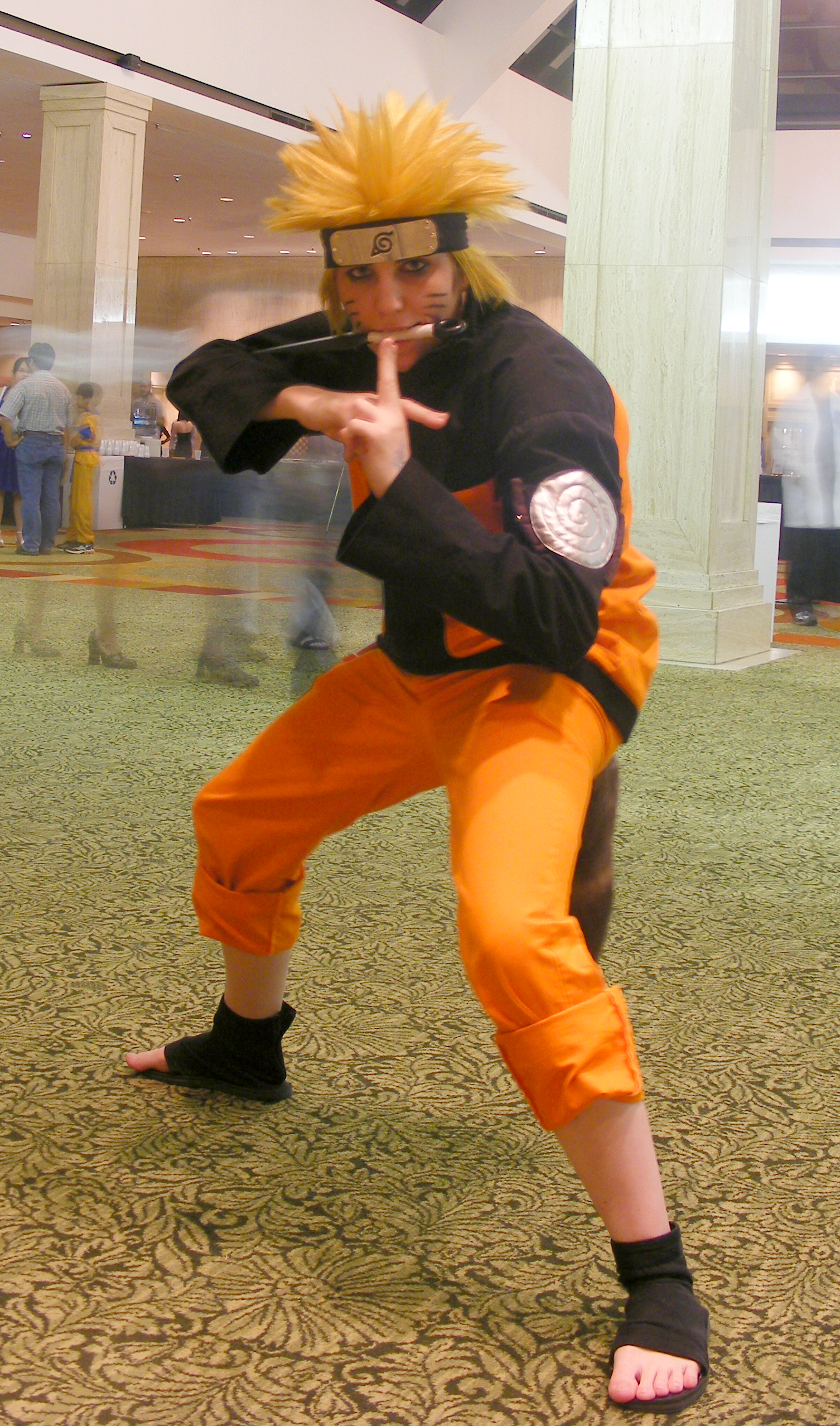
A cosplayer dressed as Naruto Uzumaki from Naruto, displaying the characteristic "spiky" hairstyle

Comics theorist Neil Cohn regards the art style of shōnen as generally "edgier" than that of shōjo manga, and notes how most regular manga readers are able to easily distinguish between shōnen and shōjo based on visual appearance alone. Visually, a shōnen protagonist often possesses what manga critic Jason Thompson describes as "insanely spiky hair" that distinguishes the protagonist's silhouette from that of other characters. The eyes of shōnen characters in the post-war period are significantly smaller than those of characters in shōjo manga; large eyes are used in shōjo manga to better convey the emotions of the characters, an aspect which has historically been given less focus in shōnen manga. A common visual device in shōnen action scenes is to depict the contours of figures with rough, coarse motion lines to give the appearance of movement. In interviews, manga artists have discussed differing creative processes and visual techniques, highlighting variation in how shōnen manga is produced.

=== Role of women ===
Historically, the protagonists of shōnen manga were almost exclusively men and boys; women and girls appeared primarily in supporting roles as sisters, mothers, or girlfriends, if at all. This was especially true of sexualized ecchi stories that developed out of shōnen manga beginning in the 1970s, with The Abashiri Family by Go Nagai as one of the earliest representative works of this development, as well as an early example of a shōnen manga with a female protagonist. Studies of gendered language in shōnen manga have found that female characters are often written with more stereotypically feminine speech patterns, reflecting broader conventions in manga characterization.

Women and girls have generally played a more active role in shōnen manga since the 1980s, fighting alongside male characters and not merely as passive support. Dr. Slump by Akira Toriyama was an early representative work of this development, with its mischievous child protagonist Arale Norimaki being among the first shōnen manga to depict this type of archetypal character as a girl rather than a boy. The 1980s also saw female shōnen manga artists rise to greater prominence: notably horror manga artist Kei Kusunoki, and Rumiko Takahashi with her romantic comedies Urusei Yatsura and Ranma ½.

Especially in shōnen series that are aimed at an older audience, female characters are often presented in a manner that is attractive to the male target audience as bishōjos (literally "beautiful young girls"). They exist as objects of romantic or sexual desire not merely for the male characters, but also for the ostensibly heterosexual male reader as a form of fan service. While these objectifying tropes have persisted in shōnen manga, women have also developed more active roles in these fan service-oriented stories. A common romantic comedy trope in shōnen manga since the 1980s has been to pair a weak male protagonist with a strong female love interest who is not only the target of his romantic and sexual desire, but also his good friend and confidante. In the harem genre, which originated from shōnen manga, a male protagonist is surrounded by several female characters who desire him, and who are often more confident and assertive than he is; examples include Negima! Magister Negi Magi by Ken Akamatsu and Hanaukyo Maid Team by Morishige. In other cases, the male protagonist is unsuccessful in his attempts to woo the female character, or the story is focused around the originally naïve and infantile male protagonist maturing and learning how to develop healthy relationships with women.

For certain shōnen series, a female readership who read in or interpret subtextual homoerotic relationships between canonically heterosexual male characters constitute a significant proportion of the series' audience; this is especially true of series featuring male characters who are bishōnen (literally "beautiful boys"), or who are perceived as such by readers. This reading of shōnen manga is expressed in the form of fan works such as dōjinshi (self-published amateur manga) and the boys' love (BL) genre of manga and anime, which includes both original and derivative works. Manga scholar Yukari Fujimoto notes in her analysis of the female readership of the shōnen titles One Piece, Naruto, and The Prince of Tennis that homoerotic interpretations of shōnen manga tend to be most common among titles that do not include prominent female characters that a female readership is able to identify with.

== Magazines ==
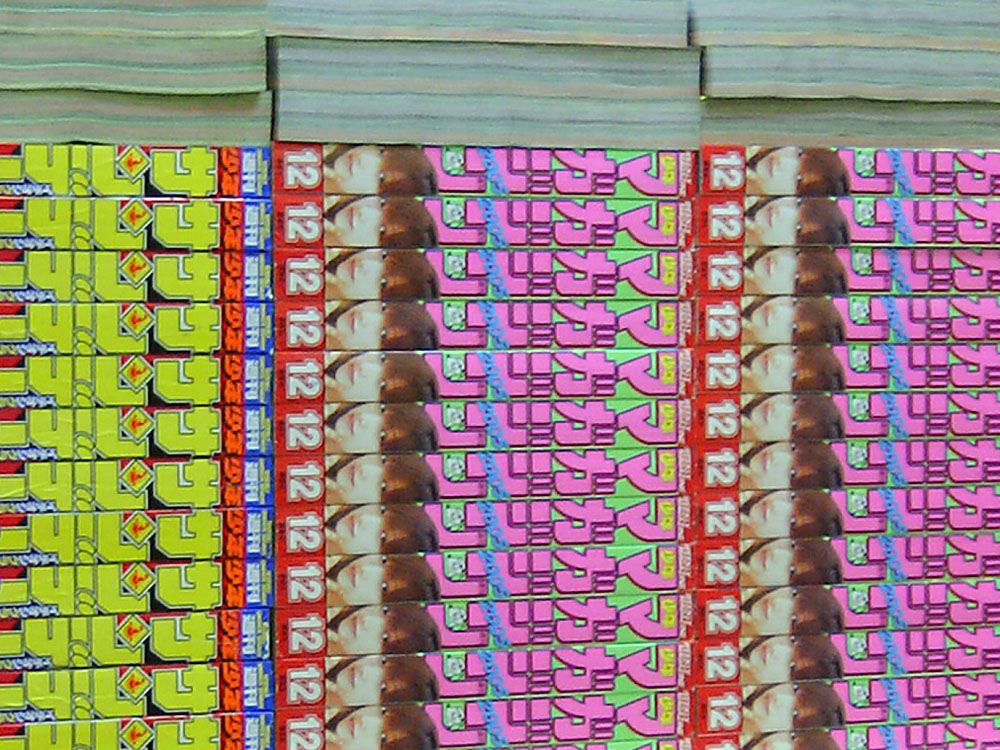
Stacks of Weekly Shōnen Magazine and Weekly Shōnen Sunday in 2005

Shōnen manga is traditionally published in dedicated manga magazines that specifically target an audience of shōnen. At the industry's peak in the mid-1990s, there were 23 total shōnen magazines, which collectively sold 662 million copies in 1995. The total manga magazine market that year included 265 magazines, with a total of 1.595 billion copies sold.

A manga magazine is typically several hundred pages long, and contains over a dozen series or one-shots. The largest Japanese shōnen magazines in terms of circulation are Weekly Shōnen Jump by Shueisha, Weekly Shōnen Magazine by Kodansha, and Weekly Shōnen Sunday by Shogakukan; these publishers are also the largest publishers of manga generally. The fourth largest magazine, albeit by a significant margin, is Weekly Shōnen Champion by Akita Shoten, which was among the most popular manga magazines in the 1970s and 1980s.

The magazines CoroCoro Comic and the now-defunct Comic BomBom technically belong to the kodomo (children's manga) demographic, but are often counted as shōnen magazines as they target an audience of school-aged boys. The following is a list of the top shōnen magazines by circulation during the timespan of April 1 to June 30, 2026.

Title	Circulation
Weekly Shōnen Jump	985,000
Weekly Shōnen Magazine	281,000
V Jump	156,667
Weekly Shōnen Sunday	120,000
Monthly Shōnen Magazine	95,500
Jump Square	85,000
Saikyō Jump	71,667
Shōnen Sunday S	20,000
Bessatsu Shōnen Magazine	8,000
Monthly Shōnen Sunday	8,000
Monthly Shōnen Sirius	6,900
