= Koi Koi Seven =

Japanese manga series

こいこい7 (Koi Koi 7)
- Genre: Comedy, harem
- Manga
- Written by: Morishige
- Published by: Akita Shoten
- Magazine: Champion Red (2002−2006); Champion Red Ichigo (2007)
- Original run: October 2002 – April 2007
- Volumes: 9
- Anime television series
- Directed by: Yoshitaka Fujimoto
- Written by: Tamotsu Mizukoshi
- Studio: Studio Flag; Trinet Entertainment
- Licensed by: NA: Discotek Media
- Original run: April 4, 2005 – June 26, 2005
- Episodes: 13

Koi Koi Seven (こいこい7) is a Japanese manga series created by Morishige. The story features a fighting squad of six girls (Koi Koi Seven) belonging to the Gokō Academy who fight daily to protect the Earth's peace and future, as well as the hopeless Tanaka Tetsuro. Koi Koi Seven was serialized in Akita Shoten's Champion Red line of magazines from 2002 to 2007. The series was adapted into a 13-episode anime television series which was broadcast between April 4, 2005, and June 26, 2005.

== Plot ==
Tetsuro Tanaka is transferred to Gokoh Academy full of high expectations. However, expectations fade with a bad premonition the moment he steps onto the campus and finds all the students except him are girls. A series of strange events fall upon him. Then, six girls who are called Koi Koi Seven appear as his guardians. Army combat helicopters and anti-tank guns attack Tetsuro for no particular reason as he tries to survive each day in the academy. Surrounded by many girls he gets into trouble every day because he often sees them naked, usually by mistake. In the dorm the same problem continues with the Koi Koi 7 team walking around the house in their underwear. On top of this, Celonious 28 also chases after him all the time because she wants to be with him. As well, Asuka Yayoi feels jealous of him because she loves him and she doesn't want him to hang around with other girls, which is very difficult because he is the only boy in the school and the girls are after him all the time. In general each girl of the Koi Koi 7 team has secret feelings for Tetsuro but they don't show them.

== Characters ==
Tetsuro Tanaka (田中 哲朗, Tanaka Tetsurō)
Voiced by: Yūki Tai
The school's only male student.

Yayoi Asuka (飛鳥 ヤヨイ, Asuka Yayoi)
Voiced by: Saori Gotō
The main heroine of the story, part of a group of girls who call themselves the "Koi Koi 7".

Sakuya Kazamatsuri (風祭 サクヤ, Kazamatsuri Sakuya)
Voiced by: Ayako Itō
One of Tetsuro's roommates, an expert at firearms.

Miyabi Tsukuyomi (月読 ミヤビ, Tsukuyomi Miyabi)
Voiced by: Akiko Kawase
Roommate of Tetsuro.
Hifumi Inokai (猪飼 ヒフミ, Inokai Hifumi)
Voiced by: Kimiko Koyama
One of Tetsuro's roommates.

Akiwo Suzuka (鈴鹿 アキヲ, Suzuka Akiwo)
Voiced by: Yūko Gibu
One of Tetsuro's roommates.

Otome Chono (蝶野 オトメ, Chono Otome)
Voiced by: Yūna Inamura
One of Tetsuro's roommates.

Kozoma
(people who joined the school in their senior year) This group includes all six girls in the Koi Koi 7, plus Tetsuro.

Yayoi Asuka (Celonius 28) (アスカヤヨイ (セロニアス28号))
Voiced by: Nana Mizuki
A mysterious girl with an eyepatch.

Orie Kano (花皇 ヲリエ, Kano Orie)
Voiced by: Akiko Kimura
The teacher, who also lives in the student dorm with Tetsuro and the Koi Koi 7 girls.

Kongō Higashikazuno (東和野 金剛, Higashikazuno Kongō)
Voiced by: Norio Wakamoto
The headmaster whoser mission is to stop Tetsuro's father.

Miya Higashikazuno (東和野 ミヤ, Higashikazuno Miya)
Voiced by: Tsubasa Otomiya
Grandchild of the school's founder, leader of the Gokoh Five gang.

Hekusokazura no Kimi (屁糞蔓の君)
Voiced by: Saki Nakajima
Second in command at the Gokoh Five.

Kazuko Iidabashi (飯田橋 和子, Iidabashi Kazuko)
Voiced by: Rumi Abe
A member of the Gokoh Five.

Chuko Asakusabashi (浅草橋 中子, Asakusabashi Chūko)
Voiced by: Kana Masaki
A member of the Gokoh Five.

Yoko Suidobashi (水道橋 洋子, Suidobashi Yōko)
Voiced by: Yoshimi Ninomiya
A member of the Gokoh Five.

Isuzu Yamada (山田 イスズ, Yamada Isuzu)
Voiced by: Miyu Matsuki
A student who is in love with Satou.

Subaru Satou (佐藤 スバル, Satō Subaru)
Voiced by: Miho Miyagawa
Another student who is in love with Yamada.

== Media ==
=== Manga ===
Koi Koi Seven was first serialized in Akita Shoten's Champion Red magazine in 2002. The individual chapters were subsequently released in nine compiled tankōbon volumes, the last of which was released March 20, 2007.

No.	Release date	ISBN
1	March 13, 2003	4-253-23000-8
2	August 21, 2003	4-253-23001-6
3	March 25, 2004	4-253-23002-4
4	November 25, 2004	4-253-23003-2
5	March 19, 2005	4-253-23004-0
6	September 20, 2005	4-253-23005-9
7	March 20, 2006	4-253-23006-7
8	October 20, 2006	4-253-23007-5
9	March 20, 2007	978-4-253-23008-7

=== Anime ===
A 13-episode anime television series adaptation aired in Japan between April 2 and June 25 of 2005. The anime consisted of 2 short specials that were released with the DVDs on January 27, 2006.

==== List of episodes ====
No.	Title	Written by	Original air date
1	"Flowers are in Full Bloom!"; Transliteration: "Hanabira Mankai!" (Japanese: 花弁（はなびら）満開！)	Tamotsu Mizukoshi	April 3, 2005
1	"Koi Koi Sevens Love is in Full Throttle"; Transliteration: "Koi no Hanasaku Koi Koi 7 desu~" (Japanese: 恋の華咲くこいこい7です～)	Tamotsu Mizukoshi	April 3, 2005
Tetsuro transfers to what turns out to be an otherwise all-girl school where he is befriended by Yayoi, who claims to know him. Miya decides that Tetsuro needs to be taught a lesson, and commands the Gokō Five to kidnap and humiliate him, but the Koi Koi Seven come to his rescue. A sentai-mecha battle ensues. At the end of a tiring day, Tetsuro retires to his school dorm, only to discover that he is housed with Yayoi and the Koi Koi Seven. His teacher Ms. Kano is the dorm supervisor.
2	"Girls Bravo!"; Transliteration: "Shōjo Banzai (Gāruzu Burabō)!" (Japanese: 少女万歳(ガールズブラボー)！)	Aya Yashiro	April 10, 2005
2	"Get Wet, Get Washed Away! It's Miya-Sama's Revenge"; Transliteration: "Yuretenagarete! Gyakushu no Miya-sama desu~" (Japanese: 揺れて流れて！逆襲のミヤ様です～)	Aya Yashiro	April 10, 2005
Fed up with the girls fighting over him, to say nothing of them flaunting their underwear, Tetsuro calls his father and asks to be transferred to another school, but is told to stick it out. Kano overhears and reports the conversation to the headmaster. At school, Miya snares and ties him suspended over the pool. Tetsuro is forced to watch from this position as the girls compete for him, first swimming a medley relay, then wrestling "Mongolian-style" (the objective being to strip the pants from one's opponent), and finally in a volleyball game. The Koi Koi Seven win every event: witnessing their determination, Tetsuro admits that there is something to be said for girls who go to such extent for his sake. Still not satisfied, Miya reactivates her mecha, merging all five into a super-robot, only to be humiliated by a malfunction. Celonius 28 makes her first appearance, floating alone in the pool, calling Tetsuro's name.
3	"Special Effects Are On Fire!"; Transliteration: "Tokusatsu Jimoe (Geki Faiyā)!" (Japanese: 特撮激燃(ゲキファイヤー)！)	Tamotsu Mizukoshi	April 17, 2005
3	"Beyond Akiwo's Heart...What?"; Transliteration: "Akiwo, Kokoro no Mukou ni...desu~" (Japanese: アキヲ、心の向こうに...です～)	Tamotsu Mizukoshi	April 17, 2005
Garbed as one of her favorite cartoon heroes, Akiwo battles the nefarious Sailor-Bloomer Mask, a vacuum-equipped villain who sucks the uniforms off of unsuspecting high school girls, leaving them screaming in their underwear.
4	"Beautiful Flowers Are Soon Picked!"; Transliteration: "Bijinhakumei!?" (Japanese: 美人薄命！？)	Aya Yashiro	April 24, 2005
4	"What Is Otome's Daydream?"; Transliteration: "Otome-chan wa Nani o Yumemiru? desu~" (Japanese: ヲトメちゃんは何を夢みる？です～)	Aya Yashiro	April 24, 2005
It rains. Otome gets wet.
5	"Splendides! Concours De Beauté"; Transliteration: "Gōkakenran Bakunyu Taikai" (Japanese: 豪華絢爛爆乳大会)	Tamotsu Mizukoshi	May 1, 2005
5	"Traansperce Le Ciel D'Odaiba"; Transliteration: "Odaiba no Sora o Tsuranuite desu~" (Japanese: お台場の空をつらぬいてです～)	Tamotsu Mizukoshi	May 1, 2005
Miya hosts a swimsuit competition to celebrate the opening of her space elevator at Odaiba. The Koi Koi 7 girls enter because they need the 1 million yen cash prize to repair the house after it was damaged by Miyabi's hair. Miyabi wins the competition, but turns down the bonus prize of joining Gokō 5, so Miya refuses to hand over the cash, instead attacking with a giant robot. Miyabi defeats the robot with her hair, destroying the space elevator in the process. Celonius 28 takes a pot shot at Yayoi, but Miyabi blocks this too.
6	"Hot-Blooded Fighting Spirit! Pitiless Sergeant!"; Transliteration: "Nekketsu Tōkon / Oni Gunsō-dono!" (Japanese: 熱血闘魂・鬼軍曹どのっ！)	Aya Yashiro	May 8, 2005
6	"Work Like a Devil, Sakuya!"; Transliteration: "Seisaku Shinkō Sakuya-san desu~" (Japanese: 制作進行サクヤさんです～)	Aya Yashiro	May 8, 2005
A meta-episode about making an anime on an impossible deadline. Sakuya is the Production Manager.
7	"Storm of White Lilies!"; Transliteration: "Shirayuri no Arashi!" (Japanese: 白百合嵐（しらゆりのあらし）！)	Tamotsu Mizukoshi	May 15, 2005
7	"Ah! My Sweet Darling, I Think of You Wherever You Are!"; Transliteration: "Aä, Uruwashi no Kimi yo * Omoi Haruka ni...desu~" (Japanese: 嗚呼、麗しの君よ☆想い遥かに...です～)	Tamotsu Mizukoshi	May 15, 2005
While preparing for the school festival, Tetsuro's uniform and glasses are destroyed in a painting accident, so Yayoi dresses him up in a girl's uniform. Miya is taken by this fresh-faced newcomer, adopting "Tetsuko Nakata" as her younger sister, and insists that they exchange ribbons. The members of Koi Koi 7 convince Tetsuro to return the ribbon, which he does reluctantly, knowing Miya will be crushed -- and she is, attacking yet again in a giant robot. Celonius 28 has by this time infiltrated the school, and posing as a student, saves Tetsuro from Miya, kissing him before disappearing once again with Kano hot on her tail.
8	"The Goddess Awakens!?"; Transliteration: "Megami Kakusei!?" (Japanese: 女神覚醒！？)	Tamotsu Mizukoshi	May 22, 2005
8	"Light and Darkness of Yayoi Asuka"; Transliteration: "Hikari to Kage no Asuka Yayoi-chan desu~" (Japanese: 光と影のアスカヤヨイちゃんです～)	Tamotsu Mizukoshi	May 22, 2005
On the day of the festival, Tetsuro is pressed into service at the class's maid cafe, once again being forced to cross dress. Tetsuko's reappearance as a maid brings Miya to the cafe, but Tetsuro is saved by Celonius 28, who whisks him away under the cover of a blackout. Yayoi happens upon the couple in the garden and the two Yayois confer privately. 28 attacks, defeating the Koi Koi 7 by exploiting their weaknesses, but when she slaps Tetsuro aside for attempting to intervene, Yayoi rises again and, saying that she will always protect Tetsuro, immolates 28 in blaze of brilliant white light. Tetsuro begs Kano to save 28, so she installs 28's program in one of Otome's spare bodies.
9	"Advent of a Little Girl!"; Transliteration: "Yōjo Kōrin!!" (Japanese: 幼女降臨！！)	Aya Yashiro	May 29, 2005
9	"First Outing of Gantai, the Resurrected Girl."; Transliteration: "Gantai-chan, Hajimete no Osanpo desu~" (Japanese: ガンタイちゃん、初めてのお散歩です～)	Aya Yashiro	May 29, 2005
Gentai, who has no memory of #28, but still thinks of herself as Yayoi, is bored. Feeling out of place, she wanders off without telling anyone and finds her way to the school, where various scenes trigger disturbing flashbacks. Kazuko, Chuko and Yuko discover the lost child and bring her to Miya, telling Miya that this is a good way to polish her image, but Miya isn't very good with children. Gentai runs away and is spotted by Tetsuro, who has been searching for her, but she runs away from him too. After she finally stops, they run into Izuma and Subaru, who call Tetsuro a two-timer and a lolicon when they see him holding hands with a little girl.
10	"Sigh of Love Sick!?"; Transliteration: "Momoiro Toiki!?" (Japanese: 桃色吐息！？)	Aya Yashiro	June 5, 2005
10	"Hifumi Is in High Mood! It's a Transient Day of Love!"; Transliteration: "Hifumi-chan Mau! Utakata no Ichinichi desu~" (Japanese: ヒフミちゃん舞う！うたかたの一日です～)	Aya Yashiro	June 5, 2005
Hifumi is not acting like herself. She seems to have heard the scream of a mandoragora, and will lose all memory unless she eats the mandrake root raw. Mifumi's alternate personality irritates Kazuko, who plots to humiliate her, first soaking her school uniform, then dressing her in a robotic nurse's uniform that forces Hifumi into erotic poses while Kazuko takes pictures. Somehow Mifumi remembers Akio's name long enough to scream for help, but her personality is not restored until she eats the raw mandoragora.
11	"A Gorgeous Party!?"; Transliteration: "Shuchinikurin!?" (Japanese: 酒池肉林！？)	Aya Yashiro	June 12, 2005
11	"Miya Explodes! Showdown at the Sand Castle."; Transliteration: "Miya-sama Sakuretsu! Suna no Arashi no Katorea Shiro desu~" (Japanese: ミヤ様炸裂！砂の嵐のカトレア城です～)	Aya Yashiro	June 12, 2005
The Koi Koi 7 fight their way through Miya's Cattleya Castle to reach Gentai, but this is all just practice for the real battle.
12	"A Sensational Incident!"; Transliteration: "Kyōtendochi??" (Japanese: 驚天動地？？)	Tamotsu Mizukoshi	June 19, 2005
12	"What Do Two of You Cry Out in the Center of World!"; Transliteration: "Sekai no Chūsin de, Futari de Issho ni Nani Yobu? desu~" (Japanese: 世界の中心で、二人で一緒にナニ叫ぶ？です～)	Tamotsu Mizukoshi	June 19, 2005
Having decided not to disband after all, the Gokō 5 pick one last fight with Koi Koi 7. Their poor timing results in Kano giving all 12 of them cleaning duty for punishment, but then all the girls in school start chasing Tetsuro, and Yayoi is abducted by two advanced Celonius cyborgs.
13	"Tropical Paradise!?"; Transliteration: "Shibō Yūgi!?" (Japanese: 死亡遊戯！？)	Tamotsu Mizukoshi	June 26, 2005
13	"Fight With Naked Bodies! the Decisive Battle Field Is Tora Tora Tora"; Transliteration: "Saigo no Kibō, Himitsu soshite..." (Japanese: 最後の希望、秘密 そして...)	Tamotsu Mizukoshi	June 26, 2005
The gate to the other world is open, and it appears to be some kind of tropical paradise. Tetsuro frolics in the waves with Gentai and two other young girls. Kano suns herself on the beach, and the Koi Koi 7 play in the sand. Izuma and Subaru rub each other with suntan lotion. Offshore a sinister submarine lurks: Gokō 5 is at it again, but beats a strategic retreat when Otome gets wet. When Otome's unconscious body is beamed up by a UFO, everyone goes off in pursuit, but they are distracted by the discovery of an onsen, where the decisive battle ultimately takes place.
