= Doll (manga) =

Japanese manga series by Mitsukazu Mihara

- The English-language cover of the first Doll volume as published by Tokyopop in North America on August 10, 2004

ドｰル (Dōru)
- Manga
- Written by: Mitsukazu Mihara
- Published by: Shodensha
- English publisher: NA: Tokyopop (former); UK: Tokyopop
- Magazine: Feel Young
- Original run: 1998 – 2002
- Volumes: 6

Doll (Japanese: ドｰル, Hepburn: Dōru) is a science fiction josei (targeted towards women) manga by Mitsukazu Mihara. Appearing as a serial in the Japanese manga magazine Feel Young from 1998 to 2002, the thirty-three chapters of Doll were collected into six bound volumes by Shodensha and published from August 2000 to August 2002. Taking place in the future, the plot focuses on relationships between people and the eponymous androids; the series has an overarching plot that follows an illegal reprogrammer of Dolls and his revenge against the corporation which creates them. One of the characters, the corporation that manufactures the Dolls, and the concept of the Dolls appeared earlier in Mihara's short manga "The Sunflower Quality Of An Integrated Circuit" (集積回路のヒマワリ) (1995), later collected in IC in a Sunflower (1997).

In 2003, Tokyopop licensed the series for an English-language translations in North America and the United Kingdom, publishing the series from August 2004 to October 2005. The series has received several positive reviews from English-language critics, and the first volume placed in ICv2's list of the top 100 best-selling graphic novels for July 2004. In 2011, Tokyopop's North American branch stopped publication and returned its manga licenses.

== Plot ==
Set in the future, Doll centers around relationships between humans and the eponymous androids—created by Kaoru and Motohiko Kirishima and manufactured by SG Corporation. During the development of the "Sterol-2" Doll, Kaoru's mental condition begins to deteriorate; after attempting to retain a copy of her mind and memories in a prototype of a Doll, Motohiko realizes his mistake of trying to replace his wife. Retiring from the corporation to care for her, he leaves behind eight other prototypes, which are seen throughout the series: a nameless male Doll, who was the constant companion for a woman and cremated with her by her greedy stepson; Chocolat, a maid who was discovered in a trash heap by an elderly farming community; Honey, a secretary loyal to the SG Corporation president; Cherry, the maid to an award-winning, bulimic writer; Vanilla, a maid to an elderly man and his unfaithful, younger wife; the sexaroid Veronica, one of two Dolls built for sexual intercourse, and her unnamed partner; and S, who hunts down illegally reprogrammed Dolls for SG Corporation.

Doll also focuses on Ichiro, a reprogrammer of Dolls who was abused by his stepmother and stepsiblings. Chosen to become the next president of SG Corporation, he was castrated by his beloved Doll on the orders of his jealous relatives. His Doll, the only one who had shown him kindness, was then destroyed. No longer the successor, Ichiro studied all the aspects of the Doll business. At eighteen years old, he left and began to reprogram Dolls illegally, seeking revenge on SG Corporation. Years later, Ichiro finds the unnamed sexaroid, after Veronica is destroyed by a sadistic owner. Ichiro reprograms the sexaroid to mimic human emotions, and the sexaroid becomes Ichiro's companion.

They eventually find and purchase Vanilla, who acts as if she suffers from psychological trauma. While on a date with the sexaroid, Vanilla recovers her memories of having been ordered to bury her master's corpse by her mistress. Meanwhile, Ichiro is captured by agents of the SG Corporation. Learning of this, the sexaroid leaves to rescue him, against the wishes of another reprogrammer, Psycho Candy. Captured, tagged for destruction, and reunited with Ichiro, the sexaroid finds himself ordered by Ichiro to switch places with him and escape. Ichiro then gives the sexaroid a name, Itsuki. With Itsuki's tag for destruction, Ichiro is killed at the moment his father finally recognizes him. Doll concludes with SG Corporation's scandal and subsequent bankruptcy, as Motohiko and his wife are content with knowing that they left Dolls in the world, while Vanilla and Itsuki live together in a house purchased by Ichiro.

== Development ==
The character Vanilla, the concept of the Dolls, and SG Corporation first appeared in Mitsukazu Mihara's earlier short manga "The Sunflower Quality Of An Integrated Circuit" (集積回路のヒマワリ) (1995), later collected in IC in a Sunflower (1997). Doll began as "the simple notion of humans vs. robots". Although she often uses Lolita fashion—a clothing style influenced by the Rococo style and the Victorian and Edwardian eras—in her character designs as a way to convey the duality of her characters, she felt that the fashion failed to give the manga depth. She then centered the plots on the psychological aspects. As Mihara has expressed an interest in exploring the impact of the childhood environment on a person, especially his or her relationships with parents, the stories in Doll involve the eponymous androids and family life. Each short story contains an independent theme; "A Maid Servant", for example, takes its inspiration from a book about aging fears, and "miseducation" serves as the theme for a story about cram school, inspired by a book about the inadequacy of solely teaching theories.

The overarching plot of Doll started with the second volume; she envisioned a prodigy burdened by "parental pressure" and a Doll to heal the psychological pain. She explained that while her flaws may appear in the human characters, her "hopes for perfection" may appear in the Dolls. The Dolls, however, never developed consciousness, with the remodeled Dolls only capable of mimicking human emotion—in contrast to the typical progression of other stories in the genre. Mihara never considered making the androids capable of emotion, wishing for the narrative to center on the human characters.

== Release ==
Written and illustrated by Mitsukazu Mihara, the thirty-three chapters of Doll appeared as a serial in the Japanese josei (targeted towards women) manga magazine Feel Young, from 1998 to 2002. The chapters were collected into six bound volumes by Shodensha and published from August 10, 2000, to August 8, 2002.

In 2003, Tokyopop licensed Doll for an English-language translation in North America and the United Kingdom. The series was published from August 10, 2004, to October 11, 2005; the first volume was also published as a limited-edition hardcover on May 11, 2004. Tokyopop's North American branch stopped publishing on May 31, 2011, with its manga licenses returned. Doll has also been translated into German by Tokyopop Germany.

=== Volume list ===
No.	Original release date	Original ISBN	English release date	English ISBN
1	August 10, 2000	4396762283	August 10, 2004	978-1-59182-710-8
List 1: "A Nameless Doll"; List 2: "Maria"; List 3: "Ai"; List 4: "Kaoru"; List 5: "Ayako"; List 6: "A Maid Servant"
2	January 23, 2001	4396762399	October 12, 2004	978-1-59182-887-7
List 7: "A Doll"; List 8: "Mika"; List 9: "Mother"; List 10: "Matoko"; List 11: "DOLL House"; List 12: "S"
3	May 15, 2001	4396762461	January 11, 2005	978-1-59182-888-4
List 13: "Fake Welfare"; List 14: "Sexaroid"; List 15: "Jun"; List 16: "Baby Doll"; List 17: "Angel"
4	February 8, 2002	4396762631	April 12, 2005	978-1-59532-390-3
List 18: "Life"; List 19: "Talisman"; List 20: "Remodeller"; List 21: "Feather & Steel"; List 22: "Grave"; List 23: "Hinako"
5	April 8, 2002	4396762682	July 12, 2005	978-1-59532-391-0
List 24: "Plants"; List 25: "Unison"; List 26: "Touko"; List 27: "Chocolat"; List 28: "Rinna"
6	August 8, 2002	4396762828	October 11, 2005	978-1-59532-392-7
List 29 (Note: There is no chapter title given for List 29.); List 30: "Promise"; List 31: "Father"; List 32: "Itsuki"; List 33: "Home"

== Reception ==
The first volume of Doll debuted at the 73rd spot on ICv2's list of the top 100 best-selling graphic novels for July 2004 with an estimated 1,394 copies sold.

Doll has received several positive reviews from English-language critics. About.com's Deb Aoki placed it on her list of recommended horror manga. According to Aoki, Mihara's stories proved to be haunting, despite not following the traditional model of gory horror stories. While finding Mihara's art well-done, yet "not especially memorable", Patrick King of Animefringe wrote that Mihara's focus on the social effects of the Dolls and their environments greatly contributed to the appeal of the series. Sequential Tart's Sheena McNeil wrote that Doll examines the relationships between androids and people on "a much more serious and realistic level" than Clamp's Chobits. In follow-up reviews, she wrote that the series conveyed "a sense of reality that is unsettling and the stories are harsh reads—being violent and/or tragic." According to her, Doll simultaneously examines the meaning of humanity and modern-day fears surrounding the possibility of such androids. She also wrote that Mihara's "jaw-dropping beautiful" artwork contrasted well with the characters' misery. Jason Thompson, in Manga: The Complete Guide, wrote that childbirth and family served as the manga's themes. According to him, Mihara's character designs and artwork complemented the stories nicely. Conversely, Anime News Network's Liann Cooper reviewed the hardcover edition of Doll with mixed feelings: according to her, the stories mostly lacked entertainment value, and had artwork that failed to catch the reader's eye, but she praised the presentation. She concluded that the hardcover edition would only appeal to "avid collectors".
