= Hiroyuki Utatane =

Japanese manga artist and anime director (born 1966)

Hiroyuki Utatane (うたたね ひろゆき, Utatane Hiroyuki) is a Japanese manga artist and anime director. His wife is manga artist Ryō Ramiya.

Born 15 June 1966 in Nagaoka, Niigata Prefecture, Japan, Utatane began his career with adult works such as Countdown. In the 1990s, he worked on Sailor Moon S. His more recent works have been seinen works such as Seraphic Feather and Heaven's Prison, though he continues to release some adult works as well.

== Works ==
=== Filmography ===
- Cool Devices (クールディバイシス, Kūru Dibaishisu) (1995) Director, creator

=== Manga ===
- Temptation: Erotic Eccentric (誘惑（エロティックエキセントリック）, Yūwaku (Erotikku Ekisentorikku)) (1993)
- Seraphic Feather (セラフィック・フェザー, Serafikku Fezā) (1993)
- Lythtis (リスティス, Risutisu) (1995)
- Countdown: Sex Bombs (2000)
- Tengoku: Heaven's Prison (天獄 ―HEAVEN'S PRISON―) (2002)
