= Mitsukazu Mihara =

Japanese manga artist

- Occupation: Manga artist
- Years active: 1994–present
- Known for: Doll

Mitsukazu Mihara (三原ミツカズ, Mihara Mitsukazu; born October 17, 1970, in Hiroshima) is a Japanese illustrator who helped to influence the Gothic Lolita look through her illustrations, particularly as the cover illustrator for the first eight volumes of the Gothic & Lolita Bible. In 1994, she won a contest in the Japanese manga magazine Feel Young with her debut "Keep Those Condoms Away From Our Kids" (ゴムのいらない子供たち, "Gomu no Iranai Kodomo-tachi"), later published by Shodensha in her short story collection IC in a Sunflower (集積回路のヒマワリ, Shūseki Kairo no Himawari).

She resides in Osaka, Japan.

== Bibliography ==
=== Manga ===
- Shūseki Kairo no Himawari (集積回路のヒマワリ, IC in a Sunflower)
  (1994–97, Shodensha, 1 volume, ISBN 4396761716; English translation, 2007)
- Happī Famirī (カトゥル・カール, Happy Family)
  (1994–98, Shodensha, 3 volumes)
- Beautiful People (ビューティフルピープル, Byūtifurupīpuru)
  (1997–2001, Shodensha, 1 volume, ISBN 4396762585; English translation, 2006)
- Dōru (ドｰル, Doll)
  (1998–2002, Shodensha, 6 volumes; English translation, 2004)
- Haunted House (ホーンテッドハウス, Hōnteddohausu)
  (1998–2002, Shodensha, 1 volume, ISBN 4396762887; English translation, 2006)
- R.I.P.: Requiem in Phonybrian
  (1999–2000, 1 volume; English translation, 2006)
- Shigeshōshi (死化粧師, The Embalmer)
  (2002–05, Feel Young, Shodensha, 5 volumes; English translation, 2006)
- Dokuhime (毒姫, Poison Princess)
  (5 volumes; 5th volume; ISBN 4022141212)
- Tamashii no Futago (たましいのふたご, The Twin Souls)
  (2006, Shodensha, 1 volume, ISBN 4396763956)

=== Art collections ===
- Alice Addict
- Chocolate

=== Card box ===
- Coffin of Fools
