= Seraphic Feather =

Japanese manga series

- First tankōbon volume cover, featuring Attim M-Zak

セラフィック・フェザー (Serafikku Fezā)
- Genre: Action; Science fiction
- Manga
- Written by: Yo Morimoto (1993–1995); Toshiya Takeda (1995–2008)
- Illustrated by: Hiroyuki Utatane
- Published by: Kodansha
- English publisher: Dark Horse Comics
- Imprint: Afternoon KC
- Magazine: Monthly Afternoon
- English magazine: NA: Super Manga Blast!
- Original run: September 25, 1993 – June 25, 2008
- Volumes: 11
- icon

Seraphic Feather (Japanese: セラフィック・フェザー, Hepburn: Serafikku Fezā) is a Japanese manga series written by Yo Morimoto and Toshiya Takeda, and illustrated by Hiroyuki Utatane. It was serialized in Kodansha's seinen manga magazine Monthly Afternoon from September 1993 to June 2008, with its chapters collected in eleven tankōbon volumes. It was licensed for English release in North America by Dark Horse Comics.

== Plot ==
Sunao Oumi, a young man with psychic powers, works as a construction worker in a Lunar base on the Moon, trying to earn enough to fly back to Earth. Kei Heidemann, Sunao's childhood friend and now a United Nations Investigator, has traveled from Earth to the same base he is in with Attim M-Zak, a U.N. super-agent. She carries an Emblem Seed, a crystalline object that generates energy and can create or destroy anything from human perception, linked to an ancient alien spaceship buried beneath the Moon's surface; only very few people can control its energy. The three cross paths with each other, but are soon hunted by outside forces in search of their Emblem Seed; hidden mercenaries, corrupt corporations, and powerful alien robots controlled by Apep Heidemann, Kei's brother-in-law who wants to control the world through the power of the Emblem Seeds.

== Characters ==
Sunao Oumi (オオミ・スナオ, Ōmi Sunao)
A 17-year-old with psychokinetic powers. He had dreams of being a space pilot in his youth. He became a construction worker in a Lunar base after flying to the Moon to visit Kei's grave, trying to earn enough to fly back to Earth. While fretful, he is willing to stand up against dangerous foes. His parents died shortly after his birth.
Kei Heidemann (ケイ・ハイデマン, Kei Haideman; née Himuro)
Sunao's childhood friend and lover, who Sunao had mistaken for dead from an explosion in a Lunar base. She has trained to be a United Nations Investigator, and carries an Emblem Seed that she can unknowingly control. She had mysteriously forgotten who Sunao is, but slowly gains her memory back over the course of the story. Despite being older than Sunao, she acts more immature. She is a Seraph, like Apep.
Attim M-Zak (アティム・マザク, Atimu Mazaku)
A U.N. Special Investigator, also known as the "Crimson Angel" and "Scarlet Angel" due to her augmented superhuman abilities and tough personality. Her main weapon is a single-crystal carbon hyperfiber whip that can transform into a sword. She is close to Kei as a protector.
Apep Heidemann (アペプ・ハイデマン, Apepu Haideman)
Kei's brother-in-law, and the deputy director of Korolev Advanced Research Laboratory on the Moon. He has access to unearthly alien technology, including several Emblem Seeds that he can control. He has an androgynous appearance. He is a Seraph, and can sprout angelic wings.
Fawn Iris (ファーン・アイリス, Fān Airisu)
Apep's secretary, who is romantically involved with him.
Walt Heidemann (ウォルト・ハイデマン, Woruto Haideman)
Referred to as Dr. Heidemann. A scientist and Apep's father.
Hikaru Heidemann (ヒカル・ハイデマン, Hikaru Haideman)
Kei's older sister and Apep's wife. She died in an explosion in a Lunar base with Apep and Kei by her side.
Al-Halirha (アル・ハリハ, Aru Hariha)
Full name Essam Al-Halirha, the chairman of Dykstra Corporation (ダイスカーツ社, Daisukātsu-sha), a Moon-based global corporation funded by the United Nations.

== Publication ==
Originally written by Yo Morimoto and illustrated by Hiroyuki Utatane, Seraphic Feather began serialization in Kodansha's seinen manga magazine Monthly Afternoon on September 25, 1993. (Note: Debuted in the magazine's November 1993 issue, released on September 25.) Morimoto was replaced by Toshiya Takeda from the September 1995 issue onward, released on July 25 of that same year. The manga completed serialization on June 25, 2008. (Note: Finished in the magazine's August 2008 issue, released on June 25.) Kodansha collected its chapters in eleven tankōbon volumes, released from April 23, 1994, to September 22, 2008. The first two volumes are written by Morimoto, and the remaining nine volumes are written by Takeda.

A two-volume artbook of the manga featuring illustrations by Utatane was released on December 3, 1998 (ISBN 4-06-330061-7). One volume contained full-color illustrations, the other volume contained monochrome illustrations.

In North America, the manga was licensed for English release by Dark Horse Comics and serialized in their Super Manga Blast! manga magazine. The series ran in the magazine from March 29, 2000, to February 1, 2006, when the magazine ceased its publication, leaving the series unfinished. Dark Horse Comics collected the chapters in six volumes, which were released from November 28, 2001, to January 18, 2006.

=== Volumes ===
No.	Japanese release date	Japanese ISBN
1	April 23, 1994	978-4-06-314078-1
2	July 21, 1995	978-4-06-314116-0
3	May 23, 1996	978-4-06-314132-0
4	October 23, 1997	978-4-06-314166-5
5	February 22, 1999	978-4-06-314198-6
6	October 23, 2000	978-4-06-314252-5
7	March 22, 2002	978-4-06-314285-3
8	September 22, 2003	978-4-06-314331-7
9	March 23, 2005	978-4-06-314369-0
10	September 22, 2008	978-4-06-314520-5
11	September 22, 2008	978-4-06-314526-7

=== Dark Horse volumes ===
No.	Title	Release date	ISBN
1	Crimson Angel	November 28, 2001	978-1-56971-555-0
2	Seeds of Chaos	August 21, 2002	978-1-56971-739-4
3	Target Zone	March 5, 2003	978-1-56971-912-1
4	Dark Angel	June 15, 2005	978-1-56971-913-8
5	War Crimes	January 5, 2005	978-1-59307-198-1
6	Collision Course	January 18, 2006	978-1-59307-362-6

== Reception ==
Reviewing the manga in Manga: The Complete Guide, writer Jason Thompson rated it one out of four stars and criticized its plot and writing for being "just a clothes hanger for [Hiroyuki] Utatane's artwork", in spite of its ambitious setting. He noted how the manga "veers from fetishized cuteness to fetishized sadistic violence", and pointed to one of the volume covers featuring Attim M-Zak in revealing clothing, slicing her own breast with her sword as one example. John Jakala, reviewing issue #25 of Super Manga Blast! of which Seraphic Feather is featured, found the manga to be "largely incomprehensible" but still compelling, with "enough unique things being done with pacing and storytelling ... to hold my interest."

Seraphic Feather was mentioned in The Continuum Complete: International Encyclopedia of Sexuality as an example of a manga where "[s]exuality is an on-going presence, but is as yet not explicit." Authors Robert T. Francoeur and Raymond J. Noonan described it as a "masterpiece of drawing and design", particularly lauding Utatane's character design of Attim M-Zak.
