= Ryō Ramiya =

Japanese illustrator and manga artist

Ryō Ramiya (蘭宮 涼, Ramiya Ryō) is a Japanese illustrator and manga artist. She is married to manga artist Hiroyuki Utatane.

== Works ==
=== Anime ===
- Karakuri Ninja Girl (original creator)
- Arisa☆Good Luck (original creator)

=== Manga ===
Listed chronologically.

- Koakuma Hihyōkan (小悪魔秘宝館, March 1988, ISBN 4-7901-0003-0, Shobunkan)
- Fuwa Fuwa Cotton Kibun (ふわふわコットン気分, March 1989, ISBN 4-7901-0001-4, Shobunkan)
- Nijiiro Daireikai (匂艶大霊界, June 1990, ISBN 4-7901-0002-2, Akane Shinsha)
- Lunarium (月光宮, March 1993, ISBN 4-906186-03-3, Niji no Tabi Shuppan)
- Milky Morning (ミルキ-モ-ニング, August 1993, ISBN 4-87182-072-6, Akane Shinsha)
- Momoiro Hyaku Monogatari (ももいろ百物語, September 1993, ISBN 4-7901-0007-3, Shobunkan)
- Half Moon ni Kawaru made (ハーフムーンにかわるまで, October 1993, ISBN 4-8296-7722-8, France Shoin)
- Pretty Afternoon (プリティアフタヌーン, October 1993, ISBN 4-87182-083-1, Akane Shinsha)
- Misty Twilight (ミスティートワイライト, November 1993, ISBN 4-87182-086-6, Akane Shinsha)
- Artemis (アルテミス, December 1993, ISBN 4-7901-0020-0, Shobunkan)
- Silky Midnight (シルキー ミッドナイト, December 1993, ISBN 4-87182-090-4, Akane Shinsha)
- Lunagenic Doll (ルナジェニック・ドール, March 1995, ISBN 4-8296-7742-2, France Shoin)
- Debut (誕生~Debut~, September 1996, ISBN 4-07-305159-8, Media Works
- Private Peach (プライベート・ピーチ, July 1998, ISBN 4-8296-7377-X, France Shoin)
- Melon Scandal (メロン・スキャンダル, September 1998, ISBN 4-8296-7379-6, France Shoin)
- Sparkling Cherry (スパ-クリング・チェリ-, November 1998, ISBN 4-8296-7381-8, France Shoin)
- Luminous Girls (月煌少女, December 1999, ISBN 4-8296-8201-9, France Shoin)
- Ninpō Midare Karakuri! (忍法乱れからくり!, March 2002, ISBN 4-8296-7403-2, France Shoin)
- Shiritsu Dengeki Jogakuin Seifuku Zukan (私立電撃女学院制服図鑑, February 2004, ISBN 4-8402-2599-0, Media Works)
