= Morishige =

Japanese manga artist duo

Morishige (もりしげ; born in Ibaraki Prefecture, Japan) was the penname of a husband-and-wife manga artist duo. Under the name Rondoberu, they made their debut in 1996 with Osawagase Debirun (おさわがせ悪魔っ娘（デビルン）), published in the Tsukasa Shobō magazine Comic Ichiban. Morishige is most well known as the creator of Hanaukyo Maid Team and Koi Koi Seven, both of which have been adapted into various anime series.

On July 3, 2020, Akita Shoten announced that one of the members of Morishige had died on June 30, 2020.

== Works ==
- Fudanshizumu: Fudanshugi
- Hanaukyo Maid Team (14 volumes, Akita Shoten)
- Jūrin (蹂躙, Sakuranbō Shobō, August 1998, ISBN 4-7567-0731-9)
- Kodomo no Mori (Oakla Shuppan, January 1998, ISBN 4-87278-224-0)
  - Kodomo no Mori: Kanketsuhen (Oakla Shuppan, November 1999, ISBN 4-87278-485-5)
- Koi Koi Seven (9 volumes, Akita Shoten)
- Sakura Sakura (12 June 2012 to 12 September 2015 in Bessatsu Shōnen Magazine)
- Suzaku (Takeshobo) CANCELED
- Oshikake Maid no Shirayuki-san CANCELED
