= Hanaukyo Maid Team =

Japanese manga series

- Cover of the first volume of the manga

花右京メイド隊 (Hanaukyō Meido Tai)
- Genre: Harem
- Manga
- Written by: Morishige
- Published by: Akita Shoten
- English publisher: NA: Studio Ironcat
- Magazine: Monthly Shōnen Champion
- Original run: 2000 – 2006
- Volumes: 14
- Anime television series
- Directed by: Yasunori Ide
- Written by: Yasunori Ide
- Music by: Tamiya Terashima
- Studio: Daume
- Original network: WOWOW
- Original run: 8 April 2001 – 29 June 2001
- Episodes: 12
- Original video animation
- Directed by: Yasunori Ide
- Written by: Yasunori Ide
- Music by: Tamiya Terashima
- Studio: Daume
- Released: 9 September 2001 – 7 November 2001
- Episodes: 3
- Anime television series

Hanaukyo Maid Team: La Verite
- Directed by: Takuya Nonaka
- Produced by: Hiroyuki Ōshima; Hiroshi Ishida
- Written by: Jukki Hanada
- Music by: Michiru Ōshima
- Studio: Daume
- Licensed by: NA: Sentai Filmworks
- Original run: 4 April 2004 – 20 June 2004
- Episodes: 12

Hanaukyo Maid Team (Japanese: 花右京メイド隊, Hepburn: Hanaukyō Meido Tai; lit. "Hanaukyō Maid Corps") is a Japanese manga series created by Morishige.

Hanaukyo Maid Team is about a young boy, Taro Hanaukyo, who has inherited a vast family fortune and, more importantly, the hundreds of employees working at the family mansion. While dressed and referred to nominally as 'maids', there are discrete albeit sometimes unusual departments for most of the employees (including Defence, Science, Catering, etc.). Presumably the various extensive projects in the house pay for most of its expenses.

The original anime, which aired as part of the omnibus program Anime Complex, was cut short when the series ran into production issues. Continuity was later rebooted for the new series Hanaukyo Maid Team: La Verite (Hanaukyō Maid Tai – La Verite in Japan). Many of the early episodes mirror each other closely, with some variations. Both anime versions use the same voice actors.

The English La Verite anime was originally licensed by Geneon Entertainment in North America, but Sentai Filmworks acquired the license in 2016 after Geneon's license expired. Studio Ironcat licensed the manga in North America; Ironcat as of 2005 went out of business having only released the first three volumes of the manga in English. There are currently no plans for another company to pick up the license and release the remaining volumes.

== Characters ==
Taro Hanaukyo (花右京 太郎, Hanaukyō Tarō)
Voiced by: Yuki Kaida (甲斐田 ゆき), Yuri Lowenthal (English)
A short, quiet, patient and persuasive middle school boy who inherits his mysterious grandfather's home at the age of 14. A common source of humor is his dealing with the overeager work ethic of the maids. He is put off by fawning women. (In the original anime series, this was exaggerated into a near-allergic reaction to any contact with a woman except one.) He thinks of his maids as friends and family rather than servants, and treats them as such, much to the consternation of some. He is rather blatantly attracted to Mariel. His name is spelled as "Tarou Hanaukyo" in the first English volume of the manga. As a point of interest, Tarou is shown cosplaying as Mahoro from Mahoromatic, even saying her catchphrase 'I think all dirty thoughts are very bad'.
Mariel (マリエル, Marieru)
Voiced by: Rie Tanaka (田中 理恵), Karen Strassman (English)
Mariel is informally seen as the "head" maid of the house. She is essentially the "perfect" maid—attentive, polite, demure, intelligent, and beautiful. Her devotion is alluded to border on obsessiveness and becomes a major plot point later. (In the original anime series, she had purple hair rather than blue). She is eventually revealed to have been the product of Project: Blue Silent Bell, a genetic engineering project aimed at creating the ideal maid for Tarou. Her true feelings and emotions are buried underneath layers of emotional programming, and at the end of the series Tarou commits himself to bringing them out. (At any rate, her devotion to and affection for Tarou appear to be sincere, despite the programming.) As a point of interest, in one episode, Mariel is shown cosplaying as Chi from Chobits, who was also voiced by Rie Tanaka.
Ikuyo Suzuki (鈴木 イクヨ, Suzuki Ikuyo)
Voiced by: Moyu Arishima (有島 モユ)/Jessica Straus (English)
One of Taro's friends, a 17-year-old maid with thick glasses and often sporting a sly mischievous look. She is the head of the Technology Department, and specializes in mechanics and odd inventions, some of them blowing up or otherwise malfunctioning in rather hilarious ways. Rather oddly enough, she is also an otaku. In one episode rife with nods to other anime, she brings several other characters to the world-famous "Comic Market" ("Komiketto" for short in Japanese) in Tokyo with her self-made dōjinshi.
Konowe Tsurugi (剣 コノヱ, Tsurugi Konowe)
Voiced by: Akiko Hiramatsu (平松 晶子)/Michelle Ruff (English)
The 21-year-old head of the Security department, she wears a military uniform under her maid apron. She has a severe personality but usually has everyone's best interests at heart. She has a soft spot for dogs, one of the rare times she breaks her overserious visage. The "we" part of Konowe is actually the katakana character "we" (ヱ). She takes her job as both head of security and Taro's personal bodyguard very seriously, which initially causes tensions between her and Taro due to his seeming lack of caution. Later she learns to 'lighten up' but is still very protective of Taro.
Yashima Sanae (早苗 八島, Sanae Yashima)
Voiced by: Yukako Hayakawa (早川 由佳子)(original anime) and Akeno Watanabe (渡辺 明乃) (La Verite)/Kate Higgins (English)
A dark-skinned 15-year-old maid who serves as Konoe's adjutant, she originally appears in the first series (with a different hair color, lighter skin and no name). She becomes a fully fleshed out character in the later Hanaukyo Maid series. She specializes in hand-to-hand combat but unfortunately is rarely taken seriously by the other maids who she reprimands often. She also has to constantly correct other people, insisting that Sanae (typically a first name for girls) is her last name. While Konoe sees her as a pupil, Yashima herself is hopelessly and rather blatantly in love with Konoe. This often has her daydreaming up various lesbian fantasies with Konoe returning her feelings, resulting in rather embarrassing moments.
Cynthia Landlavizar (シンシア = ランドラヴィジャー, Shinshia Randoravijā) / Grace (グレース, Gurēsu)
Voiced by:Tomoko Kaneda (金田 朋子)/Sandy Fox (English)
A silent, 10-year-old blonde girl who was praised, exploited, and subsequently shunned for her genius. She developed another personality named 'Grace': a vocal, stubborn, and tougher personality to protect herself. They take turns at being 'aware' while the other 'sleeps', although they can speak to each other. It is later implied that this arrangement is physically detrimental, which is exacerbated by Grace's tendency to overwork. As Grace, she is in charge of the Computer Security department, and is in charge of Hanaukyo Mansion's cyber-heart, the MEMOL supercomputer.
Ryuuka Jihiou (慈悲王 リュウカ, Jihiō Ryūka)
Voiced by: Rieko Takahashi (高橋 理恵子)/Wendee Lee (English)
Would-be master of an equally wealthy rival house to the Hanaukyos, annoyed with the condition she would become master of her house if she married the head of the Hanaukyo family. She was even more enraged to find the current head to be a 'whiny midget,' but later grows to like him somewhat. She is a military fan and later strikes up an obsessive competition to beat Mariel and prove herself, to the point of joining the household as a maid, and eventually taking over the Physical Health Department. Her bluntness and short temper sometimes comes in handy. Naturally, Ryuuka's home seems to also have a vast staff, but of handsome men rather than cute maids.
Hokusai Hanaukyo (花右京 北斎, Hanaukyō Hokusai)
Voiced by: Jouji Yanami/Sean Roberts (English)
Taro's grandfather. He only appears twice in the later series, as a not-very-visible video image. He is the main villain of the series.
Lemon (れもん, Remon), Marron (まろん, Maron), and Melon (めろん, Meron)
Voiced by: Kozue Yoshizumi/Rebecca Forstadt (Lemon), Mai Kadowaki/Stephanie Sheh (Marron), and Yūya Yoshikawa (吉川由弥)/Kim Mai Guest (Melon)
Identical triplets who work for the Physical Health Department (お側御用隊, Osoba Goyou-tai). Because of their questionable imaginations, this usually consists of them attempting various lewd acts on Taro around and during bedtime, which he nonetheless seems to avoid (in the first anime his attempts to dodge them are much less successful, the easiest example being the three of them cornering him in bed at the end of the first episode. In the manga, he managed to escape, in the anime, one of the girls shuts off the light and three hearts pop up, and we hear Taro calling for help). One possible explanation for this is the fact that all three are rather blatantly in lust with him.
Note: In the original anime series, their differing uniform colors made them marginally more distinguishable from each other. They are known as Ichigo (いちご; Strawberry), Ringo (りんご; Apple), and Sango (さんご) in the original anime series. Ichigo is voiced by Hazuki Kagawa (香川 葉月), Ringo by Ema Kogure (小暮 英麻), and Sango by Yuki Watanabe (渡邉 由紀).

== Reboot ==
Hanaukyo Maid Team: La Verite is a remake of the series featuring the same studio with different production staff.

== Music ==
Original series
Opening Theme: "Hanaukyo Meido-tai no Uta" (花右京メイド隊の歌) by Rie Tanaka, Moyu Arishima, Tomoko Kaneda and Akiko Hiramatsu (as the Hanaukyo Maid Team)
Ending Theme: "Sanshoku no Himitsu" (三色の秘密; "Secret of the Three Colors") by Ema Kogure (as Ringo), Hazuki Kagawa (as Ichigo), and Yuki Watanabe (as Sango)
La Verite
Opening Theme: "Voice of Heart" by Rie Tanaka (as Mariel)†
Ending Theme: "Osewashimasu!" ("You Take Care of Yourself!") by Kozue Yoshizumi (Lemon), Mai Kadowaki (as Marron) and Yuuya Yoshikawa (as Melon)

† An instrumental version of "Voice of Heart" is also used as a background music for a series of travel guides produced by TV Tokyo and PROTX.
