= The Embalmer (manga) =

Japanese manga series and television drama

- Tokyopop edition of the first volume

死化粧師 (Shigeshōshi)
- Manga
- Written by: Mitsukazu Mihara
- Published by: Shodensha
- English publisher: NA / UK: Tokyopop (former)
- Magazine: Feel Young
- Original run: 2002 – 2013
- Volumes: 7
- Television drama
- Directed by: Masahiro Mori; Hideo Mizumura; Minoru Tamegai; Takeo Kakinuma
- Produced by: "Shigeshōshi" Production Committee
- Written by: Sumino Kawashima; Ayako Katō
- Original network: TV Tokyo; Aichi Television Broadcasting; TVQ Kyūshū
- Original run: October 5, 2007 – December 21, 2007
- Episodes: 12

The Embalmer (Japanese: 死化粧師, Hepburn: Shigeshōshi) is a manga series written and illustrated by Mitsukazu Mihara. It was serialized within the magazine Feel Young, and was collected into 7 volumes by Shodensha. The Embalmer was previously licensed for English release by Tokyopop, and four volumes have been released. The company Hanami has released the complete series in Poland. A 12-episode live-action drama adaption called Shigeshōshi was produced and ran on TV Tokyo, Aichi Television Broadcasting, and TVQ Kyūshū; it was later released in a boxset by the company VAP. Two CDs containing music from the series were released in November 2007. A 6-episode WEB show was produced as a spin-off, originally released on the TV Tokyo web page for Shigeshōshi and later as part of the Shigeshōshi boxset.

The Embalmer follows the life of Shinjyurou Mamiya, an embalmer in Japan. Traditionally, cremation is the usual technique reserved for the dead, and, as a result, Shinjyurou faces discrimination for his line of work. Shinjyurou also feels the need for warmth after his job, and constantly has sexual intercourse with women to fulfill his desire. However, he refuses to have a romantic relationship with Azuki, a woman he loves. The Embalmer separates each chapter into separate stories surrounding Shinjyurou's experiences as an embalmer and the effects these experiences have on his life. Mihara found inspiration to create the series after a friend died and she began to research embalming. The series has received relatively positive reviews from Western critics, and the first four volumes have sold cumulatively over 300,000 copies.

== Plot ==
When Shinjyurou was young, he lived on a military base with his mother, a Japanese woman named Nozomi, and his father, an American named Dudley. Dudley was an embalmer and lived under the belief that corpses were still people and deserved proper respect; however, Shinjyurou gradually began to dislike him, feeling that Dudley did not spend enough time with his family. After failing to be present when Nozomi died, Dudley fulfilled his promise to be with her in her final moments by embalming her; Shinjyurou witnessed the process, but remained in denial that Dudley had truly loved Nozomi. Though accepted into a medical school, Shinjyurou transferred to an embalming university in Pittsburgh after his father had died from stepping on a mine in the Middle East. Dudley had not been completely restored, and as a result, half of his face was missing.

Shinjyurou becomes roommates with a Chinese student named Chansoo "Chan" Lee, who had taken an interest in embalming, despite his parents' wishes. Shinjyurou has trouble at the university due to his lacking in English language skills, but with help from the dean, Susan Garret, he is able to graduate as the valedictorian. Shinjyurou later interns at an embalming agency in San Francisco under a man named Peter Rabbit, who shares the same principal as Dudley and talks to corpses while working. Shinjyurou eventually returns to Japan and meets a priest who allows him to practice in his church and gives the church to him, provided that he does not change the exterior. Shinjyurou develops feelings for the man's granddaughter, Azuki, and they grow closer. However, he refuses to become involved with her romantically, and sleeps with multiple women because he craves the feeling of warmth after he works. Shinjyurou works adamantly to make corpses retain their original, living appearance to allow relatives and friends to say a proper farewell. Through his work, Shinjyurou is also able to help others come to a better understanding about embalming and death.

=== Characters ===
Shinjyurou Mamiya

Principal cast members. From left to right: Renji, Wao, Azuki, Koyuki, Shinjyurou, Tsubaki, Urara

Shinjyurou Mamiya (間宮心十郎, Mamiya Shinjūrō) is a skilled embalmer and protagonist of the series, who has romantic feelings for Azuki. While living with Chan in America, Chan often asked if Shinjyurou could work on someone he loves; he finally decides that it is something he fears, and pledges to never embalm Azuki. He realizes the importance of giving farewells to actual bodies, which affects his views and his embalming. In the live-action series, Shinjyurou works as a janitor at a hospital, with only Renji and the hospital director knowing he is an embalmer to avoid discrimination. When a body is sent to be embalmed, Renji sends him a text message calling him to a church where he performs the embalming. Masato Wada portrayed Shinjyurou in the live-action drama.

Azuki Natsui

Azuki Natsui (夏井アズキ, Natsui Azuki) is the Shinjyurou's landlord and granddaughter of the man who gave his church to Shinjyurou. She denies any romantic feelings for Shinjyurou, but cares for and trusts him. Shinjyurou's embalming indirectly allowed Azuki to realize the importance of saying farewell while the deceased is still whole. After her cat, Tamala, was found dead, Azuki went into denial and refused to see him, against Shinjyurou's advice. Shortly after, the daughter of a woman embalmed by Shinjyurou visited and thanked him for allowing her to give a proper farewell and find closure. With this in mind, Azuki holds Tamala's body and mourns. In the live-action series, Azuki is a nurse who works at the hospital with several other nurses and Koyuki. She slowly begins to have feelings for Shinjyurou, and is the first of the nurses to find out that he is an embalmer. Shinohara Mai portrayed Azuki in the live-action drama.

Renji Kobayashi

Renji Kobayashi (小林恋路, Kobayashi Renji) is Shinjyurou's friend and the funeral coordinator. He first met Shinjyurou while they were both in medical school, after a student comments that others line up to copy Renji's notes. Renji reveals that he will take over his parents' mortuary, and that he feels grateful that his parents allowed him to choose his profession. In the live-action series, Renji offers people who have lost loved ones a chance to have a "magician" restore the deceased to their past appearance before death. He protects Shinjyurou's identity and is revealed to be a friend since school. Shugo Oshinari portrayed Renji in the live-action drama.

Shouko Koyuki

Shouko Koyuki (小雪宵子, Koyuki Shōko) is a doctor who falls in love with the hospital director that informed her about embalming and his principals as a doctor. After he is diagnosed with carcinoma, Koyuki proposes to him and plans to have him embalmed after his death. However, since he had never sent in the marriage certification forms and as no relative was present to give permission, he was not embalmed. In the live-action series, Koyuki is a no-nonsense doctor and is the first to learn of Shinjyurou's true profession. At first, she dislikes embalming but later realizes its importance when her fiancé, the hospital director, dies. She is portrayed by Sayuri Kokusho in the live-action drama.

Mitsuru Natsui

Mitsuru Natsui (夏井満, Natsui Mitsuru) is Azuki's hard-working brother. In the manga, he works at a confectionery company, developing candy. When they were younger, Azuki and Mitsuru's father died and Mitsuru promised to become a candy-maker and be Azuki's male role-model. He greatly dislikes Shinjyurou as a result of his protectiveness towards Azuki. In the live-action series, he is an energetic and comical street musician who is given a tip by Shinjyurou. When he meets him again, Mitsuru complains that the tip was only a penny. Shinjyurou proceeds to tell him that he gave him "Lincoln", a metaphor postulating that Mitsuru would go on to accomplish great things. Shinjyurou tells him they are now "brothers" and thereafter Mitsuru constantly shows up at his apartment, often with food. He later rents an apartment next to Shinjyurou so he can move away from Azuki, who is constantly scolding him about his future. In the live-action drama, Mitsuru is played by Igarashi Shunji.

== Production ==
The Embalmer was inspired by the death of a friend of Mihara. Due to the poor scheduling of the funeral, Mihara felt that she was not given the opportunity to give a proper farewell. The situation led Mihara to begin investigating embalming, and she at one point talked to an embalmer. She noted that she "couldn't help but be impressed by restoration techniques" used during the process. Mihara also commented that she felt embalming is "a technique well suited to Japan" because people "often have very little time" to say goodbye. Mihara considers The Embalmer her favorite work, along with Poison Princess (毒姫, Dokuhime).

== Media ==
=== Manga ===
Written and illustrated by Mitsukazu Mihara, The Embalmer was originally serialized in the Japanese Shodensha magazine Feel Young. The first four volumes were serialized between 2002 and 2005, and the series resumed in the January 2008 issue of Feel Young, released in December 2007. It went on hiatus again after the February 2010 issue, and returned in the January 2013 issue. The conclusion of the series came on April 8, 2013, with the released of the May 2013 issue of the magazine. The first tankōbon of The Embalmer was released in Japan by Shodensha on July 25, 2003, under the Feel Comics label, while the seventh and last was published on September 6, 2013. On July 26, 2005, Tokyopop confirmed the release of an English-language version of The Embalmer, and the first volume was later released on August 8, 2006. Currently, four volumes have been released in English, with the latest released on August 14, 2007. In August 2010, Tokyopop stated, via their Twitter account, that they are looking into other means of distributing the series, such as digitally or print on demand, citing poor sales and that retailers were refusing to stock it. In April 2011, Tokyopop announced that their North American branch would cease all publishing operations by May 31 and would release details on specific series within the following weeks. The Embalmer has also been licensed by the company Hanami for release in Poland under the title Balsamista; all volumes have been released.

==== Volume list ====
No.	Original release date	Original ISBN	North America release date	North America ISBN
1	July 25, 2003	4396763050	August 8, 2006	1-59816-646-8
Embalming 1: Sleeping Beauty; Embalming 2: The Old Man's Watch; Embalming 3: Narcissus; Embalming 4: A Love Without Embrace; Embalming 5: Sweets Memories
2	March 8, 2004	4396763174	December 12, 2006	1-59816-647-6
Embalming 6: The Road Home; Embalming 7: Liars; Embalming 8: Pandora's Box; Embalming 9: The Miracle of Nothing Happening; Embalming 10: The Freedom of Loneliness; Embalming 11: Match Made in Heaven
3	January 27, 2005	4396763514	April 10, 2007	1-59816-648-4
Embalming 12-14: Shinjyurou; Embalming 15-19: The Embalmer
4	December 8, 2005	4396763727	August 14, 2007	1-4278-0140-1
Embalming 20: Gate of Flowers; Embalming 21: Gothic Lolita Complex; Embalming 22: Sandcastle; Embalming 23: In Out of the Rain; Embalming 24: Unforgettable Bond; Embalming 25: A Rose that Never Dies
5	September 8, 2008	9784396764395	—	—
Embalming 26: Embalming 27: Embalming 28: Embalming 29: Embalming 30:
6	November 7, 2009	4396764766	—	—
7	September 6, 2013	4396764766	—	—

=== Live-action drama ===
Cover of the Shigeshōshi boxset featuring Masato Wada as Shinjyurou

Shodensha magazine Feel Young announced in its September 2008 issue that The Embalmer would be adapted into a 12-episode live-action drama called Shigeshōshi (死化粧師). The series was aired on TV Tokyo's Drama 24 segment on Friday nights, as well as Aichi Television Broadcasting and TVQ Kyūshū. Shigeshōshi ran from October 5, 2007, to December 21, 2007. The show began being broadcast again on July 1, 2009. The film used several props with American themes because the main character had studied at an American university; these included doughnut boxes and sneakers with American dollar and New York prints. Filming took place at various locations, including a church and a coast at Miura. Due to a typhoon, seaweed and driftwood had to be cleaned off the beach before shooting began. The song Key to My Heart (ココロの鍵, Kokoro no Kagi) by Yorico was Shigeshōshi's main theme, and Slide (スライド, Suraido) by Super Flying Boy was the opening theme.

Shigeshōshi was scripted by Sumino Kawashima and Ayako Katō, while Masahiro Mori, Hideo Mizumura, Minoru Tamegai, and Takeo Kakinuma directed episodes. It was produced by the "Shigeshōshi" Production Committee, while TV Tokyo and The icon both worked on production. Promotion was done by VAP. Two CD singles have been produced containing music from the series. Key to My Heart (ココロの鍵, Kokoro no Kagi), by Yorico, was released on November 14, 2007, under the record label EMI Music Japan. Slide (スライド, Suraido), containing music by the band Super Flying Boy, was released under the label Columbia Music Entertainment on November 28, 2007. VAP released a four-disc boxset of Shigeshōshi on February 27, 2008. The boxset also included an hour-long extra at the O Video Awards, as well as other videos showing press conferences, premiers, and behind-the-scenes footage.

A spin-off web series involving the nurses from the drama was released on October 15, 2007. It was made available to watch on TV Tokyo's Shigeshōshi page and is six episodes long. The episodes were later included in the Shigeshōshi boxset.

== Reception ==
The Embalmer has received fairly positive reviews from Western critics. Writing for Active Anime, Sandra Scholes gave the first volume a positive review. She praised the "crafting of the story", and noted that every story gives "insight into a particular character’s personality". Overall, she felt it was "original, interesting, gothic and touching" and that readers "will find [it] impressive". Leroy Douresseaux of Comic Book Bin rated the first volume with a 6/10, noting that "Mihara smartly makes the reader invest in the lives of the deceased and in the emotions and grieving of the loved ones" and recommending the series to "goth fans and readers looking for something way out there".

Popculture Shock's Katherine Dacey graded the series with an A. She commented that "each volume contains vivid, poignant scenarios that dramatize the very human need for closure when a loved one dies unexpectedly, showing us how personal tragedy leads to catharsis". Dacey also praised the art, saying that "highly stylized figures" and "empty backgrounds amplify her [Mihara's] characters’ shifting moods from despair to peaceful acceptance".

Melissa Harper of Anime News Network positively reviewed The Embalmer, grading the story with an A and art with a B; overall, Harper gave the first volume a B+. She praised the stories as "gripping" with detail and the art as "different and interesting"; however, Harper wrote that "the darkness of the art" made "some panels confusing", and criticised the "lack of development on main characters". Writing for Mania, Jarred Pine graded the first volume with a B+. Pine called the premise "refreshing" and "unique", though did comment that the main character's personality "might fall into the womanizing bishounen cliché a little bit", but that "his idiosyncrasies and quirky relationship makes him an interesting character to follow" nonetheless. Library Journal's Christine Gertz noted how Miharu uses The Embalmer to ask if embalming is "loving, dignified, or disreputable to invigorate temporarily the corpse for viewing", due to the feeling surrounding the practice. Gertz felt that while "it may disappoint readers looking for a gothic depiction of death and loss, since this series is her most realistic", others "interested in thanatology" could enjoy it.

Cumulatively, the first four volumes of The Embalmer have sold over 300,000 copies in Japan. Tokyopop, however, stated that their sales for the English volumes were "weak".
