= R.I.P.: Requiem in Phonybrian =

Japanese manga

- The English-language cover as published by Tokyopop in North America on September 5, 2006
- Genre: Horror, Drama, Supernatural
- Manga
- Written by: Mitsukazu Mihara
- Published by: Asuka Shinsha
- English publisher: NA: Tokyopop
- Original run: 1999 – 2000
- Volumes: 1

R.I.P.: Requiem in Phonybrian is a manga written and illustrated by Mitsukazu Mihara.

== Release ==
Written and illustrated by Mitsukazu Mihara, the chapters of R.I.P.: Requiem in Phonybrian were collected into one tankōbon volume and published in November 2000.

Tokyopop licensed the manga for an English-language release in North America, and published it on September 5, 2006.

== Reception ==
One reviewer described the manga as "[a]n excellent choice for fans of Mihara or Ai Yazawa or for manga/goth fans who want their religion thoughtful and though provoking" and commented that Mihara "tackles both suicide and religion with humor, sensitivity, and love." Connie of Slightly Biased Manga enjoyed the "funnier moments" of it and noted "plenty of dark and brooding from the Undertaker to make this one-shot gothic enough for those looking for something dark". Anime News Network's Melissa Harper praised the "[b]eautiful costumes and hairstyles" of the characters, but disliked the "thin story and an unlikeable main character". Mania Entertainment's Jarred Pine wrote:"With R.I.P., Mihara sets up yet another interesting premise for exploring issues with the dead and the complex, emotional ties between the afterlife and the living, but ultimately the story never cuts deeply enough due to compressed nature."
