= List of Sugar Sugar Rune episodes =

- Cover of the first DVD released by Pony Canyon
- No. of episodes: 51

Release
- Original network: TV Tokyo
- Original release: July 2, 2005 – June 24, 2006

Sugar Sugar Rune is a 2005 Japanese anime television series based on Moyoco Anno's award-winning manga series of the same name. The animated series was produced by Studio Pierrot under the direction of Matsushita Yukihiro and consists of fifty-one episodes. Scripts were composed by Reiko Yoshida while the musical score was supervised by Yasuharu Konishi. The series was first broadcast on TV Tokyo in Japan between July 2, 2005, and June 24, 2006.

Three pieces of theme music are used—one opening theme and two closing themes. The opening theme is "Crazy for Chocolat" (ショコラに夢中, Shokora ni Muchū) by Karia Nomoto. The closing theme for the first twenty-nine episodes is "The World Beyond the Moon" (月の向こうの世界, Tsuki no Mukō no Sekai) by Karia Nomoto and the last twenty episodes is "Date Date" (デート☆デート, Dēto Dēto) by the series starring voice actresses Marika Matsumoto and Juri Ibata.

== Episode list ==
No.	Title	Directed by	Written by	Original release date
1	"Chocolat, Hearts, and the Shooting Star"; Transliteration: "Choko to Hāto no Nagareboshi" (Japanese: チョコとハートの流れ星)	Matsushita Yukihiro	Reiko Yoshida	July 2, 2005
Young witches Chocolat Meilleure and Vanilla Mieux are chosen as compete to become the Magical World's next Queen. They're sent to the Human World, where they're to collect human "hearts"; crystallized emotions that can be used as money and energy. Whoever takes the most by the end shall be crowned Queen. As they arrive in the Human World, the girls are introduced to "Rockin Robin", a witch who uses his pop idol career to steal the hearts of women. His job is to guide them through their challenge and monitor their progress. The girls are enrolled at school. Both expect bold and feisty Chocolat to be the most popular, but are surprised to learn that human boys prefer timid, gentle girls like Vanilla. Chocolat encounters an icy boy named Pierre from the middle school division, and takes an instant dislike to him.
2	"The Love Battle Between Frog and Mouse"; Transliteration: "Kaeru to Nezumi no Rabu Batoru" (Japanese: かえるとねずみのラブバトル)	Chiaki Kon	Reiko Yoshida	July 9, 2005
To increase their chances of gaining hearts, the girls summon their familiars. Vanilla gets Blanca, a competitive and mean-spirited mouse, while Chocolat gets Duke, a lazy unhelpful frog, and the two quickly develop a rivalry. Meanwhile, the girls realize Pierre is the "prince" of the school, and his fanclub don't take kindly to Chocolat rebuffing him.
3	"Unscheduled Newspaper Club Interview"; Transliteration: "Shinbun-bu Totsugeki Intabyū" (Japanese: 新聞部とつげき☆インタビュー)	Takashi Yaba	Tomoko Konparu	July 16, 2005
Nishitani, a boy who runs the school newspaper, develops a crush on Chocolat, giving him an Orange heart. Chocolat is ecstatic, but every time she talks to him she forgets to take it! Nishitani decides to make the next issue about her, leading the rest of the newspaper club to call him selfish and quit. Chocolat finally captures his heart, just as it changes from Orange to Rose. To show her gratitude, Chocolat uses her magic to give Nishitani an interesting story for the next issue, and the club forgives him.
4	"The Magic Lipstick Hints of Love"; Transliteration: "Mahō no Rippu wa Koi no Yokan" (Japanese: 魔法のリップは恋の予感)	Kunitoshi Okajima	Natsuko Takahashi	July 23, 2005
The class is putting on a production of Romeo and Juliet, with bossy class representative Manabe as the director. Chocolat thinks the world would be better if everyone was as honest about their feelings as she and Manabe are, so she orders a magical "lipstick of truth" from a catalogue. On opening day the girl playing Juliet comes down with a fever, and Manabe is the only one who knows the lines well enough to replace her. But she's too nervous about pretending to love Romeo, when she really does love the boy playing him! Chocolat uses the lipstick on Manabe, who finally confesses her feelings.
5	"Crazy Nervous! Home Visit"; Transliteration: "Dokidoki Harahara! Katei Hōmon" (Japanese: ドキドキハラハラ!家庭訪問)	Akira Shimizu	Saki Hasemi	July 30, 2005
Chocolat and Vanilla's teacher decides it's time to give the girls a home visit, motivated mostly by her wanting to see their "father" Rocking Robin again. Robin is called away to a photoshoot at the last minute, leaving Chocolat and Vanilla to make sure the visit runs smoothly and their teacher doesn't see any magic in the house.
6	"Aim for the Heart! Fencing for Love"; Transliteration: "Hāto o Nerae! Koi no Fenshingu" (Japanese: ハートをねらえ!恋のフェンシング)	Yasuyuki Shinozaki	Mamiko Ikeda	August 6, 2005
After witnessing a famous fencing-witch capturing hundreds hearts for winning a match, Chocolat decides to join the school's fencing team, in order to earn hearts of her own. But it turns out Pierre is the captain, and he'll only let her join if she can score a point against him in a match. If she wins, he'll even give her a kiss. Chocolat loses, but her determination leads her classmates to admire her, and she captures a few hearts anyway. Pierre offers to still give her the kiss, but Chocolat declines, saying she'll take it when she beats him fair and square.
7	"Chocolat Lost Her Qualifications as a Queen Candidate!?"; Transliteration: "Shokora, Joō Kōho Shikkaku!?" (Japanese: ショコラ、女王候補失格!?)	Chiaki Kon	Tomoko Konparu	August 13, 2005
Blanca badmouths Chocolat's deceased mother Cinnamon, leading Chocolat to wonder what kind of person her mother was. She decides to secretly journey back to the Magical World to find out more about her, having forgot that a Queen Candidate can be disqualified if she leaves the Human World without her examiner's permission. She's caught, and a hearing is called to decide Chocolat's fate. Just as she's about to be disqualified, Vanilla arrives and says she should be disqualified for leaving the Human World without Robin's permission as well. The council decide to give both girls another chance. Queen Candy tells Chocolat about what a wonderful person her mother was, and gives her a diary Cinnamon intended Chocolat to have when she grew up. However, there's no key and the diary cannot be unlocked with magic, leaving its contents a mystery.
8	"The Vacation Date of a Lady"; Transliteration: "Redi-na Kibun no Bakansu Dēto" (Japanese: レディな気分のバカンスデート)	Hiroaki Tomita	Reiko Yoshida	August 20, 2005
Pierre invites Chocolat and Vanilla on a trip to his villa, along with his fanclub. Chocolat agrees, intending to capture Pierre's heart while there, but begins to feel childish after spending some time around him and the club. She orders a pair of heels from the magic catalogue that can change the wearer's age, hoping to get Pierre's attention as an adult. While on a date with him in her disguise, Chocolat realizes the magic hasn't made her any less of a child on the inside. At the end of the trip, Vanilla notices Chocolat's heart turning Orange around Pierre, and fanclub president Yurika's black as she watches them.
9	"A Green Heart Present"; Transliteration: "Midori no Hāto ga Kuretamono" (Japanese: 緑のハートがくれたもの)	Masayuki Matsumoto	Natsuko Takahashi	August 27, 2005
Chocolat and Vanilla are asked to take the day's homework to their classmate Akira, who's off with a cold. When they get there they discover he's not ill, but skipped school to search for his missing dog Hiroshi. Chocolat organizes a search party, and, with the help of some magic, eventually locates Hiroshi, who was waiting at the harbour for Akira's father's boat to come in. Akira thanks Chocolat for her help, and his heart turns Green with friendship. Chocolat takes it, and muses that she appreciates it more than any other heart she's collected so far.
10	"Learn from Robin! Love-Love Mission"; Transliteration: "Robin ni Manabe! Rabu-Rabu Daisakusen" (Japanese: ロビンに学べ!ラブラブ大作戦)	Kunitoshi Okajima	Mamiko Ikeda	September 3, 2005
Chocolat and Vanilla secretly follow Robin while he films a commercial, hoping they can study his heart-catching tactics and use them to catch some of their own.
11	"More Important than Love!? Friendship Magic"; Transliteration: "Koi Yori Taisetsu!? Yūjō Mahō" (Japanese: 恋より大切!?友情魔法)	Akira Shimizu	Miho Maruo	September 10, 2005
Vanilla is so popular with the boys that Shiratori from her class requests her help in getting a middle school boy to notice her. Vanilla is happy to help out a new friend, but doesn't realize the boy prefers her to Shiratori!
12	"Chocolat Turns Into a Cat!?"; Transliteration: "Shokora, Neko ni Naru!?" (Japanese: ショコラ、ネコになる!?)	Yasuyuki Shinozaki	Saki Hasemi	September 17, 2005
After discovering most people find cats cute, Chocolat decides to turn herself into a cat in order to gain hearts. However, she accidentally loses her pendant and can't change back without it. Chocolat eventually finds it, but it falls into a river and she dearly drowns going after it. She's rescued by Pierre and brought to his home, where he cleans her up and gives her a kiss on the forehead. She escapes and finally changes back.
13	"A Brilliant Heart! The Queen Candidate Test"; Transliteration: "Kagayake Hāto! Joō Kōho Shiken" (Japanese: 輝けハート!女王候補試験)	Chiaki Kon	Reiko Yoshida	September 24, 2005
It's time for the midterm exam for the Queen Candidates. For one day only, they'll be able to collect special Rainbow hearts from other girls. Chocolat, who's always been more popular with human girls than boys, sees this as a good chance to catch up to Vanilla, and holds a "Sugar Rune Festival" using magic at their house, quickly taking the lead. At the festival, Chocolat thought the girls loved something scary, like the magical world. The girls enter the festival, shocked and scared. Vanilla tells Chocolat to change her theme from a scary, haunted festival to a cute, adorable theme. While Mont blanc is checking their écurés from the girl's heart, Chocolat helps Vanilla earn her own Rainbow hearts by getting the girls to try her delicious cooking. Both girls pass, with Chocolat coming in first. As a reward, Queen Candy gives her a broom for flying. As Vanilla and Chocolat are leaving the Magical World, they glimpse Pierre pass in a flying carriage.
14	"The Magic-Using Transfer Students"; Transliteration: "Mahōtsukai no Tenkōsei" (Japanese: 魔法使いの転校生)	Masayuki Matsumoto	Reiko Yoshida	October 1, 2005
Chocolat's friends from the Magical World, Houx and Saule, are sent to live in the Human World and enrolled at the girls' school. Queen Candy has ordered them to protect the Queen Candidates from a mysterious evil she can sense drawing near. The boys have a hard time adjusting to the customes of the Human World. They take an instant disliking to Pierre instantly. Three boys are arguing and Pierre challenges the twins to a tennis match. The twins decide to accept his challenge and they cheat using magic, but lose.
15	"The Contrary Macaron Pandemonium!?"; Transliteration: "Abekobe Makaron de Daikonran!?" (Japanese: あべこべマカロンで大混乱!?)	Mitsutoshi Satō	Tomoko Konparu	October 8, 2005
Chocolat decides to purchase magical hair-care macarons. She shares them with Vanilla, but it's only after they both eat one that they realize Chocolat ordered "Topsy-Turvy" body-switching macarons by mistake.
16	"Chocola Becomes an Idol!"; Transliteration: "Shokora, Aidoru ni Naru!" (Japanese: ショコラ、アイドルになる!)	Kunitoshi Okajima	Miho Maruo	October 15, 2005
Chocolat suspects the lead actress Coco on the show "Magical Knights" is a witch, but the others don't believe her. The next day, they're invited on a tour of the studio where the show is filmed. Chocolat gets lost and bumps into Coco, who reveals her suspicions were correct. Coca lets Chocolat try on her character's costume, and noticing how similar they look under the mask and wig, decides to have Chocolat take her place for a day. Chocolat does a terrible job, due to not knowing any of the lines or stunts. Robin finds Coco and convinces her to come back before Chocolat is forced to reveal herself.
17	"Grandpa's Invasion! Dance of Love Showdown"; Transliteration: "Ojii Shūrai! Koi no Dansu Taiketsu" (Japanese: おじい襲来!恋のダンス対決)	Akira Shimizu	Mamiko Ikeda	October 22, 2005
Chocolat's grandfather decides to come for a visit. Chocolat and the others quickly get annoyed by his crazy antics: stealing Chocolat's bed, showing up at school, turning the bathroom into a sauna, and dragging them out for all night parties. When Chocolat demands Grandpa leave, he challenges her to a heart-collecting contest. If she wins, he will return to the Magical World, but if she loses, he moves in permanently. Though Chocolat manages to capture a lot of hearts, Grandpa wins. He then admits the contest was just to get Chocolat more motivated about collecting hearts, bids them farewell, and heads back to the Magical World.
18	"Super Scary! Halloween Test of Courage!?"; Transliteration: "Chō Kowa! Harowin Kimodameshi!?" (Japanese: 超こわ!ハロウィン肝試し!?)	Yasuyuki Shinozaki	Natsuko Takahashi	October 29, 2005
Chocolat offers to be the elementary representative on the school's Halloween party committee, not realizing the rest of the committee is the Pierre fanclub. To her surprise, club leader Yurika likes her idea for a Halloween test of courage. She asks Chocolat to come to her house after school to plan the event, and the two get to know each other. With the help of Chocolat and Vanilla's magic, the party is a huge success. Jealous of how well she and Yurika are getting along, the fanclub lock Chocolat in the school storage room. Pierre mysteriously appears inside. Looking for Chocolat, Yurika unlocks the door and sees the two together. Chocolat sees that Yurika has a Noir heart of jealousy, but is relieved to find their friendship hasn't changed.
19	"Familiar Blanca's Bite-Sized Love"; Transliteration: "Tsukaima Buranka no Chitchana Koi" (Japanese: 使い魔ブランカのちっちゃな恋)	Chiaki Kon	Genki Yoshimura	November 5, 2005
Blanca has suddenly taken an interest in cooking, and all her dishes are made using cheese. As Chocolat is walking home one day, she discovers why: Blanca has a crush on Yoshiyuki, the man who runs the cheese store. Chocolat begrudgingly agrees to keep her secret. When they all become sick of eating cheesy foods, Blanca decides to use a magic spell to disguise herself as human and get a part-time job at the cheese store, so she can continue to be around Yoshiyuki. She notices he always has such sad eyes and requests Chocolat to use her magic to find out why. Using a magic mirror, they see that Yoshiyuki's girlfriend Mizue is currently studying in Paris and he misses her terribly. Putting aside her own feelings, Blanca asks Chocolat to magically transport Yoshiyuki to Paris so he can reunite with Mizue.
20	"Chocola Pinch? Application for Lovely Witch"; Transliteration: "Shokora Pinchi? Kawaii Majo Shigan" (Japanese: ショコラピンチ?かわいい魔女志願)	Shōji Saeki	Miho Maruo	November 12, 2005
Chocolat is caught using magic by a little girl called Sophia, and now she's determined to make Chocolat teach her how to be a witch! Eventually Sophia admits she wants to use magic to bring back her lost teddybear, "Ku-chan." After learning it fell in the river and can't be rescued, Chocolat disguises herself as Ku-chan in order to give Sophia a goodbye from her toy.
21	"The Dreamy Magical Teacups"; Transliteration: "Mahō no Tī Kappu wa Yume Kibun" (Japanese: 魔法のティーカップは夢気分)	Masayuki Matsumoto	Saki Hasemi	November 19, 2005
Chocolat decides it would be fun to see what other people dream about, and purchases a magic teacup that allows you to do so when someone drinks from it. With the help of Vanilla, Houx, and Saule, she opens a mini-cafe in the school gardens in order to see as many dreams as possible. As they're closing up, Pierre arrives and requests some tea. Chocolat serves him with the dream cup, believing if she sees into his dreams she'll have a better chance of capturing his heart. Pierre's dreamscape is a frozen Wonderland, where he and Chocolat are the only two people in existence. They have fun skating together, but when Chocolat decides it's time to leave, Pierre won't let her. He's lonely, and wants Chocolat to stay forever. She's only freed when the others smash the dream cup. She wonders if Pierre is truly that lonely all the time.
22	"Chocolat & Vanilla: Triangle Relationship?"; Transliteration: "Shokora ando Banira: Koi no Sankaku Kankei?" (Japanese: ショコラ&バニラ 恋の三角関係?)	Kunitoshi Okajima	Reiko Yoshida	November 26, 2005
Chocolat decides to try targeting one boy at a time, hoping she'll capture more hearts that way. But Blanca and Vanilla have the same idea, and to make matters worse they go after the same boy too. The girls decide to make a competition out of trying to capture his heart. At first the studious middle schooler prefers Vanilla, but eventually warms up to Chocolat after she tries to impress him by getting her grades up. Both girls earn a Rose heart from the boy.
23	"Run Run! Friendship Relay"; Transliteration: "Hashire Hashire! Yūjō Rirē" (Japanese: 走れ走れ!友情リレー)	Akira Shimizu	Tomoko Konparu	December 3, 2005
The school is holding a sports festival, and Chocolat is on the girl's relay team, hoping it'll earn her some hearts. Chocolat's teammate Sakiko injures her leg, but she refuses to sit the relay out. Confused as to why, Chocolat and Vanilla magically transport themselves to Sakiko's house, where they discover she's moving shortly, due to her father being transferred at work, and this will be her last school race. Chocolat orders a pair of magical speedy running shoes for Sakiko, so she can be in the race without it hurting the team's chances. But as the relay's about to start she realizes she bought the pair meant for boys, making them useless. But through the team's determination they make it to 2nd place. Afterward, Sakiko finds out she's no longer moving and apologises for costing the team the relay, but Chocolat simply reminds her that means they can come in 1st next year.
24	"Bye-Bye, Heart-Shaped Hair Accessory"; Transliteration: "Bai-bai, Hāto no Kamikazari" (Japanese: バイバイ、ハートの髪飾り)	Yasuyuki Shinozaki	Natsuko Takahashi	December 10, 2005
Chocolat has got herself a heart-shaped hair clip, spiked with a little magic to bring out hearts in the boys, who soon become as tired as zombies because they keep getting drained by the power of the hair clip.
25	"Pierre's Secret, The Diary's Secret"; Transliteration: "Piēru no Himitsu, Techō no Himitsu" (Japanese: ピエールの秘密、手帳の秘密)	Akira Shimizu	Genki Yoshimura	December 17, 2005
Pierre asks Chocolat to have lunch with him. Robin tells the girls that Queen Candy believes there to be an Ogre at their school. They suspect it's Pierre, and that he's targeting Chocolat.
26	"Christmas is for Hearts of Love"; Transliteration: "Kurisumasu ni wa Koisuru Hāto" (Japanese: クリスマスには恋するハート)	Yūji Kumasawa	Miho Maruo	December 24, 2005
It's Christmas, and Vanilla and Chocolat are holding a party at their house. They discover their friend Mayu likes someone who may like her back, and take it upon themselves to get them together by the party's end.
27	"A Tiny Heart, Crimson Heart"; Transliteration: "Chiisana Hāto, Makkana Hāto" (Japanese: 小さなハート、まっ赤なハート)	Masayuki Matsumoto	Masahiro Ōkubo	January 7, 2006
Chocolat, Vanilla, Houx, and Saule are at a loss on how to spend New Year's Eve, since they're not allowed to go back to the Magical World. After a flying accident, they find themselves at Akira's house, where Akira's dad invites them to join in on their New Years activities. Akira's younger cousin Miharu, who's staying with them while his mother is away on a business trip, develops a crush on Chocolat. When his mother comes to pick him up, he refuses to leave without her. His heart turns Red and Chocolat finally collects it, ridding Miharu of his feelings for her.
28	"Danger! Aquarium Date"; Transliteration: "Abunai! Suizokukan Dēto" (Japanese: 危ない!水族館デート)	Matsushita Yukihiro	Tomoko Konparu	January 14, 2006
Pierre asks Chocolat out on a date to the aquarium. Chocolat sees this as a chance to discover Pierre's true identity and finally capture his heart, but Vanilla is worried Chocolat might lose her heart instead. While at the aquarium, Pierre and Chocolat encounter the fanclub, whose hearts turn Noir from jealousy. Pierre creates an invisible barrier around them all and takes the fanclub's hearts, but suffers no ill affects from doing so. He reveals he's an Ogre and has known Chocolat was a witch all along. Houx, Saule, Vanilla, and the familiars go to the aquarium in order to keep an eye on Chocolat, but cannot find her or Pierre, due to the barrier. As Pierre tries to take Chocolat's heart, she accidentally spills the bottle of protective perfume Vanilla gave her, which weakens the barrier enough for Duke, Saule, and Houx to jump through. Duke shouts Pierre's true name, stunning him long enough for them to escape with Chocolat, heart intact. As Chocolat angrily tells him that she won't fall in love with him ever again, Pierre feels a strange twinge of pain in his heart.
29	"Magical World Genesis, Secret of the Ogre"; Transliteration: "Makai Sōseiki, Oguru no Himitsu" (Japanese: 魔界創世記、オグルの秘密)	Akira Shimizu	Miho Maruo	January 21, 2006
Chocolat and Vanilla want to know more about Ogres, but Robin refuses to tell them. Chocolat believes they could find out in the Magical World, but if they go without Robin's permission they'll surely be disqualified this time. They then discover they've been invited to the wedding of their former teacher, giving them a reason to go. After the ceremony, Chocolat sneaks away and requests an audience with Queen Candy. Queen Candy explains that the Magical World was forged by seven mages. Glace, the only male, was husband to the other six. Over time they became jealous and no longer wished to share his affections, so they banded together to imprison him for eternity. His descendants were dubbed "Ogres" and banished to the outlands of the Magical World, partly justifying their hatred of the royals. Queen Candy says she wishes to reunite the two groups and have peace once more.
30	"Ogre's Declaration of War! Crisis of the Heart Factory"; Transliteration: "Oguru Sensen Fukoku! Hāto Kōjō Kiki Ippatsu" (Japanese: オグル宣戦布告!ハート工場危機一髪)	Yasuyuki Shinozaki	Reiko Yoshida	January 28, 2006
The Queen Candidates have another exam, this time held in the Magical World. They're sent to the factory where hearts are converted into energy, and made managers of competing teams of workers. Chocolat bosses around and overworks her team, leading them to go on strike. Pierre decides to send a dragon made of Noir energy to attack the factory, as a declaration of war. Houx and Saule manage to destroy it, but not before it damages parts of the factory and the heart supply. As the exam cannot continue, Queen Candy plans to postpone it, but Chocolat insists they end it using the current results, knowing this means Vanilla will win. As a reward, Vanilla is given her own broomstick. Meanwhile, Pierre's advisor suggests he find an Ogre Queen as part of the planned takeover of the Magical World.
31	"The Harassing Witch Waffle Makes Her Appearance!"; Transliteration: "Osawagase Majo Waffuru Tōjō!" (Japanese: お騒がせ魔女·ワッフル登場!)	Matsushita Yukihiro	Reiko Yoshida	February 4, 2006
A young witch called Waffle appears, claiming to have fallen in love with Houx after encountering him in the Magical World once. After Houx politely rejects her, she follows him to school. Seeing him confront Pierre about Chocolat, she surmises that Houx likes Chocolat, and believes if Chocolat were to go out with Pierre, she could comfort a heartbroken Houx and make him fall for her. Waffle secretly gives Chocolat a love potion that makes her fall in love with every boy she sees, and arranges for her and Pierre to meet. Pierre proposes that Chocolat become the Ogre's queen in order to have peace between them and the royals. When Waffle realizes Pierre is an Ogre, she gives Chocolat a spell to nullify the effects of the potion. Pierre flies away, and Chocolat wonders how much of her feelings were the love potion and how much were genuine.
32	"Chocolat, Desirious Thoughts of Chocolate"; Transliteration: "Shokora, Choko ni Kometa Omoi" (Japanese: ショコラ、チョコにこめた想い)	Mitsutoshi Satō	Genki Yoshimura	February 11, 2006
It's the day before Valentine's, and while all the other girls excitedly talk about who they're going to give chocolates to, Chocolat keeps thinking about Pierre. Meanwhile, the boys are having a competition to see who can get the most chocolates from girls. Chocolat decides to rid herself of her feelings for Pierre by using a magic recipe that'll place them in a chocolate heart. The next day she takes it to school, where the boys fight over who it's for, smashing it in the process. Annoyed, Chocolat uses magic to turn it into tiny chocolate stars for everyone to share. It tastes delicious, due to being filled with her feelings of love, and brings out Rose hearts in the boys for Chocolat to collect. As she's about to eat the last star she accidentally drops it out the window, where it falls into a passing Pierre's hand. He eats it, and Chocolat wonders why her feelings are still there.
33	"Heart of Friendship, Important Feelings"; Transliteration: "Yūjō no Hāto, Taisetsuna Omoi" (Japanese: 友情のハート、大切な想い)	Masayuki Matsumoto	Natsuko Takahashi	February 18, 2006
Chocolat's been depressed lately, because of Pierre, so Mimura from her class offers to take her to an amuesment park with a scary haunted house. When they get there, they find it's closed down. Chocolat uses magic to temporarily bring it to life, allowing them to play on the rides. When the magic disappears, Mimura believes he fell asleep on the bench outside the park and dreamed it all. Chocolat sees his heart is growing Green, but decides she treasures his friendship too much to take it.
34	"Chocolat and Vanilla and the Star of Dreams"; Transliteration: "Shokora to Banira to Yume no Hoshi" (Japanese: ショコラとバニラと夢の星)	Akira Shimizu	Miho Maruo	February 25, 2006
Waffle has made breakfast for Houx but he turns her down as her breakfast doesn't seem to be edible. After Chocolat insults her saying she is cute and looks like she is playing house with Houx, Waffle decides to try to make Chocolat young again, thinking that if Chocolat is younger than her, Houx will fall in love with her. However, the plan backfires as her nanny performs the wrong spell for the occasion and ends up letting Waffle see a childhood memory that Houx, Saule, Vanilla, and Chocolat share.
35	"Waffle Becomes a Queen!"; Transliteration: "Waffuru, Joō-sama ni Naru!" (Japanese: ワッフル、女王様になる!)	Yasuyuki Shinozaki	Tomoko Konparu	March 4, 2006
Waffle sees the magical delivery man and tries to buy an item to make Houx fall in love with her. As the delivery man leaves, Waffle chases after the man and picks up a magic crown that falls out from his motorcycle. As the effects are too powerful, the delivery man, Chocolat, Vanilla, Houx, Saule, and Nanny attempt to help but the defective crown has a mind of its own. Can they take the crown off of Waffle?
36	"Stop the Old Man! Nanny's Secret Mission"; Transliteration: "Ojii o Tomero! Bāya no Maruhi Daisakusen" (Japanese: おじいを止めろ!ばあやの㊙大作戦)	Nanako Shimazaki	Saki Hasemi	March 11, 2006
Chocolat's grandfather came back to the human world and invited Chocolat and the others to relax for a while. But Nanny is ticked off with her grandfather. So they made a plan to make him return to the magical world but in the middle of the date Nanny's magic couldn't handle anymore so she confront him and asked why he has to return in the human world. What did they realized of why grandfather came in the human world?
37	"The Black Heart and the Ogre's Trap"; Transliteration: "Kuroi Hāto to Oguru no Wana" (Japanese: 黒いハートとオグルの罠)	Yasuyuki Honda	Reiko Yoshida	March 18, 2006
Glacier, the royal guard, is sent to the Human World, having been given the task of discovering more about Ogre enemy by Queen Candy. Chocolat is kidnapped and taken to Pierre, who has a proposition for her: he'll help her become Queen of the Magical World, if she agrees to also become his Ogre Queen. Chocolat refuses and prepares to fight him, but he lets her go. Meanwhile, Pierre leads Glacier and Robin into a trap, but his pet cat helps them escape. With Chocolat having rejected his offer, Pierre decides to make Vanilla his Queen instead.
38	"Pierre's Temptation, the Broken Friendship"; Transliteration: "Piēru no Yūwaku, Hikisakareta Yūjō" (Japanese: ピエールの誘惑、引き裂かれた友情)	Hiromitsu Kanazawa	Genki Yoshimura	March 25, 2006
Chocolat is asked to run for Elementary School President by her friends. Vanilla, meanwhile, becomes increasingly lonely and paranoid that she's going to lose the crown to Chocolat. Pierre uses this to his advantage, convincing her that everyone wants Chocolat as queen and the entire Queen Candidacy was a ruse in order to look fair. He convinces her to also run for Elementary School President, with his support as Middle School President backing her up. Vanilla wins, and Pierre implies to Chocolat that the voting was rigged. Chocolat confronts Vanilla about this, who's heartbroken that her best friend would believe she cheated. Before running off, Vanilla says she refuses to let Chocolat be queen.
39	"Birth, Queen of Ogre"; Transliteration: "Tanjō, Oguru no Kuīn" (Japanese: 誕生、 オグルのクイーン)	Matsushita Yukihiro	Miho Maruo	April 1, 2006
Pierre tells Vanilla he can help her become the Magical World's Queen, but only if she also agrees to be his Ogre Queen as well. She agrees, and allows him to place a Noir heart inside her, turning her into an Ogre. Chocolat tries to save her, but Vanilla and Pierre's dark magic is too powerful. Robin tells Chocolat that in spite of being an Ogre now, Vanilla is still a Queen Candidate, and Chocolat must not lose to her, or else the Magical World will fall into the Ogres' hands.
40	"Needle of Envy"; Transliteration: "Shitto no Kuroi Hari" (Japanese: 嫉妬の黒い針)	Masayuki Matsumoto	Natsuko Takahashi	April 8, 2006
Chocolat begins seeing a boy from another school. Vanilla casts a spell to turn his Rose heart Noir, making him jealous and possessive. Chocolat is at a loss for how to save him, as attempting to collect a Noir heart can kill a regular witch.
41	"Showdown with Vanila! The Secret Spice"; Transliteration: "Banira to Taiketsu! Himitsu no Supaisu" (Japanese: バニラと対決!秘密のスパイス)	Akira Shimizu	Mamiko Ikeda	April 15, 2006
Chocolat gives Vanila some berries from a plant which Vanila loved. Will Vanilla return to normal? Or will it make her worse? Pierre's servant enters the school and gives out a potion that makes food more delicious, making all the people that have the potion have a noir heart.
42	"Chocolat and Pierre's Adventure"; Transliteration: "Shokora Piēru, Futari Kiri no Bōken" (Japanese: ショコラ·ピエール、ふたりきりの冒険)	Mitsutoshi Satō	Reiko Yoshida	April 22, 2006
Chocolat and the whole class are invited by Vanilla to a magic ocean after Vanilla and Chocolat decide to compete for a boy's heart. Chocolat saves Vanilla from drowning, but then starts sinking herself. Pierre, being the only one to notice, jumps into the ocean to save her. The two of them get trapped alone in an underwater cave. Pierre then becomes confused over his feelings for Chocolat. Is it love? Will Chocolat fall back in love with Pierre now that he isn't cold? Will they escape? They enter a space of memories and discover they knew each other in the past?
43	"Invitation to the Night of Walpurgis"; Transliteration: "Varupurugisu no Yoru e no Shōtai" (Japanese: ヴァルプルギスの夜への招待)	Nanako Shimazaki	Masahiro Ōkubo	April 29, 2006
Chocolat is invited to the Walpurgus festival held for the magical community of the human world. Pierre and Vanila are there too. But the Ogre faction breaks the wards to the occasion – will war be close at hand? And some mystery guy saves Chocolat once again.
44	"Message from Mama"; Transliteration: "Mama kara no Messēji" (Japanese: ママからのメッセージ)	Matsushita Yukihiro	Genki Yoshimura	May 6, 2006
Using a special treasure picked up from the mysterious witch, Chocolat's able to summon the key to her mama's diary, discovering the links between Cinnamon and Queen Candy as well the reason behind her death. Pierre's noir heart begins to falter, will he suppress his growing feelings for Chocolat?
45	"Pierre's Strategy, Vanilla's heart" Transliteration: "Piēru no Sakuryaku, Banira no Hāto" (Japanese: ピエールの策略、バニラのハート)	Yasuyuki Shinozaki	Miho Maruo	May 13, 2006
Pierre's statergy enables Vanila to collect more hearts which however causes her more pain. Chocolat, in desperation to help her friend, decides to seek the witch of Cocoa desert, whose existence was found on a note in her mother's diary. However, she lives on the edge of the Magical World...
46	"Witch of Cocoa Desert, Ombre"; Transliteration: "Kokoa Sabaku no Majo Anburu" (Japanese: ココア砂漠の魔女·アンブル)	Akira Shimizu	Mamiko Ikeda	May 20, 2006
Chocolat tries to find Ombre to save Vanilla. With the help of Duke, they reach Cocoa dessert. Suddenly Ombre's house appears. At first Ombre was hard to talk to but she finally agrees to help them. She tells Chocolat to find a flower called Mandragora and pick its petals. Chocolat finds the flower, but before she can get it, Pierre appears and tries to stop Chocolat. But ends up saving Chocolat from falling. After that, Waffle grabs hold the Mandragora making it almost scream. But with the help of Chocolat, they receive its petals and gives it to Ombre.
47	"Frozen Memories, Pierre's Past"; Transliteration: "Kōtta Kioku, Piēru no Kako" (Japanese: 凍った記憶、ピエールの過去)	Kenichi Ishikura	Tomoko Konparu	May 27, 2006
Still on the quest of helping Vanilla get rid of her black heart, Chocolat and her friends seek out the last ingredient to make a powerful magic. Together with her friends they seek out to find the silver berry. The search led them to Ginger Village where Chocolat used to play as a child. There she met two fimilar people who used to give her ginger cookies. It was there that the Ombre's dog they brought to smell the silver berry led them to the forest where the ogres live. There Chocolat saw Pierre and both want to remember that part in the forest, so they decided to use magic in order to see their forgotten past. What did they see?? Suddenly a group came and took Pierre and took him and made him have a noir heart into him which made him forget about his childhood and about Chocolat. The group froze the forest and all the mermory of it. After they saw the past, Chocolat realized that Pierre was just an ordinary magical kid and he too have two hearts. When she told Pierre about it, he did not believe her and flew away. By then the dog returned and led Chocolat and her friends to the silver berry which was trap in a cage of ice. The silver berry was the red berry that she and Pierre ate while they were children. They took it back to her mother's friend and the powerful magic to break the black heart from Vanilla was finally finished. They all decided to go home and Waffle decided to stay in the magical world and go back to her house and study to become like Chocolat someday.
48	"Noir and Tears of Friendship"; Transliteration: "Noāru to Yūjō no Namida" (Japanese: ノアールと友情の涙)	Mitsutoshi Satō	Reiko Yoshida	June 3, 2006
Chocolat goes to Pierre's house alone to rescue Vanilla as he realizes that he has feelings for her. Led by Pierre's cat, she finds Vanilla in a lot of pain. She then removes the noir heart from Vanilla and finds she has hurt Vanilla while being friends with her. Together with help from Pierre, Chocolat and Vanilla escape. But will Chocolat be intact from the power of noir heart? Afterward, Robin discovers that the noir heart chocolat picked up turned white. They discover that Chocolat has the power to purify noir hearts? Was Chocolat a Filtre just like her mother?
49	"Queen's Final Test, Begin!"; Transliteration: "Kuīn Saishū Shiken, Kaishi!" (Japanese: クイーン最終試験、開始!)	Akira Shimizu	Genki Yoshimura	June 10, 2006
The final test of the Queen selection starts! The test is to obtain a unicorn's horn. However, it is unapproachable unless the person has a kind heart and sincerity, then the white unicorn will appear. Approaching to the mountain where the unicorn lives, both of the girls met a boy with light hair, who takes care of the mountain. Pierre appears, but he doesn't have the heart to kill them at all. After fighting with his two hearts, he withdraws. The boy with light hair appears and scolded the girls for harming the mountain, admoishing the girls to leave as the unicorn would surely punish him for it. However, Chocolat insists to staying (Vanilla as well), willing to take what punishment the unicorn would impose. And the boy begins to glow...
50	"Question from the Unicorn, the Heart Being Tested"; Transliteration: "Yunikōn kara no Kadai, Tamesareru Kokoro" (Japanese: ユニコーンからの課題、試される心)	Masayuki Matsumoto	Natsuko Takahashi	June 17, 2006
Chocolat and Vanilla have to pass 3 tests by the unicorn before its willing to give them its horn. Eyes that can discern the truth, courage of heart against the unknown and the third test – which they probably don't have to take as the magical world may no longer exist... Pierre appears, no longer as himself, but as the King of Darkness – and he is here to reclaim both the magical and ogre worlds!
51	"Shining Heart! The Next Queen Selection"; Transliteration: "Kagayaku Hāto! Jiki Kūin Kettei" (Japanese: 輝くハート!次期女王決定)	Matsushita Yukihiro	Reiko Yoshida	June 24, 2006
Chocolat had purifies Pierre's heart when switching heart in the process. Pierre became good and all the curses had bend lifted. Glaze did not disappear, he has just gone since the weakest on him before. Vanilla wins of being the next queen, but she had refuses to take the crown, why? Chocolat and Vanilla wish to stay in the human world to study further, Queen Candy permits them to do so. Then Pierre and Chocolat get married in the Magical World when they had switched hearts before, making Chocolat the first queen of the Magical and Ogre worlds. Pierre still goes to the human world and collects pink and orange hearts.
