= The Diary of Ochibi-san =

Japanese manga series

- Cover of The Diary of Ochibi-san volume 1 by Asahi Shimbun Publishing

オチビサン (Ochibi-san)
- Genre: Slice of life
- Manga
- Written by: Moyoco Anno
- Published by: Asahi Shimbun Publishing
- English publisher: Crunchyroll Manga (digital); Azuki (digital)
- Magazine: The Asahi Shimbun (April 2007–March 2014); Aera (April 28, 2014–December 16, 2019)
- Original run: April 2007 – December 16, 2019
- Volumes: 10
- Other book

Ochibi-san no Himitsu no wa Rappa
- Written by: Motoko Matsuda
- Illustrated by: Moyoco Anno
- Published by: Kodansha
- Published: May 28, 2014
- Volumes: 1
- Original net animation
- Directed by: Masashi Kawamura
- Produced by: Yohei Sadoshima (executive); Sachie Aihara
- Music by: Kenjiro Matsuo; Yuichi Nakamura
- Studio: Studio Khara; dwarf
- Released: April 20, 2015
- Runtime: 7 minutes
- Anime television series
- Directed by: Daisuke Onizuka; Shogo Tsurii
- Written by: Studio Khara
- Music by: Satoru Kōsaki
- Studio: Studio Khara
- Licensed by: SA / SEA: Medialink
- Original network: NHK General TV
- Original run: October 8, 2023 – March 31, 2024
- Episodes: 24

The Diary of Ochibi-san (オチビサン, Ochibi-san) is a Japanese manga series written and illustrated by Moyoco Anno. The series was serialized in The Asahi Shimbun newspaper from April 2007 to March 2014, and it moved to the Aera magazine, where it was serialized from April 2014 to December 2019. It was compiled into ten tankōbon volumes by Asahi Shimbun Publishing from August 2008 to June 2021. The series is published digitally in English by Crunchyroll Manga and Azuki. An anime television series adaptation produced by Studio Khara aired from October 2023 to March 2024.

== Characters ==
Ochibi-san (オチビサン)
Voiced by: Manami Hanawa
Ozeni (ナゼニ)
Voiced by: Nobuhiko Okamoto
Pankui (パンくい)
Voiced by: Shiori Izawa
Ojii (おじい)
Voiced by: Chafurin
Shiroppoi (シロッポイ)
Voiced by: Misaki Kuno
Jack (ジャック, Jakku)
Voiced by: Hiroki Gotō
Akame-chan (アカメちゃん)
Voiced by: Yui Ogura
Hebi-kun (ヘビくん)
Voiced by: Kōsuke Echigoya

== Media ==
=== Manga ===
Written and illustrated by Moyoco Anno, The Diary of Ochibi-san was originally published in The Asahi Shimbun newspaper from April 2007 to March 2014. It later moved to Asahi Shimbun's Aera magazine where it continued from April 28, 2014, to December 16, 2019. In March 2014, Crunchyroll Manga began releasing the series digitally in English. In July 2023, Azuki also licensed the series for a digital English release.

No.	Release date	ISBN
1	August 20, 2008	978-4-02-250464-7
2	August 7, 2009	978-4-02-250625-2
3	August 6, 2010	978-4-02-250772-3
4	August 19, 2011	978-4-02-250888-1
5	December 20, 2012	978-4-02-251005-1
6	January 21, 2014	978-4-02-251130-0
7	November 20, 2014	978-4-02-251233-8
8	September 7, 2016	978- 4-02-251385-4
9	July 5, 2019	978-4-02-251629-9
10	June 18, 2021	978-4-02-251690-9

=== Anime ===
A short stop-motion anime adaptation was released online on April 20, 2015, for the Japan Animator Expo project. The short was directed and crowdfunded by Masashi Kawamura and animated by Studio Khara and dwarf.

An anime television series adaptation was announced on September 8, 2023. The series is animated by Studio Khara and directed by Daisuke Onizuka and Shogo Tsurii, with Khara writing and supervising the scripts and Satoru Kōsaki composing the music. It aired on NHK General TV from October 8, 2023, to March 31, 2024, and ran for 24 five-minute episodes. Naotarō Moriyama performed the theme song "Romantic" (ロマンティーク). Medialink licensed the series in Asia-Pacific, and made the series available on YouTube via Ani-One Asia.

=== Other ===
A picture book based on the series, titled Ochibi-san no Himitsu no wa Rappa, was published by Kodansha on May 28, 2014. It was illustrated by Anno and written by Motoko Matsuda.
