= In Clothes Called Fat =

Manga

- Cover of the first Japanese edition of In Clothes Called Fat

脂肪と言う名の服を着て (Shibō to Iu Nano Fuku o Kite)
- Genre: Drama
- Manga
- Written by: Moyoco Anno
- Published by: Shufu-to-Seikatsu Sha; Shodensha; Bungeishunjū
- English publisher: Vertical
- Magazine: Weekly Josei; Young Berry
- Original run: 1996 – 1997
- Volumes: 1

In Clothes Called Fat (Japanese: 脂肪と言う名の服を着て, Hepburn: Shibō to Iu Nano Fuku o Kite) is a Japanese drama josei manga written and illustrated by Moyoco Anno and serialized on Shufu-to-Seikatsu Sha's Weekly Josei magazine. A compilation volume was released on November 15, 1997. It was published in English by Vertical and in French by Kana.

== Characters ==
- Noko Hanazawa (花沢 のこ Hanazawa Noko) - An overweight office lady resorts to eating to alleviate stress. After suffering repeated abuses at work and the revelation that her long-time boyfriend is cheating on her with Mayumi, Noko begins dieting out of the belief that becoming thin will make her prettier and happier. She winds up developing bulimia nervosa.
- Mayumi Tachibana (橘 マユミ Tachibana Mayumi) - One of Noko's co-workers, a sadistic woman who enjoys hurting people she considers ugly, especially Noko and Tabata. She begins an affair with Saito just to make Noko suffer more. When Noko is transferred to another department after Mayumi sets her up, Mayumi becomes irritable with not being able to bully Noko and begins bullying her other co-workers with less satisfaction.
- Toshihiko Saito (斉藤 利彦 Saitō Toshihiko) - Noko's boyfriend since high school, who has only stayed with Noko because she's fat and her weak will is comforting to him. He fears strong-willed and confident women like his mother, so he begins pushing Noko away when she tries to lose weight. They eventually break-up and he marries a fat woman with a mild personality.

== Reception ==
It was nominated for the Angoulême Essential Awards at the Angoulême International Comics Festival. The series was nominated for an Eisner Award for the "Best U.S. Edition of International Material—Asia" in 2015. On Anime News Network, Rebecca Silverman gave it an overall grade of B+, calling it "a grim yet fascinating look into the life of someone suffering from a disorder and never really getting the help she needs". On manga-news.com, the staff gave it a grade of 15 out of 20. On Manga Sanctuary, the staff gave it a grade of 7 out of 10.
