= Takatoshi Kaneko =

Japanese actor

- 金子貴俊
- Born: January 17, 1978 (age 48); Meguro-ku, Tokyo, Japan
- Occupation: Actor
- Years active: 2001–present

Takatoshi Kaneko (金子貴俊; born 17 January 1978) is a Japanese actor. He made his debut in the popular 2001 film Waterboys.

== Selected filmography ==
- Azumi (2003)
- Pretty Woman (2003)
- Kumiso (2002)
- Jisatsu Saakuru a.k.a. Suicide Circle (2002)
- Hikari no ame a.k.a. Rain of Light (2001)
- Waterboys (2001)
- Dōbutsu no Mori (film) (2006), the film adaptation of the Animal Crossing video game series.

== Television ==
- Haruka 17 (2005)
- Bitworld (2007-)
