= Flowers & Bees =

Japanese manga series

- First tankōbon volume cover

花とみつばち (Hana to Mitsubachi)
- Genre: Coming-of-age; Romantic comedy
- Manga
- Written by: Moyoco Anno
- Published by: Kodansha
- English publisher: NA: Viz Media
- Magazine: Weekly Young Magazine
- Original run: 1999 – 2003
- Volumes: 7

Flowers & Bees (Japanese: 花とみつばち, Hepburn: Hana to Mitsubachi) is a Japanese manga series written and illustrated by Moyoco Anno. It was serialized in Kodansha's seinen manga magazine Weekly Young Magazine from 1999 to 2003, with its chapters collected in seven tankōbon volumes.

== Publication ==
Written and illustrated by Moyoco Anno, Flowers & Bees was serialized in Kodansha's seinen manga magazine Weekly Young Magazine from 1999 to 2003. Kodansha collected its chapters in seven tankōbon volumes, released from April 6, 2000, to November 6, 2003.

In North America, the manga was licensed for English release by Viz Media. The volumes were published from October 1, 2003, to May 10, 2005.
