= Hataraki Man =

Japanese manga series and its adaptations

- First tankōbon volume cover, featuring Hiroko Matsukata

働きマン
- Genre: Drama, slice of life
- Manga
- Written by: Moyoco Anno
- Published by: Kodansha
- Magazine: Morning
- Original run: March 2004 – March 2008 (on hiatus)
- Volumes: 5
- Anime television series
- Directed by: Katsumi Ono
- Music by: Yugo Kanno
- Studio: Gallop
- Licensed by: NA: Maiden Japan
- Original network: Fuji TV (Noitamina)
- Original run: October 13, 2006 – December 22, 2006
- Episodes: 11
- Television drama
- Directed by: Nagumo Seichi; Sakuma Noriko
- Original network: Nippon TV
- Original run: October 10, 2007 – December 19, 2007
- Episodes: 11
- icon

Hataraki Man (Japanese: 働きマン; lit. 'Working Man') is a Japanese manga series written and illustrated by Moyoco Anno. It was serialized in Kodansha's seinen manga magazine Morning from 2004 to 2008, before entering on indefinite hiatus. The story centers on 28-year-old Hiroko Matsukata, editor at the magazine Weekly Jidai. Talented and hard-working, Hiroko's colleagues refer to her as Hataraki Man (literally "working man") because of her dedication to her job. But despite her successes in the workplace, she struggles with moments of self-doubt and with the challenge of balancing life and career.

Hataraki Man was adapted into an anime television series broadcast from October to December 2006 and a drama that aired from October to December 2007. In North America, the anime series has been licensed by Maiden Japan.

== Plot ==
Hiroko Matsukata is a woman who works as editor at the magazine Weekly Jidai (週刊「JIDAI」, Shūkan Jidai). She puts all she has into her work, and is known as a strong, straightforward working woman, who can at will turn herself into Hataraki man (working man) mode. Despite Hiroko's success at work, her life lacks romance. Even though a hard worker, she would leave early anytime to go on a date. However, her boyfriend is an even bigger workaholic than Hiroko.

== Development ==
Anno has said that "Absolutely, women need a Man Switch", saying that more understanding is needed of male and female psychology in the workplace. She is critical of a "laziness" in modern Japanese culture, saying that "The traditional virtue of Japan was that people took everything very seriously. As those traditions have been eroded, the quality of Japanese work has been downgraded."

== Characters ==
Hiroko Matsukata (松方弘子, Matsukata Hiroko)
Voiced by: Rie Tanaka
Portrayed by: Miho Kanno
Hiroko is a 28-year-old woman dedicated to her job. She will put her entire life on hold (becoming the "Hataraki Man") in order to get her story written to a self-imposed, very high standard of perfection. Her ultimate goal is to own and publish her own magazine.
Maiko Kaji (梶舞子, Kaji Maiko)
Voiced by: Atsuko Tanaka
Portrayed by: Michiko Kichise
Maiko is an elegant woman who is revered (and very nearly worshiped) by the men at Jidai. She is typically very silent and somewhat aloof, but she does get her job done (even if she ignores more of the rules of etiquette of such things).
Akihisa Kobayashi (小林明久, Kobayashi Akihisa)
Voiced by: Yuji Ueda
Portrayed by: Yoshiyoshi Arakawa
Akihisa is a mild-mannered reporter in charge of the "food and porn" section of Jidai. He and Hiroko started working at the magazine around the same time. There is a connection between, although whether this is from similar work ethic, starting their jobs at the same time, or the fact that they are drinking buddies (always initiated by Hiroko) is up for debate.
Mayu Nagisa (渚マユ, Nagisa Mayu)
Voiced by: Misato Fukuen
Portrayed by: Aya Hirayama
Mayu's main goal in life is to write a work of fiction with her favorite author. She is a bit of a flake within the world of Jidai and is often reprimanded for that fact. She is one of Hiroko's closest office friends.
Kimio Narita (成田君男, Narita Kimio)
Voiced by: Kenyu Horiuchi
Portrayed by: Ikki Sawamura
Narita is the more active boss in the editing department, much to the dismay of the chief editor, Tatsuhiko (although he does not act offended but on occasion.) Narita is a man who knows when to be the boss and when to be the encouraging friend. While he is usually shown as being an amiable man who wants to help the other employees, he is not above yelling at the others to make sure they get their best work done and before deadline. It is never said explicitly one way or another where his sexual preference ultimately lies; but it is mentioned that Narita "doesn't like women".
Yumi Nogawa (野川由実, Nogawa Yumi)
Voiced by: Rumi Shishido
Yumi, one of the four women actually seen working within Jidai, is almost the complete opposite of Hiroko, if only in their approach to working within a "man's world". Yumi chose to embrace her "womanly" side instead of trying to run with the men. She is engaged to an unnamed man, although there are "hints" that her fiancé was the former boyfriend of coworker Maiko Kaji.
Fumiya Sugawara (菅原文哉, Sugawara Fumiya)
Voiced by: Kazuya Nakai
Portrayed by: Kanji Tsuda
Sugawara is more a paparazzo than a traditional reporter. He hunts down high scandal stories and then stakes them out to get the perfect picture. Unexpectedly, he has an inner calm that is expressed through his pleasure of sky photography; however, to the outside world he is a gruff man with a bit of a mean streak.
Kunio Tanaka (田中邦男, Tanaka Kunio)
Voiced by: Makoto Yasumura
Kunio is a man who feels that one's life should not be wasted completely on working. He gets his job done but, unlike Hiroko, he does not feel that one should devote their whole life to just work. While there are several people who clash with Hiroko throughout the series, Kunio is probably one of those that repeats the most, if only for their complete difference in work ethic.
Tatsuhiko Umemiya (梅宮龍彦, Umemiya Tatsuhiko)
Voiced by: Tomomichi Nishimura
Portrayed by: Masato Ibu
As the senior editor within the department, Tatsuhiko does not seem to do a whole lot. He is a rather laid back man and is often accused of being sexist towards the female characters. While he is very susceptible to flattery, Tatsuhiko also has his serious moments. There is a reason why he is the boss and when the stakes are raised, he is willing to step up and take responsibility.
Shinji Yamashiro (山城新二, Yamashiro Shinji)
Voiced by: Eiji Hanawa
Portrayed by: Hisashi Yoshizawa
Like Hiroko, Shinji works long hours. He also frequently travels on business, making it difficult for the two of them to spend time together. Shinji is not as successful in his business endeavors as Hiroko, however, and this leads to more problems in their relationship.

== Media ==
=== Manga ===
Written and illustrated by Moyoco Anno, Hataraki Man started its serialization in Kodansha's seinen manga magazine Morning in March 2004. The series entered on indefinite hiatus in March 2008 due to Anno's health. Before its hiatus, Kodansha collected the series' chapters in four tankōbon, released from November 22, 2004, to August 23, 2007. A fifth volume was released on June 27, 2024.

==== Volumes ====
No.	Release date	ISBN
1	November 22, 2004	978-4-06-328999-2
2	July 22, 2005	978-4-06-372453-0
3	October 6, 2006	978-4-06-372550-6
4	August 23, 2007	978-4-06-372626-8
5	June 27, 2024	978-4-06-372626-8

=== Anime ===
An eleven-episode anime television series adaptation, animated by studio Gallop, was broadcast on Fuji TV's Noitamina late night programming block from October 13 to December 22, 2006. Puffy performed the opening theme "Hataraku Otoko" (働く男; lit. 'Working Man'), while Chatmonchy performed the ending theme "Shangri-La" (シャングリラ, Shangurira).

In North America, the anime series was licensed by Maiden Japan in 2018. The entire series was released on Blu-ray on January 22, 2019.

==== Episodes ====
No.	Title	Original release date
1	"The Female Hataraki Man"; Transliteration: "Onna no Hataraki Man" (Japanese: 女の働きマン)	October 13, 2006
2	"Stake Out Man"; Transliteration: "Harikomi Man" (Japanese: 張り込みマン)	October 20, 2006
3	"Ramen Man"; Transliteration: "Rāmen Man" (Japanese: ラーメンマン)	October 27, 2006
4	"Error Man"; Transliteration: "Ayamari Man" (Japanese: あやまりマン)	November 3, 2006
5	"Turn Around Man"; Transliteration: "Furimuki Man" (Japanese: 振り向きマン)	November 10, 2006
6	"Princess Man"; Transliteration: "O-Himesama-n" (Japanese: お姫さマン)	November 17, 2006
7	"Fussy Man"; Transliteration: "Kodawari Man" (Japanese: こだわりマン)	November 24, 2006
8	"Reward Man"; Transliteration: "Mukuware Man" (Japanese: 報われマン)	December 1, 2006
9	"Full-Fledged Hataraki Man"; Transliteration: "Ichininmae no Hataraki Man" (Japanese: 一人前の働きマン)	December 8, 2006
10	"Non-working Man"; Transliteration: "Hatarakanai Man" (Japanese: 働かないマン)	December 15, 2006
11	"Even So, Hataraki Man"; Transliteration: "Soredemo Hataraki Man" (Japanese: それでも働きマン)	December 22, 2006

=== Drama ===
A television drama adaptation aired from October to December 2007.

== Reception ==
By June 2024, the manga had over 3.3 million copies in circulation. It was nominated for the tenth Tezuka Osamu Cultural Prize in 2006.

The realism of the series has been regarded as key to its popularity with readers facing the same issues in life.
