= Akifumi Miura =

Japanese actor (born 1981)

Akifumi Miura (三浦アキフミ, or 三浦哲郁; born 16 November 1981) is a Japanese actor. He made his debut in the 2001 film Waterboys.

== Selected filmography ==
2009 Tsubasa (TV series) 2009 Kansen rettô
2007 Beyond the Fence
2006 Chôshû Faibu
2006 Night Time Picnic
2005 Linda Linda Linda
2005 Germanium no yoru
2005 Tomie: Beginning
2004 Tsuki to Cherry
2004 Kurimu remon
2002 Jam Films ('Justice' segment)
2001 Waterboys
