= Daichi Banjō =

Japanese manga artist

- Born: Akinori Kidera (木寺 昭徳, Kidera Akinori); January 28, 1969 (age 57) Fukuoka Prefecture, Japan
- Areas: Manga artist, illustrator
- Notable works: Dan Doh!!
- Collaborators: Nobuhiro Sakata

Akinori Kidera (木寺 昭徳, Kidera Akinori; born January 28, 1969 in Fukuoka Prefecture, Japan), known under the pen name Daichi Banjō (万乗 大智, Banjō Daichi), is a Japanese manga artist. His most notable work was the sports manga Dan Doh!!, written by Nobuhiro Sakata, in which he was the illustrator.

== Biography ==
In 1991, Banjō won the 21st Shogakukan New Artist Award for "Feron 11" as well as an honorable mention for the "Fujiko Fujio Award". That same year, one of his works appeared in the CoroCoro Comic Summer Special. After graduating from Seinan Gakuin University, he worked as an assistant to Takashi Shiina. In 1992, he made his formal debut under the pen name "Daichi Banjō" with the short story "Puma" in a special issue of Shōnen Sunday. In 1995, he became the illustrator for the Dan Doh!! sports manga series written by Nobuhiro Sakata. The series ran from 1995 to 2000 on Weekly Shonen Jump for 29 tankōbon volumes and its sequels Dan Doh! Xi and Dan Doh! Next Generation ran in Shonen Sunday from 2000 to 2005 for 15 and 4 volumes, respectively. It was also adapted into an anime series. In 2006, he worked on the series Bushin which was serialized in Weekly Shonen Sunday. Other manga series include Mobile Suit Gundam: The Hunters in Black and Mobile Suit Gundam Aggressor.

In 2020, Banjō announced that he was diagnosed with cancer. He is undergoing cancer treatment as of October 14, 2026.

== Works ==
Title	Year	Notes	Refs
Dan Doh!	1995–2000	Illustrator, written by Nobuhiro Sakata. Serialized in Weekly Shonen Sunday; Published by Shogakukan in 29 volumes	
Dan Doh!! Xi	2000–03	Illustrator, written by Nobuhiro Sakata. Serialized in Shonen Sunday; Published by Shogakukan in 15 volumes	
Dan Doh!! ~ Next Generation	2004–05	Illustrator, written by Nobuhiro Sakata. Serialized in Shonen Sunday; Published by Shogakukan in 4 volumes	
Sairen (ja:サイレン 〜ETERNAL SIREN〜, Siren)	2005–06	screenplay. Serialized in Young Sunday Comics, Published in 1 volume	
Bushin (ja:武心 BUSHIN)	2006–07	Serialized in Shonen Sunday; Published by Shogakukan in 5 volumes	
An koro. Funabashi Wakamatsu 1-chōme wa uma yūsen (あんころ。船橋若松1丁目は馬優先)	2007–08	Serialized in Young Sunday Comics; Published in 5 volumes	
Gen'eishōnen (ja:幻影少年; Ghost Boy)	2009–11	Serialized in Shonen Sunday; Published by Shogakukan in 6 volumes	
Mobile Suit Gundam: The Hunters in Black (ja:機動戦士ガンダム 黒衣の狩人, Kidō Senshi Gundam: Kokui no Kariudo)	2013	Manga artist. Original story by Yatate Hajime and Tomino Yoshiyuki. Serialized in Shonen Sunday Super, Published in 1 volume	
Mobile Suit Gundam Aggressor (機動戦士ガンダム アグレッサー)	2014	Manga artist. Original story by Yatate Hajime and Tomino Yoshiyuki. Serialized in Shonen Sunday S Published by Shogakukan in 2 volumes	
Girishia shinwa (ギリシア神話; Greek Mythology)		Serialized in Shogakukan learning Manga World Masterpiece Museum; Published in 1 volume	
Chō henkan taisen moji bakeru G (超変換大戦もじバケるG)		Serialized in Colo Comics; Published in 3 volumes	
