= Dan Doh!! =

Japanese manga series

- First tankōbon volume cover, featuring Tadamichi Aoba
- Genre: Sports
- Manga
- Written by: Nobuhiro Sakata
- Illustrated by: Daichi Banjō
- Published by: Shogakukan
- Imprint: Shōnen Sunday Comics
- Magazine: Weekly Shōnen Sunday
- Original run: March 15, 1995 – June 21, 2000
- Volumes: 29
- Manga

Dan Doh! Xi
- Written by: Nobuhiro Sakata
- Illustrated by: Daichi Banjō
- Published by: Shogakukan
- Imprint: Shōnen Sunday Comics
- Magazine: Weekly Shōnen Sunday
- Original run: July 5, 2000 – April 9, 2003
- Volumes: 15
- Anime television series

Dandoh!
- Directed by: Hidetoshi Oomori
- Music by: Yoko Shimomura
- Studio: Tokyo Kids
- Licensed by: NA: Bandai Entertainment
- Original network: TXN (TV Tokyo)
- Original run: April 3, 2004 – September 25, 2004
- Episodes: 26
- Manga

Dan Doh! Next Generation
- Written by: Nobuhiro Sakata
- Illustrated by: Daichi Banjō
- Published by: Shogakukan
- Imprint: Shōnen Sunday Comics
- Magazine: Weekly Shōnen Sunday
- Original run: March 24, 2004 – December 1, 2004
- Volumes: 4
- icon

Dan Doh!! (stylized in all caps) is a Japanese sports manga series written by Nobuhiro Sakata and illustrated by Daichi Banjō. It was serialized in Shogakukan's shōnen manga magazine Weekly Shōnen Sunday from March 1995 to June 2000. It was followed by Dan Doh! Xi (serialized from July 2000 to April 2003) and Dan Doh! Next Generation (March to December 2004). Dan Doh!! was adapted into a 26-episode anime television series broadcast on TV Tokyo from April to September 2004.

== Plot ==
Dan Doh!! focuses on a fifth grader named Tadamichi Aoba also nicknamed Dandoh. Dandoh and his two friends are their baseball team's best players, but after an incident with their school principal, they are introduced to the world of golf. Dandoh and his friends are taught by a former professional golfer named Shinjō Mikiyasu, who believes that they can surpass even him. As Dandoh begins to play in tournaments, his friendly spirit, determination, and hard working and competitive attitude brings the best in the players around him and earns him many friends.

== Characters ==
Tadamichi Aoba (青葉弾道, Aoba Tadamichi)
Voiced by: Yū Kobayashi (Japanese); Chio Su Ping (English)
Tadamichi Aoba, also called Dandoh by his friends, was originally a talented baseball player with the ability to hit long-distance home runs. He is introduced to golf by his school's principal. Dandoh quits baseball and decides to play golf instead partly after hearing he could win 30 million yen in a tournament. He believes if he wins the money, his mother would come back after she left him, his older sister, and his father Shigemichi Aoba because of money problems. His nickname comes from an alternate pronunciation of his given name, the Japanese word dandō (弾道; lit. 'Trajectory').
Yuka Sunada (砂田優香, Sunada Yūka)
Voiced by: Aya Hirayama (Japanese); Denise Tan Shu Fen (English)
Yuka Sunada is Dandoh's friend who follows him to play golf. She constantly worries about Dandoh, but also gets excited after his accomplishments. Yuka's swinging pivot is firm, which allows her to keep her form when under pressure and even when being harassed during her first tournament game. She has a calm and kind personality. Yuka shows talent in golf like Aoba whom she falls in love with.
Kōhei Ooike (大池弘平, Ooike Kōhei)
Voiced by: Rie Ichita (Japanese); Mark Kaufmann (English)
Kōhei Ooike is Dandoh's friend who follows him to play golf. He also played baseball and could hit further than Dandoh. Along with his strength to hit the ball far, Kōhei excels in putting.
Shinjō Mikiyasu (新庄樹靖, Mikiyasu Shinjō)
Voiced by: Shigeru Nakahara (Japanese); Mark Kaufmann (English)
Shinjō Mikiyasu was a Japanese pro golfer who won a tournament over fictional pro golfer Jimmy McGray a year and seven months prior to the beginning of the story. His career came to an end after a car accident, which left him unable to swing a golf club. He envies Dandoh because he has good friends that back him up, thus agrees to teach Dandoh, Yuka, and Kōhei after they show him their determination and patience.

== Media ==
=== Manga ===
Written by Nobuhiro Sakata and illustrated by Daichi Banjō, Dan Doh!! was serialized in Shogakukan's Weekly Shōnen Sunday from March 15, 1995, to June 21, 2000. (Note: It started in the magazine's 15th issue of 1995 (with cover date March 29), released on March 15 of that same year; it finished in the magazine's 30th issue of 2000 (with cover date July 5), released on June 21 of that same year.) Shogakukan collected its chapters in 29 tankōbon volumes, published from September 18, 1995, to November 18, 2000.

The manga was followed by a sequel titled Dan Doh! Xi, serialized in Weekly Shōnen Sunday from July 5, 2000, to April 9, 2003. (Note: It started in the magazine's 32nd issue of 2000 (with cover date July 19), released on July 5 of that same year; it finished in the magazine's 19th issue of 2003 (with cover date April 23), released on April 9 of that same year.) Shogakukan collected its chapters in fifteen tankōbon volumes, released from December 18, 2000, to May 17, 2003.

A third series, Dan Doh! Next Generation (DAN DOH!! ネクストジェネレーション, Dandō Nekusuto Jenerēshon), was serialized in Weekly Shōnen Sunday from March 24 to December 1, 2004. (Note: It started in the magazine's 17th issue of 2004 (with cover date April 7), released on March 24 of that same year; it finished in the magazine's first issue of 2005 (with cover date December 15), released on December 1, 2004.) Shogakukan collected its chapters in four tankōbon volumes, released from July 16, 2004, to January 18, 2005.

=== Anime ===
Dan Doh!! was adapted into a 26-episode anime television series which was broadcast on TV Tokyo from April 3 to September 25, 2004.

Dan Doh!! was licensed for North American distribution by Bandai Entertainment, which they announced at Anime Expo 2004 when they wanted to establish a strong presence in the sports genre. The English dub was produced by Odex Pte Ltd., a Singapore-based anime licensor company.

==== Episodes ====
No.	Title	Original release date
1	"Dandoh's Dream!"; Transliteration: "Dandō no Yume!" (Japanese: ダンドーの夢！)	April 3, 2004
2	"The Championship"; Transliteration: "Senshuken" (Japanese: 選手権)	April 10, 2004
3	"Yuka"; Transliteration: "Yūka" (Japanese: 優香)	April 17, 2004
4	"Miss Shot"; Transliteration: "Misu Shotto" (Japanese: ミスショット)	April 24, 2004
5	"Smiley Ball"; Transliteration: "Niko Bōru" (Japanese: ニコボール)	May 1, 2004
6	"Yokota"; Transliteration: "Yokota" (Japanese: 横田)	May 8, 2004
7	"Final Round"; Transliteration: "Kesshō Raundo" (Japanese: 決勝ラウンド)	May 15, 2004
8	"Father"; Transliteration: "Chichi" (Japanese: 父)	May 22, 2004
9	"The 6-iron" Transliteration: "Rokuban Aian" (Japanese: 6番アイアン)	May 29, 2004
10	"Over the Valley"; Transliteration: "Tani Koe" (Japanese: 谷越え)	June 5, 2004
11	"Gathering of the Strong"; Transliteration: "Tsuyosha Tsudou" (Japanese: 強者つどう)	June 12, 2004
12	"The Only One in the World"; Transliteration: "Sekai de tada Ippon" (Japanese: 世界でただ一本)	June 19, 2004
13	"The Light That Reaches the Hearrt"; Transliteration: "Kokoro ni Todoku Hikari" (Japanese: 心に届く光)	June 26, 2004
14	"A Man to Man Duel"; Transliteration: "Otoko to Otoko no Kettō" (Japanese: 男と男の決闘)	July 3, 2004
15	"Disqualified"; Transliteration: "Shikkaku" (Japanese: 失格)	July 10, 2004
16	"To Hokkaido"; Transliteration: "Hokkaido e" (Japanese: 北海道へ)	July 17, 2004
17	"Caddie"; Transliteration: "Kyadī" (Japanese: キャディー)	July 24, 2004
18	"My Favorite Shot!"; Transliteration: "Daisukina Shotto!" (Japanese: 大好きなショット！)	July 31, 2004
19	"Challenge"; Transliteration: "Chōsen" (Japanese: 挑戦)	August 7, 2004
20	"Together We Are One"; Transliteration: "Futari de Hitori" (Japanese: 二人で一人)	August 14, 2004
21	"Faith"; Transliteration: "Shin'nen" (Japanese: 信念)	August 21, 2004
22	"Mr. Taku"; Transliteration: "Taku-san" (Japanese: 拓さん)	August 28, 2004
23	"A Test"; Transliteration: "Shiren" (Japanese: 試練)	September 4, 2004
24	"Birth of a Winner!"; Transliteration: "Shiyū kessu!" (Japanese: 雌雄决す！)	September 11, 2004
25	"Kazama"; Transliteration: "Kazama" (Japanese: 風間)	September 18, 2004
26	"Inside the Light"; Transliteration: "Hikari no Naka de" (Japanese: 光の中で)	September 25, 2004

==== Theme songs ====
Opening theme
"Going On" by Bullet 77
Ending themes
"Wild Flower: Hana ni Arashi no Tatoe ari" (WILD FLOWER ~花に嵐の喩えあり~) by Bullet 77 (episodes 1–13)
"Believe in Love" by Bullet 77 (episodes 14–25)
"Going On" by Bullet 77 (episode 26)
