= Aya Hirayama =

Japanese actress (born 1984)

- 平山 あや
- Born: 平山 綾 January 13, 1984 (age 42); Nasushiobara, Tochigi, Japan
- Education: Horikoshi High School
- Occupation: Actress
- Years active: 1999–present
- Height: 1.61 m (5 ft 3 1/2 in)
- Spouse: Mokomichi Hayami (m. 2019)

Aya Hirayama (平山 あや, Hirayama Aya; born January 13, 1984) is a Japanese actress who has appeared in various films including Waterboys (2001) and Lovers' Kiss (2003). Hirayama was born in Kuroiso, Tochigi, Japan, which is now part of Nasushiobara.

Aya made her acting debut in 1999 with Tengoku no Kiss, a Nippon Television drama, at the age of 15. Subsequently, she established herself as a television regular with appearances in many Japanese TV dramas. In 2001, Hirayama played significant parts in the television drama Fighting Girl and the film Waterboys. Hirayama's most notable acting role to date is her leading appearance as Yoko in the 2004 South Korean movie Fighter in the Wind. In 2005, Hirayama played the title character Haruka in the Japanese television drama Haruka 17.

== Filmography ==
=== Film ===
- Waterboys (2001)
- Lovers' Kiss (2003)
- Kochira Katsushika-ku Kameari Kōen-mae Hashutsujo The Movie 2 (2003)
- Fighter in the Wind (2004)
- Black Jack (2005) voice
- Atagoal (2006) voice
- Backdancers! (2006)
- Flowers in the Shadows (2008)
- The Incite Mill (2010)

=== Television ===
- Gokusen 3 (Nippon Television, 2008) anime voice
- Hataraki Man (Nippon Television, 2007) anime voice
- Haruka 17 (TV Asahi, 2005)
- Mystery Minzoku Gakusha Yakumo Itsuki (TV Asahi, 2004)
- Gekidan Engimono Unlucky Days - Natsume no Mousou as Miki (Fuji Television, 2004)
- Renai Shousetsu (WOWOW, 2004)
- Dan Doh!! (TV Tokyo, 2004) anime voice
- Kaettekita Locker no Hanako-san (NHK, 2003)
- Boku no Mahou Tsukai (Nippon Television, 2003, ep3)
- Itsumo Futari de (Fuji Television, 2003)
- Locker no Hanako-san (NHK, 2002)
- Ginza no Koi (Nippon Television, 2002)
- Fighting Girl (Fuji Television, 2001)
- Hatachi no Kekkon (Tokyo Broadcasting System, 2000)
- Rinjin wa Hisoka ni warau (Nippon Television, 1999)
- Tengoku no Kiss (Nippon Television, 1999)

=== Computer games ===
- Ø Story (2000, Square Enix) voice
