= Haruka Seventeen =

Japanese manga and TV drama

- Haruka 17
- Logo from TV Asahi's Haruka 17 drama

はるか17 (Haruka Sebuntiin)
- Genre: Drama, comedy
- Manga
- Written by: Sayuka Yamazaki
- Published by: Kodansha
- Magazine: Weekly Morning
- Original run: 2004 – 2006
- Volumes: 13
- Television drama
- Original network: TV Asahi
- Original run: July 1, 2005 – September 16, 2005
- Episodes: 10

Haruka Seventeen (はるか17, Haruka Sebuntiin) is a seinen manga by Sakuya Yamazaki which was serialized by Kodansha in Weekly Morning from 2004 to 2006. It was adapted into a live-action TV drama which aired on TV Asahi in 2005.

== Plot ==
Haruka is about to graduate from a first-rate college and is looking for work, but no one wants to hire her. Faced with the prospect of becoming a "shuushoku rounin" she lowers her expectations and applies at a tiny talent agency for a job as an agent. When she shows up for the interview, it's like no interview she's ever had before. She's asked all sorts of embarrassing questions and asked to say lines in front of a camera.

Later she finds out that they thought she was interviewing to become a talent, and the agent position she wanted has already been given away. However, they think she has that special quality that can make someone a star. She refuses at first but gives in. Thus starts Haruka's career in the entertainment industry.

== TV Drama ==
=== Cast ===
- Aya Hirayama - Haruka Miyamae (宮前遥 Miyamae Haruka)
- Arata Furuta - Takeshi Fukuhara (福原剛史 Fukuhara Takeshi)
- Tetta Sugimoto - Kouhei Sakitani (崎谷浩平 Sakitani Kouhei)
- Saki Seto - Yuri Sakura (佐倉ユリ Sakura Yuri)
- Takatoshi Kaneko - Saruo Momohara (桃原猿男 Momohara Saruo)
- Atsushi Fukazawa - Kanezou Ogura (尾倉兼三 Ogura Kanezou)
- Jiro Sato - Fumi'ichiro Igasaki (伊賀崎文一郎 Igasaki Fumi'ichiro)
- Youko Oshima - Sachiko (幸子 Sachiko)
- Magy - Kengo Kuriyama (栗山賢吾 Kuriyama Kengo)
- Satoshi Hashimoto - Youichi Matsunaga (松永洋一 Matsunaga Youichi)
- Guts Ishimatsu - Iwao Miyamae (宮前岩男 Miyamae Iwao)
- Hitomi Takahashi - Midori Miyamae (宮前ミドリ Miyamae Midori)
- Eri Kurachi - Risa Miyamae (宮前理沙 Miyamae Risa)
- Sawa Suzuki - Eiko Takamura (鷹村英子 Takamura Eiko)
- Sho Tomita - Jin Hashimoto (橋本仁 Hashimoto Jin)
- Sayo Aizawa - Nanako Hasegawa (長谷川奈々子 Hasegawa Nanako)
- Ikeda Tsutomu - Chan (チャン)
- Mioko Oikawa - Chie (チエ)
- Tokuma Nishioka - Ken Kasakura (笠倉健 Kasakura Ken)

=== Staff ===
- Directors - 片山修, 常廣丈太, 木村政和
- Producers - 桑田潔, 平部隆明
- Screenwriter - Youko Nagata (永田優子 Nagata Youko)
- Music - Kei'ichi Miyako (都啓一 Miyako Kei'ichi)
