= Waterboys (film) =

2001 Japanese film

- Theatrical release poster
- Directed by: Shinobu Yaguchi
- Written by: Shinobu Yaguchi
- Produced by: Yoshino Sasaki; Daisuke Sekiguchi; Akifumi Takuma
- Starring: Satoshi Tsumabuki; Hiroshi Tamaki; Akifumi Miura; Koen Kondo; Takatoshi Kaneko; Kei Tani
- Cinematography: Yuichi Nagata
- Edited by: Ryūji Miyajima
- Music by: Hitomi Shimizu; Gakuji Matsuda
- Production company: Altamira Pictures
- Distributed by: Toho
- Release date: September 15, 2001 (Japan)
- Running time: 90 minutes
- Country: Japan
- Language: Japanese

Waterboys (Japanese: ウォーターボーイズ, Hepburn: Wōtā Bōizu) is a 2001 Japanese comedy film written and directed by Shinobu Yaguchi, about five boys who start a synchronized swimming team at their high school. The film stars Satoshi Tsumabuki, Hiroshi Tamaki, Akifumi Miura, Koen Kondo, Takatoshi Kaneko and Naoto Takenaka.

The film was a success in Japan, and was nominated for eight prizes at the Japan Academy Prize, winning awards for 'Best Newcomer' and 'Best Music Score'. A spin-off television series entered its third season in 2005.

== Plot ==
Suzuki is a high-school student who aspires to become a great swimmer. However, he is the only person in the school's abysmal swim team. Soon, a beautiful new swimming teacher named Sakuma starts work at the high school. Dozens of boys decide to join the swimming team, but when they realize that she teaches synchronized swimming (which is generally a women's sport), all but Suzuki and four other boys (self-proclaimed ladies man Sato, scrawny Ohta who wants to improve his fitness, nerdy Kanazawa who can't swim, and effeminate Saotome) drop out. Sakuma unexpectedly takes maternity leave, and for some time the team is on hiatus.

With the swim club sponsorless, the pool gets taken over by the basketball club who use it to hold fish for an upcoming festival. The fish are provided by Isomura, who offers to take all the fish back if the swim club can wrangle them up. Draining the pool at night, the boys try to get all the fish out when they get caught by the night security. The next day, the pool is dried out and all the fish are dead. School principal Sugita puts the club on the hook for paying back for the dead fish and the drained pool. When asked how they'll get the money, Suzuki pulls out a poster Sakuma made for their future synchronized swimming performance. Determined to raise the money back, they try to sell tickets for their performance in the local community, but get mocked by nearly everyone they talk to.

When given a chance to prove to Sugita and Isomura the progress they've made, the boys have a disastrous demonstration, where Sato's prized afro is set on fire and the boys go their separate ways. Suzuki meets Shizuko, a karate club member from the nearby girls school, at a cram school. The two quickly connect with each other and go on a date to the aquarium. When Suzuki watches a dolphin show, he recognizes Isomura as the dolphin trainer and asks him to become their coach, inadvertently abandoning Shizuko in the process.

One by one, Suzuki gets the boys back together and they begin to train under Isomura. Isomura exploits them as free labour at the aquarium and has no intention of training them. In an attempt to ditch them, he leaves the boys at an arcade to practice "rhythm" using Dance Dance Revolution. When he runs out of gas after ditching them, he returns to get some money and discovers that they are totally synchronized (due to the surprisingly coordinated Ohta) and doing well with the game. Motivated to help the boys, Isomura takes them back and continues to train them.

As Suzuki and the boys get ready for another day of work at the aquarium, Shizuko arrives. She wonders if he's been avoiding her since he hasn't been by the cram school. She invites him to her school's festival, where she'll be working at a maid cafe. He promises to go see her, leading to Sato picking on him for finally meeting a girl. At night, Saotome meets with Suzuki privately with the other boys spying on them. Sato thinks Saotome was confessing his love to Suzuki, but Suzuki reveals that he actually confessed his love for Sato, as they've been school mates since elementary school.

While training in the sea, a tourist with a video camera films them, thinking that they are drowning. The boys appear on the news and the story goes viral, leading to the boys who had quit to rejoin. With a buzz around their performance, Sugita calls the boys to his office to give them permission to use the pool again. The five boys work hard to teach synchronized swimming to the full club in time for their performance.

The night before the festival, Suzuki meets with Shizuko and the tells her he won't be able to visit her maid cafe. Before he can invite her to his synchronized swimming performance, there are sirens in the distance. A fire near the school broke out, and the pool is drained when the water is used to fight the fire. The next morning, the pool is too low for their performance. Gathered at the drained pool, the club prepares to cancel their performance, but members of the festival committee for their neighboring girls' school proposes that they use their pool. The club is excited, except for Suzuki who is suddenly petrified.

At the new pool, the full club gets ready for their show. A raucous crowd claps and chants for the synchro club, including Shizuko. Sato recognizes her and points her out to Suzuki, who refuses to get ready. As the music starts and the club runs out, Isomura goes to talk to Suzuki, joking that if Suzuki doesn't go out there he'll take his place. Isomura tells Suzuki he never intended to train the boys for anything, but that they got this far together and Suzuki owes it to himself to go out and join the performance. Suzuki leaps through the audience and joins the club, to Shizuko's joy. After a brief snafu where Suzuki loses his swim trunks, Shizuko throws a pair she made just for him. The crowd gives the synchro club a standing ovation.

== Cast ==
- Satoshi Tsumabuki as Suzuki
- Hiroshi Tamaki as Sato
- Akifumi Miura as Ohta
- Koen Kondo as Kanazawa
- Takatoshi Kaneko as Saotome
- Aya Hirayama as Shizuko
- Kaori Manabe as Mrs. Sakuma
- Naoto Takenaka as Isomura
- Tetta Sugimoto as Sugita
- Takashi Kawamura as Ikeuchi
- Hiroshi Matsunaga as Mochizuki
- Yuya Nishikawa as Sakamoto
- Katsuyuki Yamazaki as Yama-chan
- Taiyo Sugiura as Taiyo
- Koutaro Tanaka as Koutarou
- Makoto Ishihara as Makoto

== Spin-offs ==
=== TV series ===
- Water Boys
- Water Boys 2
- Water Boys 2005 Natsu
