= Kōen Kondō =

Japanese actor

Kōen Kondō (近藤公園; born 11 October 1978) is a Japanese actor. He made his debut in the popular 2001 film Waterboys.

== Selected filmography ==
=== Films ===
- Waterboys (2001)
- Parco Fiction (2002)
- Ping Pong (2002)
- Showa kayo daizenshu (2003)
- Sayonara, Kuro (2003)
- Zebraman (2004)
- Love and Honor (2006)
- Thirteen Assassins (2010)
- About Her Brother (2010)
- Samurai Hustle (2014)
- Cape Nostalgia (2014)
- Recall (2018)
- Punk Samurai Slash Down (2018)
- It's a Flickering Life (2021)

=== Television ===
- Midnight Diner: Tokyo Stories (2016)
- Idaten (2019), Rinsen Nakazawa
- Roppongi Class (2022), Yukio Sakuragi
