= Aera (magazine) =

Japanese weekly magazine

- Cover of August 14•21, 2006 issue.
- Categories: News, Photography (gravure)
- Frequency: Weekly
- First issue: May 1988
- Company: Asahi Shimbun
- Country: Japan
- Based in: Osaka
- Language: Japanese
- ISSN: 0991-8833
- OCLC: 1052629196

Aera, formerly known as Asahi Journal, is a Japanese weekly magazine printed in gravure, published by Asahi Shimbun. The magazine combines photographs and news stories. In May 1988, Aera replaced Asahi Journal with more weekly substance.

The cover story is called Person in Focus. Eiichirō Sakata takes cover photos for Aera, and since the person on the cover is the photographer, it is a self-portrait.

The title Aera is derived from the Latin word that means "era" in English, and a backronym said to mean "Asahi Shimbun Extra Research and Analysis."

Aera's advertisement in the Asahi features topical dajare (word play).

== People who have appeared in Aera's cover story Person in Focus ==
Issue number and names in Japanese and roman script.

=== Issues of 1998 ===
- May 11 issue - Meja
- June 8 issue - Jean Reno
- June 28 issue - Ricky Martin
- August 3 issue - Joaquín Cortés
- September 21 issue - James Turrell
- November 2 issue - Yoshio Taniguchi
- November 9 issue - Alek Wek
- November 16 issue - Richard Branson
- December 21 issue - Faye Wong

=== Issues of 1999 ===
- January 18 issue - Philippe Starck
- January 25 issue - LeAnn Rimes
- May 31 issue - Jewel
- June 28 issue - Yayoi Kusama
- November 15 issue - Haley Joel Osment
- November 29 issue - Jane Birkin
- December 13 issue - Alina Kabayeva
- December 20 issue - Milla Jovovich

=== Issues of 2000 ===
- January 10 issue - Carly Fiorina
- January 17 issue - Tatsuya Fujiwara
- February 7 issue - Andrew Weil
- February 14 issue - Carlos Ghosn
- February 21 issue - Sergio García
- February 28 issue - Daniel Keyes
- March 13 issue - Gerhard Schröder
- March 20 issue - Charlotte Church
- March 27 issue - Yasser Arafat
- April 17 issue - Yoshirō Mori
- April 24 issue - Émilie Dequenne
- May 8 issue - Ringo Shiina
- May 29 issue - Rickson Gracie
- June 12 issue - Robin Williams
- July 31 issue - Enrique Iglesias
- September 11 issue - Valery Gergiev
- September 18 issue - Vladimir Putin
- October 2 issue - Koji Murofushi
- October 9 issue - Desmond Morris
- October 23 issue - Nikita Mikhalkov
- November 6 issue - Hideki Shirakawa
- November 13 issue - Zhang Ziyi
- December 4 issue - Jeff Bezos

=== Issues of 2001 ===
- January 8 issue - Tiger Woods
- February 5 issue - Ibrahim Ferrer
- March 5 issue - Hiroyasu Shimizu
- March 19 issue - Koichi Wakata
- March 26 issue - Vladimir Ashkenazy
- April 16 issue - Ichiro Suzuki, Tsuyoshi Shinjo
- April 23 issue - Kitarō
- May 7 issue - Ian Thorpe
- May 14 issue - Junichiro Koizumi
- May 28 issue - Karrie Webb
- June 11 issue - Christian Bale
- June 18 issue - Naomi Kawase
- June 25 issue - Yoshida Brothers
- August 27 issue - Linus Torvalds
- September 17 issue - Hironobu Sakaguchi
- November 5 issue - Plácido Domingo
- December 10 issue - Nina Ananiashvili

=== Issues of 2002 ===
- February 4 issue - Hamid Karzai
- February 18 issue - Donald Keene
- February 25 issue - John Cameron Mitchell
- March 4 issue - José Carreras
- March 11 issue - Sammi Cheng
- March 25 issue - Muhammad Yunus
- April 8 issue - Hideki Matsui
- April 15 issue - Sepp Blatter
- May 13 issue - Junichi Inamoto
- May 20 issue - Morgan Freeman
- June 3 issue - Alicia Keys
- July 1 issue - Kelly Chen
- July 8 issue - Tommy Lee Jones
- July 22 issue - Romano Prodi
- August 19 issue - Nicolas Cage
- September 9 issue - Cai Guo-Qiang
- September 23 issue - Mariko Mori
- September 30 issue - Megumi Yokota
- October 7 issue - John Woo
- October 21 issue - Zico
- October 28 issue - Koichi Tanaka
- December 9 issue - Annika Sörenstam
- December 22 issue - Leonardo DiCaprio

=== Issues of 2003 ===
- January 6 issue - Ayumi Hamasaki
- February 17 issue - Jon Bon Jovi
- April 14 issue - Astro Boy
- June 2 issue - Yuta Tabuse
- June 16 issue - Keanu Reeves
- July 14 issue - t.A.T.u.
- August 11 issue - Lisa Marie Presley
- September 8 issue - Miuccia Prada
- October 6 issue - Alice Walker
- November 24 issue - Quentin Tarantino
- December 22 issue - Riccardo Muti

=== Issues of 2004 ===
- January 5 issue - Hillary Clinton
- January 19 issue - Paula Radcliffe
- January 26 issue - Nigel Kennedy
- February 9 issue - Shigetoshi Hasegawa
- February 16 issue - Norah Jones
- March 1 issue - Matthew Bourne
- March 8 issue - Daniela Hantuchová
- April 26 issue - Sofia Coppola
- May 17 issue - Hiromi Uehara
- July 5 issue - Won Bin
- July 12 issue - Yūya Yagira
- August 2 issue - Tobey Maguire
- September 20 issue - Bill Clinton
- October 4 issue - Lester R. Brown
- October 18 issue - Jonny Wilkinson
- October 30 issue - Kosuke Kitajima
- November 8 issue - Ken Watanabe
- November 29 issue - Lee Byung-hun
- December 13 issue - Takuma Sato
- December 20 issue - Simon Rattle
- December 27 issue - Emmanuelle Béart

=== Issues of 2005 ===
- January 24 issue - Gwyneth Paltrow
- January 31 issue - Andrew Lloyd Webber
- February 21 issue - Colin Farrell
- March 7 issue - Alain Ducasse
- March 14 issue - Peter Schreier
- May 23 issue - Hayley Westenra
- July 11 issue - Jack Johnson
- July 18 issue - Bruno Ganz
- November 7 issue - Rei Asami
- November 14 issue - Dan Gillmor
- November 21 extra issue - Soichi Noguchi
- November 28 issue - Natsuhiko Kyogoku
- December 5 issue - Eric Schmidt
- December 12 issue - Dardenne brothers
- December 19 issue - Kaiji Moriyama
- December 26 issue - Li Yundi

=== Issues of 2006 ===
- January 2–9 issue - Kotooshu Katsunori
- January 16 issue - Nikolaus Harnoncourt
- January 23 issue - Asashoryu Akinori
- January 30 issue - Takafumi Horie
- February 6 issue - Aoi Miyazaki
- February 27 issue - Shizuka Arakawa
- March 6 issue - Noel Gallagher
- March 13 issue - Toots Thielemans
- March 27 issue - Wangari Maathai
- April 10 issue - Kotaro Oshio
- April 24 issue - Masahiko Fujiwara
- May 29 issue - James Blunt
- July 3 issue - Juanes
- October 23 issue - Paula Creamer
- November 13 issue - Dominique Perrault
- December 4 issue - Bill Viola
- December 11 issue - Roger Federer
- December 25 issue - Beyoncé Knowles

=== Issues of 2007 ===
- January 22 issue - Desmond Tutu
- January 29 issue - Michelle Wie
- February 19 issue - Al Gore
- March 12 issue - George Soros
- March 19 issue - Steve Chen, Chad Hurley
- April 23 issue - Rinko Kikuchi
- June 4 issue - Kirsten Dunst
- August 6 issue - M.I.A.
- November 19 issue - Takashi Murakami
- December 3 issue - Raul Midón

=== Issues of 2008 ===
- March 17 issue - Jude Law
- May 12 issue - Namie Amuro
- June 23 issue - B'z
- July 14 issue - Diablo Cody
- November 10 issue - Masumi Kuwata

=== Issues of 2009 ===
- January 16 issue - Daisuke Matsuzaka
- March 19 issue - Hidetoshi Nakata
- April 27 issue - Liam Gallagher
- August 3 issue - Lady Gaga
- August 17 issue - Richard Gere
