= Moyoco Anno =

Japanese manga artist (born 1971)

Moyoco Anno 安野 モヨコ
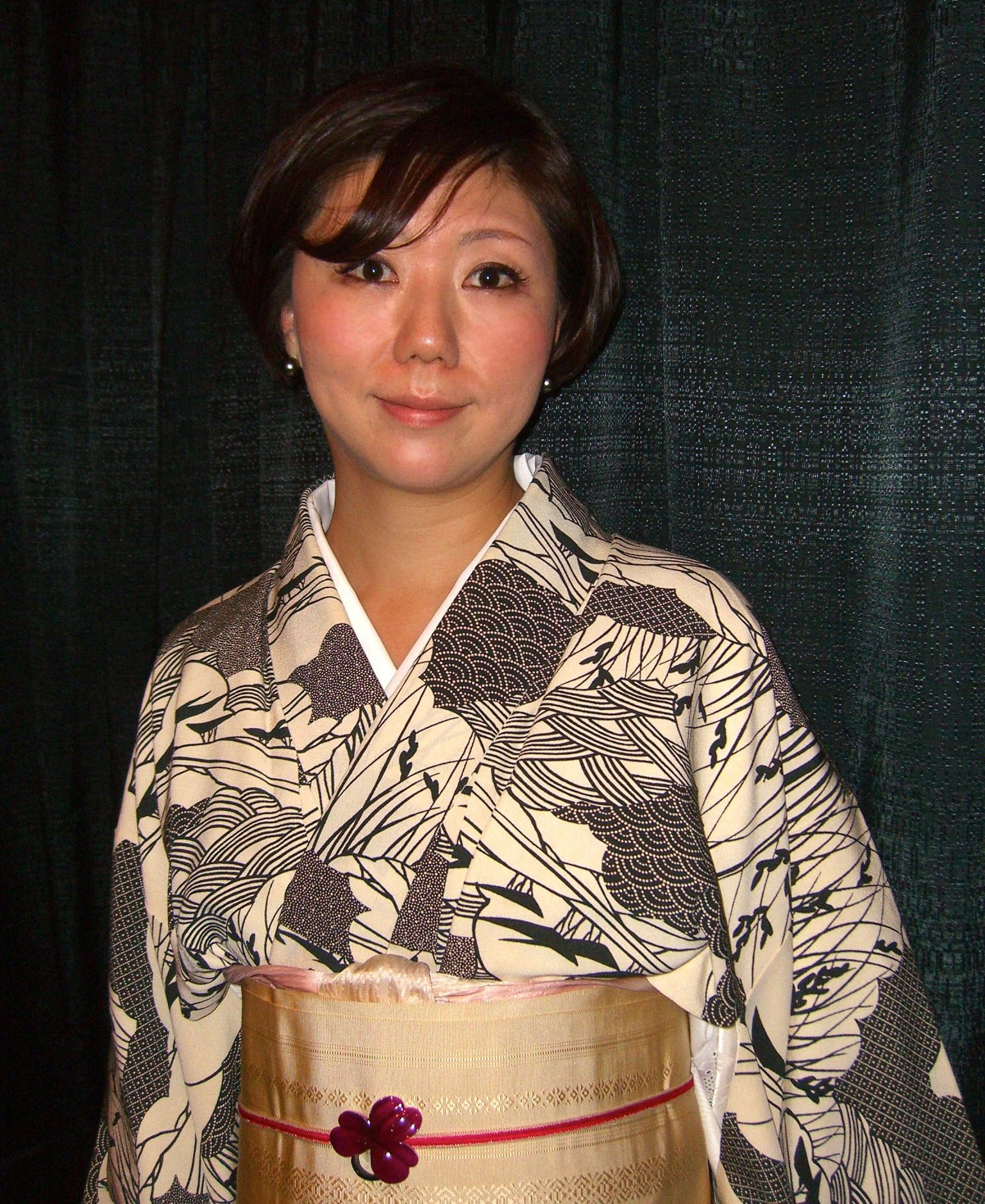
- Moyoco Anno at 2012 New York Comic Con
- Born: March 26, 1971 (age 55) Suginami, Tokyo, Japan
- Area: Manga artist
- Awards: Kodansha Manga Award for shōjo in 1998
- Spouse: Hideaki Anno (m. 2002)

Moyoco Anno (安野 モヨコ, Anno Moyoko; born March 26, 1971), formerly known simply by the mononym Moyoco (モヨコ, Moyoko), is a Japanese manga artist and fashion writer, with numerous books published in both categories. Her work Sugar Sugar Rune won the Kodansha manga award for children in 2005. Anno is married to director Hideaki Anno of Neon Genesis Evangelion fame. Anno had aspired to be a manga artist since her third year at elementary school.

== Works ==
Anno draws inspiration from the fashion world, and her work is noted for its detail which gives it a broader appeal than just the demographic it is aimed for. She delves into the psychology of her characters. Her manga and books have attained considerable popularity among young women in Japan. Though she primarily writes manga of the josei demographic, her most popular series, Sugar Sugar Rune, (serialized in Nakayoshi) is targeted at primary school-aged girls. In a recent Oricon poll, she was voted the number eight most popular manga artist among females and thirteen in the general category. Her manga Happy Mania was made into a television series in 1998, followed by Hataraki Man in October 2007. Sakuran was made into a movie in 2006. More than 3 million copies were sold of Happy Mania.

In the movie Japan Sinks, she has a cameo role alongside her husband; their characters were also married. The movie was directed by Shinji Higuchi, who, like her husband Hideaki Anno, is a co-founder of Gainax.

Anno took a career hiatus in 2008, citing health reasons. During this hiatus, she published essays in manga form about her life with her husband.

In October 2020, it was announced Anno's manga Memoirs of Amorous Gentlemen will be adapted into a Broadway musical. It will be the first Japanese manga to be adapted into an American musical.

== Awards and honors ==
- Anno won the 29th Kodansha Manga Award for children's manga in 2005 for Sugar Sugar Rune.
- Asteroid 300082 Moyocoanno, discovered by Japanese amateur astronomer Yasuhide Fujita in 2006, was named in her honor. The official naming citation was published by the Minor Planet Center on 6 April 2012 (M.P.C. 79108).

== List of works ==
Title	Year	Notes	Refs
Chō Kanden Shōjo Mona (超感電少女モナ, Super Electric Shock Girl Mona)	1994	Published in 1 volume	
Trumps!	1994	Published in 2 volumes	
Peek a Boo	1994	Published in 1 volume	
Happy Mania	1996–2000 (vol.)	Serialized in Feel Young magazine. Published by Shodensha in 10 volumes	
In Clothes Called Fat	1997	Published in 1 volume	
Jelly in the Merry-go-round (ジェリー イン ザ メリィゴーラウンド)	1997–98 (vol.)	Published in 3 volumes	
Patrol QT (パトロール・QT)	1997	Published in 1 volume	
Love Master X (ラブマスターX)	1998–99 (vol.)	Published Wonderland in 3 volumes	
Angelic House (エンジェリック・ハウス)	1999	Published in 1 volume	
Chameleon Army (カメレオン・アーミー)	1999	Published in 1 volume	
Jelly Beans (ジェリービーンズ)	1999–2002 (vol.)	Wonderland comics, 5 volumes	
Flowers & Bees (花とみつばち, Hana to Mitsubachi)	2000–2003 (vol.)	Published by Yan maga KC, 7 volumes	
Tundra Blue Ice (ツンドラ ブルーアイス)	2000	Published in 1 volume	
Baby G (ベイビーG)	2001	Published in 1 volume	
Sakuran	2001 (2003 vol.)	Published in 1 volume	
Sugar Sugar Rune	2003–07	Serialized in Nakayoshi magazine Published by Kodansha in 8 volumes	
Hataraki Man	2004–07 (vol.)	Published in 4 volumes	
Insufficient Direction (監督不行届, Kantoku Fuyuki Todoki)	2005	Published in 1 volume	
The Diary of Ochibi-san (オチビサン)	2008–21 (vol.)	Published in 10 volumes	
Buffalo 5 Girls (バッファロー5人娘, Baffarō Gonin Musume)	2013	Published in 1 volume	
Memoirs of Amorous Gentlemen (鼻下長紳士回顧録, Bikachō Shinshi Kaikoroku)	2013	Published in 2 volumes	
