= Sugar Sugar Rune =

Japanese manga series

- Cover of the first manga volume

シュガシュガルーン (Shuga Shuga Rūn)
- Genre: Magical girl
- Manga
- Written by: Moyoco Anno
- Published by: Kodansha
- English publisher: NA: Udon Entertainment
- Magazine: Nakayoshi
- Original run: September 2003 – May 2007
- Volumes: 8
- Anime television series
- Directed by: Yukihiro Matsushita
- Produced by: Noriko Kobayashi; Yoshirō Kataoka; Ken Hagino
- Written by: Reiko Yoshida
- Music by: Yasufumi Fukuda; Yasuharu Konishi; Yutaka Minobe; Tomoko Sasaki
- Studio: Studio Pierrot
- Original network: TXN (TV Tokyo)
- English network: PH: Cartoon Network
- Original run: July 2, 2005 – June 24, 2006
- Episodes: 51
- Original net animation

Sugar Sugar Rune Les deux sorcières
- Directed by: Yusuke Matsui
- Written by: Yusuke Matsui
- Music by: Takeshi Nakatsuka
- Studio: Studio Khara
- Released: July 4, 2025
- Runtime: 6 minutes
- Anime
- Directed by: Yusuke Matsui
- Studio: Studio Khara

Sugar Sugar Rune (Japanese: シュガシュガルーン, Hepburn: Shuga Shuga Rūn) or Sugar² Rune is a Japanese magical girl manga series written and illustrated by Moyoco Anno and serialized in the shōjo manga magazine Nakayoshi from September 2003 to May 2007. The series was collected into eight volumes published by Kodansha from September 2003 to May 2007. Sugar Sugar Rune was adapted into an anime television series produced by Studio Pierrot, which aired on TV Tokyo from July 2, 2005, to June 24, 2006. A new anime of the reboot/remake adaptation produced by Studio Khara has been announced.

Sugar Sugar Rune won the 29th Kodansha Manga Awards in the children's manga category.

== Plot ==
In the Magical World, the future queen is chosen by selecting two young witches and sending them to the Human World, where they'll compete to capture the hearts of boys. Whoever has collected the most by the end of the competition is crowned queen.

This generation's Queen Candidates are best friends and opposites, Vanilla Mieux and Chocolat Meilleure, the daughters of the current queen and her former competitor. They're aided by their assigned mentor and guardian, pop idol witch Rockin' Robin, and their two animal familiars, Blanca the mouse and Duke the frog.

In addition to competing for hearst at their new school, the girls become involved in a conflict surrounding Pierre, who is a middle school student who bears a resemblance to Glace, the former evil king. Pierre is interested in Chocolat, and, as a result the relationship and the competition with Vanilla threaten to complicate. As their experiences in the Human World begin to challenge their friendship and their individual goals, the two witches mus navigate the competition while confronting the forces that threaten Magical World.

== Characters ==
Chocolat Meilleure/Chocolat Kato (ショコラ・メイユール/加藤 ショコラ, Shokora Meiyuuru/Kato Shokora)
Voiced by: Marika Matsumoto (2005 anime), Miyu Kobashi (upcoming anime)
Chocolat is a very energetic girl with a forceful personality. She is best friends with Vanilla and is the daughter of the so called, late witch Cinnamon. She has long orange hair, large emerald green eyes, and pointy ears. In the human world, she is not as popular as Vanilla since her temper makes most boys wary, but she is able to make friends with them instead. Her energetic and cheerful personality makes her very popular in the Magical World, and at the beginning of the series she finds the switch between her and Vanilla's popularity in the human world harrowing. She is very caring and a loyal friend, but she can be very aggressive and prideful. She is secretly in love with Pierre. Her familiar is a lazy but powerful frog named Duke. In her world, she lives with her grandfather, Corne, a powerful wizard who, like Chocolat, has a certain dislike for Blanca. As the series progresses, Chocolat and Pierre develop feelings for each other and (in the anime) end up exchanging hearts and sharing their first kisses. In the anime, she loses the queen contest but Vanilla gives up the throne (making Chocolat Queen). In the manga, Chocolat and Pierre went missing and lost their memories which made them return a few years later, for Vanilla's coronation. Her Theme Color is pink.
Vanilla Mieux/Vanilla Aisu (バニラ・ミュー/愛須 バニラ, Banira Myuu/Aisu Banira)
Voiced by: Juri Ibata (2005 anime), Tsukino Chikasada (upcoming anime)
Vanilla is a shy and gentle girl. Best friends with Chocolat, she is the daughter of Queen Candy. Blanca is her familiar. She has short blond curly hair, purple eyes, and pointy ears. Because of her compassion, empathy, and cuteness, she is more popular than Chocolat with human boys, which leads Chocolat to believe that the Human World and the Magic World are opposites. Vanilla was less popular in the Magical World than Chocolat, due to her shy personality. Vanilla is also more conscientious, and more dutiful than Chocolat. However, in the third volume Chocolat is able to beat her in getting hearts sometimes. About midway through the series, Vanilla feels insecure and inferior to Chocolat and becomes Ogre Princess due to Pierre's trickery. Chocolat is able to save her. In the anime, Vanilla wins the crown but gives it to Chocolat. In the last volume of the manga, Vanilla wins the right to be Queen, but refuses to take the crown. She finally accepts the crown because Chocolat is missing. After Chocolat is found, she still retains her position as Queen upon Chocolat's wish. She ends up with Houx. Her Theme Color is purple.
Rockin' Robin (ロッキン・ロビン, Rokkin Robin)
Voiced by: Kenjiro Tsuda
Rockin' Robin is the mentor of Vanilla and Chocolat. He also records their progress in stealing hearts. He is a popular rock star in the Human World ("Rockin' Robin" and "Rock'n Lovin'" have the same spelling in katakana). Although he may seem a bit rude, he has a caring heart, although he rarely displays it. According to Blanca, Robin is actually 6800 years old and uses facial masks to retain a youthful appearance. He seems to be particularly afraid of sharp objects. In the manga, he sacrifices himself for Chocola in the final battle.
Duke (デューク, Dyūku)
Voiced by: Yūichi Yasoda
Duke is a red and black striped frog who is the Chocolat's familiar. He helps her steal hearts, but isn't much help at the beginning. He has a rivalry with Blanca. Mostly, he is quite lazy and rude, and has an extensive knowledge about hearts, which proves useful later. Duke is actually Chocolat's uncle, the little brother of Cinnamon, who was transformed into a frog. He tells Queen Candy that he turned himself into a frog to pose as a familiar, as he was wanted by the authorities after he concealed Cinnamon when she was on the run. However, his transformation worked too well, and his magical power as a familiar became too weak to allow him to transform back. At the end of Volume 6 he is returned to his human form via a white heart.
Blanca (ブランカ, Buranka)
Voiced by: Chisa Yokoyama
Blanca is a magical mouse and the familiar of Vanilla. In the story, she helps Vanilla win at first. She enjoys teasing Chocolat, Duke, and almost anyone who annoys her. She also likes tea parties with her mice friends. Chocolat calls her "Rat". Even though she has a very bitter relationship with Chocolat, there are times when she can show her soft side towards her. In the manga, she was originally a witch named Libbie who ran a salon in the Magical World, but was turned into a familiar when she fell in love with a human and lost her heart. She is turned back into her original form with the power of Pierre's (now white) heart.
Pierre Tempête de Neige (ピエール・タンペート・ド・ネージュ, Piēru Tanpēto do Nēju)
Voiced by: Daiki Konishi
Pierre is a popular and handsome boy at Chocolat's school, but he has a cold heart, and is not as innocent as he looks. He's the captain of the fencing and tennis teams of the school and has a fan club of beautiful but cruel and cold junior-high student girls known as 'The Members', who dislike Chocolat being near their Prince. His magical ability is high, as well as his physical strength and capability. Almost nobody can resist his charisma and charm, and many human girls in Chocolat's school are in love with him. He has white blonde hair and ice blue eyes, and is taller than most people in his class.
It is discovered in Volume 2, that Pierre is also from the magical world when he almost takes Chocolat's heart. When he was a little boy the ogres kidnapped him and made him the Ogre Prince, so he didn't choose becoming that and wasn't born as an Ogre. As the story goes on, Pierre begins to fall in love with Chocolat, as does she. He has huge feelings for her and claims that he doesn't know why he can not leave her alone and "involuntarily" risks his life to save her many times. Pierre's noir heart conflicts with a pink heart. In the anime, they exchange hearts. In the manga, Pierre and Chocolat go missing for years after the last battle, with severe amnesia. Once they regain their memories, they manage to be in time for Vanilla's coronation and reunite with her, as well as their other friends. They depart to the humans' world to start a new life, and Pierre's heart is shown to be red for Chocolat.
Houx (ウー, Ū) and Saule (ソウル, Souru)
Voiced by: Ryōhei Kimura (Houx), Naoya Iwahashi (Saule)
Twin brothers who are close childhood friends with Chocolat and Vanilla from the Magical World. They both have quite brash personalities that can sometimes land them into trouble. They both come to the Human World as new students in Chocolat and Vanilla's school to protect them. Both of them have a strong liking towards Chocolat, arguing about who will be Chocolat's King when she gets the crown. Turns out that Houx fell in love with Vanilla.
Queen Candy (クイーンキャンディ, Kuīn Kyandi)
Voiced by: Sumi Shimamoto
The Queen of the Magical World and Vanilla's mother. Even though Vanilla's mother is a queen, she kept a careful eye on the Queen Candidate and the Queen Candidacy so that the ogres could not interfere again. In the anime, she loses the Queen Candidacy, but after the sacrifice made by Cinnamon for the Magical World, the throne was given to her after replacing Cinnamon's place. In the manga, she sacrifices herself at the end to help Chocola defeat Glacé, acknowledging Chocolat as the Magical World's Queen.
Cinnamon Meilleure (シナモン・メイユール, Shinamon Meiyūru)
Voiced by: Uran Sakiko
Chocolat's mother and a famous witch. She was a previous Queen Candidate along with Candy Mieux, she won the candidacy, however she sacrificed the throne for the freedom to save the Magic World. Under circumstances not clearly explained in the manga, Cinnamon went to visit Glacé, the grand duke of darkness, while Candy took over as queen. In Volume 7, it is revealed that Cinnamon had Chocolat around this time, and that Chocolat's father is the King of the Ogres himself. Cinnamon was actually Pierre's familiar who had her voice taken away. Cinnamon fights against Glacé at the end of Volume 8, but stays behind with him as he fades away. She is disguised as a black cat that Pierre is sometimes seen with. In the last episode, when the queen is decided, she asks Robin and Glacier to help her take care of Chocolat. It is said that Cinnamon and Candy were friends during the Queen candidacy. Candy never collected hearts no matter how popular she was. Some say she intentionally did that, feeling that Cinnamon would make the better Queen.
Waffle (ワッフル, Waffuru)
Voiced by: Ayaka Saitō
Waffle's an anime only character, an immature but kind young witch girl that's always trying to get Houx's affection. In the series, she always caused trouble during the adventures of Chocolat and others. At the start, she has a certain dislike for Chocolat, for that reason she'll steal Houx from her. She's always accompanied by her devoted nanny and travels around in a huge squirrel-looking flying animal.

== Media ==
=== Manga ===
The eight-volume manga was written and illustrated by Moyoco Anno. In comparison to the anime, which ended before its serialization in Nakayoshi, the manga more strongly emphasizes the struggle between the witches and the ogres. It was initially published in English by Del Rey Manga, but Udon Entertainment currently has the rights.

No.	Release date	ISBN
1	March 25, 2004	978-4-06-334859-0
2	October 21, 2004	978-4-06-334930-6
3	May 19, 2005	978-4-06-372014-3
4	October 12, 2005	978-4-06-372077-8
5	February 10, 2006	978-4-06-372129-4
6	July 13, 2006	978-4-06-372166-9
7	December 28, 2006	978-4-06-372246-8
8	September 13, 2007	978-4-06-372316-8

=== Anime ===
In 2005, Sugar Sugar Rune was adapted into an anime television series produced by Studio Pierrot under the direction of Matsushita Yukihiro. Consisting of fifty-one episodes with scripts composed by Reiko Yoshida and music by Yasufumi Fukuda, Yutaka Minobe, Tomoko Sasaki and Yasuharu Konishi (only the latter is credited in the opening and staff list of the anime, however), the series was broadcast on TV Tokyo in Japan between July 2, 2005, and June 24, 2006.

Three pieces of theme music are used—one opening theme and two closing themes. The opening theme is "Crazy for Chocolat" (ショコラに夢中, Shokora ni Muchū) by Karia Nomoto. The closing theme for the first twenty-nine episodes is "The World Beyond the Moon" (月の向こうの世界, Tsuki no Mukō no Sekai) by Karia Nomoto and the last twenty episodes is "Date Date" (デート☆デート, Dēto Dēto) by the series starring voice actresses Marika Matsumoto and Juri Ibata.

A CG short anime ONA titled Sugar Sugar Rune Les deux sorcières, produced by Studio Khara and directed and written by Yusuke Matsui for the anime's 20th anniversary and serving as a prologue to the original manga, was initially released at Japan Expo 2025 and later released on YouTube. At the same time and event, it was announced that a separate new anime adaptation by the same studio and director is also in production.

== Reception ==
Sugar Sugar Rune won the 29th Kodansha Manga Awards in the children's manga category. It was called "the greatest fantasy comic of the last five years" by an Anime News Network reviewer, who praised its stylish art and epic conclusion.
