= Hana Monogatari =

Short story collection by Nobuko Yoshiya

- Volume 1 cover (1939 edition), with artwork by Jun'ichi Nakahara
- Author: Nobuko Yoshiya
- Illustrator: Koji Fukiya; Fumiko Kametaka; Jun'ichi Nakahara; Yoshio Shimizu
- Language: Japanese
- Genre: Shōjo shōsetsu; Class S
- Published: 1916–1926 (Note: Serialized in Shōjo Gahō from 1916 to 1924, and in Shōjo Club from 1925 to 1926)
- Publisher: various (Note: Initial serialization published by Tōkyōsha; first book edition published by Rakuyōdō)
- Publication place: Japan
- Media type: Short-story collection

Hana Monogatari (花物語; lit. 'Flower Stories' or 'Flower Tales', also romanized as Hanamonogatari) is a series of fifty-two short stories written by Japanese author Nobuko Yoshiya. They were first published as a serial in the magazine Shōjo Gahō ('Girls' Pictorial') from 1916 to 1924, and in Shōjo Club ('Girls' Club') from 1925 to 1926. The stories of Hana Monogatari are each named after a flower, and typically focus on a sentimental and tragic romantic friendship between two female characters. The series was first published as a book in 1920, and has been regularly reprinted in both the pre- and post-war eras.

Hana Monogatari reflects Yoshiya's distinctive and influential writing style known as bibun (lit. 'beautiful writing'), an aestheticized style of writing defined by its fluid prose and frequent use of modern text symbols. Scholarly analysis of Hana Monogatari has considered the series in relation to the then-dominant "good wife, wise mother" social expectations placed upon girls; these depictions of gender and sexuality have been alternately considered in the context of Yoshiya's own sexual orientation and of sexuality in Japanese shōjo (girls') culture broadly, particularly the social practice of romantic friendships between Japanese schoolgirls referred to as Class S.

Yoshiya is among the most prolific and commercially successful Japanese writers of the twentieth century, and Hana Monogatari is her most famous work. It is regarded as among the best known and most representative works of early shōjo culture, and was significantly influential on the literature and aesthetics of that culture. Contemporaneous Japanese literary critics often took a low view of popular fiction generally and Hana Monogatari specifically; the series was largely excluded from consideration within the Japanese literary canon until a period of renewed scholarly interest in Yoshiya in the 1990s prompted its reassessment.

== Background ==
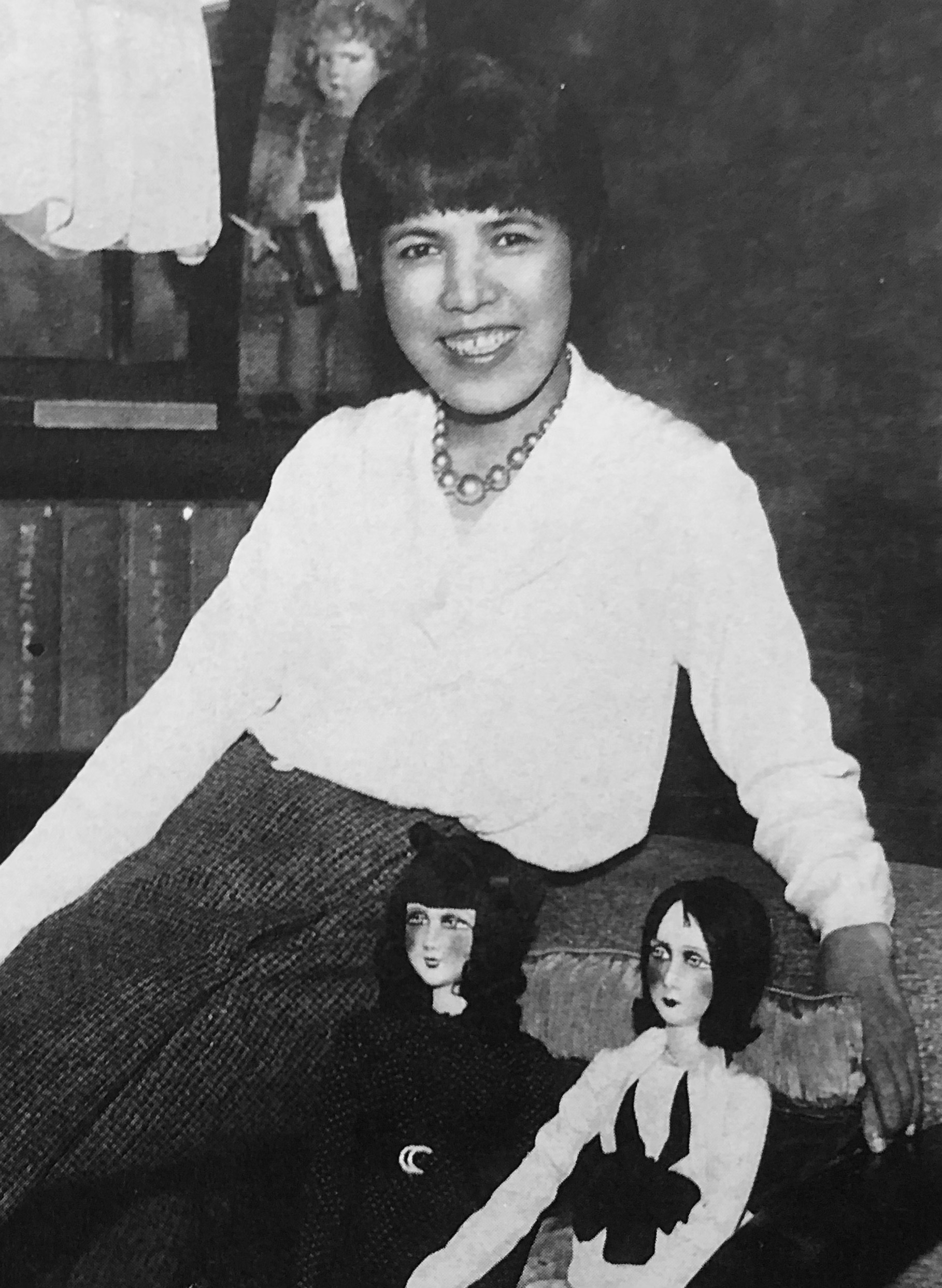
Nobuko Yoshiya (pictured 1928)

=== Context ===
Nobuko Yoshiya (January 12, 1896 – July 11, 1973) was among the most prolific and commercially successful (Note: By 1935 Yoshiya was the highest-paid writer in the country, earning an income three times that of the prime minister.) Japanese writers of the twentieth century, credited with significantly developing the genres of shōjo shōsetsu ("girls' fiction") and tsuzoku shōsetsu ("popular fiction"). Yoshiya's works were popular among shōjo (lit. 'girl'), a term that came into common usage at the turn of the century to denote adolescent females at the age between childhood and marriage, and which emerged as a social category as increasing numbers of Japanese girls began to attend secondary school.

A social practice of romantic friendships between girls known as Class S was a ubiquitous element of Japan's early all-girls schools from their establishment at the turn of the century until the broader decline of shōjo culture in the late 1930s. This practice was often depicted in the fiction and non-fiction stories published in magazines aimed at shōjo readers; many of Yoshiya's stories examine themes of dōseiai (lit. 'same-sex love'), with passionate friendships between female characters recurring as a frequent theme in her writing.

=== Publication history ===
Following the cessation of the feminist literary journal Bluestocking in 1916, to which Yoshiya regularly contributed, she submitted a short story titled Suzuran (lit. 'Lily of the Valley') to the shōjo magazine Shōjo Gahō. Shōjo Gahō editor Wada Kokō agreed to publish the story on the condition that Yoshiya write several additional similarly-themed short stories for the magazine, which she obliged. Suzuran was published in the July 1916 issue of the magazine, and additional short stories by Yoshiya were subsequently serialized in the magazine under the title Hana Monogatari.

Cover of the July 1916 issue of Shōjo Gahō

The series was an immediate success, and though Hana Monogatari was originally planned to end after seven entries, overwhelmingly positive reader response led to its continued serialization until 1924. When publisher Kōran Shuppan asked for additional material to fill the pages of a planned book edition of Hana Monogatari, serialization resumed in the magazine Shōjo Club in 1925, and concluded in 1926. A total of fifty-two short stories form the corpus of Hana Monogatari.

The first paperback edition of Hana Monogatari was published in 1920 by the publishing company Rakuyōdō, while serialization in Shōjo Gahō was still ongoing. It has been regularly reprinted, most popularly in 1939 as a three-volume set with cover illustrations by Jun'ichi Nakahara. Selected entries of Hana Monogatari were also re-printed in the magazine Shōjo no tomo ("Girls' Friend") from 1937 to 1938.

== Content ==
=== Plot ===
The fifty-two stories of Hana Monogatari are each named after a flower, which appears within the story as a plot device and as its main imagery. Though shōjo magazines typically used a wide variety of genres to categorize their narrative prose stories, (Note: E.g. "long shōjo shōsetsu", "children's stories", "girl detective stories", etc.) Hana Monogatari was not designated with a specific genre when it was serialized in Shōjo Gahō. There is wide variation across stories in Hana Monogatari, but pedagogist Masuko Honda identifies the following five attributes as core recurring elements:

- Thematic focus on "non-heterosexual 'pure love'", to the exclusion of the then-dominant "good wife, wise mother" doctrine
- A female same-sex pairing as the central characters, usually a senior and junior student or a teacher and pupil (Note: Male characters appear seldomly in Hana Monogatari; when they do, they are typically relegated to minor roles where they are sympathetic or neutral towards the main female characters.)
- A "closed world" setting, such as a girls' school or boarding house
- Fine, lofty prose that blends classical Western and Japanese writing styles
- Plots aimed at appealing to the reader's emotions, rather than conveying a specific message or moral

Stories in Hana Monogatari are broadly sentimental in tone, with a student's crush on another student or teacher recurring as a common plotline. Though only a minority of stories in Hana Monogatari specifically depict a Class S relationship, its relationships are frequently constructed in a manner typical of these relationships, i.e. with a focus on "distance rather than intimacy", and on the innocent or spiritual connection between the characters rather than physical affection.

While the positive and normative nature of these feelings is invariably emphasized, sad endings are frequent: love is unrequited, or the couple is separated by circumstances such as a change of feelings, financial problems, illness, graduation, marriage, or death. Thematic emphasis is placed on the fleeting and transitory nature of these relationships, and by direct or indirect implication, the fleeting and transitory nature of girlhood; marriage in particular is consistently framed as tragic, presented as the end of the relative freedom that girls experience before becoming wives and mothers.

The protagonists of Hana Monogatari range in age from pre-school girls to adult woman. Examples include a girl who chooses to pursue a career in nursing over postsecondary school so that she may help others in Dahlia, a tomboy who runs away from home in Wisteria, a teacher who bullies a student until she drops out of school and has a nervous breakdown in Acacia, and a student who develops a crush on a new music teacher in White Lily. Early stories in Hana Monogatari were often short and didactic, while later stories tended to be longer in length, pessimistic, and tragic; when serialized, these longer stories were occasionally published across two magazine issues.

=== Illustrations ===
Artist Koji Fukiya drew illustrations to accompany entries of Hana Monogatari for its serialization in Shōjo Gahō beginning in December 1920. These illustrations are done in the style of jojōga (lyrical pictures), distinguished by a "dreamy" and "flowery" style made popular by artist Yumeji Takehisa. Jun'ichi Nakahara drew illustrations for the series' reprint in Shōjo no tomo, and also illustrated the covers to the three-volume book edition of the series published in 1939. Other illustrators who contributed to Hana Monogatari were Yoshio Shimizu, whose art accompanied entries during its serialization in Shōjo Gahō, and Fumiko Kametaka.

== Analysis and themes ==
=== Style ===
Masumi lay face-down on the light pink small flowers blossoming on top of the dune, [and] cried sobbingly.
⋯⋯Sakiko-san⋯⋯
She called the name of the person she missed⋯⋯
The night wore on, the moon shone clearly. Lit by the light of the moon, there was only a small harmonica left without owner, shining silvery on the top of that dune where the flowers blossom——Masumi was nowhere to be seen.
In the dark, the sea was from time to time silently turning over white waves.

— Excerpt from Hama Nadeshiko (ハマナデシコ, 'Seashore Pink')

A hallmark of Yoshiya's writing, and of shōjo culture broadly, was her distinctive prose style, known as bibun (lit. 'beautiful writing'). While a fluid and decorative writing style was already an extant feature of shōjo magazines of the early 1900s and 10s (which Yoshiya read and contributed to), bibun combined elements from genbun itchi (the movement to unify spoken and written language style), bibuncho (lit. 'ornate style') and English to develop a distinctive writing style "that is even today immediately identified with Yoshiya's girls' fiction". This style is exemplified in Hana Monogatari, which scholar Deborah Shamoon notes is defined by its "gentle tone of nostalgia, lyrical descriptions of beauty, and polite, feminine diction".

Bibun was the narrative equivalent of jojōga, and both were central in developing the aesthetics of shōjo culture. Traits of bibun that have been observed in Hana Monogatari include its use of long, complex, and ambiguous sentences that convey an emotional and sentimental tone; its repetition of certain words, such as yukashii ('refined'), jojō ('lyrical'), uruwashii ('graceful'), and itamashii ('tragic'); its indirect descriptions of intimacy that leave the inner feelings of the characters to reader interpretation; and a sense of exoticism evoked though frequent Western motifs such as pianos, ribbons, and churches.

An additional distinguishing trait of this prose style is its frequent use of modern text symbols such as "—", "⋯⋯ ", "( )", "!" and "?". These symbols were frequently used by proponents of genbun itchi to simulate the feeling of real speech and thought in their writing. Shamoon notes how many critics have identified Yoshiya's decorative use of punctuation as a distinctive "marker of femininity" in her prose, and considers how these symbols elicit a sense of urgency that make her stories read similarly to poetry. Academic Michiko Suzuki notes how this usage of symbols has been compared to Julia Kristeva's conception of écriture féminine (lit. 'women's writing') but herself compares Yoshiya's usage of text symbols to Gilles Deleuze's notion of "a narrative that stutters". She suggests that Yoshiya's use of grammatically unstable sentences "impl[ies] incompleteness" in a way that underscores both the immaturity of the characters and the temporality of their feelings, while allowing for moments of silence that imply deeper emotions that cannot be articulated.

Hiromi Tsuchiya Dollase argues that these symbols, which she considers as standing in for "overwhelming feelings of sadness and love" within the prose, ultimately "fed readers' shōjo narcissism". She links them to Kristeva's conception of jouissance (lit. 'enjoyment') as the pleasurable senses and feelings experienced by pre-verbal infants, and how these symbols are used to create "sphere of pleasure" which "help[s] girls indulge in narcissistic play".

=== Gender and sexuality ===
Hana Monogatari was published at a time when the doctrine of "good wife, wise mother" (ryōsai kenbo) was dominant in Japanese gender ideology, and while sexuality was increasingly examined through a lens of European sexology that categorized sexual behaviors as either normative or perverse. The frequently tragic endings of Hana Monogatari are often read by critics as a rejection of the social expectation for girls to become ryōsai kenbo, with Suzuki noting how the relationships of the series are "truly terminal in the sense that characters rarely grow up in these stories, refusing to move on to heterosexuality". Hiromi Tsuchiya Dollase similarly considers how this refusal to mature "could be taken as a sign of resistance against their future roles as women", and regards Hana Monogatari as a text that "illustrates the pain of losing the shōjo identity" through marriage or age.

There is a diversity of scholarly interpretations over depictions of sexuality in Hana Monogatari, mirroring the broader lack of scholarly consensus over interpretations of sexuality in shōjo and Class S cultures. Yoshiya was not out in the modern sense of the term during her lifetime, but given the subject material of her writing and that she lived openly with a female partner for forty-seven years, she is often labeled by contemporary scholars as a lesbian writer. Some scholars have expressed skepticism over this approach, with Deborah Shamoon writing that attempts to "resurrect Yoshiya as a feminist or even as a lesbian author [are] deeply problematic" and flatten the nuanced attitudes towards sexuality in shōjo culture.

Michiko Suzuki similarly notes how Yoshiya's stories are frequently considered in an autobiographical context but argues that it "is crucial to recognize that they are constructed through an intricate negotiation with then contemporary ideas about same-sex love" that positions these feelings as "an integral component of female growth and self-completion". She considers how stories in Hana Monogatari embody the then-mainstream view of same-sex attraction as a terminal phenomenon confined to adolescence, while at the same time "resisting simplistic notions of purity, innocence, and the 'normal' transitory relationship". That is to say, Hana Monogatari was able to be published in mainstream publications and reach a mainstream audience by reproducing socially dominant views about the temporal nature of adolescent romantic friendships, but simultaneously "opens up resistant modes of interpretation" that suggest that same-sex attraction can be a phenomenon that endures beyond adolescence.

Elena Paulsen concurs with Suzuki's approach, writing that analysis of Hana Monogatari should not seek to read its romances "as either platonic or queer" but rather should engage "directly with theories about sexuality circulating during the time that Yoshiya was writing". She similarly notes how the series "reiterates mainstream views of same-sex love" as temporal while at the same time challenging "sexological 'truths” and reveal[ing] the inadequacies and gaps within sexology".

=== Comparison to other works ===
Critics have noted how the tendency of Hana Monogatari to "romanticiz[e] distance" to the exclusion of physical expressions of love aligns it with late 19th- and early 20th-century schoolgirl fiction published in the West. Use of sentimentalism in Hana Monogatari has been compared to the use of that convention in late 19th-century American women's fiction, which utilized sentimentalism as a political device to deliver a feminist message.

Researcher and critic Shōichirō Kami has noted the similarity in narrative format between Hana Monogatari and American novelist Louisa May Alcott's short story collection A Garland for Girls, though as Alcott's series had not yet been translated in Japan at the time of Hana Monogatari's original publication, its significance as a direct influence is unclear. Masuko Honda identifies Yosano Akiko's Midaregami (1901) as a major influence on Hana Monogatari, noting their shared usage of flowery prose that "celebrate[s] maidenhood".

== Reception and influence ==
"Women at this time were subordinate to men, be it in the literary world or everyday life. Women were not even allowed to possess their own souls. In the world of Hana Monogatari, such women were treated as protagonists in life, expanding their inner self by developing friendships with other young women."

— Writer and critic Teruko Yoshitake, commenting on Hana Monogatari in 1982

Hana Monogatari is Yoshiya's most famous work and was a bestselling book throughout the prewar period. Its overwhelming commercial success was such that literary critic Hotsumi Ozaki once remarked that Hana Monogatari was "Rakuyōdō’s dorubako" (lit. 'dollar maker' or 'cash cow'). Mariko Inoue accounts for the remarkable success of Hana Monogatari by considering how it "integrate[d] the rising demand for magazines and popular interest in stories about adolescent girls".

The series has been described as among "the most representative and best-known cultural products of early shōjo culture", and established romantic friendships as a core recurring element of shōjo fiction and culture. Writer Seiko Tanabe professed to be an ardent fan of Hana Monogatari and Yoshiya, and the series was the inspiration for Sakae Tsuboi's serial novel Watashi no Hana Monogatari (My Hana Monogatari).

Hana Monogatari was particularly influential on shōjo manga (girls' manga), with artists and writers of the post-war era frequently drawing inspiration from both the series' prose style to write the inner monologue of their characters. Jun'ichi Nakahara's illustrations, exemplified in his contributions to Hana Monogatari, developed what became archetypal shōjo imagery of background motifs dominated by flowers, and girls with large detailed eyes and long limbs. Hana Monogatari has additionally been credited with contributing to the development of a "queer public female culture" in the 1910s and 1920s by "making it possible for queer feelings to permeate the public arena".

Contemporaneous Japanese literary critics often took a low view of popular fiction generally and Hana Monogatari specifically, and criticized the series for its ambiguous and unclear messages, perceived lack of realism, and excessive focus on emotions and sentimentality. Novelist Sakae Tsuboi criticized the stories of Hana Monogatari for being "like lullabies" that make readers "feel good and forget reality", while poet Yosano Akiko indicated her distaste for "cheap stories that try to curry favor with children", writing that "sentimental shōjo stories that attempt to invite cheap tears" like Hana Monogatari were "harmful to society." The story Sazanka ('Camellia'), which depicts hisabetsu buraku (a historically marginalized Japanese social group), was criticized as politically insensitive and accused of invoking images of poverty for emotional effect.

Yoshiya and Hana Monogatari were generally excluded from consideration within Japan's literary canon (Note: Per Shamoon, Yoshiya was "a respected member of the literary elite in the 1930s in spite of her unconventional lifestyle", and posits that her "exclusion from the literary canon is most likely due to bias against popular literature in general and girls’ culture in particular.") until receiving renewed scholarly interest in the 1990s, following the publication of the article "The Genealogy of Hirahira: Liminality and the Girl" by pedagogist Masuko Honda. The article is a reflection on the author's childhood during World War II, where she describes how girls' media like Hana Monogatari permitted an escape from the horrors of war; the article is credited with inspiring renewed academic and literary interest in pre-war shōjo culture, and for establishing shōjo studies as a scholarly field.

== Adaptions ==
Fukujusō, a silent film based on Hana Monogatari, was released in 1935. A manga adaptation of Hana Monogatari written and illustrated by Mari Ozawa was serialized in the manga magazine Cocohana from 2012 to 2014.
