= Shōjo Gahō =

Japanese girls' magazine published 1912–1942

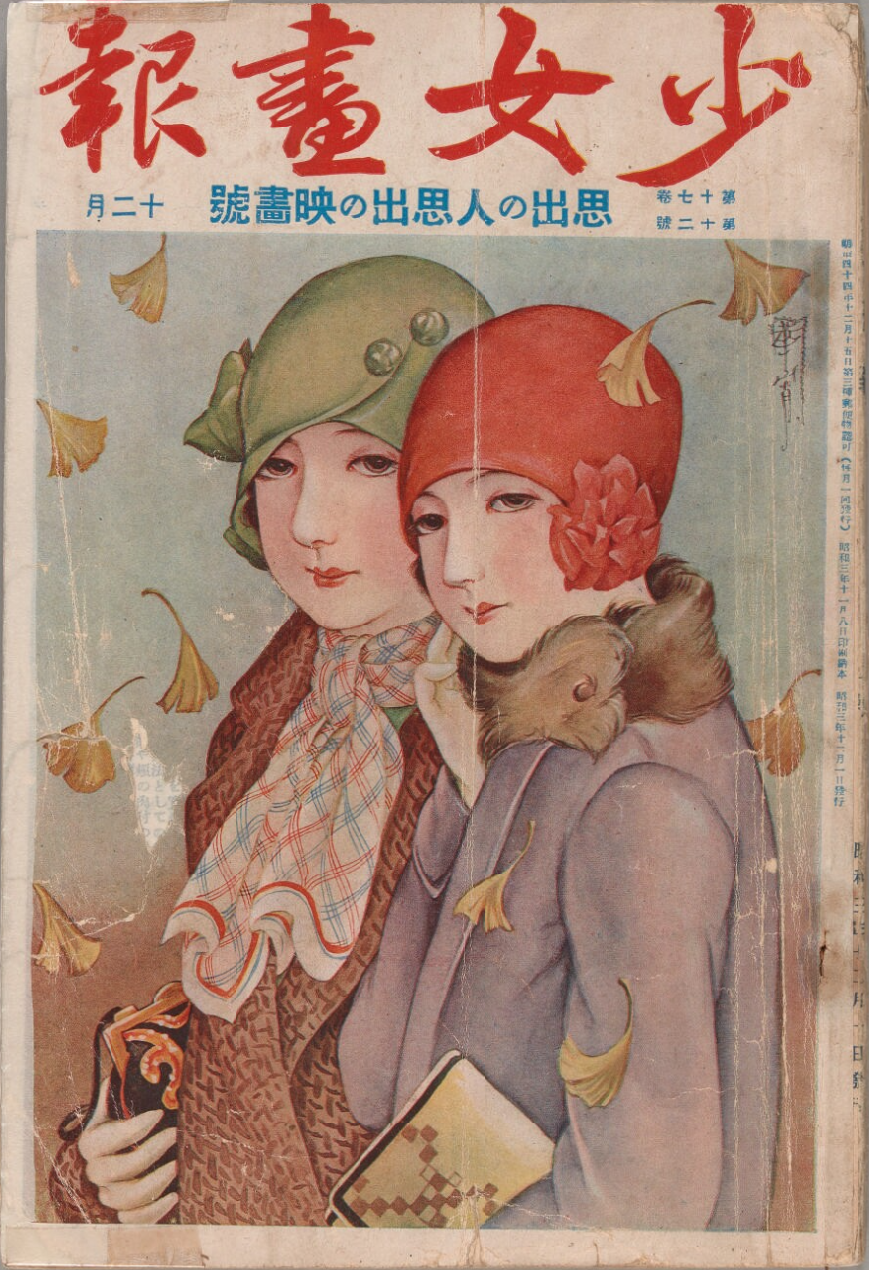
- Front cover of Shōjo Gahō, December issue 1928, vol. 17 no. 12. Cover illustration by Takabatake Kashō.
- Categories: Shōjo magazine, girls' magazine, children's magazine, children's literature
- Frequency: Monthly
- Format: Kikuban: 150×220
- Circulation: 1912–1942
- Publisher: Takami Kyūtarō
- Company: Tōkyōsha
- Country: Japan
- Language: Japanese

Shōjo Gahō (少女画報 (Note: This is a new-style spelling. Originally spelt in old style as 少女畫報 (as in the picture to the right, read horizontally and right to left).); lit. 'Girls' Pictorial') was a monthly shōjo (girls) magazine published by Tōkyōsha in 1912 in Japan. The magazine was known for the series of short stories Hana Monogatari (Flower Tales) written by Yoshiya Nobuko. Popular artists including Takabatake Kashō, Fukiya Kōji and Katsuji Matsumoto also contributed to the illustrations for the magazine. The publication ended in 1942 when it was merged into Shōjo no Tomo.

== Content ==
Shōjo Gahō was printed in the size of a kikuban (150×220) which was typical for a magazine published in this period, and approximately a centimeter thick. The covers were printed in colour and included pages of illustrations by popular artists. Thick photopaper were used for some reproductions, and the inner pages were printed on newsprint paper.

Shōjo Gahō was popular for its use of pictorial depictions, as the name of the magazine emphasises. Including Japanese customs, lifestyle, nature, letters from girls' schools, pictures of readers, Takarazuka stars and social events, the magazine actively introduced visual information and entertainment. The magazine often featured the lives of girls from overseas such as Europe, America, East Asia, India, Africa and Russia. From 1915, images of British girls were featured through prevailing issues under the title "Wartime and the British shōjo". The world was seen through the theme of shōjo.

The "readers' column" was a communicative space for readers commonly seen in shōjo magazines. Shōjo Gahō interacted with readers through letters that sought for professional advice and submissions of creative works of literature and poetry. This section consumed about a quarter of its whole magazine pages. By involving the real voices of the readers, these pages fostered the "imagined community" of the shōjo readership.

== Context ==
In the early twentieth century, the number of girl students increased due to the kōtō-jogakkō-rei (Women's Higher School Act) which was established by the Ministry of Education in 1899 to give girls a necessary secondary education. This act reinforced widening the middle class, and nurture skills for a "Good Wife, Wise Mother".

Initially widely read as an extracurricular media for young women, magazines reflected the intentions of the school education system that were to enforce school girls to become model members of the Japanese society and provide basic ideas and skills of a middle to upper class wife and mother.

== History ==
=== Birth of shōjo magazines ===
Shōjo magazines originate from the shōjo-ran (girls' column), a section that was aimed specifically for girls, in the magazine Shōnen Sekai (Boys' World) in 1895. This small section of a shōnen magazine was the emergence of the term shōjo, as shōnen was not a gender-specific term. It literally meant "young children" until 1900, although the stories were clearly about boys and aimed for boys. With the large popularity of this column, many magazines for girls were launched after the Russo-Japanese War (1904–1905).

The first shōjo magazines that were published were Shōjokai (Girls' Circle) published in 1902 by Kinkōdoō and Shōjo Sekai (Girls' World) published in 1906 by Hakubunkan. Yet the two magazines ended shortly in 1912 and 1931 respectively. The magazines that were particularly notable for their influences on shōjo culture were Shōjo no Tomo (Girls' Friend) published by Jitsugyō no Nihonsha in 1908, Shōjo Gahō published by Tōkyōsha in 1912, and Shōjo Kurabu (Girls' Club) published by Kōdansha in 1923, all of which remaining published until the Pacific War. These magazines were targeted towards teenage girls, and represented and enhanced the sense of girl community through articles, literature and illustrations.

Shōjo magazines that were published in this period provided young women with moral guidance, to live a modest life and work hard. Yet shōjo magazines gradually presented a shift from the previous emphasis on the educational purpose. While the main aims remained to educate girls to become a model national citizen, there was a visible shift to the consideration of higher magazine popularity and circulation. The editors aimed for a magazine that could sell better, while maintaining its main purpose to nurture the skills of a mother and a wife to young women. At least 14 magazines including the term shōjo in the title being in published. The shōjo became a marketing category from this period, remaining as a distinct field until today.

=== 1912–1937 ===
In 1912, Shōjo Gahō was published from Tōkyōsha founded by Takami Kyūtarō, also known for his later children's magazine Kodomo no kuni (Children's World). The magazine was published after the success of Kōzoku Gahō (Royal Pictorial), a magazine which was temporarily published as a special issue for Fujin Gahō.

From 1916 to 1924 Yoshiya Nobuko (1896–1973) published Hana Monogatari in Shōjo Gahō. The first story "Suzuran" (Lily of the Valley) was an instant sensation, entertaining girls with the poetic and melancholic stories of school girls. Kitagawa Chiyo (1894–1965) who was also an important figure in the girls' literature scene, published Kōfuku (Happiness) in 1925. Illustrations by artists such as Kashō, Fukiya Kōji and Matsumoto Katsuji often appeared in the magazine, and their Images of young women wearing an elegant kimono or an extravagant Western dress contributed in establishing the discourse of the shōjo.

=== 1937–1942 ===
After 1937, shōjo magazines began depicting messages that reflected wartime national priorities. Emphasis on national unity and self-restraint became apparent in popular culture and in shōjo magazines. In 1938, the government issued the Joint Opinion on the Purification of Children's Reading Materials. Shōjo magazines were under the target of regulation, censored in order to promote spiritual education to the Japanese citizens including children. Illustrations of girls by artists including Kashō did not match the wartime expectation of a girl, resulting in eliminations of the illustrations. From 1940, the publishing industry was under stronger government control, resulting in cessation and consolidation of shōjo magazines. The only shōjo magazines that continued after the war were Shōjo Club and Shōjo no Tomo that merged with Shōjo Gahō in 1942.

== Notable contributors ==
=== Writers ===
==== Yoshiya Nobuko (1896–1973): Hana monogatari (Flower Tales) ====
Yoshiya Nobuko was notable for her work Hana monogatari which was first published in Shōjo Gahō. The first story she published was "Suzuran" (Lily of the Valley) in 1916. The sentimental language and tone became instantly popular among the readers. Although it was not initially planned to be a series, with its huge success, being requested by the chief editor Wada Kokō, Yoshiya continued to publish her works on the magazine to be serialised as Hana monogatari. Each short story had a title with a name of a flower. The stories often took place in a mission school, about two girls and their friendship, known as the "S relationship" (sister relationship).

==== Kitagawa Chiyo (1894–1965): "Kōfuku" (Happiness) ====
As opposed to Yoshiya who wrote sentimental fantasy stories that evolved around the shōjo characters, Kitagawa wrote stories that revealed the harsh reality of the world. "Kōfuku" depicted the existence of social order through a school girl's perspective.

=== Artists ===
==== Takabatake Kashō (1888–1966) ====
Kashō established his unique and modern artistic style through combining aspects of the Art Nouveau and nihonga. After he finished his exclusive contract with Kōdansha, he started creating many illustrations for magazines including Shōjo Gahō. His illustrations that depicted girls often in pairs, one in a kimono and the other in a Western dress, evoked the S relationships that were expressed in stories published in the magazine.

==== Fukiya Kōji (1898–1979) ====
Fukiya started working for Shōjo Gahō through his connection with Takehisa Yumeji. The illustrations he created for Yoshiya's Hana monogatari him a popular artist. His shōjo illustrations matched with the story, which evoked the style of Takehisa's jojōga that depicted weak and dreamy images of the shōjo.

== Archive collections ==
The following institutions hold original copies of Shōjo Gahō:

- International Library of Children's Literature, National Diet Library, Tokyo
- Tokyo Metropolitan Library, Tokyo
- The Museum of Modern Japanese Literature, Tokyo
- Yayoi Museum, Tokyo
- Shōwa Women's University Library, Tokyo
- Kanagawa Museum of Modern Japanese Literature, Kanagawa
- Koga History Museum, Ibaraki
- Center for International Children's Literature, Osaka Prefectural Central Library, Osaka
- Kikuyō Town Library, Kumamoto (Digital Collection)
