= Shōjo shōsetsu =

Japanese popular fiction genre

Shōjo shōsetsu (Japanese: 少女小説; lit. "girls' novel") is a genre of Japanese popular fiction aimed at an audience of girls that emerged in the early 20th century. The genre has been published across literary formats, including novels, short stories, essays, and memoirs. It is typically divided into four subcategories that correspond to chronological periods:

- Japanese translations of foreign literary classics aimed at girls, e.g. A Little Princess by Frances Hodgson Burnett;
- Prose fiction published in shōjo magazines of the early 20th century, e.g. Hana Monogatari by Nobuko Yoshiya;
- Junior shōsetsu (ジュニア小説; lit. "youth novel") of the 1960s and 1970s, e.g. the works of Seiko Tanabe;
- Light novels published in shōjo fiction magazines such as Cobalt, e.g. the works of Saeko Himuro.
