= Kashō Museum =

The Kasho Museum
- 高畠華宵大正ロマン館
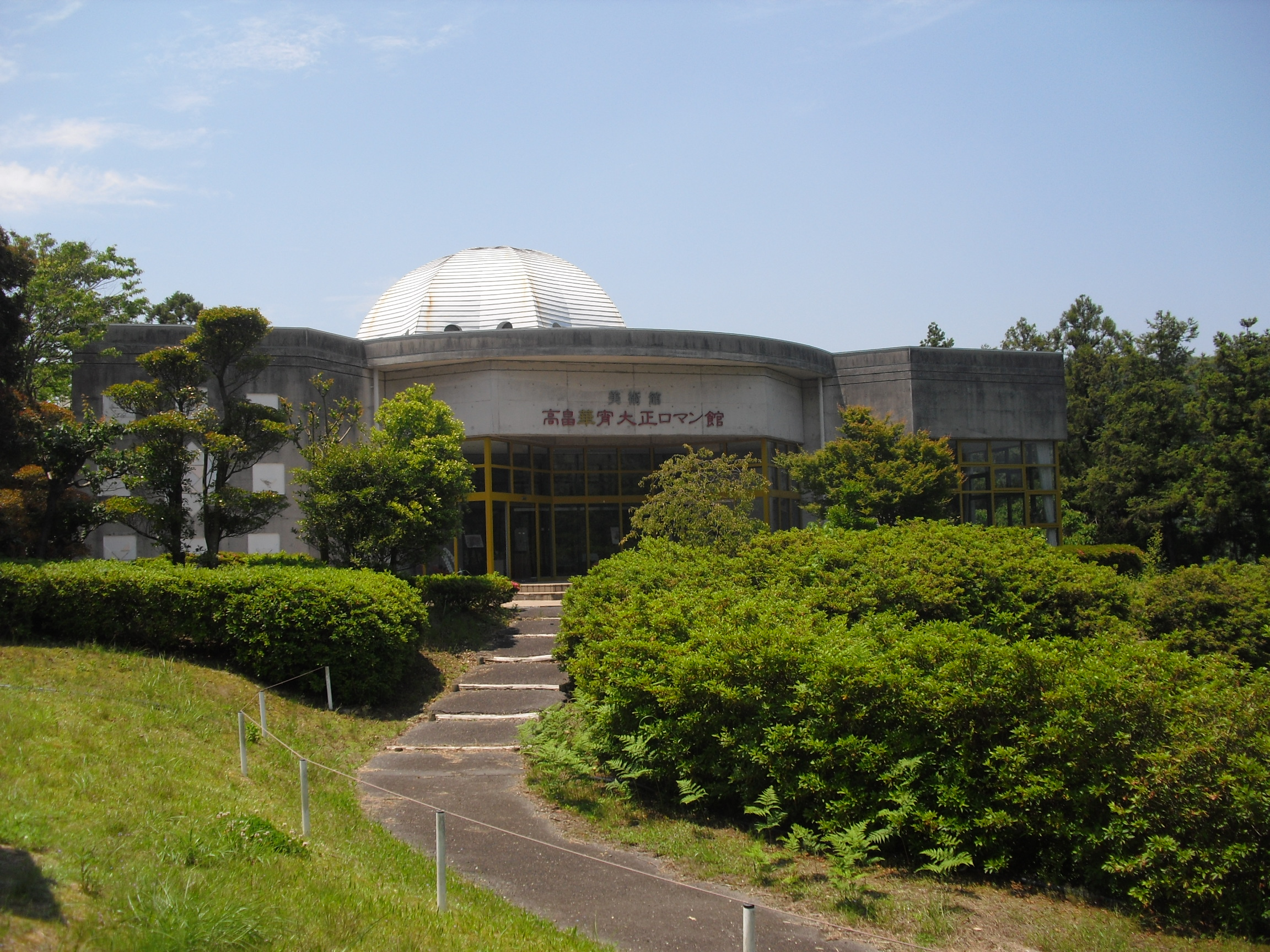
- Interactive map of the The Kasho Museum area

General information
- Location: 654-1 Shimobayashihei, Tōon, Ehime Prefecture, Japan
- Coordinates: 33°46′08″N 132°53′08″E
- Opened: 1990

Website
- Official website (ja)

The Kasho Museum (高畠華宵大正ロマン館, Takabatake Kashō Taishō Roman-kan) is a private museum that opened in Tōon, Ehime Prefecture, Japan, in 1990. The collection includes some 4,300 works (paintings, drawings, illustrations, etc.) by Takabatake Kashō (1888–1966), who was born in Uwajima, hundreds of his letters, photographs, and personal effects, works by contemporaries, and other items from the Taishō and early Shōwa eras.

== See also ==
- Shōjo Gahō
