= Shōjo manga =

Manga aimed at a teenage female readership

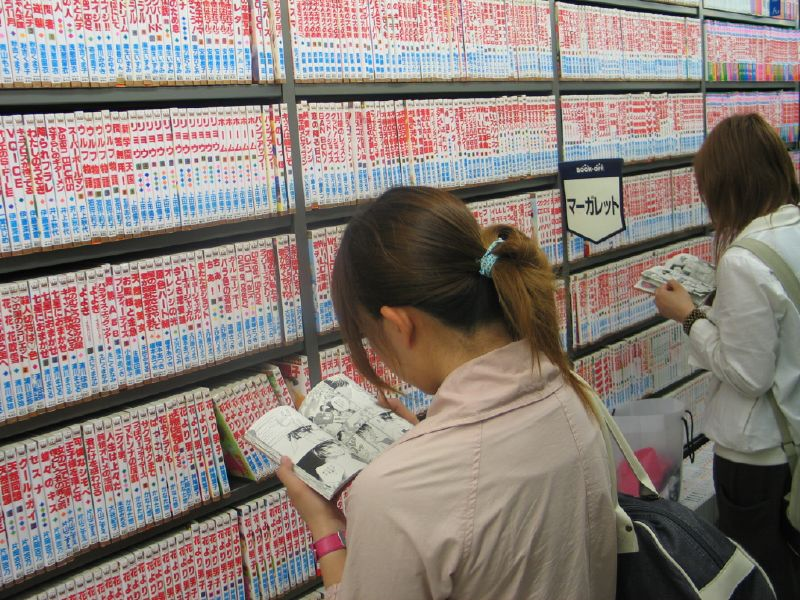
Shelves of collected volumes of shōjo manga under the Margaret Comics imprint at a bookstore in Tokyo in 2004

Shōjo manga (少女漫画; lit. 'girls' comics', also romanized as shojo or shoujo) is an editorial category of Japanese comics targeting an audience of adolescent girls and young adult women. It is, along with shōnen manga (targeting adolescent boys), seinen manga (targeting young adult and adult men), and josei manga (targeting adult women), one of the primary editorial categories of manga. Shōjo manga is traditionally published in dedicated manga magazines, which often specialize in a particular readership age range or narrative genre.

Shōjo manga originated from Japanese girls' culture at the turn of the twentieth century, primarily shōjo shōsetsu (girls' prose novels) and jojōga (lyrical paintings). The earliest shōjo manga was published in general magazines aimed at teenagers in the early 1900s and began a period of creative development in the 1950s as it began to formalize as a distinct category of manga. While the category was initially dominated by male manga artists, the emergence and eventual dominance of female artists beginning in the 1960s and 1970s led to significant creative innovation and the development of more graphically and thematically complex stories. Since the 1980s, the category has developed stylistically while simultaneously branching into different and overlapping subgenres.

Strictly speaking, shōjo manga does not refer to a specific style or a genre but rather indicates a target demographic. While certain aesthetic, visual, and narrative conventions are associated with shōjo manga, these conventions have changed and evolved over time, and none are strictly exclusive to shōjo manga. Nonetheless, several concepts and themes have come to be typically associated with shōjo manga, both visual (non-rigid panel layouts, highly detailed eyes) and narrative (a focus on human relations and emotions; characters that defy traditional roles and stereotypes surrounding gender and sexuality; depictions of supernatural and paranormal subjects).

== Terminology ==
=== Shōjo ===
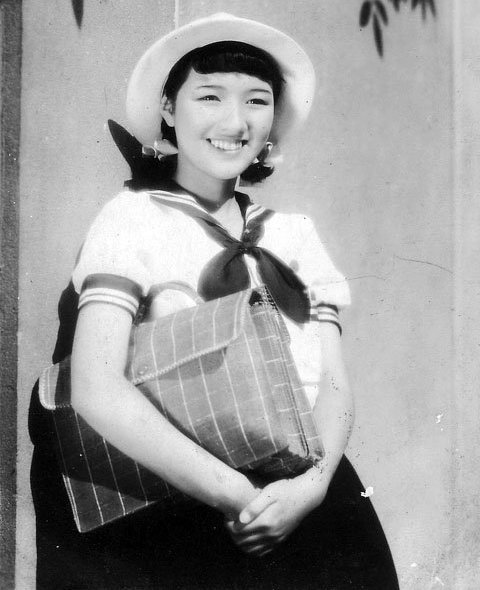
Actress Hideko Takamine, portraying an archetypal shōjo wearing a sailor fuku in the 1939 film Hana Tsumi Nikki

The Japanese word shōjo (少女) translates literally to "girl", but in common Japanese usage girls are generally referred to as onna no ko (女の子) and rarely as shōjo. Rather, the term shōjo is used to designate a social category that emerged during the Meiji era (1868–1912) of girls and young women at the age between childhood and marriage. Generally this referred to school-aged adolescents, with whom an image of "innocence, purity and cuteness" was associated; this contrasted the moga ("modern girl", young unmarried working women), with whom a more self-determined and sexualized image was associated. Shōjo continued to be associated with an image of youth and innocence after the end of the Meiji era, but took on a strong consumerist connotation beginning in the 1980s as it developed into a distinct marketing category for girls; the gyaru (ギャル) also replaced the moga as the archetypical independent woman during this period.

=== Shōjo manga ===
Strictly speaking, shōjo manga does not refer to a specific style or a genre, but rather indicates a target demographic. The Japanese manga market is segmented by target readership, with the major categories divided by gender (shōjo for girls, shōnen for boys) and by age (josei for women, seinen for men). Thus, shōjo manga is typically defined as manga marketed to an audience of adolescent girls and young adult women, though shōjo manga is also read by men and older women.

Shōjo manga is traditionally published in dedicated manga magazines that are directed at a readership of shōjo, an audience that emerged in the early 20th century and which has grown and diversified over time. While the style and tone of the stories published in these magazines varies across publications and decades, an invariant characteristic of shōjo manga has been a focus on human relations and the emotions that accompany them. Some critics, such as Kyoto International Manga Museum curator Kayoko Kuramochi and academic Masuko Honda, emphasize certain graphic elements when attempting to define shōjo manga: the imaginative use of flowers, ribbons, fluttering dresses, girls with large sparkling eyes, and words that string across the page, which Honda describes using the onomatopoeia hirahira. This definition accounts for works that exist outside the boundaries of traditional shōjo magazine publishing but which nonetheless are perceived as shōjo, such as works published on the Internet.

== History ==
=== Before 1945: Context and origins ===
==== Origins of shōjo culture ====
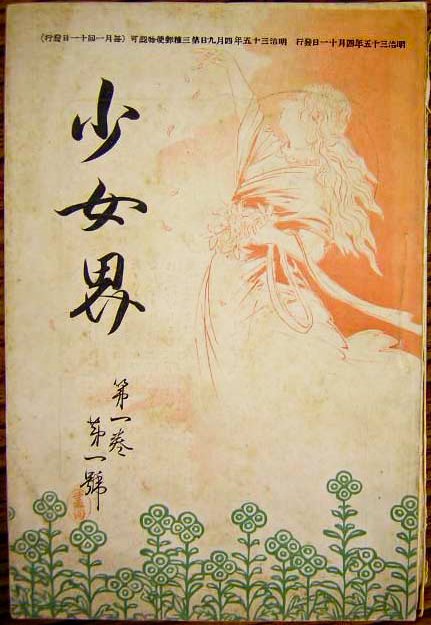
Cover of the first issue of Shōjo-kai, 1902

As the Japanese publishing industry boomed during the Meiji era, new magazines aimed at a teenage audience began to emerge, referred to as shōnen. While these magazines were ostensibly unisex, in practice the editorial content of these magazines largely concerned topics that were of interest to boys. Faced with growing demand for magazines aimed at girls, the first shōjo magazines were published, and shōnen magazines came to target boys exclusively. The first exclusively shōjo magazine was Shōjo-kai, first published in 1902. This was followed by Shōjo Sekai in 1906, Shōjo no Tomo in 1908, Shōjo Gahō in 1912, and Shōjo Club in 1923. These magazines focused primarily on shōjo shōsetsu (lit. "girls' novel", a term for illustrated novels and poems aimed at an audience of girls) and only incidentally on manga.

Shōjo shōsetsu nevertheless played an important role in establishing a shōjo culture, and laid the foundations for what would become the major recurrent themes of shōjo manga through their focus on stories of love and friendship. Among the most significant authors of this era was Nobuko Yoshiya, a major figure in the Class S genre whose novels such as Hana Monogatari centered on romantic friendships between girls and women. The visual conventions of shōjo manga were also heavily influenced by the illustrations published in these magazines, with works by illustrators Yumeji Takehisa, Jun'ichi Nakahara, and Kashō Takabatake featuring female figures with slender bodies, fashionable clothing, and large eyes. Japanese artists who studied in France at the time were influenced by the methods of expression of Art Nouveau and early pin-up artists.

==== Early shōjo manga ====
Early shōjo manga took the form of short, humorous stories with ordinary settings (such as schools and neighborhoods) and which often featured tomboy protagonists. These works began to develop in the 1930s through the influence of artists such as Suihō Tagawa and Shosuke Kurakane; this period saw some female shōjo artists, such as Machiko Hasegawa and Toshiko Ueda, though they were significantly less common than male artists.

Among the most influential artists of this era was Katsuji Matsumoto, a lyrical painter influenced in moga culture and the artistic culture of the United States. Having grown tired of depicting typical innocent shōjo subjects in his illustrations, he pivoted to drawing manga in the 1920s, where he was able to depict moga and tomboys more freely. His style, likely influenced by American comic book artists like George McManus and Ethel Hays and American cinema of the era, introduced sophisticated and avant-garde innovations in shōjo manga, such as the art deco-inspired Poku-chan (1930), the cinematic Nazo no Kurōbā (1934), and his most famous work Kurukuru Kurumi-chan (1938).

With the outbreak of the Second Sino-Japanese War in 1937, censorship and paper rationing hindered the development of magazines, which either folded or were forced to merge to survive. The magazines that continued to published were reduced to a few pages of black and white text, with few or no illustrations. 41 total magazines remained in publication in 1945, two of which were shōjo magazines: Shōjo Club and Shōjo no Tomo.

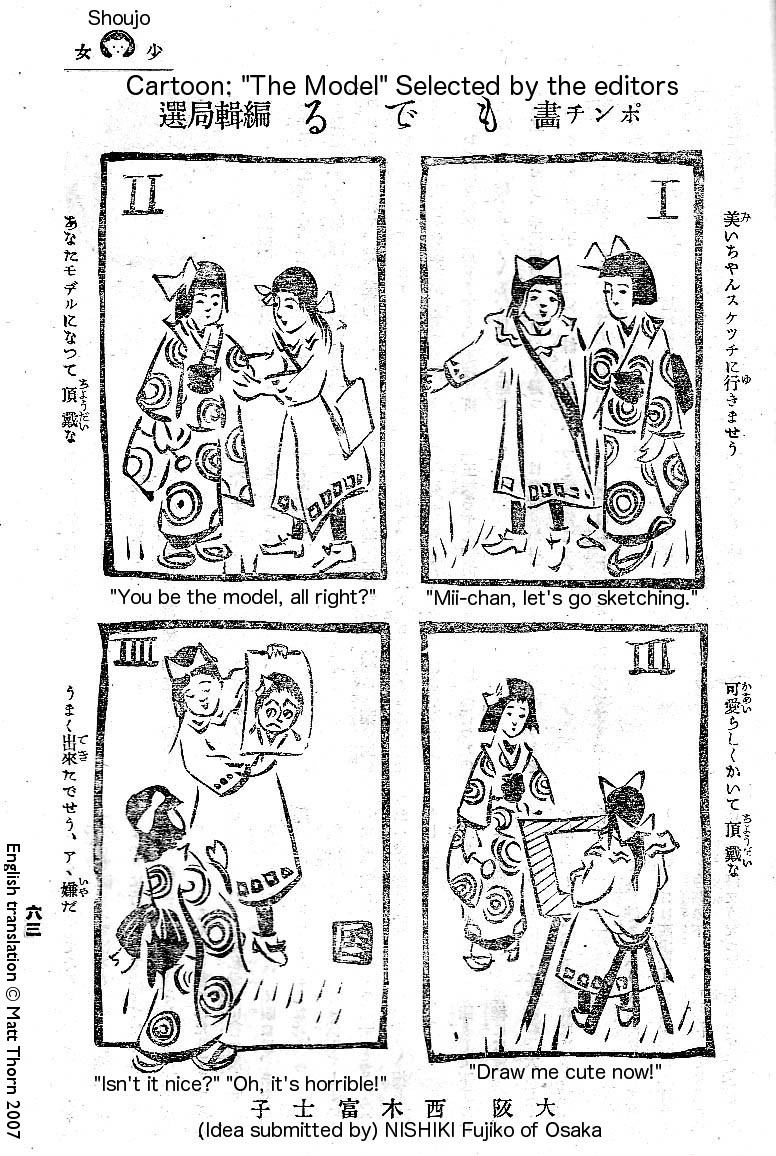
A four-panel manga from the November 1910 issue of Shōjo (artist unknown). Note the henohenomoheji in the final panel.

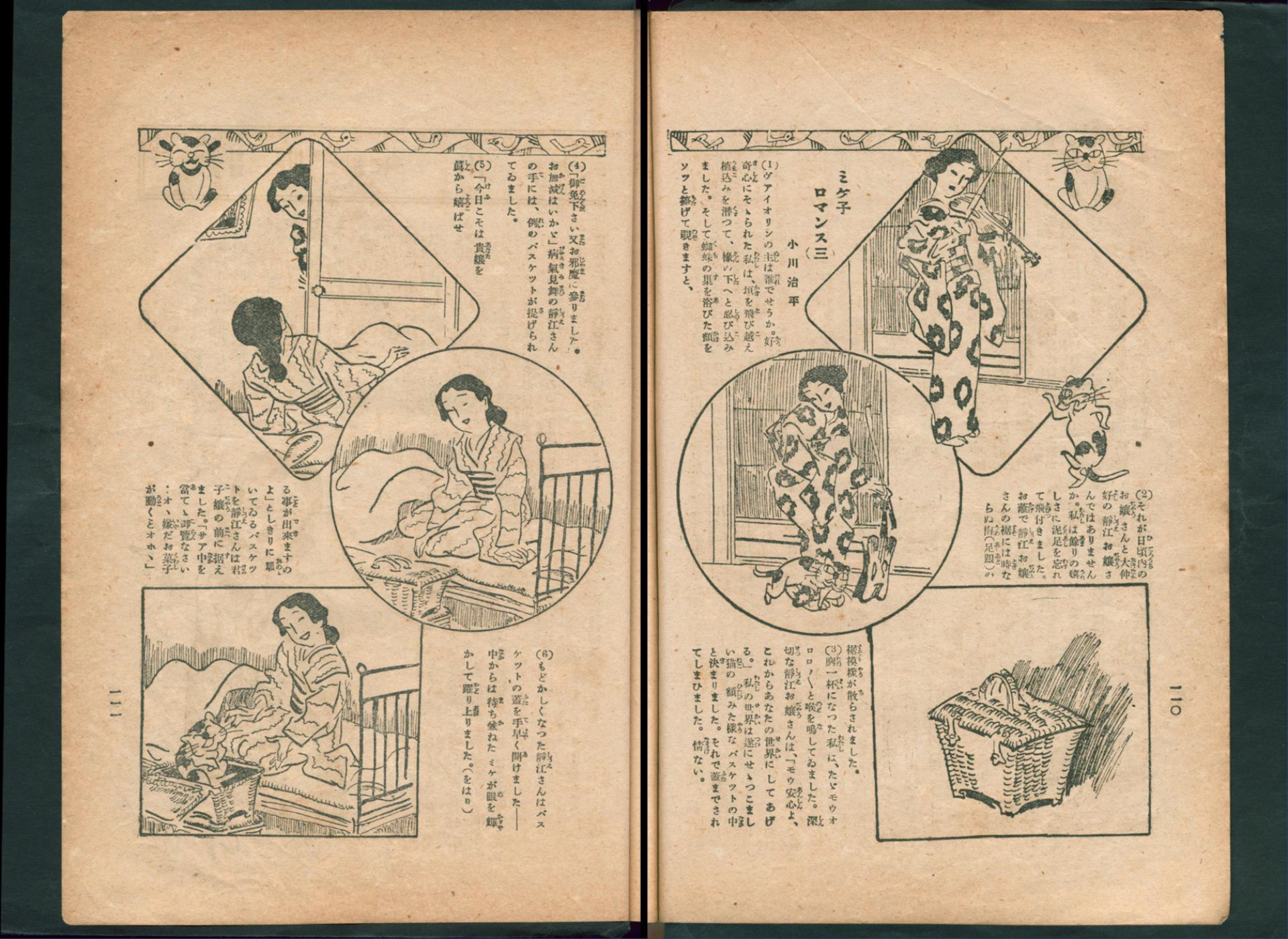
The third chapter of Mikeko Romance (ミケ子ロマンス) by Jihei Ogawa, in the July 1920 issue of Shōjo Gahō

=== 1945–1970: Post-war rise ===
==== 1950s: Formalization as a category ====
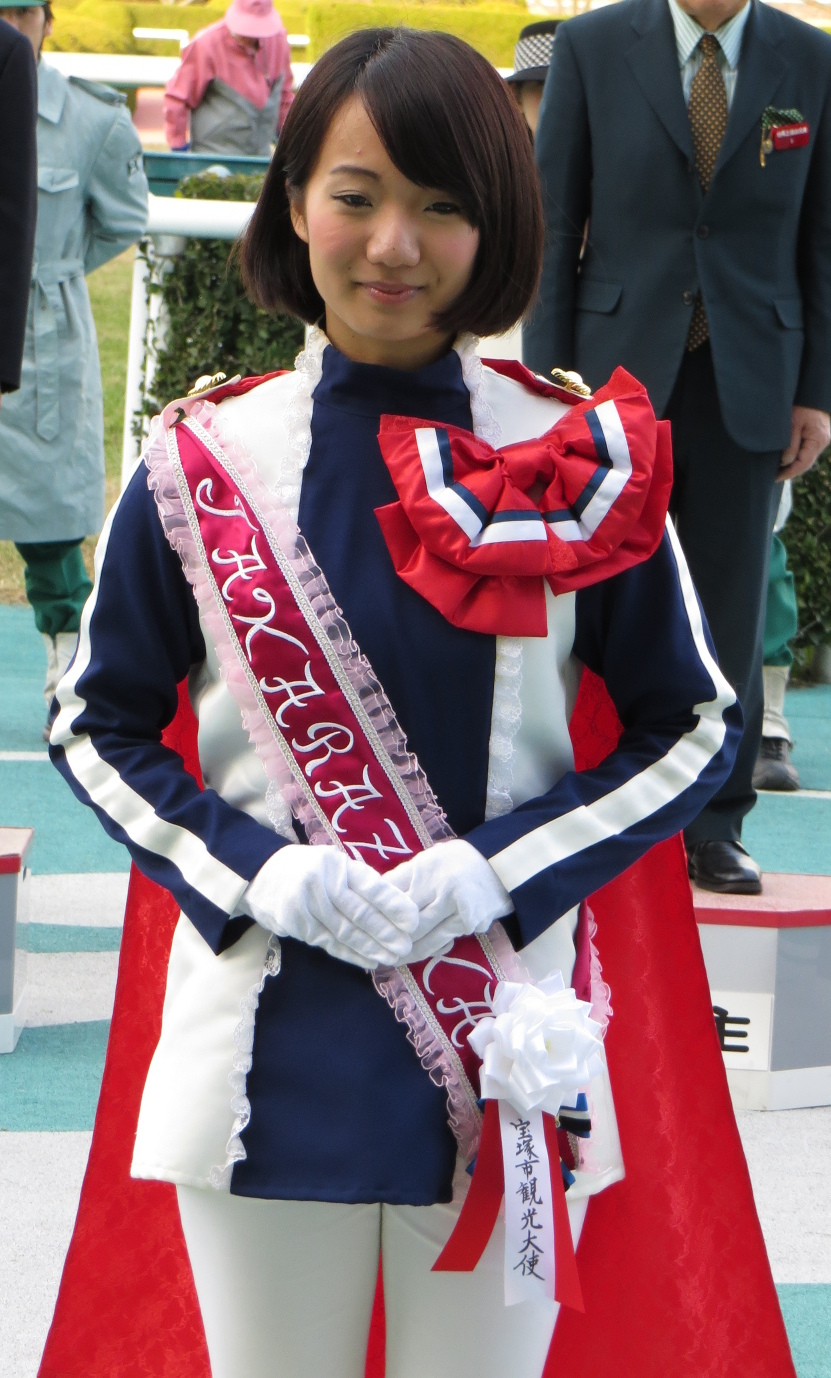
An ambassador for the city of Takarazuka dressed as the titular character from Princess Knight in 2012

With the end of the war, Japan entered into a period of large-scale artistic production in cinema, radio, and publishing. Fiction novels enjoyed a surge of popularity, while the number of published magazines grew from 41 in 1945 to 400 by 1952; the number of publishing companies grew from 300 to roughly 2000 during the same period. While not all of theses magazines and companies published children's literature, publications for children constituted a significant percentage of publishing output. Contemporaneously, kashi-hon (book rental stores) experienced a boom in popularity. These stores rented books for a modest fee of five to ten yen, roughly equivalent to half the cost of a subway ticket at the time. This had the effect of widening access to books among the general public and spurring additional manga publishing.

Shōjo manga artists who had been active prior to the war returned to the medium, including Shosuke Kurakane with Anmitsu Hime (1949–1955), Toshiko Ueda with Fuichin-san (1957–1962), and Katsuji Matsumoto resuming publication of Kurukuru Kurumi-chan. During this period, Matsumoto developed his art into a style that began to resemble the kawaii aesthetic that would emerge several decades later. New manga artists, such as Osamu Tezuka and other artists associated with Tokiwa-sō, created works that introduced intense drama and serious themes to children's manga using a new format that had become popular in shōnen manga: the "story manga", which depicted multi-chapter narratives with continuity rather than a succession of essentially independent vignettes. Princess Knight (1953–1956) by Tezuka is credited with introducing this type of narrative, along with Tezuka's innovative and dynamic style, to shōjo magazines.

At the same time, shōjo on the kashi-hon market developed its own distinct style through the influence of jojōga (lyrical painting). Jojōga artists Yukiko Tani and Macoto Takahashi drew cover illustrations for shōjo manga anthologies such as Niji and Hana before transitioning into drawing manga themselves. Rather than following Matsumoto's trajectory of moving away from the visual conventions of lyrical painting, Tani and Takahashi imported them into their manga, with works defined by a strong sense of atmosphere and a focus on the emotions rather than the actions of their protagonists. Takahashi's manga series Arashi o Koete (1958) was a major success upon its release, and marked the beginnings of this jojōga-influenced style eclipsing Tezuka's dynamic style as the dominant visual style of shōjo manga. Not all kashi-hon shōjo conformed to this lyrical style: one of the most popular shōjo kashi-hon anthologies was Kaidan (怪談; lit. "Ghost Stories"), which launched in 1958 and ran for more than one hundred monthly issues. As its name implies, the anthology published supernatural stories focused on yūrei and yōkai. Its success with female readers resulted in other generalist shōjo anthologies beginning to publish horror manga, laying the groundwork for what would become a significant subgenre of shōjo manga.

As manga became generally more popular over the course of the decade, the proportion of manga published by shōjo magazines began to increase. For example, while manga represented only 20 percent of the editorial content of Shōjo Club in the mid-1950s, by the end of the decade it composed more than half. Many shōjo magazines had in effect became manga magazines, and several companies launched magazines dedicated exclusively to shōjo manga: first Kodansha in 1954 with Nakayoshi, followed by Shueisha in 1955 with Ribon. From this combination of light-hearted stories inherited from the pre-war era, dramatic narratives introduced by the Tokiwa-sō, and cerebral works developed on the kashi-hon market, shōjo manga of this period was divided by publishers into three major categories: kanashii manga (かなしい漫画; lit. "sad manga"), yukai na manga (ゆかいな漫画; lit. "happy manga"), and kowai manga (こわい漫画; lit. "scary manga").

==== 1960s: Emergence of female artists ====
In the 1950s, shōjo manga was a genre that was created primarily by male authors, notably Leiji Matsumoto, Shōtarō Ishinomori, Kazuo Umezu, and Tetsuya Chiba. Though some creators (notably Tezuka, Ishinomori, and Umezu) created works focused on active heroines, most shōjo stories of this era were typically focused on tragic and passive heroines who bravely endured adversity. Beside Toshiko Ueda, several female manga artists started working during the 1950s, notably Hideko Mizuno, Miyako Maki, Masako Watanabe and Eiko Hanamura, most of them debuted within the kashi-hon anthology Izumi (泉). While they constituted a minority of shōjo manga creators, the editorial departments of magazines noted that their works were more popular with female readers than works created by their male peers.

By the 1960s, the ubiquity of television in Japanese households and the rise of serialized television programs emerged as a significant competitor to magazines. Many monthly magazines folded and were replaced by weekly magazines, such as Shōjo Friend and Margaret. To satisfy the need for weekly editorial content, magazines introduced contests in which readers could submit their manga for publication; female artists dominated these contests, and many amateur artists who emerged from these contests went on to have professional manga careers. The first artist to emerge from this system was Machiko Satonaka, who at the age of 16 had debut manga Pia no Shōzō ("Portrait of Pia", 1964) published in Shōjo Friend.

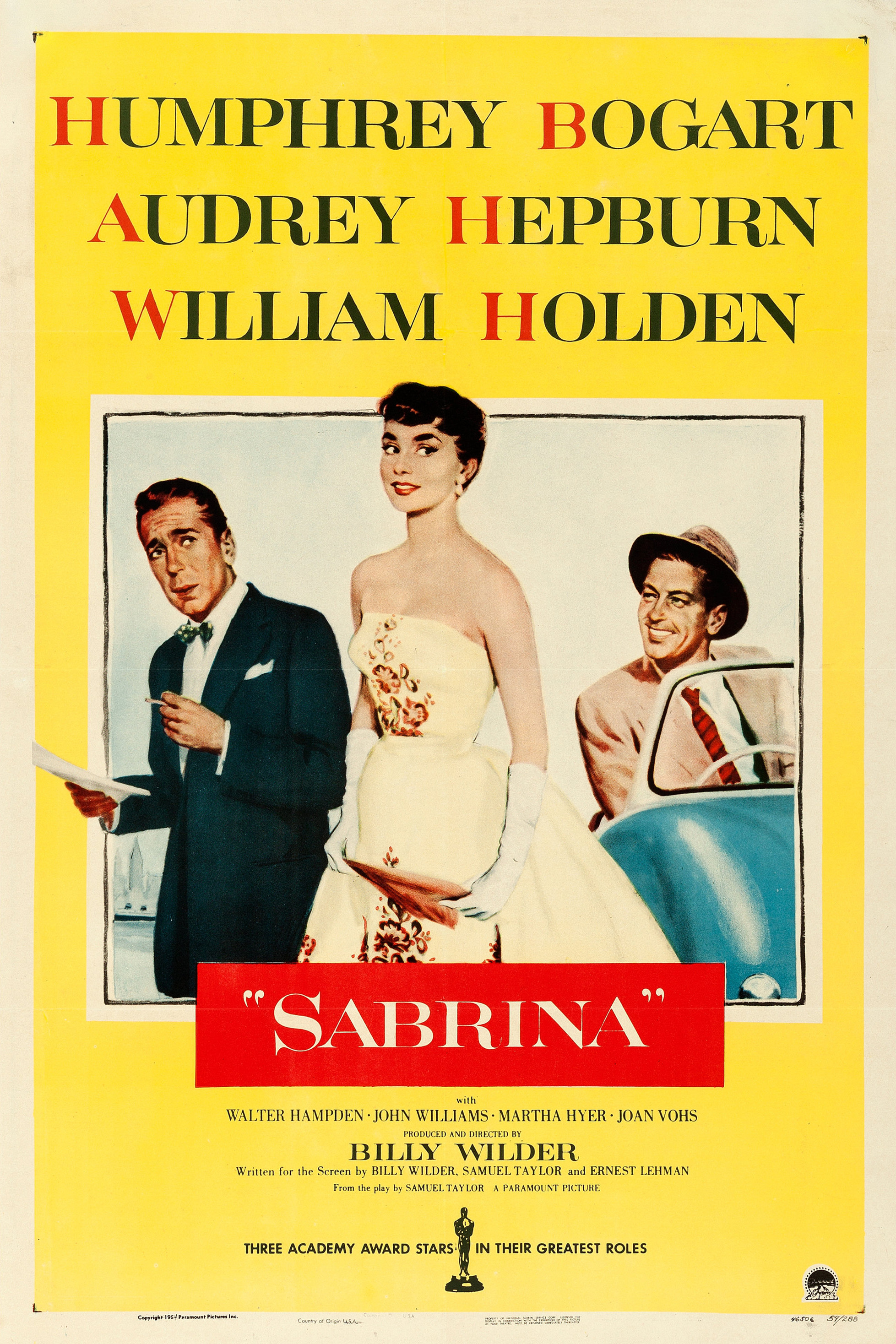
Shōjo manga of the 1960s was influenced by American romantic comedy films, such as Sabrina (1954), which was adapted into a manga in 1963.

The emergence of female artists led to the development of roma-kome (romantic comedy) manga, historically an unpopular genre among male shōjo artists. Hideko Mizuno was the first to introduce romantic comedy elements to shōjo manga through her manga adaptions of American romantic comedy films: Sabrina in 1963 as Sutekina Cora, and The Quiet Man in 1966 as Akage no Scarlet. Other artists, such as Masako Watanabe, Chieko Hosokawa, and Michiko Hosono similarly created manga based on American romantic comedy films, or which were broadly inspired by western actresses and models and featured western settings. Contemporaneously, artists such as Yoshiko Nishitani became popular for rabu-kome (literally "love comedy") manga, focused on protagonists who were ordinary Japanese teenaged girls, with a narrative focus on themes of friendship, family, school, and love.

While early romance shōjo manga was almost invariably simple and conventional love stories, over time and through the works of manga artists such as Machiko Satonaka and Yukari Ichijō, the genre adopted greater narrative and thematic complexity. This gradual maturity came to be reflected in other subgenres: horror manga artist Kazuo Umezu broke shōjo artistic conventions by depicting female characters who were ugly, frightening, and grotesque in his 1965 series Reptilia published in Shōjo Friend, which led to more shōjo artists depicting darker and taboo subject material in their work. Shōjo sports manga, such as Chikako Urano's Attack No. 1 (1968–1970), began to depict physically active rather than passive female protagonists. In 1969, the first shōjo manga sex scene was published in Hideko Mizuno's Fire! (1969–1971).

By the end of the decade, most shōjo magazines now specialized in manga, and no longer published their previous prose literature and articles. As the kashi-hon declined, so too did their manga anthologies; most folded, with their artists and writers typically migrating to manga magazines. Most shōjo manga artists were women, and the category had developed a unique visual identity that distinguished it from shōnen manga.

=== 1970s: "Golden age" ===
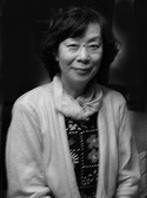
Moto Hagio, a major figure associated with the Year 24 Group, in 2008

By the early 1970s, most shōjo manga artists were women, though editorial positions at shōjo manga magazines remained male-dominated. Over the course of the decade, shōjo manga became more graphically and thematically complex, as it came to reflect the prevailing attitudes of the sexual revolution and women's liberation movement. This movement towards narratively complex stories is associated with the emergence of a new generation of shōjo artists collectively referred to as the Year 24 Group, which included Moto Hagio, Keiko Takemiya, Yumiko Ōshima, and numerous others. Works of the Year 24 Group focused on the internal psychology of their characters, and introduced new genres to shōjo manga such as adventure fiction, science fiction, fantasy, and historical drama. The art style of the Group, influenced by Machiko Satonaka and Yukari Ichijō, came to pioneer new visual standards for shōjo manga: finer and lighter lines, beautiful faces that bordered on exaggeration, and panels that overlapped or were entirely borderless.

Numerous artists contributed to innovation in shōjo manga during the 1970s. Takemiya and Hagio originated a new genre, shōnen-ai (male-male romance), with Takemiya's Sunroom Nite (1970) and Hagio's The November Gymnasium (1971). The historical drama The Rose of Versailles (1972–1973) by Riyoko Ikeda became the first major critical and commercial success in shōjo manga; the series was groundbreaking in its portrayal of gender and sexuality, and was influential in its depiction of bishōnen (literally "beautiful boys"), a term for androgynous male characters. Ako Mutsu and Mariko Iwadate led a new trend of otomechikku manga. While works of the Year 24 Group were defined by their narrative complexity, otomechikku manga focused on the ordinary lives of teenaged Japanese protagonists. The genre waned in popularity by the end of the decade, but its narrative and visual style made a lasting impact on shōjo manga, particularly the emergent aesthetic of kawaii. Veteran shōjo artists such as Miyako Maki and Hideko Mizuno began developing new manga for their formerly child-aged readers who were now adults. Although their attempts were commercially unsuccessful, with short-lived magazines such as Papillon (パピヨン) at Futabasha in 1972, their works were the origins of ladies comics before the category's formal emergence in the early 1980s.

By the end of the 1970s, the three largest publishing houses in Japan (Kodansha, Shogakukan, and Shueisha) as well as Hakusensha established themselves as the largest publishers of shōjo manga, and maintained this dominant position in the decades that followed. The innovation of shōjo manga throughout the decade attracted the attention of manga critics, who had previously ignored shōjo manga or regarded it as unserious, but who now declared that shōjo manga had entered its "golden age". This critical attention attracted a male audience to shōjo manga who, although a minority of overall shōjo readers, remained as an audience for the category.

=== 1980s and 1990s: Subgenre development ===
Since the 1970s, shōjo manga has continued to develop stylistically while simultaneously branching out into different but overlapping subgenres. This development began with a shift in characters and settings: while foreign characters and settings were common in the immediate post-war period, stories began to be set in Japan more frequently as the country began to re-assert an independent national identity. Meiji University professor Yukari Fujimoto writes that beginning in the 1990s, shōjo manga became concerned with self-fulfillment. She intimates that the Gulf War influenced the development of female characters "who fight to protect the destiny of a community", such as Red River (1995–2002), Basara (1990–1998), Magic Knight Rayearth (1993–1996), and Sailor Moon (1991–1997). Fujimoto opines that the shōjo manga of the 1990s depicted emotional bonds between women as stronger than the bonds between a man and a woman.

==== "Ladies comics" and shōjo for adults ====
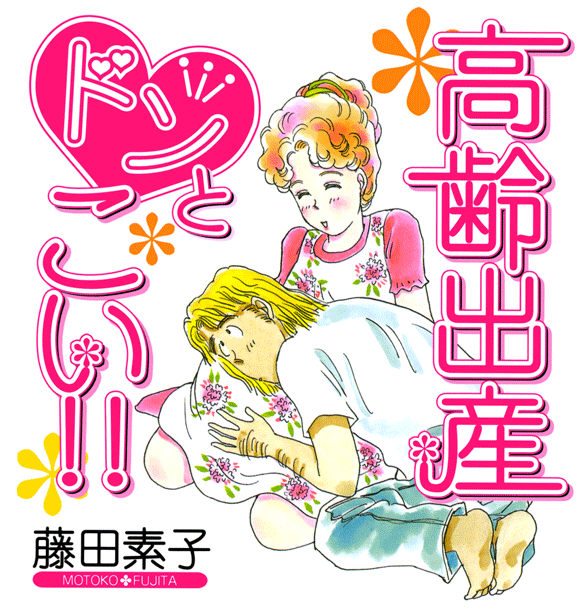
Cover illustration to the josei manga series Kōrei Shussan Don to Koi!! by Motoko Fujita, an autobiography chronicling the author's pregnancy at the age of 43

In 1980, Kodansha published Be Love as the first manga magazine aimed at an audience of adult women. It was quickly followed by a wave of similar magazines, including Feel Young at Kodansha, Judy at Shogakukan, and You, Young You and Office You at Shueisha. This category of manga, referred to as "ladies' comics" or josei manga, shares many common traits with shōjo manga, with the primary distinguishing exception of a focus on adult protagonists rather than teenaged or younger protagonists. Sexuality is also depicted more openly, though these depictions in turn came to influence shōjo manga, which itself began to depict sexuality more openly in the 1990s. Several manga magazines blur distinctions between shōjo and josei, and publish works that aesthetically resemble shōjo manga but which deal with the adult themes of josei manga; examples include Kiss at Kodansha, Chorus and Cookie at Shueisha, and Betsucomi at Shogakukan.

==== Horror and erotica ====
Niche shōjo publications that eschewed typical shōjo manga conventions emerged in the 1980s, particularly in the horror and erotica genres. This occurred in the context of the decline of kashi-hon publishing, where publishers survived market shifts away from book rental by offering collected volumes of manga that had not been previously serialized in magazines. Hibari Shōbo and Rippū Shōbo were among the publishing companies that began to publish shōjo horror manga in this format, typically as volumes that contained a mix of kashi-hon reissues and original creations. Horror shōjo manga published by kashi-hon publishers was typically more gory and grotesque than the horror manga of mainstream shōjo magazines, in some case prompting accusations of obscenity and lawsuits by citizens' associations. These publishing houses folded by the end of the 1980s as they became replaced with mainstream shōjo manga magazines dedicated to the horror genre, beginning with Monthly Halloween in 1986.

In the 1990s, a genre of softcore pornographic shōjo manga emerged under the genre name teens' love. The genre shares many common traits with pornographic josei manga, with the distinguishing exception of the age of the protagonists, who are typically in their late teens and early twenties. Teens' love magazines proliferated at smaller publishers, such as Ohzora Publishing, which published a wide range of both josei and teens' love manga. The genre gradually migrated from small publishers to larger ones, such as Dessert and Shogakukan's mainstream shōjo magazines.

By the 2000s, this niche shōjo manga, particularly the teens' love genre, had largely abandoned printed formats in favor of the Internet, in response to the rise of mobile phones in Japan.

=== 2000s–present: Restructuring and influence of anime ===
==== Cross-media shōjo manga ====
In the 2000s, publishers who produced manga aimed at a female audience faced a changing market: josei manga had declined in popularity, girls increasingly preferred television dramas over printed of entertainment, and the manga market generally had slowed. Many major publishers restructured their shōjo manga magazine operations in response, folding certain magazines and launching new publications. The majority of the newly launched magazines during this period were commercial failures.

In 2008, the publishing house Fusosha, which had previously not published manga, entered the manga market with the shōjo manga magazine Malika. The magazine was unconventional compared to other shōjo manga magazines of the era: in addition to publishing manga by renowned female authors, it featured contributions from celebrities in media, illustration, and design; the magazine also operated a website that published music and additional stories. The magazine was a commercial failure and folded after six issues, but came to be emblematic of a new trend in shōjo manga: cross-media marketing, where works are published across multiple mediums simultaneously.

Early shōjo manga successes in this cross-media approach include Nana (2000–2009) by Ai Yazawa, Lovely Complex (2001–2006) by Aya Nakahara, and Nodame Cantabile (2001–2010) by Tomoko Ninomiya, all of which were alternately adapted into films, television dramas, anime series, video games, and series-branded music CDs. Older manga series, such as Attack No. 1 and Boys Over Flowers, found renewed success after being relaunched with cross-media adaptations.

==== Moe in shōjo manga ====
The shōjo magazines Asuka and Princess, which distinguished themselves by publishing a diversity of narrative genres such as fantasy and science fiction, saw new competitors emerge in the 2000s: Monthly Comic Zero Sum in 2002, Sylph in 2006, Comic Blade Avarus in 2007, and Aria in 2010. These new magazines explicitly targeted an audience of anime and boys' love (male-male romance) fans by publishing manga that closely resembled the visual style of anime, featured bishōnen protagonists in fantastical environments, and which deliberately played with the visual and narrative conventions of shōjo manga. In sum, the magazines represented the integration of moe in shōjo manga: a term describing an expression of cuteness focused on feelings of affection and excitement that is distinct from kawaii, the more child-like and innocent expression of cuteness typically associated with shōjo manga.

Moe was additionally expressed in shōjo manga through the emergence of so-called "boys shōjo manga", beginning with the magazines Comic High! in 2004 and Comic Yell! in 2007. Magazines in this category publish manga aimed at a male readership, but which use a visual style that draws significantly from the aesthetics of moe and shōjo manga.

==== In the English-speaking world ====
English-language translations of shōjo manga were first published in North America in the late 1990s. As the American comic book market was largely oriented towards male readers at the time, shōjo manga found early success by targeting a then-unreached audience of female comic book readers; English translations of titles such as Sailor Moon, Boys Over Flowers, and Fruits Basket became best-selling books. The English manga market crashed in the late 2000s due to the 2008 financial crisis, and when the medium regained popularity in the 2010s, shōnen manga emerged as the most popular category of manga among English-language readers. Nevertheless, every major English-language manga publisher maintains a robust line of shōjo manga; Viz Media in particular publishes shōjo manga under its Shojo Beat imprint, which it also published as a serialized manga magazine in the mid- to late-2000s.

== Style ==
=== Context and general elements ===
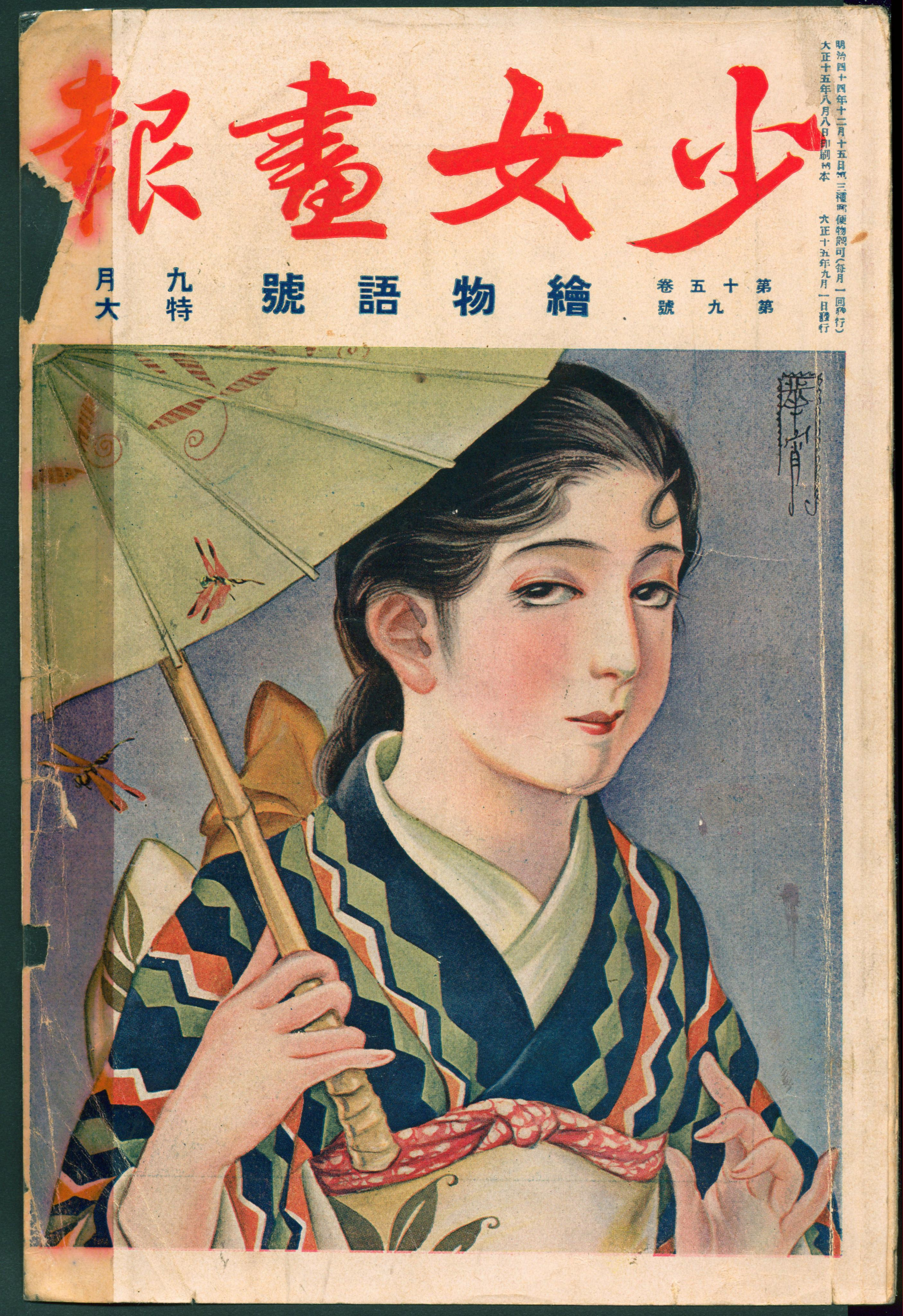
Cover of the September 1926 issue of Shōjo Gahō, with art by the lyrical painter Kashō Takabatake

The visual style of shōjo manga was largely similar to that of shōnen manga until the late 1950s, a function of the fact that both shōjo and shōnen manga were created by the same, mostly male, artists. During the pre-war period, these artists were especially influenced by the modernist style of George McManus, while in the post-war period the dynamic style of Osamu Tezuka became the primary reference point for manga. While shōjo manga inherited some of these influences, the unique style that emerged at the end of the 1950s which came to distinguish shōjo manga from shōnen manga was primarily derived from pre-war shōjo shōsetsu.

Shōjo shōsetsu is characterized by a "flowery and emotional" prose style focused on the inner monologue of the protagonist. Narration is often punctuated with non-verbal elements that express the feelings of the protagonists; writer Nobuko Yoshiya in particular made extensive use of multiple ellipsis ("..."), exclamation points, and dashes in the middle of sentences, the lattermost of which were scattered across pages in a manner resembling verses of poetry. Prose is accompanied by illustrations by lyrical painters, which are characterized by a sentimental style influenced by Art Nouveau and Nihonga. Particular attention is paid to representations of shōjo, who are depicted as well-dressed and possessing large, very detailed eyes that have star-shaped highlights.

This narrative and visual style began to influence shōjo manga towards the end of the 1950s; Macoto Takahashi, a lyrical painter and manga artist, is regarded as the first artist to use this style in manga. The style was quickly adopted by his contemporaries and later by shōjo artists who emerged in the 1960s, while in the 1970s artists associated with the Year 24 Group developed the style significantly. According to manga artist, academic, and Year 24 Group member Keiko Takemiya, shōjo manga was able to develop this distinct style because the category was seen as marginal by editors, who consequently allowed artists to draw stories in whatever manner they wished so long as reader response remained positive. Stylistic elements that were developed by the Year 24 Group became established as visual hallmarks of shōjo manga; many of these elements later spread to shōnen manga, such as the use of non-rigid panel layouts and highly detailed eyes that express the emotions of characters.

=== Layout ===
Beginning in the 1970s, panel layouts in shōjo manga developed a new and distinct style. In his 1997 book Why Is Manga So Interesting? Its Grammar and Expression, manga artist and critic Fusanosuke Natsume identifies and names the three major aspects of panel construction that came to distinguish shōjo manga from shōnen manga. The first, naiho ("panel encapsulations"), refers to the use of layouts that break from the traditional comic approach of a series of sequential boxes. In this style, elements extend beyond the borders of panels, or the panel border is removed entirely. Intervals between panels are also were modified, with sequential panels that depicted the same event from different angles or perspectives. Second is kaiho ("release"), referring to the use of decompression to create more languid and relaxed sequences. Oftentimes in compositions without panel borders, text is removed from speech balloons and spread across the page, especially in instances where the dialogue communicates the thoughts, feelings, and internal monologue of the speaker. Third is mahaku ("break"), referring to the symbolic use of white space.

=== Large eyes ===
A defining stylistic element of shōjo manga is its depiction of characters with very large, detailed eyes that have star-shaped highlights, sometimes referred to as dekame (デカ目). This technique did not originate in shōjo manga; large eyes have been drawn in manga since the early 20th century, notably by Osamu Tezuka, who drew inspiration from the theatrical makeup of actresses in the Takarazuka Revue when drawing eyes. A large central star that replaces the pupil dot began to appear at key moments in shōjo manga by Tezuka and Shotaro Ishinomori in the mid-1950s, though these details generally trended towards a realist style rather than the emotive style of later shōjo manga.

Contemporaneously, the art of Jun'ichi Nakahara was significantly influencing kashi-hon manga artists, especially Macoto Takahashi. Takahashi incorporated Nakahara's style of drawing eyes into his own manga – large, doll-like eyes with highlights and long lashes – while gradually introducing his own stylistic elements, such as the use of dots, stars, and multiple colors to represent the iris. At the end of the 1950s, Takahashi's style was adopted by Miyako Maki – one of the most popular manga artists at the time – which led to its widespread adoption by mainstream shōjo manga magazines.

From this point on, experimental eye design flourished in shōjo manga, with features such as elongated eyelashes, the use of concentric circles of different shades, and the deformation of the iris to create a glittering effect. This focus on hyper-detailed eyes led manga artists to frame panels on close-ups of faces, to draw attention to the emotions being expressed by the eyes of the characters. Eyes also came to serve as a marker of gender, with female characters typically having larger eyes than male characters.

== Themes ==
=== Interpersonal relationships ===
Among the most common concepts in shōjo manga is that of ningen kankei (人間関係; "human relationships"), which refers to interpersonal relationships between characters and the interaction of their emotions. Relationships between characters are central to most shōjo manga, particularly those of friendship, affection, and love. Narratives often focus on the interiority of their protagonists, wherein their emotions, feelings, memories, and inner monologue are expressed visually through techniques such as panel arrangement and the rendering of eye details. When conflict occurs, the most common medium of exchange is dialogue and conversation, as opposed to physical combat typical in shōnen manga.

Manga scholar Yukari Fujimoto considers that the content of shōjo manga has evolved in tandem with the evolution of Japanese society, especially in terms of the place of women, the role of the family, and romantic relationships. She notes how family dramas with a focus on mother-daughter relationships were popular in the 1960s, while stories about romantic relationships became more popular in the 1970s, and stories about father figures became popular in the 1990s. As shōjo manga began to focus on adolescents over children beginning in the 1970s, romantic relationships generally become more important than family relationships; these romantic relationships are most often heterosexual, though they are occasionally homosexual.

=== Gender and sexuality ===
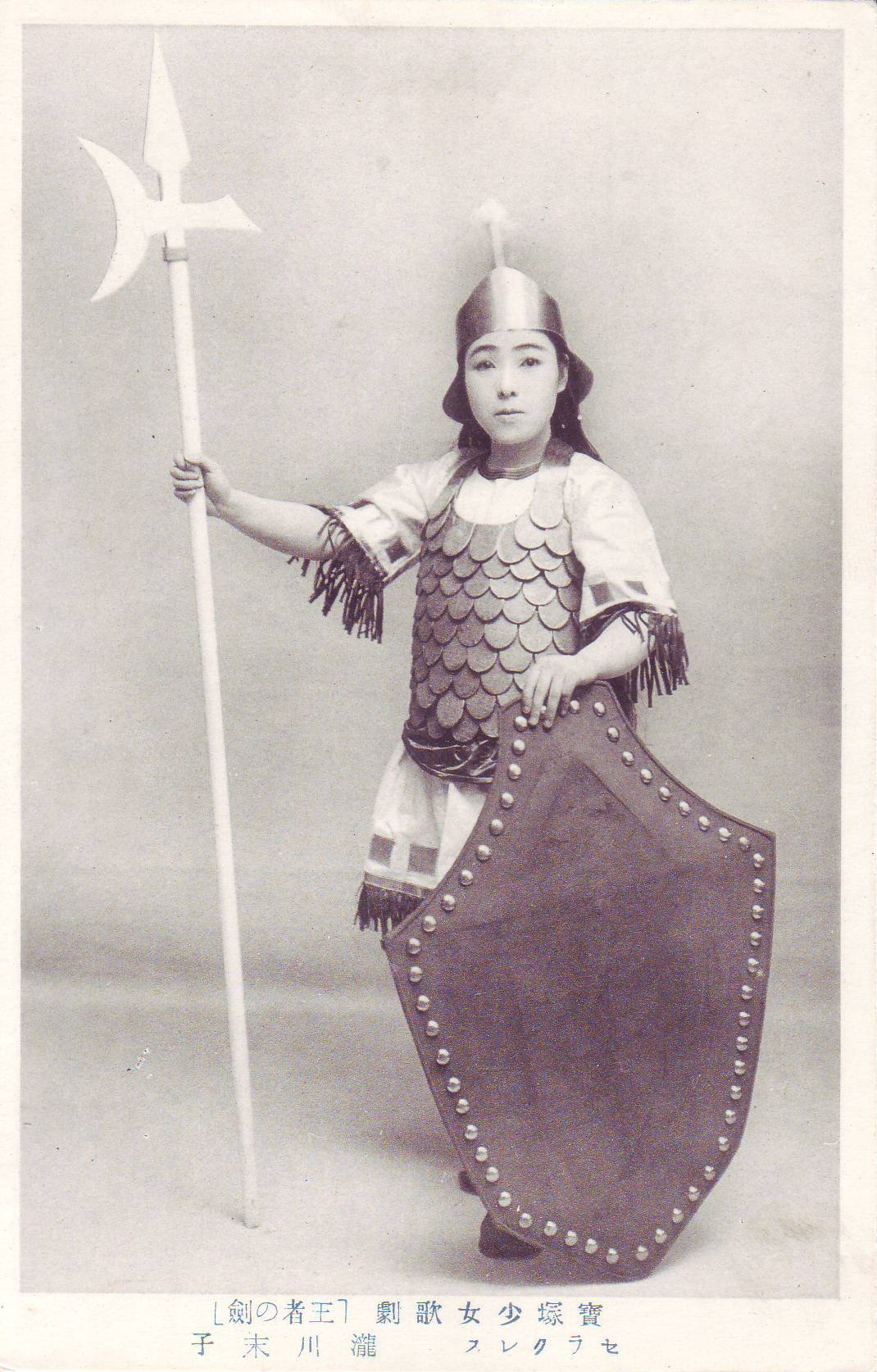
Shōjo war fiction emerged in tandem with the militarization of Japan in the 1930s, while an emphasis on cross-dressing came from the popularity of the cross-dressing actresses of the Takarazuka Revue (actress Sueko Takigawa pictured).

Characters that defy traditional roles and stereotypes surrounding gender and sexuality have been a central motif of shōjo manga since its origins. Tomboy protagonists, referred to as otenba (お転婆), appear regularly in pre-war shōjo manga. This archetype has two primary variants: the "fighting girl" (as in Katsuji Matsumoto's Nazo no Kurōbaa, in which a girl takes up arms to defend the peasants of her village), and the "crossdressing girl" (as in Eisuke Ishida's Kanaria Ōjisama, in which a princess is raised as a prince). Osamu Tezuka's Princess Knight represents the synthesis of these two archetypes, wherein a princess who is raised as a prince comes to face her enemies in combat. These archetypes were generally popular in shōjo war fiction, which emerged in tandem with the militarization of Japan in the 1930s, while an emphasis on cross-dressing arose from the popularity of the cross-dressing actresses of the Takarazuka Revue. Otenba grew in popularity in the post-war period, which critic Yoshihiro Yonezawa attributes to advancements in gender equality marked by the enshrinement of the equality of the sexes in the Constitution of Japan in 1947.

By the end of the 1960s, sexuality – both heterosexual and homosexual – began to be freely depicted in shōjo manga. This shift was brought about in part by literalist interpretations of manga censorship codes: for example, the first sex scenes in shōjo manga were including by covering characters having sex with bed sheets to circumvent codes that specifically only forbade depictions of genitals and pubic hair. The evolution of these representations of gender in sexuality occurred in tandem with the feminization of shōjo manga's authorship and readership, as the category shifted from being created primarily by men for an audience of young girls, to being created by women for an audience of teenaged and young adult women; since the 1970s, shōjo manga has been written almost exclusively by women.

=== Homosexuality ===
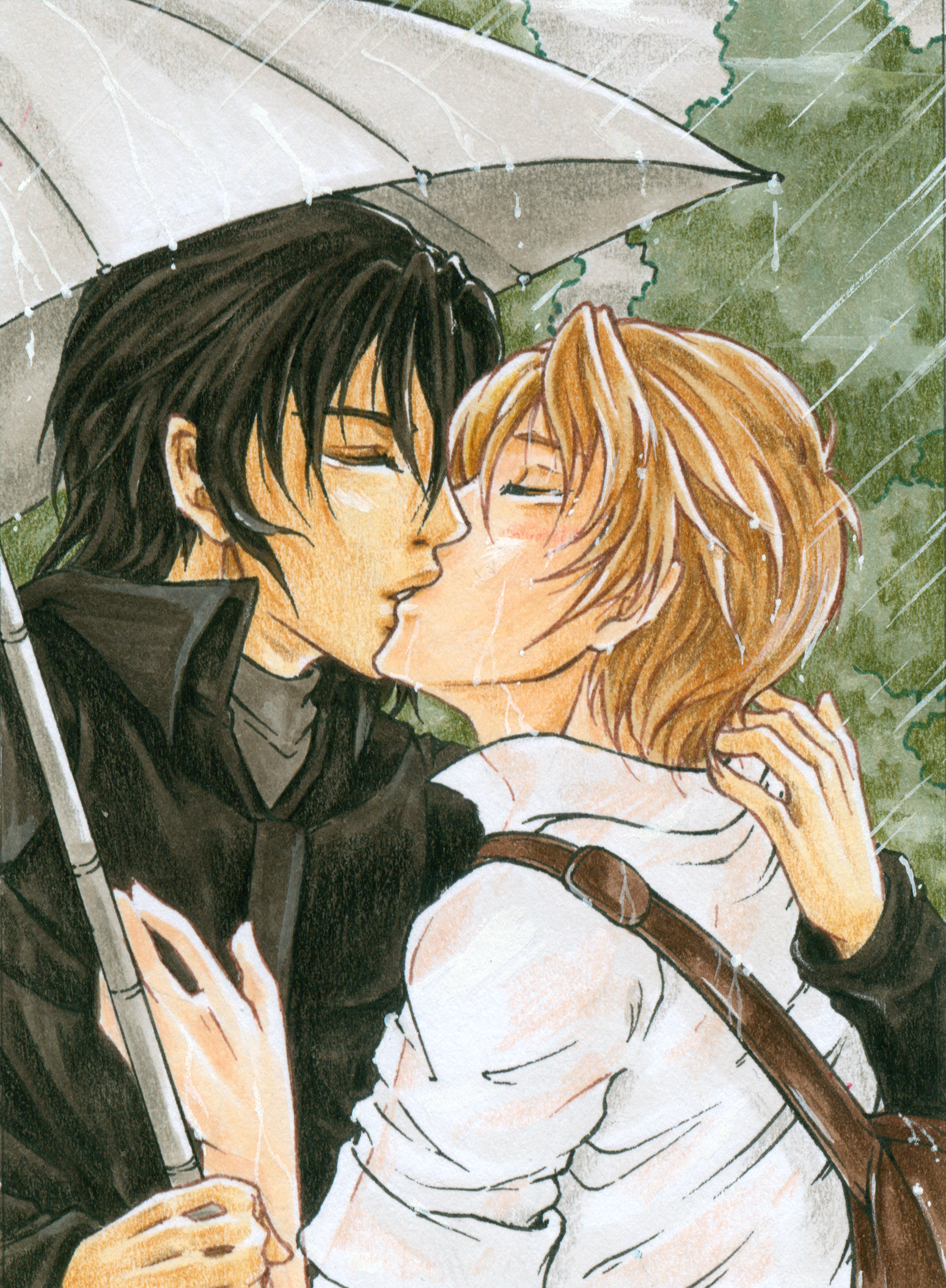
Male-male romance manga, referred to as yaoi or "boys' love" (BL), is a significant subgenre of shōjo manga.

Though they compose a minority of shōjo stories overall, male–male romance manga – referred to as yaoi or "boys' love" (BL) – is a significant subgenre of shōjo manga. Works in the genre typically focus on androgynous men referred to as bishōnen (literally "beautiful boys"), with a focus on romantic fantasy rather than a strictly realist depiction of gay relationships. Yaoi emerged as a formal subgenre of shōjo manga in the 1970s, but its portrayals of gay male relationships used and further developed bisexual themes already extant in shōjo manga. Japanese critics have viewed yaoi as a genre that permits its audience to avoid adult female sexuality by distancing sex from their own bodies, as well as creating fluidity in perceptions of gender and sexuality by rejecting socially mandated gender roles. Parallels have also been drawn between yaoi and the popularity of lesbianism in pornography, with the genre having been called a form of "female fetishism".

Female–female romance manga, also known as yuri, has been historically and thematically linked to shōjo manga since its emergence in the 1970s, though yuri is not strictly exclusive to shōjo and has been published across manga demographic groups. A relationship between shōjo culture and female–female romance dates to the pre-war period with stories in the Class S genre, which focused on intense romantic friendships between girls. By the post-war period, these works had largely declined in popularity in favor of works focused on male–female romances. Yukari Fujimoto posits that as the readership of shōjo manga is primarily female and heterosexual, female homosexuality is rarely addressed. Fujimoto sees the largely tragic bent of most yuri stories, with a focus on doomed relationships that end in separation or death, as representing a fear of female sexuality on the part of female readers, which she sees as also explaining the interest of shōjo readers on yaoi manga.

=== Paranormality ===
Shōjo manga often features supernatural and horror elements, such as stories focused on yūrei (ghosts), oni (demons), and yōkai (spirits), or which are otherwise structured around Japanese urban legends or Japanese folklore. These works are female-focused, where both the human characters and supernatural beings are typically women or bishōnen. Paranormal shōjo manga gained and maintained popularity by depicting scenarios that allow female readers to freely explore feelings of jealousy, anger, and frustration, which are typically not depicted in mainstream shōjo manga focused on cute characters and melodramatic scenarios.

Mother-daughter conflict, as well as the fear or rejection of motherhood, appear as major motif in paranormal shōjo manga; for example, stories where mothers take on the appearance of demons or ghosts, daughters of demons who are themselves transformed into demons, impious pregnancies resulting from incestuous rape, and mothers who commit filicide out of jealousy or insanity. The social pressure and oppression borne from a patriarchal Japanese society also recurs as a motif, such as a curse or vengeful ghost that originates from a murdered woman or a victim of harassment. In these stories, the curse is typically resolved by showing compassion for the ghost, rather than trying to destroy it. Stories about Japanese urban legends were particularly popular in the 1970s, and typically focus on stories that were popular among Japanese teenaged girls, such as Kuchisake-onna, Hanako-san, and Teke Teke.

=== Fashion ===
The relationship between shōjo culture and fashion dates to pre-war shōjo magazines, where artists such as Jun'ichi Nakahara illustrated fashion catalogs that included written instructions on how readers could make the depicted garments themselves. As manga grew in popularity in the post-war period, shōjo magazines continued their focus on fashion by publishing works featuring characters in elaborate outfits, or through promotional campaigns that offered clothes worn by manga characters as prizes. Notable manga artists associated with this trend include Macoto Takahashi, Masako Watanabe, and Miyako Maki, the lattermost of whom had their designs serve as the foundation for the popular Licca-chan doll in 1967.

By the 1970s, consumer trends shifted from making clothes to shopping for them; shōjo manga followed this trend with the appearance of stories centered on the careers of clothing designers. Manga in the otomechikku subgenre of shōjo manga emphasized kawaii fashion inspired by Ivy League style; the otomechikku aesthetic was later adopted by women's fashion magazines such as An An and Olive. Some women's fashion magazines began to publish their own shōjo manga in the 1980s, such as CUTiE (which published Tokyo Girls Bravo by Kyōko Okazaki and Jelly Beans by Moyoco Anno) and Zipper (which published Paradise Kiss by Ai Yazawa and Teke Teke Rendezvous by George Asakura). Cosplay began to influence shōjo manga in the 1990s, leading to the development of titles like Sailor Moon that directly appealed to an otaku readership. This led to a split in shōjo representations of fashion between works that depicted realistic everyday fashions, and those that depicted fantastical outfits that could be cosplayed. The fashion world itself began to take an interest in shōjo manga in the 2000s, with fashion shows showcasing pieces influenced by shōjo manga or which were drawn from costumes in popular shōjo franchises such as Sailor Moon.

Generally, the clothing worn by characters in shōjo manga reflect the fashion trends of the era in which the series was produced. Nevertheless, some common traits recur across eras: clothing adorned with ribbons or frills, and outfits that are especially feminine and child-like. Cute and ostentatious outfits are generally more common than outfits which are sexualized or modest. Major inspirations include Victorian fashion for girls – as embodied by Alice from Alice's Adventures in Wonderland, who is often invoked by Japanese manga, magazines and brands – and ballet costumes, especially tutus.

== Culture ==
=== Marketing and reader feedback ===
Manga in Japan is serialized in manga magazines before being published as books and collected volumes. To encourage repeat readership, magazines seek to foster a sense of community with their readership; this is especially true of magazines aimed at an audience of younger reader aged ten or younger, sometimes referred to as imōto (妹; "little sister"). Magazines seek to appeal to this young readership by publishing content related to anime, video games, and toys in addition to manga. Supplemental materials, typically low-cost novelty items such as stickers, posters, and pens decorated with manga characters, are also used to attract readers, with the items placed in plastic bags that are attached to the magazines themselves. Larger novelty items are occasionally offered by mail order in exchange for coupons that readers can clip out of the magazine.

In the case of both imōto and magazines aimed at older readers, referred to as onēsan (お姉さん; "big sister"), readers are invited to submit their opinions on current manga serials through letters and polls. Often, a random survey respondent will receive a prize. Publishers use insights collected from these polls to change plotlines, highlight a secondary character, or end a series that is unpopular. These polls are also used when determining which manga to adapt into derivative works, such as anime and video games.

In addition to survey responses, letters from readers are used as a means to gauge audience opinion and develop a sense of community. These letters are sent to publishers, but addressed directly at the authors themselves. The content of these letters ranges from questions for the author, anecdotes from their daily lives, and drawings; some letters are published in the magazines themselves. Meetings between readers and authors also occur regularly. These may be organized by the publisher, who select a group of readers to bring to their offices on a prize trip, or as a field trip organized by schools. In both cases, these visits strengthen the bond between reader and publisher, while also providing the publisher with insights into their readership.

=== Talent development ===
Manga publishers often discover new authors through their readership, who are actively encouraged to submit stories and receive feedback from the magazine's editors. This system of talent discovery and development is not unique to shōjo manga, though the practice originates in pre-war girls' magazines, where female readers were invited to submit novels and short stories. Imōto magazines develop this system from a young age with the aim of having adult artists one day publish manga in the magazines they read when they were children, while onēsan magazines typically have readers and artists who are of a similar age. By developing a system the authors of manga in a magazine were formerly readers, the distance between the two is reduced and a sense of community is fostered.

== See also ==
- British girls' comics
- Magical girl, Japanese fantasy subgenre
- Romance comics
