= Shōjo no tomo =

Japanese manga magazine

Shōjo no tomo (少女の友, Shōjo no tomo; "Girls' Friend") was a Japanese magazine published by Jitsugyo no Nihon Sha from February 1908 to June 1955. It featured early shōjo manga-style imagery, and work by Takuboku Ishikawa, Katsuji Matsumoto, Jun'ichi Nakahara, and Akiko Yosano.

== See also ==
- Shōjo gahō
