= Class S (culture) =

Japanese social practice and literary genre

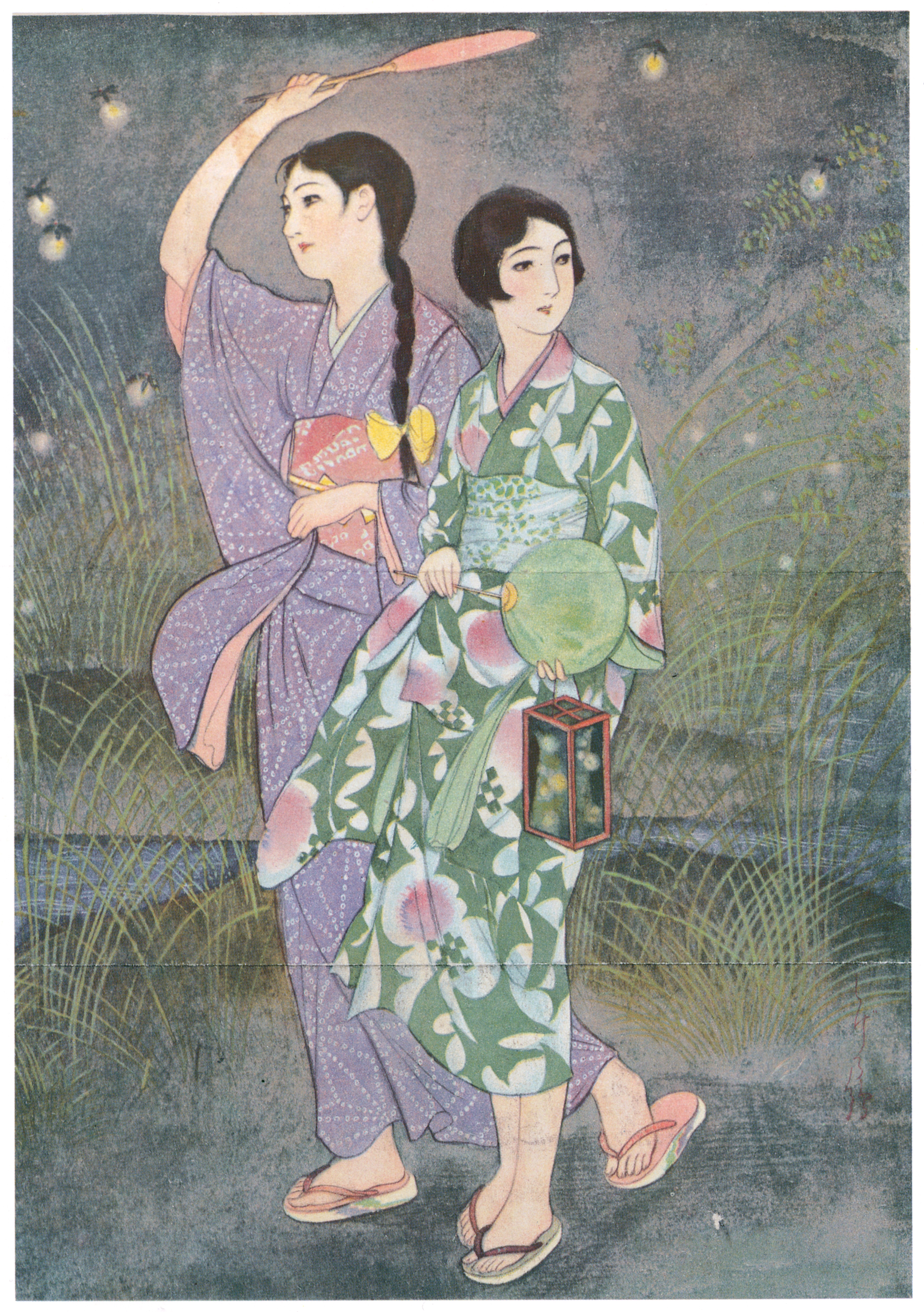
Hotaru Kari (ほたる狩り; "Firefly Hunting"), illustration by Shigeru Sudō, 1926

Class S (Japanese: クラスS, Hepburn: kurasu esu), also known as esu kankei (エス関係; lit. "S relationship") and abbreviated as S or esu (エス) (Note: Contemporary Japanese sources and historical slang dictionaries, such as the 1925 Atarashii Kotoba no Jibiki, record "S" strictly as an abbreviation for "sister" (specifically reflecting a sisterly, non-biological sibling bond). While some modern Western gender studies scholars have retrospectively suggested that "S" could additionally stand for shōjo ('girl') or "sex", such sexualized meanings contradict the historically defined non-physical, spiritual purity essential to the phenomenon's social acceptance.) is a social practice that emerged in early 20th-century Japan, most commonly expressed as a strong bond or romantic friendship between schoolgirls or between female students and their female teachers. It is also used to refer to the literary genre depicting such relationships. The term "S" is a piece of slang derived from the first letter of the English word "sister".

== Etymology ==
The slang term "S" (or "esu") initially referred to an intense, passionate relationship between girls who were not biologically related, or between a student and a female teacher. It began to appear in the 1910s, eventually gaining widespread popularity and eclipsing other contemporary schoolgirl slang terms for romantic partnerships, such as ome (お目) or odeya (おでや).

Before the medicalized, Western-influenced term dōseiai (同性愛; "same-sex love") gained prominence, schoolgirls used regional slang to describe these relationships; ome (お目) was highly popular in elite Tokyo girls' schools, while odeya (おでや) was used in other regions.

== History ==
The genre of "S" literature was pioneered by Nobuko Yoshiya, an openly lesbian writer whose works strongly reflected her own romantic inclinations. Her anthology Hana Monogatari (Flower Tales), serialized in the magazine Shōjo Gahō (Girls' Illustrated), became highly popular and sparked a boom in works depicting Class S relationships. Similar stories flooded other publications, such as Shōjo no Tomo (Girls' Companion), reaching a peak in the 1930s. Notable examples that realistically portrayed girls' school culture include Yoshiya's Wasurenagusa (Forget-Me-Not) and Machi no Kodachi (Grove of the Town), as well as Otome no minato (The Maidens' Harbor) by Yasunari Kawabata (ghostwritten by Tsuneko Nakazato).

This literary boom was preceded by a growing awareness of Western sexology. In April 1914, Raichō Hiratsuka published a translation of Havelock Ellis's study on female sexual inversion in the feminist journal Seitō. This climate directly influenced alternative literary projects, such as the short-lived coterie journal Safuran (番紅花, 1914), founded by former Seitō member Kazue Otake (Beni-yoshi). Unlike the highly idealized, flower-themed Shōjo novels of the Shōwa era, Safuran featured raw, autobiographical works—such as Hatsuno Sugawara's novella Dōyō (動揺, "Oscillation")—that realistically depicted the intense, sometimes painful self-awareness of girls navigating romantic attachments under the looming threat of being pathologized as "abnormal" by society.

The rising popularity of this literature coincided with the expansion of girls' secondary education, which led to an increase in the number of female students and graduates. Class S literature gave a distinct form to girls' culture, acting as a medium that romanticized and elevated ordinary, everyday friendships into special, idealized bonds. In these novels and in reader submissions, these relationships were explicitly described using terms like "love" (ai (愛) or aijō (愛情)). Rather than being a closeted physical relationship artificially suppressed by state censorship—though the book department of the Ministry of Home Affairs did actively monitor publications for depictions of homosexuality—the non-physical, spiritual nature of Class S was a core, defining feature of the relationship itself. By emphasizing extreme spiritual purity (seijunsa (清純さ)), participants and authors constructed a boundary that separated Class S from pathologized, physical same-sex love, thereby securing its legitimacy in the eyes of educators.

Aside from "S", girls' schools also developed other slang terms with similar meanings, such as "stroke" and "cross game". Girls' magazines were inundated with reader submissions describing intense Class S attachments to classmates, female teachers, and female athletes—sometimes to the point of exhausting the magazine editors. This indicates that Class S was a widespread and ordinary aspect of schoolgirl culture. For instance, a letter from a reader published in the September 1928 issue of Shōjo Gahō highlights the intensity of these feelings:

[Question] Teacher, please save a miserable girl like me. I am a third-year schoolgirl, crying in agony. I sit in the fifth seat of my classroom, and in the fourth seat sits the one I adore, M-sama. M-sama! M-sama! My heart goes wild just calling out her name. Yet, the M-sama of my dreams is completely unaware of my painful longing, only captivating my heart with her angelic smile and the cute dimples on her pale cheeks... Oh God, if you exist, please let me talk with her closely, even if only for an hour.

Although double suicides between women had been reported in newspapers since the late 19th century, a high-profile double suicide of two girls' school graduates in Niigata in July 1911 served as a major catalyst for public anxiety, bringing female "same-sex love" (dōseiai (同性愛)) into the spotlight of mainstream print media, such as the weekly newspaper Fujojo Shinbun (婦女新聞). Educators and media commentators began actively pathologizing these relationships, introducing Western sexological frameworks to police female sexuality. To regulate these bonds, school authorities and commentators constructed a rigid dichotomy:

- Pure, spiritual friendship (junzen taru yūai (純然たる友愛)): Extolled as beautiful, sisterly, and morally safe, provided it did not degenerate into "pathological friendship" (狂的・病的友愛). This was tolerated and gently guided (zendō (善導)) by educators as a temporary adolescent phase.
- Abnormal same-sex love (associated with the colloquial term ome): Pathologized as a "diseased" and physical inversion (tentō seiyoku (転倒性欲)). It was severely condemned, particularly when it involved physical intimacy, a partner adopting a "masculine" persona to dominate the other, or a refusal to eventually transition to heterosexual marriage.

Following World War II, the traditional girls' school system was reorganized into coeducational schools, and public interest shifted toward heterosexual romance. As depictions of heterosexual love became normalized in girls' magazines, the popularity of Class S waned.

== Characteristics ==
Class S relationships were idealized as exclusive, one-on-one relationships where both parties were expected to be unique and irreplaceable to one another, though in practice, interpersonal conflicts and betrayals occurred. The relationship emphasized mutual support, personal growth, and a requirement of spiritual purity (seijunsa (清純さ)). Driven by intense admiration, partners often exhibited a mirroring behavior, seeking deep identification or "oneness" with each other.

Typically, strict peer-enforced rules governed these pairings; for instance, a student was permitted only one Class S partner in the grade above her and one in the grade below. Violations of these unwritten boundaries could result in social exclusion or peer sanctions, although exact practices varied by region. The rituals of these early schoolgirl relationships were documented in contemporary publications. For example, an October 1910 issue of the magazine Murasaki describes the initiation of an ome relationship:

An older, upper-class student catches sight of an innocent, charming newly admitted lower-class girl. Finding her adorable, she consults with her "clique" (gorenjū), an intimate circle of four to six of her closest classmates, saying, "I find such-and-such newly entered student very lovely, and I would like to make her my ome—what do you think?" In their slang, ome is the term lovers use to call each other. If no one else in the clique already claims affection for the named girl, they agree to act as matchmakers. The initiating student, overjoyed, immediately hands a ribbon—either of "deep purple" or "burning passion red"—to her clique. The group then secretly calls the beloved girl, whispers the situation to her, and hands her the ribbon. If the girl remains silent, accepts the ribbon, and ties it into her glossy dark hair, it signifies that the proposal has been accepted. From then on, they call each other by the intimate slang name ome-san, and their mutual affection grows ever deeper.

If Class S relationships persisted after graduation, the women involved were often stigmatized as "old maids" (rōjō (老嬢)). For the schoolgirls themselves, these intimate relationships were distinct from ordinary friendships, and the arbitrary division between "temporary" and "true" homosexuality had little practical meaning. In an era before a strict binary of friendship versus homosexuality was firmly established, girls explored a variety of intimate relationships under the umbrella of "friendship".

== Analysis ==
Class S stood in stark contrast to the heterosexual expectations of the era, which demanded female chastity, maintained male-dominated power structures, and expected women to fully devote themselves to men as "Good Wife, Wise Mother" figures without reciprocity. Consequently, Class S functioned as a form of counterculture, allowing girls to resist patriarchal family expectations and arranged marriages through free and egalitarian romantic relationships. Rather than viewing Class S simply as a choice between a rebellious counterculture or a state-enforced domestic training ground, some sociological analyses resolve this paradox by framing the phenomenon as a complex social safety valve. According to historian Erika Imada, the rapid expansion of women's education stimulated intense academic and personal passions among schoolgirls. However, because professional careers and independent social mobility remained restricted for women, Class S functioned to safely divert these passions into a non-physical, artistic, and highly spiritualized domestic sphere. When girls graduated and transitioned to marriage, this system allowed their intense intellectual and romantic energies to be safely "cooled down" (leikyaku (冷却)) and channeled back into traditional household roles, preventing their personal aspirations from disrupting the established patriarchal order. While some scholars argue that Class S was largely an idealized literary concept, others point out that girls constructed active, real-world networks through magazines by exchanging letters, organizing reader conventions, and publishing fanzines together—forming lifelong friendships that sometimes persisted long after they married.

Some analyses suggest that Class S was driven by a desire for complete assimilation, blurring the lines between lover, friend, and family member. This intense focus on the traits of the admired partner could also turn inward, resulting in a narcissistic appreciation of one's own identity.

=== Legacy ===
Many classic Class S novels were later reprinted by young adult imprints. Similar dynamics of passionate, platonic intimacy between girls are widely observed in modern yuri media, which experienced a commercial boom beginning in the 2000s. Additionally, cultural analysts suggest that the emphasis on mirroring and identity expression in Class S survived in modern Japanese youth fashion trends, such as "twins coordination" (futago kōde (双子コーデ)), where close female friends dress in identical or highly coordinated outfits.

=== Analogous non-Japanese cultures ===
Similar romantic and non-marital female relationships have been documented globally, particularly in late 19th-century America. Intense, platonic "romantic friendships" peaked during this period, occasionally leading to independent households established by college-educated women. Numerous literary works from this era depicted such relationships under the guise of highly moral, non-sexual female bonds.

In adulthood, these domestic partnerships were often referred to as "Boston marriages," which were generally respected as an acceptable arrangement for unmarried women as long as they were assumed to remain platonic. While women in these arrangements did not face the severe legal and social persecution experienced by homosexual men of the same era, these romantic friendships were eventually pathologized and criticized by mainstream medical and social institutions by the early 20th century.

== See also ==
- Bromance
- Sorority
- Womance

== Bibliography ==
- 弥生美術館 (Yayoi Museum) & 内田静枝 (Uchida Shizue), eds. (2005). 女學生手帖 大正・昭和 乙女ライフ (Schoolgirl Notebook: Taisho and Showa Girl Life). 河出書房新社 (Kawade Shobō Shinsha). ISBN 978-4309727425. (Reissued in 2014, ISBN 978-4-309-75013-2).
