= Yumeji Takehisa =

Japanese artist

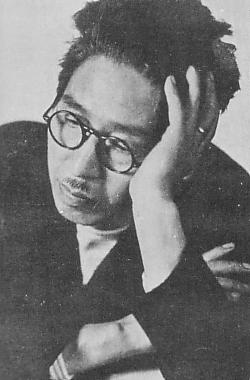
- Yumeji Takehisa during the Taishō era
- Born: Mojirō Takehisa; 16 September 1884; Oku, Okayama, Japan (Setouchi)
- Died: 1 September 1934 (aged 49); Ochiai, Nagano, Japan (Fujimi)
- Resting place: Zōshigaya Cemetery
- Known for: Painter, poet
- Movement: Nihonga
- Spouse: Tamaki Kishi (m. 1907; div. 1909)
- Children: 3

Yumeji Takehisa (Japanese: 竹久 夢二, Hepburn: Takehisa Yumeji; born Mojirō Takehisa (竹久 茂次郎, Takehisa Mojirō), 16 September 1884 – 1 September 1934) was a Japanese poet and painter. He is known foremost for his Nihonga illustrations of bijin, beautiful women and girls, though he also produced a wide variety of works including book covers, serial newspaper illustrations, furoshiki, postcards, and patterned washi paper.

== Biography ==
=== Early life ===
Takehisa was born in the village of Honjō, near Okayama. His childhood home has been preserved and opened to visitors. After struggling to make ends meet doing odd jobs in Tokyo, he eventually enrolled at Waseda Jitsugyō High School, a college-preparatory school for Waseda University in September 1902.

Takehisa's career doing illustrations began in June 1905 after he won a competition by the magazine Chugakusekai, owned by Hakubunkan, one of Japan's leading publishing companies. It was at this time that he adopted the name Yumeji. After he won the competition he began contributing regularly to Hakubunkan. His struggles living in Tokyo endeared him to socialist causes, and some of his earliest work was featured in the socialist and anti-war Heimin Shinbun journal Chokugen. After the High Treason Incident, a socialist-anarchist plot to assassinate Emperor Meiji in 1910, many of the people he worked with at the Heimin Shinbun were arrested and executed. Takehisa was arrested and questioned for two days but was released. He abandoned his direct support for socialist movements, but he maintained strong sense of sympathy to the struggles of the lower class throughout his life.

Takehisa married Tamaki Kishi, a subject of many of his paintings and the manager of a Tokyo postcard shop, in 1907. Kishi's postcard shop served as an outlet for Takehisa's work. They had three sons together, but they divorced in 1909 after a difficult marriage. After their divorce, the two opened a store in 1914 that sold various goods featuring Takehisa's designs. Takehisa met his next lover, Hikono Kasai, shortly after the opening of the store. Takehisa left Tokyo for Kyoto in 1916, followed by Kasai the next year. They returned to Tokyo in November 1918. Kasai became ill in 1919 and died in 1920, but Takehisa met another model, Oyo, before Kasai died.

=== Later life ===
The 1923 Great Kantō earthquake was a pivotal event in Takehisa's career. He documented the devastation of the disaster in a series of illustrations; however, the earthquake ruined his business, and it was a setback he did not recover from for several years.

Takehisa and Oyo moved in together to a residence outside of Tokyo in 1924; however, Oyo broke off their relationship the next year. Takehisa left Japan to travel to the United States on 7 May 1931 during the decline of the Taisho Democracy and the rise of the militarist government. His intention in the United States and later Europe was to gain a larger understanding of Western art trends in order to create an art institute in Japan, a goal he never achieved. He traveled throughout Europe in 1933. In Berlin he lectured twice a week at the art school of Johannes Itten, a Swiss expressionist associated with Bauhaus.

Takehisa taught Japanese Painting in Germany from February to June 1933. Troubled by the rise of Nazism, which reminded him of the Japanese militarists, Takehisa returned to Japan later in 1933. He died in the early morning of 1 September 1934 at the age of 49, several months after being urgently admitted to a sanatorium in Nagano Prefecture. He is buried in Zōshigaya Cemetery in the Ikebukuro area of Tokyo.

== Significance, style, and themes ==
At an early stage in Takehisa's life his intention was to become a poet. A 1918 poem of his titled "Yoimachigusa" gained appeal throughout Japan. By then he had already ventured into the visual arts that he would become well known for, beginning with illustrations that were published in magazines in 1905. His first exhibition of Nihonga paintings was displayed at the Kyoto City Library in 1912.

Takehisa's depictions of female characters with large eyes had a significant influence on the incipient shōjo manga genre, evident in the work of influential manga artists such as The Rose of Versailles creator Riyoko Ikeda. He also heavily influenced Koshiro Onchi, the father of the sōsaku-hanga movement.

During his time lecturing at the Bauhaus art school, Takehisa took on 10 students for a Japanese painting course, for which he wrote The Concept of Japanese Painting, a handwritten guide to the various styles of ink wash painting that was translated into German. The guide expressed the importance of lines in Japanese art rather than planes and the philosophy that lines are representative of the linear nature of inner thought.

== Gallery ==
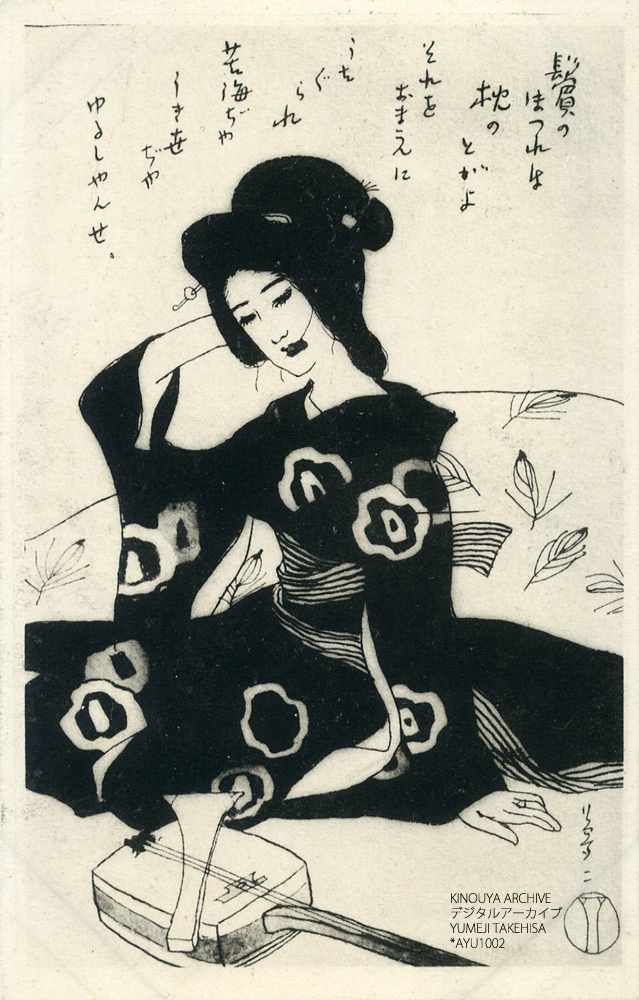
Postcard by Takehisa Yumeji, 1912

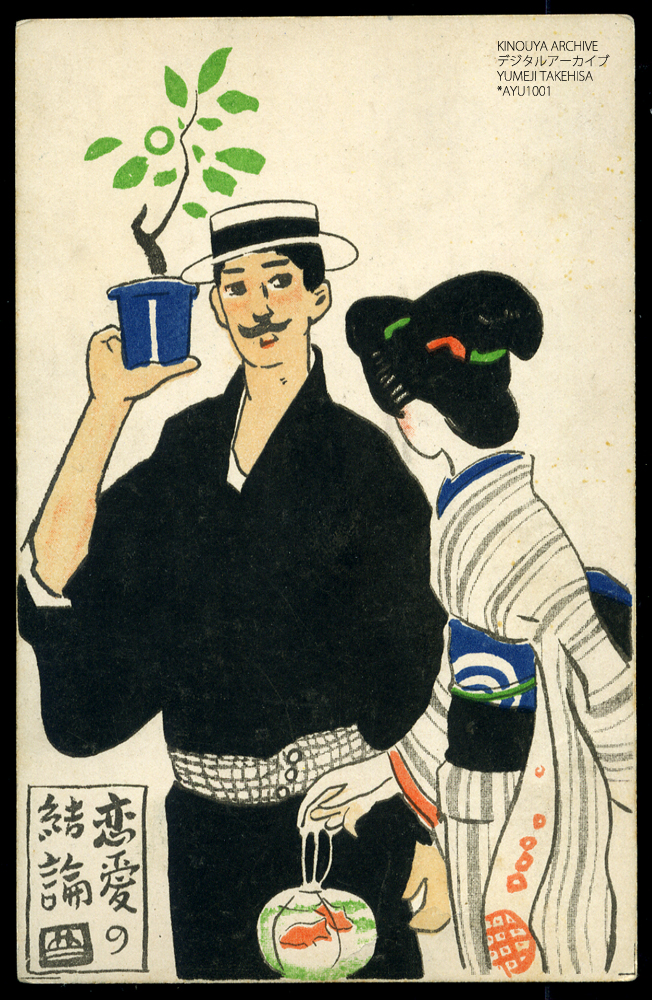
Postcard by Takehisa Yumeji, 1910

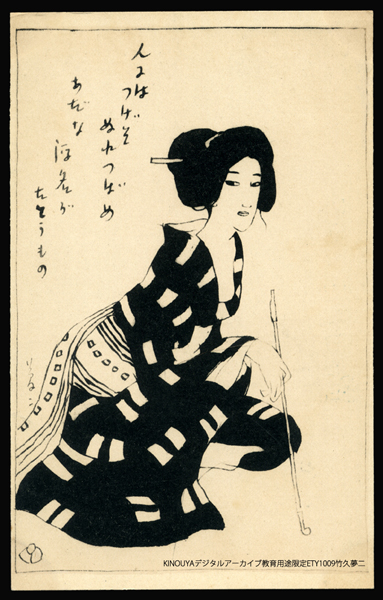
Postcard by Takehisa Yumeji, 1913

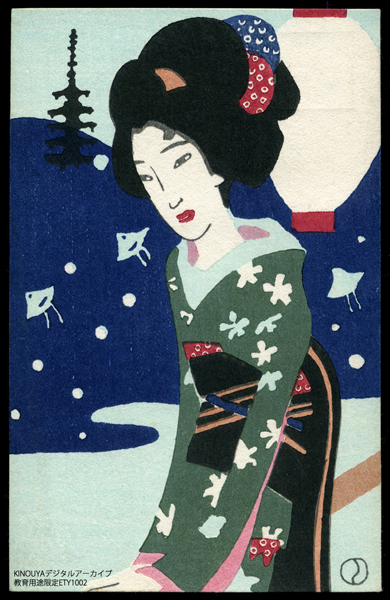
Postcard by Takehisa Yumeji, 1930s

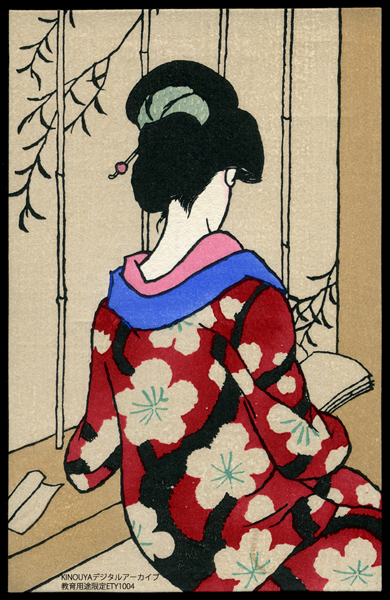
Postcard by Takehisa Yumeji, 1930s

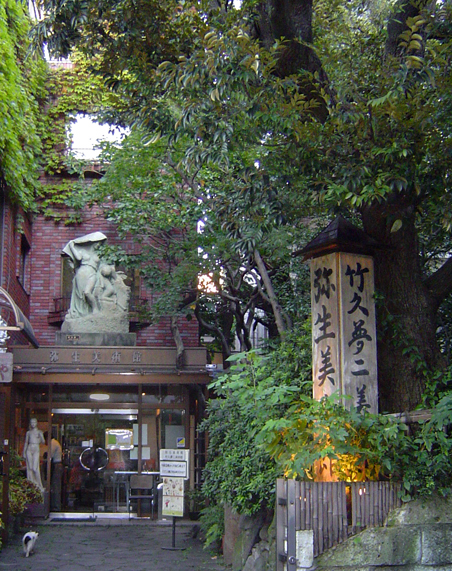
Yayoi-Takehisa Yumeji Bijutsukan, Tokyo

== Legacy ==
Seijun Suzuki's film Yumeji (1991), which forms the final part of his independently produced Taishō trilogy, is loosely based on the life of Takehisa.

== See also ==
- List of Nihonga painters
- Katsuji Matsumoto
- Jun'ichi Nakahara
- Yumeji Art Museum
