= Katsuji Matsumoto =

Illustrator, manga artist (1904–1986)

- Katsuji Matsumoto in an undated photograph
- Born: July 25, 1904 Kobe, Hyōgo Prefecture, Japan
- Died: May 13, 1986 (aged 81) Izu, Shizuoka, Japan
- Areas: Illustrator, comics creator, designer
- Notable works: Kurukuru Kurumi-chan; The Mysterious Clover

Katsuji Matsumoto (松本かつぢ, Matsumoto Katsuji; 1904–1986) was a Japanese illustrator and shōjo manga artist. (Note: Although he generally wrote his given name in hiragana, かつぢ, his legal given name, pronounced the same, was written in kanji, 勝治.) (Note: The Matsumoto Katsuji 松本勝治 of this article should not be confused with animation director Matsumoto Katsuji 松本 勝次 who has worked on the Sailor Moon anime (note difference in the fourth kanji).) Matsumoto's 16-page The Mysterious Clover (1934) is recognized as a pioneering work in the field of manga, but he is best known for his shōjo manga Kurukuru Kurumi-chan, serialized from 1938 to 1940, and again from 1949 to 1954.

His illustrations were popular from the 1930s through the 1950s, and he contributed illustrations to numerous popular girls' novels by some of the period's most famous authors, including Yasunari Kawabata and Nobuko Yoshiya. He was also a prolific illustrator of children's books and created merchandise for babies, small children, and girls. The Gallery Katsuji Matsumoto in Tokyo is managed by his surviving children.

== Early life and professional debut ==
Matsumoto was born in Kobe, the son of Toraji (寅治) and Ishi (いし) Matsumoto, but moved with his family to Tokyo at the age of eight. At the age of 13, he began attending what was then called Rikkyō (St. Paul's) Middle School. (Note: The school is today known as Rikkyō (St. Paul's) Junior & Senior High School in Ikebukuro. In the prewar period, chūgakkō (中学校, "middle school") referred to what would today be considered an academically elite high school or "prep school.") Through the introduction of a teacher at Rikkyō, Matsumoto began drawing illustrations for the magazine Shinseinen (新青年, "New Youth") at the age of 17. Matsumoto withdrew from Rikkyō at the age of 18 and began attending the Kawabata ga gakkō (川端画学校, "Kawabata Art School"). During this time he contributed drawings to such magazines as Shōjo sekai (少女世界, "Girls' World") and Shōnen sekai (少年世界, "Boys' World"). It was during this period that Matsumoto was inspired by illustrator Kōji Fukiya to become an illustrator in the field of girls' media. (Matsumoto's younger sister, Ryōko (龍子), would eventually marry Fukiya.)

Following the devastation of Tokyo, including its publishing industry, in the 1923 Great Kantō earthquake, Matsumoto decided to try his fortunes overseas, and managed to obtain free passage to Shanghai. His hope was to eventually make his way to Paris. In Shanghai, he earned money by contributing illustrations and articles to the Shanhai nichinichi shinbun (上海日日新聞, "Shanghai Daily Newspaper"), but when he turned twenty years of age, he was forced to return to Japan to report for the draft. He was rejected for military service because he was flat footed.

== Early career and marriage ==
A panel from Poku-chan and the Artist circa 1931

Matsumoto's first forum for steady work was the magazine Shōjo Gahō (少女画報, "Girls' Illustrated"), to which he contributed from 1928 to 1938. Matsumoto first ventured into manga in Shōjo Gahō, creating a series of illustrated narratives featuring a lively Chinese girl named Poku-chan, which was irregularly published between November 1930 and March 1934. The Poku-chan strips were drawn in a stylized, almost abstract, Art Deco manner. At around this time, Matsumoto took on Toshiko Ueda as an apprentice.

Matsumoto could draw in a wide range of styles, from the realistic to the near-abstract, but all of his work was distinguished by clean, almost geometrical lines and a strictly Modern sensibility. While he illustrated numerous dramatic girls' novels, his style was better suited to sunny, playful, or humorous work. In 1935, Matsumoto began to work for the magazine that would become his primary forum, Shōjo no tomo (少女の友, "Girls' Friend"). Shōjo no tomo, with its modern, stylish image, was the ideal magazine for Matsumoto.

In 1932, at the age of 28, Matsumoto was wed to Ayako Nimori (二森あや子). They went on to have seven children (four boys, three girls) together. Because Ayako was an only child, the decision was made to have the firstborn male child legally adopted by her parents in order to carry on the Nimori name. On official records, therefore, Ki Nimori (二森騏, born 1933) is listed as the younger brother of Ayako, and therefore the brother-in-law of Matsumoto. (Note: Under the Japanese ie family system that was the law of the land prior to the end of World War II, it was common in cases where there was no male heir for a groom to be legally adopted by his bride's parents and become the successor to her family name. Since Katsuji was himself the eldest son of and successor to the Matsumoto family, this was not an option.)

== Major works ==
=== The Mysterious Clover ===
The cover of The Mysterious Clover circa 1934

In 1934, Matsumoto drew his first full-fledged manga, a 16-page story titled Nazo no kurōbaa (？（なぞ）のクローバー, "The Mysterious Clover"). Printed as an over-sized pamphlet with a sturdy cardboard cover, and included as a premium in the April issue of Shōjo no tomo, The Mysterious Clover was a variation on The Scarlet Pimpernel and Zorro. The protagonist of The Mysterious Clover is a young girl who protects the poor peasants from the cruel and greedy nobles. This work is remarkable for its use of varying angles, including bird's-eye views, and variation in the size of panels. Sakō Shishido (宍戸左行), influenced by American newspaper strips, had used similar techniques in his 1930 Supiido Tarō (スピード太郎, "Speed Tarō"), but in a far cruder drawing style than Matsumoto's. The Mysterious Clover had been neglected for decades by manga scholars until it was displayed at a 2006 exhibition at the Yayoi Art Museum, where it caught the eye of Fusanosuke Natsume, who then wrote about it on his blog and in a newspaper column.

=== Kurukuru Kurumi-chan ===
Matsumoto's most famous work is his manga Kurukuru Kurumi-chan (くるくるクルミちゃん), (Note: "Kurukuru"--くるくる--means "spinning" or "winding", "-chan"--ちゃん--is a diminutive honorific that can be translated as "little" or "dear".) which was serialized in Shōjo no tomo from January 1938 until December 1940. Featuring the daily antics of a little girl named Kurumi (クルミ, meaning "walnut"), each episode was a self-contained story, usually running 4 pages and 22 panels. The strip rarely ventured far from everyday reality, and was characterized by a gradually building absurdity that rarely descended to simple slapstick.

In the earliest episodes, Kurumi-chan is roughly four heads tall, and would seem to be roughly nine or ten years old. Over the years, though, Kurumi's proportions changed, until by the 1950s she had become an extremely stylized character no more than two heads high, and of unknown age.

The strip was revived after the war in the magazine Shōjo ("Girl") under the title Kurumi-chan and ran from November 1949 to February 1954.

=== Book illustrations ===
A page from Matsumoto's adaptation of "The Doll's House" circa 1955, showing the cheerful optimism of Matsumoto's characters.

While working on Kurukuru Kurumi-chan, Matsumoto continued to do freestanding illustrations, in both color and black and white, and also to illustrate girls' fiction and poetry. Matsumoto was one of the most popular and influential illustrators working in girls' media, and he continued to be a popular illustrator through the early 1950s. He worked with such prominent Japanese authors and poets as Nobuko Yoshiya and Yaso Saijō, and adapted many works by non-Japanese author's, including Katherine Mansfield's short story "The Doll's House", to the short-lived genre of emonogatari (絵物語, "picture stories").

Although Matsumoto drew in a wide range of styles, certain features remain consistent. His characters have an air of intelligence without melancholy, and of cheerful optimism that is never saccharine. Other popular illustrators of the day were better suited to the niches in which Matsumoto was not in his element. The multi-talented and enormously popular Jun'ichi Nakahara (中原淳一) drew girls who were intelligent and stylish, but humor was not his forte. In the genre of sentimental melodrama, according to Akiko Horiguchi, no one was more popular than Hiroshi Katsuyama (勝山ひろし). But in an age when print media of all kinds were becoming increasingly visual, there was plenty of work to go around.

=== Children's books and infant merchandise ===
In 1955, Matsumoto abandoned manga altogether. Although he continued to do illustration work in a variety of styles, his focus shifted to the kind of hyper-stylized, wryly adorable character epitomized by the later Kurumi-chan. His target audience accordingly shifted from preteen and low-teen girls to toddlers and young mothers. In addition to illustrating new and original children's books, Matsumoto illustrated numerous classics, including Little Red Riding Hood (1955), Andrew Lang's Blue Fairy Book (1959, translated by Yasunari Kawabata), and various other collections of classic Japanese and European fairy tales.

In 1960, Matsumoto founded Katsu Productions (克プロダクション), which specialized in illustrations for infants and toddlers and designing various infant merchandise. This merchandise was spectacularly popular. Amateur manga scholar and blogger "lacopen" commented that "When I was a child, [Matsumoto's baby] goods were all the rage, so much so that it is no exaggeration to say they were everywhere." His designs for the infant merchandise company known originally as "Sanshin. Inc." were perhaps the mostly widely consumed and recognized, and it has been suggested that the company changed its name to Combi (コンビ) in 1961, which comes from the English "combination" and is used in Japanese to mean "duo") in response to the popularity of the infant duo, "Haamu" (ハーム) and "Monii" (モニー), created by Matsumoto and featured on a wide array of the company's products.

== Retirement and death ==
In 1971, now in his late 60s, Matsumoto built an atelier, "Chijunbō" (稚筍房, "Young Bamboo Shoot Studio") in Kamishiraiwa (上白岩) on the Izu Peninsula, where he turned his creative talents from the modern and cosmopolitan to the traditional and provincial. Using the bamboo that was so plentiful in the area, he designed a variety of toys and objects that could easily be reproduced by the local farmers to sell as souvenirs. For this work, Matsumoto was given a commendation by the Shizuoka Prefectural government. Although these works seem strikingly at odds with Matsumoto's cosmopolitan image, he in fact had always had an eye for the traditional, and was particularly fond of collecting carefully selected Japanese and Korean pottery and furniture. Modern or traditional, Western or Eastern, the common thread that runs through Matsumoto's aesthetic sense, and his work, is an appreciation of that which is refined, simple, elegant, and unpretentious.

In 1986, Matsumoto suffered the last of a series of strokes, and was hospitalized, never to fully regain consciousness again. The stylish Matsumoto had been famously fastidious throughout his life, and his daughter, Meiko, has written that she was startled to notice that on his hospital bed, where Matsumoto lay unconscious and barely responsive, he had been using his remaining good hand to remove the pills that had formed on the old hospital blanket. Furthermore, although doctors said he had lost his sight, Matsumoto would open his eyes, and, as if looking in a mirror, would straighten the hairs of his mustache with his fingers as he had habitually done for years. Matsumoto died at the age of 81. His cremated remains are interred in the Fuji Cemetery in Gotemba, Shizuoka, at the foot of Mount Fuji.

== Estate ==
Matsumoto's children, in addition to Ki Nimori, are, in order of birth: Ikki Matsumoto (松本一騎, born 1935, deceased); Rumi O'Brien (オブライエン瑠美, born 1937, living in the U.S.A.); Motoi Matsumoto (松本基, born 1939); Ken Matsumoto (松本賢, born 1941, deceased); Meiko Matsumoto (松本明子, born 1943); and Michie Utsuhara (宇津原充地栄, born 1945). Two of the first successful female shōjo manga artists of the postwar period, Toshiko Ueda and Setsuko Tamura, were his apprentices. Michie, Matsumoto's youngest child, along with several of her siblings and Matsumoto's grandchildren, manages the Gallery Katsuji Matsumoto (ギャラリーまつもとかつぢ), soon to be renamed the Katsuji Matsumoto Archives (松本かつぢ資料館), the official Katsuji Matsumoto website and its on-line shop, and also writes "Kurumi-chan nikki (クルミちゃん日記, "Kurumi-chan Diary"). The gallery is located at 4-14-18 Tamagawa, Setagaya-ku, Tokyo, 158-0094.
