= Jun'ichi Nakahara =

Japanese illustrator (1913–1983)

- 中原淳一
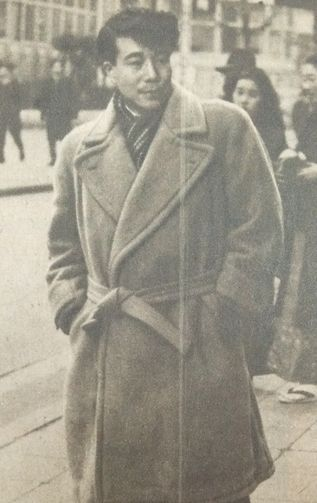
- Nakahara c. 1949
- Born: February 16, 1913; Higashikagawa, Kagawa, Empire of Japan
- Died: April 19, 1983 (aged 70)
- Known for: Graphic design, illustration, fashion design
- Spouse: Kuniko Ashihara

Jun'ichi Nakahara (Japanese: 中原淳一; February 16, 1913 – April 19, 1983) was a Japanese graphic artist and fashion designer born in Higashikagawa. He was also a French doll maker. He became famous as an illustrator in the 1920s when his work appeared in the magazine Shojo No Tomo. According to the scholar Nozomi Masuda, Nakahara "greatly developed the eyes of shojo manga characters".

Nakahara was married to the actress Kuniko Ashihara. The couple had four children, including the painter Shuichi Nakahara.

== See also ==
- Shōjo manga
- Yumeji Takehisa
- Katsuji Matsumoto
