= Nobuko Yoshiya =

Japanese novelist (1896–1973)

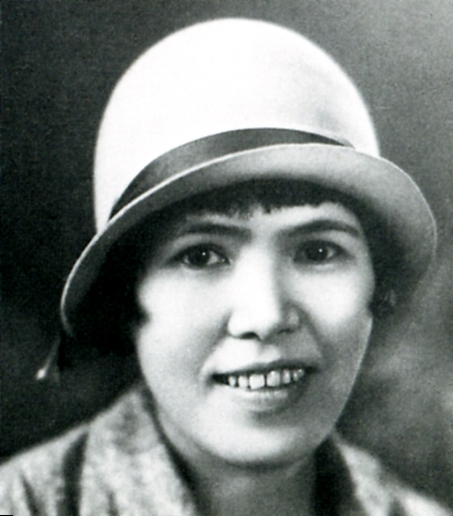
- Nobuko Yoshiya
- Born: 12 January 1896; Niigata, Empire of Japan
- Died: 11 July 1973 (aged 77); Kamakura, Japan
- Occupation: Novelist
- Writing career
- Notable work: Hana Monogatari

Nobuko Yoshiya (吉屋 信子, Yoshiya Nobuko; 12 January 1896 – 11 July 1973) was a Japanese novelist active in Taishō and Shōwa period Japan. She was one of modern Japan's most commercially successful and prolific writers, specializing in serialized romance novels and adolescent girls' fiction, as well as being a pioneer in Japanese lesbian literature, including the Class S genre. Several of her stories have been made into films.

== Personal life ==
Yoshiya was born in Niigata Prefecture, but grew up in Mooka and Tochigi cities in Tochigi Prefecture. Her father was first a police officer and then became a local county government official, so her family relocated often to accommodate his transfers. She was the only daughter and youngest of five children in her family. Both her mother and her father came from samurai families. Her middle-class, culturally conservative parents trained her for the "good wife, wise mother" role expected of women in Meiji Japan. Her literary career began when she was in her teens.

In 1915, she moved to Tokyo, where she began to diverge from Japan's gender expectations. Yoshiya often dressed in an androgynous style, including in magazine photo sessions. She was one of the first Japanese women to emulate Western fashion in the 1920s by cutting her hair short. She designed her own house and was one of the first Japanese women both to own a car and a racehorse.

In 1938, Yoshiya joined the Pen Butai (lit. "Pen Corps"), a government organisation of authors who travelled to the front during the Second Sino-Japanese War to write favourably of Japan's war efforts in China. She and Fumiko Hayashi were the only woman writers in the group.

Yoshiya lived in Kamakura, Kanagawa Prefecture during and after World War II. In 1962, she built a traditional wooden house with Japanese-style garden in a quiet area, which she willed to the city of Kamakura on her death, to be used to promote women's cultural and educational activities. She died at age 77 of colon cancer. Her house is now the Yoshiya Nobuko Memorial Museum, and preserves the study as she left it, with items such as handwritten manuscripts and favorite objects on display. The museum is open only twice a year, in early May and November, for three days each time. Her grave is at the temple of Kōtoku-in in Kamakura.

=== Relationship with Chiyo Monma ===
In January 1923, Yoshiya met Chiyo Monma (門馬 千代, Monma Chiyo) , a mathematics teacher at a girls' school in Tokyo. They would go on to have a romantic relationship for over 50 years. Unlike many Japanese public figures, she was not reticent about revealing details of her personal life through photographs, personal essays, and magazine interviews. In 1926, they established a collaborative working relationship of author and secretary. In 1957, Yoshiya adopted Monma as her daughter, the only legal way for lesbians to share property and make medical decisions for each other at the time. They both traveled together to Manchuria, Soviet Union, stayed for a year in Paris, and then returned via the United States to Japan from 1927–1928. In the late 1930s, they also visited the Dutch East Indies and French Indochina.

== Literary career ==
One of Yoshiya's early works, Hana Monogatari ( 花物語 "Flower Tales", 1916–1924), a series of fifty-two tales of romantic friendships, became popular among female students. Most of the relationships presented in Flower Tales are about unrequited love, pining from afar, and/or have unhappy endings. These stories often depict female-female desire with a dreamy writing style.

Yaneura no nishojo ( 屋根裏の二處女 "Two Virgins in the Attic", 1919) is thought to be semi-autobiographical, and describes a female-female love experience between dormmates. In the last scene, the two girls decide to live together as a couple. This work criticizes a male-oriented society and presents a strong feminist attitude.

Her Chi no hate made ("To the Ends of the Earth", 1920), won a literary prize from The Asahi Shimbun, and reflects some Christian influence.

In 1925, Yoshiya began her own magazine, Kuroshoubi (Black Rose), which she discontinued after eight months. After Black Rose, Yoshiya began presenting adult same-sex love as being akin to sisterhood and complementary to heterosexuality.

Yoshiya's other major works include Onna no yujo ("Women's Friendship", 1933–1934), Otto no Teiso ( 良人の貞操 "A Husband's Chastity", 1936–1937), Onibi (鬼火 "Demon Fire", 1951), Atakake no hitobito ( 安宅家の人々 "The Ataka Family", 1964–1965), Tokugawa no fujintachi ( 徳川の夫人たち "Tokugawa Women", 1966), and Nyonin Heike ( 女人平家 "Ladies of the Heike", 1971)

=== Literary style ===
Her stories of dosei-ai (same-sex love) and of female friendships had a direct influence on later shōjo manga. This was particularly reflected in the development and popularization of the unique Japanese genre Class S, one of the main inspirers and influential authors was Yoshiya. By creating works in this genre, she was able both to strengthen the romantic friendship in Japanese culture for many years to come, and to become one of the pioneers of Japanese lesbian literature.

Yoshiya explored two main themes throughout her work: friendship between women and the idea of the "ideal" male, her works are keenly aware of contemporary sexology. A characteristic element of her style is the image of a very close female friendship as a platonic love between girls, often passing along with their youth, but allowing girls to socialize and build strong bonds based on love and sisterhood. This gave her friendship description a rather melodramatic look, full of romantic metaphors or overt lesbian subtext, due to this, many of her stories actually represented the image of lesbian attachment as an important and strong relationship, which, however, was a fleeting element of youth and passed along with the maturation of the girl and her marriage.

Although Yoshiya herself was never “out” in the modern sense of the word, she openly lived in a lesbian relationship with another woman. In connection with this fact, many of her works, especially early ones, are considered by literary critics as semi-autobiographical or even the first Japanese works in the genre of lesbian literature. As already mentioned, this was especially felt in her early works, often depicting unrequited love or craving from afar, which can be viewed as a subtle depiction of the author's personal youth lesbian experience. Her work in this period often has a sad and cruel ending, making extensive use of death from unrequited love or the double suicide of girls as a result of the threat of marriage to their relationship. In the future, these tropes will be widely used in the early works of yuri as a way to make the story more melodramatic and save the work from censorship, which did not allow a positive image of lesbian relations.

At the same time, although she continued to develop her sensual, nostalgic and emotional narrative style, the relationship between the heroines in her subsequent works began to be portrayed as more platonic, rather idealizing friendship and sisterhood between innocent girls, than any open or implied lesbian attachments. During this period, she gained wide recognition as the author of youth women's literature, because of the platonic nature of the relationship, her work was not considered as something amoral, and girls and young adult woman found attractive her ideas of eternal friendship, idealized sisterhood and a realistic depiction of the lives of women of today to her.

== Political views ==
Though an ardent feminist, Yoshiya mistrusted political parties and never became active in the organized Japanese feminist movement.

== See also ==
- Japanese literature
- List of Japanese authors
