= Miyako Maki =

Japanese manga artist (born 1935)

Miyako Maki 牧 美也子
- Born: July 29, 1935 (age 91) Kobe, Hyōgo Prefecture, Japan
- Area: Manga artist
- Spouse: Leiji Matsumoto

Miyako Maki (牧 美也子, Maki Miyako; born July 29, 1935) is a Japanese manga artist, and one of the earliest female manga artists. During the 1960s, Maki contributed significantly to the development of shōjo manga (manga for girls), and became one of the most popular shōjo authors of her generation. She later became a pioneer in manga for adults, producing gekiga and redikomi towards the end of that decade.

She is the widow of manga artist Leiji Matsumoto, with whom she has collaborated with on multiple works. Miyako created Licca-chan, a popular Japanese doll manufactured by Takara. Works by Maki have been awarded the Japan Cartoonists Association Award, the Montreal International Comic Contest prize, and the Shogakukan Manga Award.

== Early life ==
Miyako Maki was born July 29, 1935, in Kobe, Hyōgo Prefecture. She did not discover manga until graduating from high school – her parents started a book distribution company in Osaka which distributed manga, and Maki became interested by the possibilities of expression offered by the medium. After realizing that manga was the best way to express her thoughts, she began her career as a manga artist in 1957.

== Career ==
=== Shōjo manga ===
Maki created her first manga in 1957. She presented it to the director of Tokodo, the publisher of Osamu Tezuka's works. Tokodo refused to publish her manga, but provided her with Tezuka's original manuscript for Red Snow to develop her craft. Maki then created her second manga, Haha Koi Warutsu (母恋いワルツ), which was accepted for publication. She moved to Tokyo and began work for major publishers such as Kodansha, Kobunsha and Shogakukan.

During her early career, Maki took inspiration from Tezuka's graphic and narrative style from his books as well his lectures. In 1958, Macoto Takahashi published his first manga, Arashi o koete. In it, Takahashi pioneered the graphic style of sutairu-ga, a decorative style that magnifies the emotions of the characters, as opposed to Tezuka's dynamic techniques which focus on the action of the characters. Maki was among the first waves of artists to embrace sutairu-ga, starting with her manga Shōjo Sannin that was published in August 1958. Sutairu-ga was quickly established in shōjo manga and became a distinctive quality of shōjo as compared to shōnen manga (manga for boys).

Common topics and themes of Maki's shōjo manga include ballet, the search for family love (a genre known as haha-mono), and the pursuit of dreams. These ideas were taken from Maki's young girlish feelings, while frustrated by the shortages caused by World War II. These works are distinguished by their contemporary Japanese settings, contrasting mainstream shōjo manga of the era that often depicted a fantasized and idealized West.

=== Collaborations with Leiji Matsumoto ===
Maki became acquainted with multiple manga artists in Tokyo, including Tezuka, Leiji Matsumoto and Tetsuya Chiba. Maki married Matsumoto in 1961, and they began to collaborate on manga together. At the time, Matsumoto specialised in shōjo manga featuring cute animal characters, though he wanted to orient himself towards shōnen and animation.

In their collaborations, Maki was tasked with drawing the female characters while Matsumoto drew the male and animal characters. Their collaborations integrate elements typical of both shōjo and shōnen, as in Watashi no Eru (1964), which incorporates both the cinematic style typical of shōnen and the more decorative style based on sutairu-ga and shōjo.

In pursuit of Matsumoto's dream of creating animation, they shot Gin no Kinoko (銀のきのこ; The Silver Mushroom) like an animation, frame-by-frame. Through these collaborations, Maki influenced Matsumoto to design strong and combative female characters, on par with male characters, becoming one of the first artists to develop such characters in shōnen.

=== Licca-chan ===
The success of Miyako Maki's characters caught the attention of the toy maker Takara. Takara was inspired by the faces and proportions of Maki's characters to create the Licca-chan doll. The first Licca-chan was sold in 1967 and accompanied by a brochure with an illustration by Maki. The doll was successful and dominated the market for the following decades. While Maki is credited as the originator of the doll's prototype, she does not own any copyright to it.

=== Gekiga and manga for adults ===
Maki's interests evolved over time, and she began to abandon romantic stories aimed at young girls to write manga with realistic narratives aimed at an adult female audience. These stories were not suitable for the shōjo magazines which she worked at, however. In 1968, magazines dedicated to a male audience of young adults approached Maki and asked her to create manga for them. The first magazine to do so was Bessatsu Action who were looking for a manga artist team to redraw the works of Masaki Tsuji. Following this project, she decided to create her own manga in the gekiga style: Mashūko Banka (1968) published in the women's magazine Josei Seven. Subsequently, she continued to write gekiga for women's and men's magazines.

To create her gekiga, Maki was inspired by the work of Kazuo Kamimura, in particular his atmosphere and his stories centered on the lives of strong women. In her stories, she strived to represent women who seek freedom, especially sexual freedom, from the taboos of the time.

In 1975, the city of Montreal, Canada, organised the Montreal International Comic Contest. Japanese critic Kōsei Ono, a member of the jury, asked several Japanese authors to participate in the competition, including Maki. The jury assessed a single comic strip on the quality of the drawing. Maki sent a sheet of the story The Narcissus with Red Lips from her gekiga Seiza no onna and won first prize of the competition, becoming the first manga to be internationally awarded.

With Miyako Maki being the first woman to write manga for an adult audience, she paved the way for the creation of redikomi with the help of authors like Masako Watanabe or Hideko Mizuno who joined her shortly afterwards.

== Awards and adaptations ==
Maki won the Japan Cartoonists Association Award for Excellence in 1974 for Himon no onna (緋紋の女). In 1975, she won the Montreal International Comic Contest for Seiza no onna (星座の女) and later received the 1989 Shogakukan Manga Award (General category) for Genji Monogatari. Two of her manga, Netsu ai and Akujo seisho, have been adapted as television series and another, Koibito misaki, was adapted for the cinema.

== Sources ==
- Beaujean, Stéphane (February 2015). "Miyako Maki: pionnière du manga". Kaboom. Vol. 8. Translated by Aurélien Estager.
- Fujimoto, Yukari (2012). "Takahashi Macoto: The Origin of Shōjo Manga Style". Mechademia. 7 (1). Translated by Thorn, Rachel: 24–55. doi:10.5749/minnesota/9780816680498.003.0002. ISBN 9780816680498.
- Hébert, Xavier (2010). "L'esthétique shōjo, de l'illustration au manga: De l'origine des « grands yeux » aux mises en pages éclatées". Le manga au féminin: articles, chroniques, entretiens et mangas. Versailles: Éditions H. ISBN 978-2-9531781-4-2.
- Kálovics, Dalma (2016). "The missing link of shōjo manga history: the changes in 60s shōjo manga as seen through the magazine Shūkan Margaret" (PDF). Kyōto Seika Daigaku Kiyō (49). Kyoto Seika University. Archived (PDF) from the original on November 4, 2019.
- Maki, Miyako (2015). La fleur du requiem. Poitiers: Le Lézard noir. ISBN 978-2-35348-070-8.
- Monden, Masafumi (June 2014). "Layers of the Ethereal: A Cultural Investigation of Beauty, Girlhood, and Ballet in Japanese Shōjo Manga". Fashion Theory. 18 (3): 251–295. doi:10.2752/175174114X13938552557808. S2CID 191664287.
- Okazaki, Manami (July 8, 2017). "Living Doll: Licca-chan's Legacy Lives On". The Japan Times.
- Shamoon, Deborah Michelle (2012). "The Formation of Postwar Shōjo Manga, 1950–1969". Passionate Friendship: The Aesthetics of Girls' Culture in Japan. Honolulu: University of Hawaiʻi Press. ISBN 978-0-82483-542-2.
- Toku, Masami (2007). "Shojo Manga! Girls' Comics! A Mirror of Girls' Dreams". Mechademia. 2 (1): 19–32. doi:10.1353/mec.0.0013. S2CID 120302321.
- Toku, Masami, ed. (2015). "Profile and Interview with Miyako Maki". International Perspectives on Shojo and Shojo Manga: The Influence of Girl Culture. Routledge. pp. 168–174. ISBN 978-1-31761-075-5.
