= Otomechikku =

Manga genre

Otomechikku (Japanese: 乙女ちっく; lit. "maidenesque") or otome-chikku is a subgenre of shōjo manga (Japanese girls' comics) that emerged in the 1970s. Stories in the subgenre focus on the lives and exploits of protagonists who are ordinary Japanese teenage girls, a narrative style that emerged in response to the ascendance of exotic, glamorous, and internationally focused shōjo manga throughout the decade. Otomechikku is most commonly associated with manga published in the magazine Ribon, and is noted by critics for its influence on the aesthetic of kawaii.

== Etymology ==
The term otomechikku is a portmanteau of the following words:

- Otome (乙女), also frequently written in hiragana, which translates literally to "maiden". The term is used to refer to girls, and carries a connotation of innocence and purity.
- Chikku (ちっく), also frequently written in katakana, which is roughly equivalent to the suffixes "-ique" or "-esque" and transforms the noun into an adjective.

"Otomechikku" can thus roughly be translated as "maidenesque". In addition to describing a subgenre of manga, the term is occasionally used as a pejorative to emphasize the childishness or feminineness of that which the speaker is describing.

== Characteristics ==
=== Narrative ===
Otomechikku manga typically focuses on a school-aged girl, usually a middle school or high school student but more rarely a college student, in an ordinary environment (home, school, etc.) who develops friendly, filial, and romantic relationships with other people in those environments. A popular formula for otomechikku stories is gakuen-mono (学園物; lit. 'school story'), which focuses on romance in a school or other campus environment.

The protagonist of an otomechikku manga typically does not possess any particularly notable traits: she is neither especially beautiful nor intelligent, is frequently shy and unassuming, but is invariably kawaii ("adorable" or "loveable"). Often, the character displays imperfections, fragility, and a need to be protected. This protection and validation is most commonly granted to her by a male love interest, who accepts her as she is and maintains a chaste relationship with her, but it can also come from professional achievement in a kawaii field, such as a picture book author or puppeteer.

=== Style ===
Cover to a notebook published by Ribon in 1981 with artwork by Ako Mutsu, a pioneering otomechikku artist. The fine lines, kawaii characters, and Ivy League fashions are all visual hallmarks of otomechikku manga.

The visual style of otomechikku is distinguished from that of other shōjo manga of its era through its use of fine and delicate lines, as well as by the significant use of white space in order to suggest emotion and contemplation. Characters possess a morphology aligned with the characteristics of kawaii: round faces, large starry eyes, and a head that is disproportionately large relative to the rest of their body. Particular attention is paid to the characters' clothing, with American-inspired fashions influenced by the Ivy League appearing as a common style. Decorative elements are typically cute or romantic, with patterns based on flowers or heart motifs.

== History ==
From the 1950s to the 1970s, shōjo manga tended to depict exotic, glamorous, and international (particularly European) settings and characters. This tendency reached its apex in the 1970s in the works of many of the artists associated with the Year 24 Group, an emergent grouping of shōjo artists whose works depicted fantastical European and otherworldly settings, and whose characters occasionally transgressed social conventions around gender. Year 24 Group member Yumiko Ōshima was an exception in this regard, with many of her works featuring contemporary Japanese settings and ordinary characters who readers could easily identify with. Ōshima's soft, cute, and ethereal artistic style influenced several artists associated with the manga magazine Ribon in the early 1970s, such as Ako Mutsu (debuted in 1972), Yumiko Tabuchi (debuted in 1970), and Hideko Tachikake (debuted in 1973).

Manga by Mutsu, Tabuchi, and Tachikake was initially published in Ribon under the genre name otomechikku roman (乙女チック・ロマン; lit. "maidenesque romance"). Works in the genre were first published in 1973, primarily by artists in Ribon but also by artists such as Fusako Kuramochi and Mariko Iwadate. The genre began to proliferate in 1976 and reached its peak of popularity by the end of the decade. During the 1980s, Ribon reoriented its editorial lineup towards a younger readership, which resulted in otomechikku artists departing the magazine and the general decline and demise of the subgenre itself.

Subsequent artists who were influenced by otomechikku, such as Koi Ikeno and Aoi Hiiragi, continued the otomechikku convention of love stories focused on ordinary protagonists, but with notable stylistic or thematic variations such as the integration of fantasy elements. In manga, elements of otomechikku narratives continue to be reflected in school romance stories, which remains a popular subgenre of shōjo manga. Outside of manga, otomechikku was an influence on Japanese women's magazines such as An An and Olive, as well as on 1980s expressions of the kawaii aesthetic.

== Analysis ==
Sociologist Shinji Miyadai considers otomechikku manga as serving as a learning framework for young female readers, allowing them to position themselves in relation to the world around them. Anthropologist Jennifer Prough similarly likens otomechikku manga to monogatari and the Bildungsroman genre through its focus of stories about teenage girls as they mature into adulthood. Manga scholar Yukari Fujimoto argues that otomechikku stories that are focused on professional achievement function as a model for girl readers to pursue both romance and professional ambitions simultaneously, while still conforming to traditional gender norms.

Miyadai further argues that the emergence of otomechikku makes it possible to divide shōjo manga of the 1970s and 1980s into three categories, distinguished by their respective artists and tone: intellectual works by the Year 24 Group, dramatic works by artists such as Machiko Satonaka and Yukari Ichijō, and otomechikku. Miyadai notes how otomechikku takes a "realistic" approach to its narratives, with heroines that reflect their female readers and their environments, contrasting the other two categories which may focus on material that is unfamiliar or difficult to relate to.

== See also ==
- Otome game
