= Another (novel) =

Japanese novel, manga and anime series

- Novel cover art
- Genre: Horror; Mystery; Supernatural thriller
- Serial novel
- Written by: Yukito Ayatsuji
- Published by: Kadokawa Shoten
- English publisher: NA: Yen Press
- Magazine: Yasei Jidai
- Published: October 29, 2009
- Manga
- Written by: Yukito Ayatsuji
- Illustrated by: Hiro Kiyohara
- Published by: Kadokawa Shoten
- English publisher: NA: Yen Press
- Magazine: Young Ace
- Original run: April 3, 2010 – December 3, 2011
- Volumes: 4
- Manga

Another 0
- Written by: Yukito Ayatsuji
- Illustrated by: Hiro Kiyohara
- Published by: Kadokawa Shoten
- English publisher: NA: Yen Press
- Magazine: Young Ace
- Original run: December 28, 2011 – February 3, 2012
- Volumes: 1
- Anime television series
- Directed by: Tsutomu Mizushima
- Written by: Ryō Higaki
- Music by: Kow Otani
- Studio: P.A. Works
- Licensed by: AUS: Hanabee; NA: Sentai Filmworks; UK: MVM Films
- Original network: KNB, KBS, Tokyo MX, CTC
- English network: NA: Anime Network
- Original run: January 10, 2012 – March 27, 2012
- Episodes: 12
- Original video animation

The Other -Karma-
- Directed by: Tsutomu Mizushima
- Written by: Ryō Higaki
- Music by: Kow Otani
- Studio: P.A. Works
- Licensed by: AUS: Hanabee; UK: MVM Films
- Released: May 26, 2012
- Novel

Another: Episode S
- Written by: Yukito Ayatsuji
- Published by: Kadokawa Shoten
- English publisher: NA: Yen Press
- Published: July 31, 2013
- Serial novel

Another 2001
- Written by: Yukito Ayatsuji
- Published by: Kadokawa Shoten
- English publisher: NA: Yen Press
- Magazine: Yasei Jidai
- Published: September 30, 2020
- Other
- Another (2012 live-action film)

Another is a Japanese mystery horror serial novel by Yukito Ayatsuji origially published between August 2006 and May 2009 by Kadokawa Shoten. The series, set in the fictionalized version of Toyama Prefecture between 1972 and 1998, focuses on a boy named Kōichi Sakakibara who, upon transferring into Yomiyama Middle School and meeting a mysterious girl named Mei Misaki, finds himself in a mystery revolving around students and people related to his class falling victim to gruesome, senseless deaths.

A manga adaptation by Hiro Kiyohara was serialized between May 2010 and January 2012 in the issues of Kadokawa Shoten's Young Ace. Both the novel and the manga have been licensed in North America by Yen Press. A 12-episode anime television series produced by P.A. Works aired in Japan between January and March 2012, with an original video animation episode released in May, and a live-action film of the same name was released in Japanese theaters in August.

== Plot ==
In 1972, Misaki, a popular student of Yomiyama North Middle School's class 3-3, suddenly died partway through the school year. Devastated by the loss, the students and teacher of class 3-3 continued to behave as though Misaki was still alive, leading to a strange presence shown within the graduation photo. In Spring 1998, Kōichi Sakakibara transfers into Yomiyama's class 3-3, where he meets Mei Misaki, a quiet student whom their classmates as well as the teacher seemingly ignore. The class is soon caught up in a strange phenomenon, in which students and their relatives begin to die in often peculiarly gruesome ways. Realizing that these deaths are related to the long deceased "Misaki of 1972", a yearly calamity that has struck most every class 3-3 since 1972, Kōichi and Mei seek to figure out how to stop it before it kills anymore of their classmates or them.

== Characters ==
=== Main characters ===
Kōichi Sakakibara (榊原 恒一, Sakakibara Kōichi)
Voiced by: Atsushi Abe (Japanese); Greg Ayres (English)
Played by: Kento Yamazaki (live-action film)
A 15-year-old boy who transferred to Yomiyama North Middle's Class 3-3 from Tokyo in 1998, but was hospitalized due to pneumothorax before the school year began. Kōichi stays with his grandparents and aunt Reiko, while his father conducts research in India. He befriends Mei Misaki despite warnings against doing so, and works with his classmates to uncover the truth behind the curse of Class 3-3.^{[ch. 1]}
Mei Misaki (見崎 鳴, Misaki Mei)
Voiced by: Natsumi Takamori (Japanese); Monica Rial (English)
Played by: Ai Hashimoto (live-action film)
An unusual girl who wears a white eyepatch over her left eye,^{[ch. 1]} Kōichi first meets her on the elevator of Yūmigaoka Hospital, as she is going to deliver a doll to her "poor other half" in the second basement (it comes out in bits that her other half is deceased, her cousin, and later is revealed to be her twin sister in episode 10).^{[ch. 1]} At school, she is completely ignored by her classmates. When Kōichi goes out of his way to try to interact with her, she warns him not to, but relents and gradually opens up to him about her situation after Kōichi is also ignored by the class.^{[ch. 8]} She reveals to Kōichi that her left eye is a doll's eye, and that she has a special ability,^{[ch. 3]} noting later in the story that she is able to see the "color of death", that is, identify people who are dead and those close to death.^{[ch. 17]}

=== Kōichi's relatives ===
Yōsuke Sakakibara (榊原 陽介, Sakakibara Yōsuke)
Voiced by: Takurō Kitagawa (Japanese); Christopher Ayres (English)
Kōichi's widowed father and Reiko's brother-in-law, is a college professor who is doing research in India. He regularly calls his son to chat, but does not give much detail about their family background, opting instead to complain about the heat. The phone connection typically becomes filled with static and drops just as Yōsuke might say something informative.
Ritsuko Sakakibara (榊原 理津子, Sakakibara Ritsuko)
Kōichi's mother and Reiko's older sister, she died 15 years ago right after giving birth to him. She was a student in Yomiyama Middle School's Class 3-3 back in 1972, and was thus one of Misaki Yomiyama's classmates.^{[ch. 1]} It is later revealed that she died while Reiko was in Class 3-3; and was therefore a victim of the curse that year. Her maiden name was Ritsuko Mikami (三神 理津子, Mikami Ritsuko).
Reiko Mikami (三神 怜子, Mikami Reiko)
Voiced by: Naoko Sakakibara (Reiko), Misayo Miyamaki (Ms. Mikami) (Note: The voice actor "Misayo Miyamaki" was a pseudonym, with the name being an anagram for Misaki Yomiyama) (Japanese); Molly Searcy (English)
Played by: Ai Kato (live-action film)
Kōichi's aunt and Ritsuko's younger sister. She has been hanging out with Koichi at the grandparents home while Koichi's dad has been away. At the beginning of the story, she gives him advice about Yomiyama Middle School through a series of "rules".^{[ch. 1]} She usually returns home exhausted after work.^{[ch. 4,6]} She was in class 3-3 15 years ago when Koichi's mother died.^{[ch. 6]} It is later revealed that she is also Ms. Mikami (三神先生, Mikami sensei), the Class 3-3's assistant homeroom teacher, and that the fourth rule she gave Koichi was to separate their home life from their school life; thus, Kōichi addresses her as Reiko at home and Ms. Mikami at school. During the events of Koichi's summer camp trip, Mei discovers and Koichi realizes that Reiko has been the Casualty, that is, the spirit who triggers the deaths of those in class 3-3 or their relatives. Her back story shows that she was Class 3-3's homeroom teacher two years ago,^{[ch. 10]} but that she had drowned.^{[ch. 19]}

=== Mei's relatives ===
Kirika (霧果)
Voiced by: Hitomi Harada (Japanese); Tiffany Grant (English)
She is an artist and the owner of "Blue Eyes Empty to All, In the Twilight of Yomi", a ball-jointed doll store and museum.^{[ch. 3]} Kōichi later confirms she is Mei Misaki's adoptive mother,^{[ch. 8]} but they have a somewhat distant relationship where they talk to each other like strangers.^{[ch. 9]} Mei reveals that her mother had a stillbirth 12 years ago, which made her obsessed with dolls; this hobby has led to her and Mei treating each other as strangers.^{[ch. 17]} Her real name is Yukiyo Misaki (見崎 ユキヨ, Misaki Yukiyo).^{[ch. 17]}
Misaki Fujioka (藤岡 未咲, Fujioka Misaki)
Voiced by: Hiromi Igarashi
First introduced as Mei's "other half"^{[ch. 1]} and later as her cousin,^{[ch. 3]} she was the person whom Mei was delivering a present to at the basement of Yūmigaoka Hospital,^{[ch. 1]} where Kōichi learns houses the memorial chapel.^{[ch. 2]} In reality, she is Mei's twin sister, raised separately after birth, though they occasionally met each other. Has a more cheerful personality than Mei. Misaki and Mei's biological mother is named Mitsuyo.^{[ch. 17]} Misaki died in the hospital from leukemia in April.
Amane (天根, Amane)
Voiced by: Sayuri Sadaoka (Japanese); Vicki Barosh (English)
The receptionist at the doll shop and museum.^{[ch. 3]} Whenever she sees Kōichi, she offers him a student-discounted admission to their museum.^{[ch. 3,5]} Mei later reveals that she is her grand-aunt.^{[ch. 8]}

=== Yomiyama North Middle School ===
==== Class 3-3 students ====
Tomohiko Kazami (風見 智彦, Kazami Tomohiko)
Voiced by: Mitsuhiro Ichiki (Japanese); Jessie James Grelle (English), Takashi Waka (live-action film)
He's one of the class delegates and a glasses-wearing honor student.^{[ch. 1]} He and Teshigawara are childhood friends.^{[ch. 1]}
Yukari Sakuragi (桜木 ゆかり, Sakuragi Yukari)
Voiced by: Ai Nonaka (Japanese); Brittney Karbowski (English), Maya Okano (live-action film)
The class 3-3 representative for the girls side.^{[ch. 1,5]} Her appearance is friendly. In May, when she learns that her mother died in a car accident, she ends up falling down the stairs and impaling her neck on the sharp end of her umbrella.^{[ch. 4]}
Naoya Teshigawara (敕使河原直哉, Teshigawara Naoya)
Voiced by: Tomoaki Maeno (Japanese); Chris Patton (English), Kiyotaka Uji (live-action film)
A classmate who befriends Kōichi, whom he nicknames "Sakaki".^{[ch. 1]} His appearance is a little taller than other boys and cheery. A sports lover with a superficial personality, he was asked to explain the situation to Kōichi but has trouble going through with it.^{[vol. 1]}
Yūya Mochizuki (望月 優矢, Mochizuki Yūya)
Voiced by: Kazutomi Yamamoto (Japanese); Clint Bickham (English), Kai Inowaki (live-action film)
A schoolmate and member of the Art Club.^{[ch. 3]} He along with Teshigawara help Kōichi unravel the 3-3 calamity. Kōichi thinks he has a crush on Ms. Mikami, the assistant homeroom teacher, as he often inquires as to her health and whereabouts.^{[ch. 3]}
Yumi Ogura (小椋 由美, Ogura Yumi)
Voiced by: Iori Nomizu (Japanese); Tiffany Grant (English), Ayana (live-action film)
One of the students of 9 Grade Class 3 in 1998. She is friends with Takako Sugiura and Izumi Akazawa in her duties as the head of countermeasures, acting as her right and left hands. She is a kind and shy person. The deaths of her brother Atsushi and Aya makes her lose her mind and sanity. In the anime, she tries to kill Mei, believing her to be an extra student, but she falls down from the second floor and breaks her neck. In the manga, she briefly appears talking with Mei; and in the novel, she always stays in the company of Izumi's group. She survives the curse in these adaptions. In the live-action film, she appears in some scenes and doesn't speak a lot, and later she survives the Inn incident.
Izumi Akazawa (赤沢 泉美, Akazawa Izumi)
Voiced by: Madoka Yonezawa (Japanese); Jessica Boone (English), Mika Akizuki (live-action film)
A student in charge of countermeasures, she devises and upholds means to deal with the calamity of Class 3-3.^{[ch. 3,6,7]} She replaces her friend Yukari as the class representative on the girls side in June.^{[ch. 7]} She resents Mei and Kōichi for breaking the class rule of not interacting with the person who is "not there", feeling that their actions have undermined the countermeasures and have caused the deaths to continue.^{[ch. 6,11]} In the novel, during the summer trip, she is pursued by Mineko Numata, and dies from falling off a veranda and breaking her neck. In the anime, she dies from blood loss after being impaled by multiple glass shards. In the manga and anime, her hair is styled in bunches. In the afterword of the manga series, Ayatsuji wrote that Akazawa was a supporting character in the novels, but that manga artist Kiyohara give her a bigger role, which worked well for the climax and the big twist in the adaptation.^{[vol. Omnibus:afterword]}
Takako Sugiura (杉浦 多佳子, Sugiura Takako)
Voiced by: Misato Fukuen (Japanese); Emily Neves (English), Mana Konno (live-action film)
A student of 9th Grade Class 3 in 1998. She is friends with Yumi Ogura and Izumi Akazawa as the countermeasures's personal right-arm. She is a young girl and cares deeply about her friends. She has a crush on Junta in the anime. She used to attend the same school with Mei's twin sister, which made her believe that Mei is the extra student. Junta's death makes her lose her mind; she tries to kill Mei, but gets stuck in the cables and dies. In the manga, she dies in the fire; and in the novel, she is killed by Mineko. In the live-action film, she survives these encounters, and is protected by Tomohiko.
Ikuo Takabayashi (高林郁夫, Takabayashi Ikuo)
Voiced by: Shou Takano (Japanese); Blake Shepard (English)
A classmate who is noted to occasionally miss school because of his weak heart condition. His appearance is thin and a bit smaller than other boys. He is usually seen sitting at the sidelines during P.E. In June, he suffers a fatal heart attack.^{[ch. 7]}
Junta Nakao (中尾 順太, Nakao Junta)
Voiced by: Kengo Kawanishi (Japanese); Houston Hayes (English)
He appears to have a crush on Akazawa, which is what drives his decision to participate in the summer trip, during which he died, making him one of the seven "Deaths of August".
Manabu Maejima (前島 学, Maejima Manabu)
Voiced by: Keisuke Koumoto
A member of the kendo club. He died during the summer trip when he was stabbed by Takabayashi's grandmother from the back, he's one of the seven "Deaths of August".
Shigeki Yonemura (米村 茂樹, Yonemura Shigeki)
He is a ranked A student in class. He died during the summer trip, one of the seven "Deaths of August".

==== Faculty ====
Shōji Kubodera (久保寺紹二, Kubodera Shōji)
Voiced by: Kōzō Mito (Japanese); David Matranga (English)
Class 3-3 homeroom teacher.^{[ch. 1]} In July, after realizing that the countermeasures to the Class 3-3 calamity are not working, he kills his bedridden mother by smothering her with a pillow the night before stabbing himself in the neck in front of the class.^{[ch. 11,12]}
Tatsuji Chibiki (千曳 辰治, Chibiki Tatsuji)
Voiced by: Hiroaki Hirata (Japanese); David Wald (English), Yoshihiko Hakamaka (live-action film)
Reiko describes him as the "ruler" of the secondary library. He typically dresses in all black.^{[ch. 3]} He was the teacher for Class 3-3 in 1972, the year Misaki Yomiyama died. Some years later, he resigned as a teacher but stayed on as librarian, claiming that he was "running away [from the curse]" but, staying nearby out of guilt. Since then, he's kept a record of the phenomena, the deceased and their connections; and shares his findings with Kōichi and Mei.^{[ch. 10]}

=== Others ===
Misaki Yomiyama (夜見山 岬, Yomiyama Misaki)
The honor student from Yomiyama Middle School's Class 3-3 in 1972. He was extremely popular and well-liked by his peers and teachers. He died in a house fire that also claimed the lives of both his brother and his family. His classmates were so heartbroken by his untimely death and could not accept it, that at school they pretended as if he was still alive, which led to a mysterious photo with the supposedly dead Misaki in it.^{[ch. 1,15]}
Sanae Mizuno (水野 沙苗, Mizuno Sanae)
Voiced by: Seiko Yoshida (Japanese); Carli Mosier (English), Hiroko Sato (live-action film)
A nurse at Yūmigaoka Hospital who befriends Koichi. A running gag is that she is accident-prone.^{[ch. 1,2,5]} She has a younger brother named Takeru in Class 3-3.^{[ch. 4]} She tries to assist Kōichi in unraveling the mystery of Yomiyama North by giving him information she gleans from discussions with her colleagues and her brother.^{[ch. 3,5]} In June, she is killed when the elevator she was riding on breaks its cable and falls down the shaft; the impact causes the ceiling beam to fall on her.^{[ch. 6,7]}
Katsumi Matsunaga (松永 克己, Matsunaga Katsumi)
Voiced by: Shinya Takahashi (Japanese); Illich Guardiola (English)
A former Yomiyama North Middle School student from Class 3-3 of 1983, and one of Reiko's classmates. During their summer trip, when he had killed a classmate, he discovers that the other people in the class suddenly have no knowledge of that classmate. He realizes he had killed the Casualty, making this the only known case of the phenomenon stopping halfway through the year.^{[ch. 14,15]} He recorded his theories and confession on an audio cassette and hid it in the school for future students to find.^{[ch. 15]} After graduation, he moved to Tokyo to pursue his studies. He became a banker, but quit after a few years, returning to Yomiyama to help with the family business. He is a regular at Inoya Cafė, where Tomoka Inose works.^{[ch. 13]}
Tomoka Inose (猪瀬 知香, Inose Tomoka)
Voiced by: Mahiro Inoue (Japanese); Maggie Flecknoe (English)
Yūya's older half-sister. A waitress at Inoya Cafė, she attended Yomiyama North Middle School during 1983, though she was not part of Class 3-3. Although aware of the rumors about said class, she did not believe them until Yūya, fearing for his life, explained the situation to her. Katsumi Matsunaga is a regular at the cafe where she works.^{[ch. 13]}
Mineko Numata (沼田 峯子, Numata Mineko)
Voiced by: Rie Takahashi (Japanese); Vicki Barosh (English)
Ikuo Takabayashi's grandmother. A gentle warm-hearted grandmother, though she proved to be an insane crone murderer due to Ikuo's death. In the novel, she is responsible for the murder of Manabu Maejima, Izumi Akazawa, Takako Sugiura, Junta Nakao, Shigeki Yonemura, and her husband Kensaku during the summer trip. She then proceeded to commit suicide by biting off her tongue, making her along with her husband one of the seven "Deaths of August". In the anime, she is not directly responsible for Sugiura's or Akazawa's death, and she was killed with a frying pan by Izumi, saving Yūya Mochizuki and Naoya Teshigawara.

== Media ==
=== Novels ===
Another is a 487-page novel written by Yukito Ayatsuji. The novel was originally serialized in Kadokawa Shoten's literary magazine Yasai Jidai in intermittent periods between the August 2006 and May 2009 issues. A compiled tankōbon volume was published on October 29, 2009 and a two-volume bunkobon edition was released on November 25, 2011. A re-release of the bunkobon edition featuring illustrations by Noizi Ito was released under the imprint Sneaker Bunko on March 1, 2012. A spin-off novel titled Another: Episode S was released on July 31, 2013. Episode S is a side novel set in the same time period, an adventure of Mei Misaki during summer vacation. Yen Press has licensed the novels in North America, and released Another in 2013 digitally, and in October 2014 in print. Yen Press's release of Episode S was compiled with the manga Another 0 and titled Another: Episode S/0. It was released in May 2016. The English translation is by Karen McGillicuddy.

A sequel, titled Another 2001, was serialized in Yasei Jidai magazine from the November 2014 issue to the February 2020 issue, and as its name implies, takes place in 2001. A compiled volume was released on September 30, 2020. Yen Press also licensed the sequel novel and released it on December 13, 2022, translated by Nicole Wilder.

=== Manga ===
A manga adaptation illustrated by Hiro Kiyohara was serialized between the May 2010 and January 2012 issues of Kadokawa Shoten's Young Ace magazine. Four tankōbon volumes were released between October 4, 2010, and December 29, 2011. A "0th" volume of the manga was released on May 26, 2012, compiling two extra chapters published in Young Ace on December 28, 2011, and February 3, 2012. Another 0 is set during Aunt Reiko's year in class 3-3, in 1983. Yen Press has licensed the original four-volume manga in North America and released it as an omnibus. The license and release of Another 0 was compiled into the novel Another: Episode S/0.

=== Anime ===
A 12-episode anime television series adaptation produced by P.A. Works and directed by Tsutomu Mizushima aired in Japan between January 10 and March 27, 2012. The screenplay was written by Ryō Higaki, and the chief animation director Yuriko Ishii based the character design used in the anime on Noizi Ito's original concept art. The music was produced by Kow Otani, and the sound director is Yoshikazu Iwanami. The anime has two theme songs: the opening theme "Kyōmu Densen" (凶夢伝染; "Nightmare Contagion") by the band Ali Project, and the ending theme "Anamnesis" by Annabel. Sentai Filmworks licensed the series in North America, releasing it on BD/DVD on July 30, 2013. An original video animation (OVA) episode set before the beginning of the series was released on May 26, 2012, with a "0th" volume of the manga. MVM Films released the series, including the OVA, in the United Kingdom and Ireland on November 25, 2013.

=== Live-action film ===
A live-action film adaptation of the same name, directed by Takeshi Furusawa and produced by Kadokawa Pictures was released in Japanese theaters on August 4, 2012. The theme song is "Rakuen" (楽園; "Paradise") by Miliyah Kato.

== Reception ==
On June 12, 2015, the now-defunct Chinese Ministry of Culture listed Another among 38 anime and manga titles banned in China.

=== Novel ===
The novel ranked third in both the 2010 Honkaku Mystery Best 10 and the Kono Mystery ga Sugoi! 2010 mystery fiction guide books. It was nominated for the 2010 Honkaku Mystery Award.

=== Anime ===
Writing in the third edition of The Anime Encyclopedia (2015), Jonathan Clements and Helen McCarthy praised Another as a faithful adaptation of Yukito Ayatsuji's novel, describing it as "one of very few anime to genuinely induce goosebumps, even in jaded anime encyclopedists". They highlighted its use of Japanese school ghost stories, urban legends and cultural conventions concerning the avoidance of unpleasant subjects. They identified parallels with the Ring, Final Destination and The Omen film franchises. They also praised the series for emphasizing the proximity of tragedy to the everyday lives of its teenage protagonists. Comparing its 1990s setting to that of Higurashi When They Cry, they observed that the absence of mobile phones and readily accessible online information helped sustain the mystery by precluding straightforward solutions to the characters' predicament.

== Editions ==
Novel

- Ayatsuji, Yukito (2009). Another. Japan. ISBN 978-4-04-874003-6.

Another manga volumes story by Yukito Ayatsuji, art by Hiro Kiyohara. Original Japanese version published by Kadokawa Shoten. English version by Yen Press.

1. Vol. 1 (ch. 1–4): 綾辻行人 (September 30, 2010). Another 1 (in Japanese). 角川書店. ISBN 978-4-04-715534-3.
2. Vol. 2 (ch. 5–9.5): 綾辻行人 (March 2, 2011). Another 2 (in Japanese). 角川書店. ISBN 978-4-04-715628-9.
3. Vol. 3 (ch. 10–14): 綾辻行人 (September 1, 2011). Another 3 (in Japanese). 角川書店. ISBN 978-4-04-715772-9.
4. Vol. 4 (ch. 15–20): 綾辻行人 (December 27, 2011). Another 4 (in Japanese). 角川書店. ISBN 978-4-04-120044-5.
- 清原紘; 綾辻行人 (May 26, 2012). Another 0 (in Japanese). 角川書店. ISBN 978-4-04-900816-6.
- Another (Omnibus edition). October 29, 2013. ISBN 978-0-316-24591-3.
