= Clover (Toriko Chiya manga) =

Japanese manga series

- Seventh tankōbon volume cover

クローバー (Kurōbā)
- Genre: Romance, slice of life
- Manga
- Written by: Toriko Chiya
- Published by: Shueisha
- Magazine: Bouquet (1997–2000); Cookie (2000–2006); Chorus (2006–2010)
- Original run: 1997 – 2010
- Volumes: 24
- Manga

Clover Trèfle
- Written by: Toriko Chiya
- Published by: Shueisha
- Magazine: Cocohana
- Original run: June 28, 2012 – November 28, 2019
- Volumes: 10
- Live-action film
- Clover (2014 film)

Clover (Japanese: クローバー, Hepburn: Kurōbā) is a Japanese manga series written and illustrated by Toriko Chiya. It follows Saya Suzuki, an office lady, who falls in love with her supervisor Susumu Tsuge.

== Plot ==
Saya Suzuki works as an office employee at Hotel Tōyō. Clumsy and inexperienced in romance, she is often scolded by her strict but capable superior, Susumu Tsuge. Despite his severity, Tsuge suddenly asks her to begin a relationship with him. Saya is still haunted by her middle school first love, Haruki Hino, but gradually enters into a relationship with Tsuge, who supports her as she learns to date again.

Around her, her colleagues also navigate turbulent relationships. Kazuyo Yagami, an older coworker, separates from her lover and later marries another colleague, only to divorce after his infidelity. Ririka Matsuzawa uses family connections to enter the company and pursues men for status, eventually leaving her job to follow a married lover abroad, becoming a single mother after he refuses divorce.

Saya's own life grows more complicated when Haruki, now a popular actor, reappears. Though she maintains her feelings for Tsuge, she struggles with her unresolved attachment to Haruki. Tsuge, meanwhile, faces pressure to marry Shiori, the daughter of an influential family. Rivalries, jealousy, and workplace gossip intensify as Saya tries to balance loyalty to Tsuge with her enduring bond with Haruki.

== Release ==
Clover was first serialized in Shueisha's magazine Bouquet between 1997 and 2000. It was transferred to Cookie, being published from 2000 to 2006 on it. In 2006, another Shueisha magazine, Chorus (now Cocohana), began serializing the manga; it lasted until April 2010. All 91 individual chapters were collected by Shueisha into 24 tankōbon volumes, published between July 25, 1997, and January 25, 2011. From November 18, 2008, to August 17, 2012, the series was republished in 13 bunkoban volumes.

The manga, which sold over 9.2 million copies in Japan, has also been published in Italy by Star Comics, in South Korea by Haksan, and in Taiwan by Sharp Point Press. It has spawned a sequel series, Clover Trèfle (クローバー trefle(トレフル), Kurōbā Torefuru), which started to be published on June 28, 2012, in Cocohana. Its first tankōbon volume was released on January 25, 2014, and, as of December 25, 2019, ten volumes of Clover Trèfle have been released in Japan. Clover Trèfle was licensed in South Korea by Haksan. Related works Little Clover (リトル・クローバー, Ritoru kurōbā) and Green Green Green were released into a single volume on October 17, 2014.

== Adaptations ==
An audio drama CD was published by Shueisha on May 18, 2004.

A film directed by Takeshi Furusawa and written by Taeko Asano was released on November 1, 2014.
