= Young You =

Japanese manga magazine

- Categories: Josei manga
- First issue: 1986
- Final issue Number: October 2005; 5
- Company: Shueisha
- Country: Japan
- Based in: Tokyo
- Language: Japanese
- Website: Official website (archived)

Young You (Japanese: ヤングユー, Hepburn: Yangu Yū) was a Japanese josei manga magazine published by Shueisha, based in Tokyo and first published in 1986. It ran for 22 years before being cancelled in October 2005. After the magazine's closure, Shueisha moved several series serialized in Young You to its sister magazines Chorus (now known as Cocohana) and You.

== Notable mangakas and series serialized in Young You ==
- Naomi Akimoto
  - Ensemble
  - Katei no Jijou
  - Natural
  - See You Again
  - Uchi no Mama ga Iu Koto ni wa
  - Ushirosugata no Cha Cha
  - Yoru no Kumo Asa no Tsuki
- Nanae Haruno
  - Double House
  - Papa Told Me
  - Pietà
- Yukari Ichijo
  - Tadashii Renai no Susume
- Mariko Iwadate
  - Amaryllis
  - Alice ni Onegai
  - Bara no Hoo
  - Kirara no Ki
  - Reizouko ni Pineapple Pie
- Maki Kusumoto
  - Tanbi Seikatsu Hyakka
- Erica Sakurazawa
  - Love Vibes
- Shungicu Uchida
  - Kaiketsu wa Shimasen
- Chika Umino
  - Honey and Clover
- Ebine Yamaji
  - Mahoko
  - Otenki to Issho
- Mayumi Yoshida
  - Kushami San Kai
