= Yoshimi Uchida =

Japanese manga artist

- 内田 善美
- Born: October 28, 1953 (age 73); Yamanashi Prefecture, Honshu, Japan
- Occupation: Manga artist
- Years active: 1974–1986
- Notable work: Liddell of Star Clock

Yoshimi Uchida (Japanese: 内田 善美, Hepburn: Uchida Yoshimi; born October 28, 1953) is a Japanese manga artist. She is well-known for her detailed and emotional art style. Her career ended in 1986 after publishing her last long work, Liddell of Star Clock (three volumes). None of her works have been republished in accordance with her wishes. Representative works of hers include Liddell of Star Clock and Sō Labyrinth, Sō Space.

== Life and works ==
Uchida was born in Yamanashi Prefecture in 1953. The first manga she read was 8 Man by Jiro Kuwata. In middle school, she started drawing manga herself. Uchida started her professional career in 1974 when she was still a student in the university. She won the Ribon Award, which is the highest rank prize for a newcomer in the manga magazine Ribon, with her short manga story In the Season of Violet Color (すみれ色の季節に). She then published her debut story Nami no Shōgaibutsu Lace (なみの障害物レース) in Ribon. Until she graduated university, Uchida worked as an assistant for Yukari Ichijo. Through 1977, she published exclusively in Ribon magazine and its sister magazines.

In 1977, she quit her contract with Ribon and became a freelancer. She published illustrations in magazines such as Lyrica and worked also as a book designer for a publisher.

When in 1978, Shueisha founded the new shōjo magazine Bouquet, she published her work in it from the first issue until around 1983. She was one of the main contributors of the magazine besides Sakumi Yoshino, Akemi Matsunae and Wakako MIzuki. In this magazine, she published her only long series and most famous work, Liddell of Star Clock. The series was published from 1982 until 1983, first in chapters in the magazine, then in three volumes.

In 1984, Uchida published her last short story. She published a few more illustrations in the late 1980s, but then ended her career and has lived withdrawn from the public. Her books are difficult to get ahold of in Japanese, as Uchida wishes for her works not to be republished, although they have been licensed in other countries. In 2013, fellow manga artist and friend of Uchida's, Akemi Matsunae, said that she was doing well at home, and Uchida allowed for some of her illustrations to be published in the February 2014 edition of the art magazine Geijutsu Shinchō on Pre-Raphaelite art and its influences.

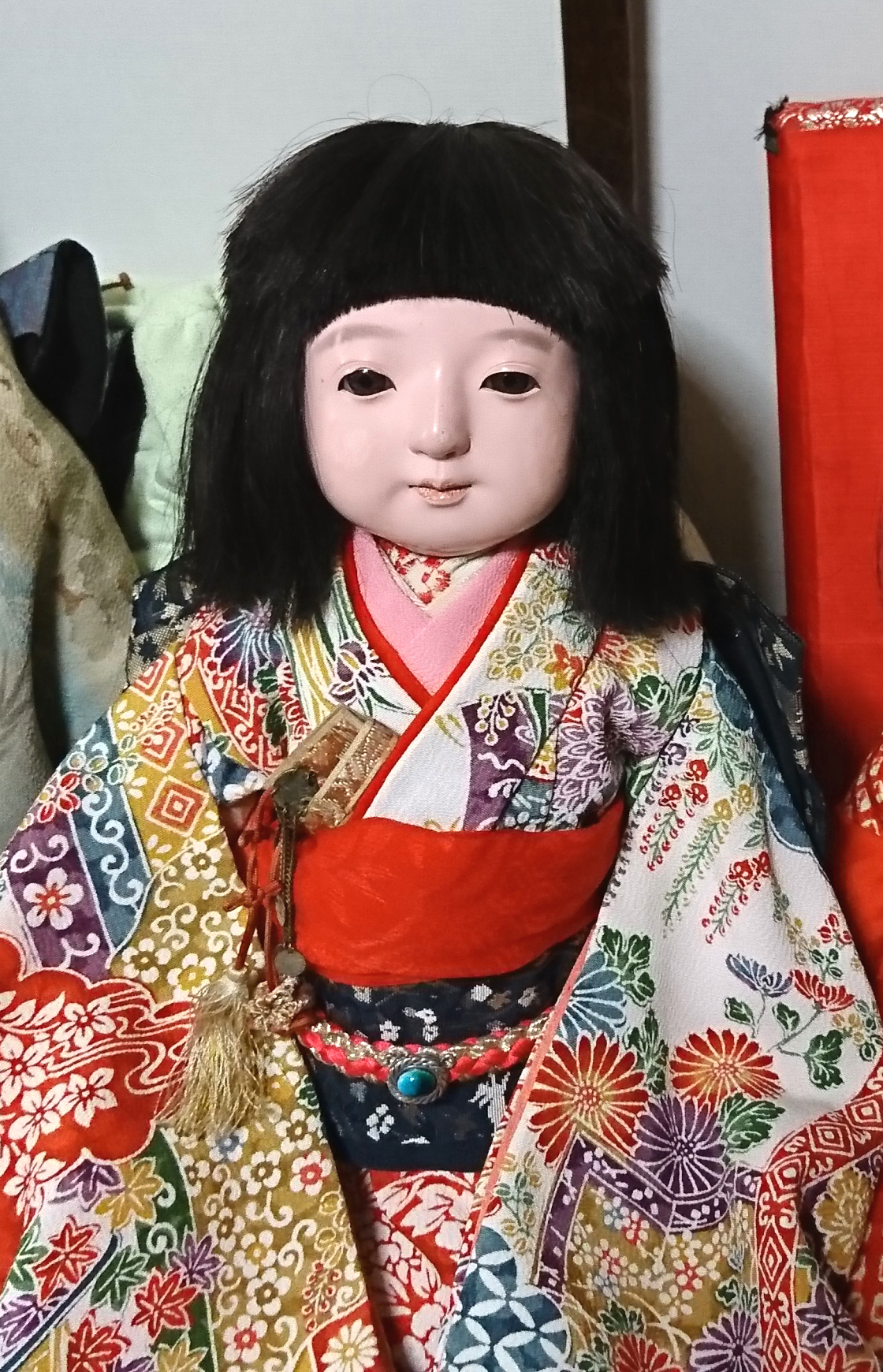
Neko is an ichimatsu ningyō

=== Sō Labyrinth, Sō Space ===
A college student named Sō (草), who finds Neko (ねこ, literally "cat"), an ichimatsu ningyō who talks, walks, moves, and eats as if she is a real human girl. The two of them live and grow together.

=== Liddell of Star Clock ===
A young American man named Hugh has recurring dreams of a house he has never visited and a young Victorian girl named Liddell who calls him a ghost.

== List of selected works ==
=== Manga tankobon ===
- The Ship of Star Dust Color (星くず色の船), 1977-05, Ribon mascot comics, Shueisha
- Pianissimo at the End of Fall (秋のおわりのピアニシモ), 1978-08, Ribon mascot comics, Shueisha
- Looks Like the Color of the Sky (空の色ににている), 1981-05, Bouquet comics, Shueisha
- Steam Train Swaying in Gypsophila (かすみ草にゆれる汽車), 1981-10, Bouquet comics, Shueisha
- Forest of Clear-toned Cicada (ひぐらしの森, 1980-10-20, Bouquet comics, Shueisha
- Sō Labyrinth, Sō Space (草迷宮・草空間), 1985-03, Shueisha
- Liddell of Star Clock (星の時計のLiddell), (3 volumes) 1985-09 to 1986-10, Shueisha

=== Artbook ===
- Magic Spell of St. Pumpkin (聖パンプキンの呪文), 1978-10, Shinshokan
- Visions of Snow White (白雪姫幻想), 1979-09, Sanrio
- Uchida Yoshimi Artbook - Memories of the Boys (内田善美自選複製原画集 少年たちの記憶) (Artist selection), 1979-12, Cherish gallery, Hakusensha
- Somnium Night Flight Record (ソムニウム夜間飛行記), 1982-10, Hakusensha

=== Illustration ===
- The cover of I Love Galesburg in the Springtime (short story collection) by Jack Finney, 1980, Hayakawa Publishing, translation (in Japanese)

=== Publication outside of Japan ===
The series Liddell of Star Clock was translated into French as Liddell au clair de Lune by Black Box. It has also been licensed in English by Glacier Bay Books.

== Award ==
- Ribon Prize, 1974 (Comic magazine Ribon)

== Style ==
Uchida was influenced by other shōjo manga artists as well as by European paintings, in particular the Pre-Raphaelite Brotherhood and Edward Burne-Jones.
