= Nanae Haruno =

Japanese manga artist

Nanae Haruno (榛野なな恵, Haruno Nanae; born in Fukushima, Japan) is a Japanese josei manga artist.

== Career ==
She made her professional debut in 1979 with Kyupiido Beibi ("Cupid Baby") in Seventeen. She was a steady writer for Young You magazine, until the magazine stopped publication. She is best known for her long-running series Papa Told Me about the daily life of a young girl and her widower father, for which she received the 1990 Shogakukan Manga Award for shōjo. Some of Haruno's 1990s manga, such as Pietà and Double House, have explored lesbian and transgender themes.

== Works ==
Title	Year	Notes	Refs
Cupid Baby (キューピッド・ベイビー)	1979	one-shot published in Seventeen	
Green Romance (グリーンロマンス)	1984–1985	serialized in Seventeen	
Papa Told Me	since 1987	serialized in Young You and Cocohana (formerly Chorus)	
Double House (ダブルハウス)	1996–1997	serialized in Young You and Bessatsu Young You	
Pietà (ピエタ)	1998–1999	serialized in Young You	
Panteon (パンテオン)	2002–2004	serialized in Young You	
Chimneys kan no himitsu (チムニーズ館の秘密)	2006	serialized in Chorus based on Agatha Christie	
