= Akiko Higashimura =

Japanese manga artist

Akiko Higashimura 東村 アキコ
- Born: October 15, 1975 (age 51) Kushima, Miyazaki, Japan
- Areas: Manga artist, writer
- Notable works: Princess Jellyfish; Blank Canvas: My So-Called Artist's Journey; Tokyo Tarareba Girls

Akiko Higashimura (Japanese: 東村 アキコ, Hepburn: Higashimura Akiko; born October 15, 1975) is a Japanese manga artist.

== Life and career ==
Higashimura was born in 1975 in Kushima in Miyazaki Prefecture. During her childhood, she moved frequently due to her father's job, relocating five times during elementary school and twice during junior high. From a young age, she enjoyed drawing and was supported by her parents in her artistic interests. Influenced broadly by shōjo manga of the 1980s, she aspired to become a manga artist from early on, though she did not pursue this dream professionally until adulthood.

She debuted as a professional manga artist in the now-defunct manga magazine Bouquet Deluxe in 1999 with the short story "Fruits Kōmori" (フルーツコウモリ). Her first serialized work was Kisekae Yuka-chan (2001), published in the shōjo magazine Cookie. The series centered around a fashion-loving sixth-grade girl, a choice Higashimura made due to her initial discomfort with writing romance, despite it being a hallmark of the shōjo genre.

One of her breakout hits was Mama wa Tenparist, an autobiographical child-rearing manga that began in 2007 in the josei magazine Chorus. The series documents her life with her toddler son and became an unexpected hit, selling over one million copies.

In 2006, she began serializing Himawari: Kenichi Legend in the seinen magazine Morning, marking her foray into male-targeted publications and launching a dual-career track in both shōjo/josei and seinen magazines. Among her best-known works are Princess Jellyfish, Tokyo Tarareba Girls, and Blank Canvas: My So-Called Artist's Journey.

She lives in Harajuku, Tokyo. Higashimura's younger brother, Takuma Morishige, is the author of the manga My Neighbor Seki.

== Style and themes ==
=== Working method ===
Higashimura is renowned for her extraordinary productivity. Since the mid-2000s, she has consistently maintained multiple serializations at once, producing roughly 100 pages of manga every month for over a decade. At one point in 2007, she was working on three episodes of Himawari, one of Kisekae Yuka-chan, three of Mama wa Tenparist, two one-shots, and various smaller assignments in a single summer.

Her productivity is supported by an unusually large team of assistants, up to 36 at any given time, whom she manages via the Line messaging app. She credits this teamwork with allowing her to avoid creative fatigue and missed deadlines, stating that she often draws motivation from the reactions of her assistants even before considering the readers' reception.

=== Themes ===
Higashimura is known for combining fashion, humor, and understated romance in her work, a style that developed with editorial encouragement early in her career. While she continues to write shōjo manga, she admits to still finding it difficult to write "heavy romance" and prefers to approach romantic elements with humor or from unconventional angles.

== Reception ==
Several of her manga are critically acclaimed. Higashimura was nominated for the Manga Taishō in 2008 for Himawari: Kenichi Legend, in 2009 for Mama wa Tenparist, in 2010 for Princess Jellyfish, in 2011 for Omo ni Naitemasu, and in 2016 and 2017 for Tokyo Tarareba Girls. In 2010, she won the 34th Kodansha Manga Award for Best Shōjo Manga for Princess Jellyfish. In 2015, she won both the 8th Manga Taishō and the Grand Prize at the 19th Japan Media Arts Festival for Blank Canvas: My So-Called Artist's Journey. In 2019, she won the Eisner Award for Best U.S. Edition of International Material—Asia for Tokyo Tarareba Girls.

== Works ==
- "Fruits Kōmori" (フルーツコウモリ) (1999)
- Kisekae Yuka-chan (きせかえユカちゃん) (2001–present, Shueisha) (Note: Kisekae Yuka-chan premiered in the January 2001 issue of Shueisha's Cookie magazine. Its serialization was suspended for four years following the publication of the July 2008 issue. Higashimura returned with a new chapter in the July 2012 issue on May 26, 2012; the chapter's final page stated that Kisekae Yuka-chan would continue, despite a previous report that the 2012 chapter would probably be the series finale.)
- Himawari: Kenichi Legend (ひまわりっ 健一レジェンド) (2006–2010, Kodansha)
- Mama wa Tenparist (ママはテンパリスト) (2007–2011, Shueisha)
- Princess Jellyfish (海月姫) (2008–2017, Kodansha)
- Omo ni Naitemasu (主に泣いてます) (2010–2012, Kodansha)
- Blank Canvas: My So-Called Artist's Journey (かくかくしかじか) (2011–2015, Shueisha)
- Meropon Dashi! (メロポンだし！) (2013–2014, Kodansha)
- Tokyo Tarareba Girls (東京タラレバ娘) (2014–2017, Kodansha)
- Bishoku Tantei Akechi Gorō (美食探偵 明智五郎) (2015–present, Shueisha)
- Himoxile (ヒモザイル) (2015, Kodansha, suspended)
- Yukibana no Tora (雪花の虎) (2015–2020, Shogakukan)
- A Fake Affair (偽装不倫, Gisō Furin) (2017–2019, Bungeishunjū)
- Tokyo Tarareba Girls Extra Edition: Tarare-Bar (東京タラレバ娘番外編 タラレBar) (2017–2018, Kodansha)
- Hypermedy Nakajima Haruko (ハイパーミディ中島ハルコ) (2018–2021, with Mariko Hayashi, Shueisha)
- Tokyo Tarareba Girls Returns (東京タラレバ娘 リターンズ) (2018, Kodansha)
- Tokyo Tarareba Girls Season 2 (東京タラレバ娘 シーズン2) (2019–2021, Kodansha)
- Bara to Tulip (薔薇とチューリップ) (2019, Shogakukan)
- Watashi no Koto o Oboeteimasu ka? (私のことを憶えていますか) (2020–present, Piccoma)
