= Clover (2014 film) =

- Film poster
- Directed by: Takeshi Furusawa
- Written by: Taeko Asano
- Based on: Clover by Toriko Chiya
- Produced by: Akiko Ikuno; Tamako Tsujimoto; Yoshiyuki Watanabe
- Starring: Emi Takei; Tadayoshi Okura; Kento Nagayama; Natsuna; Haruka Kinami
- Cinematography: Mitsuru Komiyama
- Edited by: Hidemi Li
- Production company: Clover Production Committee
- Distributed by: Toho
- Release date: November 1, 2014
- Running time: 120 minutes
- Country: Japan
- Language: Japanese

Clover (クローバー) is a 2014 Japanese romantic drama film directed by Takeshi Furusawa and based on the manga series created by Toriko Chiya.

== Plot ==
Saya Suzuki, a hotel employee, works at Hotel Toyo under her supervisor, Susumu Tsuge. Saya is dimwitted, and often commits mistakes and gets scolded by Tsuge. Out of blue, Tsuge asks her out and Saya is taken aback. Reluctantly, she agrees to go out. During the date, she tells him about her past with famous singer and aspiring theatre artist, Haruki Hino. In school days, she and Haruki were in love and eloped until they were found by cops. Both she and Haruki believe that when they find a four leaf clover then they have found the one. Soon after failed elopement, Haruki is sent to America and Suzuki is heartbroken. Now, Haruki has returned as a teen icon. Tsuge suggests that he'll be her rehabilitation until she can love again. Once organizing an event, Saya and Haruki meet again and become friends. Tsuge is a proud, well educated and career oriented person. So when an offer for work at Hotel's foreign branch comes, he agrees. Due to which there are rumors about him and Hotel owner's daughter, Shiori which keeps Saya insecure. During a six month work trip of Tsuge, he becomes more distant and less reciprocating to Saya. Saya and Huruki become more close friends. Upon returning, Shiori gets engaged to Tsuge. Also, photos of Saya and Haruki are published. When Saya confronts Tsuge of engagement and being close with Shiori, he doubts about her relationship with Haruki. And Saya and Tsuge end their relationship, which leads Haruki to make a move on Saya, by rekindling childhood memories of elopement. But, Saya chooses Tsuge. Meanwhile, Shiori drugs Tsuge to spend the night together and blackmails him to marry her. Also their engagement is announced by Shiori and a party is planned. A heartbroken Saya also attends the party and is given the task of giving flower bouquet to the engaged couple which she drops to find a four leaf clover. Annoyed by her luck, she enters the party hall only to find Tsuge declaring his love for her in front of everyone. Later, it is revealed that Tsuge loses his pride and becomes submissive to Shiori which bores her. The hotel CEO is moved by Tsuge's outburst for Saya and lets him keep his job. Due to their section chief, Saya loses her clover and finds it under a table when Tsuge also reaches for it symbolizing that she has found her one. In post credit, it is shown that Saya and Tsuge get married.

== Cast ==
- Emi Takei as Saya Suzuki
- Tadayoshi Okura as Susumu Tsuge
- Kento Nagayama as Haruki Hino
- Natsuna as Shiori Tsutsui
- Haruka Kinami as Kazuyo Yagami
- Yasuko Mitsūra as Sakurako Kisaragi
- Kenji Murakami as Mitsunari Gōda
- Rie Shibata as fortune-teller
- Masahiko Nishimura as Section Chief Matsushita

== Development ==
Clover was first announced on 3 March 2014, and the first image from the film was released in the Chūnichi Sport newspaper.

The theme song for the film, titled "CloveR", was provided by Kanjani Eight. JUJU also provided songs for the film.

The first trailer was released on 29 August 2014, and the film was released in Japan on November 1, 2014.

== Reception ==
Clover grossed $5,438,177 at the Japanese box office.
