= Pink Candy Kiss =

Japanese manga series

- First tankōbon volume cover

冷たくて 柔らか (Tsumetakute Yawaraka)
- Genre: Drama; Romance; Yuri
- Manga
- Written by: Ami Uozumi
- Published by: Shueisha
- English publisher: NA: Viz Media
- Imprint: Margaret Comics
- Magazine: Cocohana
- Original run: November 28, 2022 – present
- Volumes: 7

Pink Candy Kiss (Japanese: 冷たくて 柔らか, Hepburn: Tsumetakute Yawaraka) is a Japanese yuri manga series written and illustrated by Ami Uozumi. It has been serialized in Shueisha's josei manga magazine Cocohana since November 2022, and is licensed for an English-language release by Viz Media under its Shojo Beat imprint.

== Synopsis ==
Takara Itozaki, an estate agent living in Tokyo, finds herself adrift after her boyfriend suddenly breaks up with her. Despite her plans for the future now being thrown to the wayside, Takara isn't particularly upset about the breakup, nor has she been upset with any her past breakups. As she considers what about her past relationships might have caused this a beautiful woman visits the real estate agency where she works. After speaking for a while, Takara realizes that the woman is Emma, a classmate who transferred to a new school in her second year of junior high school, and whom she had once tried to kiss.

== Publication ==
Written and illustrated by Ami Uozumi, Pink Candy Kiss began serialization in Shueisha's josei manga magazine Cocohana on November 28, 2022. The series has been collected into seven tankōbon volumes as of June 25, 2026.

The series is licensed for an English release in North America by Viz Media under its Shojo Beat imprint.

No.	Original release date	Original ISBN	English release date	English ISBN
1	June 23, 2023	978-4-08-844783-4	April 1, 2025	978-1-9747-5167-9
2	December 25, 2023	978-4-08-844827-5	July 1, 2025	978-1-9747-5591-2
3	June 25, 2024	978-4-08-843023-2	October 7, 2025	978-1-9747-5862-3
4	December 24, 2024	978-4-08-843080-5	January 6, 2026	978-1-9747-6189-0
5	June 25, 2025	978-4-08-843150-5	June 2, 2026	978-1-9747-6567-6
6	December 24, 2025	978-4-08-843219-9	December 1, 2026	978-1-9747-6905-6
7	June 25, 2026	978-4-08-843275-5	—	—

== Reception ==
Pink Candy Kiss placed 12th in the 2024 edition of Takarajimasha's Kono Manga ga Sugoi! guidebook's list of the best manga for female readers.
