= Genji Monogatari (manga) =

Japanese manga series

- The cover of the first volume of Genji Monogatari

源氏物語
- Manga
- Written by: Miyako Maki
- Published by: Shogakukan
- Original run: 1988 – 1990
- Volumes: 6

Genji Monogatari (源氏物語) is a Japanese manga version of Murasaki Shikibu's The Tale of Genji by Miyako Maki. In 1989, it received the 34th Shogakukan Manga Award for general manga.

== Publication ==
| No. | Japanese release date | Japanese ISBN |
|---|---|---|
| 1 | November 17, 1997 | 978-4-09-191211-4 |
| 2 | January 17, 1998 | 978-4-09-191212-1 |
| 3 | January 17, 1998 | 978-4-09-191213-8 |
| 4 | February 17, 1998 | 978-4-09-191214-5 |
| 5 | February 17, 1998 | 978-4-09-191215-2 |
| 6 | April 17, 1998 | 978-4-09-191216-9 |

== See also ==
- List of characters from The Tale of Genji
- The Tale of Genji - Waki Yamato's 1980–1993 manga adaptation of the tale.
