= Yukibana no Tora =

Manga series by Akiko Higashimura

- Cover of the first volume

雪花の虎
- Genre: Historical
- Manga
- Written by: Akiko Higashimura
- Published by: Shogakukan
- Imprint: Big Comics
- Magazine: Hibana (2015– 2017); Weekly Big Comic Spirits (2018–2020)
- Original run: March 6, 2015 – October 26, 2020
- Volumes: 10
- icon

Yukibana no Tora (雪花の虎; lit. 'Snowflake Tiger') is a Japanese manga series written and illustrated by Akiko Higashimura. It is the story of Uesugi Kenshin, and tackles a theory that the historical figure was a woman. It was serialized in Shogakukan's seinen manga magazine Hibana from March 2015 to August 2017, when the manga ceased its publication, and it was then serialized in Weekly Big Comic Spirits from January 2018 to October 2020. Its chapters were collected in ten tankōbon volumes.

== Publication ==
Yukibana no Tora, written and illustrated by Akiko Higashimura, tells the story of Uesugi Kenshin, and tackles a theory that the historical figure was a woman. The manga was serialized Shogakukan's seinen manga magazine Hibana from March 6, 2015, to August 7, 2017, when the magazine ceased its publication. Originally, it was planned that the manga would be transferred to Monthly Big Comic Spirits, however, it was later reported that it would be moved to Weekly Big Comic Spirits, starting on January 15, 2018. The series finished on October 26, 2020. Shogakukan collected its chapters into ten individual tankōbon volumes, released from September 11, 2015, to February 12, 2021.

The manga is licensed in France by Le Lézard noir.

=== Volumes ===
No.	Japanese release date	Japanese ISBN
1	September 11, 2015	978-4-09-187188-6
2	February 12, 2016	978-4-09-187565-5
3	September 12, 2016	978-4-09-187565-5
4	January 12, 2017	978-4-09-189444-1
5	November 10, 2017	978-4-09-189752-7
6	August 9, 2018	978-4-09-860103-5
7	March 12, 2019	978-4-09-860276-6
8	September 12, 2019	978-4-09-860435-7
9	April 10, 2020	978-4-09-860660-3
10	February 12, 2021	978-4-09-861006-8

== Reception ==
Yukibana no Tora ranked 14th on the "Nationwide Bookstore Employees' Recommended Comics" by the Honya Club website in 2016. In November 2019, the manga was nominated at the 47th Angoulême International Comics Festival for the Best Young Adult Comic Award.
