= Ghost Train (2006 film) =

- Directed by: Takeshi Furusawa
- Written by: Takeshi Furusawa; Erika Tanaka
- Starring: Erika Sawajiri; Shun Oguri; Aya Sugimoto
- Distributed by: Shochiku (Japan); CJ Entertainment (South Korea)
- Release dates: July 27, 2006 (South Korea); September 30, 2006 (Japan)
- Running time: 92 minutes
- Country: Japan
- Language: Japanese

Ghost Train (オトシモノ, otoshimono) is a Japanese horror film released in 2006. It was the first Japanese film that was released in Korea before Japan.

== Plot ==
A young boy, Takeshi, is told by a mysterious woman that he will die after picking up a ticket inside a red bag. While boarding the subway train home, he is pulled outside of the train, which briefly stops when the conductor is distracted by a figure outside. The next day, Takeshi's classmate, Noriko Kimura, finds the ticket and shows it to her sister, Nana, experiencing a vision of a baby and her mother in the process. Noriko spots Takeshi while waiting for the train and tries to follow him, but she ends up missing as well.

Nana decides to take action and contacts the train conductor, Shunichi Kuga. From the name written on the ticket, Yaeko Aonuma, she learns that the ticket has been returned to the lost-and-found multiple times. The people who returned it, have all died. The victims all have two distinguishing features: black marks covering their face and black eyes. Nana visits Takeshi's apartment, but flees when she sees that Takeshi has returned. Takeshi appears naked and pale. He has dark marks on his face and dark eyes, with his mother repeatedly babbling that he is no longer Takeshi.

Nana's classmate, Kanae Fujita, receives a bracelet from her boyfriend that turns out to be a useless trinket. When she confronts her boyfriend at the subway station that night, he is possessed and chokes her. Kanae kicks him to the railway right, when the spirit leaves him and a train appears. Before he dies, he tells her to "beware of Yaeko". When Kanae visits the station again, Yaeko's spirit chases her until she bumps into Nana. Deciding to tackle the mystery together, the two agree to meet at the station the next day, but Nana unexpectedly has to attend her sick mother at the hospital. Alone at the station, Kanae is almost hit by a train. A mysterious hand saves her at the last second.

Nana demands more information about Yaeko from Kuga, who reveals that Yaeko is a pregnant woman who gave birth to her baby right after she was hit by a train. She died, but the status of the baby is unknown. Kanae wakes up to the woman who had rescued her. The woman tells her that she wants revenge against Yaeko, as her son suffered the same fate as Takeshi. The woman agrees to drive Kanae to the station. Along the way, the car is hijacked by Yaeko and stops right in the middle of a railway. The woman manages to escape, but Kanae is not so lucky. She asks the woman to save Nana, before a train hits the car.

At the station, the woman informs Nana about Kanae's fate. With Kuga's help, the trio head to a deeper part of the subway. Nana receives another vision, learning that there was already a spirit who resided in the subway and that Yaeko was just another victim. However, her sorrowful spirit, furious at not knowing her baby's fate, overcomes the original spirit. She then becomes the sole haunter of the subway.

Unraveling a passageway behind the tunnel walls, Nana and the woman discover the spirit's ancient statues and Noriko sleeping atop a mountain of dead bodies. When Yaeko appears, the woman is enraged and tackles her, ending up stabbed by a stalagmite. As she lays dying, Nana learns from the woman's scars that she is Yaeko's long-lost baby. Seeing the bodies reanimated, Nana and Noriko race back to Kuga's train. Nana almost falls to an endless chasm, but is pulled back by her sister, Kuga, and Kanae's spirit. Upon reaching the train, Kuga manages to steer the train back to the station.

The next day, Nana and Noriko visit their mother, who has recovered and is ready to come back home. Nana watches the TV and learns that Kuga has ordered an explosion on the subway to seal it forever. She heads outside to sit on a bench and meets Kanae's spirit. The two smile at each other, before Kanae disappears.

== Cast ==
Character	Japanese actor	English voice
Nana Kimura	Erika Sawajiri	Colleen Clinkenbeard
Kanae Fujita	Chinatsu Wakatsuki	Serena Varghese
Shunichi Kuga	Shun Oguri	Kalob Martinez
Yaeko Aonuma	Aya Sugimoto	Christine Auten
Kawamura	Itsuji Itao	Jason Douglas

== Production ==
The story references an event that occurred in Mizunashi during 1971, in which a lady called Yaeko Aonuma was killed in a train accident. The director took 2 years to create the plot of the film and develop it with his editor.

In the film, while Nana Kimura is browsing a book, the fictional Miskatonic University of the Cthulhu Mythos is featured on one of its pages.

== Release ==
The film was first released on July 27, 2006, in South Korea, and then on September 30, 2006, in Japan. The film was subsequently released in Taiwan on November 17, 2006, and Hong Kong on November 23, 2006. ADV licensed Ghost Train and Synesthesia effective 2006/10/24 for $58,668; in July 2007, ADV Films released an English localization dub of the film on DVD. In 2008, The film, along with over 30 other titles from ADV was transferred over to Funimation Entertainment, which then re-released it in 2009.

== Adaptations ==
A novel and comic adaptation saw publication in the same year, with the publishing of the works handled by the Kadokawa Shoten.
