= Mariko Iwadate =

Japanese shōjo manga artist (born 1957)

Mariko Iwadate (岩館真理子, Iwadate Mariko; born 8 February 1957 in Sapporo, Hokkaidō, Japan) is a Japanese manga artist.

== Career ==
She made her debut as a manga artist in 1973 with the short story "Rakudai Shimasu" in the shōjo manga magazine Margaret. She then primarily wrote for the magazines Margaret and Young You.

== Style ==
She is considered one of the main artists of a movement in 1970s shōjo manga called otomechikku, alongside Ako Mutsu, Yumiko Tabuchi and Hideko Tachikake. Narratives in this movement focused more on everyday life situations, romances and psychological growth of Japanese high schools girls as opposed to the narratives of the Year 24 Group, which experimented with fantasy, science fiction and boys love often in international settings. Rachel Thorn describes that otomechikku manga "were heavily infused with a dreamy, 1970s-style femininity characterized by frilly cotton dresses, straw sun bonnets, herbal tea, and Victorian houses." Masanao Amano describes these early works as "stereotypical shoujo manga stories that were of very good quality".

By the 1980s, her works started exploring deeper themes. The short story "Angel", published in 1982, is marked as a stylistic turning point. In the story, the main character has an arranged marriage and ends up falling in love with her husband. Many of her manga focus on family relationships.

Natsume Fusanosuke explains that Iwadate uses white space boldly to suggest emotion and experiments with panel layouts to suggest an uncertainty in the frame.

== Reception ==
Her work had an influence on writer Banana Yoshimoto. Amano describes Iwadate's work as "the combination of literature with shoujo manga".

She won the 1992 Kodansha Manga Award for shōjo for Uchi no Mama ga iu Koto ni wa, and her manga Ichigatsu ni wa Christmas ("Christmas in January") was adapted as an anime OVA in 1991.

== Works ==
Title	Year	Notes	Refs
Oshioki Shichaou kara! (おしおきしちゃうから!)	1976	Serialized in Margaret; Published by Shueisha in 1 vol.	
Hatsukoi Jidai (初恋時代)	1977	Serialized in Margaret; Published by Shueisha in 2 vol.	
Futari no Dōwa (ふたりの童話)	1977–1978	Serialized in Margaret; Published by Shueisha in 3 vol.	
Haru ga Kossori (春がこっそり)	1977	Serialized in Margaret; Published by Shueisha in 1 vol.	
Greenhouse wa Doko desu ka? (グリーンハウスはどこですか?)	1978	Serialized in Margaret; Published by Shueisha in 1 vol.	
17-Nenme (17年目)	1979	Serialized in Margaret; Published by Shueisha in 1 vol.	
Tonari no Kajin (となりの佳人)	1980	Serialized in Margaret; Published by Shueisha in 1 vol.	
Chaimu (チャイ夢)	1981	Serialized in Margaret; Published by Shueisha in 1 vol.	
4-gatsu no Niwa no Kodomotachi (4月の庭の子供たち)	1981	Serialized in Margaret; Published by Shueisha in 1 vol.	
Otomezaka Sensou (乙女坂戦争)	1982	Serialized in Margaret; Published by Shueisha in 1 vol.	
Fukurettsura no Princess (ふくれっつらのプリンセス)	1982	Serialized in Margaret; Published by Shueisha in 1 vol.	
Garasu no hanataba ni shite (ガラスの花束にして)	1981–1982	Serialized in Margaret; Published by Shueisha in 2 vol.	
Angel (えんじぇる)	1983	Serialized in Margaret; Published by Shueisha in 1 vol.	
Ichigatsu ni wa Christmas (1月にはChristmas)	1983	Serialized in Margaret; Published by Shueisha in 1 vol.	
Shinko Monogatari (森子物語)	1984	Serialized in Margaret; Published by Shueisha in 2 vol.	
Watashi ga Ningyo ni Natta Hi (わたしが人魚になった日)	1985	Serialized in Margaret; Published by Shueisha in 1 vol.	
Oishii Kankei (おいしい関係)	1986	Serialized in Margaret; Published by Shueisha in 2 vol.	
Shuumatsu no Menu (週末のメニュー)	1986	Serialized in Margaret; Published by Shueisha in 1 vol.	
Tooi Hoshi o Kazoete (遠い星をかぞえて)	1987	Serialized in Margaret; Published by Shueisha in 1 vol.	
Marude Shabon (まるでシャボン)	1987	Serialized in Margaret; Published by Shueisha in 2 vol.	
Kimi wa 3-choume no Tsuki (きみは3丁目の月)	1988	Serialized in Margaret; Published by Shueisha in 1 vol.	
Uchi no Mama ga iu koto ni wa (うちのママが言うことには)	1988–1994	Serialized in Young You; Published by Shueisha in 5 vol.	
Gobangai o Arukou (五番街を歩こう)	1989	Serialized in Margaret; Published by Shueisha in 1 vol.	
Kodomo ha nan demo shitte iru (子供はなんでも知っている)	1990–1996	Serialized in Bouquet; Published by Shueisha in 4 vol.	
Reizōko ni Pineapple Pie (冷蔵庫にパイナップル･パイ)	1990–1995	Serialized in Young You; Published by Shueisha in 3 vol.	
Alice ni Onegai (アリスにお願い)	1991	Serialized in Young You; Published by Shueisha in 1 vol.	
Kumo no Namae (雲の名前)	1993	Serialized in Young Rose; Published by Kadokawa Shoten in 1 vol.	
Shiroi Saten no Ribon (白いサテンのリボン)	1994	Serialized in Young You; Published by Shueisha in 1 vol.	
Kirara no Ki (キララのキ)	1997–1998	Serialized in Young You; Published by Shueisha in 4 vol.	
Bara no Hoo (薔薇のほお)	1999	Serialized in Young You; Published by Shueisha in 1 vol.	
Amaririsu (アマリリス)	2001–2004	Serialized in Young You; Published by Shueisha in 4 vol.	
Mada Hachigatsu no Bijutsukan (まだ八月の美術館)	2001	Serialized in Young You; Published by Shueisha in 1 vol.	
Tsuki to Kumo no Aida (月と雲の間)	2001	Serialized in Morning Shin Magnum Zōkan; Published by Kodansha in 1 vol.	
Miagete Goran (見上げてごらん)	2007	Serialized in Young You; Published by Shueisha in 1 vol.	
