= Another (film) =

- Poster

Japanese name
- Kanji: アナザー
Transcriptions
- Revised Hepburn: Anazā
- Directed by: Takeshi Furusawa
- Written by: Yukiko Tanaka; Takeshi Furusawa
- Based on: Another by Yukito Ayatsuji
- Starring: Kento Yamazaki; Ai Hashimoto; Yoshihiko Hakamada; Ai Kato
- Distributed by: Toho
- Release date: 4 August 2012
- Running time: 109 minutes
- Country: Japan
- Language: Japanese
- Box office: US$5.6 million

Another (Japanese: アナザー, Hepburn: Anazā) is a 2012 Japanese school mystery horror film directed by Takeshi Furusawa, starring Kento Yamazaki, Ai Hashimoto, Yoshihiko Hakamada and Ai Kato and based on the novel of the same name by Yukito Ayatsuji. It was released in Japan by Toho on 4 August 2012.

== Plot ==
On April 19, 1998, Koichi Sakakibara is hospitalized at Yumigaoka Hospital due to a pneumothorax episode. He stumbles upon an eyepatch-wearing girl as she boards an elevator to the hospital's abandoned basement, ignoring Koichi's attempts to communicate. Three weeks later, Koichi enters Yomiyama North Middle School as a transfer student of Class 3-3. Yomiyama is his deceased mother's childhood home, and, while his father is abroad in India, Koichi is temporarily staying there alongside his grandmother and aunt, Reiko, who is also Class 3-3's homeroom teacher. The eyepatch girl, Mei Misaki, is one of his classmates, but he is confused as others are apparently unaware of her existence. Once told about a student named Misaki who died years ago, Koichi suspects that Mei is a ghost. However, he quickly realizes that Mei is very much alive, only that her existence is ignored by the entire school.

Despite others' attempts to dissuade him from contacting Mei, Koichi continues to gather information about her, learning that beneath the eyepatch, she has a glass eye in place of her left eye. She claims that she is able to see a death aura using it, thus recognizing which people are about to die or already died. When a student is trying to stop him from talking with Mei, she suffers a fatal freak accident in which her neck becomes stabbed by the sharp end of an umbrella. Another accident occurs during Koichi's visit to Yumigaoka Hospital, in which his nurse is killed by glass impaling her head. The next day, Koichi discovers that for disobeying the rule of not talking with Mei, the entire school punishes him by also ignoring his existence. This allows Koichi to finally befriend Mei for good.

Koichi and Mei gather more information about the freak accidents from their teacher, Tatsuji Chibiki. Chibiki tells them the truth about the accidents, which are actually a curse connected to Misaki Yomiyama, a student of Class 3-3 who died 26 years ago. After his death, his classmates, unable to let him go, kept pretending that he was still around, even leaving an empty chair for him. However, this created an anomaly in which for every year afterward, a dead person would be a part of the class. Due to the extra body count, another student has to offer themselves to be excluded for the entire year; if the rule is broken, nature is compelled to "delete" the class members one by one. Also, mass amnesia affects the class for the duration of the year, so everyone would not know the identity of the deceased, even the person in question themselves.

After two more people die from the curse, Koichi and Mei discover a tape in an abandoned classroom. The tape, recorded by a Class 3-3 student from the year 1983, is a method of how to temporarily end the curse: by killing the extra person during the school trip held in August. During the trip, the two are allowed to mingle with their classmates, as Reiko decides that since deaths still occur despite the student exclusion method, they will have to try other methods. As Mei is adjusting her eyepatch, she looks at Reiko and realizes that she is the extra person. However, she is distracted by students uncovering the contents of the tape and spreading the news around, causing them to turn on each other. The commotion kills at least four people, including Chibiki, and sets the hotel on fire. Despite Koichi's attempt to save her, Reiko, learning about Mei's discovery, decides to let herself die and stop the curse.

Several days later, everyone in Yomiyama has forgotten about Reiko being there for the year. Koichi and Mei record another tape for juniors about the clues in ending the curse (the old one having been destroyed during the school trip). As his father has come home, Koichi leaves Yomiyama and bids Mei goodbye. 14 years later, Koichi visits Yomiyama North to hand the tape to a student of Class 3-3, whose classroom teacher is revealed to be Chibiki.

== Cast ==
- Kento Yamazaki as Koichi Sakakibara
- Ai Hashimoto as Mei Misaki
- Yoshihiko Hakamada as Tatsuji Chibiki
- Ai Kato as Reiko Mikami
- Kiyotaka Uji as Naoya Teshigawara
- Kai Inowaki as Yuya Mochizuki
- Takashi Waka as Tomohiko Kazami
- Mika Akizuki as Izumi Akazawa
- Maya Okano as Yukari Sakuragi
- Memeco Sakata as Sanae Mizuno
- Miho Tsumiki as Kirika
- Bokuzō Masana as Shoji Kubodera
- Masaki Miura as Katsumi Matsunaga
- Chō Ginpun as Tamie Mikami

== Reception ==
The film grossed US$5.6 million at the Japanese box office.

== Accolades ==
Award nominations for Another
Year	Award	Category	Recipient	Result
2013	Award of the Japanese Academy	Newcomer of Year	Ai Hashimoto	Nominated
2013	Kinema Junpo Awards	Best New Actress	Ai Hashimoto	Won
