= Tokyo Tarareba Girls =

Japanese manga series by Akiko Higashimura

- Cover of the first tankōbon volume

東京タラレバ娘 (Tōkyō Tarareba Musume)
- Genre: Romantic comedy
- Manga
- Written by: Akiko Higashimura
- Published by: Kodansha
- English publisher: NA: Kodansha USA
- Magazine: Kiss
- Original run: March 24, 2014 – April 25, 2017
- Volumes: 9
- Television drama
- Directed by: Seiichi Nagumo; Yuma Suzuki; Naoko Komuro
- Produced by: Masatoshi Kato
- Written by: Yūko Matsuda
- Music by: Yugo Kanno
- Original network: Nippon TV
- Original run: January 18, 2017 – March 22, 2017
- Episodes: 10
- Manga

Tokyo Tarareba Girls Extra Edition: Tarare-Bar
- Written by: Akiko Higashimura
- Published by: Kodansha
- Magazine: Kiss
- Original run: October 25, 2017 – December 25, 2018
- Volumes: 1
- Manga

Tokyo Tarareba Girls Returns
- Written by: Akiko Higashimura
- Published by: Kodansha
- English publisher: NA: Kodansha USA
- Magazine: Kiss
- Original run: October 25, 2018 – December 25, 2018
- Volumes: 1
- Manga

Tokyo Tarareba Girls Season 2
- Written by: Akiko Higashimura
- Published by: Kodansha
- English publisher: NA: Kodansha USA
- Magazine: Kiss
- Original run: April 25, 2019 – September 25, 2021
- Volumes: 6
- Live-action television film

Tokyo Tarareba Girls 2020
- Directed by: Yuma Suzuki
- Written by: Yūko Matsuda
- Music by: Yugo Kanno
- Released: October 7, 2020
- Runtime: 114 minutes

Tokyo Tarareba Girls (Japanese: 東京タラレバ娘, Hepburn: Tōkyō Tarareba Musume; lit. 'Tokyo 'What If' Girls') is a Japanese manga series written and illustrated by Akiko Higashimura. It was serialized in Kodansha's josei manga magazine Kiss from March 2014 to April 2017 and later collected in nine bound volumes. It is licensed for an English-language release by Kodansha USA. The manga won the Eisner Award for Best U.S. Edition of International Material—Asia in 2019.

A 10-episode live-action television drama series adaptation was broadcast on Nippon TV from January to March 2017. It was followed by a two-hour television special in October 2020. The manga also inspired three spin-off manga series written and illustrated by Higashimura and serialized in Kiss magazine: Tarare-Bar (2017–2018), Tokyo Tarareba Girls Returns (2018), and Tokyo Tarareba Girls Season 2 (2019–2021). The second spin-off, Tokyo Tarareba Girls Returns, is licensed for an English-language release by Kodansha USA.

== Plot ==
Rinko, a screenwriter living in Tokyo, remains unmarried at 33 years old. She has not been satisfied in love or at work and often goes out drinking with Kaori and Koyuki, her best friends since high school. One day, while the three women are dining and drinking at an izakaya as usual, complaining about the men they have dated, a mysterious and handsome young man with blond hair named Key tells them that they remain unmarried because they are always talking about "If I had done..." or "If he had been...". After hearing this, Rinko makes up her mind to get married by 2020, the year of the Tokyo Olympic Games.

== Characters ==
Rinko Kamata (鎌田 倫子, Kamata Rinko)
Portrayed by: Yuriko Yoshitaka
Kaori Yamakawa (山川 香, Yamakawa Kaori)
Portrayed by: Nana Eikura
Koyuki Torii (鳥居 小雪, Torii Koyuki)
Portrayed by: Yuko Oshima
Key (キー, Kī) / Haruki Kagitani (鍵谷 春樹, Kagitani Haruki)
Portrayed by: Kentaro Sakaguchi
Tetsuro Hayasaka (早坂 哲郎, Hayasaka Tetsurō)
Portrayed by: Ryohei Suzuki
Ryo Samejima (鮫島 涼, Samejima Ryō)
Portrayed by: Yūta Hiraoka
Mami Shibata (芝田 マミ, Shibata Mami)
Portrayed by: Ren Ishikawa
Yasuo Torii (鳥居 安男, Torii Yasuo)
Portrayed by: Akio Kaneda
Yoshio Marui (丸井 良男, Marui Yoshio)
Portrayed by: Kei Tanaka
Tara (タラ)
Voiced by: Ryō Katō
Reba (レバ)
Voiced by: Ayaka Nishiwaki

== Media ==
=== Manga ===
Written and illustrated by Akiko Higashimura, Tokyo Tarareba Girls was serialized in Kodansha's josei manga magazine Kiss from the March 24, 2014, to April 25, 2017. Kodansha collected the individual chapters in nine tankōbon volumes published from September 2014 to July 2017.

Kodansha USA licensed the manga for an English-language release in North America. It was first released digitally in February 2017, and later published in print from June 2018 to October 2019.

==== Volumes ====
No.	Original release date	Original ISBN	English release date	English ISBN
1	September 12, 2014	978-4-06-340935-2	June 26, 2018	978-1-63236-685-6
2	May 13, 2015	978-4-06-340956-7	August 7, 2018	978-1-63236-686-3
3	August 12, 2015	978-4-06-340964-2	October 16, 2018	978-1-63236-687-0
4	December 11, 2015	978-4-06-340974-1	December 31, 2018	978-1-63236-688-7
5	May 13, 2016	978-4-06-340988-8	February 12, 2019	978-1-63236-735-8
6	September 13, 2016	978-4-06-340997-0	April 9, 2019	978-1-63236-736-5
7	January 13, 2017	978-4-06-398007-3	June 25, 2019	978-1-63236-800-3
8	April 13, 2017	978-4-06-398017-2	August 6, 2019	978-1-63236-801-0
9	July 13, 2017	978-4-06-398024-0	October 15, 2019	978-1-63236-857-7

=== Spin-offs ===
Tokyo Tarareba Girls inspired three spin-off manga series, also written and illustrated by Akiko Higashimura. The first manga series, titled Tokyo Tarareba Girls Extra Edition: Tarare-Bar (東京タラレバ娘番外編 タラレBar, Tōkyō Tarareba Musume Bangai-hen: Tarare-Bar), features Tara and Reba—the talking codfish milt and liver mascots from Rinko's fantasies—running a bar and giving relationship advice in response to reader-submitted questions. It was serialized in Kodansha's josei manga magazine Kiss from the December 2017 issue (released on October 25, 2017) to the February 2019 issue (released on December 25, 2018). Kodansha collected the 10 chapters in a single tankōbon volume published on March 13, 2019.

The second manga series, titled Tokyo Tarareba Girls Returns (東京タラレバ娘 リターンズ, Tōkyō Tarareba Musume Ritānzu), follows the lives of Rinko, Kaori, and Koyuki after the events of Tokyo Tarareba Girls. It was serialized in Kiss from the December 2018 issue (released on October 25, 2018) to the February 2019 issue (released on December 25, 2018). Kodansha collected the three chapters in a single tankōbon volume published on March 13, 2019. At their 2019 Anime NYC panel, Kodansha USA announced they licensed the series for an English-language release, to be made available digitally on December 24, 2019. The volume was delayed and instead released on October 6, 2020.

The third manga series, titled Tokyo Tarareba Girls Season 2 (東京タラレバ娘 シーズン2, Tōkyō Tarareba Musume Shīzun 2), follows a new cast of characters and is centered on 30-year-old Reina Hirota, a single, part-time librarian who lives with her parents. It was serialized in Kiss from the June 2019 issue (released on April 25, 2019) to the November 2021 issue (released on September 25, 2021). Kodansha collected the series in six tankōbon volumes published from October 11, 2019, to November 12, 2021. Kodansha USA has licensed the series for digital release, with the first volume set to be released on July 9, 2024.

=== Live-action ===
A 10-episode live-action television drama series adaptation of Tokyo Tarareba Girls was broadcast on Nippon TV from January 18 to March 22, 2017. The series was directed by Seiichi Nagumo, Yuma Suzuki, and Naoko Komuro, and written by Yūko Matsuda. It starred Yuriko Yoshitaka as Rinko, Nana Eikura as Kaori, Yuko Oshima as Koyuki, and Kentaro Sakaguchi as Key. Its opening theme song was "Tokyo Girl" by J-pop girl group Perfume. The series was released on DVD and Blu-ray in Japan on August 2, 2017.

A two-hour television special, titled Tokyo Tarareba Girls 2020 (東京タラレバ娘2020, Tōkyō Tarareba Musume 2020 or Tokyo Girls on prime video), aired on Nippon TV on October 7, 2020. It was also directed by Yuma Suzuki and written by Yūko Matsuda, with the cast of the 2017 television drama series returning to reprise their roles.

== Reception ==
Volume 2 of Tokyo Tarareba Girls reached the 5th place on the weekly Oricon manga chart and, as of May 24, 2015, had sold 95,639 copies; volume 3 reached the 17th place on the chart and, as of August 23, 2015, had sold 110,632 copies; volume 4 reached the 12th place and, as of December 20, 2015, had sold 114,433 copies; volume 5 reached the 6th place and, as of May 29, 2016, had sold 157,244 copies; volume 6 reached the 4th place and, as of September 18, 2016, had sold 112,865 copies; volume 7 reached the 1st place and, as of January 21, 2017, had sold 73,574 copies.

The series ranked number two on the 2015 Kono Manga ga Sugoi! Top 20 Manga for Female Readers survey, and was again number two on the same list the following year. Kadokawa Media Factory's book and manga news magazine Da Vinci ranked the series number 19 on its 2017 Book of the Year list.

Tokyo Tarareba Girls was nominated for the 9th Manga Taishō in 2016, finishing in ninth place with 29 points. It was also nominated for Best General Manga at the 40th Kodansha Manga Awards in 2016. It won an Eisner Award in the category Best U.S. Edition of International Material—Asia in 2019.
