= Blank Canvas: My So-Called Artist's Journey =

Japanese manga series

- Cover art for the first volume, featuring the main character, Akiko Hayashi

かくかくしかじか (Kakukaku Shikajika)
- Genre: Autobiography, slice of life
- Manga
- Written by: Akiko Higashimura
- Published by: Shueisha
- English publisher: NA: Seven Seas Entertainment
- Magazine: Cocohana
- Original run: November 28, 2011 – January 28, 2015
- Volumes: 5
- Live-action film
- Directed by: Kazuaki Seki
- Written by: Date-san; Akiko Higashimura
- Music by: Yuki Munakata
- Studio: Warner Bros. Japan
- Released: May 16, 2025

Blank Canvas: My So-Called Artist's Journey, known in Japan as Kakukaku Shikajika (Japanese: かくかくしかじか; "So-and-so, Such-and-such"), is an autobiographical josei manga series written and illustrated by Akiko Higashimura. It was serialized in Shueisha's monthly manga magazine Cocohana from 2011 to 2015 and collected in five tankōbon volumes. The series is licensed in English by Seven Seas Entertainment.

== Plot ==
Blank Canvas follows Higashimura from her teenage years into adulthood as she aims to fulfill her childhood dream of becoming a successful manga artist.

The manga's early chapters focus on her third year of high school, where she begins taking an informal art class to prepare for college, only to find that her new teacher, Kenzou Hidaka, is a harsh and temperamental man who initially thinks her art is terrible. As the months pass, Hidaka grows more invested in helping Higashimura meet her goals, while she fights to succeed in her art school entrance exams.

== Characters ==
Akiko Hayashi (林明子, Hayashi Akiko)
Portrayed by: Mei Nagano
Kenzō Hidaka (日高健三, Hidaka Kenzō)
Portrayed by: Yo Oizumi

== Media ==
=== Manga ===
The individual chapters, referred to as "canvases", were serialized in Cocohana magazine between the inaugural January 2012 issue (sold on November 28, 2011) and the March 2015 issue (sold on January 28, 2015). They were later published by Shueisha in five tankōbon volumes. The third, fourth, and fifth volumes also included bonus "sketchbook" chapters.

No.	Original release date	Original ISBN	English release date	English ISBN
1	July 25, 2012	978-4-08-782457-5	March 21, 2019	978-1-642750-69-0
Chapters 1–7
2	May 24, 2013	978-4-08-782653-1	August 27, 2019	978-1-642750-70-6
Chapters 8–14
3	January 24, 2014	978-4-08-782746-0	November 19, 2019	978-1-642750-71-3
Chapters 15–21; Sketchbook
4	July 25, 2014	978-4-08-782797-2	March 31, 2020	978-1-642750-72-0
Chapters 22–28; Sketchbook
5	March 25, 2015	978-4-08-792004-8	June 30, 2020	978-1-642750-73-7
Chapters 29–34; Sketchbook

=== Live-action film ===
A live-action film adaptation was announced on December 17, 2024. The film is produced by Warner Bros. Japan and directed by Kazuaki Seki, with the screenplay written by Higashimura and Date-san, and music composed by Yuki Munakata. It premiered in Japanese theaters on May 16, 2025.

== Reception ==
The series was number five on the 2013 and 2014 Kono Manga ga Sugoi! Top 20 Manga for Female Readers surveys and number seven on the 2015 survey. It was number four in the 2013 Comic Natalie Grand Prize. In 2015, it won the eighth Manga Taishō Award, and was awarded the grand prize in the manga division by Japan's Agency for Cultural Affairs at the 19th Japan Media Arts Festival.

Volume 2 sold 49,232 copies as of June 2013 and volume 3 sold 47,446 copies as of February 2014.
