= Pietà (manga) =

Japanese josei manga by Nanae Haruno

- Cover of volume 1 as published by Shueisha

ピエタ
- Genre: Romance, Yuri
- Manga
- Written by: Nanae Haruno
- Published by: Shueisha
- Magazine: Young You
- Original run: April 1998 – October 1999
- Volumes: 2

Pietà (ピエタ) is a Japanese josei yuri manga by Nanae Haruno. It was originally serialized in the manga magazine Young You, published by Shueisha. The chapters were collected into two tankōbon volumes, the first released on April 19, 2000, and the second on May 19, 2000. The second volume also contains a sequel short story, "A Week at the Beach," showing the main characters at a later time.

The word "pietà" is Italian for "pity" or "mercy".

== Plot ==
Rio Sakaki is a high school girl who cuts herself and has attempted suicide a few times. She is unloved by her family—her stepmother is especially abusive, and her father, while aware of the abuse, does nothing to stop it. At the beginning of the manga, Rio meets Sahoko Higa, a classmate who spent two years as a hikikomori. They fall in love and begin spending a lot of time together, but Rio's inner demons, especially those that involve the gaps in her memory and her deceased baby sister, threaten to cause Rio to relapse into a suicidal state.

== Characters ==
Rio Sakaki (賢木理央, Sakaki Rio)
Due to being neglected by her family, Rio is withdrawn and depressed. She has few hopes and ambitions for the future, and at her stepmother's insistence, she lives in a different house, away from her family.
Sahoko Higa (比賀佐保子, Higa Sahoko)
A classmate of Rio, although she is two years older. Before the manga begins, she went through a period in which she refused to come out of her room. As a way to relieve her stress, she does not live with her parents, but she still has a decent relationship with them.
Shoumitsu Minori (御法先生, Minori Shōmitsu)
Rio's psychologist. He and his wife first met Rio seven years before the manga begins. He has high hopes for Rio's recovery, but worries about the negative influence of her family.
Kyouko Minori (御法鏡子, Minori Kyōko)
Like her husband Shoumitsu, she is a psychologist. She was the one who oversaw Sahoko's treatment during her hikikomori stage. Like her husband, she cares greatly about Rio, but she fears that they cannot help her.
Shigeko Sakaki (賢木繁子, Sakaki Shigeko)
Rio's stepmother. She has two children of her own, one by a previous lover and one by Rio's father. She hates Rio and emotionally abuses her. Rio's father does nothing to stop the abuse, as he claims that he cannot seem to love Rio because he is uncertain if she is really his biological daughter.

== Manga ==
Pietà was serialized in the josei manga magazine Young You, published by Shueisha. The chapters were collected into two tankōbon, which are out of print as of 2009.

No.	Release date	ISBN
1	April 19, 2000	978-4-08-864487-5
Chapter 1 Chapter 2 Chapter 3 Cover characters: Rio Sakaki
2	May 19, 2000	978-4-08-864488-2
Chapter 4 Chapter 5 Extra Story: "A Week at the Beach" Cover characters: Sahoko Higa
