= Pride (manga) =

Manga series by Yukari Ichijo

プライド (Puraido)
- Manga
- Written by: Yukari Ichijo
- Published by: Shueisha
- Magazine: Chorus
- Original run: 2002 – 2010
- Volumes: 12
- Live-action film
- Directed by: Shūsuke Kaneko
- Produced by: Yoshio Sakai; Ikuo Suo
- Written by: Yukari Ichijo; Miyuki Takahashi; Hidehiro Ito
- Music by: Nobuyuki Shimizu
- Released: January 17, 2009
- Runtime: 126 minutes

Pride (プライド, Puraido) is a manga series by Yukari Ichijo serialized in Chorus magazine. In 2007 it won the Excellence Prize for manga at the 11th Japan Media Arts Festival. In 2009, it was adapted into a live-action film starring the American singer and actress Stephanie as the protagonist: the aspiring opera singer Shio Asami.
