= Takurō Kitagawa =

Japanese actor and voice actor

Takurō Kitagawa (喜多川 拓郎, Kitagawa Takurō; born December 12, 1949) is a Japanese actor and voice actor from Tokyo, Japan. He was represented by Sigma Seven and is now a freelancer.

== Filmography ==
=== Anime television series ===
- Another (Yosuke Sakakibara)
- Brave Police J-Decker (Edgar Hopkins)
- Cyber Team in Akihabara (Cigogne Raspaile)
- Gantz (Yoshida)
- Highschool! Kimen-gumi (Auzō Sainan)
- Mobile Suit Zeta Gundam (Chan Ya)
- Muka Muka Paradise (鹿谷葉三)
- Soul Eater (Fisher King)
- The Transformers (Astrotrain, Cliffjumper, Dashiell Faireborn, *Grimlock, Headstrong, Inferno, Lightspeed, Ligier (Mirage), Mixmaster, Ramhorn, Scavenger, Skydive, Warpath)
- Yokoyama Mitsuteru Sangokushi (Xu Shu, Li Su)

=== OVA ===
- Tenchi Muyo! (Nobeyama)

=== Anime films ===
- The Transformers: The Movie (Cliffjumper, Grimlock, Astrotrain)

=== Drama CDs ===
- Aisaresugite Kodoku series 2: Itoshisugita Shifuku (Asakawa's father)

=== Dubbing ===
- Apollo 13 (Ted)
- Donnie Brasco (Pony Canyon edition) (Richie Gazzo (Rocco Sisto))
- For Love of the Game (Gus Sinski)
- The Ghost Writer (Paul Emmett (Tom Wilkinson))
- Goosebumps (Dr. Finley) (Episode: You can't scare me!)
- L.A. Law (Stuart Markowitz)
- Police Academy (Larvell Jones)
- Song of the Sea (Ferry Dan / The Great Seanachaí)
- The West Wing (Ron Butterfield)

=== Tokusatsu ===
- Seijuu Sentai Gingaman (Torbador)

=== Japanese Voice-Over ===
- Peter Pan's Flight (Pirates Patrick)
