= Yūkan Club =

Japanese manga series

- Cover of the first tankōbon volume, featuring Karen Kizakura (front), Miroku Shochikubai (right), Granmarie Bidou (top right) and Noriko Hakushika (back)

有閑倶楽部 (Yūkan Kurabu)
- Genre: Comedy
- Manga
- Written by: Yukari Ichijo
- Published by: Shueisha
- Magazine: Bessatsu Margaret
- Original run: 1982 – 2002
- Volumes: 19
- Original video animation
- Directed by: Setsuko Shibuichi
- Licensed by: Magic Bus
- Released: July 25, 1991 – December 14, 1991
- Runtime: 24 minutes
- Episodes: 2
- Television drama
- Directed by: Taro Oya
- Written by: Yukari Ichijo; Michiru Egashira
- Original network: Nippon Television
- Original run: October 16, 2007 – December 18, 2007
- Episodes: 10

Yūkan Club (Japanese: 有閑倶楽部, Hepburn: Yūkan Kurabu; lit. "The Leisure Club") is a Japanese manga written and illustrated by Yukari Ichijo. It is serialized in Shueisha's Bessatsu Margaret. Yūkan Club received the 1986 Kodansha Manga Award for the shōjo category. The manga was adapted into an original video animation by Madhouse Studios. It was also adapted into a Japanese television drama.

== Plot ==
Set at St. President Academy, an elite and extraordinarily wealthy school, the story centers on the Yūkan Club, a group of six affluent and highly capable students who take on dangerous problems to relieve their boredom. The members include Shōchikubai Miroku, a well-connected brawler with a passion for motorcycles; Kikumasamune Seishirō, the brilliant and formidable heir to a major hospital; Bidō Granmarie, the flirtatious son of a Swedish ambassador; Kenbishi Yūri, the gluttonous but strong-willed daughter of a global business leader; Hakushika Noriko, a violent man-hater from a distinguished artistic family; and Kizakura Karen, who aspires to marry into wealth. Revered by their peers, the Yūkan Club tackles kidnappings, conspiracies, criminal plots, and other extreme situations that threaten their classmates or school, treating each case as both an adventure and a way to pass time.

== Media ==
=== Manga ===
Yūkan Club was written and illustrated by Yukari Ichijo. Shueisha released the 19 bound volumes of the manga between December 13, 1982, and November 15, 2002. Shueisha re-released the manga into 10 kanzenban volumes between May 18, 2000, and April 18, 2002. Shueisha re-released the manga a second time into 9 kanzenban volumes. The third revision of the manga was called Yūkan Club DX (有閑倶楽部 DX, Yūkan Kurabu DX; lit. 'The Leisure Club DX'). The first three kanzenban volumes were released simultaneously on October 15, 2007. The next three kanzenban volumes were released on November 15, 2007. The final three kanzenban volumes were released on December 14, 2007. The manga is licensed in Indonesia by Elex Media Komputindo.

=== OVAs ===
The manga was adapted into an original video animation. The first OVA's ending theme was "Shake Dance" by Toy Boys, while "Rainy Dance", also by Toy Boys, was the second OVA's ending theme. The first OVA was released on a VHS on July 25, 1991. The second OVA premiered on December 14, 1991, as a film, in Toho cinemas. The second OVA was released on April 25, 1992. Both of the VHSs were released by Madhouse Studios.

=== TV Drama ===
Directed by Taro Oya, the drama's 10 episodes were broadcast on Nippon Television between October 16, 2007, and December 18, 2007. On April 23, 2008, VAP released a DVD Box set containing five DVDs, spanning the 10 episodes of the drama. The theme song of the series is "Keep The Faith" by KAT-TUN. It was voted the fifth best selling single listed on the Oricon charts in 2007.

Main cast:

- Jin Akanishi as Miroku Shochikubai
- Yu Yokoyama as Seishiro Kikumasamune
- Junnosuke Taguchi as Granmarie Bido
- Minami as Yuri Kenbishi
- Yu Kashii as Noriko Hakushika
- Emi Suzuki as Karen Kizakura
- Takeshi Kaga as Jishu Shochikubai
- Tsurutaro Kataoka as Mansaku Kenbishi
- Kazuko Kato as Yuriko Kenbishi

On November 21, 2007, Sony Music Entertainment released a single for the theme song of the drama. The lyrics were written by Kyosuke Himuro. On November 28, 2007, wint released a soundtrack CD for Yūkan Club. The songs are sung by Jin Akanishi and are composed by Kyosuke Himuro.

Yūkan Club won four of the five awards at the 2007 Nikkan Sports Drama Grand Prix. Jin Akanishi was awarded best actor; Junnosuke Taguchi was awarded best supporting actor; Yu Kashii was awarded best supporting actress and Yūkan Club was awarded best drama of 2007.

== Reception ==
More than 27 million copies were sold of the manga volumes, making the series one of the best-selling manga series.
