= Roommate (2013 film) =

- Poster

Japanese name
- Kanji: ルームメイト
Transcriptions
- Revised Hepburn: Rūmumeito
- Directed by: Takeshi Furusawa
- Screenplay by: Takeshi Furusawa
- Based on: Rūmumeito by Aya Imamura
- Starring: Keiko Kitagawa; Kyoko Fukada
- Production companies: Toei; Toho Pictures; Bridgehead; Tokyo MX; Kinoshita Group; Pony Canyon; Toei Video; Yomiuri Shimbun; Pia Corporation; GyaO; Chuokoron-Shinsha; Warner Music Japan / Unborde; Niconico Video
- Distributed by: Toei
- Release date: November 9, 2013
- Running time: 110 minutes
- Country: Japan
- Language: Japanese

Roommate (ルームメイト, Rūmumeito) is a 2013 Japanese psychological horror film directed by Takeshi Furusawa and based on the novel Rūmumeito by Aya Imamura.

== Cast ==
- Keiko Kitagawa as Harumi Hagio
- Kyoko Fukada as Reiko Nishimura
- Kengo Kora as Kensuke Kudo
- Hiroyuki Onoue
- Chihiro Otsuka
- Mariko Tsutsui
- Yukijiro Hotaru
- Tomorowo Taguchi
- Riko Yoshida as young Harumi
