= Tokyo Alice =

Japanese manga series

- First tankōbon volume cover

東京アリス (Tōkyō Arisu)
- Genre: Romance, slice of life
- Manga
- Written by: Toriko Chiya
- Published by: Kodansha
- Magazine: Kiss
- Original run: October 25, 2005 – August 25, 2015
- Volumes: 15
- Television drama
- Directed by: Natsuki Seta; Takeo Kikuchi
- Written by: Kumiko Asō
- Original network: Amazon Prime Video
- Original run: August 25, 2017 – November 10, 2017
- Episodes: 12

Tokyo Alice (東京アリス, Tōkyō Arisu) is a Japanese manga series written and illustrated by Toriko Chiya. It was serialized in Kodansha's josei manga magazine Kiss from October 25, 2005, to August 25, 2015. Its chapters were collected in 15 tankōbon volumes. A live-action drama premiered in Japan from August 25, 2017, and ran for 12 episodes; it was later released internationally on Amazon Prime Video in 2019.

== Characters ==
- Fu Arisugawa (portrayed by Mizuki Yamamoto), a free-spirited office worker at a design production company. She loves shopping and is usually thinking about getting fashions at boutique shops. She is 26 years old at the start of the series.^{Vol. 2 profiles} She develops an interest in her boss Shinji Okuzono.
- Sayuri Enjoji (portrayed by Aya Asahina), an upper-class girl who works as a gallery assistant in Ginza. She feels she must comply with her family's expectations of marrying a University of Tokyo alumnus, and allows them to set up a suitor for an arranged marriage. However, she plans on living it up with casual sex partners.^{Vol. 2 profiles} Her family owns the house that she, Fu and Mizuho live in. She later runs away from her arranged marriage wedding. She eventually marries Akira Hiyama in Paris.^{Vol. 13 profiles}
- Mizuho Haneda (portrayed by Reina Triendl), a manga artist who had an aspiring musician boyfriend at the start of the series.^{Vol. 2 profiles} After their breakup, she moves in with Fu and Sayuri.^{Vol. 3 profiles}
- Rio Sakuragawa (portrayed by Maryjun Takahashi), a psychosomatic doctor who declines opportunities for romance at work. She harbors romantic feelings for Fu.^{Vol. 2 profiles} She does not live with the other girls, but frequents their place a lot.
- Shinji Okuzono (portrayed by Ryohei Otani), Fu's boss. He is nicknamed the Ice Man because of his cool demeanor. He and Fu get into a complicated relationship.^{Vol. 2 profiles}
- Shun Odagiri (portrayed by Shunya Shiraishi), a wealthy heir to Hinode Bussan, he is working at Fu's place to gain some real world experience.^{Vol. 3 profiles}
- Haruto Izumi (portrayed by Yosuke Sugino), a male nurse who is interested in Rio to the point of stalking her.^{Vol. 3 profiles}
- Akira Hiyama (portrayed by Shunsuke Daito), a former schoolmate of Okuzono from university. He is described as having a poker face, that is, it is difficult to read what he is really thinking.^{Vol. 9 profiles} He later marries Sayuri.^{Vol. 13 profiles}
- Ken Shinonome (portrayed by Yuta Koseki), Okuzono's friend from high school. He falls in love with Rio.^{Vol. 12 profiles}
- Tamaki Sawamura, an administrator in Fu and Okuzono's office, described as a "female leopard". She expresses interest in Okuzono.^{Vol. 13 profiles}
- Members of the Planning Arts are coworkers at Fu and Okuzono's office. They include: chief Yusuke Kashii (portrayed by Shuntaro Yanagi), who has a daughter Miu and pet dog Moshap; employee Kaoru Sata; employee Kirio Iioka, who is actually gay; and part-timer Akari Kawasuma.^{Vol. 13 profiles}

== Volumes ==
Individual chapters of the series are numbered as shopping, such as "Shopping: 1".^{Vol. 1}

- 1 (September 13, 2006)
- 2 (July 13, 2007)
- 3 (May 23, 2008)
- 4 (February 13, 2009)
- 5 (November 13, 2009)
- 6 (November 12, 2010)
- 7 (June 24, 2011)
- 8 (February 13, 2012)
- 9 (July 13, 2012)
- 10 (January 11, 2013)
- 11 (July 12, 2013)
- 12 (January 10, 2014)
- 13 (July 11, 2014)
- 14 (January 13, 2015)
- 15 (September 15, 2015)

== Reception ==
Volume 4 reached the 18th place on the weekly Oricon manga chart and, as of February 23, 2009, has sold 68,715 copies; volume 5 reached the 15th place and, as of November 15, 2009, has sold 32,259 copies; volume 6 reached the 19th place and, as of November 21, 2010, has sold 69,800 copies; volume 7 reached the 22nd place and, as of July 3, 2011, has sold 69,064 copies; volume 8 reached the 15th place and, as of February 19, 2012, has sold 48,887 copies; volume 10 reached the 23rd place and, as of January 20, 2013, has sold 58,779 copies; volume 11 reached the 33rd place and, as of July 20, 2013, has sold 55,090 copies; volume 12 reached the 35th place and, as of January 19, 2014, has sold 49,663 copies; volume 13 reached the 33rd place and, as of July 20, 2014, has sold 48,126 copies.

It was nominated for Best Shōjo Manga at the 38th Kodansha Manga Awards.

== Works cited ==
- "Ch." is shortened form for chapter and refers to a chapter number of the Tokyo Alice manga.
- "Ep." is shortened form for chapter and refers to an episode number of the Tokyo Alice live-action drama.
