= Papa Told Me =

Japanese manga series

- First tankōbon volume cover
- Manga
- Written by: Nanae Haruno
- Published by: Shueisha
- English publisher: Shueisha (digital)
- Imprint: Young You Comics; Queen's Comics (extras)
- Magazine: Young You
- Original run: June 1987 – June 2003
- Volumes: 27 + 4 extras
- Television drama
- Original network: NHK E
- Original run: April 12, 2003 – June 28, 2003
- Episodes: 12
- Manga

Papa Told Me: Cocohana ver.
- Written by: Nanae Haruno
- Published by: Shueisha
- Imprint: Margaret Comics Cocohana
- Magazine: Cocohana
- Original run: November 28, 2011 – present
- Volumes: 14
- icon

Papa Told Me (stylized as Papa told me) is a Japanese manga series written and illustrated by Nanae Haruno. It was serialized in Shueisha's josei manga magazine Young You from 1987 to 2003, with its chapters collected in 27 tankōbon volumes. Since then, additional chapters were published irregularly in other magazines. Another series, released under the title Papa Told Me: Cocohana ver., have been published in Cocohana since 2011.

A 12-episode television drama adaptation was broadcast on NHK E in 2003.

In 1990, Papa Told Me won the 35th Shogakukan Manga Award in the shōjo category.

== Plot ==
Chise is an elementary school girl who lives with her widowed father, a novelist. Her mother died when she was very young, but she is extremely close to her father. He is the one she loves the most, and because he works as a novelist, he spends most of his time at home, much to the delight of Chise.

== Media ==
=== Manga ===
Written and illustrated by Nanae Haruno, Papa Told Me started in Shueisha's josei manga magazine Young You in the June 1987 issue. The series finished with 149 chapters on June 7, 2003. Shueisha collected its chapters in 27 tankōbon volumes, released from February 19, 1988, to January 19, 2004. Additional chapters were later irregularly published in Chorus and Bessatsu Chorus, and four additional volumes: Machi o Arukeba (街を歩けば; lit. 'If You Walk Through the City'); Watashi no Sukina Wakusei (私の好きな惑星; lit. 'My Favorite Planet'); Kafe de Michikusa (カフェで道草; lit. 'Stopping by a Café'); and Mado ni Akari no Tomoru Koro (窓に灯りのともる頃; lit. 'When the Lights Come on In the Windows'), were released from April 18, 2008, to June 17, 2011.

On November 28, 2011, Chorus was succeeded by Cocohana, where the series has continued publication. Shueisha has released the collected volumes under the title Papa Told Me: Cocohana ver., and the first volume was released on August 2, 2012. As of April 23, 2026, 14 volumes have been released.

In 2026, the series became digitally available in English on Shueisha's Manga Million platform.

=== Drama ===
A 12-episode television drama adaptation was broadcast on NHK E from April 12 to June 28, 2003.

== Reception ==
Papa Told Me won the 35th Shogakukan Manga Award in the shōjo category in 1990.
