= Bouquet (magazine) =

Japanese manga magazine

- Cover of the December 1990 issue of Bouquet with art from Itaikena Hitomi by Sakumi Yoshino
- Categories: Shōjo manga
- Frequency: Monthly
- Circulation: 198,000 (1995)
- First issue: 1978
- Final issue: 2000
- Company: Shueisha
- Country: Japan
- Based in: Tokyo
- Language: Japanese

Bouquet (Japanese: ぶ〜け, Hepburn: Būke) was a monthly Japanese shōjo manga magazine. It was published by Shueisha between 1978 and 2000.

== History ==
The magazines was founded in 1978. The name "Bouquet" is meant to invoke a flower bouquet. This is considered a metaphoric combination of the shōjo magazines Margaret and Ribon by the same publisher, as in putting a ribon around a bouquet of marguerite flowers. The magazine replaced the magazines Ribon Deluxe and Petit Margaret, which had been published as sister magazines to Ribon and Margaret respectively. Many of the artists working for these two magazines shifted to working for Bouquet. Bouquet was the first shōjo manga magazine published in an A5 format.

The sister magazine Bouquet Deluxe was published from 1980 on and Bouquet Selection from 1983 on. Tankōbon versions of short stories and manga series published in these magazine were released under the imprint Bouquet Comics. In 1994, the imprint's name was changed to Bouquet Margaret Comics.

The magazine's readership in 1997 was reflecting that the readership had changed more towards josei manga: 57.8% of readers then were college students, "office ladies" and housewives; 27.3% were high school students and 12.3% were middle school students. In 1995, the magazine had a circulation of 198.000 copies per issue, in 1996 and 1997 the circulation was 150.000.

In 1999, the editors of Bouquet switched to working on the magazine Cookie instead. On 16 February 2000, last issue of the magazine (March 2020 issue) was published. Some of the ongoing series of Bouquet at that time, such as Clover or Zoccha no Nichijō, continued their serialization in Cookie. Some series changed their settings, as they started to be published in new magazines. When Zoccha no Nichijō switched magazines, Yumi Ikefuji changed the main character of her series to be a high school student instead of a married couple, as the target group of Cookie was younger than that of Bouquet.

== Legacy ==
Several award-winning works were serialized in Bouquet. Akemi Matsunae's Junjō Crazy Fruits won the Kodansha Manga Award in 1988, Mieko Ōsaka's Eien no Nohara won it in 1991; Wakako Mizuki won the Seiun Award twice for science-fiction manga she published in Bouquet, the first time in 1981 for Densetsu and the second time in 2000 for Itihāsa. Renowned Year 24 Group artist Yumiko Ōshima published several short stories in the magazine.

The magazine marked the career start of several artists. Riho Ueza (1979), Sakumi Yoshino (1980), Mieko Ōsaka (1982) and Takumi Ishida (1993) published their debut work in the magazine. Noriko Irie won the magazine's newcomer award in 1988 and Mari Okazaki in 1994.

== Serialized manga (selection) ==
=== Series ===
- Sora no Iro ni niteiru (空の色に似ている) by Yoshimi Uchida (1980)
- Kōenji atari (高円寺あたり) by Yoshiko Nishitani (1980–1981)
- Star Clock Liddell by Yoshimi Uchida (1982–1983)
- Junjō Crazy Fruits by Akemi Matsunae (1982–1988)
- Nijinskii Gūwa (ニジンスキー寓話) by Kyoko Ariyoshi (1984–1990)
- Shōnen wa Kouya o Mezasu (少年は荒野をめざす) by Sakumi Yoshino (1985–1987)
- Itihāsa (イティハーサ) by Wakako Mizuki (1988–1997)
- Eien no Nohara (永遠の野原) by Mieko Ōsaka (1988–1998)
- Kodomo ha nan demo shitte iru (子供はなんでも知っている) by Mariko Iwadate (1988–1996)
- Itaikena Hitomi (いたいけな瞳) by Sakumi Yoshino (1990–1993)
- Boku dake ga shitteiru (ぼくだけが知っている) by Sakumi Yoshino (1994–1998)
- Tengoku no Hana (天国の花) by Toriko Chiya (1994–1996)
- Clover by Toriko Chiya (1997, 1999–2000, transferred to Cookie)
- Ringo to Hachimitsu (林檎と蜂蜜) by Masayo Miyagawa (1998–2000, transferred to Cookie)
- Zoccha no Nichijō (ゾッチャの日常) by Yumi Ikefuji (1998–2000, transferred to Cookie)
- Akane-chan Over Drive by Mizuki Kawashita (1999–2000)
- Spoon Ippai no Aijō (スプーン一杯の愛情) by Takumi Ishida (1999)

=== Short stories ===
- "Densetsu" by Wakako Mizuki (1980)
