= Masako Watanabe =

Japanese manga artist (1929–2026)

- わたなべまさこ
- Born: 16 May 1929; Tokyo, Japan
- Died: 3 October 2026 (aged 97)
- Occupations: Illustrator, manga artist
- Years active: 1952–2026
- Known for: Namida no Sanbika

Masako Watanabe (わたなべまさこ, Watanabe Masako) (16 May 1929 – 3 October 2026) was a Japanese manga artist. She began her professional career as an illustrator of books in 1949. She switched to creating manga after reading Osamu Tezuka's works, debuting in 1952 with Namida no Sanbika. She quickly became the most popular female manga artist of her time.

== Career ==
Watanabe was noted in the 1960s for using pastel colors instead of the bright primary colors common at the time, and for pioneering both shōjo (written for teenage girls) horror stories with Blue Foxfire and shōjo mystery stories with Glass no Shiro (Glass Castle). In 1971, she received the Shogakukan Manga Award for Glass no Shiro and Sei Rosalindo. In the 1980s, she turned from shōjo to sexually explicit redisu-josei (written for adult women) with such series as Kinpeibai, which is based on a 19th-century Chinese erotic novel.

== Death ==
Watanabe died on 3 October 2026, at the age of 97.

== Works ==
- Namida no Sanbika
- Blue FoxFire
- The Glass Castle
- The Girl of the White Horse
- Saint Rosalind
