= Macoto Takahashi =

Japanese artist (1934–2024)

- 高橋真琴
- Born: 27 August 1934; Sumiyoshi-ku, Osaka, Empire of Japan
- Died: 17 November 2024 (aged 90)
- Style: Shōjo manga

Macoto Takahashi (高橋真琴, Takahashi Makoto; 27 August 1934 – 17 November 2024) was a Japanese painter, illustrator, and manga artist. His works of shōjo manga are noted for significantly influencing the aesthetic styles of that demographics.

== Biography ==
Macoto Takahashi was born on 27 August 1934 in Sumiyoshi-ku, Osaka, as the eldest son in a family of three boys. While pursuing art in high school, he was torn between the painting styles of nihonga (traditional Japanese-style painting) and yōga (Western-style painting). He decided to pursue jojōga 叙情画 (lyrical painting) after discovering the works of jojōga artist Jun'ichi Nakahara in the magazine Himawari. He began his career in 1953 illustrating books aimed at the loan market (kashi-hon). He began to create manga in 1956 with the shōjo manga (girls' manga) series Paris-Tokyo. That same year, he contributed to the nascent gekiga scene by adapting Sherlock Holmes stories for the kashi-hon manga magazine Kage. In 1957, he released several short shōjo manga stories, including "The Seaside of Sorrow", "The Swan of Tokyo", "The Swan of the Rose", and "Norowareta Kopperia" (English: Cursed Coppéllia).

In 1958, he established what would become his signature style of art influenced by both manga and jojōga with his manga series Arashi o koete (あらしをこえて; lit. "Beyond the Storm"), published in the magazine Shojo. This style was distinguished chiefly by its depiction of characters with traits typical of models in jojōga illustrations: thin bodies and large, sparkling eyes, with Takahashi having been referred to as "the king of eye sparkles". Other distinguishing traits include the superposition of panels, full-length portraits that fill the entirety of the page, backgrounds that arouse strong emotion, and non-narrative imagery. This style significantly influenced shōjo manga, and quickly became the standard visual conventions of that demographics. Takahashi also made the theme of ballet popular in shōjo manga with Norowareta Kopperia (Cursed Coppelia).

During the 1960s, Takahashi stopped creating shōjo manga, because he considered himself incapable of adopting the point of view of a girl. He shifted to illustration, creating album cover artwork, stationery, and covers of shōjo manga magazines, and became particularly popular with the Gothic Lolita subculture. Beginning in 1992, Takahashi mounted an annual exhibition of his work at his home in Sakura. In 2018, artwork by Takahashi was featured in designs created by the fashion house Comme des Garçons. In the 2020s, Takahashi created a series of paintings based on different countries, incorporating influences such as the French revolutionary calendar, national and seasonal flowers, and local architecture.

On 16 December 2024, it was announced through Takahashi's official Twitter account that he died from gastroesophageal junction cancer on 17 November 2024. He was 90 years old. His funeral was held on 25 November.

== Works ==
- Sakura Namiki [The Rows of Cherry Trees]. 1957.
- Akogare – Takahashi Macoto gashū (あこがれ―高橋真琴画集), 1995, Seibidō Shuppan. Reprinted 2006, BOOK-ING, ISBN 978-4-8354-4265-5
- Shōjo romance – Takahashi Macoto no sekai (少女ロマンス―高橋真琴の世界), 1999, Parco Shuppan, ISBN 978-4-89194-599-2
- Macoto no ohime-sama (MACOTOのおひめさま), 2001, Parco Shuppan, ISBN 978-4-89194-624-1
- Paris-Tokyo + Sakura namiki (パリー東京, さくら並木), 2006 (reprint), Shogakukan, ISBN 978-4-7780-3023-0
- Takahashi Macoto no shōjo nurie, Nihon no ohime-sama (高橋真琴の少女ぬりえ 日本のおひめさま), 2006, Kodansha, ISBN 978-4-06-213677-8
- Yumemiru shōjotachi (夢見る少女たち), 2013, PIE International, ISBN 978-4-7562-4380-5
- Macoto no bigaku (真琴の美学), 2015 (reprint), Fukkan dot-com, ISBN 978-4-8354-5196-1
- Takahashi Macoto Coloring Book (高橋真琴 ぬりえブック), 2016, Genkōsha, ISBN 978-4-7683-0730-4
- Romantic Otome Style (ロマンティック 乙女スタイル), 2017, PIE International, ISBN 978-4-7562-4964-7
