= List of Another episodes =

- Blu-ray collection cover, released in the United States by Sentai Filmworks
- No. of episodes: 12 + 1 OVA

Release
- Original network: KNB, KBS, Tokyo MX, CTC
- Original release: January 10 – March 27, 2012

Another is a 2012 Japanese adult animated horror television series produced by P.A. Works and directed by Tsutomu Mizushima that aired twelve episodes from 10 January to 27 March 2012. Based on the 2009 novel of the same name by Yukito Ayatsuji, the series is set in 1998 and focuses on a boy named Kōichi Sakakibara who, upon transferring into Yomiyama Middle School and meeting the curious Mei Misaki, finds himself in a mystery revolving around students and people related to his class facing gruesome and senseless deaths. Another was directed by Tsutomu Mizushima and produced by P.A. Works, with character designs by Yuriko Ishii, the chief animation director of the series, based on Noizi Ito's original concepts for the novel.

Another premiered in late-night slots on Kitanihon Broadcasting, TVQ Kyushu Broadcasting, and several independent TV stations, then appeared on Nippon BS Broadcasting beginning in April.

Sentai Filmworks has licensed the anime series for digital and home video release in 2012. An original video animation episode set before the beginning of the series was released on May 26, 2012, with a "0th" volume of the manga.

== Episodes ==
| No. | Title | Original release date |
|---|---|---|
| 0–OVA | "The Other"; Transliteration: "Inga" (Japanese: 因果) | May 26, 2012 |
Fourteen-year-old Mei secretly meets with her twin sister Fujioka. With her mother away, Fujioka spends the night at Mei's house. Mei sees the color of death on her through her doll's eye, and becomes very protective. While riding a Ferris wheel, a bird causes Fujioka to fall out of her carriage, but the carriage was low enough that she was not in danger. However, Fujioka suddenly collapses, being admitted into hospital and dying from leukemia. As Mei goes to give her final farewell to Fujioka, she has her first meeting with Kōichi.
| 1 | "Rough Sketch"; Transliteration: "Sobyō" (Japanese: 素描) | January 10, 2012 |
Because his father is working abroad, Kōichi Sakakibara moves to his birth town of Yomiyama to live with his grandparents and his aunt Reiko Mikami, where he spends the first month hospitalized due to a pneumothorax. His classmates, Izumi Akazawa, Tomohiko Kazami and Yukari Sakuragi, visit him but act strange. In the hospital, Kōichi meets an uncanny girl, Mei Misaki. Once he recovers, he attends school, where Mei says that their class, Class 9-3, is close to death.
| 2 | "Blueprint"; Transliteration: "Omowaku" (Japanese: 思惑) | January 17, 2012 |
At school, Kōichi's classmate Naoya Teshigawara lets slip that Class 9-3 is cursed. Troubled by Mei but drawn to her, Kōichi asks Sanae Mizuno, a nurse at the hospital, about a girl who may have died on the night of his discharge. Sanae reveals that a student did indeed die that night, and her name might have been Misaki, shocking Kōichi. He enters a mysterious doll shop, where he finds a doll with Mei's likeness, and meets Mei herself, who decides to show Kōichi what is under her eye-patch.
| 3 | "Bone Work"; Transliteration: "Honegumi" (Japanese: 骨組) | January 24, 2012 |
Mei reveals that one of her eyes is a doll's eye that can see strange things. She tells Kōichi the haunted legend of the town: a student from Class 9-3 of 1972 also named Misaki died but the class continued acting like Misaki was alive, thus inviting death. Kōichi's classmates avoid the story whenever he asks them about it. He learns that the girl who died in the hospital was Misaki Fujioka, Mei's cousin. After Mei claims that she can only be seen by Kōichi, Yukari starts to flee from them. However, she slips on the stairs that lead up to Class 9-3, impaling her neck on her own umbrella. Later that day, Yukari's mother also dies for the same reason.
| 4 | "Put Flesh"; Transliteration: "Rinkaku" (Japanese: 輪郭) | January 31, 2012 |
Kōichi encounters classmate Aya, whom he manages to save when they are nearly hit by a falling sheet of glass. At the doll shop, Mei tells Kōichi that "it has already begun". Kōichi confronts his classmates about not telling him what is going on. Sanae then contacts him, saying that when she asked her brother about Mei, he panicked and insisted no such person exists. Sanae then enters the elevator, which falls down the shaft and kills her. Kōichi hears the crash over his cellphone.
| 5 | "Build Limbs"; Transliteration: "Kakusan" (Japanese: 拡散) | February 7, 2012 |
Ikuo Takabayashi dies next from a fatal heart attack, and Kōichi's classmates start ignoring him. Mei explains that she does exist. After the 1972 Class 9-3 incident, there was always an extra student in the class. The "extra" was dead but did not know it. No one could identify who it was, and the deaths began, year after year, with no one remembering the "extra" after graduation; they would disappear. To prevent this, the class treats one student like they do not exist to make up for the student who is actually dead. This year, it is Mei, and now Kōichi.
| 6 | "Face to Face"; Transliteration: "Futari" (Japanese: 二人) | February 14, 2012 |
Now that Kōichi knows everything, he is okay with being ignored along with Mei, as Class 9-3 believes this "charm" will prevent the calamity. He and Mei begin spending time together and develop a good friendship. Kōichi's father asks him over the phone how it feels to be back in Yomiyama after being gone for a year, but Kōichi says it is his first time here. Kōichi and Mei discuss the curse with Tatsuji Chibiki, the librarian, including the death of the male student in 1972, Misaki Yomiyama, that started it all.
| 7 | "Sphere Joint"; Transliteration: "Henchō" (Japanese: 変調) | February 21, 2012 |
Shōji Kubodera, homeroom teacher of Class 9-3, commits suicide in front of the class. The class realizes that the "charm" has not stopped the curse, and begin acknowledging Kōichi and Mei again. Kōichi learns about Katsumi Matsunaga, a former Class 9-3 student who managed to stop the phenomenon in 1983, leaving a clue on how he did it for future students to find. Kōichi fears he may be the "extra" dead student this year, but Mei tells him he is not.
| 8 | "Hair Stand"; Transliteration: "Konpeki" (Japanese: 紺碧) | February 28, 2012 |
Kōichi, Izumi, Naoya and Yūya, along with classmates Takako Sugiura and Junta Nakao, go to a beach resort to meet Katsumi. They relax when they leave Yomiyama, convinced the curse is ineffective outside town. At the beach, Kōichi discovers Mei, and the group enjoys a fun afternoon. Katsumi joins them, but the only thing he remembers is that he left the clue in the classroom. When Junta drowns and his body is torn up by a motorboat, everyone realizes that the curse may not be limited in Yomiyama.
| 9 | "Body Paint"; Transliteration: "Rensa" (Japanese: 連鎖) | March 6, 2012 |
Chibiki reveals that Junta's death stemmed from a head trauma he received while still in Yomiyama. Kōichi finds Katsumi's clue: a cassette tape, in which Katsumi explains what happened on the school trip to the Yomiyama Shrine fifteen years ago. Two students died, but something very important happened. Before it can be revealed, Naoya accidentally breaks the tape but Yūya offers to repair it. Aya and her family were later killed in a road accident while escaping town as a boulder forces their vehicle into a ravine, and Yumi Ogura's brother dies after a runaway truck carrying an excavator smashes into his apartment.
| 10 | "Glass Eye"; Transliteration: "Shikkoku" (Japanese: 漆黒) | March 13, 2012 |
Class 9-3 goes on a trip to the Yomiyama Shrine, where the group listens to the repaired tape. Katsumi had accidentally killed one of the students, and when he discovered no one remembered the student, he realized he had killed the "extra", and thus stopped the curse. Mei reveals that her cousin Fujioka was actually her twin sister, meaning that her death was the first of this year's curse. Mei also says that her doll's eye sees the "color of death", her proof that Kōichi is not the "extra".
| 11 | "Makeup"; Transliteration: "Sangeki" (Japanese: 惨劇) | March 20, 2012 |
Kōichi finds that the manager has been killed, the dining hall is on fire, and the tape has gone missing. Naoya and Yūya are attacked by the hotel mistress, who has gone insane. Takako believes Mei is the "extra one", noticing a difference from the Misaki she knew in elementary, probably Fujioka. Takako, ensuing chaos, broadcasts the tape to the class, prompting everyone to kill Mei. Yumi and Takako die while trying to kill Mei and another student dies by a sudden backdraft.
| 12 | "Stand by Oneself"; Transliteration: "Shisha" (Japanese: 死者) | March 27, 2012 |
Tomohiko is randomly killing students to find the "extra" but is killed by Izumi, who is soon killed by glass shards impaling her, after which she remembers briefly meeting Kōichi in Yomiyama in 1996. Kōichi learns that the "extra" is Reiko, who was actually murdered in 1996. His memories, altered because of the curse, return to him and he remembers he had come to Yomiyama in 1996 for Reiko's funeral. He reluctantly kills her, ending the calamity, but passes out from the shock. Later, Kōichi and Mei reflect on the memories they will soon forget. After the credits, Naoya records a new message for those who may face the calamity in the future.
