= Cocohana =

Japanese manga magazine

- Cover of the January 2012 issue of Cocohana, the first after the name was changed from Chorus; art by Akiko Higashimura
- Editor-In-Chief: Mariko Kono
- Categories: Josei manga
- Frequency: Monthly
- Circulation: 24,667; (July–September 2026)
- First issue: May 28, 1994
- Company: Shueisha
- Country: Japan
- Based in: Tokyo
- Language: Japanese
- Website: cocohana.shueisha.co.jp

Cocohana (Japanese: ココハナ) is a Japanese josei manga magazine published by Shueisha since May 28, 1994. A digital edition of the magazine, published simultaneously with the print version, was launched on May 28, 2021, with the release of the July 2021 issue.

Originally the magazine's name was Chorus, but it changed to Cocohana with the January 2012 issue. Cocohana is published monthly on the 28th. By 2017, it printed 58,000 copies per issue.

== Manga ==
=== Current ===
As of November 2017:

- Bishoku Tantei Akechi Gorou (美食探偵 明智五郎)
- Caramel, Cinnamon, Popcorn (キャラメル シナモン ポップコーン)
- Chikutaku Bonbon (ちくたくぼんぼん)
- Heavenly Kiss (ヘヴンリー・キス)
- Higepiyo (ヒゲぴよ)
- Kishuku no Niwa (鬼宿の庭)
- Kyaria Kogitsune Kin no Machi (キャリア こぎつね きんのまち)
- Mama wa Tenparist (ママはテンパリスト)
- Manpukuji (万福児)
- Moment: Eien no Isshun (モーメント 永遠の一瞬)
- My First One (はじめてのひと)
- Papa Told Me (パパ トールド ミー)
- Shirokuma Café: Today's Special (しろくまカフェ today's special)
- Seigi no Mikata (正義の味方)
- Tanin Kurashi (他人暮らし)
- Yottsu no Kisetsu (よっつの季節)

=== Former ===
- A Gentle Breeze in the Village (天然コケッコー) (Fusako Kuramochi)
- Ashi-Girl (アシガール) (Kozueko Morimoto)
- Azusa Yumi (あづさゆみ) (Nodoka Tsurimaki)
- Blank Canvas: My So-Called Artist's Journey (Akiko Higashimura)
- Bread & Butter (Bread&Butter) (Hinako Ashihara)
- Clover (Toriko Chiya)
- Clover Trèfle (Toriko Chiya)
- Chocolate Junkie (チョコレイト ジャンキー) (Asahi Tsutsui)
- Flower and Balance (花と天秤) (Mao Hashiba)
- Hana Monogatari (花物語) (Nobuko Yoshiya)
- He is my boss. (わたしの上司) (Mimi Tajima)
- Honey and Clover (Chica Umino)
- Jumping (Jumping ジャンピング) (Asahi Tsutsui)
- Kare to Koi nante (彼と恋なんて) (Ao Mimori)
- Kodomo Nanka Daikirai (Kimidori Inoue)
- Kuu Nomu Tokoro ni Taberu Toko (くうのむところにたべるとこ) (Tomoko Yamashita)
- Kyō wa Kaisha Yasumimasu. (きょうは会社休みます。) (Mari Fujimura)
- Marmalade Boy Little (ママレード·ボーイ) (Yoshizumi Wataru)
- Madorokkoshii wo Kimi to (まどろっこしいを君と) (Miu Kouda)
- Nihon Santa Claus Kabushiki-gaisha (日本サンタクロース株式会社)
- Nikoniko Nikki (ニコニコ日記, Niko Niko Nikki) (Mari Ozawa)
- Nimo Kakawarazu (にもかかわらず) (Asahi Tsutsui)
- Nōnai Poison Berry (たまちゃんハウス) (Setona Mizushiro)
- Omoide no Toki Shuurishimasu (思い出のとき修理します) (Mizue Tani)
- Otonanajimi (おとななじみ) (Aya Nakahara)
- Ouhi Margot (王妃マルゴ) (Moto Hagio)
- Pong Pong (PONG☆PONG) (Mari Ozawa)
- Pride (プライド) (Yukari Ichijo)
- Shakunetsu Mermaid (灼熱マーメイド) (Momoko Aikawa)
- Shōjo Manga (Naoko Matsuda)
- Sumika Sumire (スミカスミレ) (Mitsuba Takanashi)
- Suna no Shiru (Yukari Ichijo)
- Tama-chan House (たまちゃんハウス) (Mieko Ōsaka)
- Tomodachi, nanoni (ともだち、なのに) (Megumi Hazuki)
- Tounan Kadobeya (東南角部屋) (Mimi Tajima)
- Yes! (Satoru Makimura)
- You and I on the G string (G線上のあなたと私) (Ryou Ikuemi)

== See also ==
- Young You
- You
