= Akemi Matsunae =

Japanese manga artist

- Born: 18 November 1956 (age 70) Tokyo, Japan
- Area: Manga artist
- Notable works: Junjō Crazy Fruits
- Awards: 1988 Kodansha Manga Award for shōjo manga - Junjō Crazy Fruits

Akemi Matsunae (松苗あけみ, Matsunae Akemi; born 18 November 1956 in Tokyo, Japan) is a Japanese shōjo manga artist.

She made her debut in 1977 with Yakusoku ("Promise") in Lyrica. In 1988, she won the Kodansha Manga Award for shōjo for Junjō Crazy Fruits, which was serialized in the manga magazine Bouquet from 1982 to 1988.

Matsunae is known for her romantic comedies. Rachel Thorn mentions worklife for women, divorce and casual sex as issues that show up in her work.
