= Toriko Chiya =

Japanese manga artist

- Born: August 25; Tokyo, Japan
- Occupation: Manga artist
- Known for: Clover, Tokyo Alice

Toriko Chiya (Japanese: 稚野鳥子, Hepburn: Chiya Toriko; born August 25 in Tokyo) is a Japanese manga artist. She is best known for Clover as well as Tokyo Alice.

== Works ==
- Danchi Kaidan Kaidan (団地階段会談)
  (1990, Bouquet, Shueisha, 1 volume)
- Bara-gara no Hoshī Toshigoro (薔薇柄の欲しい年頃)
  (1991, Bouquet, Shueisha, 2 volumes)
- Miracle
  (1992–1993, Bouquet, Shueisha, 4 volumes)
- Watashi no Ichiban Sukina Hito (わたしの一番好きな人)
  (1993, Bouquet, Shueisha, 1 volume)
- Angel ni Kiite (天使（エンジェル）に聞いて, Enjeru ni Kiite)
  (1993–1994, Bouquet, Shueisha, 4 volumes)
- Tengoku no Hana (天国の花)
  (1994–1996, Bouquet, Shueisha, 6 volumes)
- Clover (クローバー, Kurōbā)
  (1997–2010, Bouquet→Cookie→Chorus, Shueisha, 24 volumes)
- Tokyo Alice (東京アリス, Tōkyō Arisu)
  (2005–2015, Kiss, Kodansha, 15 volumes)
- Kazoku Switch (家族スイッチ, Kazoku Suitchi)
  (2010–2012, Chorus→Cocohana, Shueisha, 4 volumes)
- Clover trèfle (クローバー trefle(トレフル), Kurōbā Torefuru)
  (2012–ongoing, Cocohana, Shueisha, 8 volumes)
- Tsuki to Yubisaki no Aida (月と指先の間)
  (2015–ongoing, Kiss, Kodansha, 3 volumes)
