= Takeshi Furusawa =

Japanese film director and screenwriter

- Born: 22 October 1972 (age 53)
- Occupation: Film director
- Years active: 2004-present

Takeshi Furusawa (古澤健, Furusawa Takeshi; born 22 October 1972) is a Japanese film director and screenwriter.

== Career ==
Furusawa began making 8mm films in college, and won the scriptwriting award for his film home sweet movie at the 1997 Pia Film Festival. He enrolled at the Film School of Tokyo in 1997. After graduating, he worked as a director's assistant for Kiyoshi Kurosawa, Shinji Aoyama, and Takahisa Zeze, and penned the scripts for Zeze's Chōgokudō and Kurosawa's Doppelganger. He made his major feature length directorial debut with Ghost Train in 2006.

== Selected filmography ==
Year	Title	Notes
2006	Ghost Train	
2010	making of LOVE	
2012	Another	
2013	Roommate	
2014	Clover	
2017	ReLIFE	
2017	Love and Lies	
2018	Ao-Natsu	
2018	Run! T High School Basketball Club	
2018	Blue Summer	
