= Yukari Fujimoto =

Japanese academic

- 藤本由香里
- Born: August 13, 1959 (age 67); Kumamoto Prefecture
- Education: Tokyo University
- Occupations: Professor; Manga critic Author

Yukari Fujimoto (藤本 由香里, Fujimoto Yukari) is a manga researcher and professor of global Japanese studies at Meiji University. She was born in Kumamoto Prefecture. She was an editor for Chikuma Shobō. She is a manga critic, gender theorist, author, and liberal feminist. She is a member of the Agency for Cultural Affairs awards selection committee. She is also a member of the Japanese National Diet Library legal deposit deliberation committee.

== History ==
She graduated from Kumamoto City Toen Junior High School, Kumamoto Prefectural Kumamoto High School, and Tokyo University. She then went to work for the book publishing company Chikuma Shobō.

She teaches at Meiji Gakuin University, working on publications related to gender in manga. She was present for the formation of the Japan Society for Studies in Cartoon and Comics and also a member on the board of directors.

== Bibliography ==
- (1998) Watashi no Ibasho wa Doko ni Aru no? Shōjo Manga ga Utsusu Kokoro no Katachi (私の居場所はどこにあるの? 少女マンガが映す心のかたち)
  - Fujimoto, Yukari (2014). "Where Is My Place in the World?: Early Shōjo Manga Portrayals of Lesbianism". Mechademia. 9 (1). Translated by Fraser, Lucy: 25–42. doi:10.1353/mec.2014.0007. S2CID 122076678.
- (1999) Kairaku Denryū Onna no, Yokubō, no Katachi (快楽電流 女の、欲望の、かたち Electric Currents of Pleasure The Shape of a Woman's Desire)
- (2000) Shōjo Manga Damashī Genzai o Utsusu Shōjo Manga Kanzen Gaido&Interview Collection (少女まんが魂 現在を映す少女まんが完全ガイド&インタビュー集)
- (2004) Aijou Hyōron 「Kazoku」 o Meguru Monogatari (愛情評論 「家族」をめぐる物語)
- (2013) Kiwakiwa 「Itami」 o Meguru Monogatari (きわきわ 「痛み」をめぐる物語)
- Fujimoto, Yukari (2012). "Takahashi Macoto: The Origin of Shōjo Manga Style". Mechademia. 7 (1). Translated by Thorn, Rachel: 24–55. doi:10.5749/minnesota/9780816680498.003.0002. ISBN 9780816680498.
