= Yukari Ichijo =

Japanese manga artist

Yukari Ichijo 一条ゆかり
- Born: September 19, 1949 (age 77) Tamano, Okayama Prefecture, Japan
- Area: Manga artist
- Notable works: Yūkan Club, Pride
- Awards: Kodansha Manga Award for shōjo - Yūkan Club; Japan Media Arts Festival Excellence Prize - Pride

Yukari Ichijo (一条ゆかり, Ichijō Yukari; born 19 September 1949 in Okayama Prefecture, Japan) is a Japanese shōjo and josei manga artist.

She made her debut as a professional manga artist in 1968 with Yuki no Serenade. In 1986 she received the Kodansha Manga Award for shōjo for Yūkan Club, and in 2007, she received an Excellence Prize in manga at the Japan Media Arts Festival for Pride. Several of her series have been dramatized, including Yūkan Club as an anime OVA and Designer and Tadashii Ren'ai no Susume as high-rated live-action television dramas. A live-action film based on her work Pride was released in 2009.

Yoshimi Uchida worked for her as an assistant in the 1970s.

== Selected works ==
- Suna no Shiro (砂の城; lit. 'Sand Castles') is a manga series serialized in Ribon between July 1977 through July 1979 and September 1980 through November 1981. A TV adaptation was created as an afternoon series by Tōkai Television and Fuji and aired from July 30, 1997, through October 3, 1997.
