= 32nd Yokohama Film Festival =

2011 film festival in Yokohama, Japan

- Location: Yokohama, Kanagawa, Japan
- Founded: 1980
- Festival date: 2011

The 32nd Yokohama Film Festival (第32回ヨコハマ映画祭) was held in 2011 in Yokohama, Kanagawa, Japan.

== Awards ==
- Best Film: 13 Assassins
- Best Director: Takashi Miike - 13 Assassins, Zebraman 2: Attack on Zebra City
- Best New Director:
  - Yuya Ishii - Sawako Decides, To Walk Beside You
  - Masaaki Taniguchi - Time Traveller: The Girl Who Leapt Through Time
- Best Screenplay: Daisuke Tengan - 13 Assassins
- Best Cinematographer: Jun Fukumoto - A Good Husband, Parade
- Best Actor: Etsushi Toyokawa - A Good Husband, Sword of Desperation
- Best Actress: Hikari Mitsushima - Sawako Decides, Kakera: A Piece of Our Life
- Best Supporting Actor: Renji Ishibashi - A Good Husband, Parade, Strangers in the City, Outrage, Fallen Angel
- Best Supporting Actress: Yui Natsukawa - The Lone Scalpel
- Best Newcomer:
  - Osamu Mukai - BECK, Hanamizuki
  - Hiroko Sato - A Night in Nude: Salvation
- Special Grand Prize: Hiroki Matsukata

== Best 10 ==
1. 13 Assassins
2. Confessions
3. Villain
4. Sawako Decides
5. A Good Husband
6. Sword of Desperation
7. The Lone Scalpel
8. A Night in Nude: Salvation
9. Permanent Nobara
10. Time Traveller: The Girl Who Leapt Through Time

runner-up: Haru's Journey
