= One Piece season 3 =

One Piece
- Season 3 Introducing Chopper at the Winter Island
- The Log Collection home media cover art for Chopper, which released on December 22, 2010
- No. of episodes: 15

Release
- Original network: Fuji Television
- Original release: August 26 – December 9, 2001

Season chronology
- ← Previous; Season 2 Next → Season 4

The third season of the One Piece anime television series, subtitled Enter Chopper at the Winter Island on home video, aired from August 26, 2001, to December 9, 2001, on Fuji Television. Directed by Konosuke Uda and produced by Toei Animation, it adapts the 15th to 18th volume of Eiichiro Oda's manga. It depicts the adventures of Monkey D. Luffy and the Straw Hat Pirates as they attempt to find a doctor after Nami falls sick. They sail to Drum Island where they face off against the Wapol Pirates while Nami receives treatment from Kureha; they recruit Tony Tony Chopper, Kureha's assistant as their doctor.

In North America and other territories, it was first licensed by 4Kids Entertainment and dubbed as part of a heavily edited localization. The total number of episodes was reduced due to some 4Kids episodes covering multiple Japanese ones. This version aired on August 27 though November 12, 2005, on the Fox Broadcasting Company and February 11 through February 18, 2006, on Cartoon Network, consisting of only twelve episodes. After 4Kids lost the license it was acquired by Funimation, who released the season on home video in 2009. This uncensored release contained a new English dub and the Japanese version with subtitles.

Three pieces of theme music are utilized by the season's episodes (one less than before): one opening theme and two ending themes. The opening theme is "Believe" by Folder5 in Japanese and Meredith McCoy in English. The ending themes are "Shouchi no Suke" (しょうちのすけ; lit. That's a Fact!) by Shōjo Suitei in Japanese and Stephanie Young in English for the first 4 episodes and "Before Dawn" by Ai-Sachi in Japanese and Leah Clark in English for the remainder of the season. The 4Kids dub uses Russell Velasquez' "Pirate Rap V2" as opening for the whole season, except for the final episode, which uses his "Pirate Rap V3", and "Pirate Rap Instrumental" as ending theme.

== Episodes ==
Orig.	4Kids	No. in season	4Kids title/Funimation title Original Japanese title	Directed by	Written by	Animation directed by	Original release date	English air date
Drum Island
78	48a	1	"Saving Nami" "Nami's Sick? Beyond the Snow Falling on the Sea!"; Transliteration: "Nami ga byōki? Umi ni furu yuki no mukō ni!" (Japanese: ナミが病気?海に降る雪の向こうに!)	Yoshihiro Ueda	Junki Takegami	Noboru Koizumi	August 26, 2001	August 27, 2005
Nami is sick, but the crew doesn't have a doctor to help her and Luffy, Usopp and Sanji enters in panic.
79	48b	2	"Saving Nami" "A Raid! The Tin Tyrant and Tin Plate Wapol!"; Transliteration: "Kishū! Burikingu gō to Buriki no Waporu" (Japanese: 奇襲!ブリキング号とブリキのワポル)	Junji Shimizu	Junki Takegami	Eisaku Inoue	September 2, 2001	August 27, 2005
While looking for a doctor, the crew meets the pirate Wapol, who attacks them while trying to eat their ship with his Munch-Munch Fruit power, but only makes Luffy send him flying. Meanwhile Smoker manages to intercept the conversation between Mr. 0 and Sanji and plans to go to Alabasta. Back with the crew they arrive at last to an island only to find out they're not welcome.
80	48c 49a	3	"Saving Nami"/"Rabid Rabbits" "An Island without Doctors? Adventure in a Nameless Land!"; Transliteration: "Isha no inai shima? Na mo naki kuni no bōken" (Japanese: 医者のいない島?名も無き国の冒険!)	Munehisa Sakai	Michiru Shimada	Yūji Hakamada	September 9, 2001	August 27, 2005
80	48c 49a	3	"Saving Nami"/"Rabid Rabbits" "An Island without Doctors? Adventure in a Nameless Land!"; Transliteration: "Isha no inai shima? Na mo naki kuni no bōken" (Japanese: 医者のいない島?名も無き国の冒険!)	Munehisa Sakai	Michiru Shimada	Yūji Hakamada	September 9, 2001	September 10, 2005
The Straw Hat crew manages to gain the trust of the people that attacked them, and are taken to the village, except for Zoro and Carue, who guard the ship. Luffy and Sanji must take Nami to the island's sole doctor who lives on a mountain-top. Vivi and Usopp discover the past of the island, and about the pirate Wapol from Dalton.
81	49b 50a	4	"Rabid Rabbits"/"Avalanche!" "Are You Happy? The Doctor Called Witch!"; Transliteration: "Happī kai? Majo to yobareta isha!" (Japanese: ハッピーかい?魔女と呼ばれた医者!)	Kōnosuke Uda	Michiru Shimada	Hideaki Maniwa	September 16, 2001	September 10, 2005
81	49b 50a	4	"Rabid Rabbits"/"Avalanche!" "Are You Happy? The Doctor Called Witch!"; Transliteration: "Happī kai? Majo to yobareta isha!" (Japanese: ハッピーかい?魔女と呼ばれた医者!)	Kōnosuke Uda	Michiru Shimada	Hideaki Maniwa	September 16, 2001	September 17, 2005
While Sanji and Luffy fight off the wilderness, the islander's worst nightmare turns true, as Wapol returns to the island. Dalton turns into a bison with his Zoan type Ox-Ox Fruit: Model Bison powers to confront him. The doctor is discovered to be on the other side of the island, and Usopp, Vivi and Dalton rush to find her. Dalton however returns as he hears of Wapol's return.
82	50b	5	"Avalanche!" "Dalton's Resolve! Wapol's Corps Lands on the Island!"; Transliteration: "Doruton no kakugo! Waporu gundan shima ni jōriku" (Japanese: ドルトンの覚悟!ワポル軍団島に上陸)	Harume Kosaka	Michiru Shimada	Kenji Yokoyama	October 7, 2001 (Note: In Japan, episodes 82 and 83 aired as part of a special alongside an episode of Kochikame.)	September 17, 2005
Dalton faces Wapol, but only gets himself hit by arrows thrown by his former comrade Chess. An avalanche stops the battle, but injures Sanji. Luffy must carry both Nami and Sanji to the doctor, and begins his ascent.
83	51	6	"The Big Climb" "The Island Where Snow Lives! Climb the Drum Rockies!"; Transliteration: "Yuki no sumi shima! Doramu Rokkī o nobore!" (Japanese: 雪の住む島!ドラムロッキーを登れ!)	Hidehiko Kadota	Michiru Shimada	Masayuki Takagi	October 7, 2001	September 24, 2005
The Lapahn help Luffy escape from Wapol, giving him enough time to climb to the castle where doctor Kureha lives. Vivi, Usopp and Zoro deal with the king's army in order to save Dalton. The recovering Nami meets a strange creature.
84	52	7	"Tony Tony Chopper" "Blue-nosed Reindeer! Chopper's Secret!"; Transliteration: "Tonakai wa aoppana! Choppā no himitsu!" (Japanese: トナカイは青っ鼻!チョッパーの秘密)	Daisuke Nishio	Michiru Shimada	Kazuya Hisada	October 21, 2001	October 1, 2005
Nami asks Tony Tony Chopper to join the crew, but he isn't interested. Kureha tells Nami that Chopper is a reindeer who ate the Human-Human Fruit and some of what was his background. After realizing the abilities that Chopper has, Luffy is eager to make him join the crew.
85	53	8	"Freaky" "An Outcast's Dream! Hiriluk the Quack!"; Transliteration: "Hamidashimono no yume! Yabu isha Hiruruku!" (Japanese: はみだし者の夢!やぶ医者ヒルルク!)	Yoshihiro Ueda	Michiru Shimada	Noboru Koizumi	October 28, 2001	October 8, 2005
Kureha continues to tell how Chopper lived his life and how the quack doctor Hiruluk took care of him.
86	54	9	"The Impossible Dream" "Hiriluk's Cherry Blossoms and the Will that Gets Carried On!"; Transliteration: "Hiruruku no sakura to uketsugare yuku ishi!" (Japanese: ヒルルクの桜と受け継がれゆく意志!)	Kōnosuke Uda	Michiru Shimada	Eisaku Inoue	November 4, 2001	October 15, 2005
More of Chopper's past is revealed, including the fate of doctor Hiruluk and Wapol's cruelties as the king. Meanwhile, Wapol reaches the castle where the crew is residing.
87	55	10	"Defending the Flag" "Fight Wapol's Crew! The Power of the Munch Munch Fruit!"; Transliteration: "VS Waporu gundan! Bakubaku no mi no nōryoku!" (Japanese: VSワポル軍団!バクバクの実の能力!)	Junji Shimizu	Michiru Shimada	Takeo Ide	November 11, 2001	October 22, 2005
Wapol is determined to bring down Hiruluk's flag, and to do that, he engages Sanji, Luffy and Chopper in a fight.
88	56	11	"Let's Get Ready to Rumble" "Zoan-type Devil Fruit! Chopper's Seven-form Transformation!"; Transliteration: "Zōn kei akuma no mi! Choppā Shichidan Hengei" (Japanese: 動物系悪魔の実!チョッパー七段変形)	Hidehiko Kadota	Michiru Shimada	Hideaki Maniwa	November 18, 2001	October 29, 2005
Chopper demonstrates the abilities of Rumble Balls when fighting Chessmarimo. Dalton is uncovered from the avalanche.
89	57	12	"The Once & Future King" "When the Kingdom's Rule Ends! The Flag of Faith Flies Forever!"; Transliteration: "Ōkoku no shihai owaru toki! Shinnen no hata wa eien ni" (Japanese: 王国の支配終る時!信念の旗は永遠に)	Jun'ichi Fujise	Michiru Shimada	Kenji Yokoyama	November 25, 2001	November 5, 2005
After trying every trick in the castle, Wapol is finally hunted down by Luffy. The villagers along with Zoro, Vivi and Usopp start their ascent to the castle through a ropeway.
90	58	13	"Doc Rock" "Hiriluk's Cherry Blossoms! Miracle in the Drum Rockies!"; Transliteration: "Hiruruku no sakura! Doramu Rokkī no kiseki" (Japanese: ヒルルクの桜!ドラムロッキーの奇跡)	Munehisa Sakai	Michiru Shimada	Masayuki Takagi	December 2, 2001	November 12, 2005
After finally being convinced to join the team, Chopper announces his intentions to Dr. Kureha, who doesn't take it too well; but after escaping from the castle, she has decided to give the whole Straw Hat crew a farewell gift.
91	59	14	"Heading For Disaster" "Goodbye Drum Island! I'm Going Out to Sea!"; Transliteration: "Sayōnara Doramujima! Boku wa umi e deru!" (Japanese: さようならドラム島!僕は海へ出る!)	Harume Kosaka	Michiru Shimada	Kazuya Hisada	December 9, 2001	February 11, 2006
Chopper joins the Straw Hat crew as they continue their journey to Vivi's homeland.
92	60	15	"Face Off" "Alabasta's Hero and a Ballerina on the Ship!"; Transliteration: "Arabasuta no eiyū to senjō no barerīna" (Japanese: アラバスタの英雄と船上のバレリーナ)	Yūji Endō	Junki Takegami	Noboru Koizumi	December 9, 2001	February 18, 2006
Crocodile appears to stop rampaging pirates. Luffy and his crew meet Mr. 2 (Bon Clay) who shows off his Copy-Copy Fruit power and Vivi sees a shocking sight.

== Home media release ==
=== Japanese ===
==== VHS ====
Avex Mode/Toei Video (Japan, VHS)
Volume		Episodes	Release date	Ref.
チョッパー登場冬島篇	piece1	78–80	September 4, 2002	
チョッパー登場冬島篇	piece2	81–83	October 2, 2002	
チョッパー登場冬島篇	piece3	84–86	November 7, 2002	
チョッパー登場冬島篇	piece4	87–89	December 4, 2002	
チョッパー登場冬島篇	piece5	90–92	January 8, 2003	

==== DVD ====
Avex Mode (Japan, Region 2 DVD)
Volume		Episodes	Release date	Ref.
3rdシーズン チョッパー登場 冬島篇	piece.01	78–80	September 4, 2002	
3rdシーズン チョッパー登場 冬島篇	piece.02	81–83	October 2, 2002	
3rdシーズン チョッパー登場 冬島篇	piece.03	84–86	November 7, 2002	
3rdシーズン チョッパー登場 冬島篇	piece.04	87–89	December 4, 2002	
3rdシーズン チョッパー登場 冬島篇	piece.05	90–92	January 8, 2003	
ONE PIECE Log Collection	"CHOPPER"	78–92	December 22, 2010	
ONE PIECE Log Collection SET	EAST BLUE to CHOPPER	1–92	March 27, 2015	

==== Blu-ray ====
The Eternal Log contains 16:9 versions of the episodes in standard definition Blu-ray format.

Avex Pictures (Japan, Region A BD)
Volume		Episodes	Release date	Ref.
ONE PIECE Eternal Log	ARABASTA	62–130	July 23, 2021	

=== English ===
==== 4Kids ====
4Kids Entertainment Edited TV Version: Viz Media (USA, Region 1 DVD), Madman Entertainment (Australia, Region 4)
Volume	Episodes	Release date		ISBN	Ref.
Volume	Episodes	USA	Australia	ISBN	Ref.
Volume 11: Tony Tony Chopper	47–52	October 30, 2007	January 23, 2008	ISBN 1-59861-010-4	

==== Uncut ====
Uncut English & Japanese versions: Funimation Entertainment (USA, Region 1), Manga Entertainment (UK, Region 2), Madman Entertainment (Australia, Region 4)
Volume		Episodes	Release date			ISBN	Ref.
Volume		Episodes	USA	UK	Australia	ISBN	Ref.
Season Two	Second Voyage	67–78	August 25, 2009	N/A	February 16, 2011	ISBN 1-4210-1889-6	
Season Two	Third Voyage	79–91	September 29, 2009	N/A	March 16, 2011	ISBN 1-4210-1890-X	
Season Two	Fourth Voyage	92–103	December 15, 2009	N/A	October 24, 2012	ISBN 1-4210-1891-8	
Collections	Collection 3	54–78	November 29, 2011	September 23, 2013	N/A	ISBN 1-4210-2405-5	
Collections	Collection 4	79–103	January 31, 2012	November 11, 2013	N/A	ISBN 1-4210-2447-0	
Treasure Chest Collection	One	1–103	N/A		October 24, 2012	ISBN N/A	
Voyage Collection	Two	54-103	N/A		September 6, 2017	ISBN N/A	
