= One Piece season 2 =

One Piece
- Season 2 Entering into the Grand Line
- The Log Collection home media cover art for Grand Line, which released on December 22, 2010
- No. of episodes: 16

Release
- Original network: Fuji Television
- Original release: March 21 – August 19, 2001

Season chronology
- ← Previous; Season 1 Next → Season 3

The second season of the One Piece anime television series aired on Fuji Television in Japan from March 21, 2001, to August 19, 2001, totaling 16 episodes. Directed by Kōnosuke Uda and produced by Toei Animation, it adapts Eiichiro Oda's One Piece manga from shortly after the beginning of the 12th through the beginning of the 15th volumes over 15 episodes. (Note: This list uses the season divisions as given by the animation guidebook One Piece: Rainbow.) It is nicknamed "Gurando Rain Totsunyū" (グランドライン突入, lit. "Enter the Grand Line"), as the first season in the Arabasta Saga. It documents the first adventures of Monkey D. Luffy's Straw Hat Pirates in the Grand Line. Stuck in the bowels of the giant whale Laboon, they encounter the whale's caretaker, an old man named Crocus, and Nefeltari Vivi. Taking her with them, they make enemies of the Warlord Sir Crocodile's secret organization, Baroque Works, while befriending the giants Dorry and Broggy on the prehistoric island Little Garden.

In Video Research's audience measurements in the Kantō region, these initial airings received household ratings ranging from 12.5 to 17.2, which earned every episode a place in Video Research's weekly Top 10 ranking of anime shows. Avex Entertainment released the season's episodes on VHS in five compilations, (Note: Avex Entertainment's VHS release of the second season additionally includes episode 62. Each compilation release contains one cassette with three or four episodes, between April 3 and August 7, 2002) and on DVD in six compilations, (Note: Avex Entertainment's DVD release of the second season additionally includes episode 62, but excludes episode 77, which was released on the first DVD release of the third season.) each containing three episodes, between April 3 and September 4, 2002. In the English language adaptation of the series by former licensee 4Kids Entertainment, the season's 16 episodes were cut down to a mere four. They were first aired from July 30 though August 20, 2005 by the Fox Broadcasting Company as part of its FoxBox programing block. The series' new licensee, Funimation, released the season's episodes as part of their fifth and sixth uncut DVD compilations on June 30 and August 25, 2009.

Toei Animation's version makes use of four pieces of theme music (same amount from the previous season): one opening theme and three ending themes. The opening theme is "Believe" by Folder5 in Japanese and Meredith McCoy in English. The ending themes are "Run! Run! Run!" by Maki Otsuki in Japanese and Caitlin Glass in English for the first two episodes of the season, "Watashi ga Iru Yo" (私がいるよ, lit. "I Am Right Here!") by Tomato Cube in Japanese and Leah Clark in English was used from the third episode to episode 12 and "Shouchi no Suke" (しょうちのすけ, lit. "That's a Fact!") by Shōjo Suitei in Japanese and Stephanie Young in English for the last four episodes of the season. 4Kids Entertainment used original theme music in their adaptation, while Funimation Entertainment opted for English language versions of the theme music pieces used by Toei Animation.

== Episodes ==
Orig.	4Kids	No. in season	4Kids title Original Japanese & Funimation titles	Directed by	Written by	Animation directed by	Original release date	English air date	Rank Rating (Note: Rank of the episode in Video Research's weekly, household-rating-based ranking of anime shows. The figures of the rank and rating column are taken from the same sources as the respective episode's original airdate.)
Reverse Mountain
62	44b	1	"Fantastic Voyage" "The First Line of Defence? The Giant Whale Laboon Appears!"; Transliteration: "Sasho no Toride? Kyodai Kujira Rabūn Arawareru" (Japanese: 最初の砦?巨大クジラ·ラブーン現る)	Kōnosuke Uda	Michiru Shimada	Masayuki Takagi	March 14, 2001 (Note: Episodes 62 and 63 aired together as a television special.)	July 30, 2005	6; 13.7
As the Straw Hats ride down Reverse Mountain into the Grand Line, a huge whale appears in front of them. With the helm still broken, they are about to crash into it, but Luffy fires a cannon, sufficiently slowing the ship, just breaking Luffy's beloved seat, the ship's sheep figurehead. Fully infuriated, Luffy punches the whale directly in the eye, much to Zoro, Sanji and Ussop's rage and Nami's shining tears. The whale swallows the Straw Hats and their ship. Only Luffy falls overboard and gets on the whale. The whale submerges. In the last second, Luffy notices a door on top of the whale. While Luffy winds up in some sort of passageway, his crew finds itself in front of a small island in the middle of green waters, with a clear blue-sky overhead. There they encounter Crocus, the whale's caretaker, who painted the inside of its stomach to look like the sky. Suddenly everything starts to shake as Laboon—which is the name of the whale—rams its head against the Red Line. Crocus leaves to give Laboon a sedative. Meanwhile, Luffy and two individuals, crash into the whale's stomach. As Crocus returns, they shot two cannonballs from their bazookas, to rip a hole in the whale's stomach, but Crocus takes the cannonballs with his own body. Then Luffy knocks them both out. Leading the Straw Hats out of the whale, Crocus explains that Laboon is a whale with a heart like a person, who has been waiting for a certain group of pirates for fifty years. (Note: In the 4Kids version of this episode, the Straw Hats encounter an iceberg in place of Laboon and destroy it with the Going Merry's cannon.)
63	-	2	"A Promise Between Men! Luffy and the Whale Vow to Meet Again!"; Transliteration: "Otoko no Yakusoku! Rufi to Kujira Saikai no Chikai" (Japanese: 男の約束! ルフィとクジラ再会の誓い)	Harume Kosaka	Michiru Shimada	Kazuya Hisada	March 21, 2001	—	6; 13.7
While guiding them out of the giant whale Laboon, its caretaker, Crocus, tells the whale's story to the Straw Hats, that it was left behind by a group of pirates when they began their journey through the Grand Line and abandoned when they fled through one of the calm belts and that once he told Laboon what had happened, the whale started ramming its head against the Red Line, not believing what Crocus said because that would mean losing its reason to wait. After hearing that, Luffy picks a fight with the whale, breaks it off and declares it to be a draw. Then he promises to return to finish the fight and decided the winner. Nami tries to plot a course, but much to his feared shout, is unable to do so because her compass does not point in a single direction. Crocus explains how the Grand Line is navigated and that a log pose is needed. In return for helping Laboon, he gives them a log pose and the Straw Hats set sail for Whiskey Peak, the home town of Mr. 9 and Miss Wednesday, whom they are taking along. While watching them leave, Crocus reveals he actually knew Gold Roger. (Note: As 4Kids skipped this episode, Fantasic Voyage has Usopp find the Log Pose, recognizing it as a gift Yasopp gave him as a child, just before entering Reverse Mountain; Crocus's explanation of Grand Line navigation is said by Zeff to Sanji via flashback.)
Whiskey Peak
64	44c	3	"Fantasic Voyage" "A Town That Welcomes Pirates? Setting Foot on Whiskey Peak!"; Transliteration: "Kaizoku Kangei no Machi? Uisukīpīku Jōriku" (Japanese: 海賊歓迎の町? ウイスキーピーク上陸)	Directed by : Yōko Ikeda; Storyboarded by : Kenji Yokoyama	Michiru Shimada	Kazuo Takigawa	April 15, 2001 (Note: Episodes 64 and 65 aired together as a television special.)	July 30, 2005	2; 17.2
The weather changes rapidly on the first leg of their journey, from Reverse Mountain to Whiskey Peak. Nami has to adjust to the thought of having to watch the log pose constantly. While the rest of the crew and their passengers work hard to keep the ship afloat, Zoro just sits on deck, sleeping. As they arrive at their destination, the townspeople greet them warmly and throw a party in their honor. When eventually the crew falls asleep from exhaustion, the townspeople, who are really bounty hunters of the secret organization Baroque Works, plan on capturing them. However, Zoro only faked falling asleep and takes on the group of roughly one hundred hunters on his own. (Note: As 4Kids removed the Laboon storyline, their version cuts all footage of Mr. 9 and Miss Wednesday prior to the Straw Hats' arrival at Whiskey Peak.)
65	45	4	"Baroque Works" "Explosion! The Three Swords Style! Zoro vs. Baroque Works!"; Transliteration: "Sakuretsu Santōryū! Zoro tai Barokku Wākusu" (Japanese: 炸裂三刀流! ゾロVSバロックワークス)	Yoshihiro Ueda	Michiru Shimada	Tadayoshi Yamamuro	April 15, 2001	August 6, 2005	2; 17.2
Nami who faked falling asleep as well, searches the town for the bounty hunters' treasures. Meanwhile, Zoro lets loose on the bounty hunters the two new swords he received in Lougetown, Yubashiri and Sandai Kitetsu. After he defeats all of them, including the frontier agents Mr. 9, Miss Wednesday, Mr. 8, and Miss Monday, a new threat arrives, the Baroque Works officer agents Mr. 5 and Miss Valentine. Their mission is to eliminate two traitors, who know the true identity of the organization's boss, Mr. 0. They reveal them to be Mr. 8, who is really Igaram, captain of the royal army of the Kingdom of Alabasta, and Miss Wednesday, who is actually Alabasta's crown princess, Nefertari Vivi.
66	46	5	"Luffy vs. Zoro" "All Out Battle! Luffy vs. Zoro! Mysterious Grand Duel!"; Transliteration: "Shinken Shōbu! Rufi tai Zoro Nazo no Dai Kettō" (Japanese: 真剣勝負! ルフィVSゾロ謎の大決闘!)	Hidehiko Kadota	Michiru Shimada	Yūji Hakamada	April 22, 2001	August 13, 2005	5 (Note: Episode 66 shared a fifth place with an episode of Inuyasha.); 14.1
Mr. 5 and Miss Valentine follow after Vivi, who attempts to flee the island. Mr. 9 despite learning Vivi's a traitor tries to protect her but is beaten. Igaram, no longer able to fight himself, begs Zoro to save her, but Zoro refuses. As the Alabastan soldier promises a handsome reward, Nami chimes in. She first extorts Igaram to raise the amount, then she extorts Zoro to save the princess. Miss Monday also decides to try and protect Vivi, but is quickly beaten by Mr. 5's Bomb-Bomb Fruit powers that allow him to create explosions from any part of his body, and Miss Valentine's Kilo-Kilo Fruit powers which allow to change her weight from one to ten thousand kilograms. When Zoro is about to take on Vivi's assailants, Luffy appears. Oblivious to the townsfolk's occupation as bounty hunters, he wants to fight Zoro for cutting them all up. Unable to convince Luffy about the truth, Zoro fights him. The officer agents attempt to get past the fighting crewmates, but are caught up in the struggle and easily defeated.
67	47a	6	"Escape From Misty Peak" "Deliver Princess Vivi! The Luffy Pirates Set Sail!"; Transliteration: "Ōjo Bibi o Todokero! Rufi Kaizoku Dan Shukkō" (Japanese: 王女ビビを届けろ! ルフィ海賊団出航)	Kōnosuke Uda	Michiru Shimada	Hideaki Maniwa	April 29, 2001	August 20, 2005	4; 15.0
Luffy and Zoro are about to go all out, when Nami arrives and violently ends their duel. Out of imminent danger, Vivi explains that Baroque Works is responsible for inciting a rebellion in her home country, which is why she cannot offer a large reward, and reveals that Mr. 0's true identity is Sir Crocodile, one of the Seven Warlords of the Sea. Unfortunately, two Baroque Works spies see this and capture pictures of Luffy, Zoro and Nami, making them Baroque Works top targets. Nevertheless, Luffy agrees to take her with them. Igaram sets out on the direct route to Alabasta, as a decoy. As he clears the coast, his ship is engulfed in an explosion. The Straw Hats and Vivi hurry to their ship and set sail, following the log towards Little Garden. Miss All-Sunday, the partner of Mr. 0, appears on their ship. Without explaining her reasons, she offers the crew an eternal pose. However, Luffy crushes it much to Nami's rage and the agent leaves them.
Diary of Coby-Meppo
68	—	7	"Try Hard, Coby! Coby and Helmeppo's Struggles in the Marines!"; Transliteration: "Ganbare Kobī! Kobimeppo Kaigun Funtōki" (Japanese: 頑張れコビー! コビメッポ海軍奮闘記)	Harume Kosaka	Michiru Shimada	Kenji Yokoyama	May 13, 2001	—	3; 14.6
Coby and Helmeppo have enlisted into the navy as oddjobbers. Coby works hard towards his goal of becoming an officer. They get into an argument about whether it is possible, which escalates into a struggle, during which they accidentally fire a cannon, destroying a whole building. Later they are taken along on a trip to turn over Helmeppo's father, the former navy captain, "Axe-Hand" Morgan, to Vice-Admiral Garp to stand trial for his crimes. While receiving the prisoner, Garp falls asleep. Morgan slashes the admiral's chest, takes Helmeppo hostage, and, stealing a boat, makes a run for his life. The marines are about to fire at them when Coby steps in front of the cannon. He pleads for his friend's life and jumps into the water to swim after them. Impressed with Coby risking dismissal from the navy and thus his dream, Helmeppo stands up to his father. Coby arrives and they fight him together. Eventually Morgan throws them overboard. Garp, who witnessed their struggle decides to take them with him to the navy headquarters.
69	—	8	"Coby and Helmeppo's Resolve! Vice-Admiral Garp's Parental Affection!"; Transliteration: "Kobimeppo no Ketsui! Gāpu Chūshō no Oyagokoro" (Japanese: コビメッポの決意! ガープ中将の親心)	Munehisa Sakai	Michiru Shimada	Masayuki Takagi	May 20, 2001	—	3; 15.8
Coby and Helmeppo settle in at headquarters, where Garp makes sure that they are not slacking off. After working hard during the day, they fall tired to their beds, but Helmeppo decides that he wants to do more, to regain his former lifestyle. Coby, whose determination had wavered, joins him. Starting then, they spend their nights steeling their bodies and training the martial arts. Eventually, Garp overhears that they are friends with "Straw Hat" Luffy, who was recently added to the wanted list, and puts their determination to the test by letting them fight him. Though he is disappointed by their weakness, he decides to keep their friendship with Luffy a secret, allowing them to stay.
Little Garden
70	—	9	"An Ancient Island! The Shadow Hiding in Little Garden!"; Transliteration: "Taiko no Shima! Ritoru Gāden ni Hisomu Kage!" (Japanese: 太古の島! リトルガーデンに潜む影!)	Yūji Endō	Junki Takegami	Kazuya Hisada	May 27, 2001	—	6; 13.1
As the Straw Hats sail toward Little Garden, the Baroque Works officer agents Mr. 3 and his partner Miss Golden Week receive new orders. Finally arriving there, the Straw Hats find the island to be populated by oversized and from pre-historic times stemming animals. Frightened, Nami and Usopp stay behind on the ship as the others spread out to search the island for food and adventure. Nami remembers having read about the island in a book, but by the time she finds it, it is already too late. A giant approaches through the forest.
71	—	10	"Huge Duel! The Giants Dorry and Broggy!"; Transliteration: "Dekkai Kettō! Kyojin Dorī to Burogī" (Japanese: でっかい決闘! 巨人ドリーとブロギー)	Hidehiko Kadota	Junki Takegami	Takeo Ide	June 3, 2001	—	3; 14.7
The giant introduces himself as Broggy, claiming to be the strongest warrior of Elbaf, and asks Nami and Usopp for booze. Frightened, the two play dead. Broggy takes them to his place, where he roasts dinosaur meat to treat them as his guests. They however, fearing to be eaten themselves, try to escape through the jungle, but, after being chased by large predators, they end up back at Broggy's camp. Elsewhere, Luffy and Vivi meet Dorry, another giant and Broggy's rival, who tells them that they are engaged in a one hundred years long duel. Whenever the island's central volcano erupts, the two face each other in combat. Meanwhile in the jungle, the Mr. 5 pair joins forces with Mr. 3, who plots to earn the giants' huge bounties.
72	—	11	"Luffy Gets Angry! A Dirty Trick Violates the Sacred Duel!"; Transliteration: "Rufi Okoru! Seinaru Kettō ni Hiretsu na Wana" (Japanese: ルフィ怒る! 聖なる決闘に卑劣な罠)	Yōko Ikeda	Junki Takegami	Eisaku Inoue	June 17, 2001	—	8; 12.5
Usopp, who is immensely impressed with the giants' fight, decides to strive to be like them and starts calling Broggy his master. After their fight, which, like thousands before it, ends in a draw, Dorry receives two barrels of booze from Broggy, which he obtained from Nami and Usopp. Unbeknown to the four, the contents of one of the barrels is made to explode by Mr. 5. When Dorry later drinks it and it badly injures him from within, he accuses the Straw Hats. Left with no choice, Luffy fights the weakened giant and knocks him out. However, by the time of the next eruption of the center volcano, Dorry gets back up and heads into battle, knowing his chances to be bad.
73	—	12	"Broggy's Bitter Tears of Victory! The Conclusion of Elbaf!"; Transliteration: "Burogī Shōri no Gōkyū! Erubafu no Ketchaku!" (Japanese: ブロギー勝利の号泣! エルバフの決着)	Yoshihiro Ueda	Junki Takegami	Yūji Hakamada	June 24, 2001	—	4; 15.3
Before he leaves to face his rival and friend for a last time, Dorry traps Luffy under a huge rock. While the giants fight, Nami and Usopp try to cross the jungle to meet up with Luffy and Vivi at Dorry's camp. While once again fleeing from a hungry dinosaur, Nami is distracted by a life-sized facsimile of Luffy and captivated by Mr. 3's Wax-Wax Fruit powers, which allow him to generate wax. Zoro is captured in a similar way. Usopp arrives alone at Dorry's camp, shortly followed by Mr. 5 and Miss Valentine. The giants' manipulated duel ends in defeat for Dorry. Broggy, who stands in tears over the lifeless body of his friend, is addressed by Mr. 3, who already encased the giant's feet in iron-hard wax. Mr. 5 captures Vivi, while his partner stomps Usopp chest-deep into the ground.
74	—	13	"The Devilish Candle! Tears of Regret and Tears of Anger!"; Transliteration: "Ma no Cyandoru! Munen no Namida to Okari no Namida" (Japanese: 魔のキャンドル! 無念の涙と怒りの涙)	Kōnosuke Uda	Junki Takegami	Hideaki Maniwa	July 15, 2001	—	3; 15.6
After explosively beating down on the still trapped Luffy, Mr. 5 and his partner take Vivi to the giants' duel site, where Mr. 3 is busy further restraining Broggy with his wax. After that, Mr. 3 creates a large, cake-shaped pedestal upon which Vivi, Nami, and Zoro are placed. On top of the pedestal, he creates a rotating platform upon which he places several large candles, which spray wax over his prisoners, slowly turning them into wax figures. Then he explains to Broggy how he manipulated their duel, causing the giant to burst out in anger and break his restraints. However, before he can completely free himself, Mr. 5 knocks the giant out with several explosions and Mr. 3 renews the restraints. Meanwhile, Karoo, Vivi's ostrich sized duck, digs out Luffy from under the rock. The bird, Luffy, and Usopp arrive at the scene just as Zoro attempts to free himself by cutting off his legs.
75	—	14	"A Hex on Luffy! Colors Trap!"; Transliteration: "Rufi o Osō Maryoku! Karāzutorappu!" (Japanese: ルフィを襲う魔力! カラーズトラップ)	Jun'ichi Fujise	Junki Takegami	Kenji Yokoyama	August 12, 2001	—	6; 12.8
Mr. 3 is unsettled, that Zoro and Nami seem to be completely carefree since Luffy's arrival. Usopp and Karoo face Mr. 5 and Miss Valentine, but instead of fighting, they let themselves be chased through the jungle. Luffy tries to destroy the wax pedestal threatening the lives of his friends, while Mr. 3 fights to keep it intact. Once Luffy sent the officer agent flying into the jungle, the captives find Luffy unwilling to help them, because Mr. 3's partner, Miss Golden Week has him firmly under control with her emotion inducing paintings. Unable to catch Karoo and Usopp, Mr. 5 resolves to use his newest piece of equipment, a revolver, which he loads, instead of with bullets, with his explosive breath.
76	—	15	"Time to Fight Back! Usopp's Quick Thinking and Fire Star!"; Transliteration: "Iza Hangeki! Usoppu no Kiten to Kaenboshi!" (Japanese: いざ反撃! ウソップの機転と火炎星!)	Harume Kosaka	Junki Takegami	Masayuki Takagi	August 19, 2001 (Note: Episodes 76 and 77 aired as a television special alongside an episode of Kochikame.)	—	2; 14.9
Once back at the pedestal, Usopp finds Luffy drinking tea with Miss Golden Week, while their friends are already completely covered in wax. He burns Luffy's shirt, upon which Miss Golden Week had painted, using a flaming projectile. Luffy, again himself, attempts to destroy the pedestal but is interrupted by the returning Mr. 3, who creates himself a waxen battle suit. Usopp is finally struck down by Mr. 5's explosive shots, but is still able to make Karoo run around the pedestal dragging behind it a rope, which Usopp soaks in flammable oil. Luffy, then, grabs Mr. 3 at his burning, three-shaped hairdo and uses it to inflame the rope, burning the large wax structure and freeing the others. As they emerge from the flames, Nami and Vivi defeat Miss Valentine and Zoro makes quick work of Mr. 5. Luffy and Karoo chase after Mr. 3 and his partner Miss Golden Week and defeat them, respectively. Meanwhile, Sanji stumbles upon Mr. 3's hideout, where he receives a call from Mr. 0.
77	47b	16	"Escape From Misty Peak" "Farewell Giant Island! Head for Alabasta!"; Transliteration: "Saraba Kyojin no Shima! Arabasuta o Mezase" (Japanese: さらば巨人の島! アラバスタを目指せ)	Yūji Endō	Junki Takegami	Kazuya Hisada	August 19, 2001	August 20, 2005	2; 14.9
Once Sanji realizes that he is talking to Crocodile, he pretends being Mr. 3 and convinces the Warlord that he has eliminated Vivi and her Straw Hat escort. During the conversation, Crocodile's messengers, the otter, and its partner, the vulture, called the Unluckies, arrive to deliver an eternal pose, leading to Alabasta, to Mr. 3. They attack Sanji, but he defeats them. To justify the noisy interruption, Sanji tells Mr. 0 that one of the Straw Hats was still alive. Crocodile tells him to return to Alabasta, then, after the conversation, orders Mr. 2 to intercept and eliminate Mr. 3 en route for his failure to make accurate reports. While Broggy creates a rainfall of tears, Dorry wakes up and concludes that, after a hundred years, Broggy's axe had gotten dull and only knocked him out. Using the eternal pose to guide them to Alabasta, the crew sets sail. Dorry and Broggy see them off, and, to thank them, sacrifice their worn out weapons to kill a giant goldfish as it attempts to feed on the Straw Hats' ship. (Note: The Little Garden storyline was omitted from the 4Kids version and later plot points were altered accordingly; Nami's illness is changed from an obscure prehistoric disease to a more general Grand Line illness and Mr Three is said to have pursued the Straw Hats off-screen since Loguetown.)

== Critical reception ==
D.F. Smith writing for IGN gave the season a 6/10 ("Okay") rating saying that "One Piece took an awfully long time to get rolling, but now that the cast is all together and the plot's got a good head of steam behind it, this is a first-rate kids' adventure show." and that "Now that the story's given them somewhere interesting to go -- and plenty of interesting foes to get in their way -- it's among the best-animated popcorn around." Carl Kimlinger writing for Anime News Network gave the season's dub a B+ and the sub an A−.

== Home media release ==
=== Japanese ===
==== VHS ====
Avex Entertainment/Toei Video (Japan, VHS)
Volume		Episodes	Release date	Ref.
グランドライン突入篇	piece1	62–64	April 3, 2002	
グランドライン突入篇	piece2	65–67	May 2, 2002	
グランドライン突入篇	piece3	68–70	June 5, 2002	
グランドライン突入篇	piece4	71–73	July 3, 2002	
グランドライン突入篇	piece5	74–77	August 7, 2002	

==== DVD ====
Avex Entertainment (Japan, Region 2 DVD)
Volume		Episodes	Release date	Ref.
2ndシーズン グランドライン突入篇	piece.01	62–64	April 3, 2002	
2ndシーズン グランドライン突入篇	piece.02	65–67	May 2, 2002	
2ndシーズン グランドライン突入篇	piece.03	68–70	June 5, 2002	
2ndシーズン グランドライン突入篇	piece.04	71–73	July 3, 2002	
2ndシーズン グランドライン突入篇	piece.05	74–77	August 7, 2002	
ONE PIECE Log Collection	"GRAND LINE"	62–77	December 22, 2010	
ONE PIECE Log Collection SET	EAST BLUE to CHOPPER	1–92	March 27, 2015	

==== Blu-ray ====
The Eternal Log contains 16:9 versions of the episodes in standard definition Blu-ray format.

Avex Pictures (Japan, Region A BD)
Volume		Episodes	Release date	Ref.
ONE PIECE Eternal Log	ARABASTA	62–130	July 23, 2021	

=== English ===
==== 4Kids ====
4Kids Entertainment Edited TV Version: Viz Media (USA, Region 1 DVD), Madman Entertainment (Australia, Region 4)
Volume		Episodes	Release date		ISBN	Ref.
Volume		Episodes	USA	Australia	ISBN	Ref.
10	Baroque Works	42–46	August 28, 2007	November 7, 2007	ISBN 1-59861-009-0	
11	Tony Tony Chopper	47–52	October 30, 2007	January 23, 2008	ISBN 1-59861-010-4	

==== Uncut ====
In North America, this season was recategorized as part of a larger "Season Two", which contained episodes from the first five Japanese seasons, for its DVD release by Funimation Entertainment. The Australian Season Two sets were renamed Collection 5 and 6.

Uncut English & Japanese versions: Funimation Entertainment (USA, Region 1), Manga Entertainment (UK, Region 2), Madman Entertainment (Australia, Region 4)
Volume		Episodes	Release date			ISBN	Ref.
Season Two	First Voyage	54–66	June 30, 2009	N/A	January 12, 2011	ISBN 1-4210-1888-8	
Season Two	Second Voyage	67–78	August 25, 2009	N/A	February 16, 2011	ISBN 1-4210-1889-6	
Collections	Collection 3	54–78	November 29, 2011	September 23, 2013	N/A	ISBN 1-4210-2405-5	
Treasure Chest Collection	One	1–103	N/A		October 24, 2012	ISBN N/A	
Voyage Collection	Two	53–103	N/A		September 6, 2017	ISBN N/A	
