= One Piece season 4 =

One Piece
- Season 4 Alabasta
- The Eternal Log home media cover art for Alabasta, (Note: Rendered in Latin script as Arabasta in Japan) which released on July 23, 2021
- No. of episodes: 38

Release
- Original network: Fuji Television
- Original release: December 16, 2001 – October 27, 2002

Season chronology
- ← Previous; Season 3 Next → Season 5

The fourth season of the One Piece anime television series aired from December 16, 2001, to October 27, 2002, on Fuji Television. Directed by Konosuke Uda and produced by Toei Animation, it adapts the 18th to 24th volumes of the manga by Eiichiro Oda. It follows the adventures of Monkey D. Luffy and his Straw Hat Pirates in the desert country of Arabasta. The first 18 episodes, depicting the Straw Hats and Nefertari Vivi as they arrive in Alabasta to stop an impeding civil war, make up the Arabasta Jōriku (アラバスタ上陸; lit. "Arrival at Alabasta") arc. The remaining episodes make up the "Arabasta Gekidō" (アラバスタ激闘, lit. "Alabasta Fierce Fighting") arc, in which the protagonists defeat Baroque Works and Nico Robin joins the crew.

The first half was released on DVD in six compilations, each containing one disc with two or three episodes, by Toei Animation between February 5 and July 2, 2003. The second half was released on DVD in seven compilations between August 6, 2003, and February 4, 2004. The season was then licensed and heavily edited for a dubbed broadcast and DVD release in English by 4Kids Entertainment. Their adaptation ran from February 25, 2006, though July 28, 2007, on Cartoon Network and, in contrast to the other seasons, also contained the same number of episodes as the original. Starting with the sixth season, Funimation took over dubbing new episodes for broadcast on Cartoon Network. Eventually, they began redubbing the series from the start for uncut release on DVD and released the fourth season, relabeled as "One Piece: Season Two – Fourth Voyage", "One Piece Season Two – Fifth Voyage" and "One Piece: Season Two – Sixth Voyage", respectively, on December 15, 2009, January 19, 2010, and March 16, 2010.

The season makes use of six pieces of theme music: two opening themes and four ending themes. The first opening theme, "Believe", is performed by Folder5 in Japanese and Meredith McCoy in English and continues to be used as the first opening theme until the season's 23rd episode. Starting with episode 24 of the season, the second opening theme Hikari e (ヒカリヘ; lit. Toward the Light), performed by The Babystars in Japanese and Vic Mignogna in English was used. "Before Dawn", performed by Ai-Sachi in Japanese and Carli Mosier in English, continues to be used as the ending theme for the first two episodes. The second ending theme, from episodes 3–14, is "Fish" performed by The Kaleidoscope in Japanese and Leah Clark in English. The third ending theme, from episode 15–26, is "Glory -Kimi ga Iru kara-" (Glory-君がいるから-; lit. Glory: Because You Are Here), performed by Takako Uehara in Japanese and Caitlin Glass in English. The fourth ending theme, used from episode 27 onwards, is "Shining Ray", performed by Janne Da Arc in Japanese and Justin Houston in English. 4Kids used original music for their version, while Funimation opted to use the original theme songs for their version.

== Episodes ==
Orig.	4Kids	No. in season	4Kids title / Funimation title Original Japanese title	Directed by	Written by	Animation directed by	Original release date	English air date (Note: The sources cited here are disputed, showing different dates of when the episodes originally aired in the United States. This article would showcase the dates of when the episodes potentially had their original airdate.)
Alabasta
93	61	1	"Boogie Powder" "Off to the Desert Kingdom! The Rain-Summoning Powder and the Rebel Army!"; Transliteration: "Iza sabaku no kuni e! Ame o yobu kona to hanrangun" (Japanese: いざ砂漠の国へ!雨を呼ぶ粉と反乱軍)	Kōnosuke Uda	Junki Takegami	Eisaku Inoue	December 16, 2001	February 25, 2006
Luffy separates from the rest of the crew to find food, right after arriving at Alabasta's port city of Nanohana. The crew dons disguises while Luffy learns of Dance Powder.
94	62	2	"Chasing Luffy" "The Heroes Reunion! His Name is Fire Fist Ace!"; Transliteration: "Gōketsutachi no saikai! Yatsu no na wa hiken no Ēsu" (Japanese: 豪傑達の再会!奴の名は火拳のエース)	Junji Shimizu	Michiru Shimada	Takeo Ide	December 23, 2001	March 4, 2006
While in Nanohana, the Straw Hats encounter Smoker and Tashigi. A powerful pirate named Portags D. "Fire Fist" Ace appears, and is revealed to be Luffy's older brother.
95	63	3	"Oh, Brother!" "Ace and Luffy! Hot Emotions and Brotherly Bonds!"; Transliteration: "Ēsu to Luffy! Atsuki omoi to kyōdai no kizuna" (Japanese: エースとルフィ!熱き想いと兄弟の絆)	Hidehiko Kadota	Michiru Shimada	Hideaki Maniwa	January 6, 2002 (Note: Episode 95 originally aired as part of a special alongside episodes of Sazae-san, Chibi Maruko-chan, and Kochikame.)	March 11, 2006
Ace fights Smoker while the Straw Hats run for their ship. Luffy reunites with his older brother, who has joined the Whitebeard Pirates after leaving home, and is searching for a former crewmate named Blackbeard who killed a fellow member. The brothers take down agents of Baroque Works, and Ace demonstrates his Flame-Flame Fruit power by destroying several ships in one attack.
96	64	4	"All Dried Up" "Erumalu, the City of Green and the Kung Fu Dugongs!"; Transliteration: "Midori no machi Erumaru to Kunfū Jugon!" (Japanese: 緑の町エルマルとクンフージュゴン!)	Yōko Ikeda	Michiru Shimada	Kenji Yokoyama	January 13, 2002	March 11, 2006; March 18, 2006
Ace decides to travel with the Straw Hats, as he is hunting for a man known as Blackbeard. The group arrives first at the 'Green City' of Erumalu only to find it abandoned to the desert. Vivi and Nami explain what Dance Powder is and what it has done to Alabasta.
97	65	5	"Humps, Bumps & Chumps" "Adventure in the Country of Sand! The Monsters that Live in the Scorching Land!"; Transliteration: "Suna no kuni no bōken! Ennetsu no daichi ni sugomu mamono" (Japanese: 砂の国の冒険!炎熱の大地に棲む魔物)	Harume Kosaka	Junki Takegami	Kazuya Hisada	January 20, 2002	March 25, 2006; April 29, 2006
After leaving Erumalu, the Straw Hats plus Vivi & Ace continue through the desert, facing the many dangers of it.
98	66	6	"The Sand Trap" "Enter the Desert Pirates! The Men Who Live Freely!"; Transliteration: "Sabaku no kaizokudan tōjō! Jiyū ni ikiru otokotachi" (Japanese: 砂漠の海賊団登場!自由に生きる男達)	Daisuke Nishio	Junki Takegami	Masayuki Takagi	January 27, 2002	April 5, 2006; May 6, 2006
Nami and Vivi found themselves an easier way to travel in the desert and leave all men behind. While trying to catch up with them, Ace gets lost. Luffy and the rest of the gang find the Desert Pirates, and Vivi meets a figure from her past. She learns that the two met while they were young girls, and despite her father's offer to help if anything happened to the town, the town was abandoned when the drought started and the sandstorms hit. Vivi apologizes and the two reconcile.
99	67	7	"Tough Bluff" "False Fortitude! Camu, Rebel Soldier at Heart!"; Transliteration: "Nisemono no iji! Kokoro no hanrangun Kamyu!" (Japanese: ニセモノの意地!心の反乱軍カミュ!)	Munehisa Sakai	Junki Takegami	Eisaku Inoue	February 3, 2002	April 6, 2006; May 13, 2006
After hearing that a small village has fake Rebel Army bodyguards that have been keeping peace, Vivi asks the men of the crew to test if they're worthy of staying. While they initially are planning to run at the first sign of a real threat, they stand their ground, and are allowed to stay as the Straw Hats retreat.
100	68	8	"Kids of the Kingdom" "Rebel Warrior Koza! The Dream Vowed to Vivi!"; Transliteration: "Hanrangun senshi Kōza! Bibi ni chikatta yume!" (Japanese: 反乱軍戦士コーザ!ビビに誓った夢!)	Yūji Endō	Junki Takegami	Takeo Ide	February 10, 2002	April 10, 2006; May 20, 2006
Still trekking through the Alabasta desert, the crew beats up a giant desert scorpion for lunch, while Vivi tells Nami about her past and her friendship with Kohza. When his village faced a drought, he appealed the king for help, and Cobra allowed the villagers to stay in the capital. He and Vivi were initially not on good terms, getting into a fight when they first met, but Vivi became vice-leader of the Sand Sand Clan, and Kohza's group risked their lives to save her from kidnappers. Kohza then left with his father to establish a new town called Yuba.
101	69	9	"Scorpion" "Showdown in a Heat Haze! Ace vs. the Gallant Scorpion!"; Transliteration: "Yōen no kettō! Ēsu vs otoko sukōpion" (Japanese: 陽炎の決闘!エースVS男スコーピオン)	Hidehiko Kadota	Michiru Shimada	Kenji Yokoyama	February 17, 2002	April 11, 2006
Ace fights against a bounty hunter, who claims to have defeated Blackbeard, although this was a lie to lure Ace out and challenge him in order to inspire his children to follow their dreams. Ace finds out that Blackbeard isn't in Alabasta after all, and leaves the group to continue looking for him. He leaves Luffy a mysterious piece of paper, explaining that it will let them meet again.
102	70	10	"Secret Beneath the Sand" "Ruins and Lost Ways! Vivi, Her Friends, and the Country's Form!"; Transliteration: "Kiseki to maigo! Bibi to nakama to kuni no katachi" (Japanese: 遺跡と迷子!ビビと仲間と国のかたち)	Kōnosuke Uda	Michiru Shimada	Hideaki Maniwa	February 24, 2002	April 12, 2006; June 3, 2006
Zoro, Chopper and Luffy manage to get themselves lost and stumble across some huge underground ruins.
103	71	11	"Odd Numbers" "Spiders Café at 8 o'Clock! The Enemy Leaders Gather!"; Transliteration: "Supaidāzu Kafe ni hachiji teki kanbu shūgō" (Japanese: スパイダーズカフェに8時敵幹部集合)	Harume Kosaka	Junki Takegami	Masayuki Takagi	March 3, 2002	April 13, 2006; June 10, 2006
Baroque Works plan starts to take effect, and for that, the Number Agents gather to meet Mr. 0. Meanwhile, the crew finds out that the Rebel Army has moved out of Yuba and headed to Katorea, and the rebel leader Kohza is determined to attack.
104	72	12	"Zero" "Luffy vs. Vivi! The Tearful Vow to Put Friends on the Line!"; Transliteration: "Rufi vs Bibi! Nakama ni kakeru namida no chikai" (Japanese: ルフィVSビビ!仲間に賭ける涙の誓い)	Ken Koyama	Junki Takegami	Eisaku Inoue	March 10, 2002	June 17, 2006
In Yuba, Luffy learns that Toto was entrusted by Cobra to watch over the land and figures out a way to stop the sandstorm. At Rain Dinners, the Officer Agents learn that their leader, Mr. 0, is actually Crocodile, and learn that they are going to overthrow the country during the war. Mr. 3 reveals that the Straw Hats are alive. As punishment, Crocodile dries him up and drops him into a Bananagator pit for failing to kill them. Crocodile has Ms. All-Sunday tell the rebel army to kill everyone on sight. Meanwhile, the Straw Hats depart to Katorea, but Luffy stops. When Luffy tells Vivi of his plan to defeat Crocodile and denounces Vivi's plan to stop the rebellion as naive, the two get into a struggle. During this, Vivi reveals that she will only risk her own life. Luffy, however, says that she should be putting their lives on the line together and to trust her friends, and Vivi is moved to tears by his statement.
105	73	13	"Chase to Rainbase" "The Battlefront of Alabasta! Rainbase, the City of Dreams!"; Transliteration: "Arabasuta sensen! Yume no machi Reinbēsu!" (Japanese: アラバスタ戦線!夢の町レインベース)	Yūji Endō	Michiru Shimada	Naoki Tate & Masahiro Shimanuki	March 17, 2002	June 24, 2006
After the struggle, Vivi decides to go after Crocodile with the Straw Hats. The crew travels to the city of Rainbase, but run afoul of Smoker and Tashigi. They run toward Rain Dinners, walking into Crocodile's trap.
106	74	14	"Caged!" "The Trap of Certain Defeat! Storming Raindinners!"; Transliteration: "Zettai zetsumei no wana! Reindināzu totsunyū" (Japanese: 絶体絶命の罠!レインディナーズ突入)	Hidehiko Kadota	Michiru Shimada	Takeo Ide	March 24, 2002	July 1, 2006
Most of the Straw Hats, along with Smoker, are trapped by Crocodile. Vivi reunites with the royal guardian Pell, but is captured by Miss All-Sunday. Crocodile reveals his invincible Devil Fruit power, The Sand-Sand Fruit.
107	75	15	"Kingnapped" "Operation Utopia Commences! The Swell of Rebellion Stirs!"; Transliteration: "Yūtopia sakusen hatsudō! Ugokidashita uneri" (Japanese: ユートピア作戦発動!動き出した)	Kōnosuke Uda	Michiru Shimada	Kenji Yokoyama	April 14, 2002	July 8, 2006
Baroque Works' plan to take over Alabasta is set in motion. The king is kidnapped, and Mr. 2 impersonates him, framing him for ordering the destruction of Nanohana to cover up the Dance Powder incident there, and the rebel army begins to move.
108	76	16	"They Call Me Mr. Prince" "The Terrifying Banana Gators and Mr. Prince!"; Transliteration: "Kyōfu no Bananawani to Misutā Purinsu" (Japanese: 恐怖のバナナワニとミスタープリンス)	Ken Koyama	Michiru Shimada	Hideaki Maniwa	April 21, 2002	July 8, 2006
Most of the Straw Hats are helplessly trapped as Vivi tries desperately to get the key to their cage but fails. Crocodile is contacted by someone known as "Mr. Prince."
109	77	17	"The Great Escape" "The Key to a Great Comeback Escape! The Wax-Wax Ball!"; Transliteration: "Gyakuden dai dasshutsu e no kagi! Dorudoru Bōru!" (Japanese: 逆転大脱出への鍵!ドルドルボール!)	Daisuke Nishio	Junki Takegami	Masayuki Takagi	April 28, 2002	February 3, 2007
"Mr Prince" is actually Sanji, and lures Crocodile out of the casino. Sanji goes to rescue the Straw Hats, and manages to open their cage by having Mr. 3, who was swallowed by one of the Bananagators, copy the key with his Wax-Wax Fruit powers. The room floods, but the Straw Hats swim to safety. Luffy orders Zoro to save Smoker, and he allows them to escape for the moment as they race to stop the rebellion.
110	78	18	"Zero Tolerance" "Merciless Mortal Combat! Luffy vs. Crocodile!"; Transliteration: "Nasakemuyō no shitō! Rufi vs Kurokodairu!" (Japanese: 情無用の死闘!ルフィVSクロコダイル)	Yūji Endō	Junki Takegami	Eisaku Inoue	May 5, 2002	February 10, 2007
After escaping from Rain Dinners, the Straw Hats and Vivi cross the desert to Alubarne, where the final battle will take place. Crocodile, however, manages to catch Luffy, beginning the first round of their battle. Luffy is unable to land a hit on Crocodile because of his Sand-Sand Fruit powers, which enabled him to turn into sand to avoid any attack.
111	79	19	"Off the Hook" "Dash For a Miracle! Alabasta Animal Land!"; Transliteration: "Kiseki e no Shissō! Arabasuta Dōbutsu Rando" (Japanese: 奇跡への疾走!アラバスタ動物ランド)	Jun'ichi Fujise	Junki Takegami	Natsuko Makiyo	May 12, 2002	February 17, 2007
Luffy is left for dead by Crocodile, but is helped by the mysterious Miss All-Sunday. The rest of the Straw Hats reach Alubarna.
112	80	20	"Rebel Rousers" "Rebel Army vs. Royal Army! Showdown at Alubarna!"; Transliteration: "Hanrangun vs kokuōgun! Kessen wa Arubāna!" (Japanese: 反乱軍VS国王軍!決戦はアルバーナ!)	Munehisa Sakai	Michiru Shimada	Naoki Tate & Masahiro Shimanuki	May 19, 2002	February 24, 2007
The revolution is on the verge of starting and the crew comes out with a plan that could stop it. Vivi tries to call out to the Rebel Army, but fails because of a Baroque Works infiltrator in the Royal Army interferes. She is nearly trampled by the incoming army, but Karoo manages to protect her. Meanwhile, Sanji finds out that Mr. 2 defeated Usopp and Eyelashes, and is heading toward Vivi. Vivi sees through Mr. 2's deception when he reveals that he doesn't know Karoo's name or care for him, and when he fails to remove the bandage on his arm.
113	81	21	"Two Bad" "Alubarna Grieves! The Fierce Captain Karoo!"; Transliteration: "Naki no Arubāna! Gekitō Karū taichō" (Japanese: 嘆きのアルバーナ!激闘カルー隊長!)	Hidehiko Kadota	Michiru Shimada	Kazuya Hisada	June 2, 2002	March 3, 2007
Karoo musters up the strength to carry Vivi up Alubarna's walls and into the city. When Karoo collapses, Mr. 2 is attacked by Sanji and members of the supersonic duck force. Meanwhile, Usopp arrives to help Chopper in his battle with Mr. 4, who hits exploding baseballs from his Dachshund-bazooka hybrid (thanks to the Dog-Dog Fruit: Model: Dachshund), and Miss Merry Christmas, who ate the Mole-Mole Fruit to become a mole-human hybrid.
114	82	22	"Extra Innings" "Sworn on a Friend's Dream! The Battle of Molehill, Block 4!"; Transliteration: "Nakama no yumi ni chikau! Kettō Mogura tsuka 4 banchō" (Japanese: 仲間の夢に誓う!決闘モグラ塚4番街)	Directed by : Kōji Tanaka; Storyboarded by : Kōnosuke Uda	Junki Takegami	Noboru Koizumi	June 9, 2002	March 10, 2007
Usopp & Chopper struggle against the Mr. 4 team's attacks, with Miss Merry Christmas attacking from underground and Mr. 4 batting explosive balls. Usopp's plan to use a fake "5-ton" hammer against the two fails after it gets destroyed and revealed as fake, but Chopper manages to trick Lasso into firing into the tunnels. When the two are still standing after that attack, Usopp attempts to flee, but Miss Merry Christmas catches him and taunts him by claiming that Luffy is dead.
115	83	23	"Blow Up!" "Big Opening Day Today! The Copy-Copy Montage!"; Transliteration: "Honjitsu dai kōkai! Manemane Montāju!" (Japanese: 本日大公開!マネマネモンタージュ!)	Harume Kosaka	Junki Takegami	Takeo Ide	June 16, 2002	March 17, 2007
Usopp is badly injured by a combination attack by the Mr. 4 team, but with Chopper's help, he tricks Mr. 4 into hitting Miss Merry Christmas, then finishes him off by launching a hammer from a slingshot on Chopper's antlers. Sanji fights with Mr. 2, and while they are evenly matched, Mr. 2 realizes that Sanji cannot attack him if he transforms into Nami, using that to prevent Sanji from fighting back.
116	84	24	"Trading Faces" "Transformed into Nami! Bon Clay's Rapid-Fire Ballet Kenpo!"; Transliteration: "Nami ni henshin! Bonkurē renpatsu baree Kenpō" (Japanese: ナミに変身!ボンクレ-連発バレエ拳法)	Ken Koyama	Michiru Shimada	Kenji Yokoyama	June 23, 2002	March 24, 2007
Sanji manages to figure out that Mr. 2 must transform into his original form to use his Ballet Kenpo, and finally manages to defeat him. Vivi decides to have Chaka blow up the palace to distract the rebels long enough to reveal the truth, but before she can carry out the plan, Crocodile arrives with the kidnapped Cobra.
117	85	25	"The Weather Forcer" "Nami's Cyclone Advisory! Clima Takt Burst!"; Transliteration: "Nami no senpū chūihō! Kurimatakuto sakuretsu" (Japanese: ナミの旋風注意報!クリマタクト炸裂)	Yōko Ikeda	Michiru Shimada	Hideaki Maniwa	June 30, 2002	April 14, 2007
Nami faces off against Miss Doublefinger and tries to figure out her new weapon, the Clima Takt (Climate Baton), at the same time.
118	86	26	"Bad Girls" "Secret Passed Down in the Royal Family! The Ancient Weapon Pluton!"; Transliteration: "Ōke ni tsuwaru himitsu! Kodai heiki Puruton" (Japanese: 王家に伝わる秘密!古代兵器プルトン)	Yūji Endō	Michiru Shimada	Masayuki Takagi	July 14, 2002	April 21, 2007
While Crocodile reveals to Vivi that he seeks the ancient weapon Pluton, Nami manages to defeat Miss Doublefinger with Tornado Tempo.
119	87	27	"Zoro vs. Mr. One" "Secret of Powerful Swordplay! Ability to Cut Steel and the Rhythm Things Have!"; Transliteration: "Gōken no kyokui! Kōtetsu o kiru chikara to mono no kokyū" (Japanese: 豪剣の極意!鋼鉄を斬る力と物の呼吸)	Munehisa Sakai	Junki Takegami	Eisaku Inoue	July 21, 2002	April 28, 2007
Zoro struggles against Mr. 1 as his attacks have no effect on his steel body, but Mr. 1's Dice Dice Fruit enables him to attack by using any part of his body as a steel blade. After Mr. 1 severely wounds Zoro, he becomes able to sense the rhythm that all things have, enabling to cut or not cut at will, and allowing him to defeat Mr. 1 with a single slash.
120	88	28	"Hook, Lie & Sinker" "The Battle is Over! Koza Raises the White Flag!"; Transliteration: "Tatakai wa owatta! Kōza ga ageta shiroi hata" (Japanese: 戦いは終わった!コーザが掲げた白い旗)	Hidehiko Kadota	Junki Takegami	Kazuya Hisada	August 4, 2002	May 5, 2007
When Vivi reveals Crocodile's plan to Koza, he attempts to stop the fighting, but is shot. Crocodile reveals that he has set up a massive bomb in the city.
121	89	29	"His Fatal Flaw" "Where Vivi's Voice Gets Heard! The Hero Descends!"; Transliteration: "Bibi no koe no yukue! Hīrō wa maiorita!" (Japanese: ビビの声の行方!英雄は舞い降りた!)	Harume Kosaka	Junki Takegami	Natsuko Makiyo	August 11, 2002	May 12, 2007
As Koza tries to stop the Rebel Army, both sides are once more fighting due to the intervention of Baroque Works. Vivi is thrown to her certain death when a fully recovered Luffy saves her and challenges Crocodile to a second round of the final battle, revealing that he has learned that he is weak against water.
122	90	30	"Live & Let Dry" "Sand Croc and Water Luffy! The Second Round of the Duel!"; Transliteration: "Suna wani to mizu Rufi! Kettō dai ni raundo" (Japanese: 砂ワニと水ルフィ!決闘第2ラウンド)	Directed by : Jun'ichi Fujise; Storyboarded by : Kenji Yokoyama	Michiru Shimada	Takeo Ide	August 18, 2002	May 19, 2007
Luffy fights Crocodile with more success this time by using water, but is defeated after Crocodile dries up the ground. Meanwhile, the other Straw Hats hurry to locate the bomb before it goes off. Miss All-Sunday forces the king to take her to the tomb where the Poneglyph with Pluton's location is hidden, defeating Tashigi when she tries to stop her.
123	91	31	"The Crypt Script" "That Looks Croc-ish! Luffy, Run to the Royal Tomb!"; Transliteration: "Wanippoi! Ōke no haka e hashire Rufi!" (Japanese: ワニっぽい!王家の墓へ走れルフィ!)	Junji Shimizu	Michiru Shimada	Kenji Yokoyama	August 25, 2002	May 26, 2007
Crocodile joins Miss All-Sunday in the tomb, and orders her to translate the Poneglyph. Miss All-Sunday tells him that Pluton was not mentioned and that it was only about history, but Crocodile figures out that she was lying and stabs her in response. When Luffy recovers from the previous round of the final battle, he chases after Crocodile into the tomb.
124	92	32	"The Sweat Threat" "The Nightmare Draws Near! This is the Sand-Sand Clan's Secret Base!"; Transliteration: "Akumu no toki semaru! Koko wa Sunasunadan himitsu kichi" (Japanese: 悪夢の時迫る!ここは砂砂団秘密基地)	Yūji Endō	Michiru Shimada	Takayuki Shimura	September 1, 2002	June 9, 2007
Luffy fights with Crocodile by using blood on his fists, but Crocodile reveals that he has a poisonous hook, and plans on finishing Luffy off once and for all. Meanwhile, Vivi finds the bomb and calls the Straw Hats together, but realize that the Mr. 7 team is guarding the bomb.
125	93	33	"The Bomb in the Belfry" "Magnificent Wings! My Name is Pell, Guardian Deity of the Country!"; Transliteration: "Idai naru tsubame! Wa ga na wa kuno no shigoshin Peru" (Japanese: 偉大なる翼!我が名は国の守護神ペル)	Hidehiko Kadota	Yoshiyuki Suga	Hideaki Maniwa	September 8, 2002	June 16, 2007
Vivi finds the bomb inside of the clock tower, but the Mr. 7 pair of Baroque Works are there to protect it. Vivi defeats them, but she realizes the bomb cannot be stopped so easily. It has a timer, and right before it blows up, Pell shows up and takes it into the atmosphere, where he sacrifices himself to save Alabasta. Meanwhile, the final round of the final battle between Luffy and Crocodile continues, with Luffy struggling due to Crocodile's use of poison.
126	94	34	"Sandbagged" "I Will Surpass You! Rain Falls in Alabasta!"; Transliteration: "Koete iku! Arabasuta ni ame ga furu!" (Japanese: 越えていく!アラバスタに雨が降る!)	Munehisa Sakai	Michiru Shimada	Eisaku Inoue	September 15, 2002	June 23, 2007
Luffy finally defeats Crocodile by punching him through solid bedrock. When Crocodile falls, the rain-drops calm the soldiers.
127	95	35	"All the King's Men" "A Farewell to Arms! Pirates and Different Ideas of Justice!"; Transliteration: "Buki yo saraba! Kaizoku to ikutsu ka no seigi" (Japanese: 武器よさらば!海賊といくつかの正義)	Harume Kosaka	Yoshiyuki Suga	Masayuki Takagi	October 6, 2002 (Note: Episodes 127 and 128 originally aired as part of a special alongside an episode of Kochikame.)	June 30, 2007
Despite the rain falling, some rebels still wish to fight, but Igaram appears with proof of Cobra's innocence, as well as Koza telling everything the truth. The Straw Hats meet with Vivi's father, and they collapse from their wounds, but Tashigi orders the marines under her command not to capture them. Tashigi and Smoker both are rewarded for taking on Crocodile, but neither one of them believes that is right, considering the Straw Hat Pirates did all the work to defeat Crocodile.
128	96	36	"The Turn of the Two" "Pirates' Banquet and Operation Escape from Alabasta!"; Transliteration: "Kaizokutachi no utage to Arabasuta dasshutsu sakusen!" (Japanese: 海賊たちの宴とアラバスタ脱出作戦!)	Junji Shimizu	Yoshiyuki Suga	Noboru Koizumi	October 6, 2002	July 14, 2007
Luffy is rescued from the collapsed tomb where he fought Crocodile and brought into Cobra's palace to rest. When he awakens, a magnificent banquet is thrown for the pirates, then, the Straw Hats are invited to enjoy the hot spring steam room inside the palace. Igaram receives word that Luffy's bounty has increased to 100 million Berries and Zoro has a 60 million berry bounty. However, the Straw Hats have already left, having been told by Mr. 2 to meet him to pick up their ship and evade the blockade. They tell Vivi that if she wishes to join, she must meet them in twelve hours.
129	97	37	"Pirate Vivi?" "It All Started On That Day! Vivi Tells the Story of Her Adventure!"; Transliteration: "Hajimaru wa ano hi! Bibi ga kataru bōkendan" (Japanese: 始まりはあの日!ビビが語る冒険譚)	Daisuke Nishio	Yoshiyuki Suga	Kazuya Hisada	October 20, 2002	July 21, 2007
Bon Clay and his crew attempt to protect the Straw Hats from Hina, and sacrifice themselves to serve as a diversion. Vivi has Igaram stand in for her at her speech, and tells the Straw Hats that she cannot travel with them, but she hopes she will still be seen as their friend if they meet again. Unable to acknowledge her vocally without her being branded a criminal, the crew shows the marks on their arms as a sign of their friendship.
130	98	38	"Stowaway" "Scent of Danger! The Seventh Member is Nico Robin!"; Transliteration: "Kiken na kaori! Shichininme wa Niko Robin!" (Japanese: 危険な香り!七人目はニコ·ロビン!)	Yōko Ikeda	Yoshiyuki Suga	Takayuki Shimura	October 27, 2002	July 28, 2007
The Marines fail again to catch the Straw Hats. After escaping from the Marines, Nico Robin (Ms. All Sunday) appears from inside of the Straw Hats ship. She manages to persuade the crew to let her join. Pell, who's survive from the bomb's explosion, seen at the end of the episode standing over his own grave.

== Home media release ==
=== Japanese ===
==== DVD ====
Avex Mode (Japan, Region 2 DVD)
Volume		Episodes	Release date	Ref.
4thシーズン アラバスタ上陸篇	Piece.01	93–95	February 5, 2003	
4thシーズン アラバスタ上陸篇	Piece.02	96–98	March 5, 2003	
4thシーズン アラバスタ上陸篇	Piece.03	99–101	April 2, 2003	
4thシーズン アラバスタ上陸篇	Piece.04	102–104	May 8, 2003	
4thシーズン アラバスタ上陸篇	Piece.05	105–107	June 4, 2003	
4thシーズン アラバスタ上陸篇	Piece.06	108–110	July 2, 2003	
4thシーズン アラバスタ激闘篇	piece.01	111–112	August 6, 2003	
4thシーズン アラバスタ激闘篇	piece.02	113–115	September 3, 2003	
4thシーズン アラバスタ激闘篇	piece.03	116–118	October 1, 2003	
4thシーズン アラバスタ激闘篇	piece.04	119–121	November 6, 2003	
4thシーズン アラバスタ激闘篇	piece.05	122–124	December 3, 2003	
4thシーズン アラバスタ激闘篇	piece.06	125–127	January 7, 2004	
4thシーズン アラバスタ激闘篇	piece.07	128–130	February 4, 2004	
ONE PIECE Log Collection	"ARABASTA"	93–110	January 28, 2011	
ONE PIECE Log Collection	"VIVI"	111–130	January 28, 2011	

==== Blu-ray ====
The Eternal Log contains 16:9 versions of the episodes in standard definition Blu-ray format.

Avex Pictures (Japan, Region A BD)
Volume		Episodes	Release date	Ref.
ONE PIECE Eternal Log	ARABASTA	62–130	July 23, 2021	

=== English ===
In North America, this season was recategorized as part of "Season Two" for its DVD release by Funimation Entertainment. The Australian Season Two sets were renamed Collection 8 through 10.

Funimation Entertainment (USA, Region 1), Manga Entertainment (UK, Region 2), Madman Entertainment (Australia, Region 4)
Volume		Episodes	Release date			ISBN	Ref.
Volume		Episodes	USA	UK	Australia	ISBN	Ref.
Season Two	Fourth Voyage	92–103	December 15, 2009	N/A	April 20, 2011	ISBN 1-4210-1891-8	
Season Two	Fifth Voyage	104–116	January 19, 2010	N/A	May 18, 2011	ISBN 1-4210-1892-6	
Season Two	Sixth Voyage	117–130	March 16, 2010	N/A	June 15, 2011	ISBN 1-4210-2004-1	
Collections	Collection 4	79–103	January 31, 2012	November 11, 2013	N/A	ISBN 1-4210-2447-0	
Collections	Collection 5	104–130	March 13, 2012	February 17, 2014	N/A	ISBN 1-4210-2466-7	
Treasure Chest Collection	One	1–103	N/A		October 24, 2012	ISBN N/A	
Treasure Chest Collection	Two	104–205	N/A		October 31, 2013	ISBN N/A	
Voyage Collection	Two	54-103	N/A		September 6, 2017	ISBN N/A	
Voyage Collection	Three	104-156	N/A		October 4, 2017	ISBN N/A	
