= Yuya Ishii =

Yuya Ishii may refer to

- Yuya Ishii (director), Japanese film director
- Yuya Ishii (baseball), Japanese baseball player
