= The Charm of Others =

2012 film by Ryutaro Ninomiya

- Title card
- Directed by: Ryutaro Ninomiya
- Written by: Ryutaro Ninomiya
- Produced by: Ryutaro Ninomiya
- Starring: Yoshitaka Hosokawa; Ryutaro Ninomiya; Kensuke Ashihara; Daisuke Udagawa; Keisuke Minakawa; Takuya Makino
- Cinematography: Yusuke Nishimura
- Edited by: Ryutaro Ninomiya
- Music by: pot au feu
- Distributed by: Pia Film Festival
- Release date: 23 October 2012 (Japan)
- Running time: 89 minutes
- Country: Japan
- Language: Japanese

The Charm of Others (Japanese: 魅力の人間, Hepburn: Miryoku no ningen) is a 2012 Japanese drama film written and directed by Ryutaro Ninomiya. The film was selected to screen at a number of international festivals, including the International Film Festival Rotterdam, the Subversive Festival in 2019, and was featured at the Pia Film Festival in 2012, where it won the Semi-Grand Prix. The Charm of Others was Ninomiya's first film.

== Plot ==
The story follows a group of men who are employed at a factory that repairs vending machines. Yoda, one of the men, is a quiet introverted type, tending to keep his distance from his workmates.

A senior worker, Takahashi, takes a dislike to Yoda's attitude which he interprets as rude. Another worker, Oshima, defends Yoda. Another worker, Sakata, greets Yoda every day trying to develop a friendship with him. Takahashi finally abuses Yoda. Yoda then leaves, walking through the city at night, encountering a slightly intoxicated Sakata. The director, Ninomiya, plays one of the main roles

== Cast ==
- Yoshitaka Hosokawa
- Ryutaro Ninomiya
- Kensuke Ashihara
- Daisuke Udagawa
- Keisuke Minakawa
- Takuya Makino

== Awards and screenings ==
The film won the PFF Award Competition 2012, as well as the runner-up award at the Pia Film Festival. It was screened at a number of film festivals in 2012, starting with the Vancouver International Film Festival (VIFF). The film received an additional screening in 2018 at the 8th ENBU Seminar Cinema Project in Tokyo, Japan.

== Reception ==
The Bulletin reviewed The Charm of Others when it screened at VIFF, praising the movie's visuals and stating that Ninomiya was "A director (also, in this case, screenwriter and actor) to be watched."
