= 19 (film) =

2001 film by Kazushi Watanabe

- Directed by: Kazushi Watanabe
- Screenplay by: Kazushi Watanabe
- Edited by: Kazushi Watanabe
- Release date: July 14, 2001 (Japan)
- Running time: 83 minutes
- Country: Japan
- Language: Japanese

19 is a 2001 Japanese drama film written and directed by Kazushi Watanabe. It was released on 14 July 2001.

== Cast ==
- Daijiro Kawaoka as Usami
- Kazushi Watanabe
- Masashi Endō
- Nachi Nozawa
- Ryo Shinmyo
- Takeo Noro

== Reception ==
Tom Mes of Midnight Eye wrote that the film "has less to do with social comment than with delivering an exercise in consistency."
