= Hikari Mitsushima =

Japanese actress and model (born 1985)

- 満島 ひかり
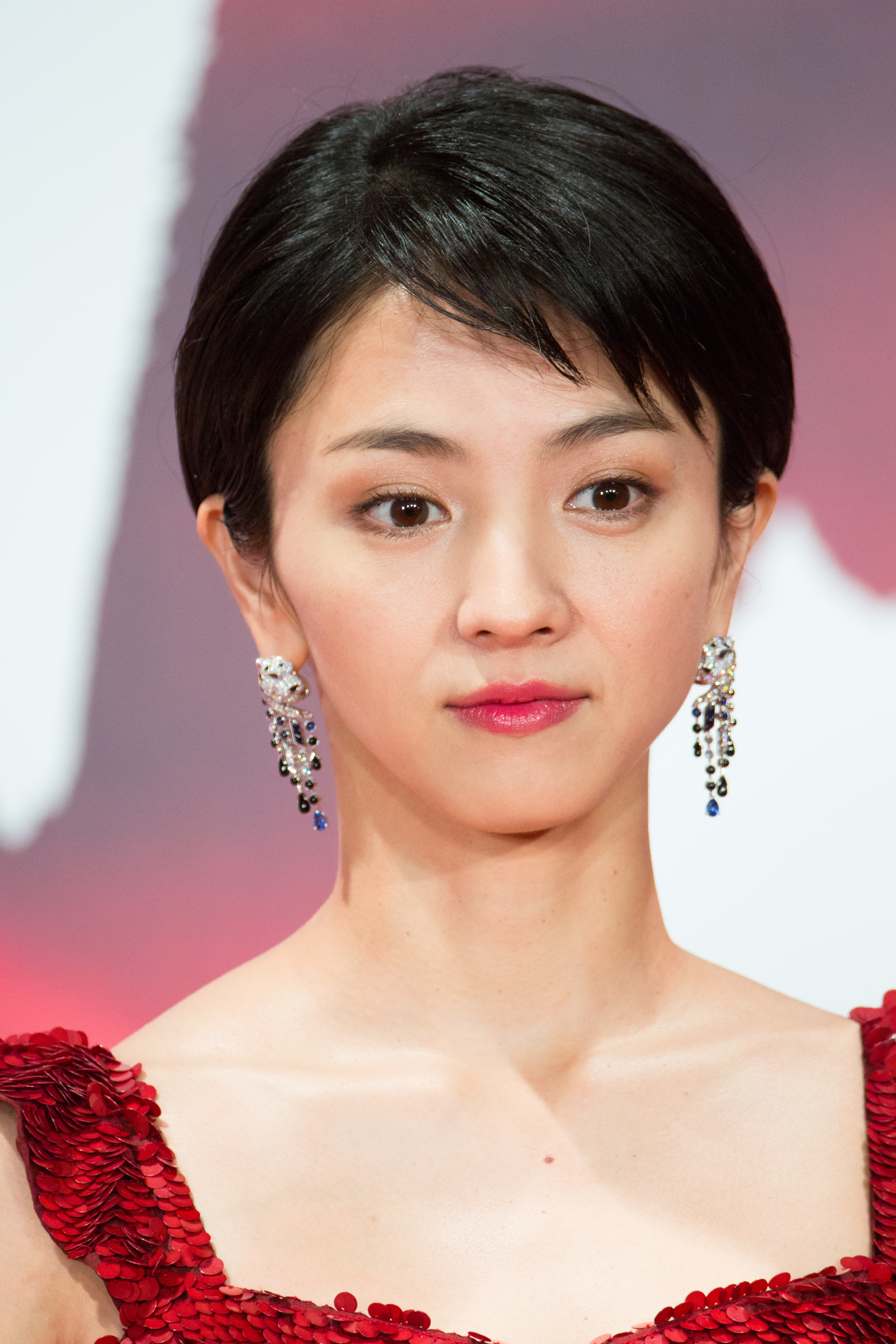
- Mitsushima at Tokyo International Film Festival in 2017
- Born: 30 November 1985 (age 40); Kagoshima, Japan
- Occupation: Actress
- Years active: 1997–present
- Hometown: Okinawa City, Okinawa Prefecture
- Height: 1.62 m (5 ft 4 in)
- Spouse: Yuya Ishii (m. 2010; div. 2016) Keisuke Asano (m. 2026)
- Relatives: Shinnosuke Mitsushima (brother)
- Musical career
- Genre: PopJ-pop
- Instrument: Vocals
- Formerly of: Folder 5

Signature
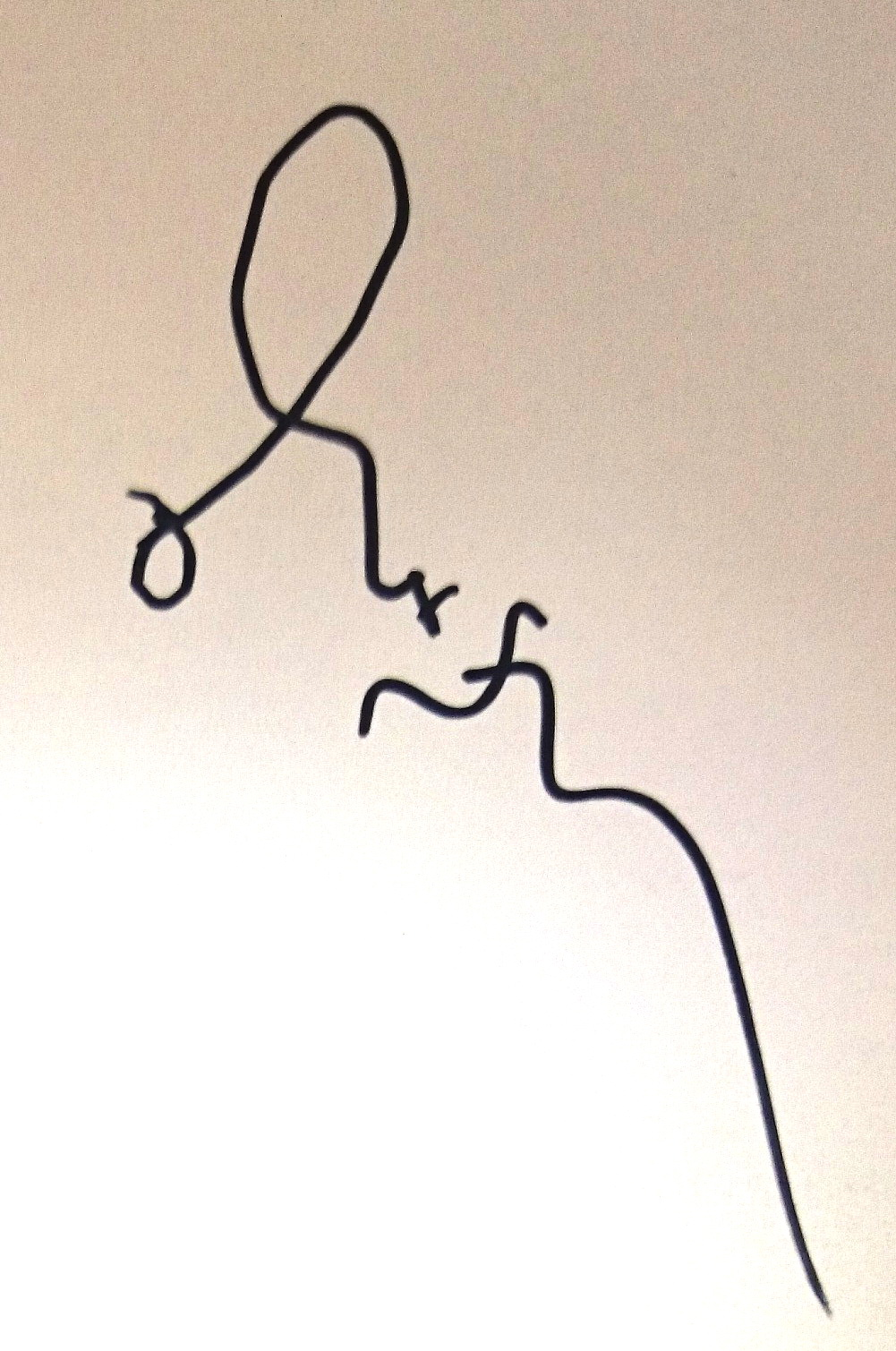

Hikari Mitsushima (満島 ひかり, Mitsushima Hikari; born 30 November 1985) is a Japanese actress, model and former singer. In 2017 she was the vocalist and dancer in Mondo Grosso's videos for "Labyrinth", which has garnered over 42 million views on YouTube as of December 2025, and "In this World".

== Biography ==
Mitsushima was born in Kagoshima on 30 November 1985 and grew up in Okinawa City, Okinawa Prefecture. Her younger siblings are actor Shinnosuke Mitsushima, professional basketball player Kotaro Mitsushima, and her younger sister model Minami Mitsushima. Her grandfather was an American national of Italian descent.

== Career ==
She is a graduate of Okinawa Actors School. She began her music career in 1997 as a teenage 'idol singer' in the J-pop groups Folder and Folder 5. She made her acting debut in the same year, starring as Shiori Uchiura / Little Girl in the kaiju film Rebirth of Mothra II. Her first television appearance came in 2005, when she played Elly in Ultraman Max. Her film career recommenced as Sayu Yagami in 2006's manga-adaptation thriller film Death Note, and in 2008 she starred as Yōko Ozawa in Love Exposure, a comedy-drama / art film directed by Sion Sono. Her performance in Love Exposure brought her critical attention and won her and her team several awards.

Since then, Mitsushima has had starring roles in numerous films and television dramas including 2010's Sawako Decides, written and directed by Yuya Ishii.

Mitsushima has made occasional vocal contributions to Japanese pop singles. She featured as a vocalist in the fictional band SRM on Stephanie's "Pride ~A Part of Me~", the title song for the 2009 Japanese drama film Pride. In 2017, she provided lead vocals for fictional band Doughnuts Hole's "Otona no Okite", the theme song for television drama Quartet, in which she starred as Suzume Sebuki. In the same year, she appeared as a featured vocalist in Mondo Grosso's song "Labyrinth" and starred as a dancer in the music video (over 35 million views on YouTube, as of February 2023).

== Personal life ==
Mitsushima announced via fax through her agency that she has registered her marriage with film director Yuya Ishii on October 25, 2010. They later divorced in early 2016 citing differing lifestyle choices as the cause. In May 2016, it was revealed that she briefly dated actor Kento Nagayama.

Mitsushima announced her second marriage to model Keisuke Asano, as well as her first pregnancy, on March 30, 2026.

== Filmography ==
=== Film ===
- Rebirth of Mothra II (1997) as Shiori Uranai / Little girl
- Death Note (2006) as Sayu Yagami
- Death Note 2: The Last Name (2006) as Sayu Yagami
- Exte: Hair Extensions (2007) as Yuriko Shiina
- Shaolin Girl (2008) as Hikari Takahashi
- Drop in Ghost (2008)
- Love Exposure (2008) as Yōko
- Pride (2009) as Moe Midorikawa
- Be Sure to Share (2009) as Schoolgirl
- The Wonderful World of Captain Kuhio (2009) as Haru Yasuoka
- Kakera: A Piece of Our Life (2009) as Haru
- Rinco's Restaurant (2009)
- Sawako Decides (2010) as Sawako
- Villain (2010)
- Hara-Kiri: Death of a Samurai (2011) as Miho
- Tormented (2011) as Kiriko
- Smuggler (2011) as Tanuma Chiharu
- Moteki (2011)
- A Chorus of Angels (2012) as Manami
- The End of Summer (2013) as Tomoko
- Hello! Junichi (2014)
- Kakekomi (2015) as Ogin
- One Piece Film: Gold (2016) as Carina (voice)
- Traces of Sin (2017) as Mitsuko
- Umibe no Sei to Shi (2017) as Miho Shimao
- Mary and the Witch's Flower (2017) as The Red-Haired Witch (voice)
- The Bucket List (2019)
- Riverside Mukolitta (2022)
- I Am Makimoto (2022) as Tōko Tsumori
- Tang and Me (2022) as Emi
- Last Mile (2024) as Erena Funado
- On Summer Sand (2025) as Asako
- Bring Him Down to a Portable Size (2025) as Kanako
- The Last Blossom (2025), Nana Nagata in the past (voice)
- The Brightest Sun (2026) as Satoko

=== Animation ===
- Cocoon (2025) as Mayu

=== Television ===
- Ultraman Max (2005–2006) as Elly
- Dandori Musume (2006) as Ulala
- Beni no monshō (2006) as Ayako (2006)
- Burokkorii (2007)
- Kaette kita jikō keisatsu (2007) as Mitsuyo
- Kamen Rider Den-O (2007) as Yuka Sawada
- Kekkon sagishi (2007)
- Shakin Kanojo (2008)
- Hitomi (2008) as Junko
- Make The Last Wish (2008)
- Uramiya honpo reboot (2009)
- IRIS (2009) /dubbed for Kim So-yeon/
- Bloody Monday (2010) as Risa Kurano / Lisa
- Tsuki no Koibito ~Moon Lovers~ (2010) as Anzai Rina
- Moteki (2010) as Nakashiba Itsuka
- Dazai Osamu tanpen shōsetsu shū 3 (2010)
- Sayonara Bokutachi no Youchien (2011, TV Movie) as Yoshiki Mari
- Sunshine (2011)
- Soredemo, Ikite yuku (2011) as Futaba
- Kaitakushatachi (2012)
- Woman (2013) as Koharu
- Wakamono Tachi (2014) as Hikari
- Saving My Stupid Youth (2014) as Lisa
- Dokonjō Gaeru (2015) as Pyonkichi (voice)
- Totto TV (2016) as Tetsuko Kuroyanagi
- Kidnap Tour (2016)
- Quartet (2017) as Suzume
- Kangoku no Ohimesama (2017) as Futaba Wakai
- 10 Count to the Future (2022) as Aoi Orihara
- First Love (2022) as Yae Noguchi

== Awards ==
She has won the following awards for her performances:

Fant-Asia Film Festival

- 2009: Jury Prize: Best Female Performance – Love Exposure

Hochi Film Awards

- 2009: Best New Talent – Love Exposure, Pride, The Wonderful World of Captain Kuhio

International Drama Festival in Tokyo

- 2011: Best Supporting Actress – Moteki, Sayonara Bokutachi no Youchien
- 2014: Best Actress – Woman

Kinema Junpo Awards

- 2010: Best Supporting Actress – Love Exposure, Pride, The Wonderful World of Captain Kuhio

Mainichi Film Concours

- 2010: Sponichi Grand Prize: New Talent Award (shared with co-star Takahiro Nishijima) – Love Exposure

Yokohama Film Festival

- 2010: Best New Talent – Love Exposure, Pride, The Wonderful World of Captain Kuhio
- 2011: Best Actress – Love Vibes, Sawako Decides

Japanese Film Critics Awards

- 2016: Best Supporting Actress – Kakekomi
