= Pia Film Festival =

- Location: Tokyo, Japan
- Founded: 1977
- Website: https://pff.jp/jp/

The Pia Film Festival (Japanese: ぴあフィルムフェスティバル, Hepburn: Pia Firumu Festibaru) (also known as the PIA Film Festival or PFF for short) is an annual film festival established in 1977. According to film scholar Jasper Sharp, the festival "not only ranks as a vital hotbed from which the careers of some of Japan's most talented young filmmakers have been launched, but it also lays claim to being the first ever film festival in Japan."

== History ==
The festival was first held in 1977 as the Off Theater Film Festival by the Tokyo listings magazine Pia and initially functioned as one-off screening of independent movies made by young directors. Early jury members included Nagisa Oshima and Shuji Terayama, and the second festival featured such later star directors as Sogo Ishii, Yoshimitsu Morita, and Shunichi Nagasaki. According to Bryan Hartzheim writing in 2010, "many of the biggest directors of the last 20 years had their debuts at Pia." Other filmmakers who were screened at the PFF before making their professional debut include Joji Iida, Kiyoshi Kurosawa, Akihiko Shiota, Ryosuke Hashiguchi, Shinobu Yaguchi, Lee Sang-il, Naoko Ogigami, Kazuyoshi Kumakiri, Sion Sono, Naomi Kawase, and Yuya Ishii.

== PFF Award ==
The PFF Award Competition accepts submissions with "no restrictions whatsoever on the eligibility of its entrants" with no regard to whether the work is on film of video, is long or short, is fiction, documentary, or animation. For the 39th festival in 2017, 548 entries were received. Films in the Competition compete for several prizes, including the Grand Prize and the Runner-up Prize, awarded by a jury. The festival also features retrospectives of international filmmakers such as John Cassavetes and Lee Sang-woo.

== PFF Scholarship ==
Award winners at the PFF are eligible for the PFF Scholarship, which supports the production of one film for theatrical release each year. Begun in 1984, PFF Scholarship films include A Touch of Fever (1992), Down the Drain (1993), Hole in the Sky (2001), Border Line (2002), Yoshino's Barber Shop (2003), A Stranger of Mine (2005), Park and Love Hotel (2007), Sawako Decides (2009), and Household X (2010).

== Literature ==
- Bernardi, Joanne; Ogawa, Shota T. (2021). Routledge Handbook of Japanese Cinema. Routledge. ISBN 978-1-315-53437-4.
- McDonald, Keiko I. (2006). Reading a Japanese Film: Cinema in Context. Honolulu: University of Hawai’i Press. p. 12. ISBN 978-0-8248-2939-1.
- Mes, Tom (2023). Japanese Film and the Challenge of Video. NY: Routledge. ISBN 978-1-003-34681-4.
- Novielli, Maria Roberta (2022). Storia del cinema giapponese nel nuovo millennio. Venezia: Marsilio Editori. ISBN 978-88-297-1790-3.
