= Yoshihiko Hakamada =

Japanese actor (born 1973)

- 袴田 吉彦
- Born: 16 July 1973 (age 53); Hamamatsu, Shizuoka Prefecture, Japan
- Occupation: Actor
- Years active: 1991–present
- Agent: Platinum Production
- Notable work: The Cat Returns
- Spouse: Ai Kawanaka (m. 2010)
- Children: 1
- Awards: Junon Super Boy Contest Grand Prix Award (1991)

Yoshihiko Hakamada (袴田 吉彦, Hakamada Yoshihiko; born July 16, 1973) is a Japanese actor. He graduated from Hamana High School.

Hakamada was born in Hamamatsu, Shizuoka Prefecture. He is represented by Platinum Production. Hakamada's wife is tarento Ai Kawanaka.

== Discography ==
=== Singles ===
Year	Title
1999	"Hon To no Kimochi"

=== Albums ===
Year	Title
1999	Las Vegas First Class no Tabi

== Filmography ==
=== TV dramas ===
Year	Title	Role	Notes	Ref.
2004	Ultra Q: Dark Fantasy	Goichi Sakamoto	Lead role	
2009	The Waste Land	Shiro Hanawa		
2011	Gō	Toyotomi Hidenaga	Taiga drama	
2019	Your Turn to Kill	Yuzuru Kuzumi		
2023	Giver Taker	Toshikazu Ugajin		
2024	Extremely Inappropriate!	The master of a cafe		
2026	Extremely Inappropriate! Special	The master of a cafe	Television film	
2026	Shadows of the Ten Ninja	Unno Rokurō		

=== Films ===
Year	Title	Role	Notes	Ref.
1993	A Touch of Fever	Itsuki Shimamori	Lead role	
1995	Gamera: Guardian of the Universe	Michiya		
2002	The Cat Returns	Baron Humbert von Gikkingen (voice)		
2011	Isoroku	Yusaku Akiyama		
2021	Back to That Day			
2021	The Magic of Chocolate			
2021	Your Turn to Kill: The Movie	Yuzuru Kuzumi		
2024	Who's Gone	Numata		
2026	Goodbye, My Loved Ones!	Hideo Ohara		
2027	Last Dance			

=== Japanese dub ===
Year	Title	Role	Notes	Ref.
2000	Dinosaur	Aladar		

== See also ==
- Hideaki Itō (close friend)
- Gamon Kaai (close friend)
