= Kakekomi =

- Poster
- 駆込み女と駆出し男
- Directed by: Masato Harada
- Screenplay by: Masato Harada
- Starring: Yo Oizumi; Erika Toda; Hikari Mitsushima; Kirin Kiki; Shinichi Tsutsumi; Tsutomu Yamazaki
- Cinematography: Takahide Shibanushi
- Edited by: Yūjin Harada
- Music by: Harumi Fūki
- Distributed by: Shochiku
- Release date: May 16, 2015 (Japan)
- Running time: 143 minutes
- Country: Japan
- Language: Japanese
- Box office: ¥157.6 million (Japan)

Kakekomi (Japanese: 駆込み女と駆出し男, Hepburn: Kakekomi Onna to Kakedashi Otoko) is a 2015 Japanese jidaigeki drama film directed by Masato Harada. It was released in Japan on May 16, 2015.

== Cast ==
- Yo Oizumi as Shinjirō Nakamura
- Erika Toda as Jogo
- Hikari Mitsushima as Ogin
- Rina Uchiyama as Yū Togasaki
- Hana Hizuki as Hōshūni
- Midoriko Kimura as Okatsu
- Katsumi Kiba as Rihei
- Katsuo Nakamura as Kaze no Kinbei
- Tsutomu Yamazaki as Kyokutei Bakin

== Production ==
Kakekomi's screenplay was based on the novel Tokeiji Hanadayori by Hisashi Inoue.

The film was shot at Engyō-ji Temple in Himeji. Director Masato Harada first saw the location while filming The Last Samurai.

== Reception ==
On its opening weekend the film grossed ¥157.585 million at the Japanese box office. Zahraa Mubarak of 'High on Films' Website called Kakekomi "a shocking and intense experience" in her review of the film.
