= Toto Neechan =

Japanese television series

- Genre: Drama
- Written by: Masafumi Nishida
- Directed by: Taku Ōhara; Ken Okada; Hideki Fujinami; Takehiro Matsuzono; Man'yō Hashimoto; Yūsuke Horiuchi; Daisuke Andō; Takashi Fukagawa
- Starring: Mitsuki Takahata; Hidetoshi Nishijima; Tae Kimura; Itsuki Sagara; Hana Sugisaki; Pierre Taki; Kentaro Sakaguchi; Mitsuhiro Oikawa; Atsushi Itō; Osamu Mukai; Tsurutaro Kataoka; Mao Daichi; Toshiaki Karasawa
- Narrated by: Fumi Dan
- Opening theme: "Hanataba o Kimi ni" by Hikaru Utada
- Composer: Koji Endo
- Country of origin: Japan
- Original language: Japanese
- No. of episodes: 156

Production
- Executive producer: Masaru Ochiai
- Producer: Makoto Bonkobara
- Running time: 15 minutes

Original release
- Network: NHK
- Release: April 4 – October 1, 2016

Toto Neechan (とと姉ちゃん) is a Japanese television drama series and the 94th asadora on NHK. It premiered on April 4, 2016, and ended on October 1, 2016. The theme song is "Hanataba o Kimi ni" by Hikaru Utada.

== Plot ==
Tsuneko is the eldest of three daughters of Takezō and Kimiko Kohashi. When her father dies while she is only in her early teens, Tsuneko takes on the role of the father of the family, which earns her the nickname "Toto-neechan" (literally "Father older sister"). She cares for and protects her family during WWII and the early postwar era, graduating from school and eventually working as an editor at a publishing house. She eventually starts her own magazine offering advice to housewives and consumers about life and raising a family. With the help of the talented editor Isaji Hanayama, the magazine becomes a huge hit. Refusing to accept advertising, it becomes a model for a new form of consumer journalism.

The story is loosely based on the life of Shizuku Ōhashi, who founded the magazine Kurashi no techō, and the editor Yasuji Hanamori.

== Cast ==
Kohashi family

- Mitsuki Takahata as Tsuneko Kohashi
  - Mirai Uchida as young Tsuneko
- Itsuki Sagara as Mariko Kohashi
  - Kohaku Suda as young Mariko
- Hana Sugisaki as Yoshiko Kohashi
  - Himena Negishi and Rinko Kawakami as young Yoshiko
- Hidetoshi Nishijima as Takezō Kohashi, Tsuneko's father
- Tae Kimura as Kimiko Kohashi, Tsuneko's mother
- Osamu Mukai as Tetsurō Kohashi, Tsuneko's uncle

Aoyagi Company

- Mao Daichi as Takiko Aoyagi, Tsuneko's grandmother
- Tsurutaro Kataoka as Eitarō Kumai
- Takurō Ōno as Kiyoshi Aoyagi

Morita-ya

- Yoko Akino as Matsu Morita
- Pierre Taki as Sōkichi Morita
- Kami Hiraiwa as Teruyo Morita
- Rina Kawaei as Tomie Morita
- Kenta Hamano as Tetsunori Hasegawa

Other characters

- Junko Abe as Aya Nakada
- Kentaro Sakaguchi as Takezō Hoshino
- Hairi Katagiri as Chiyo Todō
- Toshiaki Karasawa as Isaji Hanayama
- Mitsuhiro Oikawa as Ichirō Gotanda
- Tomomitsu Yamaguchi as Seiji Tani
- Atsushi Itō as Shōhei Mizuta
- Toshio Kakei as Kunihiko Mizuta
- LaSalle Ishii as Hirofumi Ōsako
- Koutaro Tanaka as Yamada
- Erina Mano as Akemi Saotome
- Kyōko Maya as Raicho Hiratsuka
- Arata Furuta as Munenori Akabane
- Miyu Yoshimoto as Tamaki Mizuta
  - Aju Makita as young Tamaki (13 years old)
  - Kurumi Inagaki as young Tamaki (4 years old)
- Masato Yano
- Kanji Ishimaru
- Tōru Nomaguchi
- Shuhei Uesugi as Hiroaki Minami

Preceded by Asa ga Kita	Asadora; April 4, 2016 – October 1, 2016	Succeeded by Beppin-san
