= Itsuki Sagara =

Japanese actress (born 1995)

- 相楽 樹
- Born: March 4, 1995 (age 31); Saitama Prefecture, Japan
- Occupation: Actress
- Years active: 2010–2019
- Agent: Itoh Company
- Known for: Atami no Sōsa-kan; Toto Neechan
- Height: 1.62 m (5 ft 4 in)
- Spouse: Yuya Ishii (m. 2018)
- Children: 1
- Website: www.itoh-c.com/group/profile/prof_s/sagara/ (in Japanese)

Itsuki Sagara (相楽 樹, Sagara Itsuki; born March 4, 1995) is a retired Japanese actress who has appeared in a number of feature films, television series and stage plays.

== Career ==
Sagara was scouted in Takeshita street by Itoh Company during her third year junior high school's summer vacation in 2009.

In 2010 she had started her entertainment activities. Sagara's acting debut was in the drama Atami no Sōsa-kan in July. Later, on December 14 she released the photo album Hajimete no Suki.

After getting married in June 2018 and giving birth a year later, she left Ito Company and went on hiatus. In an interview with Shukan Josei in September 2020, Sagara stated that she has no plans of returning to acting and is focusing on her family.

== Personal life ==
In June 2018, Sagara announced through her agency that she had registered her marriage to filmmaker and director Yuya Ishii, and that she was pregnant. The couple have a twelve-year age difference. In late August 2019, she shared the news of the birth of their first child.

== Filmography ==
=== Films ===
Year	Title	Role	Notes	Ref.
2011	Naked Boys Short Movie vol. 1: Saigo no tsubuyaki	Airu		
2011	Gomennasai	Chiharu Shinomiya		
2011	Miss Boys! Kessen wa Kōshien!? Hen	Chihiro Sano		
2012	Miss Boys! Yūjō no Yukue-hen	Chihiro Sano		
2012	Riaru Onigokko 4	Tsukasa Wakaba		
2013	Good-bye Debussy	Lucia Katagiri		
2013	Sora kara Kita Tenkōsei	Mysterious angel		
2013	Hajimari no Michi	Yoshiko		
2013	Ada	Haruka Tamura		
2014	My Man	Akiko		
2014	Yugami. –Norowareta Heisa Kūkan– Tsunagaru	Misato	Lead role	
2014	Yokotawaru Kanojo	Midori Matsuura		
2015	Good Stripes	Sakura Yorozuya		
2015	Seven Days: Monday → Thursday	Tajiri		
2015	Seven Days: Friday → Sunday	Tajiri		
2018	Futatsu no Kinō to Boku no Mirai			

=== TV drama ===
Year	Title	Role	Network	Notes	Ref.
2010	Atami no Sōsa-kan	Mizu Atsuta	TV Asahi		
2010	GeGeGe no Nyōbō	Middle school girl	NHK	Week 23	
2010	Unubore Keiji	Saki Miyashita	TBS	Episode 10	
2011	Shakiin! Kansatsu Nisshi	Kyoko Suzuki	NHK-E	(Note: Aired in the TV series Shakiin!)	
2012	Yonimo Kimyōna Monogatari 2012-nen Haru no Tokubetsu-hen: Wata Ke Otoko		Fuji TV		
2012	Toshi Densetsu no Onna	Mika Fujita	TV Asahi	Episode 7	
2012	Usuzakura-ki	Koneko	NHK BS Premium	Episode 5	
2012	Doctor X: Gekai Michiko Daimon		TV Asahi	Episode 4	
2013	The Complex	Mami Shindo	TBS	Third Series Episode 4	
2013	Yamada-kun and the Seven Witches	Saeko Fukasawa	Fuji TV	Third Series Episode 4	
2014	Pale Moon	Yuko Ozaki (teenager)	NHK		
2014	Beniko Sezaimaru no Jiken-bo: Kuro Neko no Sankaku	Shiko Koguyama	Fuji TV		
2015	Tatakau! Shoten Girl	Schoolgirl	KTV	Episode 3	
2015	Soredemo Boku wa Kimi ga Suki	Tsukushi Makino	Fuji TV	Episode 2	
2016	Toto Neechan	Mariko (Kohashi) Mizuta	NHK		
2017	Kirawareru Yūki	Meiko Sōma	Fuji TV		
2018	When a Tree Falls	Kanae Ōtsuka	TV Asahi	TV movie	

=== Music programmes ===
Year	Title	Network	Notes
2016	Utacon	NHK	Sang "Aki Start! Kokoro ni shimiru Meikyoku Ketteihan"

=== Other TV programmes ===
Year	Title	Network	Notes
2016	Tetsudō KikōL Nippon Burari Tetsudō Tabi	NHK BS Premium	Episode 79; Traveler

=== Internet ===
Year	Title	Role	Website
2010	Himitsu no Kankei: Sensei wa Dōkyo Hito		BeeTV
2013	High School Drive: Me ga Sametara Kōkōseidatta	Shiori	BeeTV
2014	Zetsuosore Taikan Kimodameshi: Hōchō Onna		BeeTV

=== Advertisements ===
Year	Title	Ref.
2010	FamilyMart FamiMa no Fried Chicken	
2011	KDDI au Gangan Gakuwari	
2011	Calpis Calpis Water	
2012	Duskin Mister Donut	
2012	Yellow Hat	
2013	Matsumoto Kiyoshi	
2014	Sanko-Seika Yuki no Yado	
2014	Sanko-Seika Cheese Almond	
2014	Sanko-Seika Kaki no tane	
	Japan Airlines Roman Ryokō Okinawa vol. 1	

=== Music videos ===
Year	Title	Ref.
2013	Asian Kung-Fu Generation "Ima o Ikite"	
2014	7!! "Kono Hiroi Sora no Shita de"	
2014	7!! "Start Line"	
2014	Lyu:Lyu "Messiah"	
2015	7!! "Centimeter"	

=== Stage ===
Year	Title	Role	Ref.
2012	Locker Room ni Nemuru Boku no Shiranai Sensō	Yotsuba Higurashi	
2012	Summer Time	Ai	
2012	Subete no Yoru wa Asa e to Mukau	Chiharu	
2013	Hakushaku no orusuban	Hiyoko Sakuma	
2014	Candy	Asarika Takagi	
2014	Oen-sai –Kondo-san Dezuppari datte!?– Otōsan wa Jakunen-sei Kenbōshō		
2014	Wakaretemo Sukinahito 2014	Arisa	
2015	Natsu Hate Shiawase no Hate		
2015	Bull Docking Head Rock 15 Shūnenkinen Kōen Vol. 26: 1995		

=== Photo albums ===
Year	Title
2010	Hajimete no Suki
2014	Sorairo no Itsuki: DVD-tsuki Photobook

=== DVD ===
Year	Title
2011	Dōkyūsei
2011	Dōkyūsei 2
2012	Dōkyūsei 3
2012	Dōkyūsei 4
2013	Sorairo no Itsuki
2015	Dōkyūsei 4

== Bibliography ==
Title	Vol.
purepure	56
Up to boy	197
girls	31
memew	48
