= Masashi Endō =

Japanese actor (born 1974)

- Born: 2 April 1974 (age 52); Hokkaido, Japan
- Occupation: Actor
- Years active: 1993-present

Masashi Endō (遠藤雅, Endō Masashi; born 2 April 1974) is a Japanese actor. He is best known for appearing in the 1996 NHK serial drama Himawari. He has appeared in more than ten films since 1993, most notably in Wild Zero and Sawako Decides.

== Selected filmography ==
Film

Year	Title	Role	Notes
1993	A Touch of Fever		
1995	All Night Long 2		
2001	19		
2009	Sawako Decides		

Television

Year	Title	Role	Notes
2002	Toshiie and Matsu	Date Masamune	Taiga drama
2003	Himawari	Tatsuya	Asadora
