= Ai Kawanaka =

Japanese tarento and former gravure idol (born 1985)

- 河中 あい
- Born: 3 March 1985 (age 40); Tsuyama, Okayama, Japan
- Other names: Ai Hakamada (real name)
- Occupations: Tarento; actress
- Years active: 2004–
- Height: 155 cm (5 ft 1 in)
- Spouse: Yoshihiko Hakamada (m. 2010)
- Children: 1

Ai Kawanaka (河中 あい, Kawanaka Ai; born 3 March 1985) is a Japanese tarento and former gravure idol. Her real name is Ai Hakamada (袴田 麻系, Hakamada Ai; née Kawanaka (河中)).

== Biography ==
Kawanaka was born in Tsuyama, Okayama Prefecture. She debuted as a member of Bachicco!, a local idol unit based on Okayama and Kagawa Prefectures. They later disbanded in 2003.

Kawanaka later debuted as a gravure idol in 2004 in her real and former stage name Ai Kawanaka (河中 麻系).

In April 2007, she renamed into Ai Kawanaka (河中 あい) when she moved to an agency.

On 8 August 2010, Kawanaka married actor Yoshihiko Hakamada. Later in 23 August, it was announced that she was three months pregnant. On 18 February 2011, Kawanaka gave birth to a girl and became their first child.

While married, she left her affiliated office during her pregnancy.

In 2012, Kawanaka joins Space Craft Entertainment and returned as a "Mama Tarento".

== Filmography ==
=== TV programmes ===
Year	Title	Network
	Guadalcanal Taka no kochira Deru toko Henshū-bu	BS-TBS
	Gravure no Bishōjo	Mondo 21
	Idol no Hoshi	Enta! 371
	Idol Graphic TV	BS Fuji
2007	Mote Onna Body	TV Tokyo
2008	Uchūichi semai Jugyō	A'! Toodoroku Hōsōkyoku
2008	Ningen Kansatsu Quiz! Otona no Shikaku Special	NTV
2008	Kami Summers	TBS
2008	Arabikidan	TBS
2008	Shimura Yadesu.	Fuji TV
2009	Nekketsu!! Golf Joshi-bu	TV Asahi
2010	Ariken	TV Tokyo
2010	Ueda Channel 24-Jikan kurai TV	TV Asahi
2010	Ryūma ni Ai ni Iku! 2-Paku 3-nichi no Drive Tabi	BS Japan
2010	Kyaīn no Kyakure-ya	
2012	Oh! Do ya Kao Summit	TV Asahi
2012	Odoru! Sanma Goden!!	NTV
2016	Kaiketsu! Ni-Ni Answer	NTV

=== Internet ===
Title	Website
sg TV	
Desktop Gyaru Collection	Digital Adventure
Yoshiharu Noda no Sexy Magazine	GyaO
Bibus	Gakken

== Works ==
=== DVD ===
Year	Title
2004	F Cup Bishōjo Geneki Kōkōsei Series: Ai Sotsugyō
2004	NatuLove
2004	Pure Smile
2005	Shining Star
2005	Yume Monogatari
2005	Love Life
2005	Ai Hōnetsu
2006	Ai Love You
2006	One
2006	Bijo-H Heroine
2006	Last Stage
2007	Harvest
2007	Ai Rakuen
2008	Love Time
2008	Love Dream
2008	Pure Heart
2008	Pureself
2010	New Stage –Ai ga Tomaranai–

=== Photo albums ===
Year	Title	Book code
2004	NatuLove	ISBN 978-4-86046-084-6
2005	EyePression	ISBN 978-4-89829-796-4
