= A Touch of Fever =

1993 Japanese film by Ryosuke Hashiguchi

- Directed by: Ryōsuke Hashiguchi
- Written by: Ryōsuke Hashiguchi
- Produced by: Akira Ishigaki
- Starring: Yoshihiko Hakamada; Masashi Endō; Reiko Kataoka; Sumiyo Yamada
- Cinematography: Jun'ichi Tozawa
- Edited by: Hiroshi Matsuo
- Music by: Akira Isono; Ryūji Murayama; Kōhei Shinozaki
- Release dates: 23 June 1993 (France); 4 September 1993 (Japan)
- Running time: 114 minutes
- Country: Japan
- Language: Japanese

A Touch of Fever (二十才の微熱, Hatachi no Binetsu; lit. Slight Fever of a 20-Year-Old) is a Japanese film directed by Ryosuke Hashiguchi, starring Yoshihiko Hakamada and Masashi Endō. It was released in 1993.

It was shot on 16 millimeter film with a small budget and no payment for the actors or the director. It was awarded a PFF Scholarship (which supports the production of one film for theatrical release each year). It was then screened in Berlin Film Festival.

== Plot ==
Tatsuru and Shinichirō are two young male hustlers in Japan. The older one, Tatsuru, disconnects himself from his emotions in order to perform his job. The younger Shinichirō, meanwhile, grows uncomfortable with the work once he has fallen in love with Tatsuru. After Shinichirō gets thrown out of his parents' house, he stays at Tatsuru's apartment, and their once casual relationship awkwardly develops into something else.

== Cast ==
- Yoshihiko Hakamada as Tatsuru Shimamori
- Masashi Endō as Shinichirō Miyajima
- Reiko Kataoka as Yoriko Suzuki
- Sumiyo Yamada as Atsumi
- Kōji Satō as Master
- Bunmei Harada as Kawakubo
- Kōta Kusano as Takashi
- Yōichi Kawaguchi as Ōta
- Hiroshi Okōchi as Customer
- Tarō Ishida as Yoriko's Father
- Wakaba Irie as Yoriko's Mother

== Reception ==
=== Reaction in Japan ===
The film was a commercial success, surprising given its subject matter. It was nothing less than a breakthrough for real life gay-oriented films in Japan, as well as Okoge (1992) and Kira kira Hikaru (also known as Twinkle) in 1992. The film also introduced the word 'gay' into Japanese society.
