= Hyper Groove Party =

Compilation album by Folder 5
- Released: January 22, 2003

Folder 5 chronology
FIVE GIRLS	Hyper Groove Party

Hyper Groove Party is a Folder 5 album released on January 22, 2003. It is a collection of mixed, shortened versions of their songs.

Hyper Groove Party is the first remix album released by Folder 5 that features all the songs that have been done by Folder 5. The album reached No. 12 on the Oricon Albums Chart and charted for five weeks, selling 24,624 copies.

== Track listing ==
1. "Ready!"
2. "AMAZING LOVE"
3. "GEMINI"
4. "Follow me"
5. "Final Fun"-Boy
6. "BE MY LOVE"
7. "CATENACCIO"
8. "SUPERGIRL"
9. "Koi No Kakera..."(Featuring MOE)
10. "Baby My Heart"
11. "Turn to you" (Featuring HIKARI)
12. "MY MIRACLE"
13. "ADVENTURE"
14. "Piece of wish"
15. "Depend on you"
16. "Still reminds me of you"
17. "Midnight Train" (Featuring ARISA)
18. "Shakunetu" ~SUMMER BIRTHDAY~
19. "Magical Eyes"
20. "Wonders" (Featuring NATSU)
21. "GO AHEAD!!"
22. "STAY"
23. "Chance & Lucky"
24. "Break the silence"
25. "Liar"
26. "HEART BEAT"
27. "IT'S UP TO YOU"
28. "Believe"
29. "Precious Love"
30. "FAKE"
