= Sawako Decides =

- Japanese Sawako Decides poster
- Directed by: Yuya Ishii
- Written by: Yuya Ishii
- Produced by: Mayumi Amano
- Starring: Hikari Mitsushima; Masashi Endō; Kira Aihara
- Cinematography: Yukihiro Okimura
- Edited by: Koichi Takahashi
- Music by: Samon Imamura
- Production companies: PFF (PIA Film Festival) Partners; Tokyo Broadcasting System Television; Tokyo FM; Imagica; Avex Entertainment Inc. USEN Corporation
- Release date: July 30, 2009 (PIA Film Festival)
- Running time: 111 minutes
- Country: Japan
- Language: Japanese

Sawako Decides (Japanese: 川の底からこんにちは, Hepburn: Kawa no Soko kara Konnichiwa; lit. "Hello from the bottom of the river") is a 2009 Japanese comedy-drama film directed by Yuya Ishii. The film stars Hikari Mitsushima as Sawako.

Sawako Decides premiered in Tokyo at the PIA Film Festival in 2009. At the Fantasia Film Festival, the film won the award for Best Feature Film and Best Actress for Hikari Mitsushima.

== Plot ==
In present-day Tokyo, 23-year-old Sawako Kimura (Hikari Mitsushima) is in her fifth part-time job and with her fifth boyfriend since leaving high school. Kenichi Arai (Masashi Endō) is a second-rate designer at the toy company where Sawako works, and has a four-year-old daughter, Kayoko (Kira Aihara). Kenichi keeps pressing Sawako to marry him, but she considers him "only average" (as indeed she considers herself "nothing special"), and on top of that she dislikes children.

At the same time, Sawako's uncle, Nobuo (Ryo Iwamatsu) keeps phoning, asking her to return to her hometown, as her father Tadao (Kotaro Shiga) is dying from cirrhosis of the liver and wants her to take over the failing freshwater clam packing company he owns. When Kenichi is fired from his toy-designer job, he persuades the reluctant Sawako to accept the offer to return home, and to take him and Kayoko along into the bargain. The trio arrive in the Pacific coast town of Kawaminami in southern Japan, where Sawako finds herself scorned by the womenfolk for having run away from home five years earlier with her high school tennis club captain, Yoshio (Ryu Morioka).

At this point Sawako is forced to decide what she wants to do with the company, Kenichi, Kayoko, and her whole life.

== Production ==
Actress Hikari Mitsushima found the story of the film amusing and personally negotiated with director Yuya Ishii, saying that he would "regret it if he didn't cast me."

Hikari Mitsushima and Yuya Ishii subsequently married in late 2010. They divorced in 2016.

== Release ==
Sawako Decides premiered at the PIA Film Festival in Tokyo on July 30, 2009. It premiered theatrically in Japan on May 1, 2010.

Sawako Decides had its North American premiere at the New York Asian Film Festival on July 1, 2010. It was shown in the United Kingdom at the London Film Festival in October 2010.

== Reception ==
At the Fantasia Film Festival, the film won the award for Best Feature Film and Best Actress for Hikari Mitsushima. Total Film gave the film three stars out of five, noting that the film's "jokes occasionally get lost in translation". The Guardian gave the film two stars out of five, stating that the film is "somewhere between funny and irritating". The Hollywood Reporter gave the film a mixed review by praising Mitsushima's acting, while stating that the film "does not challenge the status quo that makes life so miserable for non-achievers."
