= Love Vibes =

Japanese manga by Erica Sakurazawa

- Japanese cover for the manga
- Genre: Romance, Yuri
- Manga
- Written by: Erica Sakurazawa
- Published by: Shueisha
- Magazine: Young You
- Published: September 19, 1996
- Volumes: 1
- Live-action film

Kakera: A Piece of Our Life (カケラ)
- Released: April 3, 2010

Love Vibes is a Japanese manga by Erica Sakurazawa. It was adapted into a 2009 live action film titled Kakera: A Piece of Our Life.

== Plot ==
Shouji has a girlfriend but is seeing Mako on the side. Unable to continue pretending she feels less for him than she does, she breaks it off with him. Shortly before that happens, Mako is hit on by Mika, who tells Mako that she's interested in both men and women. Mika wants to pursue a relationship with Mako, but is Mako's relationship with Shouji really over?

== Media ==
=== Manga ===
Love Vibes began as a manga series written and illustrated by Erica Sakurazawa, which began serialization in Shueisha Young You manga magazine. The first bound volume was released on September 19, 1996.

=== Kakera (film) ===
Kakera (カケラ), the 2009 live action film adaptation of Love Vibes, had its world premiere on 7 October 2009 at the 17th Raindance Film Festival (London); It was released in Japan on 3 April 2010, following the theatrical release in March 2010.

Directed by Momoko Ando and produced by Zero Pictures, it stars Hikari Mitsushima and Eriko Nakamura. The movie was distributed in the United Kingdom by Third Window Films as Kakera: A Piece of Our Life.

The DVD was released on 21 June 2010.

==== Cast and characters ====
- Hikari Mitsushima as Haru Kitagawa
- Eriko Nakamura as Riko Sakata
- Tasuku Nagaoka as Ryota Shinoduka
- Ken Mitsuishi as Syogo Sakata
- Toshie Negishi as Keiko Sakata
- Masahiko Tsugawa as Tanaka
- Rino Katase as Toko Yamashiro

== See also ==
- List of LGBT-related films
- List of LGBT-related films directed by women
- Lists of manga
