= Yuya Ishii (director) =

Japanese filmmaker (born 1983)

- 石井 裕也
- Born: June 21, 1983 (age 42); Saitama Prefecture, Japan
- Occupations: Movie director; writer
- Years active: 2005–present
- Spouses: Hikari Mitsushima (m. 2010; div. 2016); Itsuki Sagara (m. 2018)
- Children: 1

Yuya Ishii (石井 裕也, Ishii Yūya; born 21 June 1983) is a Japanese film director, writer, editor, producer and actor best known for his 2013 movie The Great Passage for which he won best director at the 2013 Japanese Academy Awards.

== Biography ==
Ishii was born in Urawa City, Saitama Prefecture on June 21, 1983. He is the second of two brothers and was raised by a single father after his mother succumbed to an illness when he was young.

== Personal life ==
Yuya Ishii won best director at the 2010 Blue Ribbon Awards, and the movie also resulted in his marriage in late 2010 to the lead actress Hikari Mitsushima, a former member of the J-pop group member Folder 5 and actress in such films as Death Note (2006) and Love Exposure (2008). They divorced in 2016.

In June 2018, Ishii shared the news that he had remarried actress Itsuki Sagara, who is twelve years younger than him, and that they were already expecting their first child. A year later in late August 2019, it was announced that his wife had given birth to their first child. His wife has also since retired from acting to focus on their family.

== Filmography ==
=== Films ===
- Rebel, Jiro's Love (2006)
- Girl Sparks (2007)
- Of Monster Mode (2007)
- Bare-assed Japan (2007)
- To Walk Beside You (2009)
- Sawako Decides (2010)
- Mitsuko Delivers (2011)
- Azemichi no dandi (2011)
- The Great Passage (2013)
- The Vancouver Asahi (2014)
- Our Family (2014)
- The Tokyo Night Sky Is Always the Densest Shade of Blue (2017)
- Almost a Miracle (2019)
- All the Things We Never Said (2020)
- The Asian Angel (2021)
- A Madder Red (2021)
- Masked Hearts (2023)
- The Moon (2023)
- The Real You (2024)
- One Last Love Letter (2026)
- The Secret Battlefield (2026)

=== Television ===
- When a Tree Falls (2018)
- Simulation: Defeat in the Summer of 1941 (2025)

== Awards ==
Asian Film Awards

- 2008 - Edward Yang New Talent
- 2018 - "Best Director" - The Tokyo Night Sky Is Always the Densest Shade of Blue

Blue Ribbon Awards

- 2011 - "Best Director" - Sawako Decides

Japanese Academy Awards

- 2013 - "Best Director" - The Great Passage

Mainichi Film Award

- 2013 - "Best Director" - The Great Passage

Kinema Junpo Award

- 2013 - "Best Director" - The Great Passage
