= SD Blu-ray =

Disc with standard-definition video

Standard Definition Blu-ray aka SD Blu-ray disc (SD-BD) is a Blu-ray disc on which the main feature is standard-definition video instead of the high-definition video found on typical Blu-ray discs.

This is often due to the highest quality version of the feature content only being available in standard definition. This can include content that was shot on standard definition video, animation produced digitally in standard definition, or a television program that was shot on film but edited onto SD video with the original film subsequently lost or impractical to re-transfer. Standard definition content uses much less disc space than a pre-rendered upscale would, reducing the number of discs required, and the manufacturing costs in turn, for longer titles. The "SD on BD" release of Samurai Pizza Cats, for example, contains all 52 episodes on a single disc rather than the 8 DVDs used for the previous release.

Despite being the same resolution, SD video presented on Blu-ray has the potential to look better than the DVD equivalent due to the availability of superior video codecs and higher bitrates. The AVC and VC-1 codecs available for Blu-ray both offer superior picture quality at a given bitrate than the older MPEG2 codec used on DVD (or comparable quality at lower bitrates). Content that might have been over-compressed on DVD with noticeable compression artifacts need not exhibit those artifacts on Blu-ray, resulting in a more faithful and detailed reproduction of the original source master. However, the playback quality of an SD encode can vary depending on the upscaling quality of the viewer's own equipment and will generally not be as good as a pre-upscaled encoding.

Blu-ray Disc titles can combine standard definition video with high definition audio tracks. Lossless audio is more practical and flexible on Blu-ray than on DVD, which only supports lossless PCM in 48 kHz stereo and requires a relatively large amount of data, leaving less storage space available for the video. In contrast, Blu-ray supports lossless multi-channel audio in multiple formats and the larger storage makes its inclusion much more practical without impacting video quality. Several standard definition concert recordings have been released on Blu-ray to take advantage of the superior sound quality available, despite there being little benefit to the video. Some publishers also take advantage of the higher quality PGS subtitle format offered by Blu-ray.
