= Folder 5 =

Japanese idol group

Folder5
- Origin: Japan
- Genres: Japanese Pop
- Years active: 2000–2003 (presumed)
- Labels: avex trax
- Members: Arisa Nakama; Hikari Mitsushima; Akina Miyazato; Natsu Aka; Moe Ishihara

Folder 5 (also spelled Folder5) (フォルダファイヴ Forudafaivu) was a five-girl Japanese pop idol group on the Avex Trax music label. The group's music was known for its Eurobeat style. The band's music was produced by Takashi Kimura.

== Band History ==
Folder 5 was a spinoff group from another J-pop group Folder, also signed to Avex. Along with the five girls, Folder also had two male members, Daichi and Joe. Daichi and Joe left the band due to puberty. Folder then became Folder 5. In 2000 they released their first single, "SUPERGIRL". Their third single, "Believe", was used as the second opening theme for the popular anime One Piece. The song "Ready!" from their fourth single "Stay..." was used as the theme song in the short "Jango's Dance Carnival" that was shown with One Piece's second movie, "Clockwork Island Adventure". They also made frequent appearances on the show Yoru mo Hippare. Their song "Magical Eyes" was also used as the opening theme for the Xbox game Nezmix, also known in North America and Europe as Sneakers, though it was removed in all English releases, due to licensing issues. After the release of their 8th single, "MY MIRACLE," in May 2002, they have, as of 2005, released no more singles. It appears as though they have disbanded, although no official announcements were ever made.

On March 21, 2012, "BEST COLLECTION ALBUM" was released and included all of their singles and coupling songs. It also included all of their music videos.

== Post-Breakup ==
Akina began her career as a solo artist in 2002. To date, she has released three singles. Hikari signed on with the talent agency Paretto to become a TV personality. Arisa began her solo career on the indies scene in 2006, which lasted until her retirement 2009 after getting married.

== Members ==
- Akina Miyazato
- Arisa Nakama
- Hikari Mitsushima
- Natsu Aka
- Moe Ishihara

== Discography ==
=== Singles ===
- "Supergirl" [released May 10, 2000]
- "Amazing Love" [released August 23, 2000]
- "Believe" [released November 29, 2000]
- "Stay..." [released March 14, 2001]
- "Final Fun-Boy" [released June 13, 2001]
- "Go Ahead!!" [released November 14, 2001]
- "Magical Eyes" [released March 6, 2002]
- "My Miracle" [released May 29, 2002]

=== Albums ===
- Hyper Groove 1 [released July 25, 2001]
- Five Girls [released July 17, 2002]
- Hyper Groove Party [released January 22, 2003]
- Folder+Folder5 Complete Box [released June 25, 2003]

=== DVDs ===
- Hyper Groove Clips [released December 12, 2001]
- Hyper Groove Clips 2 [released March 19, 2003]
- Folder+Folder5 Complete Box [released June 25, 2003]
