= Nurse Angel Ririka SOS =

Media franchise based on manga of the same name

- First volume cover

ナースエンジェルりりかSOS (Nāsu Enjeru Ririka EsuŌEsu)
- Genre: Magical girl
- Manga
- Written by: Yasushi Akimoto
- Illustrated by: Koi Ikeno
- Published by: Shueisha
- Magazine: Ribon
- Original run: January 1995 – June 1996
- Volumes: 4
- Anime television series
- Directed by: Akitaro Daichi
- Studio: Studio Gallop
- Original network: TV Tokyo
- Original run: July 7, 1995 – March 8, 1996
- Episodes: 35

Nurse Angel Ririka SOS (ナースエンジェルりりかSOS, Nāsu Enjeru Ririka EsuŌEsu) is a Japanese manga series created by music producer and television writer Yasushi Akimoto and manga creator Koi Ikeno. The manga was serialized in Shueisha's shōjo manga magazine Ribon from January 1995 to June 1996, and subsequently collected into four bound volumes published by Shueisha. The story follows Ririka Moriya, an elementary school student who receives the power to transform into the legendary guardian, Nurse Angel. As Nurse Angel, she is the only person capable of protecting the Earth from world-destroying invaders.

NAS and TV Tokyo produced a 35-episode anime television series based on the manga. The animation for the series was handled by Studio Gallop. The show aired on TV Tokyo affiliates from July 1995 to March 1996. Additional media produced include novelizations and a theatrical musical that aired in digest form in the show's time slot after its conclusion.

== Plot ==
Ririka Moriya is a bubbly, clumsy 4th grader who has a crush on Nozomu Kanou, a transfer student from England. On her 10th birthday, Nozomu gives her a magical nurse cap, which allows Ririka to transform into the heavenly guardian, Nurse Angel. Nozomu later tells her that his real name is Kanon, and he comes from the planet Queen Earth, which has been overrun and mass-polluted by the evil Dark Joker Organization. He was sent to find the legendary Nurse Angel, who would save both Earth and Queen Earth from destruction by finding the Flower of Life (命の花 Inochi no Hana). With help from Nozomu and her friend/neighbor Seiya Uzaki, Ririka learns to fight as Nurse Angel to protect her friends.

== Characters ==
=== Main characters ===
==== Ririka Moriya ====
- Voiced by: Kaori Asoh

Ririka Moriya (森谷りりか, Moriya Ririka) is a cheerful, outgoing girl who wants to be a nurse when she grows up. She is a 4th grade student at White Dove Academy (白鳩学園), a school of some repute. Ririka lives with her parents, grandmother, and her little brother. In the course of the series a dog, Herb, joins the family. She loves Kanou and is oblivious to Seiya's love for her.
Ririka uses the magical phrase, "Holy Power, Holy Prayer, be here!" (聖なる力、聖なる願い、ここへ！, Seinaru chikara, seinaru negai, koko e!) to transform into Nurse Angel. In the manga, she both says this line and places the nurse cap on her head, the cap simply appears in the anime. After transforming, Ririka appears older after she transforms, with her hair longer and her demeanor more serious. Nurse Angel's primary weapon is a baton, and she can perform a wide variety of energy attacks. Her source of power for these attacks is a powerful healing agent called Green Vaccine, which is made from the Flower of Life. In the anime, she has a finite supply of Green Vaccine, and once it is gone there is very little she can do as Nurse Angel.

==== Seiya Uzaki ====
- Voiced by: Akira Ishida

Seiya Uzaki (宇崎星夜, Uzaki Seiya) is Ririka's next-door neighbor, childhood friend, and classmate. He is the son of a doctor and aspires to follow in his father's footsteps. Though he is not good at studying and is the class clown, the turn of the head is fast. He likes video games, playing sports, and teasing Ririka. He is honest with himself about his affection for Ririka and will go to any length to protect her. While Ririka and Kanou initially hide their secret war from Seiya, he eventually finds out. He later is entrusted with power and a mission by Kanon and becomes Nurse Angel's number one supporter. He uses Psionics, and his clothes do not change into a Battle costume. He uses a boomerang in the manga.

==== Kanon ====
- Voiced by: Hidehiro Kikuchi

Kanon (加納望/カノン, Kanon) is an emissary from Queen Earth who was sent by Queen Helena to search for the Flower of Life and the legendary Nurse Angel. He a uses sword and Psionics. In his earthly disguise, Nozomu Kanou (Kanōu Nozomu), he is a 6th grader at White Dove Academy. Kanon becomes Ririka's mentor after she accepts her duty as Nurse Angel, but he doubts whether she is capable of managing that task without him. In the anime he is a serious, duty-bound character - he rarely smiles, and mostly only at Ririka. Kanon was undermined in Black Vaccine and knows that one's life is short and One's Psionics is given to Seiya in hopes to defend Ririka and he suffers a fatal injury by Keto and refuses treatment of Green Vaccine and dies. He is later resurrected by Dark Joker and fights Nurse Angel, but she turns him back and he returns to Queen Earth and Queen Helena.

=== Secondary Characters ===
==== Queen Helena ====
- Voiced by: Yuri Amano

Queen Helena (ヘレナ王女, Herena Ōjo) is the Queen Earth royal who sent Kanon to Earth in search of Nurse Angel. She occasionally supports Ririka by using telepathy. The state of Queen Earth is reflected in Helena, and thus she is gravely ill. Kanon is a childhood friend and her lover. Though she is holding off the Black Vaccine of Dark Joker's invasion to the Queen Earth somehow by her own power, her state also gradually becomes aggravated as long as the Flower of Life is not found.

==== Karin Mizuhara ====
- Voiced by: Kaoru Suzuki

Karin Mizuhara (水原花林, Mizuhara Karin) is a spunky, temperamental girl, and one of Ririka's close friend and classmate, who often hangs out with Ririka and Anna at school. Karin has made it her purpose in life to visit popular eateries that are staffed by "cool guys."

==== Anna Kazami ====
- Voiced by: Azusa Nakao

Anna Kazami (風見安奈, Kazami Anna) is Ririka's other close friend and classmate. She is, in many ways, the opposite of Karin; always speaking in a very polite fashion even to her friends. Together with Karin, she gives Ririka and Seiya relationship advice.

==== Miyuki Kuwano ====
- Voiced by: Emiko Matsuoka

Miyuki Kuwano (桑野みゆき, Kuwano Miyuki) is a 4th grader at White Dove Academy and the daughter of the head of Kuwano General Hospital. Though she often boasts of that, however, she feels lonely that her father can rarely care of her because of his job. She has a strong dislike of dogs.
She also has formed a shin'eitai (親衛隊 - fan club/official guard) for Kanō with a couple of her flunkies. Because Senpai and Ririka are intimate with each other, she is ignored. She approach Senpai single-mindedly. Making atmosphere of the sacred school into pride, she often turn on Ririka and Seiya spoiling the atmosphere and she calls Ririka a "barbarian". However, she likes Ririka on some pretext or other.

==== Mimina ====
- Voiced by: Noriko Namiki

Mimina (ミミナ) is Queen Helena's younger sister, who decides to come to Earth posing as Kanou's little sister in order to chastise Ririka for not doing a good enough job. Mimina develops a crush on Seiya much to his (and Ririka's) dismay . In the anime Mimina is accompanied by Maruru, who serves as her advisor/servant.

==== Maruru ====
- Voiced by: Junko Shimakata

Maruru (マルル) is a creature from Queen Earth that resembles a stuffed animal.

==== Dewey ====
- Voiced by: Yuriko Fuchizaki

Dewey (デューイ) is a former member of Dark Joker who was betrayed by Bross. Dewey is a skilled swordsman who seemed to be about the same age as Kanon, and thinks of the battle for Earth in the terms of a game. He prefers simple contests of might over elaborate schemes, and is a bitter rival with Keto. After being betrayed, he is saved by Ririka with one of her few remaining Green Vaccines, and he subsequently returns the favor by destroying the container containing Black Vaccine in Bross' Castle, and returning it to Ririka. He gradually warms up to Ririka and Seiya, and the people surrounding him, becoming a reassuring companion who fights with Ririka and Seiya against the Dark Joker.

==== "Inchō" Akasegawa ====
- Voiced by: Ryunosuke Ohbayashi

"Inchō" Akasegawa ("院長" 赤瀬川) is a comical anime-only inpatient at Uzaki Hospital. He has been hospitalized for so long he has the nickname Inchō, or Inpatient Chief. Despite this, he seems to be in very good health.

==== "Shijin" Nishitokorozawa ====
- Voiced by: Tsutomu Kashiwakura

"Shijin" Nishitokorozawa ("詩人" 西所沢) is an anime-only hospital inpatient. He earned his nickname because he tends to wax poetic or, more often than not, melodramatic.

==== "Great" Yamazaki ====
- Voiced by: Hidehiro Kikuchi

"Great" Yamazaki ("グレート" 山崎) is the third member of the anime-exclusive inpatient trio. He is a beefy fellow who is often seen with a barbell in one hand and an IV stand in the other. His nickname seems to be inspired by his tough-guy talk, but he is in fact a coward.

=== Dark Joker ===
==== Buros ====
- Voiced by: Ryo Horikawa

Buros (ブロス, Burosu) is the main antagonist in both the manga and anime as the leader of Dark Joker. He is remorseless and an imposing being who dwells in a strange, amorphous palace in Earth's orbit. Buros' goal is to eliminate all life in the universe.

==== Keto ====
- Voiced by: Kouji Ishii

Keto (ケトー Ketō) is one of Buros' lackeys. He is a plotter, often employing disguises and taking advantage of innocents in order to catch his enemies off-guard. He is often accompanied by a black cat and is dedicated to winning Buros' favor by outdoing Dewey.

==== Legi ====
Legi (レギ Regi) is a manga-only character who is Buros' younger brother. He is handsome and a bit of a casanova.

== Musical ==
For three weeks after the anime completed, footage of the Nurse Angel Ririka SOS musical was shown in its timeslot. Actress Kanako Irie (入絵加奈子, Irie Kanako) stars as Ririka - she also appears in the film Kamikaze Girls. The three episodes are as follows:

- Where is the Flower of Life? (命の花はどこに, Inochi no Hana wa Doko ni)
- Say, Please Remember (ねえ 思い出して, Nee Omoidashite)
- Because You're Always at My Side (いつもそばにいるから, Itsumo Soba ni Iru kara)

Preceded by Akazukin Chacha (January 7th, 1994 - June 30th, 1995)	TV Tokyo Friday 18:00 Timeframe Nurse Angel Ririka SOS (July 7th, 1995 – March 8th, 1996)	Succeeded by Kodomo no Omocha (April 5th, 1996 – March 27th, 1998)
