= A Devil and Her Love Song =

Japanese manga series

- North American cover of the first manga volume

悪魔とラブソング (Akuma to Rabu Songu)
- Genre: Coming-of-age, romance
- Manga
- Written by: Miyoshi Tomori
- Published by: Shueisha
- English publisher: Viz Media
- Magazine: Margaret
- Original run: 25 July 2007 – 25 May 2011
- Volumes: 13

A Devil and Her Love Song (悪魔とラブソング, Akuma to Rabu Songu) is a shōjo manga by Miyoshi Tomori first serialized in Biweekly Margaret and licensed by Viz Media.

== Plot ==
Maria Kawai transfers to Totsuka High School after being expelled from her previous school St. Katria - a catholic school for girls. Upon entering the classroom and hearing the students gossip, she bluntly states that the reason for her expulsion was an act of violence on her teacher.

The sharp tongue and frank nature hidden under her pretty face immediately makes Maria an outcast among her classmates. Nevertheless, Maria hopes for a fresh start. She manages to become close with two of her classmates after they hear her beautiful singing. One is Yusuke Kanda, who's kind and friendly to everyone on the outside, but inside isn't that way at all. He teaches her how to put a "lovely spin" on everything, to help her get along with others better, but it just makes her seem even more intimidating. The other is Shin Meguro, a tall, dark-haired boy who's always frowning, and also comes from a family of musicians, able to recognize the songs Maria sings. Throughout the year, Maria faces many problems, mainly relating to getting along with others, but soon resolves it with the constant help of her friends and bluntness.

== Characters ==
Maria Kawai
The protagonist of the story, Maria has a cold personality which estranges herself from her classmates. She says what she wants, albeit too bluntly and harsh, even when she intends to help others. Her arrogant facade and point blank statements are the reasons she is hated by most people and it seems she too is indifferent towards them. Maria is also shown to have the ability to see the true natures of people around her, or more simply, their flaws. Although she maintains this air of superiority, she actually yearns for acceptance and friendship. Even when knowing the unpleasant outcomes, she often steps into troublesome situations just to prove herself to others. Because of her general attitude, she is given the nickname "Devil Maria". While she gives special regard Yusuke, but exhibits much stronger feelings for Shin, eventually falling in love with him. She likes nursery rhymes and hymns like "Amazing Grace." She has a habit of pushing out her lips and having her eyes half open when someone says something that annoys her. She keeps on her at all times a cross that was given to her by the nun she had punched, which got her expelled in the firsthand, representing her desire for a deeper bond with others.
Shin Meguro
Shin dislikes drawing attention to himself and prefers to observe situations. He is often cold and aloof towards his classmates, and Yusuke's constant pestering irritates him. At first, he treated Maria with disdain, appearing to want nothing to do with her, but circumstances proved otherwise and he starts to actually care greatly for her. He pretends to be "rude" to Maria thinking that his actions would somehow lead the other girls to sympathize with her. Despite claiming that he does not want anything to do with her, he finds himself falling in love with Maria, but not wanting her to discover these feelings. It is later revealed his "loner" persona comes from an incident when he was a kid where he "choked" during his large piano debut making the media destroy his image. He ends up becoming overprotective to a fault in his desire to protect Maria, in particularly once he discovers the secret behind Maria's past and her trauma.
Yusuke Kanda
Yusuke is a bubbly and cheerful person, who is popular with the girls and generally well-liked. Much to Shin's chagrin, Yusuke always has an idiotic grin pasted on his face. Initially, he develops a liking for Maria as she is very beautiful and has an intriguing personality. He is the first student to approach her and constantly pops up wherever she is. Yusuke taught Maria how to put a "lovely spin" on things. He calls Shin "Megu-chin" and Maria, "Maria-chi". His face forms a comical style with thick dark outlined eyes and a w-shaped smiled when someone, mainly Maria, is blatantly against one of his ideas. He confesses his love to Maria, however she turns him down. Recognizing Maria and Shin's mutual like for each other, he proceeds to support their relationship, though deep down feeling jealous due to his own feelings.
Tomoyo Kousaka
One of Maria's classmates, she is first introduced with the nickname "Nippachi", due to always getting a "28" on her tests and for always grinning. She is the complacent type who adapts to those around her, treated incredibly poorly by the other girls in her class, but puts up with their taunts and actions with a smile in order to fit in. Her clique attempt to use Tomoyo in order to cause trouble for Maria, something that Maria is able to see right through, including Tomoyo's hidden contempt for all of them. After her breakdown after Maria forces her to recognize her true feelings, she began to show a somewhat forceful side, and starts being more open about her thoughts, becoming Maria's other close friend. In contrast to Maria, she likes skull style fashion, black things, and overall gothic aesthetic, constantly pressuring Maria to embrace it.
Ayu Nakamura
Ayu cares a lot about how she looks and takes a long time doing her makeup and hair in the morning. Because of her ego and jealousy over Maria's looks, she tries to make Maria look bad in front of the class. Maria's classmates, excluding Yuusuke and Shin, start to hate Kawai even more because of Ayu. But when Maria's words help Ayu confess her love to Yuusuke, she realizes Maria isn't too bad.
Teacher
He is their homeroom teacher and usually is shown to have no real care for his job or his students. He often uses Kawai as a scapegoat when something goes wrong, even when confronted by Yusuke of these ways he just smiled and accused Yuske of standing up for her because he was in love with Kawai. He always tries to find a way to get Kawai expelled, even giving a necklace he confiscated from Kawai to Hana in hopes that she would attack her to get it back. He showed his lowest point where he poured ink all over Kawai, and when he arrived in the room stated she ran away. Once she enters still drenched in ink, he goes off accusing the students as they had a grudge against her, even going as far as to accuse that Kawai did it herself to gain sympathy, where it wasn't till after all that did he admit it was him and he spilled it by "accident", though would only publicly state that if she announced she had reformed thanks to "her loving teacher's guidance".
Hana Ibuki
A sickly girl who arrives later in the manga because she has been hospitalized since before the start. She appears to be Kawai's opposite in every way as she is cheerful and popular. When she first returned to school, she noticed the necklace the teacher took from Kawai which he then gives her (seemingly as a way to get Kawai expelled in hopes she would attack Hana to get it back), however, she instead tries to befriend Kawai which goes well. Until she discovers that Yusuke confessed to Kawai, as she has feelings for Yusuke and even asked earlier if Kawai had feelings for him, which she denied but believes she is lying. Because of her outbursts, Kawai believes that she is only doing this because she likes the attention. This may be true as with anything that happens she is prone to emotional outbursts that get the rest of the classes attention in the matter, shown where Kawai causally pointed out that the cross was missing from the necklace, only for her to have an emotional outburst about it being missing. At the end of chapter 17 it appears that Hana is losing her sanity, smiling evilly with a blank look in her eyes. Later she conspires with the classmates against Kawai to have everyone hate her by setting her up with vicious comments about the other students in her bag, however this seems to quickly falls apart when Shin points out that she says what she feels without hesitation and wouldn't write that, as well as Kawai seeing through Hana's "help". However, later she sets Kawai up to make it look like she really did write it and ultimately suggests splitting up the group. In the end is stated to be the head of the group. This causes Kawai to show aggression for the first time, as she was truly dedicated to her role as the Choir Leader and correcting Hana when she thought that Kawai hated her, where she just didn't see her as a friend, calling her a Bad Friend. However, Hana finally shows her true colors and confirms that the teachers only set up Kawai as the Leader as a way to promote the school. Hana makes a conspiracy against Kawai to make herself look good at the choir competition. Hana finds out that reporters are going to be there. She gets even madder when Kawai ruins her plan 'accidentally' and bursts with anger in front of the camera. The reporters realize that Hana and everyone are misunderstanding Kawai.
Anna Mouri
A former close friend of Maria's from St. Katria Girls School. The two girls became friends when Anna heard Maria singing Amazing Grace they became very close because Maria, even at her old school found it hard to relate to others so she had no other friends. Anna was a very cheerful girl and got along well with the other girls until she lost her voice in an accident. Maria being friends with her said she would be her voice for her. Slowly Maria noticed the space growing between them and one day Maria saw Anna form the words "you corrupt others" which soon ended the friendship. She and Maria meets again soon after Shin starts to take piano lessons again.

== Manga ==
Completed with thirteen volumes published by Shueisha. Also licensed by Tong Li Publishing in Taiwan, Kana in France. Viz Media is releasing the series in print and digital formats.

| No. | Original release date | Original ISBN | English release date | English ISBN |
|---|---|---|---|---|
| 1 | 25 July 2007 | 9784088461939 | 7 February 2012 | 9781421541648 |
| 2 | 25 October 2007 | 9784088462219 | 3 April 2012 | 9781421541655 |
| 3 | 25 February 2008 | 9784088462639 | 5 June 2012 | 9781421541662 |
| 4 | 23 May 2008 | 9784088462943 | 7 August 2012 | 9781421541679 |
| 5 | 25 September 2008 | 9784088463339 | 2 October 2012 | 9781421541822 |
| 6 | 25 February 2009 | 9784088463827 | 4 December 2012 | 9781421541839 |
| 7 | 25 June 2009 | 9784088464176 | 5 February 2013 | 9781421541846 |
| 8 | 23 October 2009 | 9784088464527 | 2 April 2013 | 1421541858 |
| 9 | 25 February 2010 | 9784088464930 | 4 June 2013 | 1421541866 |
| 10 | 25 June 2010 | 9784088465340 | 6 August 2013 | 1421541874 |
| 11 | 25 October 2010 | 9784088465784 | 1 October 2013 | 1421551349 |
| 12 | 25 January 2011 | 9784088466118 | 3 December 2013 | 1421551357 |
| 13 | 25 May 2011 | 9784088466521 | 4 February 2014 | 1421551365 |

== See also ==
- 200m Saki no Netsu, another manga series by Miyoshi Tomori
