= Akazukin Chacha =

1994 television anime

- Cover of the first volume

赤ずきんチャチャ
- Genre: Comedy, magical girl
- Manga
- Written by: Min Ayahana
- Published by: Shueisha
- Magazine: Ribon
- Original run: 1992 – 2000
- Volumes: 13
- Anime television series
- Directed by: Hatsuki Tsuji
- Produced by: Noriko Kobayashi; Yoko Matsushita; Akio Wakana
- Music by: Toshihiko Sahashi; Osamu Tezuka
- Studio: Gallop
- Original network: TXN (TV Tokyo)
- English network: PH: Cartoon Network, ABS-CBN, Studio 23, Hero TV; SEA: Cartoon Network
- Original run: 7 January 1994 – 30 June 1995
- Episodes: 74
- Original video animation
- Directed by: Hatsuki Tsuji
- Produced by: Noriko Kobayashi; Yoko Matsushita; Akio Wakana
- Music by: Toshihiko Sahashi; Osamu Tezuka
- Studio: Gallop
- Released: 6 December 1995 – 6 March 1996
- Runtime: 30 minutes
- Episodes: 3
- Manga

Akazukin Chacha N
- Written by: Min Ayahana
- Published by: Shueisha
- Magazine: Cookie
- Original run: 26 June 2012 – 26 July 2019
- Volumes: 5

Akazukin Chacha (赤ずきんチャチャ, Akazukin Chacha; lit. 'Red Riding Hood Chacha') is a Japanese manga series written and illustrated by Min Ayahana. It was serialized in Shueisha's shōjo manga magazine Ribon from 1992 to 2000 and collected in 13 bound volumes. The series is loosely based on the fairy tale Little Red Riding Hood and follows the adventures of a fumbling student magician named Chacha, who habitually wears a red hooded cloak.

A 74-episode anime television series based on the manga was produced by NAS and TV Tokyo and animated by Gallop. It was first broadcast on TV Tokyo from 7 January 1994 to 30 June 1995. This was followed by a sequel original video animation (OVA) series of three episodes released between 6 December 1995 and 6 March 1996. In 1998, Cartoon Network aired an English dub of the Akazukin Chacha anime in Southeast Asia and Mandarin-speaking countries. In the anime, Chacha seeks the truth about her family and defend the kingdom against its enemies.

Two new one-shot manga titled Akazukin Chacha N were published in the May 2011 and January 2012 issues of Cookie. Akazukin Chacha N became a monthly series published from 2012 to 2019. This version of the story takes place in modern-day Tokyo.

== Story ==
Akazukin Chacha is the story of a young magical girl named Chacha. She lives in a cottage on Mochi-mochi Mountain with Seravy, her guardian and teacher, who is the world's greatest magician. Chacha is clumsy in casting her spells, frequently mistaking homonyms, such as summoning spiders (kumo (蜘蛛) in Japanese) instead of a cloud (also kumo (雲)). When she and her friends are in trouble, however, her spells do work. Living on the same mountain is a boy named Riiya, gifted with enormous strength, who comes from a family of werewolves. Far away from Mochi-mochi Mountain is Urizuri Mountain where Dorothy, a well known magician that has a past with Seravy, lives in a castle with her student, Shiine. Shiine is a young wizard, who is adept at casting spells and barriers, as well as transformations.

The storylines of the manga and the anime adaptation are markedly different: while the anime uses most of the same characters, the story of the first two seasons were invented for the television show. Most of the stories in the third season are based on the manga.

=== Story of the anime ===
At the beginning of the anime, when Chacha is about to begin school, Seravy gives her a pendant called the Princess Medallion, and a magical bracelet and ring to Riiya and Shiine respectively. The Princess Medallion enables Chacha to transform into the Magical Princess, who can defeat Daimaō's minions, when she shouts the phrase "Let Love, Courage and Hope -- Magical Princess Holy Up!" However, the transformation works only if the three of them get together.

In season one, Chacha, Shiine, and Riiya attend Urara School, named after their principal Urara. The three are in Banana Class with their teacher named Rascal-sensei who wields a whip and looks strict, but is actually very kind. In the same class is Kurozukin ("black-hooded") Yakko and Orin. Yakko admires Seravy deeply and even calls him Seravy-sama. Orin is a ninja of the Momonga Clan, and good at concealing herself. Orin is probably the most truthful character in the story, she develops a crush on Shiine when they first met. Later a selfish mermaid called Marin tags along because she is interested in Riiya.

In the second season, after Chacha's weapon, the Beauty Serene Arrow, was unable to beat one of Daimaō's minions, Access, the trio began to search for another, more powerful weapon called the Phoenix Sword or Wing Kris. As they do so, Chacha discovers that her parents are the King and Queen of their land. After encountering many obstacles, they find Phoenix Sword. They then begin their quest for the Bird Shield, the third weapon that the Magical Princess must acquire to defeat Daimaō's minions. At the end of this story arc, Chacha, Shiine, Riiya, Orin, Yakko, Marin, Dorothy, and Seravy together, as the eight Holy Warriors of Love, Courage, and Hope, get inside Daimaō's castle. They defeat Daimaō, after which the castle and the kingdom changes back to its original shape and color.

In season three, the King's Crest, which is a magical artifact called the Holy Bird, is stolen by one of Daimaō's minions, Soprano. Whoever possesses the King's Crest can make the world good or evil. When Chacha as the Magical Princess fights Soprano, by accident they break the seal, allowing demons to enter their world and start devastating their land. Seravy tells them that to close the seal again, they must use things that are from gods or goddesses. Because the Pendant, Bracelet, and Ring were given to them by Queen Joan, now a goddess, they sacrifice the three items to save the world. As a result, Chacha can no longer change into the Magical Princess, but her family gives her three more magical items, a magical brooch, compact, and Crescent Aurora Bracelet, which she can use to call up a boomerang which in turn brings her the items that can solve her problems. The rest of the series is based on the first 5 volumes of the manga. At the end of the series, Seravy settles down, engaged to be married to his former classmate, Dorothy.

== Characters ==
=== Main characters ===
All of the main characters appear in both the manga and anime versions.

- Chacha (チャチャ) – A young blonde girl with a red riding hood practicing magic under the care of her teacher, Seravy. She is often referred to as cute when she fumbles up her magic tricks, which is basically always. She is best friends with Riiya and Shiine. Voiced by: Masami Suzuki
- Riiya (リーヤ) – A young boy with great strength and an equally great appetite who has the ability to transform into a young white wolf at will, but is often mistaken for a dog. He is constantly fighting with Shiine over Chacha's affections and he dislikes Seravy on occasion. Voiced by: Shingo Katori (TV series/OVA), Yoshinobu Kaneko (Osawagase! Panic Race!)
- Shiine (しいね) – Left to Dorothy as a baby by Access (revealed to be his father), he was raised as a wizard and he also enjoys housework. With Chacha and Riiya's help, he is reunited with his parents. His magic powers are better than Chacha's and he is the most sensible and reasonable one in the group. He is very loyal to his Master Dorothy. Voiced by: Noriko Hidaka
- Seravy (セラヴィー) – Chacha's magic teacher, guardian, and the greatest wizard in the world. His first and only love was Dorothy, before she changed her curly blonde hair to straight black (red-pink in the anime) hair which Seravy detests. In the anime, he was formerly captain of the royal guards and escaped with Chacha when Daimaō attacked the castle. Voiced by: Toru Senrui
- Dorothy (どろしー) – Shiine's magic teacher who dreamed of becoming the greatest magician in the world. She defeated Piikapon, thus earning the title of greatest magician for only a few minutes because Seravy accidentally hit Dorothy over the head with a huge bouquet of flowers he conjured (to congratulate her), thus earning him the title of greatest magician of the world. Dorothy angrily turned her curly blond hair red-pink and straight as retaliation because Seravy wouldn't fight with his "beloved Dorothy". Voiced by: Junko Otsubo, later Miina Tominaga
- Elizabeth (エリザベス) – Seravy's favorite doll, which he voices with ventriloquism. She is the image of Dorothy when she was younger. Seravy often talks to Elizabeth and Elizabeth often is the one who pokes fun at Dorothy, often in reference to her hair, temper and habit of making Shiine do housework for her. Voiced by: Junko Otsubo, later Miina Tominaga
- Yakko (やっこ) – A black-hooded girl in Chacha's class who is in love with Seravy. She specializes in potions and dislikes Chacha as well because she wishes to be Seravy's only student, in the hopes of him falling in love with her. Yakko is closest with Orin but is often seen with Marin. Voiced by: Mayumi Akado
- Marin (マリン) – A selfish mermaid who can change into a human when her tail dries out. She is in love with Riiya, but she is totally oblivious to the fact that he's a werewolf. She dislikes Chacha and on occasion hangs out with Yakko and Orin. She constantly appears with the Banana students with Riiya, despite being in the Apple class under Teacher Barabaraman. Voiced by: Tomo Sakurai
- Orin (お鈴) – Known in the English dub as "Suzu". She is a small but nimble ninja and excellent swords-girl. She is often the voice of reason of Yakko and on occasion hangs out with Marin, too. She has a crush on Shiine, and turns pink whenever he speaks to her. She is the most truthful with regards to character and shows no hatred towards anyone. Voiced by: Noriko Namiki
- Principal Urara (ウララ) – Principal of Urara School. She wears a pink dress and her eyes are very big. She is also quite absent-minded at times. Voiced by: Sumi Shimamoto
- Teacher Rascal (ラスカル) – Teacher of Banana class. He has long hair which he ties with a yellow bow on some episodes. He loves to whip his students into shape but has a soft side. Voiced by: Taiki Matsuno
- Riiya's Grandfather (リーヤのじいちゃん) – A werewolf giant who raised Riiya and his brothers. In the anime, he served for the King and helped Seravy escape the castle with Chacha during the takeover of Daimaō. Voiced by: Seiji Mizutani
- Teacher Oyuki (おゆき) – A substitute teacher who can make snow appear due to being a yuki-onna. Voiced by: Miina Tominaga
- Teacher Barabaraman (バラバラマン) – Teacher of the Apple class. He can grow roses on his hair when he is excited and has thorns growing all over his body. Chacha and Teacher Barabaraman won a three legged race using a combination of Seravy's potion and Chacha's Assistance Boomarang. Voiced by: Tsutomu Kashiwakura
- Teacher Mayachon (まやちょん) – Teacher of Orange class. She was classmates and rivals with Rascal when they were younger. She actually likes Mr. Rascal very much and hates it that he's nice to everyone but her. Voiced by: Chieko Honda
- Access (アクセス) – Shiine's father. In the anime, he works for Daimaō at the beginning (due to the fact that Daimaō imprisoned his wife) but is defeated by the Phoenix Sword. He is charged with finding the King's Crest. Later in the series, he is reunited with Shiine and Shiine's mother and lives in the castle with them. Voiced by: Hiroshi Takahashi
- Doris (ドリス) – Dorothy's younger brother, but he usually dressed as a woman and is in love with Seravy. He is jealous of Dorothy for being the love of Seravy. Voiced by: Kazue Komiya
- Dr. Mikeneko (ミケネコ博士) – Mad scientist, creator of Nyandaber. Resembles a cat, so his inventions resemble that of a cat, as well, namely Nyandaber. Voiced by: Hiroshi Takahashi
- Piikapon (ピカポン) – A bald wizard constantly mocked and wants to beat Seravy in a magical duel ever since Seravy beat him. Chacha, Riiya, and Shiine-chan call him "Tono" because of the hairstyle Seravy gave him. Voiced by: Toshio Furukawa
- Poppy (ポピィ) – A telepathic spy originally sent by Momiji School to find out why Urara School's students are constantly becoming famous. He later joins Chacha, Riiya, and Shiine in the core group of characters. Voiced by: Rika Matsumoto
- Principal Momiji (もみじ園長) – Principal of Momiji School. Voiced by: Yō Inoue

=== Manga-only characters ===
- Yajirobe (やじろべー) – Yakko's grandfather. His rescue by Seravy years ago serves as the main reason for Yakko's crush on the latter.
- Katan (カータン) – King of karuta.
- Sanae (サナエ) – Riiya's elder brother.
- Dolphinga (ドルフィンガー)
- Yanta (やん太) – Yakko's younger brother.
- Rinnosuke (鈴之介) – Orin's younger brother.
- Nami (ナミ) – Marin's younger sister.
- Chuchu (チュチュ) – Chacha's younger sister.
- Ichimatsu (市松) – A robot who was sent to kill Popi, but later becomes his ally.
- Lizard (リザード) – Seravy's adopted father, who mostly appears as a beautiful green-haired woman but is in truth a 250-year-old bipedal lizard.
- Hohoemi Senshi Egaon (ほほえみ戦士エガオン)
- Heihachi (平八) – A young demon from the Demon World who was sent to conquer the Magic Kingdom, but prefers to collect video games instead. He is later revealed to be the youngest son of Daimaō and youngest brother of Seravy.
- Naruto (なると) – Popy's younger brother.
- Daimaō (大魔王) – Unlike the Daimaō from the anime series, the manga's Daimaō is an agreeable magician with the appearance of a rock-and-roll singer and is a great manga fan. He is the father of Heihachi and is later revealed to be the birth father of Seravy. In the concluding chapters of the manga, he takes the roles of escorting Riiya to a great mountain and help to retrieve a rare crystal so that Riiya can apologize and propose marriage at the same time to Chacha.
- Amedeo (アメデオ) – Son of Rascal and Mayachon, best friend of Naruto.
- Yuurin and Riiran (ユーリン+リーラン) – Seravi and Dorothy's twins.

=== Anime-only characters ===
- Magical Princess (マジカルプリンセス) – The adult magical girl alter-ego of Chacha. Voiced by: Masami Suzuki
- Daimaō (大魔王) – Daimaō in the anime is not the same character as Daimaō in the manga. As the story's main antagonist, Daimaō is a demon who wishes to conquer the land and devastate it. A long time ago, Daimaō turned the King and Queen to stone statues. The father of the King, Grand King Genius, sacrificed himself to trap Daimaō inside the castle using a barrier of crystals that formed a spirit shield. As a result, Daimaō has to send his minions to do his nasty works for him. He is finally destroyed when eight of the main protagonists (Chacha, Riiya, Shiine, Seravy, Dorothy, Marin, Yakko, Orin) combined their powers on him. Voiced by: Tetsuo Komura
- Sorges (ソーゲス) – Daimaō's head henchman, later becomes friends with Chacha and the gang. Voiced by: Yūji Mitsuya
- Yordas (ヨーダス) – One of Sorges' henchmen. Voiced by: Yūji Mitsuya
- Haideyans (ハイデヤンス) – One of Sorges' henchmen. Voiced by: Yūji Mitsuya
- Shironeko (シロネコ) – Dr. Mikeneko's sister. She once tried to switch Chacha's Princess Medallion with a fake, but end up falling in love with Seravy in the process. Torn between her duty and her love, she eventually found peace when she and her brothers learned that they did not have to fight anymore. Voiced by: Sumi Shimamoto
- Piisuke (ピー助) – The phoenix chick Chacha protected from Yordas. Piisuke becomes the Phoenix Sword, but reverts to being a chick when the three magic items are sacrificed. He is later often seen with Principal Urara. Voiced by: Sumi Shimamoto
- Grand King Genius (ジーニアス) – Chacha's grandfather and Seravy's teacher. Voiced by: Keaton Yamada

== Media ==
=== Manga ===
Akazukin Chacha was written and illustrated by Min Ayahana. It was serialized in 94 chapters by Shueisha in the manga magazine Ribon from 1992 and 2000 and collected in 13 tankōbon volumes. The series was reissued in 2006 in a nine-volume "library edition" with new covers. The manga was licensed for publishing in Taiwan by Da Ran Culture.

A sequel series, titled "Akazukin Chacha N" (赤ずきんチャチャN), set in modern-day Japan, was first published in two one-shots in Cookie on 26 March – 26 November 2011. A serialized version of the sequel started in the same magazine on 26 June 2012. The series finished on 26 July 2019. Shueisha compiled its individual chapters into five tankōbon volumes, published from 25 November 2013 to 25 September 2019.

No.	Release date	ISBN
1	February 1993	4-08-853650-9
2	October 1993	4-08-853694-0
3	May 1994	4-08-853732-7
4	October 1994	4-08-853759-9
5	March 1995	4-08-853786-6
6	August 1995	4-08-853810-2
7	March 1996	4-08-853846-3
8	January 1997	4-08-853897-8
9	January 1998	4-08-856059-0
10	December 1998	4-08-856115-5
11	November 1999	4-08-856174-0
12	May 2000	4-08-856205-4
13	September 2000	4-08-856226-7

=== Anime ===
The series was adapted as an anime television series produced by TV Tokyo and Nihon Ad Systems and animated by Gallop. The series was direct by Shoki Tsuji with music by Osamu Tezuka and Toshihiko Sahashi and character designs by Hajime Watanabe. The opening theme was "Kimi-iro Omoi" (君色思い), performed by SMAP during the original broadcast and Shoko Sawada on the DVD release. There were three ending themes: "Egao ga Sukidakara" (笑顔が好きだから) by Shoko Sawada for episodes 1–31, "Chacha ni Omakase " (チャチャにおまかせ) by Masami Suzuki, Tomo Sakurai, and Mayumi Akado for episodes 32–56, and "Welcome to the Magical School" (ようこそマジカル·スクールへ, Youkoso Majikaru Sukūru e) by Masami Suzuki and Magical Study for episodes 57–74.

Due to the popularity of Sailor Moon at the time, which popularized the "transforming heroines who fight" concept in magical girl anime, the first two seasons of Akazukin Chacha featured an original plotline using a similar concept in order to compete.

The series was first broadcast on TV Tokyo in 74 episodes from 7 January 1994 to 30 June 1995. In 1998, Cartoon Network aired an English dub of the Akazukin Chacha anime in Southeast Asia and Mandarin-speaking countries. Additionally, the series has aired in Hong Kong (ATV network), Philippines (IBC in 1996, ABS-CBN in 1999, Cartoon Network and Hero TV). The series was also aired in Indonesian-dubbed by RCTI, from 2002 to 2004, and Spacetoon between 2006–present.

=== Original video animation ===
The television series was followed by a three-episode sequel original video animation (OVA) series, also animated by Gallop. These were released between 6 December 1995 and 6 March 1996. The opening theme for all three episodes was "Make Me Smile" by Yuki Matsuura and the ending theme was "Negai wa Hitotsu" (願いはひとつ) also by Yuki Matsuura.

The OVA series depicts the efforts of the elite Momiji School as they try to find out why the greatest witches and wizards in the world come from Urara School. A psionic named Popy-kun is sent to infiltrate the school, but things will not prove too easy when Chacha and friends try to befriend Popy-kun instead.

=== Games ===
Akazukin Chacha was adapted as a series of video games:

- Akazukin Chacha (Game Boy, Tomy, 1995)
- Akazukin Chacha (Super Famicom, Tomy, 1996)
- Akazukin Chacha: Osawagase! Panic Race! (PC-FX, NEC Home Electronics, 1996)

== In popular culture ==
In the novel Death Note Another Note: The Los Angeles BB Murder Cases, Akazukin Chacha is mentioned several times. Rue Ryuzaki mentions that he loves Akazukin Chacha (Shiine in particular) and notices that volumes four and nine are missing from a collection, which is a vital clue to the case.

In the manga City of Dead Sorcerer detective Kim calls the elusive murderer Crimson Robe several times Chacha, while stating that he's a fan of Akazukin Chacha.

Preceded by Hime-chan's Ribbon (October 2nd 1992 – December 3rd 1993)	TV Tokyo Friday 18:00 Timeframe Akazukin Chacha (January 7th 1994 – June 30th, 1995)	Succeeded by Nurse Angel Ririka SOS (July 7th, 1995 – March 8th, 1996)
