= Tokimeki Tonight =

Japanese manga series

- Cover of the 25th tankōbon volume

ときめきトゥナイト (Tokimeki Tunaito)
- Genre: Romantic comedy, supernatural
- Manga
- Written by: Koi Ikeno
- Published by: Shueisha
- Imprint: Ribon Mascot Comics
- Magazine: Ribon
- Original run: July 1982 – October 1994
- Volumes: 30
- Anime television series
- Directed by: Hiroshi Sasagawa (chief)
- Music by: Kazuo Otani
- Studio: Group TAC
- Original network: NTV
- Original run: October 7, 1982 – September 22, 1983
- Episodes: 34
- Manga

Tokimeki Midnight
- Written by: Koi Ikeno
- Published by: Shueisha
- Magazine: Cookie
- Original run: 2002 – 2009
- Volumes: 9
- Manga

Tokimeki Tonight: Sore kara
- Written by: Koi Ikeno
- Published by: Shueisha
- Magazine: Cookie
- Original run: May 26, 2021 – present
- Volumes: 6

Tokimeki Tonight (Japanese: ときめきトゥナイト, Hepburn: Tokimeki Tunaito; lit. 'Exciting Tonight') is a Japanese manga series written and illustrated by Koi Ikeno. It was serialized in Shueisha's manga magazine Ribon from July 1982 to October 1994 and became a huge commercial success. The manga series had a circulation of 30 million copies in total, making it one of the best-selling manga series. An anime television series produced by Toho and Group TAC was broadcast on Nippon Television from October 7, 1982, to September 22, 1983.

== Plot ==
12-year-old Ranze Eto lives in an isolated castle in Japan with her werewolf mother, vampire father, and younger brother, Rinze. Despite her lineage, she has yet to demonstrate any special powers of her own, and her parents are worried she might be a normal girl. One day, Ranze's innate power finally manifests itself when she, quite by accident, discovers that she can change herself into a carbon copy of any object she bites, whether it be a person or an inanimate object like a piece of bread, and can return to her normal self only by sneezing. Her parents are overjoyed, but Ranze's new powers make it difficult to continue living life as a normal teenage girl.

On Ranze's first day at her new school in junior high, she meets and falls in love with the brash yet handsome young athlete, Shun Makabe. The chief problem with this is that Ranze's parents will not allow her to date a human - although there may be much more to Shun than meets the eye. On top of this, she also has a bitter rival in the pretty but spiteful Yoko Kamiya (the daughter of a yakuza boss) who also likes Shun and doesn't take kindly to Ranze's intruding on her turf.

== Characters ==
=== Eto Family ===
Ranze Eto (江藤 蘭世, Etō Ranze)
Voiced by: Eriko Hara
The lead character, a 12-year-old girl. Ranze originally manifests no supernatural powers until she bites Yoko Kamiya and discovers she has vampiric powers that let her "metamorph" into whatever she bites a certain way.
Rinze Eto (江藤 鈴世, Etō Rinze)
Voiced by: Sanae Miyuki
Ranze's 7-year-old younger brother. He appears to not have any supernatural powers but seems to be the only one that can tell who Ranze is when she is transformed.
Mori Eto (江藤 望里, Etō Mori)
Voiced by: Yoshito Yasuhara
Ranze's father, a vampire.
Shiira Eto (江藤 椎羅, Etō Shīra)
Voiced by: Noriko Ohara
Ranze's mother, a werewolf. She forbids Ranze from liking human boys.
Peck (ペック, Pekku)
Voiced by: Takashi Taguchi
A talking parrot born in the Spirit World. The Eto Family's pet.

=== Makabe Family ===
Shun Makabe (真壁 俊, Makabe Shun)
Voiced by: Yū Mizushima
The boy Ranze and Yoko fight over. He is training to be a professional boxer.
Hanae Makabe (真壁 華枝, Makabe Hanae)
Voiced by: Yuri Nashiwa
Shun's mother.

=== Kamiya Family ===
Yoko Kamiya (神谷 曜子, Kamiya Yōko)
Voiced by: Miina Tominaga
Ranze's romantic rival, the spoiled daughter of a yakuza boss.
Tamasaburo Kamiya (神谷 玉三郎, Kamiya Tamasaburō)
Voiced by: Junpei Takiguchi
Yoko's father. An enormous, bulky man who develops a crush on Shun's mother.

=== Others ===
Kunihiko "Shuusai" Takaba (國彦「酒斎」高場, Takaba "Shūsai" Kunihiko)
Voiced by: Yoku Shioya
A bookworm who has a crush on Ranze.
Aron (アロン = ルーク = ウォーレンサー, Aron Rūku Wōrensā)
Voiced by: Hirotaka Suzuoki
Prince of Demon World. He is in love with Ranze.
Sand (羅々, Rara)
Voiced by: Hideyuki Tanaka
The infamous "womanizer" who typically accompanies Aron.
Mr. Mitsuki (みつきさん, Mitsuki-san)
Ranze's homeroom teacher.

== Media ==
=== Manga ===
There are 30 volumes in the original release of the manga series in Japan. By 2006, they sold 26 million copies, making Tokimeki Tonight the sixth best-selling shōjo manga.

No.	Japanese release date	Japanese ISBN
1	November 15, 1982	4-08-853247-3
2	March 15, 1983	4-08-853257-0
3	August 12, 1983	4-08-853271-6
4	December 12, 1983	4-08-853281-3
5	April 13, 1984	4-08-853292-9
6	August 15, 1984	4-08-853304-6
7	November 15, 1984	4-08-853313-5
8	March 15, 1985	4-08-853325-9
9	July 15, 1985	4-08-853337-2
10	December 10, 1985	4-08-853352-6
11	April 15, 1986	4-08-853364-X
12	August 12, 1986	4-08-853376-3
13	December 10, 1986	4-08-853388-7
14	April 15, 1987	4-08-853400-X
15	July 15, 1987	4-08-853410-7
16	March 15, 1988	4-08-853436-0
17	August 12, 1988	4-08-853453-0
18	February 15, 1989	4-08-853474-3
19	July 14, 1989	4-08-853489-1
20	December 8, 1989	4-08-853506-5
21	May 15, 1990	4-08-853523-5
22	October 15, 1990	4-08-853540-5
23	February 14, 1992	4-08-853598-7
24	July 15, 1992	4-08-853618-5
25	October 15, 1992	4-08-853632-0
26	March 15, 1993	4-08-853654-1
27	September 14, 1993	4-08-853686-X
28	March 15, 1994	4-08-853720-3
29	August 10, 1994	4-08-853747-5
30	January 13, 1995	4-08-853775-0

==== Tokimeki Midnight ====
In 2002, a second manga series called Tokimeki Midnight (ときめきミッドナイト) lit. 'Exciting Midnight', also by Koi Ikeno, began serialization in Shueisha's magazine Cookie. The manga is an alternate retelling where the roles are reversed. The series was completed in 2009 with nine volumes.

No.	Japanese release date	Japanese ISBN
1	December 11, 2002	4-08-856429-4
2	September 12, 2003	4-08-856494-4
3	April 15, 2004	4-08-856533-9
4	May 13, 2005	4-08-856615-7
5	October 14, 2005	4-08-856647-5
6	September 15, 2006	4-08-856708-0
7	October 15, 2007	978-4-08-856782-2
8	July 15, 2008	978-4-08-856831-7
9	August 12, 2009	978-4-08-867009-6

==== Tokimeki Tonight: Sore kara ====
On May 26, 2021, a sequel, Tokimeki Tonight: Sore kara (ときめきトゥナイト それから; lit. Exciting Tonight: From Then), which takes place after the third arc where Ranze and Makabe's daughter Aira saves the world from crisis and centers on the lead protagonist Ranze as her 40s, began serialization in Cookie magazine starting from July 2021 issue.

No.	Japanese release date	Japanese ISBN
1	March 25, 2022	978-4-08-867669-2
2	January 25, 2023	978-4-08-867715-6
3	November 24, 2023	978-4-08-867743-9
4	September 4, 2024	978-4-08-867775-0
5	July 25, 2025	978-4-08-867812-2
6	May 25, 2026	978-4-08-867842-9

=== Other books ===
There are several additional stories set in the Tokimeki Tonight universe that have been collected in the following volumes:

- Tokimeki Tonight: Hoshi no Yukue (ときめきトゥナイト―星のゆくえ―) (2000, 1 volume, Ribon Mascot Comics, Shueisha, ISBN 4-08-856201-1). Contains:
  - Tokimeki Tonight: Hoshi no Yukue
  - Hoshi no Yukue (Kamiya-ke Hen) (星のゆくえ（神谷家編）)
  - Hoshi no Yukue (Etō-ke Hen) (星のゆくえ（江藤家編）)
  - Hoshi no Yukue (Ichihashi-ke Hen) (星のゆくえ（市橋家編）)
  - Hoshi no Yukue (Aoyagi-ke Hen) (星のゆくえ（青柳家編）)
- Tokimeki Tonight: Makabe Shun no Jijō (ときめきトゥナイト 真壁俊の事情) (August 2013, Ribon Mascot Comics, Shueisha, ISBN 978-4-08-867290-8)
- Tokimeki Tonight: Etō Mōri no Kakeochi (ときめきトゥナイト 江藤望里の駆け落ち) (April 2015, Ribon Mascot Comics, Shueisha, ISBN 978-4-08-867370-7)
- Tokimeki Tonight: Etō Ranze no Takarabako (ときめきトゥナイト 江藤蘭世の宝箱) (July 2019, Ribon Mascot Comics, Shueisha, ISBN 978-4-08-867557-2)

Additional books released about the series include:

- Tokimeki Manga Road: Ikeno Koi 40th Anniversary Book (ときめきまんが道 池野恋40周年本, Tokimeki Manga Michi: Ikeno Koi 40 Shūnen Hon) (July 2019, 2 volumes, Shueisha)
  - Volume 1 (ISBN 978-4-08-792052-9)
  - Volume 2 (ISBN 978-4-08-792053-6)

=== Anime ===
A 34-episode anime television series adaptation, directed by Hiroshi Sasagawa and produced by Group TAC and Toho, aired in Japan between October 7, 1982, and September 22, 1983, on Nippon TV. Its opening theme is "Tokimeki Tonight" and its ending theme is "Super Love Lotion". Since Group TAC closed its doors as a studio, Toho has been the sole rights-holder of the series.

Since the anime series ended years before the manga, the staff had to craft their own conclusion. In the final episode it's revealed Shun has a star-shaped birthmark that proves he is the long lost prince of the Demon World. However, Shun denies this, saying it's actually a bruise and not a birthmark. The door to the Demon World is sealed, with the Eto family banished until they are able to locate the lost prince. Sometime later, Shun's mother reveals the star-shaped mark is in fact a birthmark. The following morning Shun tries to tell Ranze the truth but is interrupted by Yoko. The series closes with a special version of "Super Love Lotion" featuring the main cast.

==== Episode list ====
No.	Title	Original release date
1	"Secret of étranger" Transliteration: "Etoranze no Himitsu" (Japanese: エトランゼの秘密)	October 7, 1982
2	"Door to The Demon World"; Transliteration: "Makai e no Tobira" (Japanese: 魔界への扉)	October 14, 1982
3	"Bathroom Crisis"; Transliteration: "Basurūmu no Kiki" (Japanese: バスルームの危機)	October 21, 1982
4	"A Small Friendship"; Transliteration: "Chiisana Yūjō" (Japanese: 小さな友情)	October 28, 1982
5	"Ranze goes to the Demon World"; Transliteration: "Ranze Makai e Iku" (Japanese: ランゼ魔界へ行く)	November 4, 1982
6	"Romance in the Foggy Night"; Transliteration: "Kiri no Yoru no Romansu" (Japanese: 霧の夜のロマンス)	November 11, 1982
7	"The Terrifying Culture Festival"; Transliteration: "Kyōfu no Bunka-sai" (Japanese: 恐怖の文化祭)	November 18, 1982
8	"Action Camera of Love"; Transliteration: "Koi no Akushon Kamera" (Japanese: 恋のアクションカメラ)	November 25, 1982
9	"Tamasaburo's Love"; Transliteration: "Tamasaburō no Koi" (Japanese: 玉三郎の恋)	December 2, 1982
10	"The Invisible Girl, Miel"; Transliteration: "Tōmei Shōjo Miēru" (Japanese: 透明少女ミエール)	December 9, 1982
11	"Full Moon Birthday"; Transliteration: "Mangetsu no Tanjōbi" (Japanese: 満月の誕生日)	December 16, 1982
12	"Teehee. Ranze's Wish"; Transliteration: "Ufu!? Ranze no Onegai" (Japanese: うふ!? ランゼのお願い)	December 23, 1982
13	"White Sweethearts"; Transliteration: "Shiroi Koibito-tachi" (Japanese: 白い恋人達)	January 6, 1983
14	"I saw her! Ranze is a Tanuki!"; Transliteration: "Mita!! Ranze wa Tanuki" (Japanese: 見た!! ランゼはたぬき)	January 13, 1983
15	"Sorry I'm naked" Transliteration: "Hadaka de Gomen'nasai" (Japanese: 裸でごめんなさい)	January 20, 1983
16	"The Youthful Runner of Love"; Transliteration: "Koi no Seishun Rannā" (Japanese: 恋の青春ランナー)	January 27, 1983
17	"The Flirtatious Magician"; Transliteration: "Uwaki na Majutsushi" (Japanese: 浮気な魔術師)	February 3, 1983
18	"Title Match of Love"; Transliteration: "Koi no Taitoru Matchi" (Japanese: 恋のタイトルマッチ)	February 10, 1983
19	"The Great Sentimental Giant"; Transliteration: "Senchimentaru Dai Kyojin" (Japanese: センチメンタル大巨人)	February 17, 1983
20	"Chaos! Lots of Ranzes!"; Transliteration: "Daikonran! Ranze ga Ippai" (Japanese: 大混乱! ランゼがいっぱい)	February 24, 1983
21	"Love Letter from E.T."; Transliteration: "E.T. kara no Rabu Retā" (Japanese: E.T.からのラブレター)	March 3, 1983
22	"Panic! Pajama Game"; Transliteration: "Dokidoki! Pajama Gēmu" (Japanese: ドキドキ! パジャマゲーム)	March 10, 1983
23	"Sand's Love Story"; Transliteration: "Sando no Koi no Monogatari" (Japanese: サンドの恋の物語)	March 17, 1983
24	"Ardent Love! Great War in the Demon World"; Transliteration: "Netsuai! Makai Taisen" (Japanese: 熱愛! 魔界大戦)	March 24, 1983
25	"Transformation Revealed: Kill Shun"; Transliteration: "Mirareta Henshin! Shun o Koroshite" (Japanese: 見られた変身! 俊を殺して)	March 31, 1983
26	"Execution Fleet! Space Wars"; Transliteration: "Shokei Senkan! Supēsu Wōzu" (Japanese: 処刑戦艦! スペースウォーズ)	April 28, 1983
27	"Clash! Rocky VS Shun"; Transliteration: "Gekitotsu: Rokkī VS Shun" (Japanese: 激突・ロッキーVS俊)	May 5, 1983
28	"Delinquent Angel: Love Hunter"; Transliteration: "Tsuppari Enjeru Koi no Hantā" (Japanese: つっぱりエンジェル恋のハンター)	May 19, 1983
29	"Shock! A Future Encounter"; Transliteration: "Shokku! Mirai to no Sōgū" (Japanese: ショック! 未来との遭遇)	June 9, 1983
30	"The Prince's Order of Assassination"; Transliteration: "Ōji kara no Ansatsu Shirei" (Japanese: 王子からの暗殺指令)	June 16, 1983
31	"The Migratory Bird Returns"; Transliteration: "Kaettekita Wataridori" (Japanese: 帰ってきた渡り鳥)	June 23, 1983
32	"Venture! Island of Sweethearts"; Transliteration: "Bōken! Koibito-tachi no Shima" (Japanese: 冒険! 恋人たちの島)	July 7, 1983
33	"Tokimeki Folktales"; Transliteration: "Manga Tokimeki Mukashibanashi" (Japanese: マンガときめき昔話)	July 28, 1983
34	"Fall in Love! Be in Love! The Love Triangle!"; Transliteration: "Koishite! Aishite! Sankaku Kankei" (Japanese: 恋して! 愛して! 三角関係)	September 22, 1983

== Reception ==
The manga had a circulation of 30 million copies in 2021.

On Anime News Network, Justin Sevakis said the anime was "a thirty year-old comedy that's still funny, with a setup that's still plausible and interesting, and animation that's still serviceable".
