= Honey Bitter =

Japanese manga series by Miho Obana

- Cover of the first manga volume
- Genre: Mystery, romance, suspense
- Manga
- Written by: Miho Obana
- Published by: Shueisha
- English publisher: Shueisha (digital)
- Magazine: Cookie
- Original run: February 2004 – December 2018
- Volumes: 14

Honey Bitter is Japanese josei manga by Miho Obana, serialized in Shueisha's Cookie from February 2004 to December 1, 2018. In honor of the twentieth anniversary of Miho Obana's debut, a crossover between Honey Bitter and Kodocha called Deep Clear was released in 2010. Shueisha began publishing the manga in English on its Manga Million digital platform in 2026.

== Plot ==
Honey Bitter revolves around a girl named Shuri who was mistreated by her ex-boyfriend, Riki. She grew a hate for men in general after she had broken up with him, and wanted to start over fresh with her life. She started to work for aunt's company, using her ability to see things before they happened as a stepping stone to becoming a great detective. However, by mistake, her aunt hires her ex for the company as well, and Shuri's life takes a turn for the worse as she must put up with him now.

== Characters ==
Shuri Otokawa (音川 珠里, Otokawa Shuri)
Shuri has ESP, and a tendency to act very cold towards men due to her experiences with her ex, Riki. She works at "Office S", her Aunt Saho's detective agency. In Deep Clear, she is hired by Rei to figure out why Akito had separated from Sana, which she learns is because he is afraid that she will die giving birth. She becomes friends with Sana and is at the hospital when Sana gives birth. She even convinces Akito to confront his fears by going to the hospital and see the birth go well. Sana is so thankful that she names her newborn daughter after Shuri.
Riki Nijihara (虹原 吏己, Nijihara Riki)
A brilliant yet almost silent detective. When he met Shuri in high school, he abused her, was rough with her on bed when taking her virginity and also hit her repeatedly. Now that he's joined the "Office S" staff, he acts as if nothing happened between him and Shuri, and at points even seems to show romantic interests in her. He tries to apologize to her but Shuri says that it's impossible. He carries with him a gun and he's a very good shot, once saving his Yohta's life from a criminal.
Yohta Kubo (久保 陽太, Kubo Yohta)
The boy Shuri met when she was in New York City at a shooting range. He rented one of Saho's apartments. When he could not pay the rent, he confronted Saho, who offered to let him pay his rent later in return for his services as a bodyguard. He has a past in kickboxing, as well as a crush the size of Texas on Shuri. Throughout the series, he makes many advances on Shuri, but stops whenever she shows any sign of discomfort.
Saho Kohno (香野 早穂, Kōno Saho)
Shuri's maternal aunt, the head of the "Office S" detective agency. As a former detective, she has an unusually large network of contacts, including a former prime minister of Japan.

== Volumes ==
No.	Japan release date	Japan ISBN
1	June 15, 2004	4-08-856548-7
2	February 15, 2005	4-08-856592-4
3	October 14, 2005	4-08-856646-7
4	June 15, 2007	978-4-08-856753-2
5	February 13, 2009	978-4-08-856872-0
6	April 15, 2010	978-4-08-867052-2
7	November 15, 2011	978-4-08-867159-8
8	April 15, 2013	978-4-08-867266-3
9	December 13, 2013	978-4-08-867302-8
10	August 12, 2014	978-4-08-867335-6
11	April 24, 2015	978-4-08-867369-1
12	August 25, 2016	978-4-08-867428-5
13	August 25, 2017	978-4-08-867472-8
14	February 25, 2019	978-4-08-867540-4

== Reception ==
Volume 6 reached the 22nd place on the weekly Oricon manga charts with 29,422 copies sold; volume 7 reached the 16th place, with 38,895 copies sold; volume 8 reached the 20th place with 40,906 copies; volume 9 reached the 43rd place and has sold 48,195 copies as of December 22, 2013; volume 10 reached the 22nd place with 36,644 copies and volume 11 reached the 36th place and has sold 47,642 copies as of May 3, 2015.
