= Miho Obana =

Japanese manga artist

Miho Obana 小花 美穂
- Born: April 26, 1970 (age 56) Tokyo, Japan
- Area: Manga artist
- Notable works: Kodomo no Omocha, Honey Bitter
- Awards: Kodansha Manga Award for shōjo in 1998

Miho Obana (小花 美穂, Obana Miho; born April 26, 1970) is a shōjo manga artist born in Tokyo, Japan. Her best-known work was Kodomo no Omocha, also known as Kodocha, which was published in Ribon magazine, and won the Kodansha Manga Award for shōjo in 1998. Other works include Partner, Andante and Honey Bitter.

== Biography ==
Obana began her manga career as an assistant to Momoko Sakura, the creator of Chibi Maruko-chan. In 1990 she debuted with a one-shot manga, Mado no Mukō, which was published in the autumn 1990 issue of Ribon Bikkuri. Later stories would appear in Ribon Original and Ribon magazines.

In 1994, she authored Kodomo no Omocha, a shojo manga series about a child actress who interacts with an aloof elementary school boy. The series won the Kodansha Manga Award for shojo in 1998, and was adapted to an anime television series Kodocha that ran for 102 episodes. Within the TV series, there is a character named after her. The manga ran until 1998, totaling 10 tankōbon volumes. In 1999, she wrote a one-shot called Mizu no Yakata which focuses on the drama story that characters Sana and Naozumi of Kodomo no Omocha starred in. In 2015, Kodocha was adapted into a stage play. She also released a Kodocha one-shot for the 60th anniversary of Ribon.

In 1999, she authored Partner, a drama series about two pairs of twins who are classmates and friends when one of them is killed by a drunk driver. Partner was noted for its dark, mature, and disturbing tone, and ran through 2000 in Ribon, and compiled into 3 tankōbon volumes. In 2001, she worked on Andante, a story about a girl who falls in love with her stepbrother but a family friend whose parents have died comes to live with them. It was serialized in Ribon through 2002, and compiled into 3 tankōbon volumes. In 2003, she worked on Pochi, which is about a junior high school girl who is stressed about life and her classmate whose mother treats him as a pet dog.

In 2004, Obana started a josei manga called Honey Bitter, about a girl who was mistreated by her ex-boyfriend but then has to deal with him as a coworker in their aunt's detective agency. The manga was serialized in Cookie from February 2004 to December 2018, and occasionally appeared in the Oricon charts for top manga. She also wrote some manga for the josei magazine Chorus. In November 2008, Obana took a hiatus from making manga because of her pregnancy and worsening tendonitis; she resumed working on Honey Bitter in November 2009. In 2010, celebrating her 20th anniversary of her debut, she authored Deep Clear, a two-part crossover story with characters from Kodomo no Omocha and Honey Bitter.

== Works ==
Title	Year	Notes	Refs
Shiranami no Gensō (白波の幻想, Shiranami no Illusion)	1992	Serialized in Ribon; Published in 1 volume.	
Setsunai ne (せつないね)	1993	Published in Ribon; Published in 1 volume.	
Kono te wo Hanasanai (この手をはなさない, I won't let go of this hand)	1994	Serialized in Ribon; Published in 2 volumes.	
Kodomo no Omocha	1994–98	Serialized in Ribon; Published by Shueisha in 10 volumes. Kodansha Manga Award, Shojo, 1998	
Mizu no yakata (水の館, Mansion of Water)	1999	Serialized in Ribon; Published in 1 volume.	
Neko no Shima (猫の島, The Island of Cats)	1996	Serialized in Ribon; Published in 1 volume.	
Partner	1999–2000	Serialized in Ribon; Published by Shueisha in 3 volumes.	
Andante	2001–02	Serialized in Ribon; Published by Shueisha in 3 volumes.	
Pochi	2003	Serialized in Ribon; Published by Shueisha in 1 volume.	
Aruyōde Nai Otoko (あるようでない男)	2003	Published in Queen's Comics; Published by Shueisha in 1 volume.	
Honey Bitter	2004–2018	Serialized in Cookie; Published by Shueisha in 14 volumes.	
Deep Clear	2010	Serialized in Cookie; Crossover story with Kodomo no Omocha and Honey Bitter to celebrate 20th anniversary of Obana's debut	
