= 200m Saki no Netsu =

Japanese manga series

- First tankōbon volume cover

200m先の熱
- Genre: Romance
- Manga
- Written by: Miyoshi Tomori
- Published by: Shueisha
- Imprint: Margaret Comics Cookie
- Magazine: Cookie
- Original run: September 26, 2020 – present
- Volumes: 17

200m Saki no Netsu (200m先の熱) is a Japanese manga series written and illustrated by Miyoshi Tomori. It began serialization in Shueisha's shōjo manga magazine Cookie in September 2020.

== Plot ==
Tsumugu Kikka, a 28-year-old woman, lives alone on the second floor of an apartment building and works from home as a wasai, producing traditional Japanese clothing. Her work is commissioned by Mashimo, her high school ex-boyfriend, who still lives exactly 200 meters away. Kikka's quiet routine is disrupted when she is unexpectedly selected to serve on the apartment complex's management board, where she meets Hirara, a man who lives 200 meters directly above her in the same building. As Kikka's interactions with Hirara increase through apartment-related duties, unresolved feelings connected to Mashimo resurface, placing her at the center of a horizontal and vertical romantic triangle.

== Publication ==
Written and illustrated by Miyoshi Tomori, 200m Saki no Netsu began serialization in Shueisha's shōjo manga magazine Cookie on September 26, 2020. Its chapters have been collected into seventeen tankōbon volumes as of September 2026.

| No. | Release date | ISBN |
|---|---|---|
| 1 | January 25, 2021 | 978-4-08-844453-6 |
| 2 | July 21, 2021 | 978-4-08-844545-8 |
| 3 | December 24, 2021 | 978-4-08-844572-4 |
| 4 | March 25, 2022 | 978-4-08-844622-6 |
| 5 | July 25, 2022 | 978-4-08-844665-3 |
| 6 | November 25, 2022 | 978-4-08-844681-3 |
| 7 | March 24, 2023 | 978-4-08-844765-0 |
| 8 | July 24, 2023 | 978-4-08-844806-0 |
| 9 | November 24, 2023 | 978-4-08-844821-3 |
| 10 | March 25, 2024 | 978-4-08-843004-1 |
| 11 | July 25, 2024 | 978-4-08-843043-0 |
| 12 | November 25, 2024 | 978-4-08-843064-5 |
| 13 | March 25, 2025 | 978-4-08-843120-8 |
| 14 | July 25, 2025 | 978-4-08-843163-5 |
| 15 | November 25, 2025 | 978-4-08-843201-4 |
| 16 | May 25, 2026 | 978-4-08-843249-6 |
| 17 | September 25, 2026 | 978-4-08-843299-1 |

== See also ==
- A Devil and Her Love Song, another manga series by Miyoshi Tomori
