= Cookie (Japanese magazine) =

Manga magazine

- Cover of the January 2009 issue (featuring Nana by Ai Yazawa)
- Categories: Shōjo/Josei manga
- Frequency: Bi-monthly
- Circulation: 13,000; (July–September 2026)
- Founded: 2000
- Company: Shueisha
- Country: Japan
- Language: Japanese
- Website: cookie.shueisha.co.jp

Cookie (Japanese: クッキー, Hepburn: Kukkī) is a Japanese shōjo manga and josei manga magazine published bi-monthly by Shueisha, with issues released on the 26th of odd-numbered months. It launched in 2000; a simultaneously published digital edition of the magazine is also available as of 2015.

In 2008, the average circulation of Cookie was about 175,000; by 2015 it had dropped to 56,000. The publisher reported an average circulation of 19,000 in 2022 and 16,000 in 2024.

== History ==
Cookie is a sister magazine of Ribon (りぼん), Shueisha's longest-running shōjo manga magazine.

Another sister magazine of Ribon, named Ribon Deluxe (りぼんデラックス) was a quarterly magazine that ran from 1975 until 1978, with 11 issues published in total. It was replaced in 1978 by Bouquet (ぶ〜け), the first A5-sized shōjo manga magazine, which was published monthly until its March 2000 issue on February 16, 2000.

In 1996, the Ribon editing department at Shueisha began publishing a manga magazine called Ribon Teens which featured various Ribon manga artists both up-and-coming at the time and already popular, such as Ai Yazawa, Miho Obana and Mihona Fujii, as well as classic Ribon manga artists, such as Jun Hasegawa, Koi Ikeno and Aoi Hiiragi. The Ribon Teens magazine folded in 1997, and in 1999, Shueisha revived the Ribon Teens concept as a new magazine called Cookie. The former Bouquet editing department became the Cookie editing department; Cookie's editor-in-chief had previously been the editor-in-chief of Ribon.

Cookie began publication monthly starting in May 2000 with the release of the July 2000 issue. It switched to bi-monthly publication as of July 2012.

The manga artists featured in Cookie were a mixture of former Bouquet artists (some series that ran in Bouquet, such as Toriko Chiya's Clover and Yumi Ikefuji's Zoccha no Nichijou, were transferred to Cookie) and former Ribon artists such as Miho Obana and Ai Yazawa. There were some up-and-coming artists as well. Manga artist Mari Okazaki described that the magazine at its beginning felt stylish and fresh, as the two separate schools of Bouquet and Ribon merged in the magazine. She felt like she had a high degree of artistic freedom in the magazine.

The most commercially successful manga published in Cookie is Ai Yazawa's Nana. It was one of the first manga to run in Cookie. Its book publications sold more than 50 million times and it has been adapted into an anime as well as two live-action films.

A digital edition of Cookie was launched on April 1, 2015, beginning with the May 2015 issue. To celebrate the launch, the March 2015 issue, previously published in print on January 26, 2015, was also temporarily made available digitally from April 1 to May 31, 2015. Digital editions were released on the 1st of even-numbered months following publication in print. Starting from the January 2019 issue, published on November 26, 2018, the publication schedule was adjusted to make digital and print versions of the magazine available on the same day.

Based on a reader survey conducted by Shueisha in 2023, Cookie's primary demographics are adults in their 30s and older, with 7.1% of readers aged 30–34, 13.6% aged 35–39, 20.0% aged 40–44, and 44.5% aged over 45. Its average circulation was approximately 16,000 for the period of October 2022–September 2023.

== Serializations ==
=== Current ===
- 200m Saki no Netsu (2020–present) by Miyoshi Tomori
- Tokimeki Tonight Sore kara (2021–present) by Koi Ikeno
- Birdland no Sara (2023–present) by Katsuta Bun
- Bara na Mainichi (2023–present) by Haruka Aizawa
- Ai Dake Shiranai (2024–present) by Kaeru Yamamoto

==== Hiatus ====
- Nana (2000–2009) by Ai Yazawa

=== Finished ===
- Clover (2000–2006) by Toriko Chiya
- Tokimeki Midnight (2002–2009) by Koi Ikeno
- Shibuya ku Maruyama cho (2003–2004, 2007–2009) by Mari Okazaki
- Honey Bitter (2004–2018) by Miho Obana
- Kiyoku Yawaku (2004–2010) by Ryo Ikuemi
- Good Morning Kiss (2007–2022) by Yue Takasuka
- Cheer Boys!! (2011–2013) by Ayaka Matsumoto and Ryō Asai
- Papa no Iukoto o Kikinasai ~Miu-sama no Iu Tōri!~ (2011–2012) by Tomoo Katou and Tomohiro Matsu
- Akazukin Chacha N (2012–2019) by Min Ayahana
- Mr. Osomatsu (2018–2020) by Masako Shitara
