= Koi Ikeno =

Japanese manga artist

- 池野 恋
- Born: April 16, 1959 (age 67); Hanamaki, Iwate Prefecture, Japan
- Notable work: Tokimeki Tonight; Nurse Angel Ririka SOS

Koi Ikeno (池野 恋, Ikeno Koi; born April 16, 1959) is a manga author and illustrator. She was born April 16, 1959, in Hanamaki, Iwate Prefecture, Japan.

She created Tokimeki Tonight in the 1980s and Nurse Angel Ririka in the 1990s, two manga series which received anime adaptations that ran while the manga was ongoing.

== Works ==
Her works include both short manga and series.

=== Short manga ===
- Happy End Story (Happy Endものがたり, Hapī Endo Monogatari) (one-shot, 1979 in Ribon special issue, collected in Chotto Otogibanashi)
- Doyō no Gogo wa Tsurazue Tsuite (土曜の午後は頬づえついて) (collected in Chotto Otogibanashi)
- Terepashii ni Goyou Gokoro! (テレパシーにご用心!, Terepashī ni Goyō Gokoro) (one-shot, November 1979 issue of Ribon, collected in Chotto Otogibanashi)
- Tonari no One Pattern (となりのワン・パターン, Tonari no Wan Patān) (one-shot, March 1980 issue of Ribon, collected in Chotto Otogibanashi)
- Chotto Otogibanashi (ちょっとおとぎ話) (one-shot, July 1980 issue of Ribon, collected in Chotto Otogibanashi)
- Mai-chan Non-Stop (舞ちゃんノン・ストップ, Mai-chan Non-Sutoppu) (three chapters, January-March 1981, collected in Mai-chan Non-Stop)
- Meddler ½ (おじゃま虫½, Ojama Mushi ½) (one-shot, June 1981 issue of Ribon, collected in Mai-chan Non-Stop)
- Kimagure Time Machine (きまぐれタイム・マシン, Kimagure Taimu Mashin) (collected in I Want to Become a Heroine)
- Yumemiru Tamago (夢見るタマゴ) (October 1993 in Ribon Original, collected in Ikeno Koi Exciting Short Story Collection)
- Midsummer Door (真夏のドア, Manatsu no Doa) (Ribon summer special issue 1998, collected in Liars' Season)
- Lady Angel (レディ・エンジェル, Redi Enjeru) (February 2000 in Ribon Original, collected in Ikeno Koi Exciting Short Story Collection)
- Midwinter Chime (真冬のチャイム, Mafuyu no Chaimu) (, collected in Ikeno Koi Exciting Short Story Collection)
- Frame of If (ifの額縁, Ifu no Furēmu) (September 2010 in Cookie, collected in Frame of If)
- Gift of the Wind (風のおくりもの, Kaze no Okurimono) (2011 in Comic Iwate)
- Wakamurasaki (わかむらさき) (2013 in Cookie, Ribon Mascot Comics, Shueisha, ISBN 978-4-08-867289-2)
- Bloody Bride: Vampire Dating (ブラッディ・ブライド-吸血鬼の婚活-, Buraddi Buraido: Kyūketsuki no Konkatsu) (May 2020 - January 2021 in Cookie, Ribon Mascot Comics, Shueisha, ISBN 978-4-08-867670-8)

=== Series ===
- Mechanko Kyōshitsu (めちゃんこ教室) (1981-1982 in Ribon, 1 volume, Ribon Mascot Comics, Shueisha, ISBN 4-08-853231-7)
- I Want to Become a Heroine (ヒロインになりたい, Hiroin ni Naritai) (January - March 1991 in Ribon, collected in I Want to Become a Heroine)
- Nurse Angel Ririka SOS (January 1995 – June 1996, 4 volumes, Ribon Mascot Comics, Shueisha)
- Oshiete Nanoka (おしえて菜花) (1996-1998, 4 volumes, Ribon Mascot Comics, Shueisha)
- Liars' Season (うそつきなシーズン, Usotsuki na Shīzun) (1998-1999 in Ribon Original, collected in Liars' Season)
- Misty Boy (ミスティボーイ, Misuti Bōi) (October 2001, Ribon Mascot Comics, Shueisha, ISBN 4088563239)

==== Tokimeki series ====
- Tokimeki Tonight (July 1982 – October 1994 in Ribon, 30 volumes, Ribon Mascot Comics, Shueisha)
- Tokimeki Tonight: Hoshi no Yukue (2000, 1 volume, Ribon Mascot Comics, Shueisha, ISBN 4-08-856201-1)
- Tokimeki Tonight Side Story: Itsumo Tokimeite (いつもときめいて) (September 2009 in Cookie, collected in Frame of If)
- Tokimeki Midnight (2002-2009 in Cookie, 9 volumes, Shueisha)
- Tokimeki Midnight Side Story: Itsumo Tokimeite (いつもときめいて) (October 2009 in Cookie, collected in Frame of If)
- Tokimeki Tonight: Sore kara (2021-present in Cookie, 3 volumes as of November 2023, Shueisha)

=== Collections ===
- Chotto Otogibanashi (ちょっとおとぎ話) (December 1980, Ribon Mascot Comics, Shueisha, ISBN 4-08-853192-2)
- Mai-chan Non-Stop (舞ちゃんノン・ストップ, Mai-chan Non-Sutoppu) (October 1981, Ribon Mascot Comics, Shueisha, ISBN 4-08-853215-5)
- I Want to Become a Heroine (ヒロインになりたい, Hiroin ni Naritai) (July 1991, Ribon Mascot Comics, Shueisha, ISBN 4-08-853572-3)
- Liars' Season (うそつきなシーズン, Usotsuki na Shīzun) (September 1999, Ribon Mascot Comics, Shueisha, ISBN 4-08-856164-3)
- Ikeno Koi Exciting Short Story Collection (池野恋 ときめき短編集, Ikeno Koi Tokimeki Tanpen Shū) (August 2009, Ribon Mascot Comics, Shueisha, ISBN 4-08-867005-1)
- Frame of If (ifの額縁, Ifu no Furēmu) (February 2011, Ribon Mascot Comics, Shueisha, ISBN 978-4-08-867105-5)
