= Min Ayahana =

Japanese manga artist

Min Ayahana 彩花 みん
- Born: February 3, 1969 (age 57) Nanao, Ishikawa, Japan
- Area: Manga artist
- Notable works: Akazukin Chacha

Min Ayahana (彩花 みん, Ayahana Min; born February 3, 1969) is a Japanese manga artist, born in Nanao in Ishikawa, Japan. She debuted with the manga Warera High School Hero, published in the 1991 Autumn issue of Ribon Bikkuri Daizoukan. Her best-known work is Akazukin Chacha (Red Riding Hood Chacha).

== Works ==
Title	Year	Notes	Refs
Akazukin Chacha		Serialized by Ribon magazine Published by Shueisha in 13 volumes	
Akazukin Chacha N	2011–2019	Serialized monthly by Cookie (Japanese magazine); Published by Shueisha in 5 volumes	
Gonta o korose! (ごん太を殺せ!)		Short Story collection Serialized by Ribon magazine Published by Shueisha in 1 volumes	
Pyon (ぴょん)		Short Story collection Serialized by Ribon magazine Published by Shueisha in 1 volumes	
