= Kodocha =

Japanese manga series

- Cover of the first manga volume

こどものおもちゃ (Kodomo no Omocha)
- Genre: Comedy drama
- Manga
- Written by: Miho Obana
- Published by: Shueisha
- English publisher: NA: Tokyopop; Shueisha (digital)
- Imprint: Ribon Mascot Comics
- Magazine: Ribon
- Original run: August 1994 – November 1998
- Volumes: 10
- Original video animation
- Directed by: Ibu Suzuki
- Studio: J.C.Staff
- Released: December 16, 1995
- Runtime: 30 minutes
- Anime television series
- Directed by: Akitaro Daichi
- Produced by: Noriko Kobayashi (TV Tokyo); Yoko Matsushita (NAS)
- Written by: Ryusuke Takahashi (episodes 1-82); Miharu Hinami (episodes 83-102)
- Music by: Keiichi Tomita; Jun Abe; Seiji Muto
- Studio: Studio Gallop
- Licensed by: NA: Discotek Media
- Original network: TXN (TV Tokyo)
- English network: US: Funimation Channel, Colours TV
- Original run: April 5, 1996 – March 27, 1998
- Episodes: 102 (104 segments)

Kodocha (Japanese: こどものおもちゃ, Hepburn: Kodomo no Omocha; lit. 'Child's Toy') is a Japanese manga series written and illustrated by Miho Obana. The series was adapted as an OVA by J.C. Staff and released on December 16, 1995, by Shueisha under their Ribon Video label. An anime television series was produced by NAS and TV Tokyo, animated by Studio Gallop, and broadcast on TV Tokyo every Friday from April 5, 1996, to March 27, 1998.

In 2002, the manga was published in North America in English by Tokyopop as Kodocha: Sana's Stage. In 2006, Tokyopop lost the license to the manga, leaving it out of print. In 2005, the first half of the anime series was licensed for North American distribution by Funimation Entertainment and has been released on DVD. In 2012, Funimation announced that their Kodocha DVDs went out of print.

In 2020, Discotek Media released Season 1 and 2 of the show on SD Blu-ray in 2021 and 2022.

Both the manga and anime have been well received by publications for different media for the character interactions and the comedy. The manga won the 1998 Kodansha Manga Award for shōjo manga. At the American Anime Awards held in 2007, it was nominated for best comedy anime.

== Plot ==
Sana Kurata is a cheerful, popular, and energetic child actress who attends an elementary school that is plagued with chaos, led mainly by an aloof boy named Akito Hayama. At first, the two come in conflict with each other because of their opposing ideals, but as they get to know each other, they start supporting both each other and their classmates and peers. It's a story about kids dealing with adult issues. It showcases family struggles, communication gaps, and the challenges of growing up. Following them from sixth grade through their first year of secondary school.

== Characters ==
=== Main characters ===
Sana Kurata (倉田 紗南, Kurata Sana)
Voiced by: Chisa Yokoyama (OVA), Shizue Oda (TV series) (Japanese); Laura Bailey (English)
At the start of the series, Sana is an exuberant child actress who has been having a hard time at school due to the antics of troublemaker Akito Hayama. Sana sets out to stop him and bring peace to her world; however, she soon learns that there is more to Akito than it seems. While she is energetic and always has a smile on her face, she also has a short temper and fierce determination. She never backs down from a fight, especially against Akito.
Sana was adopted by her mother Misako as an infant after Misako found her abandoned on a park bench. At her mother's behest, she began her acting career at the Komawari Theater Troupe when she was five years old, and now stars in a popular variety program called Child's Toy, as well as several commercials. During the course of the series, her career flourishes. She stars in multiple TV dramas and a feature film. Sana also deals with many ups-and-downs of show business, such as competitive co-stars, rabid fans, zealous paparazzi, false rumors in tabloids, ruthless talent managers who try to poach her, and in the anime, even an imposter.
From the beginning of the series, she developed a strong rivalry with Akito and gradually falls in love with him, although she doesn't realize it until after he starts dating Fuka.
In a 2009 one-shot called Deep Clear, Sana asks for help from a detective. In Deep Clear, Sana is separated from Akito because Akito told her to divorce him if she chooses to have the baby, but she longed to raise the baby with him. They reconcile when their daughter is born. Although they are married, Sana and Akito still argue.
Akito Hayama (羽山 秋人, Hayama Akito)
Voiced by: Megumi Ogata (OVA), Tatsuya Nakazaki (TV series) (Japanese); Jerry Jewell (English)
Akito is the troublemaker who is causing chaos in Sana's sixth grade class. A sullen boy of few words, he is physically strong, and has a powerful karate chop. At the beginning of the series, it is shown that Akito has acrophobia. Akito's mother died when giving birth to him, which leads to his older sister Natsumi resenting him, frequently becoming angry with Akito and calling him "devil boy." In addition, Akito has a distant relationship with his father, who works long hours. As a result, Akito is not home often and usually eats junk food for dinner. Akito is disrespectful towards most adults in general, but upon meeting Sana's formidable mother, he speaks to her with deference. Akito gets good grades despite being a troublemaker.
After he butts heads with Sana several times, Sana succeeds in subduing Akito after blackmailing him, the same way he was blackmailing their teacher. Once the initial blackmailing passes, Akito ends up regretting what he did, and his friendship with Sana continues to open his heart. Sana also helps him have a better relationship with his family, after which they become even closer. Although he has his moments, he has had to grow up fast due to his tough home life. Smiling rarely, and laughing almost never, several characters note that Akito's eyes are not that of a child. Akito has his own code of honor: Akito will never lie, and he refuses to pretend to be nice to anyone he doesn't like or respect. Akito's most effusive expression of love is "I don't hate it", which he reserves for sushi, dinosaurs, skiing, and Sana. As the story progresses Akito's love for Sana grows, but Sana is oblivious to this until much later.
Inspired in part by Sana's devotion to her acting career, Akito begins to take karate classes. In the manga, towards the end of the story, Akito is injured and unable to move his hand. He moves to America due to his father's job, and the resulting shock triggers Sana's illness. When he returns to Japan two years later in the final issue, Akito has become a champion child karate fighter, as well as being able to speak flawless English.
In a 2009 one-shot called Deep Clear, Sana asks for help from a detective. In Deep Clear, it is revealed that Akito is living separately from Sana as Sana's manager, Rei, asked a detective to investigate him to see if he cheated on Sana. From Sana's memories, it was shown that he threatened to leave her if she went through with the pregnancy. Later on, with the admission of Sana and the detective's own powers, she came to understand that Akito is scared about the risks of a premature birth due to his past and doesn't want to lose Sana. They are reunited when Sana goes into labor.
Rei Sagami (相模 玲, Sagami Rei)
Voiced by: Masami Kikuchi (OVA), Ryō Naitō (TV series) (Japanese); John Burgmeier (English)
Rei is Sana's manager. After being dumped by his girlfriend, dropping out of college, and his parents' death, he hits rock bottom and becomes a homeless person. While begging on the streets, Sana finds him and brings him home much like she does with stray dogs. Misako decided to keep him around the house, and he has lived there ever since, working as Sana's manager. Sana declares him as her "pimp" after reading a book which included the word, although she does not understand what it really means. In addition, Sana thinks of Rei as her boyfriend. Later, Akito tells Sana that Rei is playing with her, and sees her simply as a little girl wanting to play. Misako also tells Sana that Rei cannot be her boyfriend. This leaves Sana devastated. But after she gets over her heartbreak, Rei remains her manager and her friend. Throughout the series, Sana looks up to Rei as a surrogate father as Rei looks up to her as his own child.
Tsuyoshi Ohki (大木 剛, Ōki Tsuyoshi)
Voiced by: Minami Takayama (OVA), Mayumi Misawa (TV series) (Japanese); Greg Ayres (English)
Tsuyoshi Ohki (大木剛, Ōki Tsuyoshi) is Akito's soft-spoken and smart best friend, they've known each other since kindergarten. Although usually gentle, when Tsuyoshi gets extremely angry, he flies into a rage and begins to attack everything - and usually only Akito can calm him. Tsuyoshi plays a very background role in the manga, but at the beginning he is Akito's rival for Sana's love. Later, his parents divorce, and as Tsuyoshi Sasaki (佐々木剛, Sasaki Tsuyoshi), he has to cope with being a father figure as well as a big brother to his little sister.
Aya Sugita (杉田 亜矢, Sugita Aya)
Voiced by: Akiko Kikuchi (Japanese); Monica Rial (English)
Aya is one of Sana's friends, and later Tsuyoshi's girlfriend. She is a quiet and sweet girl, with a good deal of common sense, but when angry or jealous she can become very dangerous. Aya and Tsuyoshi become a sickeningly sweet "love-love" couple.
Fuka Matsui (松井 風花, Matsui Fūka)
Voiced by: Harumi Ikoma
Fuka is introduced as a classmate when Sana and her classmates begin junior high school. Fuka just moved back to Tokyo after living in Osaka, and she and Sana become best friends. They start to meet at the bathroom, where Fuka complains about cutting her hair too short. Fuka explains that some people thinks she looks like Sana. It is revealed that Akito went to kindergarten with Fuka, and kissed her when they were five years old. Although Fuka initially hates Akito for stealing her first kiss, after getting to know him better, she is impressed by his blunt honesty and logical point-of-view. Fuka's personality is very similar to Sana's, which is why Tsuyoshi probably thinks that she is Akito's type. Fuka dates Akito when Sana goes to shoot a movie. Eventually, Fuka realizes that Akito really loves Sana, so she breaks up with him. Asides from the fact that they dated, Fuka was also the other girl besides Sana to whom Akito has said "I don't hate you" to. Although their relationship did not work out, Akito and Fuka genuinely appreciated and respected each other. She was in love boy named Yuta Takaishi, but they broke up because Akito kissed Fuka. When they meet again after while she said that she won't want to start relationship with him, but later Sana and Akito found out Takaishi's phone number and called him and get his phone number and address up and gave it to Fuka. First she was angry and embarrassed, then when she was home she thinks that she could call him someday and wonders what was that fuzzy and warm feeling that she felt, and also that she would thank Sana for this someday.
Naozumi Kamura (加村 直澄, Kamura Naozumi)
Voiced by: Omi Minami (Japanese); Chris Patton (English)
Naozumi is also a child actor, and another competitor for Sana's love. Naozumi has a history with Sana: when they were babies, they both spent time together at the Kamura orphanage. In the manga, when Sana's illness was triggered at a young age, Naozumi is the one who helped her recover (although Sana thought Naozumi was a girl due to his long hair). At the end of the series, Naozumi makes the painful decision to give up his love for Sana, but remains her loyal friend. In the final book of the manga, Naozumi leaves the country to film another movie and advance his career.
In the TV series, Naozumi is central to a major story arc in which he and Sana travel to New York City to be featured in a Broadway musical. During this trip, Naozumi unexpectedly encounters both of his birth parents. The trauma of these events bring him and Sana closer, and when they come back to Japan they start dating.
Asako Kurumi (来海 麻子, Kurumi Asako)
Voiced by: Akemi Okamura (OVA), Azusa Nakao (TV series) (Japanese); Luci Christian (English)
Asako is a popular actress. She was also Rei's girlfriend who dumped him to concentrate on her acting career, which partly triggered his downward spiral to homeless bum. She did not know that Rei would end up homeless. When she finds Rei again, she wants to get back together, but Rei says that he belongs to Sana now, and can't be with Asako until Sana grows up. When Sana realizes that Rei is not her "pimp" nor her boyfriend, Asako and Rei reunite.
Babbit (ばびっと, Babitto)
Voiced by: Tomoko Hikita (Japanese); Chris Cason (English)
A mascot character that is a cross between a bat and a rabbit. Appearing mainly in the anime television series, it provides commentary on some of the events of the episode.

=== Family members ===
Misako Kurata (倉田 美紗子, Kurata Misako)
Voiced by: Sakurako Kishiro (OVA), Hana Kino (TV series) (Japanese); Colleen Clinkenbeard (English)
Misako is Sana's adoptive mother. Misako is a beautiful, intelligent, indomitable and goofy woman. She married a no-good gambling addict at age 18, and divorced him at 20. After her divorce, she decided that being normal just was not "her", and began wearing kimono, wearing her hair in odd ways, and felt liberated by being eccentric. She found Sana on a park bench and took her to the Kamura orphanage until she officially adopted her. When Sana was only five, Misako vows to be a famous author, and asks Sana to become better known than the average girl by becoming a small-time actress, so that they could find Sana's real mother one day. Misako and Sana are successful in their efforts beyond their original goals: Misako becomes an award-winning novelist, and Sana becomes one of the most popular child stars of her day. Misako then writes a controversial book named "My Daughter and I", hoping to find Sana's real mother.
Misako loves Sana deeply, and raises Sana with a balance between discipline and letting her be independent, thereby teaching her not to be a spoiled child. While Misako lets Sana make much of her own decisions, she will also not let Sana avoid the consequences of her actions. And when it comes time for Sana to realize that Rei is not her boyfriend, Misako holds nothing back, despite knowing that Sana will be hurt and humiliated. Misako also takes a liking to Akito: after learning that Akito kissed Sana, Misako tells him, "Do it as much as possible. It's fun!"
Natsumi Hayama (羽山 夏美, Hayama Natsumi)
Voiced by: Michiko Neya (OVA), Akemi Okamura (TV series) (Japanese); Caitlin Glass (English)
Akito's older sister. Natsumi is an avid Sana-fan. As a result of grief and stress from growing up without a mother and having to take care of a younger brother, Natsumi is pretty mean to Akito and accuses him of causing their mother's death. She often yells at him and calls him a "devil." (She calls him "Monster" in the American version of the anime and "Demon" in the Japanese version of the anime.) After Sana scolds her and her father, and Natsumi watches a TV drama that Sana filmed, Natsumi realizes that they are mistreating Akito, and starts being nicer to him. Also showing the fact that she becomes overprotective of him which shows in the last episode when she freaks out when she sees him in bandages. Like her brother, she has a difficult personality but she's also very intelligent.
Fuyuki Hayama (羽山 冬騎, Hayama Fuyuki)
Voiced by: Masayuki Omoro (OVA), Takashi Matsuyama (TV series) (Japanese); Randy Tallman (English)
Akito's father is a business executive who works long hours and is seldom home. Although it seems in the beginning that he is a bad father, Mr. Hayama turns out to be a good father who was simply unaware of the bad relationship between his children because he was working too hard. After realizing Akito's suffering, and also becoming ill due to working too hard, he begins to spend more time at home. When Akito gets into various scrapes during the series, Mr. Hayama always believes in his son and supports him, even when no one else does. This could partially be attributed to the fact that he and Akito's mother were troublemakers in their younger years.
Mr. Hayama is very mellow and soft-spoken, but the few moments he breaks out of his quiet mode are very funny. He takes a great liking to Sana and develops a goofy habit of talking to the TV whenever she appears.
Koharu Hayama (羽山 小春, Hayama Koharu)
Voiced by: Omi Minami (Japanese); Amber Cotton (English)
Akito's mother who died giving birth to him, an event which had a serious negative effect on the relationship between Akito and his family. Although she has been dead for more than ten years by the beginning of the series: she "appears" sporadically throughout the manga in memories, photos, and flashbacks. In volume 8, when Akito is needing surgery, Koharu appears and tells him that he is too young to die and that he can be strong. When Akito realizes that she is his mother, Koharu tells Akito that she loves him and that he must live for both of them.
Aono Ohki (大木 碧乃, Ōki Aono)
Voiced by: Miwa Matsumoto (Japanese); Luci Christian (English)
Tsuyoshi's adorable younger sister. She is a fan of Sana. Aono carries around a store-bought egg in the hope that one day it will hatch into a chicken. One day, Sana buys a chick, and swaps it with Aono's egg when she isn't looking. Akito calls Sana an idiot for doing this because someday, Aono will realize what happened, and will feel stupid and humiliated. But Sana insists that as a child you should have dreams, and that the happiness it will bring Aono will be worth the small amount of grief later, because grief goes away, but happy memories are forever.
Keiko Sakai (坂井 佳子, Sakai Keiko)
Voiced by: Mika Doi (Japanese); Amy Rosenthal (English)
Sana's biological mother, a very shy and insecure young woman who gave birth to Sana when she was only 14. In the manga it is revealed that her uncle made her pregnant, and she gave birth in a bathtub. Keiko says that she was very much in love with Sana's birth father, but that he has died. When Misako finally meets her, after Keiko offers proof about her bond to Sana, she slaps Keiko and says that even animals know they have to take care of their offspring. She also arranges Sana to meet her. Sana was worried about meeting Keiko, because she was afraid that Misako would give her up; she finds out that Misako had the same worry, that Sana would leave with Keiko. After meeting Keiko, Sana and Misako conclude that it's what in the heart that defines your family, and that they are truly mother and daughter. After meeting Sana, Keiko asks if it is possible that one day Sana would come to live with her. Sana gently but firmly says that she considers Misako as her mom, although she's grateful to Keiko for bringing her to the world.
Mariko Sakai (坂井 まり子, Sakai Mariko)
Voiced by: Ayaka Saitō (Japanese); Tierney Titus (English)
Sana's younger half-sister, who is Keiko's daughter. She appears in a total of four pages, but also on the cover of the final book. She is a fan of Sana, not knowing that Sana is her older half-sister. After meeting Keiko, Sana spends one day having fun at a theme park with Akito, Tsuyoshi and Mariko. Although Sana enjoys her day with Mariko, she realizes that she doesn't feel a familial bond with her or Keiko. Episode 023 of the anime is dedicated to Mariko, where she wanders off to see Sana when a remote for Child's Toy is shot right by her house. She then gets on the channel 108 bus, unbeknownst to everyone but Zenjiro, and then wanders around the studio. Keiko ends up calling Misako for help in finding her "lost" daughter.

=== School characters ===
Shinichi Gomi (五味 真一, Gomi Shinichi)
Voiced by: Miki Nagasawa (OVA), Masanobu Hirota (TV series) (Japanese); Kent Williams (English)
A boy in Sana's 6th grade class. He had long hair, but his father makes him shave it all off when he starts middle school. When Akito decides not to terrorize the teachers anymore, Gomi decides he will be the leader, but gets beat down by Akito (with Sana's one-time permission). In a story arc that showcases Akito's integrity, Gomi rebels against his parents who pressure him to attend a prestigious middle school. Gomi beats Akito up with the help of older delinquents, and shoplifts, letting Akito take the blame. He later confesses and apologizes to Akito.
Hisae Kumagai (熊谷 ひさえ, Kumagai Hisae)
Voiced by: Yumiko Kikuchi (Japanese); Cynthia Cranz (English)
Hisae is one of Sana and Aya's school friends who stays throughout the series. When Sana forgets to attend her birthday party, she becomes very angry and tries to ostracize Sana, but forgives her later. She and Gomi fight a lot but they are close friends despite that.
Mami Suzuki (鈴木 まみ, Suzuki Mami)
Voiced by: Azusa Nakao (Japanese); Kate Oxley (English)
Mami is one of Sana's friends. She is a quiet girl, with short black hair kept back by a hairband. During Akito's troublemaker days, she calls Akito a "devil", the same word his sister uses to insult him. Akito gets revenge by getting the other boys to throw Mami into a pond, which causes Sana to become angrier than she's ever been. Mami remains traumatized by this incident for quite a while afterwards. She remains so afraid of Akito that when he tries to talk to her, she screams and cries. But when she sees that Akito regrets what he did, they get over it.
Principal Narunaru (なるなる校長, Narunaru Kōchō)
Voiced by: Chafurin (Japanese); Christopher Sabat (English)
The principal of Jinbo Elementary School. Narunaru is popular, easy-going, and always says "Everything will be all right." The only time he's ever gotten mad is when he learned that Akito once made Miss Mitsuya cry. It was Principal Narunaru who suggests that Akito study karate. His near-identical older twin brother is the principal of Jinbo Middle School.
Tanaka (田中)
Voiced by: Shigeru Nakahara (OVA), Mitsuo Iwata (TV series) (Japanese); Chuck Huber (English)
Tanaka is the P.E. Coach and teacher. He was being blackmailed by Akito Hayama with a picture of him and Mitsuya (三屋, Mitsuya), another teacher.
Sumire Ando (安藤 すみれ, Andō Sumire)
Voiced by: Ai Satō (Japanese); Julie Mayfield (English)
She wears contemporary horn-rimmed glasses, and a considerable amount of makeup. She is considered the school's bossiest teacher and frequently gets angry at the children. When she gets mad, usually after a child (mostly Akito) comments that her "real face is showing", her makeup cracks off her face prompting her to reapply it quickly. She also has a crush on Zenjiro, and is quite fond of the limbo. While mean, she's stated that the real reason she became a teacher was to make children happy, but she began worrying about losing face with the students and started worrying more about discipline.
Sengoku (千石)
Voiced by: Daiki Nakamura
Akito's homeroom teacher in middle school. Sengoku despises Akito and picks on him relentlessly. He believes Akito is a violent and dangerous boy by nature and cannot be changed. Akito, on the other hand, pegs Sengoku as the unfair and spiteful person he is, and refuses to curry Sengoku's favor. Sengoku once hits Akito, but will not admit it, and tries on several occasions to get Akito expelled.

=== Show business colleagues ===
Mikio Ono (小野 幹雄, Ono Mikio)
Voiced by: Takeshi Matsuyama
Director of the Mizu no Yakata movie Naozumi & Sana starred in. He likes to take risks in his movies that put both himself & his crew in danger. He has long black hair & a huge scar on his face.
Mayu Tobita (飛田 まゆ, Tobita Mayu)
Voiced by: Kaori Asoh (Japanese); Leah Clark (English)
A young singer, about the same age as Sana herself. Tobita is a strict actress who takes her work seriously to the point of being stuck-up. She regards Sana as a rival and finds Sana's laid-back attitude extremely irritating. She also gets jealous when Naozumi talks to Sana.
Tomomi Ayanohanamarukoji (綾乃花丸小路 智美, Ayanohanamarukōji Tomomi)
Voiced by: Tomomi Nishimura (Japanese); Brina Palencia (English)
She appears alongside Mayu. Tomomi is a very quiet girl, but can be persuasive if she wishes to be. She, Mayu, and Sana together form the singing group Sho-Roku-Tai (少六隊, Shō-Roku-Tai).
Zenjiro (ぜんじろう, Zenjirō)
Voiced by: Zenjiro (Japanese); Sonny Strait (English)
A regular character in the anime television series, Zenjiro hosts the Child's Toy television series that Sana appears in. His character is a parody of hosts on Japanese television variety shows, and is voiced by the real-life television personality with the same name; he is also shown to have buck teeth.
Miho Obana (小花 美穂, Obana Miho)
The author appears as herself in some of the quiz-show styled recap episodes in the anime. She doesn't say much, only the phrase: "Obana here."

=== Other characters ===
Ryousuke Kashima (鹿島 隆介, Kashima Ryousuke)
Voiced by: Kenjirou Tsuda (Japanese); Mike McFarland (English)
Misako's ex-husband. He is a gambling addict who kept showing up over and over again asking his ex-wife Misako for money. But in the end he is thrown out by Misako with some random gadget she had recently purchased.
Takeshi Gojo (ゴジョ 武志, Gojo Takeshi)
Voiced by: Hiroshi Takahashi (Japanese); John Gremillion (English)
As famous male actor and is Sana's pretend-father in the Late Night Murder Mystery Theatre, and later revealed to be her biological father. Not long after they started working together, reporters started believing that they were actually father and daughter (they did not know they actually were yet) and Sana breezily declared that they were lovers which they later become. Takeshi is quite chilled usually. He is funny, and he shares a lot in common with Sana. He speaks slowly and can be very comforting. He enjoys surprising people in the wackiest ways possible; in the series he suffered from a chronic illness which is the reason why he doesn't get very large roles when it comes to his career. His illness catches up with him leading to his death in the anime.
Brad (ブラッド, Buraddo)
Voiced by: Tatsuya Nakazaki
An American version of Hayama, who lives in New York at Gary Hamilton's mansion. He is the son of the Maid, Ramsey (who looks a lot like Shimura). He looks exactly like Hayama, but with different hair and eye color. He also has complete opposite personality from Hayama. Brad is also arrogant, mischievous and is always seen smiling. He has feelings for Sicil but Sicil likes Naozumi, so this drives Brad to try and scare Naozumi and Sana into returning to Japan. He knows the Hamilton secret. By the end of the New York episode, he begins to like Sana and Naozumi.
Sicil Hamilton (シチェル・ハミルトン, Shicheru Hamiruton)
Voiced by: Satomi Koorogi
An American female actress who works along with Brad. She's not able to dance because of an accident when she was very young. Brad is love with her and she on the other hand had a crush on Naozomi, but then her feelings changed after she found out that they were blood related.

== Production ==
Some parts of the series are based on Obana's life.

== Media ==
=== Manga ===
Kodomo no Omocha was originally serialized by Shueisha in the magazine Ribon from August 1994 to November 1998. Shueisha collected the 51 chapters in ten tankōbon volumes from April 1995 to January 1999. The series was published in North America by Tokyopop under the title Kodocha: Sana's Stage from June 25, 2002, to November 11, 2003. In 2006, Tokyopop was not able to renew the license and the English edition became out of print. In 2026, the series became licensed digitally in English on Shueisha's Manga Million platform.

In 2010, Obana authored a crossover story called Deep Clear in which Sana and Akito interact with characters from Honey Bitter. In 2015, Obana authored a one-shot of Kodomo no Omocha for Ribon magazine's 60th anniversary issue in September. In 2025, she authored an 8-page promotional comic in collaboration with the beauty salon aggregate platform Hot Pepper Beauty.

==== Chapter list ====
No.	Original release date	Original ISBN	English release date	English ISBN
1	April 1995	978-4-08-853791-7	June 25, 2002	978-1-931514-50-7
Chapters 1–5
Hayama, a tough kid, is terrorizing Sana's class. When Sana finds out that he has been blackmailing the teachers, she sets out for revenge. Tsuyoshi tells Sana that Hayama's weakness is heights, but just as he is about to confess his love for Sana, the girls have to rush off to save Mami, who Hayama is trying to drown. Sana confronts Hayama, and he pins her up against the wall, telling her not to interfere anymore. After numerous failed attempts, Sana decides that she should try to blackmail Hayama with a photograph (the same way he is doing with the teachers). She enlists Tsuyoshi's help, and stalks Hayama to his home where she finds out more than she wanted to know. Hayama's abusive sister throws him out of the house, and father blanks him. Regardless, Sana gets Tsuyoshi to pull down Hayama's trousers, at which point she takes the photo. After Hayama stops being a jerk, Sana discovers from Tsuyoshi that Hayama's mother died giving birth to him, which is why his family hates him. Coincidentally, Sana is doing a movie with a similar plot (where she plays a little girl, whose mother got terminally ill after giving birth to her, and Asako plays an older sister who is abusive). After watching the movie, Hayama's family see how wrong they were, that Hayama's mother gave all of her love, even her life, so that Hayama could live. They start treating him better, and thank Sana helping them. Sana is 11 years old at the time. "The Hayamoth": Hayama plays a trick on the forest god, who punishes him by turning into a moth. Hayama turns Sana's mom, Misako, into a moth, too. As a result, Sana and Tsuyoshi go to find the Hayama Moth and are tricked several times. Meanwhile, when Sana and Tsuyoshi are shooting the Hayamoth, (which is no use because the Hayamoth and his clones are immortal) Misako takes a bath and is cured.
2	September 1995	978-4-08-853817-4	July 23, 2002	978-1-931514-51-4
Chapters 6–10
In this book, Sana gets invited to have an interview with Asako Kurumi. When the interview begins Asako starts to ask questions about Sana's manager. Sana tells Asako about Rei's past and Asako realizes that Rei is the man whom she dumped in college after making a decision of whether she wants to become an actress or stay with Rei. When the interview is over then Sana goes to the car to see Rei. She finds out that he is not there and goes looking for him. Meanwhile, Rei is getting a soda from a vending machine and Asako spots him as she is getting in the car. She calls out his name and chases after him because he is running away from her. She finally corners him in a dark alley and asks him if the rumors are true. When he is about to answer, Sana pops up out of nowhere and starts shouting at Asako for talking to her "gigolo". As Sana is talking, a crowd of fans starts to show up. Rei rushes Sana home and tells her that she's his #1 person in her life to make her stop worrying. When he goes to help make the tea, Sana starts dancing and jumping. All of a sudden, she bumps into the bookcase in Rei's room. A box falls from the book shelf and opens. Sana is surprised to find pictures of Asako Kurumi in the box. She has a harder time believing that she's the #1 person in Rei's life right now. Things get harder for her when someone in her class decides to surprise her with a kiss. Sooner than expected, Hayama's dad passes out during dinner and he is rushed to the hospital, Hayama call's Sana and Sana comes to the hospital as well, Natsumi is crying and panicking while Hayama tries to act all cool and strong. When he gets aways from Natsumi, he slumps off and Sana arrives, he really feels bad about his dad so he and Sana shared a hug while Hayama said "What would I do if he dies?". "Weather Report": Each character presents the weather and finds an individual way of completely messing it up.
3	February 1996	978-4-08-853840-2	September 24, 2002	978-1-931514-52-1
Chapters 11–15
Tsuyoshi and Aono's parents get a divorce, but Aya manages to capture Tsuyoshi's heart by getting him a present to help him get through the difficult time. Sana's class goes on a trip which includes an overnight stay, where Sana and Akito share a moment together. Naozumi, another famous child actor arrives, doing adverts with Sana. Hayama starts Karate lessons to help him out. Misako, Sana's mother, publishes a book called 'My Daughter and I' which reveals that Sana is adopted. The press is all over her to find out more, and Hayama helps Sana to get out of the public eye. Sana is 12 years old at the time. "Cool Girl Karen vs Spicy Girl Sana": Sana challenges people on the street to take the Child's Toy challenge: to eat a particularly disgusting food! Karen is chosen from the audience, and is immediately sick- at which point she sticks food down Sana's throat, and she is sick also. The show got the best ratings out of any Child's Toy episode ever. Karen is a crossover from a different comic book; the episode is co-drawn by Mihona Fujii.
4	July 1996	978-4-08-853867-9	November 19, 2002	978-1-931514-53-8
Chapters 16–20
Sana has been attacked by the press about the book that her mother wrote, finds out that her real mother is still living in Japan, and wants to meet her. Hayama and Tsuyoshi provide support for Sana when she meets her real sister and mother at an amusement park. Naozumi, the famous child actor who works with Sana, reveals that he too is adopted and that Sana and he were raised in the same orphanage for a month. Sana hosts a half-birthday at her house, so that Hayama can celebrate his birthday. Hayama and Sana share their first consensual kiss. Sana and her friends begin seventh grade at a new school, where Sana makes a new best friend named Fuka. While introducing Fuka to Hayama, Fuka goes berserk and slaps Hayama, then reveals a secret about him. "Oponchi Sisters": Miho Obana thanks her hard-working sister.
5	December 1996	978-4-08-853892-1	January 14, 2003	978-1-59182-089-5
Chapters 21–25
Fuka explains to her friends at lunch about how she went to kindergarten with Hayama and Tsuyoshi and Hayama stole her first kiss, which broke up the relationship between Fuka and Takaishi. Sana and Fuka join the gymnastics club, then their class goes on a field trip to the zoo, where Hayama shows Sana a beautiful scenery, and Tsuyoshi and Sana talk about how Sana has no confidence or time for her love life, and she will not believe Hayama loves her unless he says so himself. Also, Hayama catches some popularity from other girls. The next day, Sana has a press conference with the rest of the cast for "Mansion of Water". Ishida asks out Sana, but Sana lies and says its true she's going out with Naozumi like the tabloids say, to get Ishida to go away. Right before Sana leaves on the bus to location to shoot the movie, Hayama sees her off, shows her his brand new brown belt he just achieved in karate, and is about to confess, but says he will talk to her when she gets back in a few months. Hayama begins longing for Sana, while she begins shooting in the mountains. When Fuka finds out Takaishi and her old friends from Osaka are coming to Tokyo to visit, she asks Hayama to pretend to be her boyfriend to show off in front of Takaishi, which makes their ties with each other more friendly. Sana is enjoying her work on location but at the end of the book, gets attacked by Naozumi's jealous fans. Sana is 13 years old at the time.
6	May 1997	978-4-08-856016-8	April 15, 2003	978-1-59182-182-3
Chapters 26–30
Sana ends up with a fractured leg from Naozumi's jealous girl fans, which makes filming harder for her. Naozumi is extremely upset about this, but Sana tells him she's mad also, but not to worry about it and keep filming. Hayama finds out Sana and Naozumi are dating from a magazine and from Ishida. Fuka asks Hayama to be her boyfriend. Sana gets the director's cell phone and is able to make a call. She calls Hayama right away and finds out that he and Fuka are dating. Sana becomes extremely shocked and goes into a state of sadness. Sana talks with Asako and realizes that she really does love Hayama. Naozumi confesses to Sana that night. Rei tells Mama to come over right away. When Mama comes she helps Sana to handle the fact that Hayama and Fuka are dating. They are finally filming the scene when Sana comes out of a real burning house. Before she is able to fully exit the house, she falls due to her fractured leg and cannot get up. Soon, she exits the house before it burns down and finishes the scene. When they go back to Tokyo, Sana stays at the hospital for a few months to let her leg heal. Then she goes back to school. Things seem to be just as normal until Hayama starts calling Sana "Sana" instead of "Kurata", and she finds out that all her friends believed the tabloids about her and Naozumi dating. After that, Naozumi is interviewed on TV and reveals that Sana is in love with the one who saw her off the day they left for location. "An Egg Full of Thorns": A story about Akito when he was young.
7	October 1997	978-4-08-856042-7	May 6, 2003	978-1-59182-183-0
Chapters 31–35
Sana and Hayama reveal their feelings for each other, but Fuka overhears them. Sana says her feelings for Hayama are in the past, so that Fuka is not hurt. Sana takes as many job offers she can because she wants to concentrate on her acting career so that she can keep her mind off of Hayama and Fuka. While Sana is becoming more popular, Hayama is straying back to his old ways and having violent problems with his science teacher, Sengoku-sensei. One day after school, Hayama, Fuka, Tsuyoshi, and Aya go to the arcade to hang out. Hayama gets in a fight with two high schoolers, surprising Fuka and earning himself a suspension. Tsuyoshi tells Sana the news, and that night Sana happens to see Hayama jogging. His eyes are dark like in the past, but Sana makes him feel better. Sana returns to school and declares a friendly war with Fuka. Hayama is unintentionally horrible to a boy named Komori at school, who thought that Hayama was his only friend. A woman comes to school claiming that her son Komori is going to commit suicide because of Hayama. Thus, Hayama leaves to find Komori. Before he gets on the train to leave, he tells Sana that he still loves her.
8	March 1998	978-4-08-856068-7	July 15, 2003	978-1-59182-184-7
Chapters 36–40
Komori has run away from school, and says that he will commit suicide. Hayama goes after him to convince him otherwise. Komori stabs him in the arm, but then breaks down and is willing to return with Hayama. When they get back, Hayama has to be rushed to the hospital because he's suffered massive blood loss. In a near-death experience, his mother keeps him from moving on and makes him go back to life. He regains consciousness and stays at the hospital, but his hand is paralyzed by nerve damage. While he is at the hospital, Fuka breaks up with him because she realizes that he needs Sana. Komori's mother gets counseling to help her become a better parent and understand her son. Sana finds out Hayama and Fuka have broken up, but does not get together with Hayama yet. Meanwhile, when Hayama gets released from the hospital, he has much trouble managing with only his right hand. Sana plans another Christmas Eve party for this year. "Oponchi Monkeys": Miho describes a game that some of her friends play in the pool, and whoever loses gets punished. One of her friends loses and is punished by wearing a monkey suit the rest of the day.
9	August 1998	978-4-08-856094-6	September 16, 2003	978-1-59182-185-4
Chapters 41–46
Hayama and Sana are very close now, and it seems like they will be inseparable. That is, until Hayama's father suddenly tells him that they're moving to America. (Later, the reader finds out that he did this so Hayama could have a special surgery that could return movement to his arm.) Sana goes into a shock, and her face becomes emotionless like a mask. She is completely unaware of this, thinking her expressions are normal. Her mother remembers that she has gone through this before and inexplicably recovered, and hopes the same will happen. Akito is torn between leaving Sana and going with his family. Her mother asks Akito to not confront her about her illness, because she is afraid Sana will break under the strain. Sana is 14 years old at the time.
10	January 1999	978-4-08-856119-6	November 11, 2003	978-1-59182-186-1
Chapters 47–51
Sana continues to have a masklike face, her emotions begin running out of control, and she grows weak from being unable to keep food down. She briefly forgets who Akito is and decides to be with Naozumi instead, but Naozumi refuses to take advantage of the situation. Sana decides to "elope" with Akito. They escape and have fun at a theme park, but Sana's face remains masklike and she passes out when they go to stay at a hotel. When she wakes up, she sees the pictures they took and realizes for the first time that something is wrong with her expressions. Akito breaks down because he cannot handle Sana's illness any longer. He says that he's the one who will fall apart when he leaves her behind. Sana's maternal feelings for him resurface and they cry together. The next morning, Sana seems much more normal, and her face begins to show traces of emotion. They return, and she talks through it with a counselor as days pass. She decides it's better that she and Akito should be apart for a while so she can find herself. When everyone sees the Hayamas off at the airport, she yells "I'm going to stay a virgin so you'd better not cheat on me!" to comic reactions from everyone. Two years pass, during which Sana (and then Fuuka) work on a Frasier-esque radio talk show where kids call in with problems. Akito goes through rehabilitation in America, and they live their own lives but stay in touch. Finally, Akito returns to Japan to enroll in high school, and at last they're together - but he still keeps making her mad enough to pull out her hammer and whack him. As Fuuka says, "That's just their style." Sana is 16 years old.

==== Deep Clear (2010) ====
The crossover story, Deep Clear, was published in 2010, and takes place ten years after the end of Kodocha. Shuri, the heroine of Honey Bitter, is hired by Rei to spy on Akito because he had separated from Sana earlier. At this point, Sana and Akito are married and expecting a child. As she follows Akito, Shuri becomes good friends with Sana. She eventually discovers that the reason Akito separated from Sana is because he is afraid that she will die giving birth. When Sana gives birth, Shuri convinces Akito to face his fears by going to the hospital and seeing Sana and the baby. Sana gives birth to a daughter whom she names Sari. After their daughter's birth, Sana and Akito reconcile and begin raising their daughter together.

==== Days Without Anything (2015) ====
A special one-shot was published in the September 2015 issue of Ribon in order to celebrate the magazine's 60th anniversary. The story takes place between February and March of Volume 4 of Kodocha, after Misako's first essay has been published but before Sana begins middle school. Gonta, one of Sana's dogs, narrates his daily life in the Kurata household leading up to Sana's twelfth birthday, during which he and the other dogs destroy a gift Akito meant to give to her as they mistrust his intentions. Shimura catches them in the act and informs Sana, leading her to find Akito and thank him for remembering her birthday regardless; she also assures him that she's going to Jinbou Middle School with the rest of their friends, to Akito's secret relief. At home, Sana chastises her dogs and asks Gonta to be a little kinder to Akito, as he is one of her precious friends. Gonta reluctantly agrees, because although he is still wary of Akito, he trusts Sana and wants to protect her happiness.

==== Hot Pepper Beauty (2025) ====
In March 2025, the beauty salon aggregate platform Hot Pepper Beauty commissioned an 8-page Kodocha promotional comic. It was not serialized in Ribon, but was instead published to Hot Pepper Beauty's Twitter and Instagram accounts.

The story takes place during Sana's first year of high school. Sana has just been cast as the female lead in a film (produced by Ono Mikio, who directed Water Palace in the main series). As her first major role since the events of Kodocha, Sana is nervous and only becomes more so when Mikio claims she's lacking something.

After discussing it with friends Aya and Fuka, Sana decides to change things up with a haircut, and books an appointment through the Hot Pepper Beauty website. Pleased with the result, she regains her confidence and resolves to work hard on the movie. As she is leaving, Sana runs into her now-boyfriend Akito, and then leaves with her manager Rei for work. Akito enters the same salon for a trim.

=== Anime ===
An original video animation was produced in 1995 to mark the 40th anniversary of Ribon.

An anime adaption was later produced by TV Tokyo and NAS and animated by Studio Gallop, consisting of 102 TV episodes, airing on TV Tokyo and its affiliates from April 5, 1996, to March 27, 1998. The opening theme songs are "7 O'Clock News" by Tokio (episodes 1-44) and "Ultra Relax" by Tomoe Shinohara (episodes 45–102); the ending theme songs are "Panic" by Still Small Voice (episodes 1-39), "Daijo-bu" by Tomoko Hikita (episodes 40–74), and "Pinch (Love Me Deeper)" by Rina Chinen (episodes 75–102). The first 51 episodes covers the elementary school story arc, while the remaining 51 episodes cover the middle school story arc.

The series was first licensed by Funimation from NAS, releasing the first 51 episodes on DVD. The series was partially broadcast on American TV in a syndicated Funimation Channel programming block airing on Colours TV and Los Angeles KSCI-DT channel 18.3. The first opening song, "7 O'Clock News", was replaced with "Ultra Relax" due to licensing issues via Johnny & Associates.

Discotek Media announced that they had re-acquired the North American rights from ADK Emotions to the series during a live Twitch panel from December 14, 2020, mentioning that 7 O'Clock News would be restored on the upcoming SD Blu-ray release of the first arc in November 2021 as rights issues had been resolved following the death of Johnny Kitagawa. The second arc was released in 2022 as a sub-only release.

=== Stage Production ===
A stage play adaptation of Kodocha was announced in the March 2015 issue of Shueisha's Ribon magazine, to be written and directed by Akitaro Daichi, the director of the Kodocha television anime. Sana was portrayed by both Kokoro Okuda and Rio Ogura, and Akito by Yuga Aizawa and Rihito Itagaki. Additional cast members included Sogo Ito as Tsuyoshi Oki, Satsuki Usui and Mio Yoshimura as Natsumi Hayama, and Hiyori Arima, Masahiro Ezaki, Mari Kazama, Wakana Kawai, Keita Takahashi, Miu Takahashi, Mitsuki Nishida, Mirai, and Yumeka Yoshiwara as classmates.

The play opened August 20, 2015, via Nelke Planning in Tokyo, and ran for ten days until the 30th.

== Reception ==
Kodocha won the Kodansha Manga Award for best shōjo manga in 1998. Jason Thompson found the manga "joyfully weird ... with good lines and funny details", calling the art quaint. Holly Kolodziejczak from Animefringe praised the series for its multiple elements such as mystery and romance that form a strong comedy. Additionally, like Thompson, he found the art quality despite the time its age. Dillon Font from the same site called it "very solid part of a manga collection." The reviewer compared it with the anime adaptation "sorely missing the insane quirkiness that Daichi's [the anime's director] direction injected into the anime series" which might leave the manga "dull." Allen Divers from Anime News Network recommended it to readers commenting it is "a solid story about a young girl coming of age that remains entertaining the entire way".

The anime adaptation also received the praise with THEM Anime Reviews' Carlos Ross who claimed "the frenzied comedy is the selling point of this anime, and sell it does". Zac Bertschy from Anime News Network praised the characters as likables and also liked the animation and music. Reviewing the series' 10th DVD, Carl Kimlinger from the same website as Bertschy said that while "neither the show nor Sana has slowed a whit in forty episodes" the material not as appealing as previous episodes.
