= List of Metaphor: ReFantazio characters =

Cover art of Metaphor: ReFantazio, depicting various characters

Metaphor: ReFantazio is a 2024 role-playing video game by Atlus, set in a fictional fantasy world. It centers on a protagonist who sets out on a quest to save a prince from a curse by defeating an aspirant for the throne called Louis Guiabern, accompanied by several allies from different tribes. His allies include the fairy Gallica, the clemar Strohl, the roussainte Hulkenberg, the ishika Neuras, the eugief Heismay, the nidia Junah, the mustari Eupha, and the paripus Basilio. He also receives assistance in the development of powers called Archetypes from an amnesiac named More, and can form relationships with these characters as well as others. In addition to these tribes, there are creatures such as humans who roam the land, their designs inspired by the imagery found in the work of Hieronymus Bosch. Each person belongs to a different tribe, including the elda, clemar, roussainte, rhoag, ishika, mustari, nidia, paripus, and eugief.

The story and characters were directed and created by Katsura Hashino, and the characters and Archetypes were mostly designed by Shigenori Soejima, both having previously worked on the Persona series. Hashino aspired to make a fantasy story, reading various fantasy stories to prepare himself, but wanted to ensure that his characters and world were not seen as copies of anything. Metaphor's cast has been generally well received, with multiple critics enjoying how the characters of different tribes were able to demonstrate different aspects of their society. The English localization was also praised, particularly in its authenticity to different regions of the United Kingdom. Criticism of the characters included Stephanie Liu of Siliconera suggesting that its racial allegory felt "forced," and critics wishing that there was more voice acting.

== Concept and creation ==
Metaphor takes place in a fantasy setting called the United Kingdom of Euchronia, where people fight with a magical power called magla. This world exists in contrast to a fantasy novel that mirrors it, and according to director Katsura Hashino, the team worked to create an "underlying feeling of connection between the [fantasy and modern] worlds." When designing the fantasy world of Metaphor, the game's creator, Katsura Hashino, stated that he was moved while researching fantasy stories (such as The Lord of the Rings) by a piece that read "Fantasy does more than immerse us in empty worlds of fiction. They exist because there's something about our world we want to change, and they help us reimagine something new." He added that this helped informed multiple aspect's of the game's development, including its characters.

The game was originally intended to be more akin to The Lord of the Rings, featuring dwarves, elves, and other races. Artist Shigenori Soejima created designs for this version of the game's characters, but according to Hashino, they felt too ordinary. They discussed how they could make them more interesting, the characters became more interesting to them. When designing the characters, Hashino stated that he was careful to not imitate the works he read, as it may be seen as a copy. Hashino also stated that anxiety was a central focus of the game, and that a fantasy setting helped make these anxieties less specific than in a modern setting. Hashino also aspired to avoid having romance elements like in the Persona series, believing it would be out of place in a fantasy story compared to Persona, which involved teenagers. The characters are around teenage age, but face more difficult issues than typical teenagers according to Hashino.

Each character in Metaphor belongs to one of multiple fictional tribes, including elda, paripus, roussainte, rhoag, clemar, eugief, nidia, mustari, and ishika, each having varying levels of similarity to real-life humans. These tribes each have different physical features, and some have higher positions in society than others. Elda, mustari, and paripus are considered second-class citizens in the kingdom, while clemar and roussainte are considered superior. Most of these races have human-like appearances, with the exception of the eugief, who are shorter and have animal-like faces and other animal features. Paripus, clemar, and ishika also have animal-like features (animal ears, horns, and wings respectively), except with human proportions. Roussainte are noted for their height and long ears, while rhoag are noted for markings on their skin. Nidia have larger pupils and a true form that they conceal, while mustari have a third eye and often conceal their face with a helmet as part of their customs. Elda have no dissimilarities with humans. When designing the different tribes, Hashino stated that he based them on Japanese personality traits; one is based on older Japanese people who "try to push their values on young people and make them follow in their tracks," while another is based on people who "have trouble speaking their mind and putting their emotions and their thoughts out there."

Aside from these tribes, the world is populated by other creatures, including immortal beings called fairies, monsters called humans, and dragons. The humans were inspired by the designs from "The Garden of Earthly Delights", a work by artist Hieronymus Bosch. The English localization gave certain characters and races different accents depending on their tribe; residents of the town Martira have Scottish accents, while residents of Virga Island have a Welsh accent.

Certain characters are able to utilize powerful magic called "Archetype," involving the summoning and utilization of heroic archetypes, such as healers, warriors, mages, and knights. Archetypes are largely utilized by the protagonist and his allies. The main characters fit certain archetypes as well. These Archetypes each have unique designs, most designed by Soejima while some were designed by Yuji Himukai of Etrian Odyssey fame.

== Main characters ==
The main characters share the goal of defeating the antagonist Louis Guiabern and saving the prince from a curse, with most of them able to participate in combat.

=== Protagonist ===
Voiced by: Natsuki Hanae (Japanese); Caleb Yen (English)

The protagonist is a young eldan boy who can be named by the player (though his canon name is Will), and is called Captain by his allies. He is the first to awaken to an Archetype, and regularly cooperates with an amnesiac librarian named More. He is a close friend to a cursed prince, and embarks on a mission to cure him of this curse, which is believed to be caused by a noble named Louis Guiabern. He recruits Strohl, Hulkenberg, Heismay, Junah, Eupha, and Basilio along his journey. He is also accompanied by a fairy named Gallica, who provides support in battle and as a companion. With the cooperation of his allies, he seeks to take the throne to defeat Louis.

After nearly killing Louis, the protagonist is transformed into a human by Louis, who claims that humans are the true form of eldans. This causes his popularity to plummet, while Louis has the prince killed after his location is discovered. It is eventually discovered that the protagonist and the prince are one and the same, the protagonist having been created from the prince's desire to travel the world despite his limitations. Upon this discovery, the prince's soul merges with the protagonist, causing them to become one entity. The protagonist eventually regains his popularity and defeats Louis.

When designing the protagonist, Soejima stated that he wanted to depict a new kind of protagonist that they could not do in past games due to the modern setting. He wanted the character to be androgynous and heroic looking who "looks like they're about to change the world." They aspired to make him a character that would be easy for players to resonate with.

=== Leon Strohl da Haliaetus ===
Voiced by: Kensho Ono (Japanese); Stewart Clarke (English)

Strohl is the first party member to join the protagonist, joining him in combat before awakening to the Warrior Archetype after nearly being killed by a human. He is a clemar noble seeking revenge against Louis Guiabern for the destruction of his village. Aided by the protagonist, the two work to obtain the inheritance of his late parents, growing to understand what it means to be a noble along the way. He eventually finds his inheritance, using it to help the survivors of the village attack in getting housing.

=== Arvid Grius ===
Voiced by: Tetsu Inada (Japanese); Gordon Cooper (English)

Arvid Grius is a member of the rhoag tribe and an eventual companion to the protagonist. As part of the protagonist's plan, he was meant to meet up with the protagonist to save the prince. Grius awakens to the ability to use an Archetype some time later. He is married to an innkeeper named Fabienne, and is the father to Maria, a young girl. He is killed during the initial attempt to assassinate Louis, who is protected by the King's magic, and his corpse reanimated to fight the protagonist by Zorba. His soul is allowed to rest after he is defeated.

=== Eiselin Burchelli Meijal Hulkenberg ===
Voiced by: Saori Hayami (Japanese); Kristin Atherton (English)

Hulkenberg is a member of the roussainte tribe and former Kingsguard who judges herself harshly for the prince falling victim to the curse, her main focus being to break said curse upon learning of his survival. She manages to channel the Knight Archetype after joining the protagonist. She eventually learns the truth that the protagonist is a form created by the prince, and upon the prince's soul entering the protagonist's body, treats him with reverence. She originally beat out another knight to become the leader of the Kingsguard, who resents her for abandoning her position. Learning that he had become cruel and oppressive in his position, she challenges and defeats him, having him arrested for his crimes.

=== Heismay Noctule ===
Voiced by: Akio Otsuka (Japanese); Philippe Spall (English)

Heismay is a former member of a covert group called the Shadowguard and a eugief. He is first met while the protagonist is hunting a bounty placed on him for the disappearance of children in a village, only to discover that he is being framed by a member of the Sanctist Church named Joanna, the actual culprit. Before the events of the game, his son was killed, causing him intense grief. He joins him in stopping these crimes, and awakens to the Thief Archetype in the process. He expresses his sympathy for Joanna, who did this after her baby was killed for being mixed-race, driven mad by her loss. The protagonist assists him in finding an appropriate burial place for his son's bones, attempting to have him buried at his home village, only for the villagers to steal the bones and hide them away to keep him from leaving him there. Heismay eventually decides that he does not want to bury him, choosing to turn his bones into a necklace so they can be together.

=== Juani Cygnus ===
Voiced by: Yoshino Nanjo (Japanese); Emma Ballantine (English)

Juani "Junah" Cygnus is a nidia who is first seen singing as part of an election event, and is revealed to be a member of Louis' entourage. She is later seen sneaking around Louis' gauntlet runner, a large vehicle, and is revealed to have been working with Grius to break the prince's curse. She joins the protagonist after discovering their shared goal, awakening to the Archetype of the Masked Dancer. She has an adoptive sister named Rella, who is a figure in the Sanctist Church. Rella is eventually revealed to be responsible for the prince's curse, having been made to do so under duress as a child by Forden in order to protect Junah from him. Junah eventually manages to defeat Rella, who accepts her death gracefully due to her belief that the protagonist will be a better king than Louis.

The protagonist assists her in getting prepared for a singing performance, only for a jealous competitor to plot to ruin her for taking her spot. The woman eventually backs down, but becomes unable to speak due to being hurt by someone who was trying to hurt Junah. Junah eventually reveals that all nidia have child-like forms, using magic to change their form. She eventually manages to help the woman regain her voice, and helps her get a singing job.

=== Euphausia Etoreika ===
Voiced by: Misato Fukuen (Japanese); Emily Burnett (English)

Euphausia "Eupha" Etoreika is the mustari priestess of the Dragon God for Virga Island and sister to Edeni, a man competing with the protagonist for the royal throne. She is meant to be sacrificed to appease their dragon god, only for the protagonist and her brother to convince her that she need not die in order to fulfill their scripture. She awakens to the Summoner Archetype and joins the party in their quest to defeat Louis. This Archetype can eventually become the Devil Summoner, which is able to summon demons from the Megaten franchise, such as Jack Frost. With the assistance of the protagonist, she learns more about the Sanctist Church, and discovers that a church leader is attempting to use prayer to save people from their ailments. He eventually comes to attempt to sacrifice them, only for Eupha to defeat him, believing he had been corrupted by the presence of magla into doing this. She eventually reveals to the protagonist that she has feelings for him.

=== Basilio Lupus Magnus ===
Voiced by: Yoshimasa Hosoya (Japanese); Matt Whitchurch (English)

Basilio is a member of the paripus tribe and an adherent to Louis' rise to the throne due to his and his brother, Fidelio's, belief that he would help the paripus in ways the current system does not. He and Fidelio were the subject of experimentation, along with other paripus. After the two accompany the protagonist and his allies to Virga Island to get a spear for Louis, they are eventually convinced by Louis' cruelty to stand against him. This causes Fidelio's death, and Basilio awakens to the Berserker Archetype, joining the protagonist in his cause.

During Basilio's Follower quest, he reunites with another paripus, Vinca, who went through the experiments with Basilio and Fidelio. Basilio eventually discovers that Vinca has been killing rich and powerful people, and he and the protagonist are forced to kill him after he begins to lose his mind.

=== Gallica ===
Voiced by: Sumire Morohoshi (Japanese); Alejandra Reynoso (English)

Gallica is a fairy who accompanies the protagonist from the beginning of his quest to save the prince. She provides support to him both in and out of battle, and creates diegetic music that plays for the protagonist. It is later revealed that she was given false memories as part of the plan to send the protagonist out into the world.

When designing Gallica, Soejima described her as "classically fantastical in many ways," but noted that they aimed to give her a more modern aesthetic. Finalizing Gallica's appearance helped them determine how they should design other characters, giving them creative momentum.

=== Neueirus Corax ===
Voiced by: Kazuhiko Inoue (Japanese); David Monteith (English)

Neueirus "Neuras" Corax is an ishika engineer who participated in the creation of a gauntlet runner, a land-based walking vehicle, for the prince before his curse. He joins the protagonist after being recruited by Hulkenberg, allowing them to use the previously unused gauntlet runner. Throughout the game, he aims to improve the gauntlet runner, eventually succeeding in turning it into a flying vehicle. The protagonist assists him in the pursuit of ancient artifacts, only to realize that these artifacts were components of a dangerous weapon, which he ultimately destroys to prevent its use.

== Antagonists ==
=== Louis Guiabern ===
Voiced by: Yuichi Nakamura (Japanese); Joseph Tweedale (English)

Louis is a man responsible for assassinating the king of the kingdom, whom the protagonist pursues in order to break the curse placed on the prince. He attempts to become king himself, but is prevented by the king's magic, requiring that whomever becomes king attains majority support from the public. He works with various people from different tribes, using the threat of humans to demonstrate the need for his rule. He is among the most popular candidates for the entire game, competing with Forden and eventually the protagonist. The protagonist joins him under false pretenses, and he is nearly killed by the protagonist using a weapon that could ignore the king's magic, though is saved by his minion Zorba before assassinating Forden with that same weapon.

It is revealed that he was not the person responsible for the curse on the prince, and he succeeds in turning much of the populace against the protagonist by turning him into a monstrous human and claiming that elda were humans. While he displays as clemar, Louis eventually reveals to the king's spirit that he is actually an elda like the protagonist. He lays claim to the throne due to no one being able to compete with him, until the protagonist manages to ascend back to number two and kill him.

=== Aestivum Forden ===
Voiced by: Mitsuru Miyamoto (Japanese); Jamie Newall (English)

Forden is a rhoag and the leader of the Sanctist Church, and for much of the game, the most strongly supported figure to assume the role of king. He aspires to defeat Louis in order to avoid Louis becoming more popular than him. He participates in various schemes, and through Louis' machinations, is eventually killed, causing Louis to become number one. It is later revealed that Forden was responsible for the curse on the prince in order to prevent him from taking the throne, and was also noted for having taken advantage of the king's despair in order to enact the church's designs.

=== Cirsium Zorba ===
Voiced by: Tomokazu Sugita (Japanese); Adam Rhys Dee (English)

Zorba is a mustari and clemar mix who is loyal to Louis and his goals. He initially assists in an attack by Louis on the church, before being defeated by the protagonist. He later returns, having faked his death, posing as part of the church in order to help Louis fake his death as well. He later has his body warped, remaining loyal to Louis until his death.

=== Humans ===
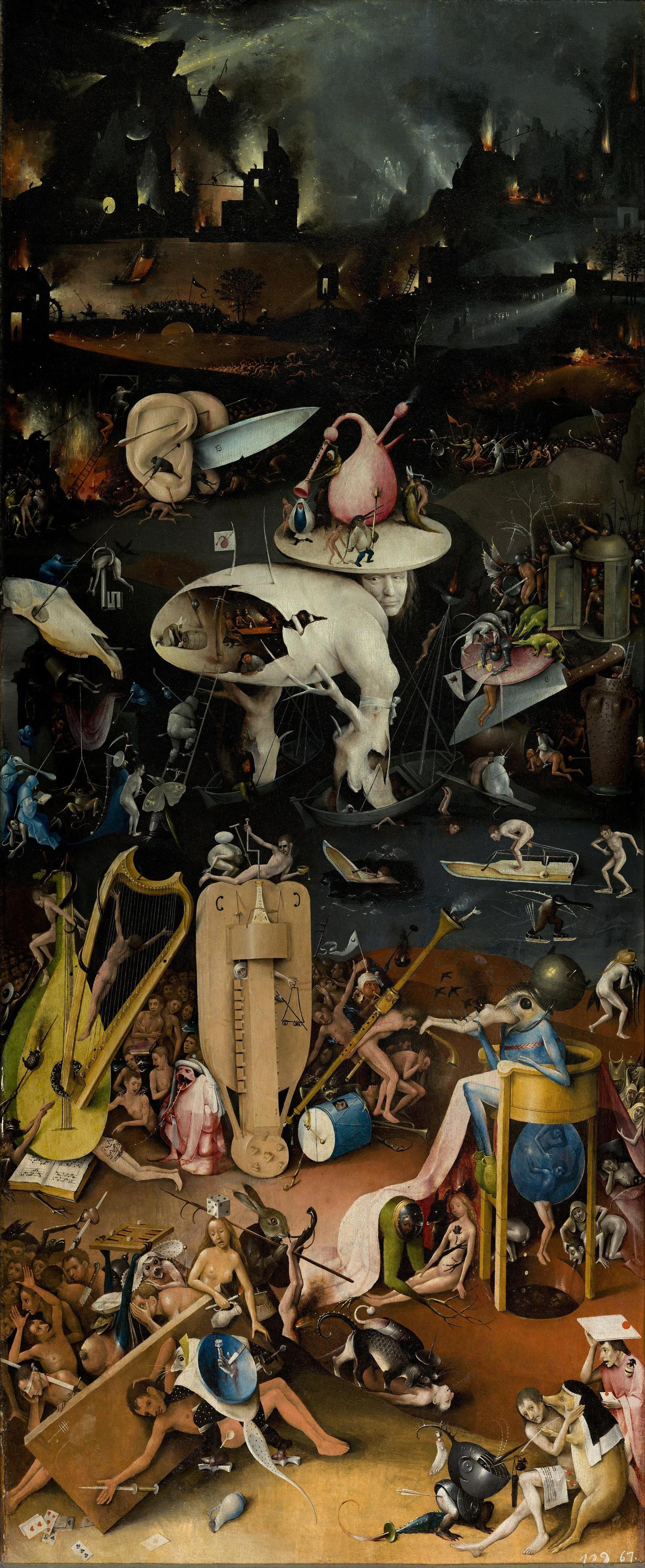
The humans were inspired by the art of Hieronymus Bosch

The humans are a type of being that pervade the surrounding lands, presenting a threat to the populace. They have monstrous appearances and vary in size, with some being larger than a building. Louis campaigns on the human threat in order to gain popularity, noted for his human-slaying skills. It is eventually revealed that not only do humans originate from a society before theirs where they were also called humans, but all tribes are descended from this old society as well.

Polygon writer Maddy Myers discussed how bizarre the design of humans look, particularly the egg boss, finding them both "terrifying" and "impressive." She remarked how fun it was to find the similarities between humans in Metaphor and the designs by Hieronymus Bosch.

== Followers ==
More
Voiced by: Takehito Koyasu (Japanese); Greg Chun (English)

More is an amnesiac clemar who is trapped in a space called Akademia, a room with many books that he was made to stay there by the late king. He helps assist the protagonist in his quest, and the protagonist helps assist More in researching Archetypes. He regains his memory bit by bit with each research the protagonist successfully completes, attempting to realize who he is and why he became trapped. He eventually becomes aware of his identity, and saves the protagonist from a fatal injury. He reveals that, like the protagonist, he was a creation, being the king when he was younger and thus the protagonist's father. He fails to convince the protagonist to come with him to the world found in the novel he wrote, and after being defeated, professes his faith in the protagonist's vision.

Maria Alces
Voiced by: Yui Ishikawa (Japanese); Scarlet Grace (English)

Maria is a young girl and the daughter to Grius, being half rhoag and ishika. She is cared for by a woman named Fabienne, who was in a common-law marriage with Grius, and spends much of the game grieving over Grius' death. Fabienne and the protagonist, as well as other members of the protagonist's group, work to help her deal with her grief and see more of the world through Neuras' art. Maria also aspires to help people, including the downtrodden around Fabienne's inn.

Brigitta Lycaon
Voiced by: Yoko Hikasa (Japanese); Lynsey Murrell (English)

Brigitta is a rhoag shop owner who sells magic items called igniters. She initially has the protagonist do jobs for her, including looking after her dog. She eventually reveals that she grew up poor and aspired to never be vulnerable again. During her Follower quest, she nearly destroys a village as revenge for the apparent death of her dog, but the protagonist helps her realize that they were not involved. She has a hatred for igniters, and by the end of her story, begins creating safe igniters as toys in order to make them less dangerous.

Catherina Grann
Voiced by: Fairouz Ai (Japanese); Holly-Marie Michael (English)

Catherina is a paripus bounty hunter who aspires to become the leader of the kingdom in order to strike back against the rich and powerful in society. She initially campaigns on killing the rich, but becomes disillusioned by fellow paripus who she believes are going too far in their violence. Over time, she works to find a more amiable method of improving things for paripus, believing that a life of taking is not a good life.

Alonzo Crotalus
Voiced by: Atsushi Tamaru (Japanese); Andrew Whelldon-Dennis (English)

Alonzo is a nidia who assists the protagonist in retrieving the knife owned by Grius. After developing a kinship with the protagonist and seeing the consequences of his deception and swindling when his mother is killed, he fakes his death and has the protagonist distribute his money to his village in order to make the protagonist look better in their eyes.

Elphas Bardon
Voiced by: Kenji Hamada (Japanese); Angus King (English)

Bardon is a roussainte who works as a soldier in the Sanctist Church under Lady Joanna in Martira until she is arrested for grave crimes against its citizenry. Following her execution, he is a popular choice to succeed her, but is reluctant to accept. He eventually begins to crack down on Martira by increasing security, causing him to become less popular. He eventually earns the people's trust by assisting in killing a dangerous human that threatened Martira.

== Reception ==
PCGamesN writer Aaron Down found the characters "instantly likable," appreciating that each character in the English dub was given a voice representing a different part of the United Kingdom and praising the vocal performance. He also praised the team for depicting the main cast experiencing "age-old prejudices and uneasy alliances," feeling like it helped them get the most out of "characters built on well-trodden tropes." He felt that, despite the high quality of the gameplay of Metaphor, the story and characters will keep players invested. PCGamer writer Lewis Parker found the struggles that the cast goes through believable despite them not being humans themselves, expressing that he enjoyed the writing so much that it made him sad when the game finished. He also appreciated the English localization making characters speak with British dialects and slang, feeling that it was done authentically. RPGFan writer Zek Lu appreciated the character writing's impact on the game's narrative and atmosphere, enjoying how both playable and non-playable characters helped inform him of various aspects of the game's world. He also enjoyed the different Follower quests, stating that all of them were well-written, though feeling that one character did not get enough development and another had a less enjoyable conclusion to their story. Shack News writer Donovan Erskine praised the main characters, and felt that the cast, including non-playable characters, were the "driving force" of the game. He spoke of the cast making a "profound impact" on him, particularly Gallica.

RPGSite writer Josh Torres noted that initial reception to the announcement that players would not be able to romance characters had a mixed reception, but to him, this worked because he felt it would be strange to be able to romance characters who are going through intense grief would feel wrong. Commenting on the handling of Followers, Torres felt similarly about them as he did Social Links in Persona; namely, that he found it disappointing that character interactions were largely between the player and his Followers, but not between other Followers. He was also critical of the Follower quests for having limited voice acting, comparing it to Persona 3 Reload, where Social Links are all voice acted. GameSpot writer Jessica Cogswell was initially skeptical of the cast after playing the demo; despite enjoying Strohl in particular, she felt that he and Grius felt "very similar" to fantasy archetypes. Nonetheless, she found the voice acting and writing "strong." In her review, she found all of the main characters compelling, particularly Strohl, Hulkenberg, and Heismay, as well as its antagonist Louis. She also appreciated how some characters are given characterization early on in the game before becoming main characters. Cogswell echoed Torres' criticism regarding voice acting, wishing there was more during Follower quests.

Siliconera writer Stephanie Liu, in her review of Metaphor, stated that the characters were fun, adding that despite the racial conflicts in the game, she felt that the tribes being so similar physically besides the eugief made the conflict feel "forced." She compared it to the film Zootopia, where she argued that the racism metaphor did not work due to prey animals having valid reasons to fear predators, whereas there is no valid reason to fear people based on immutable traits. She felt that Japanese people tend to have less exposure to racial prejudice due to low passport ownership, arguing that Japanese depictions of racism can fall flat as a result. She felt that this would resonate better with a Japanese audience, while people in Western regions may find it "horribly naive," especially in the social climate of 2024. She found the story more compelling when it focused on political corruption, greed, and ignorance. In hindsight, Liu felt that the story and characters did not resonate with her as well, feelings some characters were rushed and/or undeveloped. On the subject of racial allegory, she felt like Zootopia handled it better than Metaphor. She noted how many minor characters interacted with the protagonist, starting off antagonistic due to him being elda, was handled poorly, believing that they stop being racist too easily and making the racial conflict lack impact. She also argued that the game did not provide explanation for why people hate certain races, noting how one can point to real-world stereotypes that they cannot in Metaphor.
