= Rokuhōdō Yotsuiro Biyori =

Japanese manga and anime series

- First volume cover

鹿楓堂よついろ日和
- Genre: Cooking, iyashikei
- Manga
- Written by: Yū Shimizu
- Published by: Shinchosha
- Magazine: Go Go Bunch (2013–2018); Monthly Comic Bunch (2018–2024); Comic Bunch Kai (2024–present)
- Original run: October 9, 2013 – present
- Volumes: 23
- Anime television series
- Directed by: Tomomi Kamiya
- Written by: Deko Akao
- Music by: Takeshi Watanabe
- Studio: Zexcs
- Original network: AT-X, Tokyo MX, KBS Kyoto
- Original run: April 10, 2018 – June 26, 2018
- Episodes: 12
- Television drama
- Directed by: Yuki Saito; Keisuke Shibata; Eriko Sato
- Produced by: Yumiko Miwa (general producer); Sari Kijima; Shūhei Toshi; Yasuyuki Niino; Risa Hikita
- Written by: Yōko Izumisawa
- Original network: TV Asahi
- Original run: January 15, 2022 – March 19, 2022
- Episodes: 10
- icon

Rokuhōdō Yotsuiro Biyori (鹿楓堂よついろ日和) is a Japanese manga series by Yū Shimizu. It has been serialized in Shinchosha's seinen manga magazine Go Go Bunch since October 2013 and has been collected in twenty-three tankōbon volumes as of August 2026. An anime television series adaptation by Zexcs aired from April to June 2018. A live-action drama adaptation premiered in January 2022 on TV Asahi's Oshidora Saturday block.

== Plot ==
Four young men run a tea house/café called Rokuhōdō together. They often help out customers with their worries.

== Characters ==
=== Main characters ===
Kyousui "Sui" Tougoku (東極京水(スイ))
Voiced by: Junichi Suwabe
Portrayed by: Nozomu Kotaki
Shop owner and manager of Rokuhōdō. His first name is actually Kyousui, but he is fondly called Sui by everyone. He quit his office job to reopen the tea house he inherited from his grandfather. He learnt the art of tea making from his grandfather and is now a tea expert. His tea is known to have a relaxing attribute and is easy to drink too. Though he seems pretty clueless at times, he is pretty sharp and level headed at others. Although his tea is excellent, he totally sucks at cooking, and as such, his cooking is feared by everyone. He is a big fan of cats, and has a pet cat named Kinako at home, which was a stray he picked up. He is not really on speaking terms with his twin brother, whom he wants to make up with.
Tokitaka Nagae (永江時高)
Voiced by: Yuichi Nakamura
Portrayed by: Shōno Hayama
With a calm disposition and a gentle nature, Tokitaka is the main chef at Rokuhōdō. He was Sui's middle school classmate and a popular potter from a young age. After helping Sui with some tableware, he decides to join Sui in re-opening Rokuhōdō and thus becomes one of the first employees. He has a gentle disposition and gives pottery lessons to the retired elderly, who are also regulars at the cafe. He also makes the café's tableware and decides on the main menu.
Gregorio "Gure" Valentino (ぐれ)
Voiced by: Daisuke Ono
Portrayed by: Daichi Saeki
He is the Barista at Rokuhōdō. He grew up and learned his trade in Italy. He was an 'angry young man' as a teenager, but after he was taken in by a Barista there, he learnt the art from him which also changed his character. This is also the reason he has a lever operated espresso machine at Rokuhōdō. He returned to Japan since it was his father's country. Although his coffee is extremely delicious, he is totally clueless about his iffy latte art. He is cheerful and outgoing. He is also a member of the local duck boating club. He often has friendly arguments with Tsubaki.
Tsubaki Nakao (中尾椿)
Voiced by: Daiki Yamashita
Portrayed by: Ryūsei Ōnishi
Rokuhōdō's Pâtissier. Although a terrific Pâtissier, he is an introvert, and tends to get nervous from people's eyes . Though he is completely at home with the others at Rokuhōdō, he is still shy when he gets complimented. He has an extreme sweet tooth, and goes around to other cafes to have their sweets and restaurants when they have sweets buffets. He is in charge of the dessert menu and also comes up with some original menus. He also guided Isago to enjoy eating sweets at cafes, and is referred to as 'Master' by him. He is also praised by Tsunozaki, who tells Sui that he acquired a great talent (while referring to Tsubaki). He is usually seen teasing Gure.
Kinako (キナコ)
Voiced by: Kōhei Amasaki
Sui's pet cat, but adored by all the members of Rokuhōdō and the customers of Rokuhōdō too. Kinako has a very calm and quiet personality and is often seen in front of the cafe, sunbathing.

=== Other characters ===
Yakyō Tougoku (東極八京)
Voiced by: Tomoaki Maeno
Portrayed by: Ryusei Fuji
Sui's older brother. Stoic and silent in nature, he is the Vice-President of East Side Grand Hotel, which belongs to his father. Though he shares fond childhood memories of Rokuhōdō, where he spent time with Sui and his grandfather, he currently resists coming to Rokuhōdō, saying that "he doesn't belong there". His relationship with Sui seems to be a bit strained, though Sui wants to make up with him.
Eisuke Tsunozaki (門崎英介)
Voiced by: Kōsuke Toriumi
Portrayed by: Jin Shirasu
A chirpy, cunning character, Tsunozaki is a famous, top pâtissier, acknowledged for his skills, taste and originality. He works for the East Side Grand Hotel, though he also helps out in other pâtisseries at times. He is also Yakyō's friend. He was first introduced to the members of Rokuhōdō when he asks them to substitute another store in an event in a department store, without telling them his identity. But gives them trouble in the event, by calling in too many customers and the television, when they are not used to it. He later arrives at Rokuhōdō to know and understand more about Sui. Though he appears cunning and unbearable at times, he is a loyal friend, who wants to help Yakyō reconcile with Sui, and also gives out tips on making his desserts better to Tsubaki.
Takehiko Amagami
A proud, energetic old man and owner of the Amagamiya, a tea shop (selling tea leaves). He was a customer of the old Rokuhōdō and was encouraged by Sui's grandfather's tea to start business. In the present, he was having temper tantrums due to a customer cancelling their contract in favour of ready-made, bottled tea - this is the time Sui meets him first. He makes a bet with Sui to determine whether he wants to sell Rokuhōdō his tea, and later enters a contract with them. He loves the food and tea at Rokuhōdō, though never admits it, instead coming over for 'inspections'.
Sae Amagami
Wife of Takehiko Amagami. She has a calm demeanour as compared with her husband.
Kotsuru Amagami
Granddaughter of Takehiko Amagami. A school going child, her knowledge about tea has been tempered by her tea-loving grandfather, and she is a tea lover herself. Her knowledge regarding tea also seems to be high level, as she is able to tell the individual tea leaves from the tea mixture used at Rokuhōdō. She is also shy and timid child, but comes to Rokuhōdō to try to propose to them her grandfather's tea - though she never gets to it. She is also best friends with Gin Yonogura, who is her polar opposite in personality. She learns how to make matcha ice cream from Tsubaki to share with Gin. She also becomes a big fan of Rokuhōdō, often visiting the store with her grandfather.
Hirokazu Isago (砂金宏和)
A man with a sweet tooth who works for the magazine G! Moto. He wanted to start a new article in the magazine, listing fancy new cafes, but couldn't gather courage to actually visit said cafes, since they are usually the hangouts of women. He observes Tsubaki going to one such cafe fearlessly, and dubs him first a 'Hero'. He then visits Rokuhōdō, where after meeting Tsubaki, renames him 'Master' for showing him to actually relax in cafes. After this, he gains enough courage to start a new column named listing out cafes a single man can visit. He becomes a regular customer of Rokuhōdō.

== Media ==
=== Manga ===
Rokuhōdō Yotsuiro Biyori is written and illustrated by Yū Shimizu and published in Japan by Shinchosha. It began serialization in the bimonthly seinen magazine Go Go Bunch on October 9, 2013. The chapters have been collected in twenty-three tankōbon volumes as of August 2026.

=== Anime ===
An anime television series adaptation was announced in the 19th issue of Shinchosha's Go Go Bunch magazine. The series is directed by Tomomi Kamiya at Zexcs, with scripts written by Deko Akao and character designs by Kei Anjiki, and aired from April 10 to June 26, 2018. The opening theme is "Sakurairo Cliché" (桜色クリシェ, Sakurairo Kurishe), performed by former SKE48 member Aki Deguchi.

No.	Title
1	"Welcome to Rokuhōdō Cafe" "Kissa Shika Rokuhōdō e Yōkoso"(喫茶 鹿楓堂へようこそ)
2	"The Teahouse's Secrets" "Ochaya no Himitsu"(お茶屋の秘密)
3	"Sweets Trap Collection" "Suītsu Torappu Korekushon"(スイーツトラップコレクション)
4	"Tempura Bowl Survivor" "Tendon Sabaibā"(天丼サバイバー)
4	"An Incident, Meow" "Hapuningu Nyā"(ハプニングにゃー)
5	"Love for Lost Sheep" "Mayoeruko Hitsuji ni Ai no Te o"(迷える子羊に愛の手を)
6	"It Begins with Omurice" "Hajimari wa Omuraisu"(はじまりはオムライス)
7	"Vegetable Power" "Bejitaburu Pawā"(ベジタブルパワー)
7	"I Love Ice Cream" "I Ai Aisu"(I 愛 アイス)
8	"Espresso Espressivo" "Esupresso・Esupurosshīvo"(エスプレッソ・エスプレッシーヴォ)
9	"Clumsy Hero" "Bukiyō Hīrō"(不器用ヒーロー)
9	"Mont Blanc Boy" "Monburan Danshi"(モンブラン男子)
10	"She Doesn't Know Rokuhōdō Yet" "Kanojo wa Mada Shika Rokuhōdō o Shiranai"(彼女はまだ鹿楓堂を知らない)
10	"The Cafe's Napolitan" "Kissaten no Naporitan"(喫茶店のナポリタン)
11	"Life is a Hamburg" "Jinsei wa Hanbāgu"(人生はハンバーグ)
12	"Rokuhōdō Yotsuiro Biyori" (鹿楓堂 よついろ日和)
