= Shōnen Hollywood =

Japanese media franchise

- Poster of season 1

少年ハリウッド (Shōnen Hariuddo)
- Genre: Music
- Novel
- Written by: Ikuyo Hashiguchi
- Published by: Shogakukan
- Imprint: Shogakukan Bunko
- Published: July 2012
- Anime television series

Shōnen Hollywood -Holly Stage for 49-
- Directed by: Toshimasa Kuroyanagi
- Written by: Ikuyo Hashiguchi
- Music by: Tetsuji Hayashi
- Studio: Zexcs
- Licensed by: NA: Funimation
- Original network: AT-X, Tokyo MX, TV Saitama, CTC, tvk, KBS, Sun TV, TV Aichi, BS11
- English network: SEA: Animax Asia
- Original run: July 5, 2014 – September 27, 2014
- Episodes: 13
- Anime television series

Shōnen Hollywood -Holly Stage for 50-
- Directed by: Toshimasa Kuroyanagi
- Written by: Ikuyo Hashiguchi
- Music by: Tetsuji Hayashi
- Studio: Zexcs
- Licensed by: NA: Funimation
- Original network: AT-X, Tokyo MX, TV Saitama, CTC, tvk, KBS, Sun TV, TV Aichi, BS11
- English network: SEA: Animax Asia
- Original run: January 10, 2015 – April 4, 2015
- Episodes: 13

Shōnen Hollywood (少年ハリウッド, Shōnen Hariuddo) is a Japanese media franchise created by Ikuyo Hashiguchi. It consists of an idol project, a novel by Hashiguchi that was published by Shogakukan in 2012 and an anime television series by Zexcs that aired between July 5, 2014, and September 27, 2014. Funimation has licensed the series for streaming and home video release in North America. Crunchyroll simulcast the series for territories outside of North America since July 5, 2014. A second season aired between January 10, 2015, and April 4, 2015.

== Plot ==
=== Novel ===
Thirty-two-year-old Kōji Sakuragi sees an ad that is scouting for young male singers to be a part of a new group named Shōnen Hollywood. Having once dreamed of being an idol himself, Kōji changes his name to Tsuyoshi Hiiragi and lies about being seventeen in order to get in and study at a well-known theatre in Shinjuku called Hollywood Tokyo, where the group will grow and develop their talents.

=== Shōnen Hollywood -Holly Stage for 49- ===
The anime takes place 15 years after the events of the novel.

== Characters ==
=== Shōnen Hollywood members ===
Kakeru Kazami (風見 颯)
Voiced by: Ryōta Ōsaka (Japanese); Micah Solusod (English)

Kakeru lived a "normal life" up until the director of Hollywood Tokyo came and scouted him. He is usually not assertive, accepting anything that comes before him. Later on, it is revealed that he cannot sing well; a problem which is eventually solved with the help of the other Shounen Hollywood members. His Hollywood color is red.

Ikuma Amaki (甘木 生馬)
Voiced by: Tetsuya Kakihara (Japanese); Alejandro Saab (English)

Makki is an ex-Yankee who didn't finish his high school. Due to this, he has problems in reading kanji. He is now the center of the idol group. Later on, it is revealed that the reason he left high school was because he got into a fight with his fellow Yankees. His Hollywood color is green.

Kira Saeki (佐伯 希星)
Voiced by: Daiki Yamashita (Japanese); Justin Briner (English)

Kira is a former child star actor with famous parents. Even though he is the youngest member of the group, he has the most professional experience. He is very serious about his work, saying that his dream is to find a job where he can perform in front of people, even when he's middle-aged. His Hollywood color is blue.

Daiki Tomii (富井 大樹)
Voiced by: Shouta Aoi (Japanese); Clifford Chapin (English)

Tomii is a big fan of the previous Shounen Hollywood idol group and joined the idol industry because of that. The brightest member of the group, he serves as their good luck charm. Later on, it is revealed that he grew up in an orphanage. He has idolized the previous generation's Tomii after the latter visited his orphanage.

Shun Maiyama (舞山 春)
Voiced by: Kensho Ono (Japanese); Austin Tindle (English)

Shun is a musician who joined Shounen Hollywood aiming to be an international star. Even though he loves teasing and is very prideful, he is actually serious when it comes to music.

=== Others ===
Kyōichi "Tesshi" Teshigawa (勅使河 原恭一)
Voiced by: Masashi Nitta

The assistant of Tsuyoto Hiiragi and the manager of Shounen Hollywood, whom he helps with their practice.

President / Tsuyoto Hiiragi (シャチョウ / 柊 剛人, Shachō / Hiiragi Tsuyoto)
Voiced by: Daisuke Namikawa

A member of the old Shounen Hollywood and the current president of Hollywood Tokyo.

Ran Kazehara (風原 乱)
Voiced by: Shintarō Asanuma

Member and leader of the old Shounen Hollywood. In the present, he got married, got a child, and started a cake shop.

Daichi Hirosawa (広澤 大地)
Voiced by: Sōichirō Hoshi

Member of the old Shounen Hollywood. Before becoming an idol, he used to be a construction worker; after Shounen Hollywood disbanded, he decided to continue his previous work.

Kō Ōsaki (大咲 香)
Voiced by: Yūto Suzuki

Member of the old Shounen Hollywood. He still works in the showbiz, mainly in the music industry.

Shima "Seama" Hayamizu (早水 海馬)
Voiced by: Kōsuke Toriumi

Member of the old Shounen Hollywood. In the present, he still works in the showbiz.

Minoru Tomii (富井 実)
Voiced by: Daisuke Sakaguchi

Member of the old Shounen Hollywood, where he was called "Tomii, the Good Luck Charm". He is now still working in the showbiz as an actor.

Ryūnosuke "Ryū" Date (伊達竜之介)
Voiced by: Daisuke Kishio

Member of the old Shounen Hollywood. When he was still a member of Shounen Hollywood, he was really cheerful and laughed about the smallest things. In the present, he works at Castle Resort Land as the bear mascot.

Cat (キャット, Kyatto)

Is a great horned owl that acts as guardian deity of the Hollywood Tokyo. He goes to the theater together with Tesshi and also goes home with him.
