= Kurage no Shokudō =

Japanese light novel

クラゲの食堂
- Light novel
- Written by: Miyako Aoyama
- Illustrated by: Zhao Yingle
- Published by: Kodansha
- Magazine: Box-Air
- Published: September 2, 2014
- Original video animation
- Directed by: Hiromi Taniguchi; Yutaka Uemura (assistant)
- Produced by: Tomoko Kawasaki; Haruki Hayashi; Hiromi Kuriki
- Written by: Chika Suzumura
- Music by: Shigenobu Ōkawa
- Studio: Zexcs
- Released: March 9, 2016
- Runtime: 29 minutes

Kurage no Shokudō (クラゲの食堂, lit. Jellyfish Restaurant) is a Japanese light novel written by Miyako Aoyama, with illustrations by Chinese artist Zhao Yingle. The novel was originally serialized in Kodansha's Box-Air online magazine starting in 2013, and was later published in a single volume on September 2, 2014. An original video animation (OVA) was released on March 9, 2016, on DVD and Blu-ray. The anime is produced by Zexcs, with Hiromi Taniguchi directing and designing the characters, Yutaka Uemura assisting with the direction and Chika Suzumura writing the scripts.
