= Daiki Yamashita =

Japanese voice actor (born 1989)

- 山下 大輝
- Born: September 7, 1989 (age 37); Hamamatsu, Shizuoka Prefecture, Japan
- Occupation: Voice actor
- Years active: 2012–present
- Agent: Arts Vision
- Notable work: My Hero Academia as Izuku Midoriya; JoJo's Bizarre Adventure: Golden Wind as Narancia Ghirga; Pokémon Journeys: The Series as Goh
- Website: yamashitadaiki.com

Daiki Yamashita (山下 大輝, Yamashita Daiki; born September 7, 1989) is a Japanese voice actor and singer affiliated with Arts Vision. He is best known for voicing the character Izuku Midoriya in the popular shonen anime My Hero Academia. He won the Best Male Newcomer award at the 8th Seiyu Awards.

== Filmography ==
=== Anime series ===
Year	Title	Roles	Notes	Ref(s)
2013	Arata: The Legend	Suguru Nishijima		
2013	Chronicles of the Going Home Club	Demon King		
2013	Gaist Crusher	Rekka Shirogane		
2013	Galilei Donna	Theo Escher		
2013	Log Horizon	Tōya, Iwan		
2013	Silver Spoon	Yūichi Matsuyama		
2013	Strike the Blood	Ryō Uchida		
2013	Tamako Market	Inuyama		
2013	Yowamushi Pedal	Sakamichi Onoda		
2013	The Pet Girl of Sakurasou	Young Man 3		
2013	Oreshura	Various characters		
2014	Ao Haru Ride	Naitō		
2014	Glasslip	Hiro Shirosaki		
2014	Log Horizon 2	Tōya		
2014	Oreca Battle	Val, Taddon		
2014	Pretty Guardian Sailor Moon Crystal	Gurio Umino		
2014	Psycho-Pass 2	Moe Suzuki		
2014	Shōnen Hollywood -Holly Stage for 49-	Kira Saeki		
2014	Space Dandy	Mio		
2014	Sword Art Online II	Jun		
2014	The Irregular at Magic High School	Hagane Tomitsuka		
2014	Yowamushi Pedal Grande Road	Sakamichi Onoda		
2015	Ace of Diamond 2nd Season	Takuma Seto		
2015	Charlotte	Oikawa		
2015	Kamisama Kiss◎	Mamoru (young, as a human child)		
2015	Lance N' Masques	Yōtarō Hanafusa		
2015	Mikagura School Suite	Usamaru		
2015	Rampo Kitan: Game of Laplace	Sōji Hashiba		
2015	Shōnen Hollywood -Holly Stage for 50-	Kira Saeki		
2015	Hokuto no Ken: Ichigo Aji	Bat		
2015	The Heroic Legend of Arslan	Borner		
2015	The Rolling Girls	Hitoshi		
2015	Triage X	Arashi Mikami (young)		
2015	Uta no Prince-sama Maji Love Revolutions	Shion Amakusa		
2015	Hetalia: World Twinkle	Ladonia		
2015	Mobile Suit Gundam: Iron-Blooded Orphans	Danji Enrei		
2016	Active Raid	Dog		
2016	Assassination Classroom Second Season	Rikuto Ikeda		
2016	Dimension W	Lwai-Aura-Tibesti		
2016	Handa-kun	Yukio Kondo		
2016	My Hero Academia	Izuku Midoriya		
2016	Prince of Stride: Alternative	Yuri Himemiya		
2016	Tonkatsu DJ Agetarō	Agetarō Katsumata		
2016	Twin Star Exorcists	Shinnosuke Kunizaki		
2016	Food Wars! Shokugeki no Soma: The Second Plate	Mitsuru Sotsuda		
2016	Trickster	Yoshio Kobayashi		
2016	Uta no Prince-sama Maji LOVE Legend Star	Shion Amakusa		
2016	Touken Ranbu: Hanamaru	Atsushi Toushirou and Imanotsurugi		
2016	Re:Zero − Starting Life in Another World	Kan		
2017	Anonymous Noise	Kanade Yuzuriha		
2017	Boruto: Naruto Next Generations	Magire Kakuremino		
2017	Chain Chronicle: The Light of Haecceitas	Aram		
2017	Yowamushi Pedal: New Generation	Sakamichi Onoda		
2017	My Hero Academia Season 2	Izuku Midoriya		
2017	Re:Creators	Sōta Mizushino		
2017	Children of the Whales	Ryodari		
2017	Sengoku Night Blood	Yukimura Sanada		
2017	Tsukipro The Animation	Sakuraba Ryota		
2017	Hitorijime My Hero	Mitsuru Fukushige		
2018	Beatless	Kengo Suguri		
2018	My Hero Academia Season 3	Izuku Midoriya		
2018	Rokuhōdō Yotsuiro Biyori	Tsubaki		
2018	100 Sleeping Princes and the Kingdom of Dreams	Navi, Cheshire Cat		
2018	Phantom in the Twilight	Wayne King		
2018	Touken Ranbu: Hanamaru 2	Atsushi Toushirou and Imanotsurugi		
2018	Ninja Girl & Samurai Master 3rd Season	Ranmaru Mori		
2018	Jingai-san no Yome	Tomari Hinowa		
2018	JoJo's Bizarre Adventure: Golden Wind	Narancia Ghirga		
2019	Namu Amida Butsu!: Rendai Utena	Karuraten		
2019	Nikki	Miyuki		
2019	Ace of Diamond Act II	Takuma Seto		
2019	Demon Slayer: Kimetsu no Yaiba	Yushirō		
2019	Attack on Titan Season 3	Young Zeke		
2019	Star-Myu: High School Star Musical 3	Shion Kasugano		
2019	Ensemble Stars!	Ritsu Sakuma		
2019	The Ones Within	Akatsuki Iride		
2019	Oresuki	Amatsuyu "Jouro" Kisaragi		
2019	Outburst Dreamer Boys	Yamato Noda		
2019	No Guns Life	Tetsurō Arahabaki		
2019	My Hero Academia Season 4	Izuku Midoriya		
2019	Pocket Monsters 2019	Goh		
2020	Super Nikki	Miyuki		
2020	Cagaster of an Insect Cage	Naji		
2020	Major 2nd Season 2	Akira Nishina		
2020	Genie Family 2020	Pūta		
2020	No Guns Life 2	Tetsurō Arahabaki		
2020	Wandering Witch: The Journey of Elaina	Brother		
2020	The Cheater	Chita Nagashima		
2021	Horimiya	Shū Iura		
2021	Log Horizon: Destruction of the Round Table	Tōya		
2021	Attack on Titan: The Final Season	Zeke Jaeger (young)		
2021	Super Nikki Season 2	Miyuki		
2021	My Hero Academia Season 5	Izuku Midoriya		
2021	Seven Knights Revolution: Hero Successor	Nemo		
2021	Full Dive	Hiroshi Yūki		
2021	Backflip!!	Shunsuke Azuma		
2021	86	Haruto Keats		
2021	Don't Toy with Me, Miss Nagatoro	Naoto Hachiōji		
2021	Yu-Gi-Oh! Sevens	Yuo Goha		
2021	Blue Period	Yotasuke Takahashi		
2021	Long Days Road To Taihei	Taihei Takamoto		
2021	Ranking of Kings	Hokuro		
2022	Platinum End	Shuji Nakaumi		
2022	Dance Dance Danseur	Junpei Murao		
2022	Tokyo Mew Mew New	Tart		
2022	Cardfight!! Vanguard will+Dress	Zinki Mukae		
2022	My Hero Academia Season 6	Izuku Midoriya		
2022	Shine Post	Naoki Hinase		
2022	Bleach: Thousand-Year Blood War	Ryūnosuke Yuki		
2023	Don't Toy with Me, Miss Nagatoro 2nd Attack	Naoto Hachiōji		
2023	Hell's Paradise: Jigokuraku	Yamada Asaemon Senta		
2023	The Ancient Magus' Bride Season 2	Violet St. George		
2023	Opus Colors	Kohei Tose		
2023	Rokudo's Bad Girls	Dо̄ji Matsugamiya		
2023	Pokémon Horizons: The Series	Rotom Phone		
2023	Horimiya: The Missing Pieces	Shū Iura		
2023	Reborn as a Vending Machine, I Now Wander the Dungeon	Aka		
2023	Captain Tsubasa: Junior Youth Arc	Alan Pascual		
2023	Ragna Crimson	Nebulim		
2023	Under Ninja	Shion Hachiya		
2023	Onimusha	Sahei		
2023	Rurouni Kenshin	Seta Sōjirō		
2024	Mysterious Disappearances	Ren Adashino		
2024	My Hero Academia Season 7	Izuku Midoriya		
2024	Failure Frame: I Became the Strongest and Annihilated Everything with Low-Level Spells	Tomohiro Yasu		
2024	Magilumiere Magical Girls Inc.	Kazuo Nikoyama		
2024	The Most Notorious "Talker" Runs the World's Greatest Clan	Noel Stollen		
2024	Cardfight!! Vanguard DivineZ 2nd Season	Jinki Mukae		
2025	Medaka Kuroiwa Is Impervious to My Charms	Shō Kobayakawa		
2025	Rurouni Kenshin: Kyoto Disturbance	Seta Sōjirō		
2025	Catch Me at the Ballpark!	Wataru Ichinomiya		
2025	Binan Kōkō Chikyū Bōei-bu Haikara!	Tasuku Nekoma		
2025	Sakamoto Days	Mafuyu Seba		
2025	Shabake	Ichitarō		
2025	My Hero Academia: Final Season	Izuku Midoriya		
2026	A Gentle Noble's Vacation Recommendation	Judge		
2026	A Tale of the Secret Saint	Fabian Winer		
2026	Ace of Diamond Act II season 2	Takuma Seto		
2026	Fist of the North Star	Bat		
2026	Horror Collector	Shota Togawa		
2027	Blade & Bastard	Raraja		
2027	The Reincarnated Elf Left on a Journey to Master His Magic	Liese		
TBA	Rebuild World	Akira		

=== Original video animation (OVA) ===
- Yowamushi Pedal (2013), Sakamichi Onoda
- Blue Spring Ride (2014), Naitō
- My Hero Academia: Save! Rescue Training (2016), Izuku Midoriya
- My Hero Academia: Training of the Dead (2017), Izuku Midoriya
- Oresuki: Oretachi no Game Set (2020), Amatsuyu "Jouro" Kisaragi

=== Special ===
- Oresuki: Ore wa Teinei ni Susumeru (2019), Amatsuyu "Jouro" Kisaragi

=== Anime films ===
- Tamako Love Story (2014), Inuyama
- Yowamushi Pedal Re:Ride (2014), Sakamichi Onoda
- The Empire of Corpses (2015), Nikolai Krasotkin
- Yowamushi Pedal Re: ROAD (2015), Sakamichi Onoda
- Yowamushi Pedal: The Movie (2015), Sakamichi Onoda
- Doraemon the Movie: Nobita's Treasure Island (2018), Flock
- My Hero Academia: Two Heroes (2018), Izuku Midoriya
- My Hero Academia: Heroes Rising (2019), Izuku Midoriya
- My Hero Academia: World Heroes' Mission (2021), Izuku Midoriya
- Ensemble Stars!! Road to Show!! (2022), Ritsu Sakuma
- Backflip!! (2022), Shunsuke Azuma
- Drifting Home (2022), Yuzuru Tachibana
- My Hero Academia: You're Next (2024), Izuku Midoriya
- The Rose of Versailles (2025), Jean

=== Video games ===
- Akiba's Trip: Undead & Undressed (2013), Kaito Tachibana
- Gaist Crusher (2013), Rekka Shirogane
- Age 12 (2014)
- Gaist Crusher God (2014), Rekka Shirogane
- Oreshika: Tainted Bloodlines (2014)
- Senjō no Waltz (2014), Richard
- Yome Collection (2014), Sakamichi Onoda
- Granblue Fantasy (2014), Young Cat
- Dragalia Lost (2018), Ricardt, Delphi
- Tokyo Xanadu (2015), Yuuki Shinomiya
- Yowamushi Pedal High Cadence to Tomorrow (2015), Sakamichi Onoda
- Ensemble Stars! (2015), Ritsu Sakuma
- Touken Ranbu (2015), Imanotsurugi, Atsushi Toushirou
- The Idolm@ster: SideM (2016), Kirio Nekoyanagi
- The Cinderella Contract (2014—present), Prince Cyril Evan Ingrays (Cyril)
- Tsuki no Paradise (2016–present), Sakuraba Ryouta
- My Hero One's Justice (2018), Izuku Midoriya
- Food Fantasy (2018) – Escargot, Tom Yum, Omurice
- Jump Force (2019) - Izuku Midoriya
- Wizard's Symphony (2019), Volk Dartfang
- Astral Chain (2019) - Harold "Hal" Clark
- Hero's Park (2019), Domyo Keito
- Namu Amida Butsu! -UTENA- (2019), Karuraten
- Pokémon Masters (2019), Hau
- Grand Chase: Dimensional Chaser - Veigas Terre
- My Hero: One's Justice 2 (2020) - Izuku Midoriya
- Fate Grand Order (2020) - Oda Nobukatsu
- JoJo's Bizarre Adventure: Last Survivor (2020) - Narancia Ghirga
- Tale of Food (2020) - Zǐtuīyàn
- Jack Jeanne (2021) - Oshinari Tsukasa
- JoJo's Bizarre Adventure: All Star Battle R (2022), Narancia Ghirga
- The Seven Deadly Sins: Grand Cross (2023) - Baldr
- The Hundred Line: Last Defense Academy (2025) - Shion

=== Japanese dubbing ===
==== Live-action ====
Title	Role	Voice dub for	Notes	Ref(s)
Dear Eleanor	Billy	Joel Courtney		
Love Island	Tre Forte			
The Maze Runner	Newt	Thomas Brodie-Sangster		
Maze Runner: The Scorch Trials	Newt	Thomas Brodie-Sangster		
Maze Runner: The Death Cure	Newt	Thomas Brodie-Sangster		

==== Animation ====
Title	Role	Notes	Ref(s)
All Saints Street	Neil		
Sing 2	Jerry		
The Super Mario Galaxy Movie	Bowser Jr.		
Victor and Valentino	Victor		
Dragon Raja: The Blazing Dawn	Lu Mingfei		

=== Other ===
- Asa Dayo! Kai Shain - Unio douglasiae
