= Zexcs =

Japanese animation studio

Zexcs, Inc.
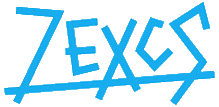
- Native name: 有限会社ゼクシズ
- Romanized name: Yūgen-gaisha Zekushizu
- Type: Yūgen gaisha
- Industry: Japanese animation
- Founded: January 23, 1998; 28 years ago
- Headquarters: Mukodaichi, Koganei, Tokyo, Japan
- Key people: Kiyoshi Shintaku (CEO)
- Owner: Fan Media
- Number of employees: 66 (as of October 2025)
- Website: zexcs.co.jp

Zexcs, Inc. (Japanese: 有限会社ゼクシズ, Hepburn: Yūgen-gaisha Zekushizu) is a Japanese animation studio located in Koganei, Tokyo, Japan. It was established on January 23, 1998, by former J.C.Staff producer Tomoko Kawasaki and is known for doing the animation production of series such as Sister Princess and Diabolik Lovers. Zexcs is also known for its work in cooperation with its sister company Feel.

== Productions ==
=== Television series ===
Title	Director(s)	First run start date	First run end date	Eps	Note(s)
Sister Princess	Kiyotaka Ohata (1–12); Ikuji Inada (13–26)	April 4, 2001	September 26, 2001	26	Adaptation of a light novel series written by Sakurako Kimino.
Sister Princess: RePure	Tsubane Shimodaya; Nagisa Miyazaki	October 4, 2002	December 25, 2002	13	Sequel to Sister Princess.
Kikō Sennyo Rōran	Toshiki Hirano	November 15, 2002	May 30, 2003	28	Anime original.
Da Capo	Nagisa Miyazaki	July 5, 2003	December 27, 2003	26	Based on an adult visual novel by Circus.
Final Approach	Takashi Yamamoto	October 3, 2004	December 26, 2004	13	Based on an adult visual novel by Princess Soft.
Sukisho	Haruka Ninomiya	January 9, 2005	March 27, 2005	12	Adaptation of a light novel series written by Riho Sawaki.
Canvas 2: Niji Iro no Sketch	Itsuro Kawasaki	October 2, 2005	March 26, 2006	24	Based on an adult visual novel by F&C FC01.
Mamoru-kun ni Megami no Shukufuku o!	Itsuro Kawasaki	October 6, 2006	March 30, 2007	24	Adaptation of a light novel series written by Hiroki Iwata.
Mushi-Uta	Kazuo Sakai	July 6, 2007	October 5, 2007	12	Adaptation of a light novel series written by Kyouhei Iwai; Production; animation by Beat Frog
Rental Magica	Itsuro Kawasaki	October 8, 2007	March 24, 2008	24	Adaptation of a light novel series written by Makoto Sanda.
H_{2}O: Footprints in the Sand	Hideki Tachibana	January 4, 2008	March 21, 2008	12	Based on an adult visual novel by Makura.
Our Home's Fox Deity.	Yoshiaki Iwasaki	April 7, 2008	September 15, 2008	24	Adaptation of a light novel series written by Jin Shibamura.
Magician's Academy	Takaomi Kanasaki	October 6, 2008	December 22, 2008	12	Adaptation of a light novel series written by Ichirō Sakaki.
Chrome Shelled Regios	Itsuro Kawasaki	January 11, 2009	June 21, 2009	24	Adaptation of a light novel series written by Shūsuke Amagi.
Umi Monogatari	Yuu Kou; Junichi Sato	June 25, 2009	September 17, 2009	12	Based on a pachinko game manufactured by Sanyo Bussan.
Chu-Bra!!	Yukina Hiiro	January 4, 2010	March 22, 2010	12	Adaptation of a manga series written by Yumi Nakata.
Omamori Himari	Shinji Ushiro	January 7, 2010	March 25, 2010	12	Adaptation of a manga series written by Milan Matra.
The Legend of the Legendary Heroes	Itsuro Kawasaki	July 2, 2010	December 17, 2010	24	Adaptation of a light novel series written by Takaya Kagami.
Fortune Arterial: Akai Yakusoku	Munenori Nawa	October 9, 2010	December 25, 2010	12	Based on an adult visual novel by August. Co-animated with Feel.
I Don't Like You at All, Big Brother!!	Keitaro Motonaga	January 9, 2011	March 27, 2011	12	Adaptation of a manga series written by Kouichi Kusano.
A Dark Rabbit Has Seven Lives	Takashi Yamamoto	July 9, 2011	September 24, 2011	12	Adaptation of a light novel series written by Takaya Kagami.
Say I Love You	Toshimasa Kuroyanagi; Takuya Satō	October 7, 2012	December 30, 2012	13	Adaptation of a manga series written by Kanae Hazuki.
Cuticle Detective Inaba	Susumu Mitsunaka	January 4, 2013	March 22, 2013	12	Adaptation of a manga series written by Mochi.
The Flowers of Evil	Hiroshi Nagahama	April 5, 2013	June 30, 2013	13	Adaptation of a manga series written by Shūzō Oshimi.
Diabolik Lovers	Shinobu Tagashira	September 16, 2013	December 9, 2013	12	Based on an adult visual novel franchise by Rejet.
Lady Jewelpet	Itsuro Kawasaki	April 5, 2014	March 28, 2015	52	The 6th installment of the Jewelpet anime franchise. Co-animated with Studio Comet.
The Comic Artist and His Assistants	Takeshi Furuta	April 8, 2014	June 24, 2014	12	Adaptation of a 4-panel manga series by Hiroyuki.
Shōnen Hollywood -Holly Stage for 49-	Toshimasa Kuroyanagi	July 6, 2014	September 27, 2014	13	Based on a Japanese media franchise by Ikuyo Hashiguchi.
Shōnen Hollywood -Holly Stage for 50-	Toshimasa Kuroyanagi	January 10, 2015	April 4, 2015	13	Sequel to Shōnen Hollywood.
Diabolik Lovers More, Blood	Risako Yoshida	September 24, 2015	December 10, 2015	12	Sequel to Diabolik Lovers.
A Simple Thinking About Blood Type	Yoshihasa Ōyama	October 13, 2015	March 29, 2016	24	The third and fourth seasons of A Simple Thinking About Blood Type; Co-animated with Assez Finaud Fabric and Feel.
The Great Passage	Toshimasa Kuroyanagi	October 14, 2016	December 23, 2016	11	Based on a novel written by Shion Miura.
Frame Arms Girl	Keiichiro Kawaguchi	April 4, 2017	June 20, 2017	12	Based on a model kit line by Kotobukiya. Co-animated with Studio A-Cat.
Rokuhōdō Yotsuiro Biyori	Tomomi Kamiya	April 10, 2018	June 26, 2018	12	Adaptation of a manga series written by Yū Shimizu.
Shadowverse	Keiichiro Kawaguchi	April 7, 2020	March 23, 2021	48	Based on a digital collectible card video game by Cygames.
Backflip!!	Seishirō Nagaya; Toshimasa Kuroyanagi	April 9, 2021	June 25, 2021	12	Anime original.
Shadowverse Flame	Keiichiro Kawaguchi	April 2, 2022	September 28, 2024	98	Second series of Shadowverse.
Akane-banashi	Ayumu Watanabe	April 4, 2026	June 20, 2026	12	Adaptation of a manga series written by Yuki Suenaga.
Akane-banashi (season 2)	Ayumu Watanabe	January 2027	TBA	TBA	Sequel to Akane-banashi.

=== Original video animations ===
Title	Director	Release date	Eps	Note(s)
10 Tokyo Warriors	Noboru Ishiguro; Hikaru Takanashi	July 25, 1999– January 25, 2002	6	Anime original.
Haruka: Beyond the Stream of Time ~Ajisai Yumegatari~	Iku Suzuki	March 27, 2002– January 22, 2003	3	Based on an otome adventure game by Ruby Party.
Happy World!	Takashi Ikehata	December 13, 2002– June 27, 2003	3	Adaptation of a manga series written by Kenjirō Takeshita.
Saishū Shiken Kujira	Nagisa Miyazaki	August 25, 2007– November 10, 2007	5	Based on an adult visual novel by Circus.
Da Capo: If	Kenichiro Komaya	December 25, 2008– March 25, 2009	2	OVA episodes for Da Capo.
Fortune Arterial: Akai Yakusoku	Munenori Nawa	February 26, 2011	1	OVA bundled with the 6th manga volume.
Jewelpet Twinkle☆: A Rainbow of Smiles Doki☆Doki!	Takashi Yamamoto	July 21, 2013	1	OVA episode for Jewelpet Twinkle.
The Comic Artist and His Assistants	Takeshi Furuta	June 25, 2014– November 26, 2014	6	OVA episode for The Comic Artist and His Assistants.
Nozo × Kimi	Masato Jinbo	August 18, 2014– April 18, 2015	3	Adaptation of a manga series written by Wakō Honna.
Kurage no Shokudō	Hiromi Taniguchi	March 9, 2016	1	Adaptation of a light novel series written by Miyako Aoyama.
Your Light ~Kase-san and Morning Glories~	Takuya Satō	May 7, 2017	1	A five-minute animation clip of Kase-san.
Kase-san and Morning Glories	Takuya Satō	June 9, 2018	1	Adaptation of a manga series written by Hiromi Takashima.

=== Films ===
Title	Director(s)	Release date	Note(s)
Aruvu Rezuru: Kikaijikake no Yōseitachi	Tatsuya Yoshihara	March 2, 2013	Adaptation of a light novel series by Yū Yamaguchi.
Frame Arms Girl: Kyakkyau Fufu na Wonderland	Keiichiro Kawaguchi	June 29, 2019	Compilation film for Frame Arms Girl.
Backflip!!	Toshimasa Kuroyanagi	July 2, 2022	Sequel to Backflip.
