= Backflip!! =

Japanese anime television series

- Anime key visual

バクテン!!
- Genre: Sports (Rhythmic gymnastics)
- Manga
- Illustrated by: Kei Sakuraba
- Published by: Kodansha
- Magazine: Dessert
- Original run: January 22, 2021 – September 24, 2021
- Volumes: 2
- Anime television series
- Directed by: Seishirō Nagaya; Toshimasa Kuroyanagi
- Written by: Toshizou Nemoto
- Music by: Yuki Hayashi
- Studio: Zexcs
- Licensed by: Crunchyroll (streaming); SA/SEA: Medialink
- Original network: Fuji TV (Noitamina)
- English network: US: Crunchyroll Channel
- Original run: April 9, 2021 – June 25, 2021
- Episodes: 12
- Anime film
- Directed by: Toshimasa Kuroyanagi
- Written by: Toshizou Nemoto
- Music by: Yuki Hayashi
- Studio: Zexcs
- Licensed by: Crunchyroll
- Released: July 2, 2022
- Runtime: 90 minutes

Backflip!! (バクテン!!, "Bakuten!!") is an original Japanese anime television series produced by Zexcs, directed by Seishirō Nagaya and Toshimasa Kuroyanagi and written by Toshizo Nemoto. The series aired from April to June 2021. A manga adaptation by Kei Sakuraba was serialized in Kodansha's Dessert manga magazine from January 22 to September 24, 2021. An anime film premiered on July 2, 2022.

== Story ==
Shotaro Futaba loved sports, but was never good enough. But watching a group of gymnasts in the park and seeing them in a gymnastics tournament, he decides to join their school and become part of the gymnastic team. With new members, Shotaro and Ryoya Misato, the team aims for the upcoming Inter-High tournament.

== Characters ==
=== Sōshūkan High School ===
Also known as Ao High School. Their men's rhythmic gymnastics team is attempting to perform at the Inter-High for the first time.

Shōtarō Futaba (双葉翔太郎, Futaba Shōtarō)

Voiced by: Shimba Tsuchiya
The protagonist and a first year student. He played a number of sports before high school, but was always on the sidelines. After witnessing a performance of the Sōshūkan men's rhythmic gymnastic team at a tournament, he joins their club, even though he has no gymnastics experience. He is inspired by Misato and his senior teammates.

Ryōya Misato (美里良夜, Misato Ryōya)

Voiced by: Kaito Ishikawa
A first year and the ace of his gymnastics team in middle school. He joined Sōshūkan because he was inspired by the coach's performance. He is an orphan who lived with his aunt. He is rather stoic, but he makes an effort to rely on his teammates. He is a major inspiration for Shōtarō.

Masamune Shichigahama (七ヶ浜政宗, Shichigahama Masamune)

Voiced by: Daisuke Ono
A third year and the captain of the Sōshūkan men's rhythmic gymnastics team. He is enthusiastic and encouraging. He was very involved in recruiting members to raise the team to 6. His interests in gymnastics began after seeing Shūsaku's backflips. His family has a sasa kamaboko business. His rival is Takase.

Keisuke Tsukidate (築館敬助, Tsukidate Keisuke)

Voiced by: Takashi Kondō
A third year and vice captain, an all rounder in gymnastics and a calm and collected type. He was inspired to join the team after seeing Shichigahama's backflip. He likes moss and plants. His family manages a shrine.

Nagayoshi Onagawa (女川ながよし, Onagawa Nagayoshi)

Voiced by: Hiro Shimono
A third year and the ace of the Sōshūkan men's rhythmic gymnastics team. He joined the team after he got interested seeing Shichigahama's backflip. A running gag is him coming up with new nicknames for Shōtarō and Masato, which the two juniors always reject. He is an ardent fan of Masami Kudo, a member of the idol group Tan Tan Girls. His father is a fishmonger.

Kōtarō Watari (亘理光太郎, Watari Kōtarō)

Voiced by: Hiroshi Kamiya
A second year. He joined the men's rhythmic gymnastics club after seeing his seniors perform. He acts tough, but he has a soft heart. He is a very big fan of yakuza movies. His family manages a ramen shop, and he is good at cooking.

Shūsaku Shida (志田周作, Shida Shūsaku)

Voiced by: Takahiro Sakurai
The coach of the Sōshūkan men's rhythmic gymnastics club. He is the inspiration of the Sōshūkan men's rhythmic gymnastics club members. He was formerly the ace of Hakumei University, capable enough to make Men's Rhythmic Gymnastic become an Olympic event. He was arrogant, but after retiring from performing due to a leg injury, he became a patient individual. He often attributes his advice to his wife, though the gymnastics team has never met her.

Asawo Kurikoma (栗駒あさを, Kurikoma Asawo)

Voiced by: Ayane Sakura
The manager of the club, she is also Shida's relative. She is quiet, but well integrated with the rest of the team. She is tech savvy, and uses videos and software to review practices and mimic choreography. She designs the team's costumes.

=== Hakumei University Affiliated High School ===
Mashiro Tsukiyuki (月雪ましろ, Tsukiyuki Mashiro)

Voiced by: Ayumu Murase
A first year prodigy. Similar to Futaba, he was in multiple clubs before a rhythmic gymnastics club, but he quit them because he found them boring. He started gymnastics after seeing Misato perform and stayed since Misato provides him good competition. He initially did not have much interest in Futaba, but later becomes curious after seeing him perform. He is mostly aloof and playful, doing things at his own pace. He gets involved in games so much that he does not notice his seniors trying to contact him.

Tōru Takase (高瀬亨, Takase Tōru)

Voiced by: Katsuyuki Konishi
A third year student and the captain of the team. He has been Shichigahama's rival since their first meeting. He considers Ao High to be worthy rivals.

Yōjirō Mutsu (陸奥洋二郎, Mutsu Yōjirō)

Voiced by: Kenichi Suzumura
A third year student and the vice-captain of the team. He helps manage the captain's excessive emotions. Though he always stops Takase from scolding Mashiro, Mashiro is more scared of him. He is impressed by the performance of Ao high students and considers them worthy rivals.

Hideo Ōminato (大湊秀夫, Ōminato Hideo)

Voiced by: Tomokazu Sugita
A second year student. He is a fan of Kazamaura Aki from Aomori Nebuta Dream and has a rivalry with Onagawa over what type of idols they like.

Kyōichi Ryūgamori (竜ヶ森恭一, Ryūgamori Kyōichi)

Voiced by: Soma Saito
A second year student. He has a calm and aloof personality. He is good with plants and arranges flowers to look better and hold longer when he sees them. He shares a friendship with Tsukidate due to their common interest in plants.

Shunsuke Azuma (吾妻俊介, Azuma Shunsuke)

Voiced by: Daiki Yamashita
A first year student. He is the loudest in the team and also a fan of yakuza movies, albeit preferring characters which get the girl and win in the end, as opposed to Watari's preferences.

Shūji Mabuchi (馬淵修司, Mabuchi Shūji)

Voiced by: Kenichirou Matsuda
The coach of Hakumei Private High School and alumni of Hakumei University. He was captain of the team when Shida was on it. He believes that if Shida had not retired due to injury, he could have taken Men's Rhythmic Gymnastic to a level where it would have become a part of Olympics. He was also one of the few who lent a helping hand to Shida after his injury.

=== Other characters ===
Ayumi Futaba (双葉亜由美, Futaba Ayumi)

Voiced by: Reina Ueda

== Production and release ==
On November 4, 2020, Fuji TV announced the original anime television series, which is part of the "Zutto Ōen Project 2011 + 10...", commemorating the 10th anniversary of the 2011 Tōhoku earthquake and tsunami. The series is animated by Zexcs, directed by Seishirō Nagaya and Toshimasa Kuroyanagi and written by Toshizo Nemoto. Original character designs are provided by Robico, the author of My Little Monster, while Yūki Shibata adapts the designs for animation. Yuki Hayashi is composing the series' music. It aired in Fuji TV's Noitamina programming block from April 9 to June 25, 2021. Centimillimental performed the series' opening theme song "Seishun no Enbu", while wacci performed the series' ending theme song "Anata ga Iru". Crunchyroll streamed the series outside of Asia.

After the conclusion of the anime series, an anime film was announced. It premiered in Japan on July 2, 2022, with returning staff and cast. Crunchyroll streamed the film outside of Japan, premiering May 11, 2023.

=== Episode list ===
No.	Title	Directed by (Note: Information is taken from the ending credits of each episode.)	Storyboarded by	Original release date
1	"I Want to Backflip!"; Transliteration: "Bakuten Shitai!" (Japanese: バク転したい！)	Toshimasa Kuroyanagi	Toshimasa Kuroyanagi	April 9, 2021 (Note: This episode aired at 1:10 a.m. JST, 15 minutes after the original air time on Fuji TV.)
A middle schooler in baseball club, Shōtarō Futaba chances upon a group of boys holding a headstand. Following them into a gym, he encounters Men's Rhythmic Gymnastic club for the first time at a tournament and becomes a fan of the backflips performed by the athletes from Sōshūkan High School. He later decides to join the school. Though initially nervous since the genius Ryōya Misato announces that he will join the club, he later announces that he wants to join the club himself after performing the first backflip of his life. The other members are ecstatic to have a full team of six members.
2	"I Want to Soar With You"; Transliteration: "Issho ni Tobitai!" (Japanese: 一緒に跳びたい！)	Seishirō Nagaya	Seishirō Nagaya	April 16, 2021
The coach suggests the first-years move to the dorm along with the rest of the teammates, but Misato refuses saying he needs to go home every evening. The next day, the boys jog over to Sekiou University gym to use the mat there. The coach suggests that they do the routine with all six members this year, but only if Shōtarō can backflip the entire length of the mat, giving him a week to practice. He assigns Misato to coach him. Misato shows him his own backflip after realizing that Shōtarō learns best by watching others perform. The last night of the 'practice' week, Misato returns to the dorm to coach Shōtarō more, where the seniors have made a makeshift mat for Shōtarō to practice on. The seniors all admit to having started Rhythmic Gymnastics since they were impressed by backflips. The next day, Shōtarō performs his backflip and gets approval from the coach to practice. After introducing themselves, Hakumei High shows off their performance to Sōshūkan High members, who are left totally speechless.
3	"I want to camp!" Transliteration: "Gasshuku Shitai!" (Japanese: 合宿したい！)	Yoshiyuki Fujiwara	Yoshiyuki Fujiwara	April 23, 2021
Being new to the 6-people routine, the team is making a lot of mistakes. The coach decides that having a joint practice would be inspiring for the team and schedules one with the Hakumei High School. Shōtarō is still struggling with headstands. The rest of the team (minus Shōtarō, who is practicing his headstands and Misato, who is home) decides to go shopping to welcome the guests, where they chance upon Misato and end up meeting the captain and the vice-captain of their rival team. As Shōtarō continues his practice in the park, he gets interrupted by Mashiro, who is separated from his team and is playing tag with a bunch of kids. While initially mentioning that his headstand sucks, Mashiro makes Shōtarō join the game, and later shows him his own handstand. This inspired Shōtarō to improve his own performance. He later guides Mashiro to his school, where he discovers that Mashiro is a part of Hakumei High school, and the rest of his team is shocked by Mashiro calling Misato 'Misa-pon'.
4	"We're All Rivals!"; Transliteration: "Raibaru nan da!" (Japanese: ライバルなんだ！)	Miwa Sasaki	Miwa Sasaki	April 30, 2021
While Mashiro is completely impressed by the sasa kamaboko, Takase shows off his team's discipline in the dorm. As both the coaches oversee the teams' practice, Kurikoma shows the Sōshūkan members that their coach Shida used to be a former top-class athlete in Rhythmic Gymnastic. After another round of performance, the Sōshūkan acknowledge their inferior performance. Shichigahama apologizes to Shida for wasting the opportunity, but after a pep talk from their coach later realizes that each member was focusing too much on syncing, whereas they should be more worried about their individual performances. Meanwhile, Takase and Mutsu convince the other members that Sōshūkan is a worthy team. They return and both teams gather for a welcoming first-year's party. All of the boys bond over hobbies and get to know each other. The next day, Sōshūkan performs again, which turns out to be far better than their previous one, making the team more confident.
5	"I Want to Hide!"; Transliteration: "Kakuretai!" (Japanese: かくれたい！)	Hayato Sakai	Seishirō Nagaya	May 7, 2021 (Note: This episode aired at 1:15 a.m. JST, 20 minutes after the original air time on Fuji TV.)
With time remaining after concluding practice, Mashiro suggests that the teams compete in game of Hide and Seek in the school late at night. The two captains end up being the seekers, with everyone else, including the coaches, hiding in the school. While the captains are unable to find even a single person, the members of the two teams end up bonding over their common interests, eventually arguing over them. Shōtarō is joined by Misato and later Mashiro, who happily reminisces over how he joined Men's Rhythmic Gymnastic club after being impressed looking at Misato perform. Meanwhile, Mabuchi, who is hiding with Shida and Kurikoma, laments Shida's injury which caused him to stop playing the sport. Throughout the game, the rest of the team gets captured by a shadowy figure. Finally, the captains, too, end up being captured by the security guard and brought to the guard room, where the boys are all already gathered, claiming they were brought there by the second security guard. However, the old guard who brought the captains there claims that he is the only guard present, which spooks everyone.
6	"Enjoy!"; Transliteration: "Tanoshinde!" (Japanese: 楽しんで！)	Tetsuya Endō; Seishirō Nagaya	Yoshiyuki Fujiwara; Toshimasa Kuroyanagi	May 14, 2021
The Ao High School team is set to perform at the prefecture tournament. They need to place 1st or 2nd to go through to regionals. Shotaro has doubts and feels he is not good enough to perform with the team, especially as he struggles to maintain form with his handstand. Coach Shida recognizes that Shotaro has no difficulty performing the handstand when practicing solo. The Ao High School team is last to perform, feeling uncertain about being able to reach a qualifying score with two teams placing high scores. As each team member leaves the warm-up area to enter the stage, Coach Shida tells them to enjoy themselves. He recognizes that Shotaro looks uncertain and encourages him that he has a gift, and that his earnestness alone is a gift. He tells Shotaro to enjoy being nervous. As they perform, Shotaro is able to hold his handstand. Onagawa makes a mistake that causes deductions, but the team's score earns them second place, securing advancement to the regional tournament.
7	"We'll Make a Promise!"; Transliteration: "Yakusoku Shimasu!" (Japanese: 約束します！)	Ryōji Masuyama	Ryōji Masuyama	May 21, 2021
8	"I'll Look After You!"; Transliteration: "Osewa Shimasu!" (Japanese: お世話します！)	Kuniyasu Nishina	Susumu Mitsunaka	May 28, 2021 (Note: This episode aired at 1:05 a.m. JST, 10 minutes after the original air time on Fuji TV.)
9	"Be Needy!"; Transliteration: "Amaete yo!" (Japanese: 甘えてよ！)	Yoshiyuki Fujiwara	Yoshiyuki Fujiwara	June 4, 2021
10	"I Can't Stand It!"; Transliteration: "Gaman Dekinai!" (Japanese: 我慢出来ない！)	Miwa Sasaki	Shinsaku Sasaki	June 11, 2021
11	"Give It Your All, Fight Hard"; Transliteration: "Zenryoku de, Omoikiri!" (Japanese: 全力で、思い切り！)	Seishirō Nagaya	Seishirō Nagaya	June 18, 2021
12	"Tomorrow, Too!"; Transliteration: "Ashita mo!" (Japanese: 明日も！)	Kuniyasu Nishina; Toshimasa Kuroyanagi	Toshimasa Kuroyanagi	June 25, 2021
