= A Simple Thinking About Blood Type =

Korean webcomic by Park Dong-Sun

- Cover of the first manga volume

血液型くん! (Ketsuekigata-kun!)
- Genre: Comedy
- Manga
- Written by: Real Crazy Man
- Published by: Earth Star Entertainment
- Original run: January 26, 2013 – present
- Volumes: 5
- Anime television series
- Directed by: Yoshihisa Ōyama
- Written by: Kenichi Yamashita
- Music by: Daisuke Hiraki
- Studio: Feel (seasons 1–4); Assez Finaud Fabric (seasons 1–4); Zexcs (seasons 3–4)
- Original network: Tokyo MX (seasons 1–4); AT-X (seasons 1–4); Nico Nico Douga (seasons 1–3)
- Original run: April 7, 2013 – March 29, 2016
- Episodes: 49

A Simple Thinking About Blood Type (Korean: 혈액형에 관한 간단한 고찰; RR: Hyeoraekyeonge Gwanhan Gandanhan Gochal) is a South Korean four-panel webtoon by art teacher Park Dong-sun (박동선) under the art name "Real Crazy Man". The webtoon is themed around blood type personality classification and is serialized on Dong-sun's blog. The webtoon has been published in book form and has been adapted into an anime series.

== Releases and adaptions ==
A Simple Thinking About Blood Type was first serialized on Dong-sun's blog as a webtoon. Japanese publisher Times Culture later published the comic in book form as Ketsuekigata-kun! (血液型くん!; lit. 'Mr. Bloodtype') in 2013.

A short anime adaptation was made by Japanese production houses Assez Finaund Fabric and Feel in 2013, with a second season in January 2015. Zexcs co-produced a third season, which began airing in October 2015. A fourth season aired in 2016.

== Characters ==
Each of the voice actors also represents their own blood type.

Type A-kun (A型くん, A Gata-kun)
Voiced by: Jun Fukuyama
Type B-kun (B型くん, B Gata-kun)
Voiced by: Yuichi Nakamura
Type AB-kun (AB型くん, AB Gata-kun)
Voiced by: Tetsuya Kakihara
Type O-kun (O型くん, O Gata-kun)
Voiced by: Akira Ishida
Type A-chan (A型ちゃん, A Gata-chan)
Voiced by: Aoi Yūki
Type B-chan (B型ちゃん, B Gata-chan)
Voiced by: Yui Horie
Type AB-chan (AB型ちゃん, AB Gata-chan)
Voiced by: Mai Nakahara
Type O-chan (O型ちゃん, O Gata-chan)
Voiced by: Yu Kobayashi
