= Louis Guiabern =

Metaphor: ReFantazio antagonist

- Louis Guiabern in Metaphor: ReFantazio
- First appearance: Metaphor: ReFantazio (2024)
- Designed by: Shigenori Soejima
- Voiced by: EN: Joseph Tweedale; JA: Yuichi Nakamura

Louis Guiabern is a fictional character and the main antagonist in the 2024 video game Metaphor: ReFantazio. He is responsible for the assassination of the king of the game's world, and the protagonist and his allies seek to kill Louis in order to break the curse placed on the prince. He is protected by the king's magic, which emerged to prevent someone from taking the throne by force, and instead requiring them to earn the majority support of the kingdom's people. He is noted for his proficiency in hunting large, monstrous beings called "humans", that roam the lands. He was designed by Shigenori Soejima, and was designed to be as appealing as the protagonist and to be seen as a "second protagonist."

Louis has received generally positive reception, with multiple critics praising him as a breakout star of Metaphor and among the best villains in Atlus games and Japanese role-playing games in general. He was noted for being a sympathetic villain in spite of his brutal and evil actions. He has also been compared to Lucifer including its incarnations in Atlus' Megami Tensei franchise, as well as villains in anime and manga, such as Griffith from Berserk.

== Appearances ==
In Metaphor: ReFantazio, Louis is first seen assassinating the addled king of the United Kingdom of Euchronia, intent on taking over the kingdom. The protagonist, named Will, alongside a man named Grius and a fairy named Gallica, are dispatched to kill him in order to break a curse on the prince, who is believed to have been cursed by Louis. He has an antagonistic relationship with other characters, including Strohl, whose village he ordered to be destroyed by humans, monstrous creatures that roam the world, and Hulkenberg, who aims to save the prince after failing to do so years prior. Louis preaches of the dangers of humans, and is proficient in dispatching the creatures.

During the royal funeral, Grius attempts to assassinate Louis, but is prevented by the king's magic due to it preventing popular candidates from the throne from being harmed outside of certain exceptions, allowing Louis to kill Grius. The king's magic then declares that whomever shall take the throne must be supported by the general public, his chief competition being the leader of the Sanctist Church, Forden. Will and his allies, their intentions against Louis having not been discovered, seek to gain Louis' favor in order to get close to him and find a way to break the curse without killing him to avoid the wrath of the king's magic. After failing to find a way to break the curse this way, they instead seek a spear that could kill him without incurring the king's magic. They initially mortally wound him, but Zorba, one of Louis' allies who is able to reanimate the dead, manages to save his life, utilizing the spear to kill Forden. It is also eventually revealed that it was Rella, under Forden's orders, who ordered the prince's cursing, while Louis was just a scapegoat.

Louis has multiple allies, including Zorba, Junah, Basilio, and Fidelio, the latter two having joined him because of their belief that he would improve the lives of paripus, the race they belong to. However, Junah betrays him, revealing to have been working with a resistance cell to cure the prince by breaking the curse, Basilio joins Will's party after Louis kills Fidelio, his brother, after the latter sacrificed his life to stop Louis from killing an innocent family, and Zorba, having been partially transformed into a human, is defeated by Will and his team. As Will manages to become more popular, Louis, having manipulated him into accepting a duel in Grand Trad, uses magic to warp him into a human in front of the crowd spectating the battle, causing his popularity to plummet and Louis to run largely unopposed. He goes to take the Royal Sceptre, an object reserved only for the future leader.

To the spirit of the king, he reveals that he is actually an elda, much like Will, who lived in the eldan village the church had destroyed years ago, and initially respected the king as an idealist but felt betrayed when he believed Forden's scapegoating. His goal is also revealed to transform everyone into humans, with only those strong enough to overcome this trial being able to survive. With Will having fused with the prince, he and his allies, having regained their popularity after breaking a group of magla-infused crystals that incited insanity amongst the commoners, encounter Louis once again in the Royal Palace, where he tries to make an offer for the protagonist to join him. (Note: The protagonist may accept Louis' offer and join his side, resulting in a bad ending where he and Louis rule a world overrun by humans.) However, Will refuses, and Louis, having created a magla-infused star with the Royal Sceptre, awaits a final confrontation with the protagonist and his allies retreating to Grand Trad to prepare.

After Will and his allies enter the star and make it through the human-infested rock formations, they face Louis once more. He utilizes the Royal Sceptre's power to manifest his own Archetype, the Archdemon, but is defeated by the group. Louis escapes through his skyrunner, Charadrius, and after Will's allies sacrifice themselves to hold off an increasing amount of humans, confronts him once more. Louis attempts to turn Will into a human once more, but he rips out his own heart, killing him. However, Will is saved at the last minute by More, who, after a battle, allows him to return to life with his allies by his side. In his confrontation with Will's allies, Louis succumbs to his own anxiety and transforms into a human merged with the body of the Charadrius; after Will and his allies destroy his human form's three masks, revealing Louis' twisted face, the group manages to defeat him. However, Louis makes a last-ditch attempt to destroy the group by inflicting them with an endless amount of magla, but Will, now infused with the power of kings, destroys him and wins the Tournament for the Throne.

== Concept and creation ==
Louis was designed by Metaphor artist Shigenori Soejima, who designed him with the intention of making him as appealing as the protagonist. They also aimed for him to be seen as a second protagonist. He is voiced by Yuichi Nakamura in Japanese and Joseph Tweedale in English.

== Reception ==
The Escapist writer Zhiqing Wan felt that Louis was the "real star" of Metaphor, feeling that Louis' debut in Metaphor early on helps make the game's story feel more focused than Persona 3 and 5. She found him well-written, finding him an intimidating character while feeling there was more to him than the "cold, badass villain who talks down to everyone." She discussed how he contrasted with the protagonist, namely in how they each have a different takeaway on the novel each read, with his take being more "realistic and nihilistic." She stated that what made him compelling as a villain was that he could be empathized with for his backstory and motivations, but his methods make him impossible to root for him. She also praised his English voice actor, who she felt made him charismatic, intimidating, and "awe-inspiring," as well as elevating Louis to among the best video game villains. She also considered him the best Atlus villain. Game Rant writer Matt Karoglou considered him one of the best villains among Japanese role-playing games, owing to Louis why the story of Metaphor works as well as it does. He found it a "return to form" to Persona 3 and 4 by having him be the singular villain of the story, echoing Wan's feelings on the ability to empathize with him despite him being as evil as he is. Karoglou felt that this suggested he was a deep villain, arguing that he deserved to stand among villains such as Sephiroth, Kefka, and Luca Blight. The contrast between the protagonist and Louis is part of what made him so compelling to Karoglou, who drew comparison to the contrast between Sephiroth and Final Fantasy VII protagonist Cloud, who both want to save the planet, but have different methods.

IGN writer Vitor Conceição considered Louis one of his favorite video game antagonists, discussing how he and the protagonist have similar goals with his egalitarian goals, though noting that he differs in his methods. He described him as the embodiment of evil and evocative of villains like Sephiroth from Final Fantasy VII due to their desire for achieving a common good through evil and violent methods, and praised Atlus for making an antagonist with twists and turns to his character. He also felt that he was a step above many Atlus antagonists, including the STREGA group from Persona 3. GamesRadar+ writer Oscar Taylor-Kent praised Louis, stating that he was the first "Sephiroth-level" villain for Atlus and comparing him to Sephiroth and Griffith from Berserk for his intimidation and charisma respectively. He felt that this was due to him having a constant presence through the series, something only done in the Persona series with the villain Joker from Persona 2. He particularly found that Louis and the protagonist mirrored each other particularly well compared to other attempts by Atlus in previous works. Rolling Stone writer Josh Broadwell felt that the way the game's progression is handled helped make Louis more poignant, feeling that he began the game as a "caricature" of power politics, but with time, his "cruelty and depravity" and "hypnotic" charisma help develop his character. He also discussed how, despite being "stylish [and] glamorous," he was not an "offensive play on effeminate stereotypes," commenting on him as powerful, charismatic, and a "thinly veiled indictment against modern demagoguery." RPGSite writer Josh Torres felt that Louis stood above other Atlus villains, including Takuto Maruki from Persona 5 Royal, whom he found intriguing but felt that his villainy coming to the forefront so late in the story negatively impacted him. He felt that the game gave players time to appreciate "charisma and oppressive aura," as well as create a relationship with the protagonist early.

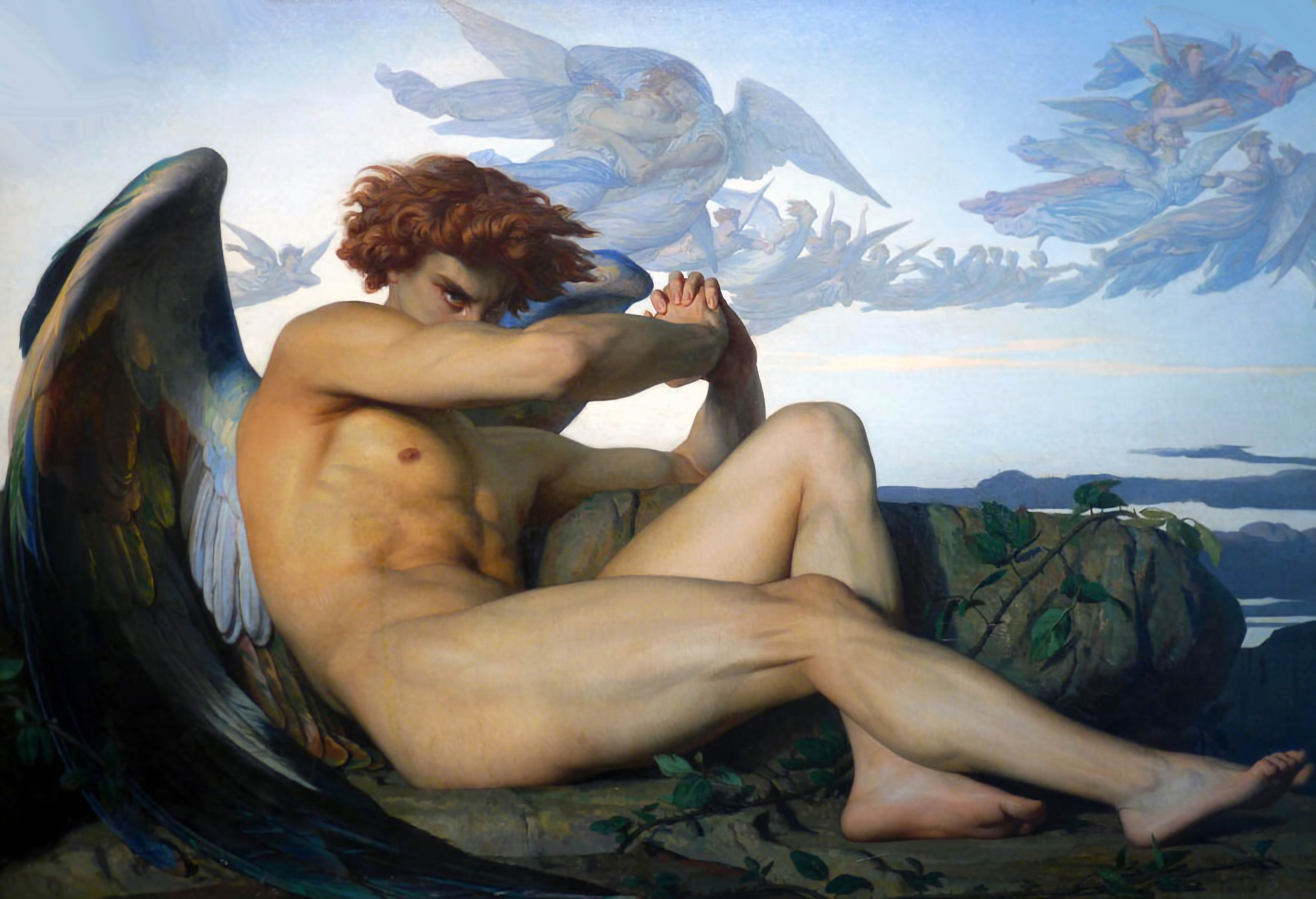
Critics have drawn comparisons between Louis and Lucifer

Louis has been compared to Lucifer, with PCGamesN writer Aaron Down calling him "positively Lucifian" particularly thanks to his horns. Down also describing him as a "juxtaposing angelic figure" to the Sanctist Church due to his "flowing golden locks and blinding white armor." He felt that Soejima was likely inspired by the characters of Reinhard from Legend of Galactic Heroes, Ryo from Devilman Crybaby, and Griffith from Berserk. He praised Louis for being a sympathetic villain despite being "pure evil" and a brutal man. Real Sound writer Chihiro Yuki suggested that the protagonist, Louis, and Forden each represented their own path, evocative of the Shin Megami Tensei series. Siliconera writer Stephanie Liu felt it strange that Louis remained as the sole main antagonist of the story, believing that he felt like a "first act boss" and that he was not a very interesting character. She also felt that the reveal that he was an elda lacked narrative weight and that the game "glosses over" this.
