= Yuichi Nakamura =

Japanese voice actor and narrator (born 1980)

- 中村 悠一
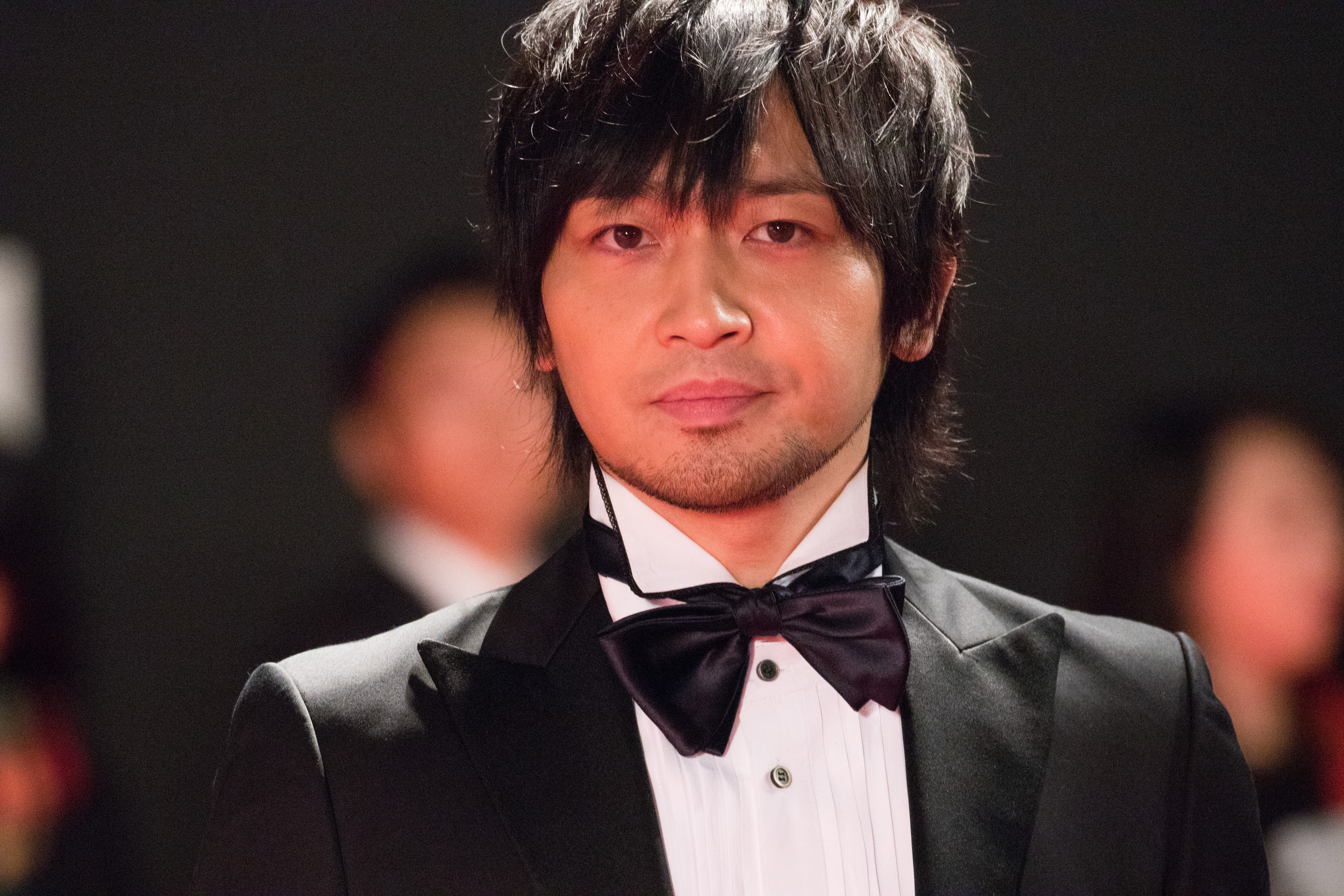
- Nakamura at the 2016 Tokyo International Film Festival
- Born: February 20, 1980 (age 46); Aji, Kagawa Prefecture, Japan
- Other names: Yuu-Kyan (ゆうきゃん, Yūkyan)
- Occupations: Voice actor; narrator
- Years active: 2001–present
- Notable work: Oreimo as Kyosuke Kosaka; JoJo's Bizarre Adventure: Golden Wind as Bruno Bucciarati; Jujutsu Kaisen as Satoru Gojo; Shugo Chara! as Ikuto Tsukuyomi; My Hero Academia as Hawks; Boruto: Naruto Next Generations as Koji Kashin; Fairy Tail as Gray Fullbuster; Witch Hat Atelier as Olruggio; Genshin Impact as Flins; Nippon Sangoku as Yasuaki Kaku; Guilty Crown as Gai Tsutsugami; The Testament of Sister New Devil as Basara Tōjō; The Irregular at Magic High School as Tatsuya Shiba; Osomatsu-san as Karamatsu Matsuno; Blazblue as Hazama and Yūki Terumi; Clannad as Tomoya Okazaki; Macross Frontier as Alto Saotome; Haikyu!! as Tetsurō Kuroo; World Trigger as Yūichi Jin; Dr. Stone as Tsukasa Shishio; Daemons of the Shadow Realm as Ryu "Dera" Tadera; Sentenced to Be a Hero as Rhyno; Fruits Basket as Sohma Shigure; Psycho-Pass 3 as Kei Mikhail Ignatov; Re:Zero – Starting Life in Another World as Reinhard Van Astrea; Hyouka as Hōtarō Oreki; Ultraman X as Ultraman X; Blue Lock as Shidou Ryusei

Yuichi Nakamura (中村 悠一, Nakamura Yūichi; born February 20, 1980) is a Japanese voice actor and narrator. He is affiliated with the agency Intention as of October 1, 2020. He is characterized by his calm and clear voice, and mainly plays roles ranging from teenage boys to men in their 30s. He has a wealth of experience in narration but has also been active in animation and dubbing in many productions, such as Gray Fullbuster in Fairy Tail, Gai Tsutsugami in Guilty Crown, Tatsuya Shiba in The Irregular at Magic High School, Karamatsu in Osomatsu-san, Graham Aker in Mobile Suit Gundam 00, Alto Saotome in Macross Frontier, Tomoya Okazaki in Clannad, Kyōsuke Kōsaka in Oreimo, Yoshiki Kishinuma in Corpse Party, Hotaro Oreki in Hyouka, Bruno Bucciarati in JoJo's Bizarre Adventure: Golden Wind, Tetsurō Kuroo in Haikyu!!, Yūichi Jin in World Trigger, Satoru Gojo in Jujutsu Kaisen, Hajime Umemiya in Wind Breaker, Tsukasa Shishio in Dr. Stone, Hawks in My Hero Academia, Shigure Sohma in Fruits Basket (2019), Shidou Ryusei in Blue Lock and Loki in One Piece. In video games, he voiced Hazama and Yūki Terumi in BlazBlue, Joon Gi Han in the Yakuza: Like A Dragon series, Sakon Shima in Sengoku Basara 4, Ryoma in Fire Emblem, Cid Raines in Final Fantasy XIII, Thancred Waters in Final Fantasy XIV, Flamebringer in Arknights, Fei Long in Street Fighter IV, and Louis Guiabern in Metaphor: ReFantazio. He has also performed the Japanese dub roles for Chris Evans in the Marvel Cinematic Universe, as well as Liam Hemsworth in The Hunger Games film series.

== Biography ==
After graduating high school, Nakamura moved to Tokyo to become a voice actor. He wanted to be a movie dubbing artist. He entered Yoyogi Animation Academy and started living in the dormitory. While enrolled, he played the role of a waiter in the drama CD Taishō Roman Zakkichō starring Takehito Koyasu. After moving on from Yoyogi Animation Academy, he worked at Production Tokyo Drama House, Toritori Office, and Sigma Seven, and is currently a member of Intention.

In 2001, he made his voice acting debut in the OVA D+VINE [LUV], and in the same year, he made his first regular TV anime role as Griffion and Ligeron in Dennō Bōkenki Webdiver. In 2006, he won the role of Rufus in the game Valkyrie Profile 2: Silmeria, and the following year in 2007, he won the role of Takaya Abe in Big Windup!. In the same year, he starred as Tomoya Okazaki in the TV anime Clannad.

In 2008, he won the 18th Best Male Voice Actor Award in Nonko and Nobita's Anime Scramble. In 2016, he was awarded the Voice Actor of the Year in the Person Category of the 3rd Yahoo! Search Awards.

In April 2020, Nakamura launched "Washagana TV" on YouTube with manga artist, Bkub Okawa, as a composition writer. As a double personality with Mafia Kajita, he uploads videos of various genres, such as unboxing, gaming, and valuable possession showcasing. He also welcomes guests for free talk, live streaming of new releases and enthusiast games, and membership-only streaming.

== Filmography ==
=== Anime series ===
Year	Title	Role	Other notes
2001	Dennou Boukenki Webdiver	Griffion, Ligaon, Raada	
2001	The Prince of Tennis	Ginka Center member 1	
2002	Princess Tutu	Male	
2003	Crush Gear Nitro	Hugo	
2003	E's Otherwise	Guerrilla, Man, Teoerrorno	
2003	Konjiki no Gash!	Tsaoron	
2003	Hoop Days	Satoru Nagase	
2004	Shura no Toki	Okita Sōji (Third division)	
2006	Gakuen Heaven	Ishizuka (secretary)	
2006	Kiba	Police B	
2006	Aria the Natural	Postal worker	
2006	Glass Fleet	Laquld	
2006	Black Lagoon	Agent Sugar, Meier	
2006	Honey and Clover II	Male Student B (ep 4), Student	
2006	Ramen Fighter Miki	Akihiko Ōta	
2006	Black Lagoon: The Second Barrage	Botrovski, Hanada (eps 21–22), Moretti, Vasilinov (ep 24)	
2006	Jigoku Shōjo Futakomori	Criminal	Episode 2
2007	Nodame Cantabile	Friend A (ep 2), Kazushi Iwai, Male student A (ep 1)	
2007	Magical Girl Lyrical Nanoha Strikers	Vice Granscenic	
2007	Kono Aozora ni Yakusoku wo: Yōkoso Tsugumi Ryō e	Wataru Hoshino	
2007	Engage Planet Kiss Dum	Syuu Nanao	
2007	Sola	Clerk A (ep 14), Teacher (eps 2, 10)	
2007	Big Windup!	Takaya Abe	
2007	Sky Girls	Homare Moriyama	
2007	Sayonara Zetsubō Sensei	Abiru's father (ep 4), Director B (ep 11), Employee (ep 6), Policeman (ep 8), White haired person (ep 9)	
2007	Ayakashi Ayashi: Ayashi Divine Comedy	Misawa Teizan	
2007	Majin Tantei Nōgami Neuro	Tetsuyuki Homura	Episode 16
2007	Mokke	Takanashi	Episode 5
2007	Clannad	Tomoya Okazaki	
2007	Shugo Chara!	Ikuto Tsukiyomi	
2007	Mobile Suit Gundam 00	Graham Aker	
2007	Prism Ark	Judas	
2007	Tokyo Marble Chocolate	Yamada	
2008	Macross Frontier	Alto Saotome	
2008	Zoku Sayonara Zetsubō Sensei	Abiru's father	Episode 3
2008	Blassreiter	Bradley Guildford	
2008	Neo Angelique Abyss	Jet	
2008	Net Ghost PiPoPa	Divine Forest	
2008	Wagaya no Oinari-sama.	Kūgen Tenko (male)	
2008	Bleach	Tesra Lindocruz	
2008	Zettai Karen Children	Kōichi Minamoto	Theme Song Performance (ED3)
2008	Clannad After Story	Tomoya Okazaki	
2008	Neo Angelique Abyss: Second Age	Jet	
2008	Linebarrels of Iron	Reiji Moritsugu	
2008	Shugo Chara!! Doki—	Ikuto Tsukiyomi	
2008	Inazuma Eleven	Koujirou Genda, Jin Kageno, Mark Kruger, Segata Ryuuichirou	
2008	Mobile Suit Gundam 00 Second Season	Mister Bushido	
2009	Basquash!	Iceman Hotty	
2009	Bleach	Muramasa	
2009	Fullmetal Alchemist: Brotherhood	Greed	
2009	Shangri-La	Leon Imaki	
2009	Zan Sayonara Zetsubō Sensei	Abiru's father	Episode 3
2009	Fairy Tail	Gray Fullbuster	
2009	Kimi ni Todoke	Ryu Sanada	
2009	Tatakau Shisho - The Book of Bantorra	Volken	
2010	Arakawa Under the Bridge	Last Samurai	
2010	Dance in the Vampire Bund	Akira Kaburagi	
2010	Durarara!!	Kyōhei Kadota	
2010	Ookiku Furikabutte ~Natsu no Taikai Hen~	Takaya Abe	
2010	Oreimo	Kyousuke Kousaka	
2010	Princess Resurrection OVA	Kizaia	
2010	Shinryaku! Ika Musume	Gorō Arashiyama	
2010	Shugo Chara Party!	Ikuto Tsukiyomi	
2010	Starry☆Sky	Kazuki Shiranui	
2010	Togainu no Chi	Tomoyuki	
2010	Zettai Karen Children OVA	Kōichi Minamoto	Theme Song Performance (ED)
2011	Bakugan: Gundalian Invaders	Captain Elright	
2011	Fairy Tail	Gray Fullbuster, Gray Surge	
2011	X-Men	Marsh	
2011	Fairy Tail OVA	Gray Fullbuster	
2011	Fate/Prototype	Archer/Gilgamesh	OVA
2011	Guilty Crown	Gai Tsutsugami	
2011	Itsuka Tenma no Kuro Usagi	Gekkou Kurenai	
2011	Kimi ni Todoke 2nd Season	Ryu Sanada	
2011	Last Exile: Fam, the Silver Wing	Sorūsh	
2011	Sekaiichi Hatsukoi	Yoshiyuki Hatori	
2011	Shinryaku!? Ika Musume	Goro Arashiyama	
2011	Starry Sky	Shiranui Kazuki	
2011	Senjou no Valkyria 3: Tagatame no Juusou	Kurt Irving	
2011	Uta no☆Prince-sama♪ Maji LOVE 1000%	Tsukimiya Ringo	
2011	Working!!	Mashiba Yohei	
2012	Aquarion Evol	Towano Mykage	
2012	Btooom!	Nobutaka Oda	
2012	GinTama	Sakata Kintoki	
2012	Hyouka	Hōtarō Oreki	
2012	Initial D Fifth Stage	Rin Hōjō	
2012	Inu × Boku SS	Sōshi Miketsukami	
2012	K	Rikio Kamamoto	
2012	La storia della Arcana Famiglia	Luca	
2012	Lagrange: The Flower of Rin-ne	Villagulio	
2012	Love, Elections & Chocolate	Yūki Ōjima	
2012	Magi: The Labyrinth of Magic	Kōen Ren	
2012	Natsuyuki Rendezvous	Ryōsuke Hazuki	
2012	Shirokuma Cafe	Grizzly	
2012	Tonari no Kaibutsu-kun	Yūzan Yoshida	
2013	Zettai Karen Children: The Unlimited	Kōichi Minamoto	
2013	Pocket Monsters Best Wishes: Season 2 - Episode N	N	
2013	Ore no Imōto ga Konna ni Kawaii Wake ga Nai.	Kyōsuke Kōsaka	
2013	Senyū	Ros	
2013	Valvrave the Liberator	Raizo Yamada	
2013	Karneval	Jiki	
2013	WataMote	Tomoki Kuroki	
2013	Uta no☆Prince-sama♪ Maji LOVE 2000%	Tsukimiya Ringo	
2013	Ketsuekigata-kun!	Type B-kun	
2013	BlazBlue: Alter Memory	Yūki Terumi/Hazama	
2013	Battle Spirits Saikyou Ginga Ultimate Zero	Rei	
2013	Log Horizon	William Massachusetts	
2013	Gundam Build Fighters	Ricardo Fellini	
2013	Corpse Party: Tortured Souls	Yoshiki Kishinuma	
2014	Monthly Girls' Nozaki-kun	Umetarō Nozaki	
2014	Fairy Tail	Gray Fullbuster	
2014	Haikyu!!	Tetsurō Kuroo	
2014	Hamatora	Ratio	
2014	Invaders of the Rokujouma!?	Kōtarō Satomi	
2014	Kenzen Robo Daimidaler	Henry	
2014	Nobunaga Concerto	Kinoshita Tōkichirō	
2014	Nobunaga The Fool	Gaius Julius Caesar	
2014	The Irregular at Magic High School	Tatsuya Shiba	
2014	Tokyo Ghoul	Renji Yomo	
2014	World Trigger	Yūichi Jin	
2014	Z/X Ignition	Mikado Kurosaki	
2014	Donten ni Warau	Tenka Kumo	
2015	Fafner in the Azure: -EXODUS-	Dustin Morgan	
2015	Tokyo Ghoul √A	Renji Yomo	
2015	The Testament of Sister New Devil	Basara Tōjō	
2015	Q Transformers: Return of the Mystery of Convoy	Sideswipe, Sunstreaker	
2015	Ketsuekigata-kun! 2	Type B-kun	
2015	World Break: Aria of Curse for a Holy Swordsman	Jin Ishurugi	
2015	Durarara!!x2 Shou	Kyōhei Kadota	
2015	Uta no☆Prince-sama♪ Maji LOVE Revolutions	Tsukimiya Ringo	
2015	Seraph of the End	Guren Ichinose	
2015	High School DxD BorN	Sairaorg Bael	
2015	Shokugeki no Soma	Kojirō Shinomiya	
2015	K: Return of Kings	Rikio Kamamoto	
2015	Ushio and Tora	Kenichi Masaki	
2015	One-Punch Man	Mumen Rider	
2015	Mr. Osomatsu	Karamatsu Matsuno	
2015	Ketsuekigata-kun! 3	Type B-kun	
2015	Durarara!!x2 Ten	Kyōhei Kadota, Voice of Ikebukuro	
2015	Haikyu!! 2	Tetsurō Kuroo	
2016	Mr. Osomatsu	Karamatsu Matsuno, Karako (eps 13, 15), Sutematsu (ep 13)	
2016	Durarara!!x2 Ketsu	Kyōhei Kadota	
2016	Dimension W	Loser	
2016	Divine Gate	Arthur	
2016	Drifters	Shimazu Toyohisa	
2016	Please Tell Me! Galko-chan	Abesen	
2016	Ketsuekigata-kun! 4	Type B-kun	
2016	Re:Zero − Starting Life in Another World	Reinhard van Astrea	
2016	Sweetness and Lightning	Kouhei Inuzuka	
2016	91 Days	Ronaldo	
2016	Berserk	Silat	
2016	Sousei no Onmyouji	Kankurou Mitosaka	
2016	Kiss Him, Not Me	Kazuma Mutsumi	
2016	WWW.Working!!	Daisuke Higashida	
2016	Poco's Udon World	Sōta Tawara	
2016	Uta no Prince-sama Maji LOVE Legend Star	Tsukimiya Ringo	
2016	Maho Girls PreCure!	Kushi	
2016	Mobile Suit Gundam Unicorn RE:0096	Nigel Garrett	
2016	March Comes in like a Lion	Takeshi Tsuji	
2016	Days	Takumi Hoshina	
2016	Sound! Euphonium 2	Masahiro Hashimoto	
2016	Loststorage incited WIXOSS	Kou Satomi	
2017	Miss Kobayashi's Dragon Maid	Makoto Takiya	
2017	Atom: The Beginning	Umatarō Tenma	
2017	Yowamushi Pedal: Next Generation	Kimitaka Koga	
2017	Fuuka	Niko	
2017	Digimon Universe: Appli Monsters	Charismon	
2017	Dive!!	Shibuki Okitsu	
2017	Inazuma Eleven: Balance of Ares	Zhao Jinyun	
2017	Knight's & Magic	Oratio Gojass	
2017	The Eccentric Family	Kureichirō Ebisugawa	
2017	Eromanga Sensei	Kotetsu Izumi	
2017	Mr. Osomatsu 2	Karamatsu Matsuno	also 2018
2017	Recovery of an MMO Junkie	Kanbe	
2017	Elegant Yokai Apartment Life	Mizuki Hase	
2018	Record of Grancrest War	Irvin	
2018	Ms. Koizumi Loves Ramen Noodles	Shū Ōsawa	
2018	Fairy Tail	Gray Fullbuster	
2018	Yowamushi Pedal: Glory Line	Kimitaka Koga	
2018	Hakata Tonkotsu Ramens	Shunsuke Saruwatari	
2018	Hakyu Hoshin Engi	Yozen	
2018	Gintama: Shirogane no Tamashii-hen	Sakata Kintoki	
2018	Killing Bites	Taiga Nakanishi	
2018	The Testament of Sister New Devil Departures	Basara Tōjō	
2018	Pop Team Epic	Popuko	Ep.5
2018	Last Hope	Sieg	
2018	Tokyo Ghoul:re	Renji Yomo	
2018	The Legend of the Galactic Heroes: Die Neue These Kaikō	Oskar von Reuenthal	
2018	Golden Kamuy	Toshizō Hijikata (young)	
2018	Tada Never Falls in Love	Mitsuyoshi Tada	
2018	Rokuhōdō Yotsuiro Biyori	Tokitaka	
2018	School Babysitters	Satoru Kumatsuka	
2018	High School DxD Hero	Sairaorg Bael	
2018	Forest of Piano	Pan Wei	also 2019
2018	Cells at Work!	Memory Cell	
2018	Hi Score Girl	Numata	
2018	Bakumatsu	Takasugi Shinsaku	
2018	JoJo's Bizarre Adventure: Golden Wind	Bruno Bucciarati	
2018	Goblin Slayer	Dwarf Shaman	
2018	Jujutsu Kaisen	Satoru Gojō	Animated Manga Preview
2018	Million Arthur	Ruro Arthur	also 2019
2019	Fruits Basket	Shigure Sohma	
2019	Afterlost	Akira	
2019	One-Punch Man 2	Mumen Rider	
2019	To the Abandoned Sacred Beasts	Cain Madhouse	
2019	Dr. Stone	Tsukasa Shishio	
2019	How Heavy Are the Dumbbells You Lift?	Jason Sgatham	
2019	Case File nº221: Kabukicho	John H. Watson	
2019	True Cooking Master Boy	Xie Lu	
2019	Psycho-Pass 3	Kei Mikhail Ignatov	
2019	Babylon	Zen Seizaki	
2019	Bakumatsu Crisis	Shinsaku Takasugi	
2019	Pocket Monsters	Dr. Sakuragi (Professor Cerise)	2019 series
2020	My Hero Academia 4	Hawks	
2020	Listeners	Tommy Walker	
2020	Fruits Basket 2nd Season	Shigure Sōma	
2020	Warlords of Sigrdrifa	Ronge	
2020	The Irregular at Magic High School: Visitor Arc	Tatsuya Shiba	
2020	Jujutsu Kaisen	Satoru Gojō	
2020	Mr. Osomatsu 3	Karamatsu Matsuno	
2020	Talentless Nana	Kyōya Onodera	
2020	Boruto: Naruto Next Generations	Koji Kashin	
2020	Bungou to Alchemist: Shinpan no Haguruma	Osamu Dazai	
2021	World Trigger 2nd Season	Yūichi Jin	
2021	True Cooking Master Boy Season 2	Xie Lu	
2021	Log Horizon: Destruction of the Round Table	William Massachusetts	
2021	My Hero Academia 5	Hawks	
2021	Shaman King	Marco Lasso	
2021	Fruits Basket: The Final	Shigure Sōma	
2021	The Honor Student at Magic High School	Tatsuya Shiba	
2021	Life Lessons with Uramichi Oniisan	Mitsuo Kumatani	
2021	Miss Kobayashi's Dragon Maid S	Makoto Takiya	
2021	Battle Game in 5 Seconds	Shin Kumagiri	
2021	Kimi to Fit Boxing	Evan	
2021	Mieruko-chan	Zen Tohno	
2021	World Trigger 3rd Season	Yūichi Jin	
2021	Kaginado	Tomoya Okazaki	
2022	The Irregular at Magic High School: Reminiscence Arc	Tatsuya Shiba	
2022	Tokyo 24th Ward	Wataru Tsukushi	
2022	Tribe Nine	Yajirobe Ueno	
2022	Fanfare of Adolescence	Kazuma Hayashida	
2022	Cardfight!! Vanguard will+Dress	Mondo Kirishima	
2022	Tokyo Mew Mew New	Ryō Shirogane	
2022	RWBY: Ice Queendom	Adam Taurus	
2022	My Hero Academia 6	Hawks	
2022	Spy × Family	Daybreak	Episode 18
2023	The Legend of Heroes: Trails of Cold Steel – Northern War	Martin S. Robinson	
2023	Endo and Kobayashi Live! The Latest on Tsundere Villainess Lieselotte	Siegwald Fitzenhagen	
2023	Reborn to Master the Blade: From Hero-King to Extraordinary Squire	Leon Olfer	
2023	Blue Lock	Ryūsei Shidō	
2023	The Legendary Hero Is Dead!	Kyle Osment	
2023	Too Cute Crisis	Amato Roy	
2023	The Marginal Service	Robin Timbert	
2023	Sacrificial Princess and the King of Beasts	Fenrir	
2023	Level 1 Demon Lord and One Room Hero	Max	
2023	Jujutsu Kaisen 2nd Season	Satoru Gojo	
2023	Firefighter Daigo: Rescuer in Orange	Sadaie Matoi	
2023	Undead Unluck	Andy	
2023	Goblin Slayer II	Dwarf Shaman	
2023	Ōoku: The Inner Chambers	Matsushima	
2023	MF Ghost	Jackson Taylor	
2023	Frieren	Sein	
2023	Rurouni Kenshin	Hiko Seijūrō	
2024	Meiji Gekken: 1874	Shizuma Origasa	
2024	Fairy Tail: 100 Years Quest	Gray Fullbuster	
2024	Mr. Villain's Day Off	Trigger	
2024	Go! Go! Loser Ranger!	Red Keeper	
2024	Wind Breaker	Hajime Umemiya	
2024	Viral Hit	Tatsuya Ōgi	
2024	My Hero Academia 7	Hawks	
2024	Urusei Yatsura	Rupa	
2024	The Elusive Samurai	Suwa Yorishige	
2024	Kinnikuman: Perfect Origin Arc	Kinnikuman Super Phoenix	
2024	Mecha-Ude	Fist	
2024	Orb: On the Movements of the Earth	Badeni	
2024	As a Reincarnated Aristocrat, I'll Use My Appraisal Skill to Rise in the World Season 2	Clamant Waitraw III	
2024	Wonderful Pretty Cure!	Daifuku Toyama	
2025	Babanba Banban Vampire	Nagayoshi Mori	
2025	To Be Hero X	Ghostblade	
2025	Lazarus	Jill	Episode 3
2025	Dekin no Mogura	Momoyuki Mogura	
2025	Clevatess	Clevatess	
2025	Mr. Osomatsu 4	Karamatsu Matsuno	
2025	Gnosia	Chipie	
2025	Let's Play	Charles Jones	
2025	My Hero Academia: Final Season	Hawks	
2026	Sentenced to Be a Hero	Rhyno	
2026	Digimon Beatbreak	Kaito Kutsuna	
2026	Jujutsu Kaisen 3rd Season	Satoru Gojo	
2026	One Piece	Loki	
2026	Daemons of the Shadow Realm	Dera	
2026	Witch Hat Atelier	Olruggio	
2026	Nippon Sangoku	Yasuaki Kaku	
2026	Fist of the North Star	Rei	
2026	The Ghost in the Shell	Togusa	
2026	Though I Am an Inept Villainess	Kou Keikou	
2026	Dark Machine: The Animation	Ajima	
2026	Suikoden: The Anime	Flik	
2026	Spirit Circle	East	
2027	Inherit the Winds	Kondō Isami	
2027	Kagurabachi	Soshiro Azami	

=== Anime films ===
Year	Title	Role	Other notes
2007	The Garden of Sinners: Overlooking View	Kouhei	Part 3
2009	Macross Frontier ~Itsuwari no Utahime~	Alto Saotome	
2010	Break Blade	Hodr	
2010	Mobile Suit Gundam 00 the Movie: A Wakening of the Trailblazer	Graham Aker	
2011	Macross Frontier ~Sayonara no Tsubasa~	Alto Saotome	
2011	Naruto Shippuden: Blood Prison	Muku	
2012	Fairy Tail the Movie: The Phoenix Priestess	Gray Fullbuster	
2012	Blood-C: The Last Dark	Iori Matsuo	
2013	Death Billiards	Man	
2014	New Initial D the Movie: Legend 1 - Awakening	Keisuke Takahashi	
2014	Tiger & Bunny: The Rising	Ryan Goldsmith	
2014	K: Missing Kings	Rikio Kamamoto	
2014	Sekai-ichi Hatsukoi: Yokozawa Takafumi no Baai	Yoshiyuki Hatori	
2016	Kingsglaive: Final Fantasy XV	Ravus Nox Fleuret	
2016	Mobile Suit Gundam Thunderbolt: December Sky	Io Fleming	
2017	Genocidal Organ	Clavis Shepherd	
2017	The Irregular at Magic High School: The Movie – The Girl Who Summons the Stars	Tatsuya Shiba	
2017	Fairy Tail the Movie: Dragon Cry	Gray Fullbuster	
2017	Mobile Suit Gundam Thunderbolt: Bandit Flower	Io Fleming	
2018	Liz and the Blue Bird	Masahiro Hashimoto	
2019	Mr. Osomatsu: The Movie	Karamatsu Matsuno	
2019	My Hero Academia: Heroes Rising	Hawks	
2020	Goblin Slayer: Goblin's Crown	Dwarf Shaman	
2020	Psycho-Pass 3: First Inspector	Kei Mikhail Ignatov	
2021	The Seven Deadly Sins: Cursed by Light	second Fairy King Dahlia	
2021	The Journey	Nizar	
2021	Jujutsu Kaisen 0	Satoru Gojo	
2022	Mr. Osomatsu: Hipipo-Zoku to Kagayaku Kajitsu	Karamatsu Matsuno	
2023	The Concierge at Hokkyoku Department Store	Tokiwa	
2023	Komada: A Whisky Family	Kei Komada	
2024	Mobile Suit Gundam SEED Freedom	Shura Serpentine	
2024	Haikyu!! The Dumpster Battle	Tetsurō Kuroo	
2024	Wonderful Pretty Cure! The Movie: A Grand Adventure in a Thrilling Game World!	Daifuku Toyama	
2025	Miss Kobayashi's Dragon Maid: A Lonely Dragon Wants to Be Loved	Makoto Takiya	
2025	Demon Slayer: Kimetsu no Yaiba – The Movie: Infinity Castle	Keizo	
2026	Armored Trooper VOTOMS: Die Graue Hexe	Fritz Gersdorf	

=== Web animation ===
Year	Title	Role
2015	Mobile Suit Gundam Thunderbolt	Io Fleming
2020	Dragon's Dogma	Ethan
2023	Record of Ragnarok II	Buddha
2024	Kimi ni Todoke 3rd Season	Ryu Sanada
2025	Koisuru One Piece	Usopp Nakatsugawa
2025	Bullet/Bullet	Batting Center Saitō

=== Live-action film ===
Year	Title	Role	Other notes
2022	Mr. Osomatsu	Karamatsu (voice)	
2024	Acma: Game: The Final Key	Elva (voice)	

=== Live-action television ===
Year	Title	Role	Other notes
2024	ACMA:GAME	Elva (voice)	

=== Tokusatsu ===
Year	Title	Role	Other notes
2011	Kaizoku Sentai Gokaiger	Deratsueigar	Ep. 11 - 12
2012	Tokumei Sentai Go-Busters	Beet J. Stag/Stag Buster	Eps. 14 - 50
2012	Tokumei Sentai Go-Busters the Movie: Protect the Tokyo Enetower!	Beet J. Stag/Stag Buster	Movie
2012	Tokumei Sentai Go-Busters vs. Beet Buster vs. J	Beet J. Stag	Special
2013	Tokumei Sentai Go-Busters vs. Kaizoku Sentai Gokaiger: The Movie	Beet J. Stag/Stag Buster, Waredonaiyer	Movie
2013	Tokumei Sentai Go-Busters Returns vs. Dōbutsu Sentai Go-Busters	Beet J. Stag/Stag Buster/Silver Stag	OV
2013	Kamen Rider × Super Sentai × Space Sheriff: Super Hero Taisen Z	Beet J. Stag	Movie
2014	Zyuden Sentai Kyoryuger vs. Go-Busters: The Great Dinosaur Battle! Farewell Our Eternal Friends	Beet J. Stag/Stag Buster	Movie
2015	Ultraman X	Ultraman X	
2016	Ultraman X The Movie	Ultraman X	Movie
2017	Ultraman Orb The Movie	Ultraman X	Movie
2020	Mashin Sentai Kiramager	Galza	
2023	Ultraman New Generation Stars	Ultraman X	Ep. 9 - 10

=== Drama CD ===
- Aitsu no Daihonmei, Takahiko Satō
- Amari Sensei no Karei na Seminar
- angelica monologue, Sakutarō Hagiwara
- Aitsu no Daihonmei, Takahiko Satou
- Barajou no Kiss, Kaede Higa
- Bokutachi to Chuuzai-san no 700-nichi Sensou, Saijō
- Cherry Boy Sakuen, Momiji Nakakita
- Corpse Party: Blood Covered, Yoshiki Kishinuma
- DeadLock, Yūto Lenix
- DeadHeat, Yūto Lenix
- DeadShot, Yūto Lenix
- Exoskull Zero, Kakugo
- Fate/Prototype Special Drama CD(Christmas Murder Case), Archer
- Fujoshi Rumi, Shunsuke Chiba
- Hitomi Wo Sumashite, Shigeto Honda
- Honto Yajuu, Tomoharu Ueda
- Kaichou wa Maid-sama, Kurotatsu
- Karneval, Jiki
- Ketsuekigata Danshi, Hibiki Akabane
- Kizuna IV, Harada
- Koi ni Inochi wo Kakeru no sa, Tōru Miwasa
- Kotoba Nante Iranai Series 1: Kotoba Nante Iranai, Keisuke Kazami
- Kotoba Nante Iranai Series 2: Iki mo Dekinai kurai, Keisuke Kazami
- Kuranoa, Shō Kitajima
- Kuro Bara Alice, Dimitri Lewandowski
- Kyuuso Ha Cheese no Yume Omiru, Kyōichi Ōtomi
- Love Neco, Yabuki Eiji
- Love Recipe ~Henna Essence~, Seiji Igarashi
- Migawari Hakushaku no Bouken, Richard Radford
- MR.MORNING, Miguel Wiseman
- Koi ni Inochi wo Kakeru no sa, Tōru Misawa
- Punch Up!, Kōta Ōki
- Repeat After Me?, Nigel Rose
- Rokujyoma no Shinryakusha!? ~Shirogane no Hime to Aoki Kishi~, Kōtarō Satomi/Reios Fatra Bertorion
- Rossellini Ke no Musuko Ryakudatsusha, Eduard Rossellini
- Ruri no Kaze ni Hana wa Nagareru, Kōya
- Scarlet, Akio Kōzuki
- Sekai-ichi Hatsukoi, Hatori Yoshiyuki
- Sentimental Garden Lover, Taki
- Seven Days: Monday - Thursday, Tōji Seryō
- S.L.H - Stray Love Hearts!, Cain Kumoide
- Soujo no Koi wa Nido Haneru, Ōtomi Kyōichi
- Starry☆Sky, Kazuki Shiranui
- Strobe Edge, Ren Ichinose
- Suikoden, Flik
- Suikoden II, Flik
- Taiyō no Ie, Hiro Nakamura
- Tindharia no Tane, Fizz Valerian
- Voice Calendar Story of 365 days, GIN·RUMMY

=== Video games ===
Year	Title	Role	Other notes	Systems
2003	Summon Night 3	Phlaiz		PlayStation 2, PlayStation Portable
2003	Tales of Symphonia	Additional Voices		GameCube, PlayStation 2, PlayStation 3, Windows
2005	Togainu no Chi	Tomoyuki		Windows, PlayStation 2, PlayStation Portable
2006	Galaxy Angel II: Zettai Ryouiki no Tobira	Hibiki		PlayStation 2
2006	Lamento - Beyond the Void -	Ul		
2006	Valkyrie Profile 2: Silmeria	Rufus		PlayStation 2
2007	Tomoyo After: It's a Wonderful Life CS Edition	Tomoya Okazaki		PlayStation 2
2007	Galaxy Angel II: Mugen Kairo no Kagi	Hibiki		PlayStation 2
2007	Jingi naki Otome	Ryū Nayuta		Windows
2008	Avalon Code	Rex/Georg		Nintendo DS
2008	BlazBlue: Calamity Trigger	Hazama/Yūki Terumi		Arcade, PlayStation 3, PlayStation Portable, Xbox 360, Windows
2008	Blazer Drive	Shiroh		Nintendo DS
2008	Corpse Party: Blood Covered	Yoshiki Kishinuma		
2008	Fushigi Yūgi: Suzaku Ibun	Tomo		PlayStation 2
2008	Lux-Pain	Akira Mido		
2008	Street Fighter IV	Fei Long		Arcade, PlayStation 3, Xbox 360, Windows, Nintendo 3DS, iOS, Android, PlayStation 4
2009	Arc Rise Fantasia	L'Arc		Nintendo Wii
2009	BlazBlue: Continuum Shift	Hazama/Yūki Terumi		Arcade, PlayStation 3, Xbox 360, Windows
2009	Bloody Call	Reimei		Windows
2009	Dear Girl ~Stories~ Hibiki, Hibiki Tokkun Daisakusen!	Ryō		Nintendo DS
2009	Daemon Bride	Asmodeus/Souya Tachibana		
2009	Final Fantasy XIII	Cid Raines		PlayStation 3, Xbox 360, Windows, iOS, Android
2009	Galaxy Angel II: Eigo Kaiki no Koku	Hibiki		PlayStation 2
2009	Himehibi -New Princess Days- Zoku! Nigakki	Ken Koizumi		PlayStation 2
2009	Luminous Arc 3: Eyes	Dhino		Nintendo DS
2009	Starry☆Sky	Kazuki Shiranui		Windows, PlayStation Portable, PlayStation Vita, Nintendo 3DS
2009	Tokimeki Memorial 4	Tadashi Nanakawa		PlayStation Portable
2010	Armen Noir	Crimson		PlayStation 2
2010	Estpolis	Maxim		
2010	Final Fantasy XIV	Male Hyuran vocal effects		Windows
2010	Kimi to Naisho no... Kyo Kara Kareshi	Kō Sakisaka		Android
2010	Last Escort: Club Katze	Rei		PlayStation 2, PlayStation Portable
2010	Estpolis: The Lands Cursed by the Gods	Maxim		Nintendo DS
2010	Renai Bancho	Tsundere Bancho		PlayStation Portable
2011	2nd Super Robot Wars Z	Alto Saotome/Graham Aker		PlayStation Portable
2011	Arcana Famiglia	Luca		PlayStation Portable
2011	Corpse Party: Book of Shadows	Yoshiki Kishinuma		PlayStation Portable, iOS
2011	Final Fantasy Type-0	Trey		PlayStation Portable
2011	Initial D Arcade Stage 6 AA	Rin Hōjō		Arcade
2011	Uta no Prince-Sama: Sweet Serenade	Tsukimiya Ringo		PlayStation Portable
2011	Uta no Prince-Sama: Repeat	Tsukimiya Ringo		PlayStation Portable
2011	Valkyria Chronicles III	Kurt Irving		PlayStation Portable
2012	2nd Super Robot Wars Original Generation	Joshua Radcliff		PlayStation 3
2012	Fate Holy Grail Hot Springs War	Archer		
2012	BlazBlue: Chrono Phantasma	Hazama/Yūki Terumi		Arcade, PlayStation 3, PlayStation Vita, Windows
2012	Chaos Rings II	Darwin Allecker		iOS, Android, PlayStation Vita
2012	Corpse Party 2U: Hysteric Birthday	Yoshiki Kishinuma		PlayStation Portable
2012	Initial D Arcade Stage 7 AAX	Rin Hōjō		Arcade
2012	Project X Zone	Kurt Irving		Nintendo 3DS
2013	Final Fantasy XIV: A Realm Reborn	Thancred Waters		Windows, PlayStation 3, PlayStation 4, PlayStation 5, macOS
2013	JoJo's Bizarre Adventure: All-Star Battle	Narciso Anasui		PlayStation 3
2013	Lightning Returns: Final Fantasy XIII	Cid Raines		PlayStation 3, Xbox 360, Windows, iOS, Android
2013	Mind Zero	Leo Asahina		PlayStation Vita, Windows
2013	Super Robot Wars UX	Reiji Moritsugu, Alto Saotome, Graham Aker		Nintendo 3DS
2014	Corpse Party: BloodDrive	Yoshiki Kishinuma		PlayStation Vita
2014	Initial D Arcade Stage 8 Infinity	Rin Hōjō		Arcade
2014	Sengoku Basara 4	Shima Sakon		PlayStation 3, PlayStation 4
2014	Shining Resonance	Lesti Sera Alma		PlayStation 3
2015	BlazBlue: Central Fiction	Hazama/Yūki Terumi		Arcade, PlayStation 3, PlayStation 4
2015	7th Dragon III Code: VFD	Player (Male), Yuma		Nintendo 3DS
2015	The Great Ace Attorney: Adventures	Kazuma Asougi		Nintendo 3DS
2015	Dragon's Dogma Online	Male Pawn		PlayStation 3, PlayStation 4, Windows
2015	Final Fantasy Type-0 HD	Trey		Windows, PlayStation 4, Xbox One
2015	Fire Emblem Fates	Ryoma		Nintendo 3DS
2015	Fate/Grand Order	David		
2015	JoJo's Bizarre Adventure: Eyes of Heaven	Narciso Anasui		PlayStation 3, PlayStation 4
2015	Phantasy Star Online 2	Erdem Sacred		Windows, PlayStation Vita, iOS, Android, PlayStation 4
2015	Super Smash Bros. for Nintendo 3DS and Wii U	Ryoma	Corrin's trailer	Wii U, Nintendo 3DS
2015	Tokyo Mirage Sessions ♯FE	Barry Goodman		Wii U
2015	Ultraman Fusion Fight!	Ultraman X		Arcade
2015	Xenoblade Chronicles X	Gwin		Wii U
2016	Final Fantasy XV	Ravus Nox Fleuret		PlayStation 4, Xbox One
2016	Granblue Fantasy	Romeo, Tsubasa		iOS, Android, Web Browser
2016	Star Ocean: Integrity and Faithlessness	Victor Oakville		PlayStation 3, PlayStation 4
2016	Yakuza 6: The Song of Life	Joon-Gi Han		PlayStation 4
2016	Bungo and Alchemist	Osamu Dazai		Web browser, Android, iOS
2017	The Great Ace Attorney 2: Resolve	Kazuma Asougi		Nintendo 3DS
2017	Fire Emblem Heroes	Ryoma, Lyon		iOS, Android
2017	Fire Emblem Warriors	Ryoma		Nintendo Switch, New Nintendo 3DS
2017	Onmyōji	Shirodōji		iOS, Android
2017	Shin Megami Tensei: Strange Journey Redux	George		Nintendo 3DS
2017	Xenoblade Chronicles 2	Malos		Nintendo Switch
2017	Digimon Story: Cyber Sleuth – Hacker's Memory	Ryuji Mishima		PlayStation 4, PlayStation Vita
2018	BlazBlue: Cross Tag Battle	Hazama		PlayStation 4, Nintendo Switch, Windows
2018	PopoloCrois Story Narcia's Tears and the Fairy's Flute	Coco Donperio (Don)		iOS, Android
2018	Dragalia Lost	Joe, Xander		iOS, Android
2018	Fist of the North Star: Lost Paradise	Taruga		PlayStation 4
2018	Fitness Boxing	Evan		Nintendo Switch
2018	Daedalus: The Awakening of Golden Jazz	Jinguji Saburo		PlayStation 4, Nintendo Switch, Windows
2019	Chocobo's Mystery Dungeon: Every Buddy!	Cid		Nintendo Switch
2019	Arknights	Flamebringer		iOS, Android
2019	JoJo's Bizarre Adventure: Last Survivor	Bruno Bucciarati		Arcade
2020	Yakuza: Like a Dragon	Yeonsu Kim (Joon-gi Han's double)		PlayStation 4
2020	Fitness Boxing 2: Rhythm and Exercise	Evan		Nintendo Switch
2020	Lord of Heroes	Johan Talede		iOS, Android, PC (onestore)
2021	Alchemy Stars	Constantine, Sinsa		iOS, Android
2021	Sin Chronicle	Gunther		iOS, Android
2021	Super Robot Wars 30	Caruleum Vaull		PlayStation 4, Nintendo Switch, Windows
2021	IDOLiSH7	Rintaro Okazaki		
2022	Triangle Strategy	Roland Glenbrook		Nintendo Switch
2022	JoJo's Bizarre Adventure: All Star Battle R	Bruno Bucciarati		PlayStation 4, PlayStation 5, Xbox One, Xbox Series X/S, Nintendo Switch, Windows
2022	Soul Hackers 2	Iron Mask		PlayStation 4, PlayStation 5, Xbox One, Xbox Series X/S, Windows, iOS, Android
2022	Tactics Ogre: Reborn	Canophus Wolph		PlayStation 4, PlayStation 5, Nintendo Switch, Windows
2023	Final Fantasy XVI	Dion Lesage		PlayStation 5
2023	Goblin Slayer Another Adventurer: Nightmare Feast	Dwarf Shaman		
2024	Jujutsu Kaisen: Cursed Clash	Satoru Gojo		Nintendo Switch, PlayStation 4, PlayStation 5, Windows, Xbox One, Xbox Series X/S
2024	Like a Dragon: Infinite Wealth	Yeonsu Kim (Joon-gi Han's double)		PlayStation 4, PlayStation 5, Windows, Xbox One, Xbox Series X/S
2024	Metaphor: ReFantazio	Louis Guiabern		PlayStation 4, PlayStation 5, Xbox Series X/S, Windows
2024	The Seven Deadly Sins: Grand Cross	Loki		iOS, Android
2024	Wizardry Variants Daphne	Additional Voices including Albano		iOS, Android, Windows
2025	Fatal Fury: City of the Wolves	Kain R. Heinlein		PlayStation 4, PlayStation 5, Xbox Series X/S, Windows
2025	Genshin Impact	Kyryll Chudomirovich Flins		iOS, Android, PlayStation 4, PlayStation 5, Xbox Series X/S, Windows
2025	Chaos Zero Nightmare	Hugo		iOS, Android, Windows
2025	Inazuma Eleven: Victory Road	Masashi Shinano		Nintendo Switch, Nintendo Switch 2, PlayStation 4, PlayStation 5, Xbox Series X/S, Windows
2026	Marvel Tokon: Fighting Souls	Captain America		PlayStation 5, Windows
2026	Neverness to Everness	Baicang		iOS, Android, PlayStation 5, Windows
2026	Arknights: Endfield	Argent Flow		iOS, Android, PlayStation 5, Windows

Unknown date

- Fate/stay night Réalta Nua: Take Off! Super Dimensional Trouble Hanafuda Epic Battle, Archer
- Last Escort -Club Katze-, Rei,
- ~miyako~, Seimei
- Shitsuji Tachino Ren'ai Jijou, Wolfgang Leinsdorf
- Konjiki no Gash Bell!!, Tsaoron

== Dubbing roles ==
=== Live-action ===
Title	Role	Dubbing actor	Other notes, sources
Captain America: The First Avenger	Steve Rogers/Captain America	Chris Evans	
The Avengers	Steve Rogers/Captain America	Chris Evans	
Thor: The Dark World	Steve Rogers/Captain America	Chris Evans	
Captain America: The Winter Soldier	Steve Rogers/Captain America	Chris Evans	
Avengers: Age of Ultron	Steve Rogers/Captain America	Chris Evans	
Ant-Man	Steve Rogers/Captain America	Chris Evans	
Captain America: Civil War	Steve Rogers/Captain America	Chris Evans	
Spider-Man: Homecoming	Steve Rogers/Captain America	Chris Evans	
Avengers: Infinity War	Steve Rogers/Captain America	Chris Evans	
Avengers: Endgame	Steve Rogers/Captain America	Chris Evans	
Avengers: Doomsday	Steve Rogers	Chris Evans	
Knives Out	Hugh Ransom Drysdale	Chris Evans	
The Gray Man	Lloyd Hansen	Chris Evans	
Red One	Jack O'Malley	Chris Evans	
The Last Song	Will	Liam Hemsworth	
The Hunger Games	Gale Hawthorne	Liam Hemsworth	
The Hunger Games: Catching Fire	Gale Hawthorne	Liam Hemsworth	
The Hunger Games: Mockingjay – Part 1	Gale Hawthorne	Liam Hemsworth	
The Hunger Games: Mockingjay – Part 2	Gale Hawthorne	Liam Hemsworth	
The Age of Shadows	Kim Woo-jin	Gong Yoo	
Aquaman	Orm Marius	Patrick Wilson	
Aquaman and the Lost Kingdom	Orm Marius	Patrick Wilson	
CSI: Miami	Patrick	Austin Nichols	
Crouching Tiger, Hidden Dragon: Sword of Destiny	Wei-Fang	Harry Shum, Jr.	
Dark Places	Lyle Wirth	Nicholas Hoult	
Deadpool 2	Gaveedra-Seven / Shatterstar	Lewis Tan	
Deadpool & Wolverine	Gaveedra-Seven / Shatterstar	Lewis Tan	
Death on the Nile	Bouc	Tom Bateman	
Dolittle	Yoshi	John Cena	
Dungeons & Dragons: Honor Among Thieves	Xenk the Paladin	Regé-Jean Page	
Evil Dead	David Allen	Shiloh Fernandez	
F9	Jakob Toretto	John Cena	
Fast X	Jakob Toretto	John Cena	
Game of Thrones	Euron Greyjoy	Pilou Asbæk	
Game of Thrones	Young Eddard Stark	Robert Aramayo	
Gods of Egypt	Horus	Nikolaj Coster-Waldau	
Hotel Rwanda	Gregoire	Tony Kgoroge	
Indiana Jones and the Dial of Destiny	Klaber	Boyd Holbrook	
Jesse Stone: Death in Paradise	Hooker Royce	Matt Barr	
Johnny English Strikes Again	Jason Volta	Jake Lacy	
Kingsman: The Golden Circle	Tequila	Channing Tatum	
The Last Adventure	Manu Borelli	Alain Delon	2025 BS10 Star Channel edition
Mad Max: Fury Road	Nux	Nicholas Hoult	
Mars	Javier Delgado	Alberto Ammann	
The Matrix Resurrections	Smith	Jonathan Groff	
Mickey 17	Timo	Steven Yeun	
Monster Hunter	Steeler	Josh Helman	
Morbius	Dr. Michael Morbius	Jared Leto	
The Mummy	Sergeant Chris Vail	Jake Johnson	
Murder on the Orient Express	Bouc	Tom Bateman	
The Musketeers	Aramis	Santiago Cabrera	
Nurse Jackie	Fitch Cooper	Peter Facinelli	
Only Murders in the Building	Oscar Torres	Aaron Dominguez	
Pacific Rim Uprising	Jake Pentecost	John Boyega	
Pennyworth	Alfred Pennyworth	Jack Bannon	
Purple Noon	Tom Ripley	Alain Delon	2016 Star Channel edition
Running Wild with Bear Grylls	Channing Tatum		
Sonic the Hedgehog	Tom Wachowski	James Marsden	
Sonic the Hedgehog 2	Tom Wachowski	James Marsden	
Sonic the Hedgehog 3		James Marsden	
The Three Musketeers	Duke of Buckingham	Orlando Bloom	
Timeless	Wyatt Logan	Matt Lanter	
Tomb Raider	Lu Ren	Daniel Wu	
Top Gun: Maverick	Jake "Hangman" Seresin	Glen Powell	
Train to Busan	Seok-woo	Gong Yoo	
Zombieland: Double Tap	Columbus	Jesse Eisenberg	

=== Animation ===
Title	Role	Other notes, sources
All Saints Street	Nick	
DC League of Super-Pets	Mark	
Inside Out 2	Lance Slashblade	
The Lord of the Rings: The War of the Rohirrim	Fréaláf Hildeson	
Love, Death & Robots	Steve	
My Little Pony: Friendship Is Magic	Garble	
The Queen's Corgi	Rex	
RWBY	Adam Taurus	
Spider-Man: Into the Spider-Verse	Peter Parker's Spider-Man	
Teenage Mutant Ninja Turtles: Mutant Mayhem	Rocksteady	
Transformers: Adventure	Steeljaw	
Transformers One	Orion Pax / Optimus Prime	
Walking with Dinosaurs	Alex	
What If...?	Captain America / Steve Rogers	

== Awards ==
Year	Award	Category	Work	Result	Ref.
2021	5th Crunchyroll Anime Awards	Best Voice Artist Performance (Japanese)	Satoru Gojo (Jujutsu Kaisen)	Nominated	
2024	8th Crunchyroll Anime Awards	Best Voice Artist Performance (Japanese)	Satoru Gojo (Jujutsu Kaisen Season 2)	Won	
