= Tsutaya Comic Award =

Japanese manga awards

Tsutaya Comic Award みんなが選ぶTSUTAYAコミック大賞
- Awarded for: Manga
- Country: Japan
- First award: 2017
- Website: tsutaya.tsite.jp/feature/book/campaign/comic-awards/index

Tsutaya Comic Award (みんなが選ぶTSUTAYAコミック大賞, Minna ga Erabu Tsutaya Comikku Taishō) is a manga award sponsored by Tsutaya, a major chain of rental and sales stores for books, music software, and video software.

== Overview ==
The first award was held in 2017 as a celebration of Tsutaya stores, until 2018 the awards were divided into 4 categories (Next Break, All time best, Anime hope, Live action hope). From the 3rd award in 2019 onwards only "Next Break" was available. The concept of the award is to decide the Next Break not by nomination or recommendation, but only by user vote. For the Next Break, the conditions are that the work must be within 5 volumes and unfinished.

== Winners and candidates ==
=== 2017 ===
Next Break
Title	Author	Publisher	Result
The Promised Neverland	Kaiu Shirai and Posuka Demizu	Shueisha	Grand Prize
Devils' Line	Ryo Hanada	Kodansha	2nd place
Bōkyaku no Sachiko	Jun Abe	Shogakukan	3rd place

All-Time Best
Title	Author	Publisher	Result
Kingdom	Yasuhisa Hara	Shueisha	Grand Prize
Slam Dunk	Takehiko Inoue	Shueisha	2nd place
Fullmetal Alchemist	Hiromu Arakawa	Square Enix	3rd place

Anime Hope
Title	Author	Publisher	Result
Kono Oto Tomare! Sounds of Life	Amyu	Shueisha	Grand Prize
Golden Kamuy	Satoru Noda	Shueisha	2nd place
Demon Slayer: Kimetsu no Yaiba	Koyoharu Gotouge	Shueisha	3rd place

Live-Action hope
Title	Author	Publisher	Result
Tokusatsu Gagaga	Niwa Tanba	Shogakukan	Grand Prize
Sensei Kunshu	Momoko Koda	Shueisha	2nd place
Cheeky Brat	Miyuki bee	Hakusensha	3rd place

==== Notes ====
- Voting period: April 17 - May 21, 2017.
- Announcement date: June 15, 2017.

=== 2018 ===
Next Break
Title	Author	Publisher	Result
Blue Period	Tsubasa Yamaguchi	Kodansha	Grand Prize
Koko wa Ima kara Rinri Desu	Shiori Amase	Shueisha	2nd place
Our Precious Conversations	Robico	Kodansha	3rd place
Nagi no Oitoma	Misato Konari	Akita Shoten	4th place

All-Time Best
Title	Author	Publisher	Result
Kingdom	Yasuhisa Hara	Shueisha	Grand Prize
One Piece	Eiichiro Oda	Shueisha	2nd place
The Promised Neverland	Kaiu Shirai and Posuka Demizu	Shueisha	3rd place
No Matter How I Look at It, It's You Guys' Fault I'm Not Popular!	Nico Tanigawa	Square Enix	4th place

Sports manga section
Title	Author	Publisher	Result
Haikyu!!	Haruichi Furudate	Shueisha	Grand Prize
Slam Dunk	Takehiko Inoue	Shueisha	2nd place
Be Blues!	Motoyuki Tanaka	Shogakukan	3rd place
Welcome to the Ballroom	Tomo Takeuchi	Kodansha	4th place

Gourmand manga section
Title	Author	Publisher	Result
Food Wars!: Shokugeki no Soma	Shun Saeki	Shueisha	Grand Prize
Papa and Daddy's Home Cooking	Yuu Toyota	Shinchosha	2nd place
What Did You Eat Yesterday?	Fumi Yoshinaga	Kodansha	3rd place
Sweetness and Lightning	Gido Amagakure	Kodansha	4th place

==== Notes ====
- Voting period: May 18 - June 10, 2018.
- Announcement date: July 16, 2018.

=== 2019 ===
Next Break
Title	Author	Publisher	Result
Jujutsu Kaisen	Gege Akutami	Shueisha	Grand Prize
Sweat and Soap	Kintetsu Yamada	Kodansha	2nd place
Sake to Koi ni wa Yotte Shikarubeki	Mayumi Eguchi, Haruko	Akita Shoten	3rd place
A Story to Keep You from Dying	Toriko Gin	Akita Shoten	4th place
The Way of the Househusband	Kousuke Oono	Shinchosha	5th place
Ranking of Kings	Sosuke Toka	Enterbrain	6th place
Act-Age	Tatsuya Matsuki, Shiro Usazaki	Shueisha	7th place
Go with the Clouds, North by Northwest	Aki Irie	Enterbrain	8th place
Chainsaw Man	Tatsuki Fujimoto	Shueisha	9th place
Not Your Idol	Aoi Makino	Shueisha	10th place

==== Notes ====
- Voting period: May 17 - June 9, 2019.
- Announcement date: July 18, 2019.

=== 2020 ===
Next Break
Title	Author	Publisher	Result
Spy × Family	Tatsuya Endo	Shueisha	Grand Prize
A Man and His Cat	Umi Sakurai	Square Enix	2nd place
My New Boss Is Goofy	Dan Ichikawa	Akita Shoten	3rd place
The Dangers in My Heart	Norio Sakurai	Akita Shoten	4th place
The Way of the Househusband	Kousuke Oono	Shinchosha	5th place
My Dress-Up Darling	Shinichi Fukuda	Square Enix	6th place
Mieruko-chan	Tomoki Izumi	Kadokawa Shoten	7th place
Anjo the Mischievous Gal	Yūichi Katō	Shōnen Gahōsha	8th place
Shikimori's Not Just a Cutie	Keigo Maki	Kodansha	9th place
Call of the Night	Kotoyama	Shogakukan	10th place

==== Notes ====
- Voting period: April 1 - May 17, 2020
- Announcement date: June 17, 2020.

=== 2021 ===
Next Break
Title	Author	Publisher	Result
The Dangers in My Heart	Norio Sakurai	Akita Shoten	Grand Prize
Kaiju No. 8	Naoya Matsumoto	Shueisha	2nd place
Oshi no Ko	Aka Akasaka and Mengo Yokoyari	Shueisha	3rd place
Shangri-La Frontier	Katarina	Kodansha	4th place
Frieren	Kanehito Yamada and Tsukasa Abe	Shogakukan	5th place
My Love Story with Yamada-kun at Lv999	Mashiro	Kadokawa	6th place
Undead Unluck	Yoshifumi Tozuka	Shueisha	7th place
Mashle	Hajime Komoto	Shueisha	8th place
Medalist	Ikada Tsuruma	Kodansha	9th place
Mieruko-chan	Tomoki Izumi	Kadokawa Shoten	10th place

==== Notes ====
- Voting period: April 1 - May 17, 2021
- Announcement date: June 15, 2021.

=== 2022 ===
Next Break
Title	Author	Publisher	Result
My Love Story with Yamada-kun at Lv999	Mashiro	Kadokawa	Grand Prize
The Fragrant Flower Blooms with Dignity	Saka Mikami	Kodansha	2nd place
Medalist	Ikada Tsuruma	Kodansha	3rd place
Dandadan	Yukinobu Tatsu	Shueisha	4th place
How I Attended an All-Guy's Mixer	Nana Aokawa	Square Enix	5th place
Takopi's Original Sin	Taizan 5	Shueisha	6th place
Omae, Tanuki ni Naranē ka?	Tomo Nagawa	Ichijinsha	7th place
Ultra-Fem Shishihara-kun	Mii Aimai	ComicSmart	8th place
I'm in Love with the Villainess	Inori, Hanagata	Ichijinsha	9th place
Blue Box	Kōji Miura	Shueisha	10th place

==== Notes ====
- Voting period: April 1 - May 17, 2022
- Announcement date: June 15, 2022.

=== 2023 ===
Next Break
Title	Author	Publisher	Result
Daemons of the Shadow Realm	Hiromu Arakawa	Square Enix	Grand Prize
From Old Country Bumpkin to Master Swordsman	Shigeru Sagasaki, Kazuki Satō	Akita Shoten	2nd Place
The Ogre's Bride	Kureha, Jun Togashi	Starts Publishing	3rd Place
Smoking Behind the Supermarket with You	Jinushi	Square Enix	4th Place
Firefly Wedding	Oreco Tachibana	Shogakukan	5th Place
You and I Are Polar Opposites	Kocha Agasawa	Shueisha	6th Place
The Summer Hikaru Died	Mokumokuren	Kadokawa	7th Place
Kindergarten Wars	You Chiba	Shueisha	8th Place
Haru no Arashi to Monster	Miyuki Mitsubachi	Hakusensha	9th Place
Gokurakugai	Yuto Sano	Shueisha	10th Place

==== Notes ====
- Voting period: July 10 – August 20, 2023
- Announcement date: September 27, 2023
