= List of My Little Monster episodes =

- Cover of the seventh and final Limited Edition Blu-ray volume released by Aniplex in Japan on May 22, 2013.
- No. of episodes: 13 + 1 OAD

Release
- Original network: TV Tokyo
- Original release: October 2 – December 25, 2012

My Little Monster is a 2012 romantic comedy Japanese anime based on the manga written and illustrated by Robico. The story follows the relationship between Haru Yoshida, a cheerful and seemingly delinquent boy and Shizuku Mizutani, a socially awkward girl who devotes herself to obtaining academic success.

The anime is produced by Brain's Base and directed by Hiro Kaburaki, along with series composition by Noboru Takagi, character designs by Tomohiro Kishi, art direction by Chikako Shibata and soundtrack music by Masato Nakayama. The series premiered on TV Tokyo on October 2, 2012, with later airings on TVO, TVh, TSC, TVA and TVQ. The series was picked up by Crunchyroll for online simulcast streaming in North America and other select parts of the world. The thirteen episode series was followed by an OAD episode on August 12, 2013. Aniplex released the series in Japan on seven Blu-ray and DVD volumes starting on November 21, 2012. NIS America licensed the series for release in North America.

The opening theme is "Q&A Recital!" (Q&Aリサイタル！) by Haruka Tomatsu and the ending theme is "White Wishes" by 9nine.

== Episode list ==
No.	Official English title (Note: All English titles are taken from Crunchyroll.) Original Japanese title	Original release date (Note: As My Little Monster premiered in TV Tokyo's Thursday 25:35 (01:25 am JST) time slot, the episodes technically aired the days following the ones listed.)	Refs.
1	"Sitting Next to Yoshida-kun"; Transliteration: "Tonari no Yoshida-kun" (Japanese: となりの吉田くん)	October 2, 2012	
Shizuku Mizutani is tasked with delivering classwork to Haru Yoshida's house. Haru sees this as something only a friend would do and declares that they are friends. Their teacher, Saeko, tries to get Shizuku to persuade Haru to stop skipping school or else he would be expelled. Haru's punk friends take advantage of his sincerity but Shizuku reveals the truth to Haru. He then confesses loving her. Haru eventually returns to school, where his inability to distinguish social protocols causes a wave of bizarre actions. Shizuku has a flashback of Haru being the top-ranked student before he was suspended. She then deems him her rival and studies hard, eventually placing 1st in midterms. Later, she agrees to go out to eat with him. On their way, Haru casually kisses her, leaving her stunned.
2	"Weird"; Transliteration: "Hen" (Japanese: 変)	October 9, 2012	
Shizuku and Haru go to the monjayaki restaurant he has wanted to go to for a while, where Shizuku eats frantically to distract herself from Haru's kiss. The next day, Haru finds a stray rooster and decides to let someone adopt it. A girl named Asako Natsume asks Shizuku to tutor her for her makeup exam since a failure would mean her remedial class would clash with an offline meet-up with her internet community. Haru decides to tutor Asako in exchange for taking him along to the meetup. A boy named Sasahara agrees to care for the rooster. Shizuku eventually tutors Asako after she fails to understand anything Haru taught her and passes the exam, but Haru ruins the meet-up by starting a fight there. Later, Haru and Shizuku sit on the school roof, causing the latter to miss class for the first time. As Shizuku thinks about how Haru has changed her, she confesses to Haru that she loves him. In the epilogue, it is revealed that Asako offers occult help on love to the internet community.
3	"Nuisance"; Transliteration: "Yakkai" (Japanese: やっかい)	October 16, 2012	
Still on the rooftop, Shizuku realizes what she just confessed and quickly says that she doesn't have feelings for Haru, who claims he is happy either way. Haru, Asako and Sasayan get permission from the school to keep the rooster in school after Sasayan's cat makes it impossible for him to take care of the rooster at home. The three of them and Shizuku decide to build a chicken coop for the rooster. Haru's punk friends join in and everyone helps complete the coop. While walking home together, Haru says that only good things have happened to him ever since he met Shizuku. She confesses that she really has fallen in love with him, but Haru counters that his love for her may be different. Haru receives a text from his cousin Mitsuyoshi that Yuzan is coming to see him, and he promptly asks Shizuku to spend the night at her home.
4	"Summer Break"; Transliteration: "Natsu bureiku" (Japanese: 夏ブレイク)	October 23, 2012	
With most people at school still afraid of Haru, Shizuku advises him to stop constantly glaring at them. Haru changes his personality by smiling and even offering others help. Soon, the girls at school become infatuated with him and he becomes popular, causing Shizuku to feel jealousy for the first time. Haru's popularity is short-lived when he beats up an upperclassman who was picking on a timid girl, Chizuru Ōshima. Haru begins to doubt whether he is doing the right thing by violently standing up for people and Shizuku says that they will eventually see him as a kind person. Following the start of summer, the group goes for a trip in the mountains, and upon returning, meet Haru's brother Yuzan. Due to Haru's strained relationship with Yuzan, Shizuku realizes that she still has a lot to learn about him.
5	"Yoshida Family Matters"; Transliteration: "Yoshida-kun Chi no Jijō" (Japanese: 吉田くんちの事情)	October 30, 2012	
Shizuku shows an interest in learning more about Haru's past, and when Yuzan meets her after school, she takes the opportunity. Yuzan explains that their father had kicked Haru out of their home around middle school but had a change of heart and now wants Haru to come home. Yuzan tells Haru that he wants Haru to stay in school even if it is only because of Shizuku. Shizuku tells Haru that she would be sad if he left. Haru tells her that he chooses to be with her. Shizuku reflects on how much her life has changed since she met Haru. The class representative from Class A, Chizuru, thanks Haru for standing up for her. Shizuku notices the way Chizuru blushes when speaking to Haru.
6	"Girls Feeling Melancholy"; Transliteration: "Kanojo-tachi no Yūutsu na Hibi" (Japanese: 彼女達の憂鬱な日々)	November 6, 2012	
Shizuku realizes that the more she spends thinking about Haru, the more her grades suffer, to the extent where she places 29th in the mock exams. Chizuru struggles with her feelings over Haru and her troubles of being an introvert. She and Haru talk about her inability to make friends. The group tries to plan strategies on how she can be more sociable. Haru and Shizuku then have a fight, which results in Shizuku ignoring him. Chizuru notes how Shizuku doesn't mind being alone. Shizuku explains her reasons for avoiding Haru, which Chizuru then relays to Haru in an outburst, surprising everyone. Haru eventually takes Shizuku on a date to the library, where she says she no longer has feelings for him. Asako, upon learning of their date, becomes sad because of Shizuku's unwillingness to share her experiences.
7	"The Distance Between Us"; Transliteration: "Futari no Kyori" (Japanese: ２人の距離)	November 13, 2012	
Haru has flashbacks from his time with his Aunt Kyoko, when she tried to reach out to him. Haru's constant smothering leads Shizuku to demand her personal space. Asako adds that being touched by someone she doesn't like is the most repulsive thing to a girl. Chizuru reveals to Haru that Shizuku worries about him. On her way to obtain the results from a mock exam, Shizuku talks with Kenji about her personal priorities, to which she chooses schoolwork over Haru. Haru admits his feelings once again and almost kisses Shizuku, but stops himself, remembering Asako's words. Shizuku flees, as she still has feelings for Haru, despite her attempts to control her emotions.
8	"Come Down to Syoyo Festival!"; Transliteration: "Oidemase! Shōyōsai" (Japanese: おいでませ！松楊祭)	November 20, 2012	
Haru gets upset when he sees Kenji with Shizuku. He goes to punch Kenji but misses and hits Shizuku instead. Shizuku opens up to Asako about Haru but when Asako offers advice, Shizuku coldly pushes her away. While walking together, Kenji explains Shizuku is partly at fault for not being honest with herself about her feelings and hurting Haru. Just then, he grabs Shizuku and hides in an empty room to avoid Yuzan. Haru enters the room with Chizuru, also avoiding Yuzan. The truth behind Kenji's words are revealed when they hear Haru and Chizuru discussing his pain with Shizuku. Just then, Yuzan walks in, and Haru holds Chizuru threateningly in front of him, but stops himself when he realizes that people are watching. Shizuku and Haru admit their mistakes to each other but decide to correct them, so Shizuku apologizes to Asako. Shizuku admits to Haru that she was afraid that if she let herself love Haru, her grades would suffer. She asks him for time to think about their relationship, and he agrees.
9	"All or Nothing"; Transliteration: "Zero to Ichi" (Japanese: ０と１)	November 27, 2012	
A month since the school festival, Shizuku's father's convenience store goes under for the 6th time which upsets her. However, she is able to calmly assess the situation. Her father remarks that due to her mother constantly working she grew up alone which resulted in her psyche not being able to manifest emotions. Haru, Sasayan and Asako get together for a study group where Shizuku realizes that she hasn't spent anytime thinking about her relationship with Haru. After Haru hears the story of how Shizuku never got any goldfish to care for, he spends his time at the river hoping to catch crayfish for her instead. At the library Shizuku encounters Kenji, where she gets him to explain her priorities in a straightforward manner. Meanwhile, at the bakery where Asako and Sasayan are studying, Asako feels discomfort when some girls enter and trash talk about her within earshot. However Mitsuyoshi, is able to make them leave, which causes Asako to become infatuated with him. Later on, the group meets Haru at the river and just as they leave Haru encounters Kenji, who returns Shizuku's pencil. Haru questions him on his feelings for Shizuku to which he replies by asking Haru if that would inconvenience him. In the epilogue it is revealed that Asako was accepted into the school by an unorthodox means.
10	"Christmas"; Transliteration: "Kurisumasu" (Japanese: クリスマス)	December 4, 2012	
Asako plans a surprise Christmas party to be held at Mitsuyoshi's batting cages however the surprise is spoilt when Shizuku confronts her. On their way to buy food for the party, Haru's punk friends invite themselves along with Kenji. The party turns out to be not quite what Asako intended but everyone seemed to enjoy themselves although Haru is now caught in a love triangle with Shizuku, Chizuru, and Kenji. Sasayan also makes note of Asako's infatuation with Mitsuyoshi which disappoints him somewhat. While outside, Haru threateningly tells Kenji to stay away from Shizuku, however he refuses; even questioning why he fell for her in the first place. Later when Haru walks Shizuku home they talk about an analogy for their relationship in the form of Ryūnosuke Akutagawa's story, The Spider's Thread. At the end, Haru admits that he is jealous of Shizuku attending winter Juku with Kenji, but after months of thought, and Kenji's advice, she finally confesses to Haru that he shouldn't worry because she does indeed love him, which makes him happy. Eventually Shizuku goes to the cram school and Haru makes a scene in public when she is with Kenji. In the epilogue, he continues to embarrass her even after one class is over, making sure she "goes straight home." They also walk past Chizuru; finally seen together with her friend Yū Miyama, who teases the former about her affection for Haru.
11	"The Yamaguchis' Son, Kenji-kun"; Transliteration: "Yamaguchi-sanchi no Kenji-kun" (Japanese: 山口さんちの賢二くん)	December 11, 2012	
Despite an initial denial, Kenji gradually realizes his romantic feelings for Shizuku. While walking to cram school, Kenji gets into an argument with Haru due to the latter's jealousy, ending with Haru hitting Shizuku on the head with a can after Kenji dodges it. In class, Kenji inadvertently tells Shizuku that he would be a better partner for her. Shizuku compliments his appeal as a person, pleasing Kenji. Getting lost while walking home, Kenji encounters Haru, who offers to walk with him. Kenji has a flashback of his past with Haru, showing how Haru became violent around elementary school. Alone at the bus stop, Haru reminisces about his past with Yuzan. It is revealed that their family was thrown into turmoil because of him, prompting Yuzan to wish that Haru didn't exist, finally explaining Haru's brother complex: avoiding Yuzan because of his true feelings. Shizuku arrives and Haru finally tells her his true feelings: of his suffering because his bizarre ways of showing others affection makes them hate and leave him. Shizuku realizes that her inability to understand him is the root of their problem.
12	"The Year Draws To A Close"; Transliteration: "Toshi wa Kure Yuku" (Japanese: 年は暮れゆく)	December 18, 2012	
Asako reluctantly visits the batting cages to return an item she borrowed from Sasayan. While there, a boy called Yana tries to hit on her, as his friends all tease him. Upset by their behavior, Asako leaves and tells Sasayan that she hates boys because they cause her to be shunned by other girls. Asako and Haru go to a taiyaki restaurant, where she remarks how she feels safe with him because he only likes Shizuku. As the year ends, everyone goes their separate ways, leaving Asako lonely. When Shizuku calls for a favor, Asako bursts, which prompts Shizuku to invite her for a sleepover. Haru explains to Asako that her loneliness was unnecessary because she can visit him whenever she wants, leaving her to ponder if she would still be able to spend time with Haru and Shizuku should they become a couple. Sasayan invites the three to Hatsumōde. Later, the group goes to the roof of the batting cages to await Hatsuhinode. Asako inadvertently confesses to Mitsuyoshi, leaving him speechless. Sasayan overhears the confession, and tells Yana their "plan" failed.
13	"Spring Is Near"; Transliteration: "Haru Tōkaraji" (Japanese: 春遠からじ)	December 25, 2012	
After New Year's, Shizuku is studying when Haru barges into her room and asks Shizuku if she has seen "him". Shizuku doesn't understand what Haru means by "him" but Haru wants to keep it a secret. He goes away, leaving his phone behind. Haru encounters all of his friends while searching for "him," while always leaving something behind. Later, Yu finds Nagoya, Haru's rooster, and brings it to Haru's house, where she meets Haru's friends, there to return the items Haru left behind. Everyone now believes that Haru is looking for Nagoya. Shizuku meets Haru on her way home, who tells her that it isn't Nagoya he is searching for. He is searching for a glowing firefly. Suddenly, the two of them see it. Haru says that the reason he wanted to find the firefly was so he could see it together with Shizuku. Shizuku reflects that there are still many stories left to be told, about her friends and Haru.
OVA	"Sitting Next to Gangster-kun"; Transliteration: "Tonari no Gokudō-kun" (Japanese: となりの極道くん)	August 12, 2013	

== Home media ==
Aniplex released the series in Japan on seven Blu-ray and DVD volumes between November 21, 2012 and May 22, 2013. NIS America will release the series on a single Blu-ray and DVD volume on June 30, 2015, which will include Japanese audio with English subtitles.

Aniplex (Region 2 - Japan)
Vol.	Episodes	Blu-ray / DVD artwork	Bonus disc	Release date	Ref.
1	1	Shizuku Mizutani	Music CD - (「愛が生まれた日」)	November 21, 2012	
2	2, 3	Haru Yoshida	Cast Symposium CD 1	December 26, 2012	
3	4, 5	Asako Natsume	Original Soundtrack	January 23, 2013	
4	6, 7	Sōhei Sasahara	Drama CD	February 27, 2013	
5	8, 9	Kenji Yamaguchi	Cast Symposium CD 2	March 27, 2013	
6	10, 11	Yū Miyama & Chizuru Ōshima	Music CD - (「3年目の浮気」)	April 24, 2013	
7	12, 13	Yūzan Yoshida	Event DVD - Volume 2 Launch	May 22, 2013	

NIS America (Region 1 - North America)
Vol.	Episodes	BD / DVD artwork	Release date	Ref.
1	1–13	Shizuku Mizutani & Haru Yoshida	June 30, 2015	
