= Sake to Koi ni wa Yotte Shikarubeki =

Japanese manga series

- First tankōbon volume cover

酒と恋には酔って然るべき
- Genre: Romantic comedy
- Manga
- Written by: Haruko; Mayumi Eguchi (cooperation)
- Published by: Akita Shoten
- Imprint: ALC DX
- Magazine: Elegance Eve
- Original run: November 26, 2017 – present
- Volumes: 13

Sake to Koi ni wa Yotte Shikarubeki (酒と恋には酔って然るべき) is a Japanese manga series written and illustrated by Haruko with original story cooperation by Mayumi Eguchi. It began serialization in Akita Shoten's josei manga magazine Elegance Eve in November 2017.

== Premise ==
Matsuko Fujii is a 32 year-old sake-loving office worker who has been single for three years, and is enjoying it, but still has desires for romance. One day, the sight of a younger coworker named Kazutomo Imaizumi catches Matsuko's eye. Later on a sake-infused outing with Imaizumi, she finds him cute when drunk, and she wants to pursue a relationship with him.

== Characters ==
Matsuko Fujii (藤井松子, Fujii Matsuko)
Voiced by: Yoshino Aoyama (voice comic)
Kazutomo Imaizumi (今泉和知, Imaizumi Kazutomo)
Voiced by: Soma Saito (voice comic)

== Media ==
=== Manga ===
Written and illustrated by Haruko with original story cooperation by Mayumi Eguchi, Sake to Koi ni wa Yotte Shikarubeki began serialization on Akita Shoten's josei manga magazine Elegance Eve on November 26, 2017. Its chapters have been compiled into thirteen tankōbon volumes as of March 2026.

No.	Release date	ISBN
1	July 13, 2018	978-4-253-15948-7
2	February 15, 2019	978-4-253-15952-4
3	September 13, 2019	978-4-253-15992-0
4	March 16, 2020	978-4-253-15993-7
5	October 16, 2020	978-4-253-15994-4
6	April 16, 2021	978-4-253-16086-5
7	October 15, 2021	978-4-253-16087-2
8	April 14, 2022	978-4-253-16088-9
9	December 15, 2022	978-4-253-16089-6
10	August 16, 2023	978-4-253-16090-2
11	May 16, 2024	978-4-253-16091-9
12	May 15, 2025	978-4-253-16092-6
13	March 16, 2026	978-4-253-01222-5

=== Other ===
In commemoration of the release of the second volume on February 15, 2019, a collaboration chapter with Nagi no Oitoma was released on Akita Shoten's Souffle website that same day.

In commemoration of the release of the tenth volume on August 16, 2023, a voice comic adaptation was uploaded to Akita Shoten's YouTube channel that same day. It featured the voices of Soma Saito and Yoshino Aoyama.

== Reception ==
The series was ranked third in the 2019 Tsutaya Comic Award. The series won the grand prize at the 2020 Digital Comic Awards. The series has been recommended by voice actors Soma Saito and Yoshino Aoyama.

By April 2021, the series had over 1 million copies in circulation.
