= To Dusk and Twilight =

Japanese manga series

- First tankōbon volume cover

夕闇とかたわれ (Yuuyami to Kataware)
- Genre: Supernatural
- Manga
- Written by: Robico
- Published by: Kodansha
- English publisher: Kodansha
- Imprint: Young Magazine KC
- Magazine: YanMaga Web
- Original run: February 19, 2026 – present
- Volumes: 1

To Dusk and Twilight (Japanese: 夕闇とかたわれ, Hepburn: Yuuyami to Kataware) is a Japanese manga series written and illustrated by Robico. It began serialization on Kodansha's YanMaga Web website in February 2026.

== Plot ==
The series is about a teenage vampire girl who meets a suicidal hitman.

== Publication ==
To Dusk and Twilight was first published as a one-shot in a special English edition of Kodansha's Weekly Young Magazine, released on August 18, 2025. It later began serialization as a full series on Kodansha's YanMaga Web website on February 19, 2026. The first volume was released on July 13, 2026.

The series' chapters are simultaneously published in English on Kodansha's K Manga app.

No.	Japanese release date	Japanese ISBN
1	July 13, 2026	978-4-06-543346-1

== Reception ==
In a review for ComicsBeat, Justin Guerrero gave To Dusk and Twilight a positive review, saying the manga "scratched my vampire itch."
