= Omae, Tanuki ni Naranē ka? =

Japanese manga series

- First tankōbon volume cover

お前、タヌキにならねーか？
- Manga
- Written by: Tomo Nagawa
- Published by: Ichijinsha
- Magazine: Comic Pool
- Original run: April 28, 2021 – present
- Volumes: 10
- Anime television series
- Directed by: Jun Kamiya
- Written by: Masaki Wachi
- Music by: Minako Seki
- Studio: Nippon Animation

Omae, Tanuki ni Naranē ka? (お前、タヌキにならねーか？; lit. 'Would you like to be a tanuki?') is a Japanese manga series written and illustrated by Tomo Nagawa. It was originally published as a webcomic on the author's Pixiv account in August 2020. It later began serialization on Ichijinsha's Pixiv Comic-based Comic Pool website in April 2021. An anime television series adaptation produced by Nippon Animation has been announced.

== Plot ==
Koganemaru, a shapeshifting tanuki, approaches troubled people in modern-day Japan and offers to transform them into tanuki. Although his stated goal is to increase the population of tanuki living in the mountains, his encounters often help the people he meets step away from the pressures of human society and reconsider the problems weighing on them. Through a series of largely self-contained stories, Koganemaru's transformations and interventions lead each person toward a clearer understanding of their own life and a renewed sense of emotional relief.

== Media ==
=== Manga ===
Written and illustrated by Tomo Nagawa, Omae, Tanuki ni Naranē ka? was originally published as a webcomic on Nagawa's Pixiv account on August 15, 2020. It later began serialization on Ichijinsha's Pixiv Comic-based Comic Pool website on April 28, 2021. Its chapters have been collected into ten tankōbon volumes as of May 2026.

No.	Release date	ISBN
1	May 1, 2021	978-4-7580-2232-3
2	November 25, 2021	978-4-7580-2304-7
3	May 25, 2022	978-4-7580-2405-1
4	December 26, 2022	978-4-7580-2470-9
5	July 25, 2023	978-4-7580-2551-5
6	March 26, 2024	978-4-7580-2654-3
7	August 26, 2024	978-4-7580-2754-0
8	March 25, 2025	978-4-7580-2875-2
9	October 27, 2025	978-4-7580-2986-5
10	May 25, 2026	978-4-7580-9900-4

=== Anime ===
An anime television series adaptation was announced on May 20, 2026. It will be produced by Nippon Animation and directed by Jun Kamiya with series composition and screenplays by Masaki Wachi, character designs by Cocoro Takemoto, and music by Minako Seki.

== Reception ==
The series was ranked seventh in the 2022 Tsutaya Comic Award. The series was also ranked fifth out of 61 nominees in the ninth Next Manga Awards in the web category in 2023. The series was also ranked 6th in the Web Manga General Election 2023.
