= Spring Storm and Monster =

Japanese manga series

- First tankōbon volume cover

春の嵐とモンスター (Haru no Arashi to Monsutā)
- Genre: Romantic comedy
- Manga
- Written by: Mitsubachi Miyuki
- Published by: Hakusensha
- English publisher: NA: Yen Press
- Imprint: Hana to Yume Comics
- Magazine: Hana to Yume
- Original run: July 5, 2022 – present
- Volumes: 12

Spring Storm and Monster (Japanese: 春の嵐とモンスター, Hepburn: Haru no Arashi to Monsutā) is a Japanese manga series written and illustrated by Mitsubachi Miyuki. It began serialization in Hakusensha's shōjo manga magazine Hana to Yume in July 2022.

== Synopsis ==
Ranko Haruno is a high school girl who wants to avoid contact with as many people as possible, preferring only her mother and her pet pig. One day, she encounters an intimidating student named Kaya Amamine, and runs away from him. Later, her mom tells her that she is getting remarried and that she would be getting a step-brother. Then it turns out that her step-brother would be Kaya Amamine, the boy she was trying to avoid earlier.

== Characters ==
Ranko Haruno (春野 嵐子, Haruno Ranko)
Voiced by: Reina Ueda (PV)
Kaya Amamine (天峰 栢, Amamine Kaya)
Voiced by: Koki Uchiyama (PV)
Hayato Nasu (南須 迅人, Nasu Hayato)
Voiced by: Nobunaga Shimazaki (PV)
Mihane Hoshii (星井 美羽, Hoshii Mihane)
Voiced by: Yū Serizawa (PV)

== Publication ==
Written and illustrated by Mitsubachi Miyuki, Spring Storm and Monster began serialization in Hakusensha's shōjo manga magazine Hana to Yume on July 5, 2022. Its chapters have been collected into twelve tankōbon volumes as of November 2026.

In March 2024, Yen Press announced that it had licensed the series for English publication, with the first volume set to be released in September.

=== Volumes ===
No.	Original release date	Original ISBN	English release date	English ISBN
1	November 18, 2022	978-4-592-22441-9	September 17, 2024	978-1-9753-7996-4
Days 1–5
2	March 20, 2023	978-4-592-22442-6	January 21, 2025	979-8-8554-0509-5
Days 6–10
3	July 20, 2023	978-4-592-22443-3	July 1, 2025	979-8-8554-0511-8
Days 11–15
4	December 20, 2023	978-4-592-22444-0	October 28, 2025	979-8-8554-0513-2
Days 16–20
5	May 20, 2024	978-4-592-22486-0	February 24, 2026	979-8-8554-2337-2
Days 21–25
6	October 18, 2024	978-4-592-22502-7	October 27, 2026	979-8-8554-2339-6
Days 26–30
7	February 20, 2025	978-4-592-22518-8	March 23, 2027	979-8-8554-4728-6
8	July 18, 2025	978-4-592-22537-9	—	—
9	November 20, 2025	978-4-592-22552-2	—	—
10	March 19, 2026	978-4-592-22573-7	—	—
11	July 17, 2026	978-4-592-22587-4	—	—
12	November 20, 2026	978-4-592-22596-6; 978-4-592-23149-3 (SE)	—	—

== Reception ==
The series was nominated for the ninth Next Manga Awards in 2023 in the print category and was ranked twelfth out of 41 nominees; the manga ranked 11th at the same award in 2024. The series was ranked ninth at the Tsutaya Comic Award in 2023.

== See also ==
- Cheeky Brat, another manga series by the same author
- Stray Cat & Wolf, another manga series by the same author
