= My New Boss Is Goofy =

Japanese manga series

- First tankōbon volume cover

新しい上司はど天然 (Atarashii Jōshi wa Do Tennen)
- Genre: Iyashikei; Office comedy
- Manga
- Written by: Dan Ichikawa
- Published by: Akita Shoten
- English publisher: NA: Seven Seas Entertainment
- Imprint: Young Champion Comics
- Magazine: Manga Cross
- Original run: February 5, 2019 – present
- Volumes: 2
- Anime television series
- Directed by: Noriyuki Abe
- Written by: Masahiro Yokotani
- Music by: Masato Nakayama
- Studio: A-1 Pictures
- Licensed by: NA: Aniplex of America
- Original network: Tokyo MX, GYT, GTV, ABC
- Original run: October 7, 2023 – December 23, 2023
- Episodes: 12
- icon

My New Boss Is Goofy (Japanese: 新しい上司はど天然, Hepburn: Atarashii Jōshi wa Do Tennen) is a Japanese manga series written and illustrated by Dan Ichikawa. It has been published on Akita Shoten's online manga platform Manga Cross since February 2019. An anime television series adaptation produced by A-1 Pictures aired from October to December 2023.

== Synopsis ==
Kentarō Momose, whose physical and mental health deteriorated after his boss' power harassment, changed his job to a sales position at an advertising agency. However, due to his trauma, he is unable to move due to stomach pain during his first tour. Momose's new boss, Shirosaki, leaves Momose without saying anything, and Momose becomes worried that his new boss will be the same as before.

As he panics, Shirosaki returns with medicine for menstruation cramps, realizing in his panic he defaulted to the stomach pain medication he bought for his ex-girlfriend, and the tension is relieved as Momose realizes the reason his boss disappeared.

The series continues to follow the two of them as Momose struggles to overcome his trauma and Shirosaki's accidental antics and good-hearted attempts to protect Momose slowly help him recover.

Following a phone call from his former boss and a threat to stalk his apartment, Momose moves in suddenly with Shirosaki.

== Characters ==
Yūsei Shirosaki (白崎 優清, Shirosaki Yūsei)
Voiced by: Takahiro Sakurai (drama CD), Yūichirō Umehara (anime)
Member of the Planning and Sales department at Minette. Originally from Akita Prefecture, his family members are rice farmers and his older brother a photographer. Despite his airheadedness, his work performance is good. His "goofiness" thusly endears him to his subordinates.
Kentarō Momose (桃瀬 健太郎, Momose Kentarō)
Voiced by: Koutaro Nishiyama
Employee of Minette at their headquarters in the Planning and Sales department. He grew up in Hokkaido. His previous company was a black company where he always had overtime and suffered from power harassment under his boss. After seeing an ad created by Shirosaki, he quit and joined Minette, where he reports to Shirosaki.
Mitsuo Aoyama (青山 光男, Aoyama Mitsuo)
Voiced by: Tomokazu Sugita
Head of the Planning and Sales department at Minette. He hails from Kyoto Prefecture. His wife left him shortly after he bought a house due to feeling neglected because of his focus on work and providing for his family, and a new employee he was in charge of ran away after a week. As a result, he has low self-esteem and is lonely. His home is filled with mascot dolls in an attempt to soothe his loneliness. 10 years ago, he was Shirosaki's mentor.
Aigo Kinjō (金城 愛悟, Kinjō Aigo)
Voiced by: Tatsuhisa Suzuki (drama CD), Jun Fukuyama (anime)
Employee of the Planning and Sales department at Minette. He is originally from Okinawa. Technically Momose's junior at the company, they treat each other as colleagues. Like Momose, he was also subject to power harassment, and seeing Momose and Shirosaki interact motivated him to switch jobs. He is openly bisexual and a fan of anime, which Momose finds astounding.
Hakutō (白桃)
Voiced by: Hiro Shimono
An abandoned cat that Momose and Shirosaki found and picked up. He was abandoned because he sharpened his nails on his owner's couch, but he says he ran away because of his owner's power harassment. Shirosaki adopts him and Hakuto quickly realizes Shirosaki is not inclined to abandon him, but still struggles to admit his own affections.

== Media ==
=== Manga ===
Written and illustrated by Dan Ichikawa, My New Boss Is Goofy first started as webcomic published by the author on Twitter in 2018; it was proven popular and began serialization on Akita Shoten's online manga platform Manga Cross on February 5, 2019. Akita Shoten has collected its chapters into individual tankōbon volumes. The first volume was released on August 20, 2019. As of May 20, 2020, two volumes have been released.

In October 2024, Seven Seas Entertainment announced that it had licensed the manga for English release in North America, with the first volume set to be released in April 2025.

==== Volumes ====
No.	Original release date	Original ISBN	English release date	English ISBN
1	August 20, 2019	978-4-253-14231-1	April 29, 2025	979-8-89373-445-4
2	May 20, 2020	978-4-253-14232-8	August 19, 2025	979-8-89373-698-4

=== Anime ===
In May 2023, it was announced that the series would receive an anime television series adaptation. It was animated by A-1 Pictures and directed by Noriyuki Abe, with Ayako Kōno serving as assistant director, Masahiro Yokotani in charge of the scripts, Takahiro Yasuda serving as character designer and chief animation director, music composed by Masato Nakayama and Jin Aketagawa serving as sound director. The series aired for 12 episodes from October 7 to December 23, 2023, on Tokyo MX and other networks. The opening theme song is "Planeteria" (プラネタリア) by Fujifabric, while the ending theme song is "Hanataba" (花束; "Bouquet") by Lenny code fiction.

In North America, the series is licensed by Aniplex of America, and streamed by Crunchyroll.

==== Episodes ====
No.	Title	Directed by	Written by	Storyboarded by	Original release date
1	"It's a Little Cracked!!"; Transliteration: "Chotto Wareteru!!" (Japanese: ちょっと割れてる！！)	Noriyuki Abe	Masahiro Yokotani	Noriyuki Abe	October 7, 2023
2	"Should I Carry You Piggyback?"; Transliteration: "Onbu Suru ka?" (Japanese: おんぶするか？)	Ayako Kōno	Masahiro Yokotani	Ayako Kōno	October 14, 2023
3	"Paws, Paws, Paws..."; Transliteration: "Nikukyū Nikukyū Nikukyū..." (Japanese: 肉球肉球肉球…)	Yuki Watanabe	Sumika Hayakawa	Yuki Watanabe	October 21, 2023
4	"Wanna Live with Me?"; Transliteration: "Uchi, Sumu?" (Japanese: うち、住む？)	Chikayo Nakamura	Masahiro Yokotani	Chikayo Nakamura	October 28, 2023
5	"Heart Eyes!"; Transliteration: "Me kara Hachimitsu!" (Japanese: 目からはちみつ！)	Shōtarō Kitamura	Sumika Hayakawa	Shōtarō Kitamura	November 4, 2023
6	"Ex-Boyfriend? Ex-Boyfriend?? Ex-Boyfriend???"; Transliteration: "Moto Kare? Moto Kare?? Moto Kare???" (Japanese: 元カレ？元カレ？？元カレ？？？)	Aika Ikeda	Masahiro Yokotani	Toshinori Watanabe	November 11, 2023
7	"The Shocking Truth...!!"; Transliteration: "Shōgeki no Jijitsu...!!" (Japanese: 衝撃の事実…！！)	Ema Saitō	Masahiro Yokotani	Ema Saitō	November 18, 2023
8	"Wanna Visit My Family Home?"; Transliteration: "Ore no Jikka, Kuru?" (Japanese: 俺の実家、来る？)	Yuki Watanabe	Sumika Hayakawa	Tomoyuki Munehiro	November 25, 2023
9	"I'll Listen to That~!"; Transliteration: "Sore Kiichaimasu～!?" (Japanese: それ聞いちゃいます～！？)	Moe Suzuki	Sumika Hayakawa	Chikayo Nakamura	December 2, 2023
10	"Take Responsibility...!"; Transliteration: "Kiseru Kida...!" (Japanese: 着せる気だ…！)	Yūta Suzuki	Masahiro Yokotani	Yūta Suzuki	December 9, 2023
11	"I Have to Find a Place to Live!"; Transliteration: "Oie no Chū Tanken nya!" (Japanese: お家の中探検にゃ！)	Nozomi Fukui	Masahiro Yokotani	Nozomi Fukui	December 16, 2023
12	"Be Back Soon...!?"; Transliteration: "Ittekima～…su!?" (Japanese: いってきま～…す！？)	Ayako Kōno	Masahiro Yokotani	Ayako Kōno	December 23, 2023

== Reception ==
The series won the pixiv and Nippon Shuppan Hanbai's "Web Manga General Election" in 2019. In that same year, the series ranked seventh in the fifth Next Manga Awards in the web category. The series placed third in Tsutaya Comic Award in 2020. In that same year, the series ranked second on AnimeJapan's "Most Wanted Anime Adaptation" poll.
