= Firefly Wedding =

Japanese manga series

- First tankōbon volume cover

ホタルの嫁入り (Hotaru no Yomeiri)
- Genre: Historical, romance
- Manga
- Written by: Oreco Tachibana
- Published by: Shogakukan
- English publisher: NA: Comikey (digital); Viz Media
- Imprint: Ura Sunday Comics (1–5); Manga One Comics (6–13)
- Magazine: MangaONE; Ura Sunday
- Original run: January 1, 2023 – August 3, 2026
- Volumes: 13 + 1 side story
- Anime television series
- Directed by: Takahiro Kamei
- Written by: Yūko Kakihara
- Music by: Nogrid
- Studio: David Production
- Licensed by: Crunchyroll; SEA: Muse Communication
- Original network: FNS (Fuji TV)
- Original run: October 9, 2026 – present
- Episodes: 6
- Television drama
- Original network: Fuji TV
- Original run: 2027 – scheduled
- icon

Firefly Wedding (Japanese: ホタルの嫁入り, Hepburn: Hotaru no Yomeiri) is a Japanese manga series written and illustrated by Oreco Tachibana. It was serialized on Shogakukan's Ura Sunday manga website, under their "Girl's Club" label, and MangaONE app from January 2023 to February 2026. An anime television series adaptation produced by David Production premiered in October 2026. A television drama adaptation is set to premiere in 2027.

== Plot ==
Set during the Meiji era, Satoko Kirigaya is the daughter of an earl and renowned for her beauty and position. However, she does not have a lot of time left to live due to a heart condition; her only dream is to marry for the good of her family. However, her peaceful existence is unexpectedly disrupted by the attack of a mysterious, deranged assassin, Shinpei Goto. In desperation, Satoko proposes marriage. Although it was supposed to be a fake relationship, Shinpei proves to be a man full of love despite his psychopathy.

Shinpei takes Satoko to Tennyo Island, home to a flourishing red-light district, where she assumes the role of a courtesan while searching for a way to return to her family. During her stay, she becomes acquainted with the other courtesans and gradually develops real feelings for Shinpei, despite his violent occupation, possessiveness, and unpredictable behavior. Their relationship is further complicated by the arrival of Kotaro Ogawa, a longtime acquaintance and bodyguard of the Kirigaya family, who attempts to bring Satoko home. As Satoko's feelings for Shinpei deepen, she begins to question her family's expectations and the marriage she had originally envisioned for herself.

Satoko subsequently discovers that her kidnapping was orchestrated by her father, Jubei Kirigaya, who intended to arrange a seemingly accidental encounter with a suitable marriage candidate. After Satoko refuses to return home without Shinpei, Jubei forcibly separates them and brings her back to the family estate. Determined to reunite with Shinpei, Satoko rejects her father's plans for her marriage, including a proposed engagement to Mitsuharu Okumura, the son of a duke. Although Mitsuharu initially attempts to win her affection, he eventually becomes involved in efforts to find treatment for her worsening heart condition. Satoko and Shinpei ultimately reunite and resolve to spend their remaining time together.

The couple returns to Tennyo Island, where they hold a private wedding ceremony and begin living together. However, Satoko's health continues to deteriorate, and she eventually loses consciousness. Shinpei takes her to Mitsuharu's residence and mistakenly concludes that she has died, and leaves her body with Mitsuharu. Overcome by grief, he leaves the island and spends the following decades traveling throughout Japan, without ever returning to visit Satoko's grave, in the assumption that she had died.

Several decades later, an elderly Shinpei learns that Tennyo Island is set to be demolished and returns to visit the home he once shared with Satoko. There, he encounters Kotaro, who finally gives him a letter from Satoko that he has had for many years. The letter reveals that she somehow survived her illness after receiving treatment from a physician whom Mitsuharu had brought from overseas after Shinpei left her body. She had spent all those years waiting alone for Shinpei's return. The series concludes with Shinpei visiting their former home, where he and Satoko reunite as elders after fifty years of separation over miscommunication.

== Characters ==
Satoko Kirigaya (桐ケ谷 紗都子, Kirigaya Satoko)
Voiced by: Yui Ishikawa (PV), Lynn (anime) (Japanese); Rowan Gilvie (English)
Born into a respected family, Satoko is an intelligent young woman whose life is constrained by a serious heart condition. Despite her medical limitations, her primary goal is to fulfill her father's wish for his daughter's happiness by finding a suitable spouse to care for her. But as she spends more time on the island with Shinpei, she can't help but develop feelings for him due to his openness.
Shinpei Goto (後藤 進平, Gotō Shinpei)
Voiced by: Koki Uchiyama (PV, anime) (Japanese); Kieran Flitton (English)
A psychopathic assassin who was originally hired to eliminate Satoko following her abduction. Initially assisting her for personal gain, he eventually developed genuine feelings for her.
Kōtarō Ogawa (小川 康太郎, Ogawa Kōtarō)
Voiced by: Kent Itō (anime) (Japanese); Ben Stegmair (English)
Kotaro is the childhood friend and bodyguard of Satoko. Born on May 15, he has known the Kirigaya family for years and supports Satoko's dream.
Mitsueda (三枝)
Voiced by: Kenjiro Tsuda (anime) (Japanese); Jason Douglas (English)
He is a yakuza from Tennyo Island. He accepts the job to kidnap Satoko and hires Shinpei to kill her, directly intervening in the events that bring the aristocrat and the assassin together.
Yukari (紫)
Voiced by: Kanon Amane (anime) (Japanese); Skye Redden (English)
A courtesan at the Isekichi brothel. She has feelings for Shinpei, but he never reciprocates them, leading her to take her anger and frustrations out on Satoko out of jealousy.
Eishin Nitobe (新渡戸栄進, Nitobe Eishin)
Voiced by: Kazuyuki Okitsu (anime)
As the son of the Superintendent General, he represents authority, influence, and the possibility of genuine protection. Compared to Shinpei's violent world, Nitobe appears to offer Satoko a path to safety and social order.
Aoi (あおい)
Voiced by: Natsuko Abe (anime) (Japanese); Natalie Hoover (English)
Satoko's mentor and fellow courtesan at the Isekichi brothel.

== Media ==
=== Manga ===
Written and illustrated by Oreco Tachibana, Firefly Wedding began serialization on Shogakukan's Ura Sunday manga website and MangaONE app on January 1, 2023. The series ended its main story on February 2, 2026, with seven spin-off chapters being released between February 2 and August 3, 2026. Its chapters were collected into thirteen tankōbon volumes released from June 19, 2023, to October 19, 2026. A single volume containing the side story chapters was released on October 19, 2026.

The series' chapters are published in English by Comikey. In May 2024, Viz Media announced that they would release volumes of the series in Q2 2025.

No.	Original release date	Original ISBN	English release date	English ISBN
1	June 19, 2023	978-4-09-852147-0	January 14, 2025	978-1-9747-5151-8
Chapters 1–5; Bonus
2	September 12, 2023	978-4-09-852825-7	April 29, 2025	978-1-9747-5229-4
Chapters 6–12
3	December 19, 2023	978-4-09-853064-9	July 8, 2025	978-1-9747-5519-6
Chapters 13–19
4	April 18, 2024	978-4-09-853211-7	October 14, 2025	978-1-9747-5857-9
Chapters 20–26
5	August 19, 2024	978-4-09-853526-2	January 6, 2026	978-1-9747-6142-5
Chapters 27–32; Bonus
6	December 19, 2024	978-4-09-853762-4	April 7, 2026	978-1-9747-6143-2
Chapters 33–38
7	March 18, 2025	978-4-09-854039-6	July 14, 2026	978-1-9747-6144-9
Chapters 39–44
8	June 18, 2025	978-4-09-854111-9; 978-4-09-943201-0 (SE)	October 13, 2026	978-1-9747-6538-6
Chapters 45–49; Bonus: "Kotaro Ogawa" Part 1–2
9	September 19, 2025	978-4-09-854250-5	January 5, 2027	978-1-9747-6643-7
10	December 19, 2025	978-4-09-854352-6	—	—
11	February 19, 2026	978-4-09-854432-5	—	—
12	June 19, 2026	978-4-09-854526-1	—	—
13	October 19, 2026	978-4-09-854848-4	—	—
SS	October 19, 2026	978-4-09-854849-1	—	—

=== Anime ===
An anime television series adaptation was announced on January 12, 2026. It will be produced by David Production and directed by Takahiro Kamei, with series composition handled Yūko Kakihara, characters designed by Yukiko Aikei, and music composed by Nogrid. The series premiered on October 9, 2026, on the Noitamina programming block on Fuji TV and its affiliates. The opening theme song is "Period", performed by Iri, and the ending theme song is "Yumegokochi" (夢心地; lit. 'Feeling Good'), performed by Tooboe. Crunchyroll will stream the series. Muse Communication licensed the series in Southeast Asia.

==== Episodes ====
No.	Title	Directed by (Note: Production staff information is taken from the ending credits of each episode.)	Written by	Storyboard by	Original release date
1	"An Unwanted Repayment"; Transliteration: "Nozomanai Ongaeshi" (Japanese: 望まない恩返し)	Yūki Morita	Yūko Kakihara	Takahiro Kamei	October 9, 2026
During the Meiji era, the beautiful Satoko Kirigaya suffers from a terminal heart condition but agrees to marry a husband of her father's choosing for the good of the family. Her stepsister Miwako is jealous of Satoko's multiple marriage offers despite her terminal diagnosis. Her father Jubei wishes Satoko to marry for love, but must also find her a husband wealthy enough to support her poor health. Satoko is kidnapped by thugs who hand her over to the violent assassin Shinpei Goto, revealing they have been paid to keep Satoko safe until 9pm, then execute her. The thugs attempt to rape Satoko, but Shinpei severs their arms and legs. Desperate for protection, Satoko claims to have fallen in love with Shinpei for saving her, and proposes marrying him so he can have her wealth. Amused and disbelieving her claims of love, Shinpei nonetheless escapes with her, killing dozens of thugs sent after them. He mocks her unwillingness to kiss him and her wealth that gives her no reason to worry about her future. Angered, she kisses him then reveals her bad heart means she has no future. Smitten that she kissed him despite his savage violence, Shinpei manically agrees to marry her.
2	"Tennyo Island"; Transliteration: "Tennyo Shima" (Japanese: 天女島)	Kiyomitsu Satō	Yūko Kakihara	Junichi Sakata	October 16, 2026
Satoko suspects Miwako and her stepmother arranged her death. Convinced she might be lying about marrying him, Shinpei claims he might kill himself to leave her defenceless. When thugs attack, Satoko insists he stay alive until after protecting her, so he kills them. Shinpei reveals they are on Tennyo Island, a giant red-light district off the mainland coast. Shinpei suggests he might spend a night with the courtesans before killing himself, leaving a humiliated Satoko to realize her ignorance of the outside world. When a man mockingly offers her rice for a dance, she defiantly eats it from the ground and performs in the street. As numerous men attempt to buy her, Shinpei steps in, explaining he was raised on the island, so many courtesans are actually like his older sisters. Seeing men were willing to pay for her, Satoko suggests she no longer needs him to get her home. Shinpei apologizes and takes her to a firefly-lit lake, confessing his sincere love. However, when she asks to leave, Shinpei reveals powerful men keep the island secret from the authorities, meaning her only means of escape is becoming a courtesan and convincing a patron to buy her freedom without having sex with him. Back at her father's estate, the guard who failed to prevent Satoko's kidnapping is given physical punishment and swears to submit to execution after finding and bringing Satoko home safely.
3	"A Watchful Rat"; Transliteration: "Mihari no Nezumi" (Japanese: 見張りの鼠)	Yukio Kuroda	Yūko Kakihara	Kenji Setō	October 23, 2026
Shinpei takes Satoko to the brothel Isekichi, where her first customer is Eishin, the Police Superintendent’s son, an infamous drunk, but Shinpei assures her there is no alcohol in the room. Eishin reveals his strict father controls his entire life, so he can only relax anonymously in brothels, prompting Satoko to admit she is a hostage. Eishin offers to buy her freedom through marriage, but Satoko realizes she cannot betray Shinpei. When Shinpei secretly threatens Eishin's life, Satoko covers Eishin's eyes while pretending she saw a rat. After Shinpei vanishes, Eishin unknowingly drinks juice spiked with alcohol by Shinpei's jealous sisters. Passing out, Eishin awakens as his repressed second personality: a lustful beast. The beast prepares to rape her, confessing he indulges in all the disgusting and illegal desires Eishin keeps repressed. The beast loses interest on seeing her heart surgery scars, but offers to help her anyway if she marries him and allows him access to the Kirigaya family wealth and influence, but she refuses to marry a scumbag. Enraged, the beast tries to strangle her. Shinpei stabs his arm and the beast shoots Shinpei’s shoulder. As Madam considers intervening, the Manager warns her Shinpei orchestrated everything to rescue Satoko and win her affection.
4	"I'll Set You Free"; Transliteration: "Jiyū ni Shite Ageru" (Japanese: 自由にしてあげる)	Yoshinobu Kasai	Yuta Suzuki	Naga Akishige	October 30, 2026
Shinpei savagely beats the beast until Satoko stops him, explaining violence does not make him attractive. Shinpei is disappointed his plan failed. Eishin apologises for what the beast did and agrees to tell Satoko's father where she is. Satoko worries about Shinpei seeing her scar but Shinpei assures her his own are worse, pleasing her. Satoko coughs blood and passes out. Upon awakening, she reveals she dreamt of her childhood isolation, prompting Shinpei to catch fireflies to cheer her up. Touched, she releases them, as like herself, fireflies only have short lives and deserve freedom. Satoko asks what he likes about her and Shinpei's reply, that she was simply the first to accept him, disappoints her. He retorts that she has never experienced real love either, upsetting her. When she refuses to confirm their marriage plans, a murderous Shinpei is surprised when she simply kicks him out. He spends a confused night on the roof while Satoko feels guilty for her anger. The next morning, Shinpei manages to bribe a captain to smuggle them to the mainland in ten days. Meanwhile, Satoko becomes a cleaner at Isekichi. She discovers Shinpei works publicly as a guard protecting courtesans from abusive customers, explaining his popularity with them. Jealous courtesans demand she distance herself from Shinpei, claiming Shinpei loves senior courtesan Yukari.
5	"Hurt"; Transliteration: "Shōshin" (Japanese: 傷心)	Sai Sharaku	Yuta Suzuki	Kōji Hōri	November 6, 2026
Satoko acts unbothered, prompting the courtesans to leave. One courtesan, Aoi, becomes close to Satoko, explaining being overweight makes it hard to keep customers, though she hopes to marry her lover. Satoko is confused by Aoi’s joy, viewing marriage as a duty. Aoi reveals Yukari and Shinpei were once lovers, confusing Satoko since Shinpei denied past closeness with any woman. Yukari tries seducing Shinpei within Satoko's sight, but he gets upset when Satoko doesn't react. Ignoring Yukari's nudity, he asks who spiked Eishin's drink to unleash the beast. Yukari feigns ignorance and, furious upon learning of Shinpei's engagement to Satoko, claims she was also a victim of the beast. Shinpei unsympathetically tells her to just avoid the beast next time. Satoko's quiet fury makes Aoi deduce she loves Shinpei. Satoko admits it might be true, but it changes nothing due to her destined political marriage, saddening Aoi. Later, someone locks Satoko and Shinpei in a firewood shed. Trapped, Shinpei admits he loves her and wants to make her happy. Guilt-ridden, Satoko reveals her future arranged marriage and that she lied out of fear. Angry, Shinpei breaks out through a window but immediately returns, promising to kill all rival suitors until he is the only man she can marry. Yukari finds out the two are locked in the shed and plots revenge. Aoi harbours sinister motives from the shadows.
6	"Honest Feelings"; Transliteration: "Shōjiki na Kimochi" (Japanese: 正直な気持ち)	Yūsuke Kurinishi	Yuta Suzuki	Junichi Sakata	November 13, 2026
Satoko feels guilty Shinpei forgave her. Shinpei is confronted by the kidnapper's leader Mitsueda. In Satoko's room, Yukari accuses Satoko of luring Shinpei to the shed, so she has decided to stitch her vagina shut with a needle, forcing the horrified Hatsune and Sawarabi to help her. Satoko accuses them of cowardice and warns that Madam Tamaki is tired of their troublemaking and may evict or kill them if they go too far. Convinced to save themselves, Hatsune and Sawarabi turn on Yukari instead, who panics when Satoko approaches her with the needle. Abandoning his fight with Mitsueda, Shinpei rushes back to find Satoko comically threatening Yukari with the needle. Having been lied to himself by Satoko, Shinpei finally understands Yukari's heartbreak, so he admits he only ever saw Yukari as a courtesan and apologises for hurting her, prompting Yukari to flee in tears. Shinpei reveals it was Aoi who locked them in the shed. Aoi confesses she did it to punish Yukari for seducing her lover, then runs to a cliff to commit suicide. Satoko stops her, arguing that dreams matter as much as love, so Aoi can still find happiness without her lover. Aoi and Satoko reconcile, and Satoko looks forward to leaving the island with Shinpei. Months later, Aoi's lover Mizutani returns, having finally earned enough money to buy her freedom and marry her.
7	"A Devil and His Heart"; Transliteration: "Oni to Shinzō" (Japanese: 鬼と心臓)	Kiyomitsu Satō & Yoshihisa Matsumoto	Yūko Kakihara	Tetsuo Hirakawa	November 20, 2026
Eishin delivers Satoko’s message to Jubei. Satoko and Shinpei finally leave the island with the bribed ship captain. Unsure of Shinpei’s intentions once they reach the mainland, Satoko struggles to talk normally with him. Shinpei confesses he still wants to marry her and considered kidnapping her, though he refuses to sadden her by keeping her from her father. When Mitsueda’s thugs pursue them, Shinpei leaps onto their boats to fight them off, noticeably sparing everyone’s lives to obey Satoko’s earlier demand that he stop killing. However, two skilled assassins stab him in the back, and the giant Shido crushes him. Bleeding out and wishing he could have given Satoko his heart, Shinpei jumps overboard with her. Mitsueda lets them go, assuming they will drown. Aoi finds them washed ashore back on the island. Although the stab wound missed his organs, Tamaki expects Shinpei to die from blood loss and broken bones. After Satoko exhaustingly nurses him for seven nights, Shinpei wakes to find her sharing his bed to keep him warm, believing he is in heaven. Relieved, Satoko cries and scolds his recklessness, only to be shocked when he kisses her, then kisses the scars over her heart. Her scandalised screams attract everyone's attention, including Yukari who is outraged at their lewdness.

=== Drama ===
A television drama adaptation was announced on October 10, 2026. It is set to premiere on Fuji TV in 2027.

=== Other media ===
A voice comic commemorating the release of the first volume was released on Flower Comics' YouTube channel on June 19, 2023. A television commercial and promotional video commemorating the release of the second volume was released on MangaONE's YouTube channel on September 12, 2023. The voice comic features the performances of Yui Ishikawa as Satoko Kirigaya and Koki Uchiyama as Shinpei Goto, while the promotional video and commercial features only Uchiyama reprising his role as Shinpei.

== Reception ==
The series had 4 million copies in circulation by September 2025.

The series was ranked fifth for the Tsutaya Comic Award. The series also ranked ninth in the 2024 edition of Takarajimasha's Kono Manga ga Sugoi! guidebook for the best manga for female readers. The series won the grand prize at NTT Solmare's Digital Comic Awards in 2024. The series was ranked first in the Nationwide Bookstore Employees' Recommended Comics list of 2024. The series was also nominated for the 48th Kodansha Manga Award in the shōjo category. The series was ranked tenth in the web category for the 2024 Next Manga Awards. The series was ranked third in AnimeJapan's "Manga We Want to See Animated" poll in 2025. The series was nominated for the 71st Shogakukan Manga Award.

== See also ==
- Promise Cinderella, another manga series by the same author
