= Ultra-Fem Shishihara-kun =

Japanese manga series

- Cover of the first volume

女子力高めな獅子原くん (Joshiryoku Takamena Shishihara-kun)
- Genre: Comedy
- Manga
- Written by: Mii Aimai
- Published by: Comic Smart (digital); Ichijinsha (print)
- English publisher: NA: Mangamo
- Imprint: Zero Sum Comics
- Magazine: Ganma!
- Original run: September 8, 2019 – present
- Volumes: 11

Ultra-Fem Shishihara-kun (Japanese: 女子力高めな獅子原くん, Hepburn: Joshiryoku Takamena Shishihara-kun) is a Japanese manga series written and illustrated by Mii Aimai. It began serialization on Comic Smart's Ganma! website in September 2019. As of April 2026, Ichijinsha has released eleven volumes.

== Publication ==
Written and illustrated by Mii Aimai, the series originated as a one-shot released in August 2019. The one-shot was turned into a full series, which began serialization on Comic Smart's Ganma! website on September 8, 2019. As of April 2026, Ichijinsha has collected the series' individual chapters into eleven tankōbon volumes.

Mangamo is publishing the series in English digitally.

=== Volume list ===
No.	Japanese release date	Japanese ISBN
1	June 25, 2020	978-4-75-803525-5
2	December 24, 2020	978-4-75-803573-6
3	August 25, 2021	978-4-75-803645-0
4	April 25, 2022	978-4-75-803729-7
5	February 25, 2023	978-4-75-803856-0
6	July 25, 2023	978-4-75-803912-3
7	December 25, 2023	978-4-75-803972-7
8	September 30, 2024	978-4-7580-8586-1
9	February 28, 2025	978-4-7580-8657-8
10	September 30, 2025	978-4-7580-8810-7
11	April 30, 2026	978-4-7580-9853-3

== Reception ==
Danica Davidson of Otaku USA praised the setup, characters, setting, and story, though Davidson felt the story was a bit unoriginal. ITmedia's columnists praised the characters and how they interact.

The series ranked 16th in the 2021 Next Manga Award in the web manga category; it was also nominated for the same award in 2023. In the 2022 Tsutaya Comic Award, the series ranked eighth.
