= Stray Cat & Wolf =

Japanese manga series

- First tankōbon volume cover

野良猫と狼 (Noraneko to Ōkami)
- Genre: Romance
- Manga
- Written by: Mitsubachi Miyuki
- Published by: Hakusensha
- English publisher: NA: Yen Press
- Imprint: Hana to Yume Comics
- Magazine: The Hana to Yume
- Original run: July 25, 2019 – present
- Volumes: 7

Stray Cat & Wolf (Japanese: 野良猫と狼, Hepburn: Noraneko to Ōkami) is a Japanese manga series written and illustrated by Mitsubachi Miyuki. It began serialization in Hakusensha's shōjo manga magazine The Hana to Yume in July 2019.

== Synopsis ==
After losing her parents, Tamaki Mishina moves to Tokyo in order to go to high school, and later gets kicked out of the school's dormitory. Now homeless, she wakes up in the apartment of the musician Rou, and takes accommodation. Rou, however is not pleased, and tries to kick her out due to his belief that boys and girls should not share the same room.

== Publication ==
Written and illustrated by Mitsubachi Miyuki, Stray Cat & Wolf began serialization in Hakusensha's shōjo manga magazine The Hana to Yume on July 25, 2019. Its chapters have been collected into seven tankōbon volumes as of July 2026.

During their panel at Sakura-Con 2023, Yen Press announced that they had licensed the series for English publication beginning in Q4 2023.

No.	Original release date	Original ISBN	North American release date	North American ISBN
1	July 20, 2020	978-4-592-22331-3	September 19, 2023	978-1-9753-7053-4
Chapters 1–4
2	October 20, 2021	978-4-592-22332-0	January 23, 2024	978-1-9753-7055-8
Chapters 5–8
3	July 20, 2022	978-4-592-22333-7	May 28, 2024	978-1-9753-7057-2
Chapters 9–12; Bonus
4	July 20, 2023	978-4-592-22334-4	March 24, 2026	978-1-9753-9823-1
Chapters 13–16
5	October 18, 2024	978-4-592-22503-4	August 25, 2026	979-8-8554-2341-9
Chapters 17–20
6	July 18, 2025	978-4-592-22538-6	March 23, 2027	979-8-8554-4730-9
7	July 17, 2026	978-4-592-22588-1	—	—

== Reception ==
The series was nominated for the 10th and 11th Next Manga Awards in 2024 and 2025, respectively, in the print category and was ranked 18th in both editions.

== See also ==
- Cheeky Brat, another manga series by the same author
- Spring Storm and Monster, another manga series by the same author
