= Gokurakugai =

Japanese manga series by Yuto Sano

- First tankōbon volume cover, featuring Alma (front) and Tao (back)

極楽街(ゴクラクガイ)
- Genre: Adventure; Supernatural
- Manga
- Written by: Yuto Sano
- Published by: Shueisha
- English publisher: NA: Viz Media
- Imprint: Jump Comics SQ.
- Magazine: Jump Square
- Original run: July 4, 2022 – present
- Volumes: 6
- icon

Gokurakugai (極楽街(ゴクラクガイ); lit. 'Paradise District') is a Japanese manga series written and illustrated by Yuto Sano. It has been serialized in Shueisha's shōnen manga magazine Jump Square since July 2022. Its chapters have been collected in six tankōbon volumes as of February 2026.

== Premise ==
Tao Saotome and Alma operate the Gokurakugai Troubleshooter Agency, a problem-solving service in Gokurakugai, a working-class district inhabited by humans and beastmen. Tao is a tall woman with long braided hair, while Alma is a red-haired, fanged half-human youth. Their cases range from locating missing persons to retrieving sensitive materials for clients. However, the district faces rising unrest as disappearances multiply and mutilated animal corpses appear. During an investigation, they encounter Disaster Beasts (禍, maga)—monstrous entities that come from dead humans and animals. Their work gradually exposes the city's hidden darkness.

== Characters ==
=== Saragi ===
Alma (亜瑠馬, Aruma)
A 15-year-old half-maga, half-human hybrid. His combat powers are locked behind a stake of "karmic restraint", but he undergoes training to learn how to pull the stake by himself.
Tao Saotome (早乙女 道, Saotome Tao)
Alma's partner, a human who uses firearms shooting bullets made from Alma's blood.
Yoki Kurogane (鐵 与喜, Kurogane Yoki)
A wolf-man who is responsible for maga research and development.
Dara Kurogane (鐵 ダ羅, Kurogane Dara)
A human woman who is responsible for maga research and development.
Nei Takarai (寶 井寧, Takari Nei)
A katana-wielding human woman who is a "competitive overachiever", happy to take on more jobs than others, so that she can be praised constantly. Orphaned at the age of 6. Although at 16, she is physically younger than all the others, save Alma, she has a lot of experience and resents being called "kid".
Ryu Seno (妹尾 劉, Seno Ryū)
A human man who trained Tao and Nei before retiring; he returns to teach Alma how to remove his stake of restraint.

=== Civilians ===
Yaya Senda (仙田 弥弥, Senda Yaya) / Yaya (ヤヤ)
A young waitress at Hourai Restaurant downstairs.
Luka Kiyomina (清峰 琉鹿, Kiyomine Ryūka)
A talented artist whose family's wealth has left his isolated, socially.
Yukiharu Nishi (西 幸春, Nishi Yukiharu)
A cat-man who is Luka's first friend.
Tatsuomi Ban (馬 辰男, Tatsuomi Ban)
An information dealer who is hopelessly charmed by women he meets, including Ms. Tao. Alma and the others refer to him derogatorily as "the money-grubber", as he charges at least ¥5,000 for information, but he offers a substantial discount to his favorite women.
Isato Amadera (天寺 イサト, Amadera Isato)
A young man who caught his greedy father after he had murdered Isato's gentle grandfather for money; he meets Alma and Tao on a visit to his grandfather's grave, in a graveyard reputed to be haunted.

=== Yomi's maga family ===
Yomi (よみ)
Leader of the maga "family" who wants Alma to join them. He turns the dead into his maga by feeding them his blood; most of the time, it results in a monstrous mutation, but those who can retain their human shape are welcomed into the family.
Yoru (夜) / Jin Saotome (早乙女 ジン, Saotome Jin)
A young man who targets women, killing them by strangulation. He is an alternate, cruel personality hosted in the body of Tao's younger brother Jin, who died by hanging, and he wears a black choker to conceal the ligature scar.
Kanata (叶多)
Kanata's human host was a student who died in a hit-and-run collision during high school; as a maga, she tries to resist her hunger for human flesh, but when she is overwhelmed and cannot control her urges, she targets men who have hurt others.
Memeko (愛々子)
She wears an eye patch and stays close to Yomi.
Utsuro (枵)
A woman, nicknamed Utsu, who forms strong bonds with men easily; they then are subject to her paranoid jealousy and violence. She believes that if they die, they belong to her forever, repeating what her human host heard as a child while watching her mother stab her cheating father. Utsu's human host died from blood loss following years of self-harm, and her victims die from uncontrolled bleeding.
Chihaya
Described by Utsu as a creepy kid who is always thinking about food. His victims die by starvation.
Shizuka Kisagaya (象谷 静彁, Kisagaya Shizuka)
He kills victims with crushing force.

== Publication ==
Written and illustrated by Yuto Sano, Gokurakugai was preceded by a one-shot chapter, titled Gokurakugai Sanban-doori no Ken (極楽街三番通の件; lit. 'Paradise District's Third Avenue Incident'), published in Shueisha's shōnen manga magazine Jump SQ.Rise on January 27, 2020; the serialization started in Shueisha's Jump Square on July 4, 2022. Shueisha has collected its chapters into individual tankōbon volumes. The first volume was released on November 4, 2022. As of February 4, 2026, six volumes have been released.

Viz Media started publishing the manga digitally in English, with its first six chapters, on March 2, 2023. Viz Media began releasing the volumes in print and digital formats in April 2024.

=== Volumes ===
No.	Original release date	Original ISBN	English release date	English ISBN
1	November 4, 2022	978-4-08-882740-7	April 16, 2024	978-1-9747-4356-8
1. "The Troubleshooters of Gokurakugai" (極楽街の解決屋, Gokurakugai no Kaiketsu-ya); 2. "Home" (ホーム, Hōmu); 3. "A Dud" (ハズレ, Hazure)
Ms. Tao and Alma operate a "troubleshooting agency" on the second floor of the Hourai Restaurant, working as private detectives in Gokurakugai, a bustling district which physically resembles Yokohama Chinatown. Alma catches Luka Kiyomina, scion of a zaibatsu, in the act of drawing graffiti on the walls of their building; Luka engages the duo to help him find his friend Yuki, a cat-man who was the first to accept and praise Luka's graphical talents. That night, Luka finds Yuki, but when Yuki is nearly eaten by a maga taking the form of a two-headed monster, which apparently has been responsible for killing and eating local strays, gun-wielding Ms. Tao and half-maga Alma rescue them. As thanks, Luka gifts them an updated sign for their agency, which is a public cover for their anti-maga organization, named Saragi (蛇穴), where Alma has his blood drawn for research. Their first mission after returning involves a boy named Isato, and a maga that used his father's body; after that, they tackle a serial killer case where each victim, all women, were strangled and then hung by the neck. At a shrine, multiple maga appear, but they pose no real challenge. Later that night, while returning from a shopping trip, Alma meets a mysterious man.
2	April 4, 2023	978-4-08-883462-7	June 18, 2024	978-1-9747-4579-1
4. "Ignorance is Bliss" (知らぬが仏, Shiranu ga Hotoke); 5. "Nei the Child Prodigy" (寧馨児, Nei Kōji) 5.1. "A Day Off" (忙中有閑, Bōchū Yūkan); 6. "Young Girl's Yearning" (少女の憧憬, Shōjo no Dōkei)
The man, named Yoru, turns out to be timid and Alma bullies him into accepting a taiyaki. As Yoru eats it, his boss, Mr. Yomi, arrives and explains that Alma is their target; Yomi plans to wait until Alma feels secure, then will take everything away. Two women approach the pair and become the next victims of the strangler, revealed to be Yoru, who then tries to force a pill down their throats to turn them into maga, but the women are unsuitable. At Saragi, Tao and Alma are idle because Nei, a "competitive overachiever", has been taking and completing all the jobs; Nei hijacks the next job, going to the Sakaemachi shopping district with Alma. Nei baits the maga with her own blood, which she says is particularly tasty, and Alma learns he cannot pull the stake of karmic restraint to unleash his power without permission from Tao. On their day off, Luka and Yuki come to visit Tao and Alma, and when Alma learns Tatsuomi has a takoyaki grill, convinces him to bring it over. A new serial killer has appeared, targeting men who had assaulted women, causing them to die by shock and blood loss as they were gnawed alive. Alma runs into a starving young woman, Kanata, and he treats her to a meal several days in a row; they bond over a scowling calico cat character, Michelangelo (Miche), from the show Shijimi-san. Alone, after a man threatens her, she bites his palm to escape.
3	December 4, 2023	978-4-08-883725-3	November 19, 2024	978-1-9747-4976-8
7. "Groan" (呻吟, Shingin); 8. "Encounter and Rampage" (遭逢と暴走, Sōhō to Bōsō); 9. "The Person Who Made It Happen" (叶えてくれた人, Kanaete Kureta Hito); 10. "Salvation" (救い, Sukui); 11. "Boozer" (飲兵衛, Nonbee); 12. "Boiling Mad" (怒髪衝天, Dohatsu Shōten); 13. "Reunion" (再会, Saikai)
When Tao is called away on another mission, Alma realizes that Kanata is the cannibal and tracks her to the train station; she tries to push him away, fearing she may eat him. He says her actions have been noble and they make plans to return to Tao, but she bites Alma after they are surprised by the man she bit earlier. Mr. Yomi shows up and pulls out Alma's stake; Kanata thanks Alma as he ends her undead life. Yomi leaves after Tao and Nei return to defend Alma. Tao reassures Alma that he sent Kanata to a peaceful rest; Alma says he will learn to pull his own restraint, and Yoki assigns the drunken legend Ryu to be his tutor. Ryu correctly perceives that Alma fears losing control, due to a rampage two years ago which Tao stopped, and tells him to control his maga blood, instead of surrendering to it. Nei comes to spar with Alma and her anger is sparked by Alma's obvious lack of confidence and fears of disappointing his teammates. For the first time, he is able to pull his own stake out, but quickly learns he next must build his combat stamina. Tao confronts the dark-haired strangler Yoru and calls him Jin.
4	September 4, 2024	978-4-08-884042-0	September 2, 2025	978-1-9747-5835-7
14. "Tis Folly to Be Wise" (知るが煩悩, Shiru ga Bon'nō); 15. "'Hesitation" (逡巡, Shunjun); 16. "Tons of Trouble" (多事多難, Tasatsu Tanan); 17. "Cute Girlfriend" (キュートな彼女, Kyūtona Kanojo); 18. "Girl Trouble" (女難, Jonan); 19. "Let's Make a Suicide Pact" (重度な恋情, Jūdona Renjō)
He acknowledges Tao as his older sister but says he now is Yoru, after Jin died. In a flashback, their broken family included a father who sold off their mother when Tao was 10; five years later, her father offers her to bill collectors, but she joins a shadowy organization instead to earn money and protect her younger brother Jin. When she tries to quit, she is imprisoned but escapes by cutting off her left arm, returning home only to find Jin's body. Yoru says he killed their father, then lost control and when Jin resurfaced, hung himself out of remorse, blaming Tao for Jin's death. As she hesitates, Alma steps in and strikes Yoru; after their fight, Yoru escapes through a maga gate. Afterward, Tao vows to save Jin by killing Yoru. Tatsuomi arrives at Saragi with new, strange deaths: uncontrolled hemorrhaging, starvation, and crushing injuries; Tao speculates their abilities may be related to how those maga died. Working off his tab, Alma delivers an order to Mako Maki for Hourai; when he is called back a few days later, Alma saves him from his jealous girlfriend Utsuro, who promptly switches her attention to Alma. Mako confesses his love and starts bleeding from every orifice. Days later, she shows up at Hourai to tell Alma she loves him, growing jealous of Tao, Dara, and Yaya, but Alma's indifferent response causes her to self-harm, which stops when he agrees to go out on a date. Tao finds Mako's body. When Alma continues to refuse Utsu's love at the end of their date, she stabs him and takes a ring which he wears on a chain around her neck because it reminds her of Yomi. He pulls the stake out and starts fighting back.
5	May 2, 2025	978-4-08-884290-5	April 7, 2026	978-1-9747-6244-6
20. "Take My Love!" (愛を喰らえ!, Ai o Kurae!); 21. "Family" (家族, Kazoku); 22. "The Case of Mysterious Deaths at a Certain Mansion" (とある屋敷の連続不審死事件, To aru Yashiki no Renzoku Fushinshi Jiken); 23. "Family Killer" (仇, Kyū); 24. "Why?" (どうして, Dōshite); 25. "Relation" (縁由, En'yu)
Tao instructed Alma to capture the next maga alive for information about Yomi. By diluting Utsu's blood with water, Alma manages to hold her long enough for Tao to arrive and stake her. At Saragi, Alma is called to interrogate her and in an unsparing manner, calls her too self-absorbed to be worthy of attention, deepening her infatuation. After accepting a death by crushing case, Alma and Tao arrive at the scene, an abandoned mansion, meeting Nei there by chance. It belongs to Nei, the sole survivor of an unexplained accident that killed six people, including her immediate family and their servants, ten years ago, and she stops by occasionally. Nei joins the two and they enter to find maga pouring out of gates; Nei goes upstairs to find Shizuka Kisagaya, a scarred man who confesses to the decade-old murders. When they fight, he literally crushes her and walks away. In a flashback, Shizuka was kicked out of the mansion after arguing with Nei's father; Nei stopped him at the gates and sewed a patch over a tear in his coat. Later, one day after school, she is kidnapped by Shizuka's associates, who plan to double-cross him by selling her after extorting a ransom from her parents, but they are stopped by Shizuka.
6	February 4, 2026	978-4-08-884795-5	January 5, 2027	978-1-9747-6972-8
26. "Agony" (煩悶, Hanmon); 27. "The Snake Pit" (蛇の穴, Hebi no Ana); 28. "Alarm Bells" (警鐘, Keishō); 29. "Empty Soul" (枵心, Kōshin); 30. "Devotion" (挺身, Teishin); 31. "Because You Looked at Me" (「見てくれたから」, "Mite Kureta Kara"); 32. "Test Shot" (様撃, Yōgeki)
Shizuka returns Nei after her father pays a ransom. The next time she sees him, he has crushed everyone in the household and tells her to defeat him. She awakens at Saragi, intent on revenge, but is stopped by Tao and Alma, who make her realize her chosen family is in Saragi. Yomi asks how Shizuka's visit to his parents' home went. While Alma runs errands at Saragi, Yoki shows a new gun to Tao made from Alma's blood, which is too toxic for humans to touch. Chihaya invades Saragi via maga gate and releases Utsuro. Chihaya pulls her stake and Utsu regenerates, but refuses to leave without Alma, so Chihaya commands Misao to kill her. As Misao strikes, Alma intervenes and vows to save Utsuro. Misao suffers from migraines, a hereditary trait; although Alma temporarily subdues him, he breaks loose. Utsu blocks an explosive attack meant for Alma and dies. Alma and Misao trade wild blows and with a mighty swing, Alma cleaves Misao in half. Elsewhere, Chihaya calls Misao useless and continues his mission. Tao fights with a strong guy; pushed to the limit, she shoots him with the enhanced bullets using her non-dominant hand at point blank range.

=== Chapters not yet in tankōbon format ===
These chapters have yet to be published in a tankōbon volume.

33. "Lone Wolf" (孤狼, Korō)
34. "Crushing Victory" (鎧袖一触, Gaishū Isshoku)
35. "Golden Child"
36. "Starving Brat"
37. "Determination"

== Reception ==
By February 2026, the manga had over 1.4 million copies in circulation. The series ranked ninth in the 2023 Next Manga Award in the print manga category. It was also ranked seventh and won the U-Next Award in the 2025 edition in the same category. It placed tenth in the seventh Tsutaya Comic Award in 2023. It ranked fifth in the Nationwide Bookstore Employees' Recommended Comics of 2024 list. It ranked seventh in AnimeJapan's "Manga We Want to See Animated" poll in 2025; it ranked ninth in the same poll the following year.

In North America, the first volume ranked 20th on Circana BookScan's monthly top 20 adult graphic novels list of April 2024.
