= Promise Cinderella =

Japanese manga series

- First tankōbon volume cover

プロミス・シンデレラ (Puromisu Shinderera)
- Genre: Romantic comedy
- Manga
- Written by: Oreco Tachibana
- Published by: Shogakukan
- English publisher: NA: Comikey (digital)
- Imprint: Ura Sunday Jyoshibu
- Magazine: MangaONE; Ura Sunday
- Original run: January 1, 2018 – March 21, 2022
- Volumes: 16
- Manga

Batsu Ichi Arasā Joshi to Danshi Kōkōsei
- Written by: Oreco Tachibana
- Published by: Shogakukan
- Imprint: Ura Sunday Jyoshibu
- Magazine: Ura Sunday
- Original run: June 11, 2018 – present
- Volumes: 1
- Television drama
- Directed by: Shōsuke Murakami; Junichi Tsuzuki; Shinichi Kitabō
- Produced by: Fumi Hashimoto; Daichi Hisamatsu
- Written by: Kazunao Furuya
- Music by: Yutaka Yamada
- Studio: TBS TV; Kyodo Television
- Licensed by: Viki
- Original network: TBS
- Original run: July 13, 2021 – September 14, 2021
- Episodes: 10
- icon

Promise Cinderella (Japanese: プロミス・シンデレラ, Hepburn: Puromisu Shinderera) is a Japanese manga series written and illustrated by Oreco Tachibana. It was serialized in Shogakukan's Ura Sunday website and MangaONE app from January 2018 to March 2022, with its chapters collected into 16 tankōbon volumes. A television drama adaptation aired from July to September 2021.

== Media ==
=== Manga ===
Written and illustrated by Oreco Tachibana, Promise Cinderella began serialization in Shogakukan's MangaONE app on January 1, 2018. It started in the Ura Sunday website a week later, on January 8. The series ended serialization on March 21, 2022. Shogakukan has collected its chapters into 16 tankōbon volumes, released from June 2018 to August 2022. In July 2021, Comikey announced that it had licensed the series for an English digital release.

A spin-off manga titled Batsu Ichi Arasā Joshi to Danshi Kōkōsei (#バツイチアラサー女子と男子高校生) began serialization on the Pixiv Comic service on June 11, 2018. The first tankōbon volume was released on February 12, 2019.

==== Volumes ====
| No. | Japanese release date | Japanese ISBN |
|---|---|---|
| 1 | June 12, 2018 | 978-4-09-128318-4 |
| 2 | September 12, 2018 | 978-4-09-128518-8 |
| 3 | February 12, 2019 | 978-4-09-128832-5 |
| 4 | May 17, 2019 | 978-4-09-129213-1 |
| 5 | September 19, 2019 | 978-4-09-129400-5 |
| 6 | February 12, 2020 | 978-4-09-129583-5 |
| 7 | May 19, 2020 | 978-4-09-850119-9 |
| 8 | August 19, 2020 | 978-4-09-850224-0 |
| 9 | November 12, 2020 | 978-4-09-850331-5 |
| 10 | January 19, 2021 | 978-4-09-850437-4 |
| 11 | May 12, 2021 | 978-4-09-850573-9 |
| 12 | July 12, 2021 | 978-4-09-850621-7 |
| 13 | August 11, 2021 | 978-4-09-850667-5 |
| 14 | December 10, 2021 | 978-4-09-850835-8 |
| 15 | April 12, 2022 | 978-4-09-851071-9 |
| 16 | August 19, 2022 | 978-4-09-851239-3 |

=== Drama ===
In May 2021, a television drama adaptation was announced, starring Fumi Nikaido as Hayame Katsuragi. It was directed Shōsuke Murakami, Junichi Tsuzuki, and Shinichi Kitabō, based on a script written by Kazunao Furuya. Fumi Hashimoto and Daichi Hisamatsu served as producers, while Yutaka Yamada composed the music. The ten-episode series aired on TBS from July 13 to September 14, 2021. LiSA performed the theme song "Hadashi no Step". Viki has licensed the series in North America.

Cinderella Complex (シンデレラ・コンプレックス), a spin-off drama series featuring an original story, was released on the Japanese streaming service Paravi during the airing of the main drama adaptation.

== Reception ==
In 2018, Promise Cinderella ranked 12th in the fourth Next Manga Awards in the web manga category. In 2020, the series was nominated in the 66th Shogakukan Manga Awards in the general category. By August 2022, the manga had over 4.7 million copies in circulation.

== See also ==
- Firefly Wedding, another manga series by the same author
