= Cheeky Brat =

Shōjo manga series

- Cover of the first volume

なまいきざかり。 (Namaiki Zakari)
- Genre: Romance
- Manga
- Written by: Mitsubachi Miyuki
- Published by: Hakusensha
- English publisher: NA: Yen Press
- Imprint: Hana to Yume Comics
- Magazine: Hana to Yume
- Original run: November 2013 – December 2021
- Volumes: 23

Cheeky Brat (Japanese: なまいきざかり。, Hepburn: Namaiki Zakari; lit. "Full Bloom Cheekiness") is a Japanese shōjo manga series by Mitsubachi Miyuki. It was serialized in the semi-monthly manga magazine Hana to Yume from November 2013 to December 2021. During the series' run, a drama CD was released with the 10th volume. A live-action short movie was released on Hakusensha's official YouTube channel to promote the release of the 12th volume.

== Plot ==
Yuki Machida, a second-year high school student, is the manager of the school's basketball team and has spent her childhood masking her emotions after years of caring for her five siblings as the eldest. During the welcoming ceremony, she meets Sho Naruse, an impudent student a year her junior who also joins the basketball team.

Day after day, Sho tests her patience with his selfish and lecherous comments. However, Yuki is in love with the basketball team's captain, Kido, who had recently gotten a girlfriend. One day, Sho finds out Yuki's feelings for Kido, to her dismay, but he supports her during times of distress. After the final match of the year, Sho admits to Yuki that he is in love with her and declares he win her over. Yuki later admits her feelings for Sho and they become a couple. They both attend Osaki University after graduating from high school. Sho continues to play college basketball and Yuki begins managing the team.

== Characters ==
=== Main characters ===
Yuki Machida (町田 由希, Machida Yuki)
Voiced by: Yoshino Nanjō (drama CD); Kaho Mizutani (short movie)
Yuki is a second-year high school student and the manager of the basketball team. She is cool-headed and masks her emotions, traits she learned from taking care of her five younger siblings since youth, but she becomes flustered when it comes to Sho. The basketball team values her for being diligent and organized. She later falls in love with Naruse and begins a relationship with him. After graduating from high school she attends Osaki university and majors in sports science.
Sho Naruse (成瀬 翔, Naruse Shō)
Voiced by: Takuya Sato (drama CD); Ikumi Isaka (short movie)
Sho is a first-year high school student and a member of the basketball team. He instantly falls for Yuki despite his popularity with the girls, and though his immaturity clashes with her more responsible habits, he becomes persistent in winning her over. They begin dating after Yuki confesses to him. He joins the same university as Yuki after graduating from high school and continues playing college basketball.

=== Ryuhoku High School ===
Kido (木戸)
Kido is a third-year high school student and is the captain of the basketball team. Yuki at first has feelings for him, but he and Rina begin dating. He graduates after the final match of the year and starts attending university.
Rina Hashino (橋野 リナ, Hashino Rina)
Rina is a third-year-high school student and Kido's bubbly girlfriend.
Arisa Ichii (市井 ありさ, Ichii Arisa)
Arisa is a close friend of Sho's and attended the same junior high school. She has a strong personality and speaks her mind. She has been in love with Sho for a long time, but she later comes to accept his feelings for Yuki.

=== Misuzu Academy ===
Shizuka Hakamada (袴田 静, Hakamada Shizuka)
Voiced by: Yūki Ono (drama CD)
Shizuka is Sho's childhood friend and had attended the same elementary school before relocating to Kyushu. He considers Sho his rival and is motivated to perform well at basketball to defeat him. Though Shizuka has trouble talking to women, he becomes attracted to Yuki and falls in love with her. After graduating Misuzu Academy, he attends the same college as Yuki and Sho. He joins the college basketball team along with Sho. After realising that Yuki will never return his feelings he gives up on her and encourages Yuki to face her feelings and resolve her issues with Sho.

=== College ===
Suwa (諏訪)
Suwa is a member of the college basketball team and works at the same convenience store as Yuki when she starts attending college. He has a reputation of a playboy and is seen with a different girl constantly; however, he becomes fascinated when Yuki shows no interest in him. He falls in love with her, but he later discovers he is mistaking his feelings for the lack of motherly affection in his own childhood after he became estranged from his mother. Suwa later becomes attracted to Usami when she sees him for his true self.
Fuka Usami (宇佐見 風香, Usami Fūka)
Usami is Yuki's next-door neighbor and Yuki's best friend who attends the same college. She is in love with Suwa and downplays his advances, believing him still to be in love with Yuki. They become a couple after Suwa declares his love for her.

== Media ==
=== Manga ===
Cheeky Brat is written and illustrated by Mitsubachi Miyuki. It was serialized in the bimonthly magazine Hana to Yume from November 2013 to December 2021. The chapters were later released in bound volumes by Hakusensha under the Hana to Yume Comics imprint. During the series' run, a drama CD was released in limited edition bundle of volume 10. Yen Press is publishing the series in English.

No.	Original release date	Original ISBN	English release date	English ISBN
1	May 20, 2014	978-4-592-21331-4	November 30, 2021	978-1-975-33435-2
2	August 20, 2014	978-4-592-21332-1	February 22, 2022	978-1-975-33437-6
3	December 19, 2014	978-4-592-21333-8	May 17, 2022	978-1-975-33439-0
4	May 20, 2015	978-4-592-21334-5	August 23, 2022	978-1-975-33441-3
5	September 18, 2015	978-4-592-21335-2	January 17, 2023	978-1-975-33443-7
6	February 19, 2016	978-4-592-21336-9	April 18, 2023	978-1-975-33445-1
7	June 20, 2016	978-4-592-21337-6	July 18, 2023	978-1-975-35988-1
8	September 20, 2016	978-4-592-21338-3	October 17, 2023	978-1-975-35990-4
9	February 20, 2017	978-4-592-21339-0	January 23, 2024	978-1-975-36198-3
10	July 20, 2017	978-4-592-21340-6 (regular edition); 978-4-592-10579-4 (limited edition with drama CD)	May 21, 2024	978-1-975-36199-0
11	November 20, 2017	978-4-592-21341-3	August 20, 2024	978-1-975-36201-0
12	February 20, 2018	978-4-592-21342-0	November 19, 2024	978-1-975-36203-4
13	June 20, 2018	978-4-592-21343-7	March 25, 2025	978-1-975-36205-8
14	October 19, 2018	978-4-592-21344-4	July 22, 2025	978-1-975-36207-2
15	February 20, 2019	978-4-592-21345-1	December 2, 2025	978-1-975-36209-6
16	June 20, 2019	978-4-592-21686-5	February 24, 2026	978-1-975-36211-9
17	October 18, 2019	978-4-592-21687-2	October 27, 2026	978-1-975-36213-3
18	February 20, 2020	978-4-592-21688-9	January 26, 2027	978-1-975-36215-7
19	July 20, 2020	978-4-592-21689-6	—	—
20	December 18, 2020	978-4-592-21690-2	—	—
21	May 20, 2021	978-4-592-22401-3	—	—
22	October 20, 2021	978-4-592-22402-0	—	—
23	March 18, 2022	978-4-592-22403-7	—	—

=== Short movie ===
A live-action short movie was released on Hakusensha's official YouTube channel on February 20, 2018, to promote the release of the 12th volume. The film starred Kaho Mizutani as Yuki and Ikumi Isaka as Sho.

== Reception ==
Volume 4 debuted at #19 on Oricon and sold 35,931 copies in its first week. Volume 5 debuted at #26 on Oricon and sold 30,424 copies in its first week, with a total of 54,763 copies sold. Volume 6 debuted at #20 on Oricon and sold 33,036 copies in its first week, with a total of 61,972 copies sold. Volume 7 debuted at #14 on Oricon and sold 55,528 copies in its first week, with a total of 56,027 copies sold. Volume 8 debuted at #14 on Oricon and sold 57,137 copies in its first week. Volume 9 debuted at #11 on Oricon and sold 60,420 copies in its first week, with a total of 61,248 copies sold. Volume 10 debuted at #16 on Oricon and sold 45,871 copies in its first week, with a total of 72,150 copies sold. Volume 11 debuted at #9 on Oricon and sold 57,595 copies in its first week, with a total of 73,899 copies sold. Volume 12 debuted at #5 on Oricon and sold 57,767 copies in its first week. Volume 13 debuted at #10 on Oricon and sold 52,213 copies in its first week, with a total of 75,408 copies sold.

== See also ==
- Spring Storm and Monster, another manga series by the same author
- Stray Cat & Wolf, another manga series by the same author
