= Our Precious Conversations =

Japanese manga series

- First tankōbon volume cover, featuring Nozomi Aizawa (right) and Shiro Azuma (left)

僕と君の大切な話 (Boku to Kimi no Taisetsu na Hanashi)
- Genre: Romantic comedy
- Manga
- Written by: Robico
- Published by: Kodansha
- English publisher: NA: Kodansha USA (digital)
- Magazine: Dessert
- Original run: August 24, 2015 – December 24, 2019
- Volumes: 7

Our Precious Conversations (Japanese: 僕と君の大切な話, Hepburn: Boku to Kimi no Taisetsu na Hanashi) is a Japanese manga series written and illustrated by Robico. It was serialized in Kodansha's manga magazine Dessert from August 2015 to December 2019, the chapters were published in seven tankōbon volumes.

In 2020, Our Precious Conversations won the 44th Kodansha Manga Award in the shōjo category.

== Plot ==
Nozomi Aizawa meets and falls in love with Shiro Azuma in their first year at Heiwadai High School. Too shy to talk to him, her feelings are kept secret until their second year, when she suddenly confesses to him at a train station. Shiro takes Nozomi's declaration of love as a joke, but from that day on the two of them start talking on the bench at the station and, eventually, at school as well.

Besides Nozomi and Shiro's ongoing love story the comic also deals with their schoolmates, including literature club president Marin Hamada, popular Kazuomi Tamaki, and Shiro's teen aunt, Suzu.

== Characters ==
Nozomi Aizawa (相沢 のぞみ, Aizawa Nozomi)
The protagonist, a student at Heiwadai High School. Regarded as a beauty with a mysterious aura at school, most students keep their distance from her and think she is cool-mannered and aloof. However, she is actually deeply emotional and kindhearted. She has a younger brother named Ryuji (龍二).
Shiro Azuma (東 司朗, Azuma Shirou)
A boy in the same grade as Nozomi at high school, though they only end up in the same class during their third year. He tends to be argumentative with others. He has four aunts, which has influenced his harsh demeanor towards women. Shiro is an avid reader and writes his own novels, and has connections with the school Literature Club, who often asks him to critique their works.
Kazuomi Tamaki (環 和臣, Tamaki Kazuomi)
The most popular boy at school, who ends up in the same class as Nozomi and Shiro in their third year. While he is handsome and well-liked by both girls and boys, he often questions his own self-worth. He develops feelings for Nozomi, but steps back when he learns she is in love with Shiro.
Marin Hamada (浜田 まりん, Hamada Marin)
The president of the Literature Club and Nozomi's best friend. While they are in the same class during their second year, they end up in different classes during the third year. Because she has a close relationship with Nozomi and cares for her, she becomes jealous of Shiro for being the one that Nozomi loves. She has difficulty socializing with others and often speaks bluntly.
Caffeine (カフェイン, Kafein)
Takuya Takahashi (高橋卓也, Takahashi Takuya) is Shiro's classmate, known by the nickname "Caffeine" because his parents met at a coffee shop. He is regarded as a "good guy" and mediates fights that happen around him. In his initial appearance, he has a girlfriend, but is dumped after he learns she has been cheating on him. He later becomes interested in Marin and they begin dating during the third semester of their second year.
Suzu Ichinomiya (一ノ宮 鈴, Ichinomiya Suzu)
Shiro's aunt, who had been a cousin of Shiro's mother who was adopted into the Ichinomiya family. She attends the same high school as Shiro and is a year older than him. She is tomboyish and strong and often treats Shiro roughly, but is actually very lonely. Shiro's childhood friend Keisuke Ito (伊藤 圭介, Ito Keisuke) has feelings for her, but she has had a crush on a teacher, Noro (野呂), since her first year.

== Publication ==
Our Precious Conversations is written and illustrated by Robico. It started serialization in Kodansha's magazine Dessert on August 24, 2015. The first tankōbon volume was released on March 11, 2016. The series went on hiatus in the July 2016 issue of Dessert, but returned in the January 2017 issue. The series concluded on December 24, 2019. The seventh and final volume was released on March 13, 2020, in both a standard and limited edition.

In May 2017, Kodansha USA started publishing the series digitally. They later started publishing the series' chapters simultaneously with the Japanese release on digital sites such as Crunchyroll Manga.

=== Volume list ===
| No. | Original release date | Original ISBN | English release date | English ISBN |
|---|---|---|---|---|
| 1 | March 11, 2016 | 978-4-06-365856-9 | May 16, 2017 | 978-1-68-233693-9 |
| 2 | March 13, 2017 | 978-4-06-365899-6 | August 8, 2017 | 978-1-68-233787-5 |
| 3 | November 13, 2017 | 978-4-06-510420-0 | July 2, 2019 | 978-1-64-212924-3 |
| 4 | July 13, 2018 | 978-4-06-512229-7 | September 3, 2019 | 978-1-64-212959-5 |
| 5 | January 11, 2019 | 978-4-06-514236-3 | November 5, 2019 | 978-1-64-212993-9 |
| 6 | August 9, 2019 | 978-4-06-516715-1 | February 4, 2020 | 978-1-64-659228-9 |
| 7 | March 13, 2020 | 978-4-06-518969-6 | October 6, 2020 | 978-1-64-659745-1 |

== Reception ==
As of January 2019, the series has 700,000 copies in print.

In the 2017 edition of Takarajimasha's Kono Manga ga Sugoi! guidebook, the series ranked eighth on the top 20 manga for female audiences list. In 2019, the series was nominated for the 43rd Kodansha Manga Award in the shōjo category. However, it lost to Rie Aruga's Perfect World. In 2020, it won the 44th Kodansha Manga Award in the shōjo category.
