= My Little Monster =

Japanese manga series

- Cover of the first manga volume, featuring main characters: Haru Yoshida (left) and Shizuku Mizutani (right).

となりの怪物くん (Tonari no Kaibutsu-kun)
- Genre: Romantic comedy
- Manga
- Written by: Robico
- Published by: Kodansha
- English publisher: NA: Kodansha USA
- Magazine: Dessert
- Original run: August 23, 2008 – June 24, 2013
- Volumes: 12 + 1 special volume
- Anime television series
- Directed by: Hiro Kaburaki
- Written by: Noboru Takagi
- Music by: Masato Nakayama
- Studio: Brain's Base
- Licensed by: NA: NIS America (home video) Sentai Filmworks (streaming) Remow
- Original network: TV Tokyo, TVO, TVh, TSC, TVA, TVQ
- English network: SEA: Animax Asia
- Original run: October 2, 2012 – December 25, 2012
- Episodes: 13 + OVA
- Live-action film
- Directed by: Sho Tsukikawa
- Written by: Arisa Kaneko
- Music by: Yuki Hayashi
- Studio: Toho
- Released: April 27, 2018
- icon

My Little Monster (Japanese: となりの怪物くん, Hepburn: Tonari no Kaibutsu-kun; lit. "The Monster Sitting Beside Me") is a Japanese manga written and illustrated by Robico about the relationship between a girl named Shizuku Mizutani and a boy named Haru Yoshida. It was serialized in Kodansha's Dessert magazine from August 23, 2008, to June 24, 2013. An anime adaptation by Brain's Base aired from October 2 to December 25, 2012. It was licensed by Crunchyroll during the original run.

== Plot ==
My Little Monster focuses on the relationship between Shizuku Mizutani, who has absolutely no interests except in studying and her plans for the future, and a boy named Haru Yoshida, who sits next to Shizuku in class but rarely attends school. After Shizuku is tasked with delivering class printouts to Haru's home, she meets Haru, who immediately greets her as a friend, starting their new relationship. Nicknamed "dry ice," Shizuku is renowned as a girl who is emotionless and cold. However, when she meets Haru she is touched by his innocence and his lack of knowledge concerning human relationships. Though known as a violent and uncontrollable monster, Haru is actually kind and gentle. Haru immediately declares his love towards Shizuku, but it takes much longer for Shizuku to realize and accept her own feelings towards Haru. Together, as two previously antisocial beings, they help each other learn how to care for one another and relate with their friends and family.

== Characters ==
=== Main characters ===
Shizuku Mizutani (水谷 雫, Mizutani Shizuku)
Voiced by: Mariya Ise (drama CD), Haruka Tomatsu (anime)
Played by: Tao Tsuchiya
Shizuku is a high school girl who focuses all her time on academics so she can have a future career with a 10 million yen annual income.^{Ch. 1} She is considered cold by many for her no-nonsense and blunt attitude, and has no friends. After encountering Haru, she starts expressing more of her emotions, standing up to situations seem wrong like when Haru had been used by his alleged friends for money. Although she is bothered by Haru and his antics, some of which are romantic gestures towards her, she develops feelings for him. She is proud of being number one in her class, but after meeting Haru, whom she thought would be her academic rival, she no longer enjoys the thrill of being top of the list. Her classmate Asako Natsume calls her "Mitty" (ミッティ, Mitti) and becomes her first female friend.^{Vol. 1} Although she styles her hair in pigtails and dresses rather plainly, preferring wool underwear and clothing she gets from sales from retail stores, there are occasions where she has let her hair down, although Haru prefers the tails because he would be unable to find her.^{Vol. 10}
Throughout the story, Shizuku often questions why she is attracted to Haru and likes him so much. In the manga, she admits to Haru she was jealous of his personality, and he will never understand her feelings. When Haru runs away, she blames herself for it. However, when he returns, he wants her to share to him her feelings. Haru tells her he is going away for a year, so she is without him for her third year of high school. Nevertheless, she stills remains loyal to Haru and continues on with her life. She marries Haru after college, and there is a teaser at the end of the manga shows her working at a legal agency ^{Vol. 13}
Haru Yoshida (吉田 春, Yoshida Haru)
Voiced by: Kenichi Suzumura (drama CD), Tatsuhisa Suzuki (anime)
Played by: Masaki Suda
Haru, the title character, has a reputation of being a trouble maker, having been suspended from school for getting in a scuffle with schoolmates, and staying away from school even after the suspension was lifted. When he meets Shizuku, the first schoolmate to ever do something for him, he immediately considers her his first real friend and does many antics to be with her, following her around at school, and pulling her away from her routine life. He tells her he likes her and might even be in love with her, which often flusters Shizuku. He has a spontaneous and carefree personality and often takes his frustrations out physically on other people. Academically, he is very smart, having entered high school as the top-ranked student but skipping out on the entrance ceremony,^{Ch. 2} having studied most of the high school curriculum while he was sitting out most of middle school,^{Ch. 7} and frequently topping the school's exam scores, much to Shizuku's frustration. He has a rooster named Nagoya (名古屋), later bringing and housing it in school (with the reluctant approval from his teacher).^{Vol. 1}
He cares for Shizuku deeply, and gets jealous of Yamaken's interactions with Shizuku. Later on, he and Shizuku end up in different classes for their second-year of high school, but this does not change their romantic intimacy. He shuns his father's rich and famous family background, and went to live with his aunt Kyoko (Mitchan's mother), who had been cast out of the family when she eloped. It was through Kyoko that he started learning how to find someone to love. When he attends his brother Yuzan's birthday party with the socialites, he and Shizuku have a falling out and he stops attending Shizuku's school.^{Vol. 10} Haru eventually comes back and reconciles with Shizuku. He then takes the entirety of the third year off to work with his aunt's research group and also as a deep sea fisherman. In the final chapters, after Shizuku graduated from college, he and Shizuku get married.^{Vol. 13}

=== Supporting characters ===
Mitsuyoshi Misawa (三沢 満善, Misawa Mitsuyoshi)
Voiced by: Daisuke Ono (drama CD), Tomoyuki Higuchi (anime)
Played by: Mocomichi Hayami
Haru's cousin, nicknamed "Mitchan" (みっちゃん, Micchan), who runs a batting cage center. He looks after Haru since his place is near Haru's school.^{Ch. 1, 6} He often comforts and encourages Asako about her situations, but when Asako develops a crush on him, he turns down her confession because of their difference in age. Haru notes that Mitchan can be clueless about relationships sometimes as he once did not realize his girlfriend had dumped him until six months later.^{Ch. 17} He is always wearing sunglasses; the one time he did not, he had scared Haru because his eyes resembled Haru's father's.^{Ch. 37 extra} Mitchan's late mother, Kyoko (京子), was a scientific researcher who had taken in Haru during his junior high school years.
Kenji Yamaguchi (山口 賢二, Yamaguchi Kenji)
Voiced by: Daisuke Namikawa (drama CD), Takuma Terashima (anime)
Played by: Yuki Yamada
Haru's acquaintance, nicknamed "Yamaken" (やまけん) by his friends. He used to bother Haru for money until Shizuku stopped him,^{Vol. 1} although it is later revealed that he comes from a wealthy family. He attends the same cram school as Shizuku, and gives her helpful advice on her relationship with Haru. However, over the course of the series, he is bothered that he is increasingly attracted to Shizuku and inadvertently competing against Haru for her affections.^{Vol. 4} He eventually confesses to Shizuku, but is turned down, with Haru and Shizuku soon declaring they are a couple, though Shizuku and Yamaken remain friends. Besides his constant denial that he has a romantic interest in Shizuku, Yamaken is the subject of recurring gags of having a poor sense of direction^{Ch. 11, 19} and also fleeing on sight from Yuzan because he was beaten by him whenever he tried to bully Haru.^{Ch. 11} He first met Haru in elementary school where Haru would best him both in academics and in sports.^{Ch. 40} He attends an all-boys high school and hangs out with three guys who openly fawn over Asako Natsume, call Shizuku "Nerd Queen", and also like Chizuru. The three guys are named in volume 3: Tomio (トミオ) (Ryuji Tomioka (富岡 竜二, Tomioka Ryuji)) who has light spiky hair; Ma-Bo (マーボ) (Masahiro Ayanokoji (綾小路 昌弘, Ayanokoji Masahiro)) who has dark somewhat spiky hair and wears a baseball cap; and George (ジョージ, Joji) (Issei Jojima (城島 壱成, Jojima Issei)) who has straight hair and wears glasses.^{Vol. 3 extra} They are later revealed to come from high society backgrounds like Yamaken.^{Ch. 39}
Asako Natsume (夏目 あさ子, Natsume Asako)
Voiced by: Yuiko Tatsumi (drama CD), Atsumi Tanezaki (anime)
Played by: Elaiza Ikeda
Asako is Shizuku and Haru's classmate. Before meeting Shizuku and Haru, she did not have any friends except for some people from an online community. She initially asks Shizuku to help her study for a make-up exam and so she can attend a real-life meeting with that community; however, the meeting turns out to be a disappointment as only the guys wanted to talk with her, so she unsubscribes from it and joins a new online blog group. She treasures her friendship with "Mitty" (Shizuku),^{Ch. 3} and gets depressed whenever Shizuku turns down her interactions with her.^{Vol. 3} She develops a crush on Mitchan because he often comforts her.^{Vol. 4-5} She recalls that in her second year in middle school, she had turned down the boys' confessions 42 times in 5 days and was thus hated by her female classmates for stealing their crushes. She feels safe around Haru because he has Shizuku, and around Sasayan because he doesn't fawn over her like the other boys.^{Ch. 17} After Mitchan turns down her initial confession, Asako vows to keep trying to win his heart, until Mitchan turns her down for good.^{Vol. 7} She later spends more time talking with Sasayan but is bothered by his candid observations of her behavior and when he later mentions that he has grown to like her too.^{Vol. 9}
Sōhei Sasahara (佐々原 宗平, Sasahara Sōhei)
Voiced by: Nobuhiko Okamoto (drama CD), Ryōta Ōsaka (anime)
Played by: Gaku Sano
Shizuku and Haru's classmate is a popular boy in the baseball club who goes by the nickname "Sasayan" (ササヤン). He cares about Haru, and does not want a repeat of what happened in middle school where Haru stopped coming to school.^{Vol. 1} He can be especially blunt when it comes to his friends, such as giving Asako truthful but harsh advice about falling in love with Mitchan, and opening Haru's eyes about Shizuku's true feelings.^{Vol. 5-6} He later tells Asako that he likes her.^{Vol. 9} He had been interested in Asako since their first year in high school as he got to know her.^{Vol. 13}
Yuzan Yoshida (吉田 優山, Yoshida Yūzan)
Voiced by: Yūki Kaji (drama CD), Yūichi Nakamura (anime)
Played by: Yuki Furukawa
Haru's older brother, whom Haru seems to dislike and tries to avoid. At first, he tells Shizuku that he has come to take Haru home upon their father's request, but after seeing that Haru attends school because of Shizuku, he agrees to let him stay. Although he is popular with the ladies, he is shy and inexperienced with women and often is a bit terrified when they make advances on him.^{Vol. 2, 9, 10} Haru and Yamaken often flee from him when they see him in the area. Yuzan and Haru's mother had divorced their father when they were young and then she later abandoned her children. Their father, Taizo Yoshida (吉田 泰造, Yoshida Taizo), is a prominent politician notorious for womanizing and is currently remarried to a woman named Michiru (みちる). Yuzan and Haru returned to their father's family when Yuzan was around ten years old and Haru was seven. Unlike Haru, he decided to adapt to the Yoshida society lifestyle.^{Vol. 9, 10} Though he initially hoped to create a place where he and Haru could belong, he began to resent how he was ignored in favour of Haru, who was unable to adjust to their father's household. Throughout the series he tries to interact with Shizuku, and give his advice about relationships. In the final volume's bonus story, he goes on a date with Iyo, which is cut short by Yamaken. Yuzan later also decides to pursue a future in politics.^{Vol. 13}
Chizuru Oshima (大島 千づる, Ōshima Chizuru)
Voiced by: Saori Hayami (drama CD), Kana Hanazawa (anime)
Played by: Minami Hamabe
Chizuru is a glasses-wearing representative for the neighboring class 1-A. She was helped by Haru after he beat up an upperclassman who was bullying her.^{Ch. 6} She is very shy, a little pessimistic and anxious. Even though she has a crush on Haru, she usually finds herself putting aside her own feelings to give him advice towards his relationship with Shizuku.^{Ch. 7-10} Before starting high school, she was out sick for a week, and was unable to make friends when she came back, but many of the boys find her cute.^{Ch. 8} She eventually confesses properly to Haru and is formally turned down. She and Haru are put in the same class for their second year of high school. In the final volume, she works as a student teacher, and is courted by Shizuku's little brother Takaya who has fallen in love with her.^{Vol. 13}
Yu Miyama (宮間 有, Miyama Yū)
Voiced by: Kana Asumi (drama CD), Sayuri Yahagi (anime)
Yu is Chizuru's friend from middle school and helps Chizuru get closer to Haru. She is a petite girl (Yamaken's friends nickname her "Tiny") with a bob cut who attends Otowa Girls High.^{Ch. 20} She had met her boyfriend Tokita (時田) in middle school when she was 15, and accepted his confession the day he was moving outside the area. They play online games like Monster Hunter together every day.^{Ch. 22} They vow to go to the same college.^{Vol. 12}
Takashi Mizutani (水谷 隆司, Mizutani Takashi)
Voiced by: Takehito Koyasu
Shizuku's father is usually the one who is taking care of Shizuku and her brother Takaya ever since his wife began living away in order to work. He runs a shop but it has gone bankrupt six times, so his wife has had to work more in order to bail him out.^{Ch. 13} He later gets a part-time job with another shop.
Takaya Mizutani (水谷 隆也, Mizutani Takaya)
Voiced by: Ayumu Murase
Shizuku's little brother who has the same serious disposition and is mostly quiet.^{Ch. 22} His hobby is collecting pictures on the Internet.^{Vol. 10 extra} Shizuku would often let him go play with friends so he could be social. He also shares his love for sweets with Yuzan. He grows up to be fairly tall in high school. He falls in love with Chizuru in middle school and high school when she was working as a student teacher. Although he stops briefly when Chizuru mentioned she had a boyfriend, Takaya later confesses his love for her and claims he will not give up.^{Vol. 13}
Yoshino Mizutani (水谷 吉野, Mizutani Yoshino)
Shizuku's mother lives apart from her family because of her work as the breadwinner of the family.^{Ch. 13} Shizuku looks up to her as how she wants to be growing up, and would often give status reports of her academic progress in her talks with her. However, Shizuku often hesitates to talk to her mother out of fear that her personal issues are too trivial to bother her mother with. When Shizuku tells her that she likes a boy but doesn't know what to do about that and school, Yoshino encourages Shizuku to double her efforts so she can do both.^{Vol. 6-7} She also appears briefly at Yuzan's birthday party, where she had fended off a pass from Taizo Yoshida.^{Ch. 39}
Takuma Ando (安藤 拓真, Ando Takuma)
Voiced by: Masayuki Katō (OAD)
The young Yoshida family butler and third secretary to Taizo Yoshida. He looks after Yuzan and starts following Haru, being involved in his life after the latter had visited the family prior to the start of Haru's second year.^{Vol. 8} He tries to pick up girls for Yuzan and sometimes for himself.^{Vol. 9} At Yuzan's birthday party, he tries to eat as much as he can.^{Vol. 10} He doesn't like sweets, but is often forced to eat desserts by Yuzan, much to Ando's consternation. He later becomes the manager of Yuzan's political career.
Iyo Yamaguchi (山口 伊代, Yamaguchi Iyo)
Voiced by: Yū Kobayashi (drama CD)
Kenji's younger sister. She is a first-year student who attends Shizuku and Haru's school when the main group is starting their second year. She is tall, has short blond hair, and is fairly reserved. She is aware of her good looks and uses it to prove a point sometimes. She falls in love with Haru, immediately thinking of him as "cool" upon first meeting. Iyo refers to herself in third person. Robico's early notes describe Iyo as "an annoyingly cocky but shy girl who desperately wants attention."^{Vol. 8} She also develops a crush on Yuzan, whom she calls her Moebius.^{Vol. 9} In the bonus chapter at the end of the series, she goes on a date with Yuzan, but her brother drags her away and yells at her for her "terrible taste in men". However, she wishes for her and her brother to find love with someone who would not reject them.^{Vol. 13}

== Media ==
=== Manga ===
The manga series is written and illustrated by Robico and published in the Kodansha magazine Dessert. It was serialized between the September 2008 issue, published on August 23, 2008, and the August 2013 issue, published on June 24, 2013. The series has also been released in 12 tankōbon volumes between January 13, 2009, and August 12, 2013. A limited-edition version of the final volume was bundled with an OVA episode of the anime series on DVD. The series has been licensed in North America by Kodansha USA, who released the first volume on March 11, 2014. A spin-off manga series was published in Dessert between August 24 and November 22, 2013. Its chapters were collected in a 13th volume, released on January 10, 2014.

==== Volumes ====
No.	Original release date	Original ISBN	English release date	English ISBN
1	January 13, 2009	978-4-06-365540-7	March 11, 2014	978-1-61262-597-3
1. My Classmate Yoshida-kun; 2. I Don't Hate You; 3. Weird; 4. Nuisance
High school student ace Shizuku Mizutani has been studying hard so she can have a well-paying career in the future. When she brings school printouts to Haru Yoshida, a classmate who has not been attending since being suspended earlier in the year, but is surprised when he runs away. However, he comes back and pulls her aside multiple times for activities such as playing with animals or eating out, and asks her if school is fun. Seeing Shizuku as his new friend, he returns to school, sits next to her in class, and hangs out with her. Shizuku confronts Haru about being tricked by a group of guys who only hang out with him because he gives them money. Classmate Asako Natsume asks Shizuku to tutor her so she can pass the make-up exam and meet some friends that she knows from an Internet group. Shizuku finds that she is thinking of Haru a lot more. She confesses her love to him, but soon waffles on the statement. When Haru states his love for her may be different, she vows to win him over in a different way. Haru, Asako, Shizuku, and classmate Sōhei "Sasayan" Sasahara get parts to make a home for Haru's pet chicken Nagoya, but get into trouble when they run into Haru's former money-extorting friends.
2	June 12, 2009	978-4-06-365555-1	May 27, 2014	978-1-61262-598-0
5. Breakthrough; 6. It's Summer Vacation; 7. Yoshida-kun's Family Situation; 8. Dark Days for Two Girls
When Haru discovers his brother Yuzan is visiting, he stays over at Shizuku's house. At school, Shizuku notices Haru scares people with his glaring, so she suggests he act more friendly and smile, which soon makes him really popular with the girls. Haru saves the shy class representative Chizuru Oshima from being bullied by some seniors. Haru and Asako take Shizuku to the beach. Later, Haru's cousin Mitchan and Sasayan take the group to go fishing. Shizuku meets Yuzan, who wants Haru to return to their home instead of staying at Mitchan's, but after seeing that Haru is actually attending school because of Shizuku, he leaves Haru in her care. When the gang try to brainstorm ways to make Chizuru more social, Haru and Shizuku start arguing and then ignore each other. Although Chizuru is attracted to Haru, when she sees he and Shizuku are still on bad terms, she decides she has had enough and yells at them to stop behaving like that.
3	October 13, 2009	978-4-06-365575-9	July 29, 2014	978-1-61262-599-7
9. I Like You; 10. The Distance Between Them; 11. C'mon in! Shoyo Festival Part 1; 12. C'mon in! Shoyo Festival Part 2
Haru and Shizuku have a somewhat uncomfortable study date as they sort their feelings for each other. Haru confides with class rep Oshima, but Asako tells him to confess to Shizuku that he likes her, which he does. Later, Shizuku is bothered by Haru's attempts to touch her or be close to her. They are called by their class to try to secure a good location for their festival booth. Shizuku finds that Yamaken attends the same cram school as her. The day of the festival, Yamaken's friends visit Haru at the haunted house. Yamaken finds Shizuku on a break, but when Haru sees them together, he tries to slug Yamaken but accidentally hits Shizuku, after which Shizuku tells Haru to stay away from her. Shizuku is puzzled as to why she can't cut Haru off, at which Asako and then Yamaken offer their advice. Haru confides with Oshima, asking what she would do if he told her he liked her. Mitchan consoles Asako who thinks Shizuku doesn't want to be her friend anymore. Eventually, Shizuku and Haru are able to mend their relationships with each other and their friends.
4	February 12, 2010	978-4-06-365590-2	September 16, 2014	978-1-61262-600-0
13. Zero or One; 14. Christmas; 15. Kenji-kun, the Yamaguchis' Boy; 16. The Year Comes to a Close; Bonus manga: chapter 16.5: When the New Year's Bell Stops Ringing
Haru tries to advance his relationship with Shizuku by offering to catch a fish when Shizuku mentions that she once had thoughts of keeping one. At the library, Shizuku thanks Yamaken for his earlier advice, but Yamaken starts wondering if he's unintentionally developing feelings for Shizuku. Asako tries to hide from some girls but when Mitchan arrives to save her, she starts to act nervous and shy around him later. When Haru asks Yamaken if he has a crush on Shizuku, Yamaken asks if he would have a problem with that, which makes Haru jealous. At Asako's Christmas party, he learns Yamaken and Shizuku are taking winter cram school classes together. Asako becomes lonely during New Year's that she hangs out with Shizuku and Haru. They go to temple for New Year's where they see everyone. When Mitchan gives her some more words of comfort, she replies vaguely that she would like to be in a relationship with Mitchan.
5	July 13, 2010	978-4-06-365613-8	November 18, 2014	978-1-61262-601-7
17. Natsume-san's Story; 18. A Dubious Day Off; 19. Probably a Date; 20. Two Days, One Night
Asako shares with Shizuku and Chizuru about how she wasn't able to have friends in middle school. After mistaking more of Mitchan's friendly gestures as romantic, Asako confesses her love to Mitchan, but when he turns her down, Asako resolves to work harder. Haru surprises Shizuku by saying he wants to kiss, but then leaves. Mitchan, Yuzan and Haru visit Mitchan's mother's gravesite, where Haru is reminded of her relationship advice. Yamaken, who was lost in town again, spends the afternoon with Shizuku, who later decides that she should do something with Haru's interests in mind. With Yamaken's friend providing accommodations, the gang go a ski resort, along with Chizuru and Yu. Sasayan suggests Haru restrain himself from barging in on a private conversation between Shizuku and Yamaken.
6	December 13, 2010	978-4-06-365632-9	January 20, 2015	978-1-61262-800-4
21. Sasayan and Haru; 22. Les Filles Cuisinent le Chocolat; 23. Birthday (Part One); 24. Birthday (Part Two)
Since their arguing over Haru and Shizuku's relationship at the ski trip, Asako and Sasayan have been on hostile terms with each other. Sasayan invites Haru to join his friends for the day. After each of them talks with Haru and Mitchan, the two reconcile. For Valentine's Day, which is also Shizuku's birthday, Shizuku, Asako, Chizuru and Yu make chocolates at Shizuku's house. Yu tells Chizuru to be honest with herself, and Chizuru eventually tells Shizuku that she made chocolate for Haru. On Valentine's, Haru asks Chizuru advice for what birthday gift to give to Shizuku and they go shopping. Chizuru gives Haru the chocolate and wishes him good luck. Shizuku starts to feel jealous that Chizuru likes Haru, but is sad that her mother is unable to come back from work to attend her birthday. Sasayan finds Asako sulking a bit after she gave her chocolate to Mitchan. Haru visits and celebrates with Shizuku's family, and afterwards encourages her to call her mom. Shizuku kisses Haru and tells him she loves him.
7	May 13, 2011	978-4-06-365650-3	March 17, 2015	978-1-61262-991-9
25. A Couple in Love; 26. The End of a Year; 27. Taking a Spring Break; 28. Haru
Shizuku's mom tells Shizuku to put in extra effort on both the relationship and her studies. Chizuru asks Haru for a reply to her confession, but Haru runs away, realizing that she likes him. Asako, who was planning to meet with Shizuku to study for her make-up finals, meets Mitchan who formally rejects her confession. Haru gets upset, and he and Mitchan fight. Haru then formally turns down Chizuru. Shizuku comforts Asako. With Haru out visiting his family, Yamaken spends the day with Shizuku and tries to get her to get a cell phone. At the start of the second school year, Shizuku and Haru are placed in separate classes. Haru and Chizuru agree to go back to being friends.
8	October 13, 2011	978-4-06-365668-8	May 19, 2015	978-1-61262-992-6
29. The First Step; 30. Getting Somewhere; 31. Happy Paradise; 32. Summer Vacation: The Sequel, Part 1
Shizuku takes Haru out to celebrate his birthday, but Haru is bothered that he got a study guide as a birthday gift. Asako befriends Iyo, a beautiful and shy first-year student, but discovers she is Yamaken's younger sister, and that she has developed a crush on Haru. After more prodding by the jealous Haru, Yamaken formally confesses to Shizuku, who is shocked as she had always thought of him as a friend. Haru later confesses to Shizuku and they officially become a couple. Iyo invites the gang to camping with her but the site is also being used by her brother.
9	March 13, 2012	978-4-06-365685-5	July 21, 2015	978-1-61262-993-3
33. Summer Vacation: The Sequel, Part 2; 34. Summer Vacation: The Sequel, Part 3: The Last of Summer; 35. Sasayan-kun and Natsume-san; 36. Career Plan
Shizuku and the gang continue their summer camping trip where Shizuku and Haru go into town to do a stamp rally event. Shizuku ponders how they are perceived as a couple, while Haru and Yamaken try to avoid Yuzan and Ando who are in the area. Later, the gang and Shizuku's little brother go to a summer festival. After Asako musters the courage to give a souvenir to Mitchan, she is surprised when Sasayan holds her hand when he comforts her, and things get awkward between the two. But when they reconcile and become friends again, Sasayan casually mentions that he likes her. Shizuku learns that Haru wants to choose a non-academic career and that he has some family history that he doesn't want Shizuku to dig into.
10	August 10, 2012	978-4-06-365701-2	September 8, 2015	978-1-63236-106-6
37. The Yuzan-san Story; 38. On the Day of the School Festival; 39. Shizuku; 40. The World I Saw One Day; Bonus chapter: Kenji and Haru
Haru and Yuzan's father wants Yuzan to organize his own birthday party. Yuzan meets Shizuku and they talk about Haru's future while he thinks about his and Haru's past. At the school festival, Yuzan invites Haru to his party. Haru agrees on the condition that they don't bug him anymore. At the party, Shizuku feels uncomfortable that she doesn't belong in Haru and Yuzan's social circles and questions why she is even in the relationship when she and Haru are not alike and that Haru does not understand how she feels. But when she confronts Haru about it, Haru replies "You, Yuzan, this party, everyone can go to hell." Haru thinks about his childhood with Yuzan, ponders his falling out with Shizuku, who ponders making up with him but Haru does not appear at school the next day. The bonus chapter covers Haru and Yamaken's childhood when they were classmates in elementary school around second grade.
11	January 11, 2013	978-4-06-365717-3	November 10, 2015	978-1-63236-108-0
41. Two Weeks Later; 42. Merry-Go-Round; 43. Two in a Dream; 44. Yamaken and Shizuku
Haru has disappeared for two weeks since Yuzan's party and nobody knows where he has gone. Natsume worries that Shizuku and Haru have broken up. Shizuku tells Yamaken she regrets taking her frustrations on Haru, and they unexpectedly run into Haru. Despite Yamaken's attempt to rile up Haru by flirting with Shizuku, Haru abruptly leaves; both Shizuku and Haru are left shocked from their encounter. Sasayan finds Haru, who reveals that after Yuzan's party, he had been abducted by Kiriya, a colleague of his late aunt, to assist with Kiriya's research team. Natsume notices Shizuku is avoiding Haru; when Shizuku admits she's afraid Haru doesn't need her, Natsume assures her that Haru will listen. When they finally meet again, they apologize to each other and Haru tells Shizuku he wants to know how she feels, only to be interrupted by the school bell. Yamaken takes Shizuku away after school and asks her to be his girlfriend. After reflecting on her feelings, Shizuku turns Yamaken down and they agree to be friends. Shizuku finds a voice mail sent by Haru after Yuzan's party informing her where he would be for two weeks, and realizes he remembered to call her as she asked. She goes to Haru and tells him how she really feels about him and how he makes her angry, and is surprised that he is happy with her honesty.
12	August 10, 2013 (limited edition); August 12, 2013 (regular edition)	978-4-06-358451-6 (limited edition); ISBN 978-4-06-365739-5 (regular edition)	January 26, 2016	978-1-63236-127-1
45. A Warm Sunrise; 46. Home Sweet Home; 47. Third-Year Students; 48. Graduation; Bonus: Sequel: After He Asked
Shizuku and Haru reconcile. Shizuku, Haru, and the gang attend the Japanese New Year festival. Shizuku visits Haru at his room. She learns of the story of Haru and Yuzan's moon rocks, and discovers he is going to move out and work on the science internship. Shizuku and the others go through their third year without Haru. They graduate and share their plans for colleges and schools. The school teachers give Shizuku Haru's stuff that they have collected over the years. She visits Mitchan's, and soon discovers Haru has returned. Haru says he may join that fishing expedition for a year and continue at the science internship. Three-and-a-half years later, Shizuku has passed her bar exam and is starting a legal apprenticeship, when Haru casually proposes marriage to her. A bonus chapter shows them with Shizuku's engagement ring.
13	January 10, 2014	978-4-06-365755-5	March 29, 2016	978-1-63236-208-7
Extra Chapter 1: The Sasayan Story 2; Extra Chapter 2: Iyo's Operation: Prince Charming!; Extra Chapter 3: Children by the Riverside; Extra Chapter 4: Never Ending; Bonus content: My Little Monster Fan Book extras
The volume contains a bunch of side stories, four-panel comics, and other extras. It also has profiles of the characters in the series. Sasayan thinks over his high school relationships especially with Asako. Iyo and Yuzan go on a date until Yamaken interrupts. Yuzan reflects on his past and decides on his future after running into Takaya. As Takaya prepares for his sister's wedding, he thinks about his own relationship situation where he has fallen for Chizuru Oshima, who has been working as a student teacher. At first he tries to confess to her but discovers she had a boyfriend, and backs down. But later, he tells her boldly, which embarrasses her, and thinking of Haru and Shizuku's relationship, hopes to keep trying.

=== Anime ===
An anime adaptation was announced in the July 2012 issue of Kodansha's Dessert magazine. The series was produced by Brain's Base under the direction of Hiro Kaburaki with Noboru Takagi as script supervisor. It aired between October 1 and December 24, 2012. An OVA episode was released on DVD with the final manga volume on August 12, 2013. NIS America licensed the anime for release in North America. Sentai Filmworks licensed the series for streaming in April 2021. Remow licensed the series in English and started streaming it on its It's Anime YouTube channel. The opening theme is "Q&A Recital!" (Q&Aリサイタル！) by Haruka Tomatsu and the ending theme is "White Wishes" by 9nine.

=== Live-action film ===
A live-action film adaptation was announced on May 15, 2017, and was released in April 2018. It stars Masaki Suda as Haru and Tao Tsuchiya as Shizuku.

== Works cited ==
- "Ch." is shortened form for chapter and refers to a chapter number of the My Little Monster manga
- "Ep." is shortened form for episode and refers to an episode number of the My Little Monster anime

== Reception ==
The manga has over 6.1 million copies in print.
