= Robico =

Japanese manga artist

- ろびこ
- Pronunciation: Robiko
- Born: October 8 Kagoshima, Japan
- Occupation: Manga artist
- Years active: 2005-present
- Notable work: My Little Monster; Our Precious Conversations
- Awards: Kodansha Manga Award (2020)

Robico (Japanese: ろびこ, Hepburn: Robiko; born October 8) is a Japanese manga artist from Kagoshima Prefecture, best known for My Little Monster. Robico is a pen name and the author's real name is unknown.

== Biography ==
Robico attended vocational school with the thought of becoming an illustrator. In 2005, Robico made her debut with Demekinikku (デメキンイック) published in the May edition of Dessert. In 2014, she collaborated with author Tsugumi Ohba for the one-shot "Skip! Yamada-kun". An exhibition of Robico's art was held in Aoyama in 2019 and included original art from her works Himikoi, My Little Monster, and Our Precious Conversations. Robico created the original character designs for the anime Backflip!! (バクテン!!).

== Works ==
- Demekinikku (デメキンイック) (2005) – (one-shot in Kodansha's Dessert)
- Kanojo ga Inakunatta (彼女がいなくなった) (2006) – (serialized in Dessert)
- Boy x Meet x Girl (ボーイ×ミーツ×ガール) (2007)
- Himikoi (ひみこい) (2007-2008) – (serialized in Dessert)
- My Little Monster (となりの怪物くん) (2008-2013) – (serialized in Dessert)
- Skip! Yamada-kun (スキップ！山田くん) (2014) – (artist of one-shot written by Tsugumi Ohba for Shuiesha's Weekly Young Jump)
- Miracle☆Gift (ミラクル☆ギフト) (2015) – (one-shot in Kodansha's Weekly Shounen Magazine)
- Our Precious Conversations (僕と君の大切な話) (2015-2019) – (serialized in Dessert)
- Wash Me Hug Me! (2020) – (one-shot in Dessert)
- To Dusk and Twilight (夕闇とかたわれ) (2026-present) – (serialized in YanMaga Web)

== Filmography ==
In 2012, Robico's manga My Little Monster inspired a 13 episode anime series that aired in Japan and was simulcast by Crunchyroll. NIS America later released the series in the summer. A live action film of My Little Monster based on the manga of the same name was released in 2018.

== Awards ==
In 2020, she won the 44th Annual Kodansha Manga Awards' Best Shōjo Manga Award for Our Precious Conversations.
