= Yuta Koseki =

Japanese actor and model (born 1995)

- 小関 裕太
- Born: June 8, 1995 (age 31); Tokyo, Japan
- Occupations: Actor; model
- Years active: 2006–present
- Height: 180 cm (5 ft 11 in)

Yuta Koseki (小関 裕太, Koseki Yūta; born June 8, 1995) is a Japanese actor and model.

== Filmography ==
=== Film ===
Year	Title	Role	Notes	Ref(s)
2006	Vanished	Young Kazumasa Yamada		
2007	Ten Nights of Dreams	Young Natsume Sōseki		
2010	The Lady Shogun and Her Men	Gofukunoma		
2014	A Drop of the Grapevine	Young Ao		
2015	Ashita ni Nareba	Daisuke Matsui	Lead role	
2015	Drawing Days	Natsuo	Lead role	
2016	Dorome: Boys' Side	Hoshino	Lead role	
2016	Dorome: Girls' Side	Hoshino		
2017	Laughing Under the Clouds	Ren Nagayama		
2017	Anonymous Noise	Momo		
2018	Missions of Love	Shigure Kitami	Lead role	
2018	Waiting for Spring	Aya Kamiyama		
2018	Hold On, Baseball Team!	Akimoto		
2019	I Was a Secret Bitch	Andō		
2019	Signal 100	Sota Sakaki		
2020	Mio's Cookbook	Nagata Gensai		
2021	Liar × Liar	Shinji Karasuma		
2024	Lovesick Ellie	Sumi Shiota		

=== Television ===
Year	Title	Role	Note	Ref(s)
2006	Tensai TV-kun Max	Himself	Regular from 2006-2008	
2015	Hotel Concierge	Gota Makihara		
2017	Tokyo Alice	Ken Shinonome		
2018	Missions of Love	Shigure Kitami	Lead role; tie-in to film	
2018	Zero: Ikkakusenkin Game	Yuki Hikawa	Lead role	
2018	Half Blue Sky	Kento	Asadora; episodes 110-137, 156	
2019	Atarashii Ou-sama	Wakai		
2019	Shibo Flag ga Tachimashita!	Toru Jinnai	Lead role	
2025	A Calm Sea and Beautiful Days with You	Ryunosuke Fukami		
2026	Brothers in Arms	Oda Nobutada	Taiga drama	

=== Japanese dub ===
Year	Title	Role	Notes	Ref(s)
2023	Puss in Boots: The Last Wish	Perrito		
2024	Moana 2	Moni		

== Stage ==
=== Theatre ===
Year	Title	Role	Notes	Ref(s)
2009	Shugo Chara! The Musical	Kukai Soma		
2010	La Corda d'Oro Stella: The Musical	Keiichi Shimizu		
2011	Musical: The Prince of Tennis 2nd Season	Eiji Kikumaru		
