= Takeba =

- Language: Japanese

Origin
- Meaning: Various: 竹葉: bamboo leaf; 竹場: bamboo field; 武場: military (training) field

Takeba is a Japanese surname.

== People ==
Notable people with this surname include:

- Lisa Takeba (born 1983), Japanese filmmaker
- Taeko Takeba (born 1966), Japanese trap shooter

== Fictional characters ==
- Yukari Takeba, a main character in the video game Persona 3
