= How I Met My Soulmate =

Japanese manga series

- First tankōbon volume cover

運命の人に出会う話 (Unmei no Hito ni Deau Hanashi)
- Genre: Romance
- Manga
- Written by: Anashin
- Published by: Kodansha
- English publisher: NA: Kodansha USA
- Magazine: Dessert (April 24, 2021 – September 24, 2025); Palcy (October 10, 2025 – present)
- Original run: April 24, 2021 – present
- Volumes: 8
- icon

How I Met My Soulmate (Japanese: 運命の人に出会う話, Hepburn: Unmei no Hito ni Deau Hanashi) is a Japanese manga series written and illustrated by Anashin. It was serialized in Kodansha's Dessert from April 2021 to September 2025, and later transferred to the Palcy app in October 2025. Its chapters have been collected in eight tankōbon volumes as of March 2026.

== Publication ==
Written and illustrated by Anashin, How I Met My Soulmate was first serialized in Kodansha's Dessert from April 24, 2021, to September 24, 2025. It was later transferred to the Palcy app on October 10, 2025. Kodansha has collected its chapters into individual tankōbon volumes. The first volume was released on January 13, 2022. As of March 13, 2026, eight volumes have been released.

In North America, the manga is licensed for English release by Kodansha USA.

=== Volumes ===
| No. | Original release date | Original ISBN | English release date | English ISBN |
|---|---|---|---|---|
| 1 | January 13, 2022 | 978-4-06-526581-9 | December 12, 2023 | 978-1-64651-875-3 |
1. "Is This Fate...?"; 2. "First Crush"; 3. "Reunion"; 4. The Truth"
| 2 | August 12, 2022 | 978-4-06-528861-0 | March 13, 2024 | 978-1-64651-945-3 |
5. "The Decision"; 6. "Summer's Eve"; 7. "Overnight"; 8. "An Emotional Mess"
| 3 | February 13, 2023 | 978-4-06-530724-3 | June 11, 2024 | 978-1-64651-999-6 |
9. "Daybreak"; 10. "Unknown Territory"; 11. "A Huge Deal"; 12. "Unwavering"
| 4 | August 10, 2023 | 978-4-06-532757-9 | September 24, 2024 | 979-8-88877-050-4 |
13. "Birthday (Part 1)"; 14. "Birthday (Part 2)"; 15. "Guys' Night"; 16. "Welcome Home"
| 5 | February 13, 2024 | 978-4-06-534636-5 | December 16, 2025 | 979-8-88877-333-8 |
17. "Memories"; 18. "The Secret"; 19. "Best I Can Manage"; 20. "Bliss"
| 6 | November 13, 2024 | 978-4-06-537561-7; 978-4-06-537568-6 (SE) | February 10, 2026 | 979-8-88877-558-5 |
21. "Waiting Forever"; 22. "Too Dear to Part"; 23. "With All My Heart and Soul"; 24. "Mutual Attraction"
| 7 | June 13, 2025 | 978-4-06-539785-5 | May 19, 2026 | 979-8-88877-725-1 |
| 8 | March 13, 2026 | 978-4-06-542833-7 | — | — |

== Reception ==
The series, alongside Itsuka Shinu nara E o Utte kara, won the Women's Comic Prize at the 2025 Digital Comic Awards. The series was nominated for the 49th Kodansha Manga Award in the shōjo category in 2025.

== See also ==
- Waiting for Spring, another manga series by the same author
