= Hikaru Takahashi =

Japanese actress and model (born 2001)

- 髙橋 ひかる
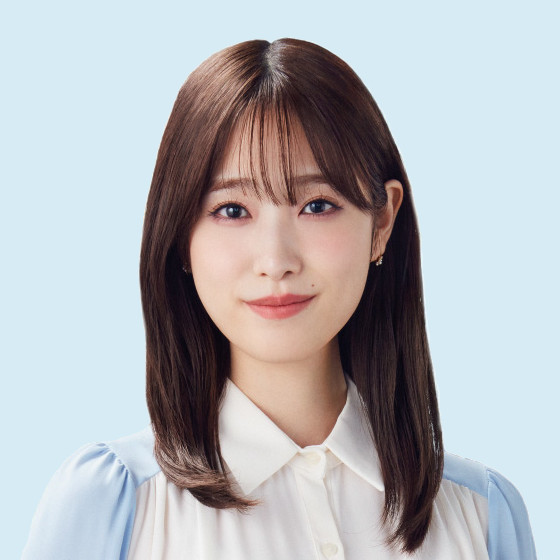
- Takahashi in 2024
- Born: September 22, 2001 (age 25); Ōtsu, Shiga, Japan
- Occupations: Model; actress
- Years active: 2014–present
- Height: 1.67 m (5 ft 5 1/2 in)

Hikaru Takahashi (髙橋 ひかる, Takahashi Hikaru; born September 22, 2001) is a Japanese actress and model, currently affiliated to Oscar Promotion.

== Career ==
Takahashi rose to fame after participating in the 14th Japan Bishōjo Contest in 2014, in which she won the Grand Prix among 80,131 applicants, 1,428 who passed the primary document examination and 21 finalists. During the main competition held on August 5 at Grand Prince Hotel New Takanawa, she sang Erika Sawajiri's "Taiyou no Uta". On December 17, she participated in Oscar Promotion's annual kimono photo session, held at the Meiji Memorial Hall.

In February 2015, Takahashi starred in a commercial by the Japanese Consumers' Co-operative Union and Yoyogi Seminar. At the same time, she starred in drama film Jinsei no Yakusoku. On September 13, she was appointed Public Relations Manager of Shiga Prefecture. On October 13, she was appointed the ambassador for Hie Shrine.

On January 23, 2016, Takahashi attended the Shiga-Lake Biwa Rainbow's Luck Festival as ambassador of Shiga. During the 41st Hochi Film Award, she was nominated Best New Artist for starring in Jinsei no Yakusoku. On December 8, she participated in Oscar Promotion's annual kimono photo session.

In February 2017, Takahashi moved to Tokyo with her mother. On March 4, she attended the "One Day EVENT Shiga Ward" at the AQUA CiTY ODAIBA. On April 19, she was chosen winner of the second Black Hair Beauty Award organized by Yanagiya Honten.

== Filmography ==
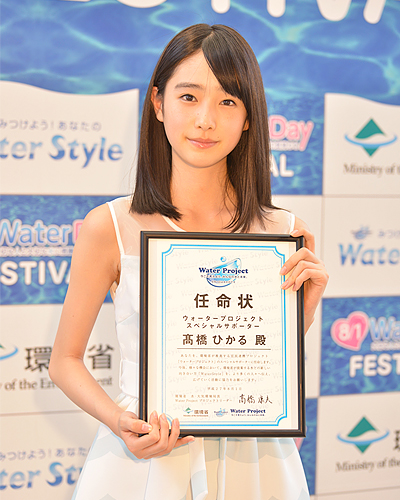
Takahashi at an event of the "Water Project" of the Ministry of the Environment, Japan in 2015

=== Films ===
Year	Title	Role	Notes	Ref.
2016	A Living Promise	Hitomi Watanabe		
2022	Mr. Osomatsu	Totoko		
2024	Honeko Akabane's Bodyguards	Nei Togeya		
2025	Romantic Killer	Riri Fushigi		
2026	Yamaguchi-kun Isn't So Bad	Satsuki Shinohara		
2026	Why Wait, Just Die	Kaori Shinomiya		

=== Television dramas ===
Year	Title	Role	Notes	Ref.
2017	Naotora: The Lady Warlord	Young Takase	Taiga drama	
2018	Parfait Tic!	Fuko Kameyama	Lead role	
2018	Born to be a Flower	Akiho Harada		
2019	Where Have My Skirts Gone?	Yui Kawasaki		
2022	I Want to Hold Aono-kun so Badly I Could Die	Yuri Kariya		
2022	Blue Box Briefing		Episode 4	
2024	Living-Room Matsunaga-san	Miko Sonoda		

=== Music videos ===
Year	Artist	Title	Notes	Ref.
2015	Little Glee Monster	Jinsei wa Ichido Kiri		

=== Video games ===
Year	Title	Role	Notes	Ref.
2023	Street Fighter 6	Herself	Hikaru appears as a selectable color voice commentator for the game	

=== Dubbing ===
- Wonka (Miss Bon Bon)
