= Jinsei no Yakusoku =

- Poster

Japanese name
- Kanji: 人生の約束
- Directed by: Kan Ishibashi
- Screenplay by: Masahiro Yoshimoto
- Produced by: Eiji Satouchi; Takahiro Sato; Yūji Ishida; Yumi Arakawa
- Starring: Yutaka Takenouchi; Yōsuke Eguchi; Tori Matsuzaka; Yūka; Eiko Koike
- Cinematography: Jun Mizunashi; Satoru Yamashita
- Edited by: Takashi Tominaga
- Music by: Kiyoshi Yoshikawa
- Production company: 5-nen D-gumi
- Distributed by: Toho
- Release date: January 9, 2016 (Japan)
- Running time: 120 minutes
- Country: Japan
- Language: Japanese
- Box office: US$3.4 million (Japan)

Jinsei no Yakusoku (Japanese: 人生の約束), also known as A Living Promise, is a 2016 Japanese drama film directed by Kan Ishibashi and written by Masahiro Yoshimoto. It was released in Japan on January 9, 2016.

== Cast ==
- Yutaka Takenouchi
- Yōsuke Eguchi
- Tori Matsuzaka
- Yūka
- Eiko Koike
- Hikaru Takahashi
- Jun Miho
- Mikako Ichikawa
- Akira Emoto
- Beat Takeshi
- Toshiyuki Nishida

== Reception ==
The film grossed ¥100,525,200 on its opening weekend in Japan and was sixth placed in admissions, with 81,867. On its second weekend, it was in tenth place by admissions and ninth place by gross, with US$471,477. As of January 24, 2016, the film had grossed US$3.4 million in Japan.
