= Return from Death =

Japanese light novel series

- First light novel volume cover

死に戻りの魔法学校生活を、元恋人とプロローグから(※ただし好感度はゼロ) (Shinimodori no Mahō Gakkō Seikatsu o, Moto Koibito to Purorōgu kara (Tadashi Kōkando wa Zero))
- Genre: Fantasy; Mystery; Romantic drama
- Novel series
- Written by: Eiko Mutsuhana
- Published by: Shōsetsuka ni Narō
- Original run: October 6, 2020 – January 5, 2021
- Light novel
- Written by: Eiko Mutsuhana
- Illustrated by: Yugiri Aika
- Published by: Earth Star Entertainment
- English publisher: NA: Cross Infinite World
- Imprint: Earth Star Luna
- Original run: June 16, 2021 – April 15, 2022
- Volumes: 3
- Manga

Re-Living My Life with a Boyfriend Who Doesn't Remember Me
- Written by: Eiko Mutsuhana
- Illustrated by: Gin Shirakawa
- Published by: Kadokawa Shoten
- English publisher: NA: Seven Seas Entertainment
- Imprint: Flos Comic
- Magazine: ComicWalker; Niconico Seiga
- Original run: January 30, 2022 – present
- Volumes: 7
- icon

Return from Death (Japanese: 死に戻りの魔法学校生活を、元恋人とプロローグから(※ただし好感度はゼロ), Hepburn: Shinimodori no Mahō Gakkō Seikatsu o, Moto Koibito to Purorōgu kara (Tadashi Kōkando wa Zero)) is a Japanese light novel series written by Eiko Mutsuhana and illustrated by Yugiri Aika. It was initially serialized on the user-generated novel publishing website Shōsetsuka ni Narō between October 2020 and January 2021. It was later acquired by Earth Star Entertainment who released it under their Earth Star Luna light novel imprint between June 2021 and April 2022. A manga adaptation, titled Re-Living My Life with a Boyfriend Who Doesn't Remember Me, illustrated by Gin Shirakawa began serialization on Kadokawa Corporation's ComicWalker and Niconico Seiga websites in January 2022.

In 2026, Re-Living My Life with a Boyfriend Who Doesn't Remember Me won the 50th Kodansha Manga Award in the shōjo category.

== Plot ==
The story follows Oriana, a young girl living happily at a magic school, and her lover, Vincent. However, in the spring of her 17th year, they both mysteriously die simultaneously. Oriana, however, suddenly "awakens" after death; she has been reborn with memories of the future, and in this life, she vows to protect Vincent. Ten years later, Oriana returns to magic school and encounters her former lover, Vincent, again. But Vincent doesn't remember her at all. With zero affection from him, Oriana's overly affectionate behavior only earns her being seen as strange. Undeterred, Oriana continues to try to build a new relationship with him.

== Media ==
=== Light novel ===
Written by Eiko Mutsuhana, Return from Death was serialized on the user-generated novel publishing website Shōsetsuka ni Narō from October 6, 2020, to January 5, 2021. It was later acquired by Earth Star Entertainment who published three light novel volumes with illustrations by Yugiri Aika under its Earth Star Luna imprint from June 16, 2021, to April 15, 2022.

In August 2021, Cross Infinite World announced that they licensed the series for digital English publication. Their releases contain new illustrations by Hiyori Asahikawa and Yuki Nekozuki.

Original release

| No. | Release date | ISBN |
|---|---|---|
| 1 | June 16, 2021 | 978-4-8030-1796-0 |
| 2 | April 15, 2022 | 978-4-8030-1797-7 |
| 3 | April 15, 2022 | 978-4-8030-1798-4 |

English release

| No. | Title | Release date | ISBN |
|---|---|---|---|
| 1 | Return from Death: I Kicked the Bucket and Now I'm Back at Square One With a Boyfriend Who Doesn't Remember Me | September 30, 2021 | 978-1-945341-67-0 |
| 2 | Return from Death: I Kicked the Bucket and Now I'm Back at Square One With a Girlfriend Who Doesn't Remember Me | March 31, 2023 | 979-8-88560-052-1 |

=== Manga ===
A manga adaptation illustrated by Gin Shirakawa began serialization on Kadokawa Corporation's ComicWalker and Niconico Seiga websites under the FLOS Comic brand on January 30, 2022. The manga's chapters have been compiled into seven tankōbon volumes as of February 2026.

In September 2023, Seven Seas Entertainment announced that they licensed the manga adaptation for English publication. They publish the manga under the title Re-Living My Life with a Boyfriend Who Doesn't Remember Me.

| No. | Original release date | Original ISBN | North American release date | North American ISBN |
|---|---|---|---|---|
| 1 | April 5, 2022 | 978-4-04-681345-9 | July 9, 2024 | 979-8-88843-761-2 |
1. "My Second Entrance Ceremony"; 2. "The Branch of the Dragon Tree"; 3. "A Fourth Year Student Once Again"; 4. "On the Straight Path"
| 2 | December 5, 2022 | 978-4-04-681908-6 | November 19, 2024 | 979-8-89160-054-6 |
5. "Shadow of a Scientist"; 6. "The Helvran Rose"; 7. "Caged Glimmers"; 8. "Bleak Love"; 9. "I'll Sweep up Your Long Hair"
| 3 | July 5, 2023 | 978-4-04-682535-3 | March 4, 2025 | 979-8-89160-565-7 |
10. "Zoisite's Destination"; 11. "The Kind Me That She Loves"; 12. "Oriana"; 13. "The Best Birthday Part 1"; Bonus: "Ferveira's Eldest Son"
| 4 | February 5, 2024 | 978-4-04-683322-8 | July 1, 2025 | 979-8-89160-998-3 |
14. "The Best Birthday Part 2"; 15. "The Dragon's Baptism"; 16. "Matching Earrings"; 17. "A Dress, Love, and a Bouquet"
| 5 | September 17, 2024 | 978-4-04-683934-3 | November 11, 2025 | 979-8-89373-957-2 |
18. "A Special Apology"; 19. "The Star's Guardian Part 1"; 20. "The Star's Guardian Part 2"; 21. "The Star's Guardian Part 3"
| 6 | May 16, 2025 | 978-4-04-684771-3 | May 5, 2026 | 979-8-89765-140-5 |
22. "Night Leaves Whirl at the Ball 1"; 23. "Night Leaves Whirl at the Ball 2"; 24. "Oriana and the Magic Wand"; 25. "A Kiss Under the Weeping Willow"
| 7 | February 5, 2026 | 978-4-04-685579-4 | November 17, 2026 | 979-8-89863-225-0 |
| 8 | December 4, 2026 | 978-4-04-660623-5 | — | — |

== Reception ==
By January 2025, the series had over 1 million copies in circulation. The manga adaptation was ranked third at the 2024 EbookJapan Manga Awards. The manga adaptation was also nominated for the tenth Next Manga Awards in the web category in 2024. The manga adaptation, alongside Itsuka Shinu nara E o Utte kara and Roaming, was ranked fourteenth in the 2025 edition of Takarajimasha's Kono Manga ga Sugoi! guidebook's list of the best manga for female readers. The manga adaptation was ranked sixth in the 18th Manga Taishō. The manga adaptation was nominated for the 49th Kodansha Manga Award in 2025 in the shōjo category; It won the 50th edition in the same category in 2026.

== See also ==
- Hello, I am a Witch, and My Crush Wants Me to Make a Love Potion!, another light novel series with the same writer
