= Ohitori-sama Hotel =

Japanese manga series

- First tankōbon volume cover

おひとりさまホテル (Ohitori-sama Hoteru)
- Genre: Drama, Iyashikei
- Created by: Maro
- Manga
- Written by: Hirochi Maki
- Published by: Shinchosha
- Imprint: Bunch Comics
- Magazine: Monthly Comic Bunch; (May 20, 2022 – March 21, 2024); Comic Bunch Kai; (April 26, 2024 – present)
- Original run: May 20, 2022 – present
- Volumes: 10

Ohitori-sama Hotel (おひとりさまホテル, Ohitori-sama Hoteru) is a Japanese manga series written and illustrated by Hirochi Maki based on an original concept by Maro. It began serialization in Shinchosha's seinen manga magazine Monthly Comic Bunch in May 2022.

== Synopsis ==
Fumika Shiokawa is a 31 year-old woman who works for a hotel development company. She has had a fondness for hotels since her childhood, and spends her moments away from work at hotels.

== Publication ==
Written and illustrated by Hirochi Maki and based on an original concept by Maro, Ohitori-sama Hotel began serialization in Shinchosha's seinen manga magazine Monthly Comic Bunch on May 20, 2022. After the magazine published its final issue on March 21, 2024, the series was transferred to the newly established Comic Bunch Kai website on April 26, 2024. Its chapters have been collected in ten tankōbon volumes as of November 2026.

No.	Release date	ISBN
1	January 7, 2023	978-4-10-772557-8
2	August 8, 2023	978-4-10-772636-0
3	January 9, 2024	978-4-10-772677-3
4	June 7, 2024	978-4-10-772725-1
5	December 9, 2024	978-4-10-772779-4
6	April 9, 2025	978-4-10-772819-7
7	September 9, 2025	978-4-10-772871-5
8	February 9, 2026	978-4-10-772911-8
9	June 9, 2026	978-4-10-772953-8
10	November 9, 2026	978-4-10-773004-6

== Reception ==
The series, alongside Itsuka Shinu nara E o Utte kara and Fall in Love, You False Angels, was ranked 18th in the 2024 edition of Takarajimasha's Kono Manga ga Sugoi! guidebook for the best manga for female readers. The series was a prize winner in the "Next Impact Comic" category at the 2nd Rakuten Kobo E-book Manga Awards in 2024. The series was ranked fourth in Da Vinci's 2025 Book of the Year ranking.
