= A Condition Called Love =

Japanese manga series and its adaptation(s)

- First tankōbon volume cover, featuring Hotaru Hinase and Saki Hananoi

花野井くんと恋の病 (Hananoi-kun to Koi no Yamai)
- Genre: Romance
- Manga
- Written by: Megumi Morino
- Published by: Kodansha
- English publisher: NA: Kodansha USA
- Magazine: Dessert
- Original run: December 22, 2017 – April 23, 2026
- Volumes: 19
- Anime television series
- Directed by: Tomoe Makino
- Written by: Hitomi Amamiya
- Music by: Yamazo
- Studio: East Fish Studio
- Licensed by: Crunchyroll; SEA: Medialink
- Original network: JNN (TBS)
- Original run: April 4, 2024 – June 20, 2024
- Episodes: 12
- icon

A Condition Called Love (Japanese: 花野井くんと恋の病, Hepburn: Hananoi-kun to Koi no Yamai; lit. "Love's Sickness with Hananoi") is a Japanese manga series written and illustrated by Megumi Morino. It was serialized in Kodansha's magazine Dessert from December 2017 to April 2026. As of July 2026, 19 tankōbon volumes have been released. An anime television series adaptation produced by East Fish Studio aired from April to June 2024.

== Plot ==
The story follows Hotaru Hinase, a high school freshman with a good life full of good friends and family, but lacking romance. Things change after she gives a helping hand to Saki Hananoi, a handsome guy who just got dumped by his girlfriend leading to Saki asking her for a trial relationship. Initially, a confused Hotaru rejects him, but later on decides to give him a chance, leading to her warming up to the idea of finding love and being in a relationship.

== Characters ==
Hotaru Hinase (日生 ほたる, Hinase Hotaru)
Voiced by: Kana Ichinose (voice comic), Kana Hanazawa (anime) (Japanese); Dani Chambers (English)
Hotaru is a shy and timid but friendly girl who is Hananoi's girlfriend. She comes from a loving family and also has good friends, but has never been in love and believed she will never experience it. Her idea of love stemmed from a personal trauma which involved an old elementary school classmate cutting her hair out of jealousy, and it stuck with her ever since. She initially rejected Hananoi's request of being his girlfriend, the thought of having a relationship still bothering her. However, she begins to warm up to the idea of love after she gets along with him and later starts actually dating him. She was in the same class as him in elementary school, but never noticed him at the time. At the end of the story, she becomes Hananoi's wife after he proposes to her in the future.
Saki Hananoi (花野井 颯生, Hananoi Saki)
Voiced by: Koki Uchiyama (voice comic), Chiaki Kobayashi (anime) (Japanese); Blake McNamara (English)
Hananoi is a popular and handsome student who is Hotaru's boyfriend. Often seen as nonchalant, sweet and loving, those who get to know him realize that he holds a secret side that he never shows. He is shown to be anti-social, stalker-ish, possessive, overly dedicated, and he would tend to dismiss anyone who tries to get along with him besides Hotaru. At the beginning, he asks Hotaru out for a trial relationship right after she had helped him after he got dumped by his ex-girlfriend and shortly began dating soon after. He has an attachment issue which occasionally makes Hotaru feel uneasy around him, and the root cause for it stems from his parents who never had the time to care for him since they were doctors helping underprivileged children outside of the country, and it hinders him from having a healthy relationship with any girl he dates, as he wishes someone would love him the way he loves. With the help of Hotaru, he begins to warm up to the people around him and forms a friendship with Keigo soon after. He lives alone, with his grandma often coming to visit him at times. In elementary school, his only friend was an old man who would often give him advice, and Hotaru, who was the only person who noticed him and was also his first love. At the end of the story, Hananoi proposes to Hotaru and they get married.
Hibiki Asami (浅海 響, Asami Hibiki) / Kyō-chan (きょーちゃん)
Voiced by: Yurika Kubo (Japanese); Kelly Greenshield (English)
Hibiki is one of Hotaru's close friends and is also Keigo's girlfriend. She loves to help Hotaru figure out how love works and is supportive of her relationship with Hananoi. She has a fear of dogs.
Tsukiha Shibamura (柴村 月葉, Shibamura Tsukiha) / Shibamū (しばむー)
Voiced by: Maaya Sakamoto (Japanese); Ezra Vervin (English)
Tsukiha is also one of Hotaru's close friends and is a member of the kendo club. She has a calm presence, and acts like a big sister to her friends.
Sōhei Yao (八尾 創平, Yao Sōhei)
Voiced by: Ryōhei Kimura
Yao is an old classmate of Hotaru and Hananoi and is also their co-worker at a part-time job they all work at. He is the root cause of Hotaru's trauma, as their classmate was jealous of them and it led to that specific classmate cutting Hotaru's hair out of jealousy. He tries to rekindle their friendship, but she often acts distant around him. Hananoi is severely wary of him, as he assumes that Yao wants to take her away from him. She calls Hotaru by the nickname 'Hotako', as he owns a dog that shares the same name as her.
Keigo Kurata (倉田 圭悟, Kurata Keigo)
Voiced by: Ryōta Ōsaka
Keigo is a member of Hotaru's group of friends and is also Hibiki's boyfriend. He is a member of the Basketball Club. He tries to get along with Hananoi but is often dismissive of him.
Satomi Satomura (里村 紗都美, Satomura Satomi)
Voiced by: Sayumi Suzushiro
Satomi is a woman who works at the same bookstore Hotaru, Hananoi and Yao are in. She is in love with an idol who looks eerily similar to Hananoi.
Yukihiro Kuroe (黒江 之紘, Kuroe Yukihiro)
Voiced by: Kazuyuki Okitsu

== Media ==
=== Manga ===
The series is written and illustrated by Megumi Morino. It premiered in the February 2018 issue of Dessert, which shipped on December 22, 2017, and finished in the September 2025 issue, which shipped on July 24, 2025. The first volume was released on May 11, 2018. The series reached its final arc on November 24, 2023. As of July 2026, 19 tankōbon volumes have been released.

On March 8, 2020, Kodansha USA announced they would publish the series digitally. During their panel at Anime Expo 2022, Kodansha USA announced that they would begin publishing the manga in print in Q2 2023.

==== Volumes ====
No.	Original release date	Original ISBN	English release date	English ISBN
1	May 11, 2018	978-4-06-511469-8	March 3, 2020 (digital); January 24, 2023 (print)	978-1-64659-341-5 (digital); 978-1-64651-756-5 (print)
2	October 12, 2018	978-4-06-513177-0	April 7, 2020 (digital); March 14, 2023 (print)	978-1-64659-284-5 (digital); 978-1-64651-757-2 (print)
3	March 13, 2019	978-4-06-514830-3	May 5, 2020 (digital); May 23, 2023 (print)	978-1-64659-355-2 (digital); 978-1-64651-758-9 (print)
4	August 9, 2019	978-4-06-516716-8	June 2, 2020 (digital); July 18, 2023 (print)	978-1-64659-380-4 (digital); 978-1-64651-759-6 (print)
5	January 10, 2020	978-4-06-518226-0; 978-4-06-518460-8 (SE)	July 7, 2020 (digital); November 21, 2023 (print)	978-1-64659-588-4 (digital); 978-1-64651-760-2 (print)
6	June 11, 2020	978-4-06-519762-2	October 6, 2020 (digital); January 23, 2024 (print)	978-1-64659-747-5 (digital); 978-1-64651-761-9 (print)
7	November 13, 2020	978-4-06-521527-2; 978-4-06-521528-9 (SE)	March 30, 2021 (digital); March 26, 2024 (print)	978-1-63699-022-4 (digital); 978-1-64651-762-6 (print)
8	April 13, 2021	978-4-06-522817-3	September 7, 2021 (digital); June 4, 2024 (print)	978-1-63699-346-1 (digital); 978-1-64651-810-4 (print)
9	September 13, 2021	978-4-06-524677-1	February 1, 2022 (digital); July 30, 2024 (print)	978-1-63699-602-8 (digital); 978-1-64651-811-1 (print)
10	March 11, 2022	978-4-06-527101-8; 978-4-06-527019-6 (SE)	August 16, 2022 (digital); October 1, 2024 (print)	978-1-68491-397-8 (digital); 978-1-64651-812-8 (print)
11	August 12, 2022	978-4-06-528819-1	December 13, 2022 (digital); January 28, 2025 (print)	978-1-68491-592-7 (digital); 978-1-64651-834-0 (print)
12	January 13, 2023	978-4-06-530401-3	May 2, 2023 (digital); March 25, 2025 (print)	978-1-68491-925-3 (digital); 979-8-88877-021-4 (print)
13	June 13, 2023	978-4-06-531936-9	November 21, 2023 (digital); May 27, 2025 (print)	979-8-88933-178-0 (digital); 979-8-88877-256-0 (print)
14	November 13, 2023	978-4-06-533724-0	April 30, 2024 (digital); July 29, 2025 (print)	979-8-88933-263-3 (digital); 979-8-88877-267-6 (print)
15	April 12, 2024	978-4-06-535287-8	September 3, 2024 (digital); September 30, 2025 (print)	979-8-89478-003-0 (digital); 979-8-88877-369-7 (print)
16	November 13, 2024	978-4-06-537656-0	April 8, 2025 (digital); December 23, 2025 (print)	979-8-89478-491-5 (digital); 979-8-88877-557-8 (print)
17	May 13, 2025	978-4-06-539497-7	September 9, 2025 (digital); March 31, 2026 (print)	979-8-89478-682-7 (digital); 979-8-88877-741-1 (print)
18	October 10, 2025	978-4-06-541209-1; 978-4-06-541211-4 (SE)	February 10, 2026 (digital); November 10, 2026 (print)	979-8-89478-889-0 (digital); 979-8-88877-916-3 (print)
19	July 13, 2026	978-4-06-543857-2; 978-4-06-543811-4 (SE)	—	—

=== Anime ===
An anime television series adaptation was announced on June 7, 2023. It is produced by East Fish Studio and directed by Tomoe Makino, with scripts written by Hitomi Amamiya, character designed by Akiko Satō, and music composed by Yamazo. The series aired from April 4 to June 20, 2024, on TBS and its affiliates. The opening theme song is "Kimi no Sei" (君のせい; lit."It's Your Fault"), performed by Sexy Zone, while the ending theme song is the Japanese version of "Every Second", performed by Mina Okabe. Crunchyroll streamed the series outside of Asia, but included the Middle East and CIS. Medialink licensed and streamed the series in select regions in East and Southeast Asia, on its Ani-One Asia YouTube channel. (Note: The anime airs 5 days late on regions licensed by Medialink.) (Note: The selected regions are the following: Hong Kong, Indonesia, Macao, Malaysia, Mongolia, Singapore, Taiwan, Thailand, and Vietnam.) Netflix will also stream the series in selected territories in Asia.

==== Episodes ====
No.	Title (Note: All English titles are taken from Crunchyroll.)	Directed by (Note: Information is taken from the ending credits of each episode.)	Storyboarded by	Original release date
1	"Nice to Meet You"; Transliteration: "Hajimemashite" (Japanese: はじめまして)	Tomoe Makino	Tomoe Makino	April 4, 2024
2	"My First Boyfriend"; Transliteration: "Hajimete no Kareshi" (Japanese: 初めての彼氏)	Shigenori Awai	Namako Umino	April 12, 2024 (Note: Due to the broadcast of the 2024 Masters Tournament, this episode aired at 1:28 a.m. JST, 1 hour and 32 minutes after the original air time on TBS.)
3	"Our First Christmas"; Transliteration: "Hajimete no Kurisumasu" (Japanese: 初めてのクリスマス)	Yuu Yabuuchi	Yuri Iwaso, Midori Yasumoto	April 18, 2024
4	"Our First Shrine Visit"; Transliteration: "Hajimete no Hatsumōde" (Japanese: 初めての初詣)	Michita Shiraishi	Nakano Umino	April 25, 2024
5	"Our First Date"; Transliteration: "Hajimete no Dēto" (Japanese: 初めてのデート)	Shigenori Awai	Akira Aisaki	May 2, 2024
6	"Our First Valentine's"; Transliteration: "Hajimete no Barentain" (Japanese: 初めてのバレンタイン)	Yuu Yabuuchi	Takashi Umasaki	May 9, 2024
7	"My First Confession"; Transliteration: "Hajimete no Kokuhaku" (Japanese: 初めての告白)	Yoko Morishita	Yuri Isowa	May 16, 2024
8	"My First Pet"; Transliteration: "Hajimete no Petto" (Japanese: 初めてのペット)	Haruo Ōkawara	Namako Umino	May 23, 2024
9	"His First Birthday"; Transliteration: "Hajimete no Tanjōbi" (Japanese: 初めての誕生日)	Michita Shiraishi	Yuri Isowa	May 30, 2024
10	"Our First Second Year"; Transliteration: "Hajimete no 2-nensei" (Japanese: 初めての2年生)	Hideaki Uehara	Yuri Isowa	June 6, 2024
11	"Our First Campus Expedition"; Transliteration: "Hajimete no Hakkō Tanken" (Japanese: 初めての学校探検)	Shigenori Awai, Tomoe Makino	Yuri Isowa, Tomoe Makino	June 14, 2024 (Note: This episode aired at 12:11 a.m. JST, 15 minutes after the original air time on TBS.)
12	"My First Love"; Transliteration: "Hajimete no Koi" (Japanese: 初めての恋)	Tomoe Makino	Tomoe Makino	June 20, 2024

== Reception ==
The series was a nominee for the 64th Shogakukan Manga Awards in the shōjo category. It was also the runner-up for the ninth An An manga award. In 2018, employees of one of the largest Japanese bookstores ranked the series as the tenth best manga of 2018. The series ranked fifteenth in the 2020 Kono Manga ga Sugoi! guidebook's top manga for female readers. Also in 2020, it was nominated for the Kodansha Manga Award in the shōjo category. In 2021, it won the Kodansha Manga Award in the shōjo category.

As of June 2023, the series has 3.8 million copies in circulation.

The anime series received generally mixed to negative reviews, and was listed by Anime News Network as one of "The Worst Anime of 2024". Furthermore, MrAJCosplay criticized the character Hananoi for being "harmful, creepy or invasive". He also points out the poor animation leading to many animation mistakes.

== See also ==
- Wake Up, Sleeping Beauty — Another manga series by the same author
