= My Boyfriend in Orange =

Manga

- English-language cover of volume 1

モエカレはオレンジ色 (Moekare wa Orenji-iro)
- Genre: Romance
- Manga
- Written by: Non Tamashima
- Published by: Kodansha
- English publisher: NA: Kodansha USA (digital)
- Magazine: Dessert
- Original run: May 24, 2016 – July 24, 2026
- Volumes: 16
- Live-action film
- Directed by: Shōsuke Murakami
- Written by: Junpei Yamaoka
- Studio: Shochiku Studio
- Released: July 8, 2022
- Runtime: 97 minutes

My Boyfriend in Orange (Japanese: モエカレはオレンジ色, Hepburn: Moekare wa Orenji-iro) is a Japanese manga series written and illustrated by Non Tamashima. It was serialized in Dessert from May 2016 to July 2026, with its individual chapters collected into 16 tankōbon volumes. A live-action film adaptation was released in July 2022.

== Media ==
=== Manga ===
The series is written and illustrated by Non Tamashima. It started serialization in Dessert on May 24, 2016. In June 2020, it was revealed the series was going on hiatus for "a little while". It ended serialization on July 24, 2026. 16 tankōbon volumes were released from October 13, 2016 to October 13, 2026.

In December 2017, Kodansha USA announced they licensed the series digitally.

==== Volumes ====
No.	Original release date	Original ISBN	English release date	English ISBN
1	October 13, 2016	978-4-06-365883-5	December 26, 2017	978-1-64-212044-8
2	March 13, 2017	978-4-06-365902-3	January 23, 2018	978-1-64-212012-7
3	August 10, 2017	978-4-06-365918-4	February 27, 2018	978-1-64-212121-6
4	December 13, 2017	978-4-06-510589-4	March 27, 2018	978-1-64-212167-4
5	May 11, 2018	978-4-06-511463-6	September 25, 2018	978-1-64-212431-6
6	September 13, 2018	978-4-06-512873-2	February 26, 2019	978-1-64-212648-8
7	February 13, 2019	978-4-06-514573-9	July 23, 2019	978-1-64-212922-9
8	July 12, 2019	978-4-06-516315-3	November 12, 2019	978-1-64-659118-3
9	January 10, 2020	978-4-06-518168-3	April 14, 2020	978-1-64-659290-6
10	August 12, 2020	978-4-06-520469-6	December 29, 2020	978-1-64-659880-9
11	August 12, 2021	978-4-06-524460-9	December 28, 2021	978-1-63-699540-3
12	April 13, 2022	978-4-06-526844-5	October 4, 2022	978-1-68-491474-6
13	July 13, 2022	978-4-06-528524-4	January 10, 2023	978-1-68-491641-2
14	October 11, 2024	978-4-06-537204-3	February 18, 2025	979-8-89-478371-0
15	August 12, 2025	978-4-06-537204-3	February 17, 2026	979-8-89-478584-4
16	October 13, 2026	978-4-06-544883-0	—	—

=== Live-action film ===
A live-action film adaptation was announced on February 19, 2022. It was directed by Shōsuke Murakami, scripted by Junpei Yamaoka, and distributed by Shochiku. Snow Man member Hikaru Iwamoto and Meru Nukumi played the lead roles. It premiered on July 8, 2022. Nukumi won Newcomer of the Year at the 46th Japan Academy Film Prize for her work on the film.

== Reception ==
Rebecca Silverman from Anime News Network praised the first volume for its romance and emotional moments, while criticizing it for having "uncomfortable daddy issues". She also criticized the art for its drawings of torsos. Christel Scheja from Splash Comics also offered praise for the story, while disagreeing with Silverman over the art, stating the artist "[had] a good eye for details".
