= You Got Me, Sempai! =

Japanese manga series

- Cover of the first volume

まいりました、先輩 (Mairimashita, Senpai)
- Genre: Romance
- Manga
- Written by: Azusa Mase
- Published by: Kodansha
- English publisher: NA: Kodansha USA
- Magazine: Dessert
- Original run: June 24, 2016 – October 24, 2020
- Volumes: 10

You Got Me, Sempai! (Japanese: まいりました、先輩, Hepburn: Mairimashita, Senpai) is a Japanese manga series written and illustrated by Azusa Mase. It was serialized in Kodansha's magazine Dessert from June 2016 to October 2020. It was published in ten tankōbon volumes.

== Publication ==
The series was written and illustrated by Azusa Mase. It was serialized in Kodansha's shōjo manga magazine Dessert between June 24, 2016, and October 24, 2020.

The manga is licensed digitally in English by Kodansha USA.

=== Volume list ===
No.	Original release date	Original ISBN	English release date	English ISBN
1	November 11, 2016	978-4-06-365887-3	April 3, 2018	978-1-64-212213-8
2	April 13, 2017	978-4-06-365906-1	June 5, 2018	978-1-64-212251-0
3	November 13, 2017	978-4-06-510408-8	June 26, 2018	978-1-64-212293-0
4	April 13, 2018	978-4-06-511280-9	August 7, 2018	978-1-64-212398-2
5	October 12, 2018	978-4-06-513171-8	February 5, 2019	978-1-64-212656-3
6	March 13, 2019	978-4-06-514965-2	August 6, 2019	978-1-64-212967-0
7	August 9, 2019	978-4-06-516717-5	November 12, 2019	978-1-64-659115-2
8	January 10, 2020	978-4-06-518229-1	April 14, 2020	978-1-64-659291-3
9	June 11, 2020	978-4-06-519773-8	October 6, 2020	978-1-64-659749-9
10	December 11, 2020	978-4-06-521778-8	September 21, 2021	978-1-63-699369-0

== Reception ==
Volume 3 reached the 29th place on the weekly Oricon manga chart and, as of November 19, 2017, has sold 24,633 copies; volume 4 reached the 33rd place and, as of April 22, 2018, has sold 42,973 copies; volume 5 reached the 21st place and, as of October 21, 2018, has sold 49,132 copies; volume 6 reached the 13th place and, as of March 17, 2019, has sold 35,905 copies.

The first volume was reviewed in Anime News Network by three reviewers. Lynzee Loveridge rated the first volume 4 stars out of 5, praised the manga and described it as a "surprisingly fresh high school romance that doesn't dilly-dally in starry-eyed purity", going on to cite the heroine's proactiveness and the manga's handling of a couple's first argument. Rebecca Silverman rated the volume 2.5 stars out of 5, more critical of the story's lack of tension and stated that the art "doesn't do a terrific job with complex emotions". She described the central relationship as "a low-key, kind of sweet romance". Amy McNulty gave the volume 4 stars out of 5, stating that "volume 1 might present one of the healthiest depictions of romance with a tsundere there is", although she mentioned that the characterization was somewhat shallow and the story lacked secondary characters.
