= Liar × Liar =

Manga series

- First tankōbon volume cover

ライアー×ライアー (Raiā Raiā)
- Genre: Comedy, slice of life
- Manga
- Written by: Renjūrō Kindaichi
- Published by: Kodansha
- English publisher: NA: Kodansha USA (digital)
- Magazine: Dessert
- Original run: February 24, 2010 – June 24, 2017
- Volumes: 10
- Live-action film
- Directed by: Saiji Yakumo
- Written by: Yuichi Tokunaga
- Music by: Koji Endo
- Studio: Asmik Ace, Robot Communications
- Released: February 19, 2021
- Runtime: 117 minutes

Liar × Liar (Japanese: ライアー×ライアー, Hepburn: Raiā Raiā; pronounced "Liar Liar") is a Japanese slice of life comedy manga series written and illustrated by Renjūrō Kindaichi. It's published by Kodansha, with serialization on Dessert magazine.

== Plot ==
College student Minato Takatsuki has a strained relationship with her younger stepbrother, Tooru. One day, while dressed up in her friend's high school uniform, she encounters him. Tooru not only does not seem to recognize her, but he also immediately confesses to her. Minato believes it to be a joke at first, but she later learns that Tooru is genuine with his feelings. Every time Minato makes excuses to distance herself from him, the depth of Tooru's feelings for her alter ego sways her from revealing the truth. In addition, Minato also begins a relationship with her childhood friend, Shinji, in her personal life. Minato is forced to lead two different lives while juggling her relationships with them.

== Characters ==
Minato Takatsuki/ Mina Noguichi/ Miki Noguichi
Voiced by: Minako Kotobuki (Drama CD)
Portrayed by: Nana Mori (Live Action Film)

The protagonist of the story. Twenty-year-old university student, a clean freak and a lover of old Japanese castles. Her friend convinces her to go out dressed as a highschool girl, and she ends up accidentally bumping into her stepbrother Tooru. Minato succeeds in convincing Tooru that she is in fact not his sister, but a highschool girl named Mina Noguichi. Tooru starts to pursue her and Minato ends up dating him under this false identity. Her reason for dating him was to obtain vengeance for all the troubles Tooru caused her in middle and high school. However, she quickly starts to regret her decision and tries to find a way to break up with him, but the circumstances seem to never be in her favor. Things get particularly dicey for her when she finds her popularity increasing and gets into sticky situations because of it.

Tooru Takatsuki
Voiced by: Kōki Uchiyama (Drama CD)
Portrayed by: Hokuto Matsumura (Live Action Film)

The stepbrother of the main character. He's a handsome young man with an expressionless face who has been sleeping with numerous girls ever since middle school. Tooru's active love life brought trouble upon Minato as she was being targeted by his ex-girlfriends and girls who had a crush on Tooru. When he meets Minato dressed as a highschool girl he ends up pursuing her and dating her. He gets serious about her, which worries his sister.

Maki Noguichi
Voiced by: Ayahi Takagaki (Drama CD)
Portrayed by: Mayu Hotta (Live Action Film)

The best friend of the main character. She was the one who convinced Minato to go out dressed in her old school uniform. Later she helps Minato by lending her clothes to wear as Mina, giving her advice and teaching her to do gyaru style makeup. She's the person Minato goes to for advice on all issues related to romance. Maki goes so far as to help Minato get out of a love-triangle, that she finds herself unwittingly caught in.

Shinji Karasuma
Portrayed by: Yuta Koseki

A member of the neighboring universities' Japanese history appreciation club and an architecture student. He is reunited with Minato at a club meeting after being apart for eight years. They originally met at a private evening school when they were still grade-schoolers. The feelings that he has for Minato complicates situations in hilarious or painful ways.

== Media ==
=== Manga ===
The manga began its serialization on February 24, 2010, and ended its serialization on June 24, 2017.

==== Volumes ====
- 1 (November 25, 2010)
- 2 (July 25, 2011)
- 3 (March 24, 2012)
- 4 (February 13, 2013)
- 5 (December 13, 2013)
- 6 (August 12, 2014)
- 7 (May 13, 2015)
- 8 (February 12, 2016)
- 9 (November 11, 2016)
- 10 (September 13, 2017)

=== Live-action film ===
In June 2020, Kodansha announced that the series will be adapted into a live-action film. The film was directed by Saiji Yakumo, with scripts handled by Yuichi Tokunaga. The film premiered in Japan on February 19, 2021.

== Reception ==
Volume 4 reached the 17th place on the weekly Oricon manga charts and, as of February 17, 2013, has sold 33,969 copies; volume 5 reached the 35th place and, as of December 22, 2013, has sold 51,073 copies; volume 6 reached the 19th place and, as of August 17, 2014, has sold 42,008 copies.

It was nominated for Best Shōjo Manga at the 39th Kodansha Manga Awards.

== See also ==
- Haré+Guu - another manga series by the same author.
- La La La - another manga series by the same author.
- Rooming with a Gamer Gal - another manga series by the same author.
