= Love, That's an Understatement =

Japanese manga series

- First tankōbon volume cover

ひかえめに言っても、これは愛 (Hikaeme ni Ittemo, Kore wa Ai)
- Genre: Romantic comedy; Yankī
- Manga
- Written by: Fujimomo
- Published by: Kodansha
- English publisher: NA: Kodansha USA
- Imprint: KC Dessert
- Magazine: Dessert
- Original run: July 26, 2021 – present
- Volumes: 9

Love, That's an Understatement (ひかえめに言っても、これは愛, Hikaeme ni Ittemo, Kore wa Ai) is a Japanese manga series written and illustrated by Fujimomo. It began serialization in Kodansha's shōjo manga magazine Dessert in July 2021.

== Synopsis ==
Risa Amakawa is a self-reliant and independent girl who is unable to rely on others. One day, when she helps the delinquent Zen Ohira out of trouble, Zen wants to repay her to which she refuses. As the two continue to meet, Risa's feelings about self-reliance slowly start to change.

== Publication ==
Written and illustrated by Fujimomo, Love, That's an Understatement began serialization in Kodansha's shōjo manga magazine Dessert on July 26, 2021. Its chapters have been collected into nine tankōbon volumes as of June 2026.

The series is licensed digitally in English by Kodansha USA.

=== Volumes ===
No.	Original release date	Original ISBN	North American release date	North American ISBN
1	December 13, 2021	978-4-06-526210-8	April 25, 2023 (digital); December 10, 2024 (print)	978-1-68-491621-4 (digital); 979-8-88-933684-6 (print)
Stories 1–4
2	June 13, 2022	978-4-06-528146-8	May 23, 2023 (digital); August 5, 2025 (print)	978-1-68-491655-9 (digital); 979-8-89-478049-8 (print)
Stories 5–8
3	March 13, 2023	978-4-06-531099-1	September 12, 2023 (digital); December 9, 2025 (print)	979-8-88-933064-6 (digital); 979-8-89-478050-4 (print)
Stories 9–12
4	October 13, 2023	978-4-06-533354-9	May 21, 2024 (digital); March 3, 2026 (print)	979-8-88-933390-6 (digital); 979-8-89-478051-1 (print)
Stories 13–16
5	April 12, 2024	978-4-06-535285-4	November 5, 2024 (digital); May 12, 2026 (print)	979-8-89-478046-7 (digital); 979-8-89-478052-8 (print)
Stories 17–20
6	December 13, 2024	978-4-06-537802-1	June 10, 2025 (digital); August 18, 2026 (print)	979-8-89-478481-6 (digital); 979-8-88-877941-5 (print)
Stories 21–24
7	June 13, 2025	978-4-06-539786-2; 978-4-06-540192-7 (SE)	February 24, 2026 (digital); September 15, 2026 (print)	979-8-89-478769-5 (digital); 979-8-88-877942-2 (print)
Stories 25–28
8	December 12, 2025	978-4-06-541735-5	June 23, 2026 (digital)	979-8-89-830122-4
Stories 29–32
9	June 12, 2026	978-4-06-543839-8	—	—
Stories: 33-36

== Reception ==
By October 2023, the series had over 600,000 copies in circulation. By June 2026, the series had over 1.8 million copies in circulation.

The series was ranked 2nd in the "I Want to Read It Now" category at Rakuten Kobo's 1st E-book Manga Awards in 2023.

== See also ==
- Lovesick Ellie, another manga series by the same author
