= La La La (manga) =

Japanese manga series

- First tankōbon volume cover

ラララ (Ra Ra Ra)
- Genre: Romance
- Manga
- Written by: Renjuro Kindaichi
- Published by: Square Enix
- English publisher: NA: Comikey Square Enix
- Imprint: Young Gangan Comics
- Magazine: Young Gangan
- Original run: December 7, 2012 – May 21, 2021
- Volumes: 10

La La La (ラララ, Ra Ra Ra) is a Japanese manga series written and illustrated by Renjuro Kindaichi. It was serialized in Square Enix's seinen manga magazine Young Gangan between December 2012 and May 2021.

== Synopsis ==
The protagonist, Shiro Kirishima, is laid off from his company and dumped by his girlfriend at the same time. While he is drinking to drown his sorrows at a bar, a mysterious beautiful woman suddenly asks him if he would like to work for her, and without thinking twice, he signs the documents. When he goes to the designated location the next day, he is informed that it is not at the company but at the woman's home, and that he has registered his marriage with the mysterious woman, Ai Ishimura. The document he signed the night before was a marriage registration form. And so, Shiro's life as a full-time househusband begins by chance. However, Ai has reasons for suddenly marrying Shiro, a nearly total stranger.

== Publication ==
Written and illustrated by Renjuro Kindaichi, La La La was serialized in Square Enix's seinen manga magazine Young Gangan between December 7, 2012, and May 21, 2021. Its chapters were collected into ten tankōbon volumes from October 25, 2013, to September 25, 2021.

The series is published in English by Comikey and by Square Enix via their Manga UP! Global app.

No.	Release date	ISBN
1	October 25, 2013	978-4-7575-4099-6
2	May 24, 2014	978-4-7575-4313-3
3	March 25, 2015	978-4-7575-4594-6
4	February 12, 2016	978-4-7575-4880-0
5	November 11, 2016	978-4-7575-5174-9
6	September 13, 2017	978-4-7575-5468-9
7	September 25, 2018	978-4-7575-5822-9
8	July 12, 2019	978-4-7575-6204-2
9	September 25, 2020	978-4-7575-6859-4
10	September 25, 2021	978-4-7575-7486-1

== Reception ==
The series, alongside Kotaro Lives Alone, won the Men's Comic Prize at NTT Solmare's Electronic Manga Award in 2018.

== See also ==
- Haré+Guu, another manga series by Renjuro Kindaichi
- Liar × Liar, another manga series by Renjuro Kindaichi
- Rooming with a Gamer Gal, another manga series by Renjuro Kindaichi
