= Itsuka Shinu nara E o Utte kara =

Japanese manga series

- First tankōbon volume cover

いつか死ぬなら絵を売ってから
- Manga
- Written by: Parari
- Published by: Akita Shoten
- Imprint: Princess Comics Bonita
- Magazine: Mystery Bonita
- Original run: September 6, 2022 – present
- Volumes: 9

Itsuka Shinu nara E o Utte kara (いつか死ぬなら絵を売ってから; "If I'll Die Someday, It'll Be After I Sell My Art") is a Japanese manga series written and illustrated by Parari. It began serialization in Akita Shoten's Mystery Bonita magazine in September 2022.

== Premise ==
Kazuki is a cleaner who lives in an internet café, whose hobby is drawing. One day, he is encountered by an eccentric man named Tohru, who catches a glimpse at one of Kazuki's illustrations and inquires him to purchase it.

== Publication ==
Written and illustrated by Parari, Itsuka Shinu nara E o Utte kara began serialization in Akita Shoten's Mystery Bonita magazine on September 6, 2022. Its chapters have been compiled into nine tankōbon volumes as of August 2026.

No.	Release date	ISBN
1	June 15, 2023	978-4-253-26394-8
2	December 14, 2023	978-4-253-26395-5
3	May 16, 2024	978-4-253-26396-2
4	July 16, 2024	978-4-253-26397-9
5	November 15, 2024	978-4-253-26398-6
6	April 16, 2025	978-4-253-26399-3
7	October 16, 2025	978-4-253-00462-6
8	March 16, 2026	978-4-253-01231-7
9	August 17, 2026	978-4-253-01894-4

== Reception ==
The first volume featured a recommendation from Fujihiko Hosono.

The series, alongside Fall in Love, You False Angels and Ohitori-sama Hotel, was ranked eighteenth in the 2024 edition of Takarajimasha's Kono Manga ga Sugoi! guidebook for the best manga for female readers. The series, alongside Roaming and Re-Living My Life with a Boyfriend Who Doesn't Remember Me, was ranked fourteenth in the 2025 edition. The series won the Next Impact Comic Award at the 2nd Rakuten Kobo E-book Awards in 2024. The series, alongside How I Met My Soulmate, won the Women's Comic Prize at the 2025 Digital Comic Awards.
