= Kazuyuki Okitsu =

Japanese voice actor and narrator

- 興津 和幸
- Occupations: Voice actor; narrator
- Years active: 2000–present
- Agent: Kekke Corporation
- Notable work: Eren the Southpaw as Yusuke Kamiya; JoJo's Bizarre Adventure as Jonathan Joestar; My Hero Academia as Fat Gum; Berserk as Serpico; Fruits Basket as Hatori Sohma

Kazuyuki Okitsu (興津 和幸, Okitsu Kazuyuki) is a Japanese voice actor and narrator.

== Biography ==
After graduating from the Osaka University of Arts, he was initially represented by the RME talent agency. Okitsu joined Kekke Corporation in May 2007.

== Filmography ==
=== Anime series ===
2007

- Gintama – Kamemiya

2008

- Black Butler – Vincent Phantomhive (Ciel's father)
- Nodame Cantabile: Paris-hen – Theo
- Rosario + Vampire Capu2 – Zashiki-warashi
- Toradora! – Hisamitsu Noto

2009

- Hanasakeru Seishōnen – Izmal
- Modern Magic Made Simple – Karl Cristbarth
- Yu-Gi-Oh! 5D's – Leo (ep.85)

2010

- Kaichō wa Maid-sama! – Kenta; Kouma Yafu "Kou"; Yūta Utsumi
- Ladies versus Butlers! – Akiharu Hino
- Sekirei: Pure Engagement – Yōichi Kimura
- Sengoku Basara: Samurai Kings 2 – Akagawa Motoyasu
- Shiki – Seishin Muroi
- The Qwaser of Stigmata – Tasuku Fujiomi

2011

- Bakuman. 2 – Kim Sunggyu
- Ben-To – Ren Nikaidou
- Cross Fight B-Daman – Laigo Ogra
- Hanasaku Iroha – Haruhiko Komatsu
- Heaven's Memo Pad – Satoshi Teraoka
- Last Exile: Fam, the Silver Wing – Luscinia Hāfez

2012

- Bakuman. 2 & 3 – Ichiriki Orihara; Kim Sunggyu
- JoJo's Bizarre Adventure: Phantom Blood – Jonathan Joestar
- Sket Dance – Jin Kakiuchi
- Uchuu Kyoudai – Rick

2013

- Arpeggio of Blue Steel – Gunzō Chihaya
- Brothers Conflict – Masaomi Asahina
- Genshiken Nidaime – Harunobu Madarame
- Inazuma Eleven GO: Galaxy – Gandales Baran
- Makai Ouji: Devils and Realist – Ernest Crosby
- Futari wa Milky Holmes – John
- Train Heroes – Sam

2014

- Argevollen – Masaru Okui
- Black Bullet – Kazumitsu Tendō
- Cardfight Vanguard: Legion Mate – Raul Sera
- Gundam Build Fighters Try – Minato Sakai
- K: Missing Kings – Nagare Hisui
- Minna Atsumare! Falcom Gakuen – Dark Fact-sensei
- Mobile Suit Gundam-san – Garma-san
- Nanana's Buried Treasure – Isshin Yuiga
- Nobunaga Concerto – Ikeda Tsuneoki
- Shirobako – Shimeji Maitake, Kenichi Mimura, Young Isamu Momose, Wataru Nakabayashi, Composer Manager
- Witch Craft Works – Kyōichirō Mikage
- Your Lie in April – Saitō

2015

- Okusama ga Seitokaichou! – Hayato Izumi
- Aoharu × Machinegun – Nagamasa Midori
- Charlotte – Kazuki Tomori
- Gate – Kouji Sugawara
- Is It Wrong to Try to Pick Up Girls in a Dungeon? – Kashima Oka
- Gintama – Ayao Sarutobi (Male)
- K: Return of Kings – Nagare Hisui
- Overlord – Peter Mork
- Prison School – Reiji "Andre" Andō
- The Rolling Girls – Shidô
- Star-Myu: High School Star Musical – Seishiro Inumine
- The Testament of Sister New Devil BURST – Leohart
- Go! Princess PreCure – Wataru Kaido

2016

- Aokana: Four Rhythm Across the Blue – Kazunari Shindō
- BBK/BRNK – Akihito Tsuwabuki
- Gate: Jieitai Kanochi nite, Kaku Tatakaeri – Enryuu-hen – Kouji Sugawara
- Kuma Miko: Girl Meets Bear – Yoshio Amayadori
- Orange – Saku Hagita
- Tanaka-kun Is Always Listless – Shimura
- Berserk – Serpico
- Handa-kun – Takao Kawafuji
- Touken Ranbu: Hanamaru – Hachisuka Kotetsu

2017

- Fuuka – Kazuya Nachi
- ID-0 – Ido
- Star-Myu: High School Star Musical 2 – Seishiro Inumine
- Altair: A Record of Battles – Konstantinos

2018

- Idolish7 – Banri Ogami
- Touken Ranbu: Hanamaru 2 – Hachisuka Kotetsu
- Sword Art Online Alternative Gun Gale Online – M
- Back Street Girls – Kazuhiko Sugihara
- Cells at Work! – Cedar Pollen
- High Score Girl – Miyao
- Run with the Wind – Yuki

2019

- Fire Force – Karim Fulham
- Fruits Basket – Hatori Sōma
- Fairy Gone – Jonathan Passepierre
- Star-Myu: High School Star Musical 3 – Seishiro Inumine
- Wasteful Days of High School Girls – Masataka "Waseda" Sawatari
- Babylon – Ariyoshi Hanta
- My Hero Academia 4 – Taishiro Toyomitsu / Fat Gum

2020

- number24 – Ethan Taylor
- Appare-Ranman! – Seth Rich Cutter
- Haikyu!! To The Top – Suguru Daishō
- IDOLiSH7: Second Beat! – Banri Ogami
- Tower of God – Evan Edroch
- The Millionaire Detective Balance: Unlimited – HEUSC
- Magatsu Wahrheit -Zuerst- – Conrad

2021

- IDOLiSH7: Third Beat! – Banri Ogami
- Cute Executive Officer – Futo-Riiman (Fat Salaryman)
- So I'm a Spider, So What? – Hyrince Quarto
- Duel Masters King!, Jendol
- Higehiro – Yoshida
- How Not to Summon a Demon Lord Ω – Gewalt
- Full Dive – Amos
- How a Realist Hero Rebuilt the Kingdom – Hakuya Kwonmin
- Night Head 2041 – Michio Sonezaki
- Muteking the Dancing Hero – Vivi

2022

- Love After World Domination – Hayato Ōjino
- Aoashi – Kenta Yoshitsune
- Vermeil in Gold – Shinōji Ryūga
- My Stepmom's Daughter Is My Ex – Mineaki Irido
- The Prince of Tennis II: U-17 World Cup – Alexander Amadeus
- Shinobi no Ittoki – Iboro
- Blue Lock – Zantetsu Tsurugi
- Play It Cool, Guys – Sōta Shiki

2023

- Sugar Apple Fairy Tale – Elliot Collins
- Magical Destroyers – Nick
- Fly Me to the Moon 2nd Season – Ginga Onimaru
- Dr. Stone: New World – Moz
- Reign of the Seven Spellblades – Luther Garland
- Dark Gathering – Nagayama
- Captain Tsubasa: Junior Youth Arc – Gino Hernandez
- Kawagoe Boys Sing – Haruo Hibiki

2024

- Metallic Rouge – Eden Vallock
- Meiji Gekken: 1874 – Gorō Fujita
- Train to the End of the World – Zenjirō
- A Condition Called Love – Yukihiro Kuroe
- Grandpa and Grandma Turn Young Again – Yoshiaki
- Mission: Yozakura Family – Shinzō Yozakura
- The Fable – Akira Satō
- Tadaima, Okaeri – Shūto Matsuo
- Our Last Crusade or the Rise of a New World Season II – Garganly
- No Longer Allowed in Another World – Tōru
- I'll Become a Villainess Who Goes Down in History – Arnold Williams

2025

- With Vengeance, Sincerely, Your Broken Saintess – Cizzy Rubin
- Hotel Inhumans – Roy Murdock
- Necronomico and the Cosmic Horror Show – Hastur
- Night of the Living Cat – Keisuke
- Wind Breaker Season 2 – Kanji Nakamura
- Reincarnated as the Daughter of the Legendary Hero and the Queen of Spirits – Rovel
- Sakamoto Days – Kashima

2026

- The Other World's Books Depend on the Bean Counter – Orjef
- Mao – Shiranui
- Eren the Southpaw – Yūsuke Kamiya
- The Strongest Job Is Apparently Not a Hero or a Sage, but an Appraiser (Provisional)! – Shushin
- Nippon Sangoku – Junichi Tamaki
- Uncle's Obsession with Cute Things – Mitsutaka Oji
- Nia Liston: The Merciless Maiden – Asuma
- Dark Machine: The Animation – Myōjin
- Daemons of the Shadow Realm – Yamashina

=== ONA ===
- A.I.C.O. -Incarnation- (2018) – Ayumi Hori
- Sword Gai: The Animation (2018) – Kazumo
- 7 Seeds (2019) – Mark Ibaraki
- Cagaster of an Insect Cage (2020) – Jin
- The Way of the Househusband (2021) – Masa
- Onimusha (2023) – Kaizen

=== Anime films ===
- Josee, the Tiger and the Fish (2020) – Hayato Matsūra
- Sing a Bit of Harmony (2021) – Gocchan
- Eien no 831 (2022) – Seri Agawa
- The Seven Deadly Sins: Grudge of Edinburgh (2022) – Priest
- Blue Lock: Episode Nagi (2024) – Zantetsu Tsurugi
- Paris ni Saku Étoile (2026) – Fujiko's father

=== Video games ===
- Black Panther 2: Like A Dragon Ashura Chapter (2012) – Tanaka Ichiro
- Brothers Conflict:Brilliant Blue (2012) – Masaomi Asahina
- Brothers Conflict:Passion Pink (2013) – Masaomi Asahina
- JoJo's Bizarre Adventure: All Star Battle (2013) – Jonathan Joestar
- Aokana: Four Rhythm Across the Blue (2014) – Kazunari Shindō
- J-Stars Victory Vs (2015) – Jonathan Joestar
- JoJo's Bizarre Adventure: Eyes of Heaven (2015) – Jonathan Joestar
- IDOLiSH7 (2015) – Banri Ogami
- Overwatch (2016) – Lúcio (Japanese dub)
- Ozmafia!! (2016) – Kyrie
- Ao no Kanata no Four Rhythm – EXTRA1 (2017) – Kazunari Shindō
- Food Fantasy (2018) – Chocolate, Plum Juice, Tempura
- Spider-Man (2018) – Peter Parker / Spider-Man (Japanese dub)
- Nioh 2 (2020) – Azai Nagamasa
- My Hero One's Justice 2 (2020) – Taishiro Toyomitsu / Fat Gum
- Saint Seiya Awakening (2020) – Hypnos
- Gate of Nightmares (2021) – Oristhor
- Ao no Kanata no Four Rhythm – EXTRA2 (2022) – Kazunari Shindō
- Soul Hackers 2 (2022) – Zenon
- JoJo's Bizarre Adventure: Last Survivor (2025) – Jonathan Joestar
- Zenless Zone Zero (2025) – Komano Manato

Unknown date

- Akane-sasu Sekai de Kimi to Utau – Akechi Mitsuhide
- Bloodstained: Ritual of the Night – Johannes
- Dragalia Lost – Ku Hai
- Fate/Extella – Archimedes
- The Order: 1886 – Marquis de Lafayette (Japanese dub)
- Touken Ranbu – Hachisuka Kotetsu
- Warriors All-Stars – Shiki
- Ephemeral -Fantasy on Dark- – Rei

==== Puppetry ====
- Thunderbolt Fantasy – Ān Suǒ Yà Tè

=== Drama CDs ===
- Aokana: Four Rhythm Across the Blue – Kazunari Shindō
- Flutter – Yoshino
- Meshiagare Ai Wo – Harufumi Shunzei
- NightS – Kanjou Spectrum – Nakaya
- Uso Mitai na Hanashi Desu ga – Nakamura
- Datte Maou-sama wa Kare ga Kirai – Mao
- Strawberry Chocolate Vanilla – Mine
- Koi wa Baka de Aru Koto – Maki
- Kashikomarimashita, Destiny (side:Butler) – Ichirou Miyauchi
- Kashikomarimashita, Destiny -Answer- – Ichirou Miyauchi
- Lovesick Ellie – Sumi Shioda

=== Dubbing roles ===
==== Live-action ====
- The 100 – Finn Collins (Thomas McDonell)
- The Big Bang Theory – Raj Koothrappali (Kunal Nayyar)
- Crisis on Earth-X – Mon-El (Chris Wood)
- Extraordinary Attorney Woo – Lee Jun-ho (Kang Tae-oh)
- The Heat – Jason Mullins (Michael Rapaport)
- A Melody to Remember – Second Lieutenant Han Sang-yeok (Yim Si-wan)
- Only the Brave – Brendan McDonough (Miles Teller)
- Supergirl – Mon-El (Chris Wood)
- The Twilight Zone – A. Traveler (Steven Yeun)
- When the Game Stands Tall – Danny Ladouceur (Matthew Daddario)

==== Animation ====
- Nimona – Ambrosius Goldenloin
- Octonauts – Dr. Shellington
- Solar Opposites – Terry
- Star vs. the Forces of Evil – Marco Diaz
