= Living-Room Matsunaga-san =

Japanese manga series

- Cover of the first volume

リビングの松永さん (Living no Matsunaga-san)
- Genre: Romance, slice of life
- Manga
- Written by: Keiko Iwashita
- Published by: Kodansha
- English publisher: NA: Kodansha USA
- Magazine: Dessert
- Original run: December 24, 2016 – June 24, 2021
- Volumes: 11
- Television drama
- Directed by: Junichi Kanai; Ken Higurashi; Takeshi Matsukawa
- Written by: Shigenori Tanabe
- Music by: Akihiro Manabe; Hatazoe Mina
- Studio: Kansai TV; Storm Labels
- Original network: FNS (Kansai TV, Fuji TV)
- Original run: January 9, 2024 – March 26, 2024
- Episodes: 12

Living-Room Matsunaga-san (Japanese: リビングの松永さん, Hepburn: Living no Matsunaga-san) is a Japanese manga series written and illustrated by Keiko Iwashita. It was serialized in Dessert from December 2016 to June 2021. A live-action television drama adaptation aired from January to March 2024.

== Media ==
=== Manga ===
The series is written and illustrated by Keiko Iwashita. It started serialization in Dessert on December 24, 2016. The first volume was released on May 12, 2017. The series ended on June 24, 2021. The eleventh tankōbon volume is the final volume.

At Anime NYC 2017, Kodansha USA announced they licensed the series digitally. At Anime Expo 2019, they announced a print release for the series.

==== Volumes ====
No.	Original release date	Original ISBN	English release date	English ISBN
1	May 12, 2017	978-4-06-365909-2	December 19, 2017	978-1-64-212020-2
2	October 13, 2017	978-4-06-365932-0	January 30, 2018	978-1-64-212075-2
3	February 13, 2018	978-4-06-510913-7	June 12, 2018	978-1-64-212286-2
4	June 13, 2018	978-4-06-511669-2	September 1, 2018	978-1-64-212472-9
5	November 13, 2018	978-4-06-513576-1	February 19, 2019	978-1-64-212682-2
6	May 13, 2019	978-4-06-515515-8	September 17, 2019	978-1-64-659033-9
7	November 13, 2019	978-4-06-517611-5	February 18, 2020	978-1-64-659239-5
8	April 13, 2020	978-4-06-519416-4	August 18, 2020	978-1-64-659649-2
9	October 13, 2020	978-4-06-520973-8	July 6, 2021	978-1-64-659782-6
10	March 12, 2021	978-4-06-522632-2	September 21, 2021	978-1-63-699370-6
11	August 12, 2021	978-4-06-524688-7	February 22, 2022	978-1-63-699629-5

=== Drama ===
A live-action television drama adaptation was announced on November 9, 2023. The drama stars Kento Nakajima and Hikaru Takahashi in lead roles, and is directed by Junichi Kanai, Ken Higurashi, and Takeshi Matsukawa, with scripts written and Shigenori Tanabe. It aired on Kansai TV and Fuji TV's "Tuesday Drama☆Eleven" programming block from January 9 to March 26, 2024.

== Reception ==
Sarah from Anime UK News praised the series, calling the art "attractively drawn" and the plot a "realistic portrayal" of what it was trying to depict. Rebecca Silverman from Anime News Network also praised the series for its plot and artwork, while criticizing some of the characters. Michelle Smith from Manga Bookshelf also offered praise for the art, while disagreeing with Silverman on the characters, stating that they liked them.

The series has 2 million copies in print.
