= Fall in Love, You False Angels =

Japanese manga series

- First tankōbon volume cover

恋せよまやかし天使ども (Koiseyo Mayakashi Tenshi-domo)
- Genre: Romantic comedy
- Manga
- Written by: Coco Uzuki
- Published by: Kodansha
- English publisher: NA: Kodansha USA
- Imprint: KC Dessert
- Magazine: Dessert
- Original run: April 24, 2023 – present
- Volumes: 7
- Anime television series
- Directed by: Yasutomo Okamoto
- Produced by: Yuriko Waki (animation)
- Written by: Yōhei Yamazaki
- Music by: Yūnosuke Senoo; Yuhki Kurihara
- Studio: MAPPA
- Original run: 2027 – scheduled
- icon

Fall in Love, You False Angels (Japanese: 恋せよまやかし天使ども, Hepburn: Koiseyo Mayakashi Tenshi-domo) is a Japanese manga series written and illustrated by Coco Uzuki. It began serialization in Kodansha's shōjo manga magazine Dessert in April 2023. An anime television series adaptation produced by MAPPA is set to premiere in 2027.

The series won the 49th Kodansha Manga Award in the shōjo category in 2025.

== Plot ==
Otogi Katsura portrays an alter ego at school, being known for her angelic personality. However, she is secretly a callous person. Her true self is discovered by Toki Ninomae, who has a similar false persona. They compete for dominance while falling in love through the romantic comedy story.

== Characters ==
Otogi Katsura (桂 おとぎ, Katsura Otogi)
Voiced by: Nao Ojika
The representative for Class 1-A and publicly self-proclaimed "perfect beautiful girl." She is known as the "School Madonna" because of her beauty, proper conduct, and grace. However, the "School Madonna" is merely an alter-ego she shows publicly, in reality, she is a blunt, rough, and tomboyish, at first only known by her childhood best friend Beni. Because of her ability to captivate anyone, she has been nicknamed the Heartthrob Angel (心撃の天使(しんげきのエンジェル), Shingeki no Enjeru), however, she dislikes the name, finding it "unrefined." She mistakenly calls Toki "Ikkoku", not knowing the actual reading of his name. Her secret gets uncovered by Toki after an incident at the train station.
Toki Ninomae (一 刻, Ninomae Toki)
Voiced by: Taito Ban
The vice class representative for Class 1-A, he is considered to be a handsome young man with a tall stature and long hair. He also excels academically and possesses an impeccable, polite demeanor, making him a highly popular "perfectly handsome guy." However, much like Otogi, this is merely a public persona he meticulously crafted, and he has been hiding his true nature underneath. Otogi refers to his true self as "Black Ikkoku."
Beni Momoi (桃井 紅, Momoi Beni)
Otogi's childhood friend and the only one where Otogi shows her true self.
Gen Shirahane (白羽 弦, Shirahane Gen)
Toki's childhood friend who is older than him, he is in charge of running his parent's café.
Nene Ōtori (鳳 ネネ, Ōtori Nene)
A male class fellow of Otogi and Toki, he is very close with Toki. He has a twin brother, Nono.
Nono Ōtori (鳳 ノノ, Ōtori Nono)
Nene's twin brother, he is in the class right next to his older brother.

== Media ==
=== Manga ===
Written and illustrated by Coco Uzuki, Fall in Love, You False Angels began serialization in Kodansha's shōjo manga magazine Dessert on April 24, 2023. Its chapters have been compiled into seven tankōbon volumes as of June 2026.

During their panel at Sakura-Con 2024, Kodansha USA announced that they licensed the series for English publication beginning in Q2 2025.

==== Volumes ====
No.	Original release date	Original ISBN	North American release date	North American ISBN
1	September 13, 2023	978-4-06-532998-6	February 11, 2025	979-8-88877-377-2
1. "The School Madonna" (こちとらマドンナ, Ko Chito ra Madon'na); 2. "Overwriting Embrace" (てごわいトキメキ, Tegowai Tokimeki); 3. "Blossoming Romance" (ざわめきロマンス, Zwameki Romansu); 4. "Surprising Confrontation" (よろめきクギヅケ, Yoromeki Kugidzuke)
2	February 13, 2024	978-4-06-534640-2	April 8, 2025	979-8-88877-378-9
5. "Dizzy Spell" (クラクラ, Kurakura); 6. "Heart Aflutter" (ドキドキ, Dokidoki); 7. "Sparkling Downpour" (キラキラ, Kirakira); 8. "Bubbling Emotions" (グラグラ, Guragura)
3	July 11, 2024	978-4-06-536192-4	June 10, 2025	979-8-88877-472-4
9. "If Possible" (あわよくば, Awayokuba); 10. "If Only" (ねがわくば, Negawa kuba); 11. "If I Could" (いうなれば, Iunareba); 12. "If Maybe" (ともすれば, Tomosureba)
4	December 13, 2024	978-4-06-537807-6	December 16, 2025	979-8-88877-578-3
13. "Round and Round" (めぐりめぐって, Meguri megutte); 14. "Escalating and Escalating" (つもりつもって, Tsumori tsumo tte); 15. "Swirling and Swirling" (めくるめくって, Mekurumeku tte); 16. "Stronger and Stronger" (つのりつのって, Tsunori tsunotte)
5	July 11, 2025	978-4-06-540056-2	June 23, 2026	979-8-88877-807-4
17. "Love Letter" (ラヴ・レター, Ravu retā); 18. "Other Love" (ラヴ・アザー, Ravu azā); 19. "True Love" (ラヴ・トゥルー, Ravu to~urū); 20. "Gimme Love" (ラヴ・ギミー, Ravu gimī)
6	January 13, 2026	978-4-06-541734-8	April 13, 2027	979-8-90074-102-4
21. "Awaken" (めざめよ, Mezameyo); 22. "Perforate" (つらぬけ, Tsuranuke); 23. "Love" (こいせよ, Koiseyo); 24. "Shine" (きらめけ, Kirameke)
7	June 12, 2026	978-4-06-543829-9	—	—
25. "Knocking Heart" (ハートノック, Hātonokku); 26. "Hitting Heart" (ハートヒット, Hātohitto); 27. "Setting Heart" (ハートセット, Hātosetto); 28. "Popping Heart" (ハートポップ, Hātopoppu)

=== Anime ===
An anime television series adaptation was announced on June 12, 2026. It will be produced by MAPPA and directed by Yasutomo Okamoto, with Yōhei Yamazaki handling the series composition, Mariko Oka designing the characters, Yuriko Waki serving as animation producer, Yūnosuke Senoo and Yuhki Kurihara composing the music, and Kensuke Ushio serving as music producer. The series is set to premiere in 2027.

== Reception ==
The series, alongside Itsuka Shinu nara E o Utte kara and Ohitori-sama Hotel, was ranked eighteenth in the 2024 edition of Takarajimasha's Kono Manga ga Sugoi! guidebook for the best manga for female readers. The series was ranked fifth in the 2025 edition, and fifteenth in the 2026 edition. The series was also ranked fourth in the Nationwide Publishers Recommended Comics list of 2024. The series was also ranked ninth in the print category and won the U-Next Prize at the tenth Next Manga Awards in 2024. It was also ranked ninth in the 2025 edition in the same category. The series was ranked fourth in the Nationwide Bookstore Employees' Recommended Comics list of 2025. The series won the 49th Kodansha Manga Award in the shōjo category in 2025. The series was nominated for the 71st Shogakukan Manga Award.
