= Waiting for Spring (manga) =

Japanese manga series

- Cover of the Japanese version of vol. 1, first released on July 11, 2014

春待つ僕ら (Haru Matsu Bokura)
- Genre: Romance, sports (basketball)
- Manga
- Written by: Anashin
- Published by: Kodansha
- English publisher: NA: Kodansha USA; SEA: M&C!
- Imprint: Kodansha Comics
- Magazine: Dessert
- Original run: April 2014 – September 24, 2019
- Volumes: 14
- Live-action film
- Directed by: Yuichiro Hirakawa
- Written by: Satoko Okazaki
- Music by: Yu Takami
- Studio: Office Crescendo; Warner Bros.
- Released: December 14, 2018

Waiting for Spring (Japanese: 春待つ僕ら, Hepburn: Haru Matsu Bokura), released as We Hope For Blooming in Southeast Asia, is a Japanese shōjo manga series by Anashin. It was serialized in the monthly manga magazine Dessert from April 2014 to September 2019, with the chapters collected in 14 tankōbon volumes. During the series' run, a drama CD was released on June 24, 2017. A live-action film adaptation was released on December 14, 2018.

== Plot ==
Mitsuki is a shy first-year student at Seiryo High School struggling to make friends. To her dread, one day, four popular boys from the basketball team, heralded as the school's "four heavenly kings", drop by the café she works at. Initially reluctant, Mitsuki soon develops an unlikely friendship with them, particularly with Towa, even though Seiryo High School's basketball team is banned from dating. Just when Mitsuki finds herself growing fond of Towa, her childhood friend, Aya, returns.

== Characters ==
Mitsuki Haruno (春野 美月, Haruno Mitsuki)
Voiced by: Tomoyo Kurosawa (drama CD); portrayed by Tao Tsuchiya (film)
Mitsuki is a first-year student in class 4 at Seiryo High School. Though shy, she is determined to make new friends.
Towa Asakura (浅倉 永久, Asakura Towa)
Voiced by: Nobunaga Shimazaki (drama CD); portrayed by Takumi Kitamura (film)
Towa is Mitsuki's classmate and a member of Seiryo High School's basketball team. He is indifferent to the attention he receives from girls, but he finds Mitsuki easy to get along with. Over time, he gradually falls in love with Mitsuki.
Rui Miyamoto (宮本 瑠衣, Miyamoto Rui)
Voiced by: Soma Saito (drama CD); portrayed by Yu Inaba (film)
Rui is a first-year student in class 7 and a member of Seiryo High School's basketball team. He is mischievous and loves to pull pranks on Mitsuki. He sees Towa as a rival.
Kyosuke Wakamiya (若宮 恭介, Wakamiya Kyōsuke)
Voiced by: Yuichiro Umehara (drama CD); portrayed by Hayato Isomura (film)
Kyosuke is a second-year student in class 4 and a member of Seiryo High School's basketball team. He gets along with girls very well and earns top scores in his grade.
Ryuji Tada (多田 竜二, Tada Ryūji)
Voiced by: Toshiyuki Toyonaga (drama CD); portrayed by Yosuke Sugino (film)
Ryuji is a second-year student in class 4 and a member of Seiryo High School's basketball team. He is in love with Nanase, but he has trouble telling her his feelings.
Aya Kamiyama (神山 亜哉, Kamiyama Aya)
Voiced by: Tatsuhisa Suzuki (drama CD); portrayed by Yuta Koseki (film)
Aya is a second-year student and the star player of Hōjō High School's basketball team. He is also Mitsuki's childhood friend in elementary school who moved away upon entering middle school. Mitsuki finds him a source of inspiration and had assumed him to be a girl because of his long hair until they reunite when they are older. Aya has been in love with Mitsuki for years and views Towa as competition.
Reina Yamada (山田 レイナ, Yamada Reina)
Voiced by: Mikako Komatsu (drama CD); portrayed by Yuki Saso (film)
Reina is Mitsuki's classmate and friend. She supports the basketball team's no-dating rule because she is a fujoshi and enjoys watching the boys interact with each other. She often takes pictures of the boys, especially during games.
Maki Sudo (宮本 瑠衣, Sudō Maki)
Voiced by: Yō Taichi (drama CD)
Maki is a first year in class 1 who is also on the girls' basketball team. She and Mitsuki become fast friends, but she secretly has feelings for Towa.
Nanase (ナナセ, Nanase)
Voiced by: Kaori Nazuka (drama CD); portrayed by Rika Izumi (film)
Nanase is the owner's daughter of the café Mitsuki works at and is nicknamed as "Nana" for short. Ryuji is in love with her.
Rino (莉乃, Rino)
Rino is the manager of Hōjō High School's basketball team and is in love with Aya.

== Media ==
=== Manga ===
Waiting for Spring is written and illustrated by Anashin. It was serialized in the monthly shōjo manga magazine Dessert from April 24, 2014 to September 24, 2019. The chapters were collected in bound volumes by Kodansha for a total of 14 volumes, released between July 11, 2014, and May 13, 2020. During the series' run, drama CDs were released in limited edition bundles of volumes 7 and 9.

M&C! announced that Waiting for Spring had been licensed in English for Southeast Asian distribution on September 24, 2016, under the manga's original English subtitle We Hope For Blooming. Kodansha USA announced that Waiting for Spring had been licensed in English for North American distribution on October 6, 2016, with the first volume releasing in summer 2017.

No.	Title	Original release date	English release date
1	Waiting for Spring, Volume 1 Haru Matsu Bokura (春待つ僕ら)	July 11, 2014; 978-4-06-365778-4	July 18, 2017; 978-1-63-2365163
1. "A Precious Place" (だいじなばしょ, Daiji na Basho); 2. "My Friends" (わたしのともだち, Watashi no Tomodachi); 3. "Time with You" (きみとのじかん, Kimi to no Jikan); 4. "The Truth is" (ほんとはね, Honto wa ne); 5. "The Big Game" (だいじなしあい, Daiji na Shiai)
2	Waiting for Spring, Volume 2: Unexpected Turns; Haru Matsu Bokura (春待つ僕ら)	February 13, 2015; 978-4-06-365805-7	September 5, 2017; 978-1-63-236517-0
6. Chapter 6 (あやちゃんショック, Aya-chan Shokku); 7. Chapter 7 (ねがいごとシュート, Negaigoto to Shūto); 8. Chapter 8 (ほんねトーク, Honne Tōku); 9. Chapter 9 (どきどきタイム, Dokidoki Taimu); 10. Chapter 10 (あやちゃんアタック, Aya-chan Atakku); Bonus comic: Sore wa Asa no Dekigoto Deshita. (それは朝の出来事でした。)
3	Waiting for Spring, Volume 3: Courting on the Court; Haru Matsu Bokura (春待つ僕ら)	August 12, 2015; 978-4-06-365828-6	November 28, 2017; 978-1-63-236518-7
11. Chapter 11 (友達です…けど？, Tomodachi desu... kedo?); 12. Chapter 12 (前途多難の予感…？, Zentotanan no Yokan...?); 13. Chapter 13 (本気の恋…来た？, Honki no Koi... Kita?); 14. Chapter 14 (あの子とあんな事…!?」, Ano Ko to Anna Koto...!?); 15. Chapter 15 (本気の行方は…!?, Honki no Yukue wa...!?); Bonus comic
4	Waiting for Spring, Volume 4: Hoop Dreams; Haru Matsu Bokura (春待つ僕ら)	February 12, 2016; 978-4-06-365854-5	January 16, 2018; 978-1-63-236585-9
16. Chapter 16 (ちゃんと見ててね美月, Chanto Mitete ne Mitsuki); 17. Chapter 17 (絶対負けねーから, Zettai Makenē kara); 18. Chapter 18 (ちゃんといたりするよ, Chanto Itari Suru yo); 19. Chapter 19 (素直でよろしい, Sunao de Yoroshii); 20. Chapter 20 (ゲン担ぎでもなんでもやっとくんだ, Gen Katsugi demo Nandemo Yattokun da)
5	Waiting for Spring, Volume 5: In Circles; Haru Matsu Bokura (春待つ僕ら)	July 13, 2016; 978-4-06-365869-9	March 27, 2018; 978-1-63-236516-3
21. Chapter 21 (ミラクル観覧車, Mirakuru Kanransha); 22. Chapter 22 (友情デート, Yūjō Dēto); 23. Chapter 23 (モヤモヤ花火, Moyamoya Hanabi); 24. Chapter 24 (純情サマーナイト, Junjō Samā Naito)
6	Waiting for Spring, Volume 6: A Most Festive Rivalry; Haru Matsu Bokura (春待つ僕ら)	December 13, 2016; 978-4-06-365888-0	May 29, 2018; 978-1-63-236587-3
25. "One on One"; 26. "Revenge"; 27. "Promise"; 28. "Because You"; Bonus comic
7	Waiting for Spring, Volume 7: One-on-One; Haru Matsu Bokura (春待つ僕ら)	May 12, 2017; 978-4-06-365907-8 (regular edition); ISBN 978-4-06-358846-0 (limited edition drama CD bundle)	July 10, 2018; 978-1-63-236631-3
26. Chapter 26 (文化祭前夜, Bunkasai Zenya); 27. Chapter 27 (文化祭本番（前編）, Bunkasai (Zen-pen)); 28. Chapter 28 (文化祭本番（中編）, Bunkasai (Chū-hen)); 29. Chapter 29 (文化祭本番（後編）, Bunkasai (Kō-pen))
8	Waiting for Spring, Volume 8: Puppy Love; Haru Matsu Bokura (春待つ僕ら)	October 13, 2017; 978-4-06-365933-7	September 11, 2018; 978-1-63-236690-0
9	Waiting for Spring, Volume 9: Love Triangles; Haru Matsu Bokura (春待つ僕ら)	March 3, 2018; 978-4-06-511117-8 (regular edition); ISBN 978-4-06-510825-3 (limited edition drama CD bundle)	November 13, 2018; 978-1-63-236691-7
10	Waiting for Spring, Volume 10: In Hot Water; Haru Matsu Bokura (春待つ僕ら)	August 9, 2018; 978-4-06-512502-1	January 22, 2019; 978-1-63-236742-6
11	Waiting for Spring, Volume 11: The New Team Tournament; Haru Matsu Bokura (春待つ僕ら)	December 13, 2018; 978-4-06-513840-3	July 23, 2019; 978-1-63-236738-9
12	Waiting for Spring, Volume 12; Haru Matsu Bokura (春待つ僕ら)	June 13, 2019; 978-4-06-516256-9 (regular edition); ISBN 978-4-06-515600-1 (limited edition postcard & drama CD bundle)	December 31, 2019; 978-1-63-236859-1
13	Waiting for Spring, Volume 13; Haru Matsu Bokura (春待つ僕ら)	December 13, 2019; 978-4-06-518061-7	September 1, 2020; 978-1-63-236942-0
14	Waiting for Spring, Volume 14; Haru Matsu Bokura (春待つ僕ら)	May 13, 2020; 978-4-06-519499-7 (regular edition); ISBN 978-4-06-519500-0 (limited edition with mini art book)	January 26, 2021; 978-1-64-651148-8

=== Film ===
A live-action film adaptation was announced in March 2018 and released in theaters on December 14, 2018. The film is directed by Yuichiro Hirakawa and written by Satoko Okazaki, produced and distributed by Office Crescendo and Warner Bros., The film stars Tao Tsuchiya as Mitsuki, Yuta Koseki as Aya, Takumi Kitamura as Towa, Yu Inaba as Rui, Hayato Isomura as Kyōsuke, and Yosuke Sugino as Ryuji. Additional cast members include Rika Izumi as Nanase, Yuki Saso as Reina, and Tamaki Ogawa as Yuko (Aya's mother).

== Reception ==
Rebecca Silverman from Anime News Network praised Mitsuki's character and the overall story composition.

Volume 2 debuted at #49 on Oricon and sold 15,428 copies in its first week. Volume 3 debuted at #24 on Oricon with 44,674 copies sold in its first week and fell to #46 with 21,443 copies sold in its second week, totaling 66,117 copies sold overall. Volume 4 debuted at #5 on Oricon with 47,250 copies sold in its first week and 119,395 copies sold overall. Volume 5 debuted at #9 on Oricon with 80,699 copies sold in its first week and 135,329 copies sold overall. Volume 6 debuted at #9 on Oricon with 95,329 copies sold in its first week and 203,581 copies sold, making it the 98th best-selling manga in Japan for the first half of 2017. Volume 7 debuted at #8 on Oricon with 52,563 copies sold in its first week and 140,115 copies sold overall. Volume 8 debuted at #6 on Oricon with 60,037 copies sold in its first week and 140,396 copies sold overall. Volume 9 debuted at #4 on Oricon with 52,563 copies sold in its first week and 139,640 copies sold overall. Volume 10 debuted at #11 on Oricon with 68,150 copies sold in its first week and 144,725 copies sold overall.

Waiting for Spring was nominated for the 41st Annual Kodansha Manga Awards under the Best Shojo Manga category. The first two volumes were included in the 2018 list of Great Graphic Novels for Teens produced by American Library Association's Young Adult Library Services Association.

== See also ==
- How I Met My Soulmate, another manga series by the same author
