= Haré+Guu =

Japanese manga series

- Cover art for the first DVD featuring Haré (left) and Guu (right).

ジャングルはいつもハレのちグゥ (Janguru wa Itsumo Hare nochi Gū)
- Genre: Surreal comedy
- Manga

Jungle wa Itsumo Hare nochi Guu
- Written by: Renjuro Kindaichi
- Published by: Enix; Square Enix
- Magazine: Monthly Shōnen Gangan
- Original run: 24 January 1997 – 12 December 2002
- Volumes: 10
- Anime television series
- Directed by: Tsutomu Mizushima
- Written by: Michiko Yokote
- Music by: Akifumi Tada
- Studio: Shin-Ei Animation
- Licensed by: NA: AN Entertainment (expired)
- Original network: TXN (TV Tokyo)
- English network: US: Funimation Channel
- Original run: 3 April 2001 – 25 September 2001
- Episodes: 26
- Original video animation

Haré+Guu DELUXE
- Directed by: Tsutomu Mizushima
- Written by: Michiko Yokote
- Music by: Akifumi Tada
- Studio: Shin-Ei Animation
- Licensed by: NA: AN Entertainment (expired)
- Released: 25 August 2002 – 25 January 2003
- Runtime: 26 minutes
- Episodes: 6
- Manga

Hareguu
- Written by: Renjuro Kindaichi
- Published by: Square Enix
- Magazine: Monthly Shōnen Gangan
- Original run: January 2003 – 12 September 2009
- Volumes: 10
- Original video animation

Haré+Guu FINAL
- Directed by: Tsutomu Mizushima
- Written by: Michiko Yokote
- Music by: Akifumi Tada
- Studio: Shin-Ei Animation
- Released: 21 December 2003 – 25 June 2004
- Runtime: 26 minutes
- Episodes: 7

Haré+Guu (Japanese: ジャングルはいつもハレのちグゥ, Hepburn: Janguru wa Itsumo Hare nochi Gū; lit. 'The Jungle Was Always Sunny, Then Came Guu') is a Japanese manga series written and illustrated by Renjuro Kindaichi which ran in Square Enix's Monthly Shōnen Gangan magazine from 1997 to 2002. A sequel ran from 2003 to 2009. The series focuses on the story of a ten-year-old boy named Haré who lives in the jungle and his misadventures with Guu, a liminal being who usually presents herself as a young girl.

It was adapted into a 26-episode anime television series, followed by two OVA sequels: Haré+Guu DELUXE and Haré+Guu FINAL.

== Plot ==
Haré+Guu opens with a pregnant Weda leaving her home in an unnamed city.

It then flashes forward to the present where Haré is a typical boy living in an unnamed village in an unidentified jungle with his lazy mother Weda. On his way back from his errand of fetching bananas, a large dark being overtakes him. Scared, he runs back to the house where his mom has decided to have a new guest, a cute girl named Guu.

The next morning, Haré wakes up to find Guu a completely different person who is no longer cute, social, or energetic. No one seems to notice the change. Guu mostly remains quiet and ignorant of things while Haré has to show her around and explain things. Haré notices Guu likes to eat things. She swallows Haré but, instead of dying, he is taken to another world in Guu's stomach. There he meets Seiichi and Tomoyo, a couple who has accepted their fate in Guu's stomach. After Guu spits Haré out, she accompanies him to school where she meets all of Haré's schoolmates (whom she swallows and spits back out) and the village elder (whose chest hair she rips out).

The school receives a new doctor named Dr. Clive who came from the city and turns out to be Haré's long-lost dad. Most of the other characters start developing personalities and eccentricities of their own. Guu goes from being silent to being extremely cynical and sarcastic towards Haré and the others. She starts being more antagonistic towards Haré. Guu starts causing shenanigans around the jungle that are meant to keep her amused (like holding a contest for Weda). She adds another resident to her stomach world, Miss Hiroko Yamada, and shows an adult form that she uses to defend Haré. Another person who appears is Dama, a hairdresser from the next village over who obsesses over her long-lost husband with white hair that she mistakes Dr. Clive for.

Bel and Asio, two servants who worked for Weda in her past life, visit the jungle. They claim that they are on vacation and wanted to see their old master. They relieve Haré of his chores around the house and Haré enjoys having to do less work.

Guu causes more disasters around the jungle such as creating a blizzard and bringing down the wrath of Dama upon Clive. Clive finally dyes his hair black to have Dama leave him alone. Haré finds out from Asio the circumstances behind Weda leaving her past life and why Weda is living in they jungle. Weda eventually forces Bel and Asio to tell the actual reason they came to the jungle: to bring Weda and Haré back to the city since her father had recently died. Weda refuses at first, but relents much to Haré's chagrin.

Haré, Weda, Guu, Bel, and Asio make it to the city where they are met by Robert, a personal bodyguard hired to protect Haré and Weda. Robert initially dislikes Weda. When Haré and Guu are held hostage by a bank robber, Weda and Robert team up to proficiently take out the robber, safely returning Haré and Guu. Haré easily adjusts to luxurious life in the mansion while Weda is bored.

Clive comes to the city where he finally is able to convey his feelings for Weda, ensuring them to be a couple whenever Weda returns. Guu causes more hijinks by swallowing up all the servants in a game of tag. While Haré is running away, he runs into his long-lost grandmother Sharon. He then plans to have Weda and Sharon make up. Try as he might, all seemed lost as Weda was bored enough to want to return to the jungle much to Bel and Asio's chagrin. Fortunately, Haré manages to knock some sense into her. Just as Weda was about to visit her mom, Sharon rides up and the two make up.

Haré, Weda, and Guu are back in the jungle with Clive now living permanently with Haré. Haré meets the new teacher while Lazy-Sensei was sick named Miss Yumi. Her temperament has prevented her from getting a boyfriend. She ends up falling for Haré and harassing him for the next two arcs despite their age difference. Meanwhile, the village elder's chest hair gets so out of control he is swallowed by it enough for him to disappears for the rest of the arc.

Weda announces she's pregnant and Clive decides that it is time to marry. After they marry, Haré starts hating the idea of another sibling as he will be the one to take care of the child due to his parents' laziness. Guu takes him back to the past where he inadvertently ran into Weda. It turns out she is lazy due to the advice he gave her to be more honest with herself. He makes up a fake name while meeting Weda which Weda uses in the present to call her second child.

The bank robber returns to exact his revenge on Weda for foiling him. When it looked like he was about to win, Dama shows up at the last minute to fight the bank robber. Dama ends up winning and the two eventually get married.

Bel misses Weda and sends out a video letter to the jungle. Weda agrees to come back to the city to visit Bel and her mom. She drags Haré and Guu back with her. Haré becomes bored, so Weda enrolls him in school where he meets and instantly falls in love with Rita. Unfortunately, it works against Haré because the school bullies get jealous of the new friendship he has formed with Rita; they bully him. Haré finds out that he is nothing special to Rita because she likes to feel superior by being nice to everyone and not making any enemies. She is only looking out for her own self interests. Eventually, Rita sees Haré for the friend he is and learns to care about others.

Weda resolves things at home, which allows Haré and Guu to return to the jungle. The village elder, who is basically a hairball now, is found while Haré gets help with Ame thanks to Adult Guu and the three residents in Guu's stomach. As life seems to go back to normal for Haré (as normal as life with Guu can be), assassins hired by Weda's siblings show up to kill her because of a new discovery that Weda was included in a later version of her father's will, entitling her to a part of the family fortune. Dama returns as one of the assassins hired to kill Weda, but Robert manages to talk her into going back to life with her husband. After seven attempts on her life, Weda resolves to go to the city to bring the fight to her siblings.

Weda goes to the city to settle things, and she brings all the kids from the jungle with her. They first run into trouble when two more assassins, Alex and Shirly, cause their plane to crash on an island. The two beg for their lives in front of Robert. On the island, they meet a muscle man named QP who becomes a rival to Robert and a bodyguard for Weda. When they get off the island they return to Weda's family's mansion where everyone makes plans to go to school.

At school, Haré reunites with Rita who has matured very much. So has Yohan who still has anger and hatred towards Haré. Toposte takes over his class and becomes almost a god to the other students. He was just being controlled by his chest hair and is saved when Haré removes it. Later, Guu gets a stomachache and Haré goes into her stomach to find the problem. He finds himself back in the RPG world where he discovers Guu has eaten the Baka Couple and Grandma Dama. She also ate Dama's sister Tama who tells them the whole story behind her and her sister. Upon returning, Haré meets his aunt, uncle, and cousin. Weda makes up with her siblings but Haré and his cousin, Alva, still fight.

Guu is kidnapped by Haré and Guu — from a half year in the future — who came to find Dama and her sister. Haré, Guu, and their future counterparts find the two, but it is too late. They had already merged and become a giant monster, seeking to destroy the world. Haré and Guu are able to stop the monster, and Dama makes up with her sister. The story arc ends with everyone returning to the jungle. This time, Wigle stays in the city and Alva goes with everyone.

Weda returns everyone to the jungle. This time, they are bringing Haré's cousin Alva with them. After some heartfelt goodbyes with their classmates, the kids of the jungle return home except for Wigle who stays to attend college. At first returning, Yumi-sensei is there waiting to have a passionate reunion with Toposte, who hides from her. It gets to the point where Toposte is not safe anywhere, so he fakes an illness to keep her away. But, because Yumi-sensei offered her life for his safety, Toposte realized how she cared for him and accepted and returned her love.

Alva isn't used to the jungle so he sometimes gets lost and has to be returned by a very large pokute. Later, Haré and Guu decide to find where pokutes come from, learning that they reside in a dark cave deep in the jungle where they are also able to talk. They learn of the pokutes' relation with humans.

Gupta wants to reveal his love for Ravenna but he can't get up the courage, so Guu goes with him for a practice date. This, of course, does not help at all. Then, with the urge to try to get Haré to love her, Mari takes him around to find how love really is, where they learn the true story behind the baka couple.

== Media ==
=== Manga ===
The series, written and illustrated by Renjuro Kindaichi, was published from 24 January 1997, to 12 December 2002 in Enix's (later Square Enix's) Monthly Shōnen Gangan magazine, and was collected in ten volumes. A sequel, Hareguu ran in the same magazine from January 2003, to 12 September 2009 and was also collected in ten volumes.

=== Anime ===
The anime television series, animated by Shin-Ei Animation, was broadcast by TV Tokyo from April 3 to September 25, 2001.

== Reception ==
Haré+Guu was received generally positively by critics. Theron Martin of Anime News Network notes of the early episodes that watching the series "involves taking a walk on the weird side. Its comedic weirdness works more often than not, however, and may grow on you.". Reviewing the DVD release of the latter part of the series, Carl Kimlinger, of the same publication, states that it is "a fitting send-off for of one of last year's better comedies.".

The Encyclopedia of Science Fiction described Hare+Guu as a fun, farcical and occasionally touching anime, praising its surreal humor and the unpredictable antics of Guu, whose mysterious nature and extraordinary abilities continually disrupt the protagonist's life. It highlighted the series' frequent breaking of the fourth wall, including jokes about character roles, narrative clichés and the original manga. The encyclopedia also noted the ambiguity surrounding Guu's origins and motivations, suggesting that despite her apparent delight in tormenting Hare, she might sometimes have his best interests at heart. Although it found Guu consistently entertaining, it criticized the show's repetitive humor, particularly Hare's exaggerated reactions, and recommended watching it in small doses.

== See also ==
- La La La - another manga series made by the same author.
- Liar × Liar - another manga series made by the same author.
- Rooming with a Gamer Gal - another manga series made by the same author.
