= Dessert (magazine) =

Japanese manga magazine

- Cover of the April 2011 issue, featuring My Little Monster by Robico
- Categories: Shōjo/Josei manga
- Frequency: Monthly
- Circulation: 19,000; (July–September 2026)
- First issue: July 1996
- Company: Kodansha
- Country: Japan
- Based in: Tokyo
- Language: Japanese
- Website: go-dessert.jp

Dessert (Japanese: デザート, Hepburn: Dezāto) is a Japanese shōjo and josei manga magazine published by Kodansha. Originally launching as a supplementary issue to Kiss, it began as a new shōjo magazine in July 1996 after the demise of Shōjo Friend. The series that were still ongoing in Shōjo Friend were then moved to Dessert or to its special edition The Dessert.

== Serializations ==
=== Current ===
- My Boyfriend in Orange (2016)
- A Sign of Affection (2019)
- In the Clear Moonlit Dusk (2020)
- And Yet, You Are So Sweet (2020)
- How I Met My Soulmate (2021)
- Love, That's an Understatement (2021)
- Choking on Love (2022)
- Fall in Love, You False Angels (2023)
- Okuremashite Seishun (2023)
- Amelia's Curious Romance (2025)
- Tell Me, Dear Butler (2025)

=== Past ===
- Confidential Confessions (2000–2002)
- Boys Esté (2003–2007)
- Say I Love You (2008–2017)
- My Little Monster (2008–2013)
- Liar × Liar (2010–2017)
- House of the Sun (2010–2015)
- Real Girl (2011–2016)
- Waiting for Spring (2014–2019)
- Wake Up, Sleeping Beauty (2014–2017)
- Our Precious Conversations (2015–2019)
- Lovesick Ellie (2015–2020)
- Living-Room Matsunaga-san (2016–2021)
- You Got Me, Sempai! (2016–2020)
- A Condition Called Love (2017–2025)
- Getting Closer to You (2020–2023)
- Backflip!! (2021)
- Love Out on a Limb (2022–2025)
- In So Deep It's Love Already (2022–2025)

== Related magazines ==
- Aria
- Bessatsu Friend
- Kiss
- Nakayoshi
- Shōjo Friend
- Suspense & Horror
