= Tell Me, Dear Butler =

Japanese manga series

- First tankōbon volume cover

おしえて執事くん (Oshiete Shitsuji-kun)
- Genre: Romantic comedy
- Manga
- Written by: Michi Masaki
- Published by: Kodansha
- English publisher: Kodansha: NA: Kodansha USA
- Imprint: KC Dessert
- Magazine: Dessert
- Original run: April 24, 2025 – present
- Volumes: 3

Tell Me, Dear Butler (Japanese: おしえて執事くん, Hepburn: Oshiete Shitsuji-kun) is a Japanese manga series written and illustrated by Michi Masaki. It began serialization in Kodansha's shōjo manga magazine Dessert in April 2025.

== Synopsis ==
Kikyo has long held feelings for her butler Hanayagi since the day they met due to Hanayagi's desire to treat her as an equal. Whenever she approaches Hanayagi with a confession, Hanayagi shows no interest in responding, which frustrates Kikyo.

== Publication ==
Written and illustrated by Michi Masaki, Tell Me, Dear Butler began serialization in Kodansha's shōjo manga magazine Dessert on April 24, 2025. Its chapters have been collected in three tankōbon volumes as of August 2026.

The series' chapters are published in English on Kodansha's K Manga app. In October 2026, Kodansha USA announced that it had licensed the series for English publication, with the first volume set to release in Q4 2027.

No.	Release date	ISBN
1	September 12, 2025	978-4-06-540450-8
2	February 13, 2026	978-4-06-542473-5
3	August 12, 2026	978-4-06-544511-2; 978-4-06-544650-8 (SE)

== Reception ==
The series, alongside Kaseifu Kuma-san and I, the Wicked Woman of High Society, won the inaugural Honto Aotagai Comic Award in the Women's Category. The series was ranked fourteenth in the print category at the twelfth Next Manga Awards in 2026.
