= Signal 100 =

2019 Japanese horror film

- Theatrical release poster

Japanese name
- Kanji: シグナル100
Transcriptions
- Revised Hepburn: Shigunaru 100
- Directed by: Lisa Takeba
- Based on: Signal 100 by Arata Miyatsuki and Shigure Kondo
- Starring: Kanna Hashimoto; Yuta Koseki; Toshiki Seto
- Release dates: October 2019 (Sitges); 24 January 2020 (Japan)
- Running time: 88 minutes
- Country: Japan
- Language: Japanese

Signal 100 (Japanese: シグナル100, Hepburn: Shigunaru 100) is a 2019 Japanese horror film directed by Lisa Takeba. Based on the manga of the same name written by Arata Miyatsuki and illustrated by Shigure Kondo, the film stars Kanna Hashimoto and Yuta Koseki.

Signal 100 premiered at the Sitges Film Festival in October 2019. It received a theatrical release in Japan on 24 January 2020.

== Cast ==
- Kanna Hashimoto as Rena Kashimura
- Yuta Koseki as Sota Sakaki
- Toshiki Seto as Hayato Wada
- Shouma Kai as Seiya Saionji
- Masaki Nakao as Subaru Fujiharu
- Shodai Fukuyama as Gen Kirino
- Keisuke Nakata as Kenta Hashiba

== Release ==
Signal 100 had its world premiere at the Sitges Film Festival in Sitges, Spain, in October 2019. It was released in Japan across theatres nationwide on 24 January 2020.

On 24 January 2023, the film was made available in the United States on the streaming service Screambox.
