= Wake Up, Sleeping Beauty =

Japanese manga series

- Cover of the first volume

おはよう、いばら姫 (Ohayou, Ibarahime)
- Genre: Drama, romance, fantasy
- Manga
- Written by: Megumi Morino
- Published by: Kodansha
- English publisher: NA: Kodansha USA
- Magazine: Dessert
- Original run: November 22, 2014 – May 24, 2017
- Volumes: 6

Wake Up, Sleeping Beauty (Japanese: おはよう、いばら姫, Hepburn: Ohayou, Ibarahime; lit. "Good Morning, Thorn Princess") is a Japanese manga series written and illustrated by Megumi Morino. It was serialized in Kodansha's shōjo manga magazine Dessert from November 2014 to May 2017. It was published in six tankōbon volumes.

== Publication ==
The series is written and illustrated by Megumi Morino. It was serialized in Kodansha's Dessert from November 22, 2014, to May 24, 2017. Its chapters were collected in six tankōbon volumes from April 2015 to July 2017.

During their panel at New York Comic Con 2016, Kodansha USA announced that they licensed the manga for English publication.

=== Volume list ===
No.	Original release date	Original ISBN	English release date	English ISBN
1	April 13, 2015	978-4-06-365813-2	December 5, 2017	978-1-63-236519-4
2	September 11, 2015	978-4-06-365832-3	January 16, 2018	978-1-63-236588-0
3	February 12, 2016	978-4-06-365855-2	March 20, 2018	978-1-63-236589-7
4	July 13, 2016	978-4-06-365871-2	May 15, 2018	978-1-63-236590-3
5	January 13, 2016	978-4-06-365892-7	July 17, 2018	978-1-63-236591-0
6	July 13, 2017	978-4-06-365914-6	September 25, 2018	978-1-63-236592-7

== Reception ==
In the 2016 edition of Takarajimasha's Kono Manga ga Sugoi! guidebook, the series ranked 20th in the list for female audiences.

== See also ==
- A Condition Called Love – Another manga series by the same author
