= Rooming with a Gamer Gal =

Japanese manga series

- First tankōbon volume cover

ゆうべはお楽しみでしたね (Yūbe wa Otanoshimi Deshita ne)
- Genre: Romantic comedy
- Manga
- Written by: Renjuro Kindaichi
- Published by: Square Enix
- English publisher: Square Enix
- Imprint: Young Gangan Comics
- Magazine: Gangan Online; Young Gangan
- Original run: June 20, 2014 – present
- Volumes: 13
- Television drama
- Directed by: Kiyotaka Taguchi
- Written by: Kouta Fukihara
- Original network: MBS TV, TBS, HBC, CBC
- Original run: January 7, 2019 – February 11, 2019
- Episodes: 6

Rooming with a Gamer Gal (ゆうべはお楽しみでしたね, Yūbe wa Otanoshimi Deshita ne; lit. "Seems like you had fun last night" or "Thou hast had a good night's sleep I hope" (Note: As this line was translated in the Dragon Quest GBC port)) is a Japanese manga series written and illustrated by Renjuro Kindaichi. The premise focuses on people who play the MMORPG Dragon Quest X. It began serialization on Square Enix's Gangan Online manga website in June 2014. It also began serialization in Square Enix's seinen manga magazine Young Gangan the same month. A six-episode live-action television drama adaptation aired from January to February 2019.

== Plot ==
The series is centered around two gamers who are members of the same party in the MMORPG Dragon Quest X. Takumi Satsuki, a man in his early 20s who plays the game using a female Poppet avatar named Powder, and Miyako Okamoto, a gyaru who plays the game using a male Ogre avatar named Goro. The two befriend each other while playing DQX, and decide to move in to a shared house complex, without any prior knowledge of the other's real gender. The series focuses on their relationship, and interactions with other members of their party.

== Media ==
=== Manga ===
Written and illustrated by Renjuro Kindaichi, Rooming with a Gamer Gal began serialization on Square Enix's Gangan Online manga website on June 20, 2014. It also began serialization in Square Enix's seinen manga magazine Young Gangan the following day. The series' chapters have been compiled into thirteen tankōbon volumes as of October 2026. The series is published in English on Square Enix's Manga UP! Global app.

No.	Release date	ISBN
1	March 25, 2015	978-4-7575-4595-3
2	February 12, 2016	978-4-7575-4881-7
3	November 11, 2016	978-4-7575-5175-6
4	September 13, 2017	978-4-7575-5469-6
5	August 27, 2018	978-4-7575-5823-6
6	January 25, 2019	978-4-7575-5984-4
7	May 13, 2020	978-4-7575-6622-4
8	June 24, 2021	978-4-7575-7331-4
9	June 23, 2022	978-4-7575-7981-1
10	September 25, 2023	978-4-7575-8808-0
11	October 25, 2024	978-4-7575-9481-4
12	November 25, 2025	978-4-301-00190-4
13	October 23, 2026	978-4-301-00829-3

=== Drama ===
A six-episode live-action television drama adaptation aired on MBS TV and other networks from January 7 to February 11, 2019. The series starred Amane Okayama as Takumi Satsuki (Powder) and Tsubasa Honda as Miyako Okamoto (Goro).

== Reception ==
In 2019, the series, alongside Oni o Kau, won the Men's Comic Prize at NTT Solmare's "Minna ga Erabu!! Denshi Comic Taishō 2019".

== See also ==
- Haré+Guu, another manga series by Renjuro Kindaichi
- La La La, another manga series by Renjuro Kindaichi
- Liar × Liar, another manga series by Renjuro Kindaichi
