= Lovesick Ellie =

Japanese manga series

- Cover of the first volume

恋わずらいのエリー (Koi Wazurai no Erī)
- Genre: Romantic comedy
- Manga
- Written by: Fujimomo
- Published by: Kodansha
- English publisher: NA: Kodansha USA
- Magazine: Dessert
- Original run: July 24, 2015 – May 23, 2020
- Volumes: 12
- Live-action film
- Directed by: Miki Kōichirō
- Written by: Satoko Okazaki
- Studio: Shochiku
- Released: March 15, 2024

Lovesick Ellie (Japanese: 恋わずらいのエリー, Hepburn: Koi Wazurai no Erī) is a Japanese manga series written and illustrated by Fujimomo. It was serialized in Kodansha's Dessert magazine from July 2015 to May 2020. It was published in twelve tankōbon volumes. A live-action film adaptation premiered in Japanese theaters in March 2024.

== Synopsis ==
Eriko "Ellie" Ichimura is an ordinary high-school girl whose shy personality makes her a wallflower. She has a strong hyperfixation on the school's most popular boy, Akira Ohmi. Ellie frequently fantasizes about Ohmi, posting these fantasy scenarios of hers on an anonymous Twitter account, under the handle "Lovesick Ellie".

== Media ==
=== Manga ===
The series is written and illustrated by Fujimomo. It started serialization in Kodansha's Dessert magazine on July 24, 2015. A promotion was held on Twitter to celebrate the release of the second volume. In the tenth volume of the series, it was announced the eleventh volume would bring its climax. The manga finished in Dessert on May 23, 2020. After the ending, the series was given a side-story chapter.

At Anime NYC 2017, Kodansha USA announced they licensed the series digitally. During a live stream on March 25, 2021, they announced a print release for the series.

==== Volume list ====
No.	Original release date	Original ISBN	English release date	English ISBN
1	November 13, 2015	978-4-06-365844-6	November 28, 2017 (digital); January 11, 2022 (print)	978-1-64-212022-6
2	April 13, 2016	978-4-06-365861-3	January 9, 2018 (digital); February 8, 2022 (print)	978-1-64-212023-3
3	September 13, 2016	978-4-06-365878-1	February 6, 2018 (digital); April 5, 2022 (print)	978-1-64-212119-3
4	February 13, 2017	978-4-06-365893-4	March 13, 2018 (digital); June 7, 2022 (print)	978-1-64-212166-7
5	September 13, 2017	978-4-06-365922-1	April 10, 2018 (digital); August 30, 2022 (print)	978-1-64-212187-2
6	March 13, 2018	978-4-06-511116-1	August 14, 2018 (digital); October 11, 2022 (print)	978-1-64-212394-4
7	August 9, 2018	978-4-06-512516-8	January 8, 2019 (digital); December 13, 2022 (print)	978-1-64-212611-2
8	January 11, 2019	978-4-06-514206-6	April 30, 2019 (digital); February 7, 2023 (print)	978-1-64-212816-1
9	June 13, 2019	978-4-06-516037-4	September 24, 2019 (digital); April 9, 2023 (print)	978-1-64-659034-6
10	November 13, 2019	978-4-06-517610-8	February 18, 2020 (digital); June 6, 2023 (print)	978-1-64-659240-1
11	May 13, 2020	978-4-06-519415-7	September 29, 2020 (digital); August 8, 2023 (print)	978-1-64-659715-4
12	October 13, 2020	978-4-06-520975-2	February 16, 2021 (digital); October 3, 2023 (print)	978-1-64-659964-6

=== Drama CDs ===
A drama CD was released alongside the eleventh volume. It featured acting from Ari Ozawa, Nobuhiko Okamoto, Saori Ōnishi, Kazuyuki Okitsu, and Yusuke Shirai. Another drama CD was made to coincide with the release of the final volume. It featured the same cast as the previous drama CD.

=== Live-action film ===
A live-action film adaptation was announced on December 6, 2023. The film is directed by Miki Kōichirō, with scripts by Satoko Okazaki and stars Ryubi Miyase and Nanoka Hara as Akira Ohmi and Eriko Ichimura respectively. The film premiered in Japanese theaters on March 15, 2024.

=== Reception ===
The series was nominated for the Kodansha Manga Award in the shōjo category in 2018. A member of the Bessatsu Friend and Dessert editorial team picked the series as their favorite shōjo manga in 2018.

Michelle Smith from Soliloquy in Blue praised the first three volumes for the characters and unique plot, stating that they "really enjoyed" them.

== See also ==
- Love, That's an Understatement, another manga series by the same author
