= Lisa Takeba =

Japanese film director and screenwriter (born 1983)

- Born: 1983 (age 41–42); Japan
- Occupation(s): Film director Screenwriter

Lisa Takeba (竹葉リサ, Takeba Risa) is a Japanese film director and screenwriter.

== Life and career ==
Lisa Takeba was born in Japan in 1983. She has worked in several media, writing a screenplay for a game for the Nintendo DS, writing novels for mobile devices, and beginning in 2009 she also wrote and directed a number of short films.

Takeba's first feature film as a director and writer was the quirky romantic comedy The Pinkie which debuted at the International Film Festival Rotterdam in January 2014 where it was nominated for the NETPAC Award (for the best Asian feature film). Takeba traveled to Rotterdam for the film's presentation and in an interview there, she said that Akio Jissoji was a definite influence on her filmmaking. The Pinkie was also screened at the Yubari International Fantastic Film Festival in February 2014, where it won the Grand Prize and the Cinegar Award in the Off Theater Competition.

Her second feature film, Haruko's Paranormal Laboratory, about a television coming to life, also had its world premier at the International Film Festival Rotterdam, debuting in January 2015 in the Tiger Awards competition. This new film, written and directed by Takeba was partially funded from her Grand Prize winnings at Yubari in 2014 for The Pinkie. Haruko’s Paranormal Laboratory was also presented at the February 2015 Yubari Festival.

== Filmography (director) ==
- Summer Bookmobile (Natsu no idoutoshokan) (July 2010) [short]
- The World's Most Beautiful Dictionary (2011) [short]
- Wandering Alien Detective Robin (さすらいのエイリアン 私立探偵ロビン, Sasurai no eirian shiritsu tantei Robin) (2012) [short]
- The Pinkie (さまよう小指, Samayou Koyubi) (September 2014)
- Haruko's Paranormal Laboratory (春子超常現象研究所, Haruko Chojo Gensho Kenkyujo) (January 2015)
- Horse Thieves (2019)
- Signal 100 (2019)
