= Mystery Bonita =

Japanese manga magazine

- Cover of the May 2016 issue (featuring Children of the Whales by Abi Umeda)
- Categories: Shōjo manga
- Frequency: Monthly
- First issue: May 1988
- Company: Akita Shoten
- Country: Japan
- Based in: Tokyo
- Language: Japanese
- Website: www.akitashoten.co.jp/bonita

Mystery Bonita (Japanese: (ミステリーボニータ, Hepburn: Misutarī Bonīta)) is a monthly Japanese shōjo magazine published by Akita Shoten on the sixth of each month. It was originally launched as a spin-off to the magazine Bonita, which was later merged with Mystery Bonita in 1996. Mystery Bonita was initially envisioned to serialize darker serials compared to its parent magazine, featuring horror and mystery works. After the merge the magazine continued to have a focus on publishing mystery and supernatural stories.

The magazine is known for publishing series from a variety of genres, as in addition to the prior genres it also publishes fantasy, historical, action, romance, and non-romance works.

== Serializations ==
=== Current ===
- Crystal Dragon by Yuuho Ashiba (1996–hiatus)
- Bride of Deimos: Sai Shūshō by Etsuki Ikeda and Yuuho Ashiba (2007–hiatus)
- Köln Shikei Odo by Yasuko Aoike (2018–present)
- Musashi #9: Ghost & Gray by Miyuki Takahashi (2020–present)
- Mirage of Blaze R by Mizuna Kuwabara and Shouko Hamada (2020–present)
- Nishi Ogikubo Mitsuboshi Yōshudō by Sai Asai (2020–present)
- Mahoroba no Bannin by Chika Shiomi (2022–present)
- Kuchikake Ryū no Keiyakusha by Wataru Midori (2022–present)
- Itsuka Shinu nara E o Utte kara by Parari (2022–present)
- A Witch's Life in Mongol by Tomato Soup (2025–present)
- Afureko Booth no Kimi-tachi e by Ryoko Chiba (2025–present)

=== Finished ===
1990s

- Musashi #9 by Miyuki Takahashi (1999–2007)
- Key Jack by Chika Shiomi (1999)

2000s

- Genju no Seiza by Matsuri Akino (2000–2007)
- Lady Midnight by Shinji Wada (2001–2002)
- Tales of Yajikita College by Ryōko Shitō (2003–2006)
- Miyori no Mori by Hideji Oda (2004–2008)
- Kugutsushi Rin by Shinji Wada (2006–2011)
- Musashi #9: Mission Blue by Miyuki Takahashi (2007–2010)

2010s

- Musashi #9: Red Scramble by Miyuki Takahashi (2010–2014)
- Key Jack: Teenage Edition by Chika Shiomi (2011)
- Ku - Neuntöte by Satoru Yuiga (2013–2015)
- Children of the Whales by Abi Umeda (2013–2023)
- The House in Fata Morgana: The Veil Over Your Eyes by Keika Hanada and Kanemune (2014–2017)
- Musashi #9: Silent Black by Miyuki Takahashi (2015–2019)
- Key Jack: Deadlock by Chika Shiomi (2016)
- Kimi o Shinasenai Tame no Storia by Toriko Gin (2016–2021)
- Key Jack: Keep Alive by Chika Shiomi (2018–2020)

2020s

- Yameru Hoshi yori Ai o Komete by Honda (2020–2025)
- The Credits Roll into the Sea by John Tarachine (2020–2025)
- Kowloon Sōsa Kaikiroku by Natsumegu Seiju (2020–2021)
