= Hideji =

- Gender: Male

Origin
- Origin: Japanese
- Meaning: Different meanings depending on the kanji used

Hideji (written: 秀治, 秀司 or ひで次) is a masculine Japanese given name. Notable people with the name include:

- Hideji Hōjō (北条 秀司; 1902–1996), Japanese writer and playwright
- Hideji Katō (加藤 秀司; born 1948), Japanese baseball player
- Hideji Oda (小田 ひで次; born 1962), Japanese manga artist
- Hideji Ōtaki (大滝 秀治; 1925–2012), Japanese actor
