= Kimi o Shinasenai Tame no Storia =

Japanese manga series

- Second tankōbon volume cover

きみを死なせないための物語
- Genre: Science fiction
- Manga
- Written by: Toriko Gin
- Published by: Akita Shoten
- Imprint: Princess Comics Bonita
- Magazine: Mystery Bonita
- Original run: October 6, 2016 – September 4, 2020
- Volumes: 8
- Manga

Side story
- Written by: Toriko Gin
- Published by: Akita Shoten
- Imprint: Princess Comics
- Magazine: Mystery Bonita
- Original run: January 6, 2021 – June 5, 2021
- Volumes: 1

Kimi o Shinasenai Tame no Storia (きみを死なせないための物語(ストーリア); "Story for the Sake of Keeping You Alive") is a Japanese manga series written and illustrated by Toriko Gin. It was serialized in Akita Shoten's shōjo manga magazine Mystery Bonita from October 2016 to September 2020. The series' chapters were collected in eight tankōbon volumes.

In 2021, the manga won the 52nd Seiun Award for Best Comic.

== Synopsis ==
The series is set in a space habitat named Cocoon, and is centered around Arata, Tara, Caesar, and Rui who are a new type of human species known as "neoteny", and live under constant surveillance. One day, their lives change when they come into contact with an unknown green-haired girl in the undetected entertainment district

== Publication ==
Written and illustrated by Toriko Gin, Kimi wo Shinasenai Tame no Storia was serialized in Akita Shoten's shōjo manga magazine Mystery Bonita from October 6, 2016, to September 4, 2020. Its chapters were collected in eight tankōbon volumes from April 2017 to October 2020.

A side story spin-off manga was serialized in the same magazine from January 6 to June 5, 2021. Its chapters were collected in a single tankōbon volume that was released as the ninth volume of the series.

| No. | Release date | ISBN |
|---|---|---|
| 1 | April 14, 2017 | 978-4-253-26401-3 |
| 2 | October 16, 2017 | 978-4-253-26402-0 |
| 3 | March 16, 2018 | 978-4-253-26403-7 |
| 4 | October 16, 2018 | 978-4-253-26404-4 |
| 5 | April 16, 2019 | 978-4-253-26405-1 |
| 6 | October 16, 2019 | 978-4-253-26406-8 |
| 7 | May 15, 2020 | 978-4-253-26407-5 |
| 8 | December 16, 2020 | 978-4-253-26408-2 |
| 9 | August 16, 2021 | 978-4-253-26409-9 |

== Reception ==
In 2017, the series was ranked 7th in the 2018 edition of Takarajimasha's Kono Manga ga Sugoi! guidebook for the best manga for female readers. In 2021, the series, along with Hozuki's Coolheadedness, won the 52nd Seiun Award for the Best Comic.
