= Bright: Samurai Soul =

Japanese anime film

- Official release poster

Japanese name
- Kanji: ブライト：サムライソウル
Transcriptions
- Revised Hepburn: Buraito: Samuraisouru
- Directed by: Kyōhei Ishiguro
- Written by: Michiko Yokote
- Starring: Yūki Nomura; Daisuke Hirakawa; Shion Wakayama; Miyavi; Maaya Sakamoto; Kenjiro Tsuda; Chafurin; Mamoru Miyano; Kenichi Suzumura
- Music by: Lite
- Production company: Arect
- Distributed by: Netflix
- Release date: October 12, 2021
- Running time: 80 minutes
- Countries: Japan; United States
- Languages: Japanese; English

Bright: Samurai Soul (Japanese: ブライト：サムライソウル, Hepburn: Buraito: Samuraisouru) is a 2021 adult animated action film directed by Kyōhei Ishiguro and written by Michiko Yokote. It serves as a spin-off of Bright (2017). The film stars the voices of Yūki Nomura, Daisuke Hirakawa, Shion Wakayama, Miyavi, Maaya Sakamoto, Kenjiro Tsuda, Chafurin, Mamoru Miyano, and Kenichi Suzumura while the English dub consists of Simu Liu, Fred Mancuso, Yuzu Harada, Matt Yang King, Victoria Grace, Keone Young, and Paul Nakauchi. The film was released by Netflix on October 12, 2021.

== Plot ==
In 1868 at Edo Castle, Izou fights to protect Shogun Yoshinobu Tokugawa from the New Government Army, but the battle stops when a spell from an elf named Bright illuminates the area. Years later, Izou works as a brothel guard and is told to lock up a rowdy elf girl. She demands freedom, but he refuses. Later, Izou visits High Courtesan Chihaya, delivering items, and she notices his injured hand, which he downplays. They visit the troublesome elf girl, Sonya, and Chihaya shows interest in having her as an attendant.

Chihaya feeds Sonya, who reveals she is from Russia and has a bird with her. Izou overhears and leaves, but soon two warriors murder his superior outside. Chihaya, also known as the Forgetful, explains she lost her memory during the Meiji Restoration and shows Sonya a map of Hakodate, an elven land across the sea. Suddenly, their brothel is attacked by an army of Orcs, Goblins, and Dwarves, killing many. Izou retrieves his katana and begins fighting back. The leader of the attackers, along with his Orc friend Raiden, promises freedom to Raiden if he finds the elf girl.

Chihaya hides Sonya as a man barges in wanting to buy her, prompting their escape. Meanwhile, Izou fights the invaders and is soon attacked by Raiden. Flaming arrows rain down, and Chihaya returns to Sonya, who is unconscious from smoke. Sonya awakens and reveals her elf nature by biting the leader's hand, leading to her capture attempt. Chihaya tries to help but is stabbed by the leader. Before dying, she asks Sonya to take her hairpin to Hakodate and casts a spell illuminating Edo Castle, halting the fight between Izou and Raiden.

Raiden finds Sonya by Chihaya's body, and although she is surrounded by a dissipating light barrier, Izou arrives, fights Raiden, and then picks up Sonya. Raiden, who knows Sonya's name, helps them escape. Later, Raiden is tied up while Izou buries Chihaya. Sonya offers to hire Izou with Chihaya's hairpin, and Raiden disavows his previous employer for hunting elves. They flee to an inn, but they are soon ambushed by the leader of the invaders.

Izou is injured, recalling Kōketsu's betrayal that caused him to lose an eye. In the chaos, Raiden nearly gets killed but is saved by his old boss. They refuse to surrender Sonya, and in the fight, they flee to a cliff, facing more danger. They fall into the river below. In a cave, an old centaur, Tsukuyomi, finds them and gives them their weapons back while mentioning Sonya's fate is unknown. He leads them upward while discussing the hunt for magical Wands by two factions.

Tsukuyomi sends Izou and Raiden on a quest to find Sonya, who is revealed to be alive. Eventually, they reach Yokohama, where they help an injured boy and meet Chihaya's twin sister, who explains that Chihaya's hairpin is a magical wand. They set off to locate Sonya, who has been taken by Kōketsu. In a confrontation at the Inferni estate, Kōketsu kills Izou, but Sonya revives him using the wand. They then vaporize Kōketsu, and Izou ultimately throws the wand into the ocean, believing that humans should solve their own issues.

== Cast ==
Character	Language	
Character	Japanese	English
Izou	Yūki Nomura	Simu Liu
Raiden	Daisuke Hirakawa	Fred Mancuso
Sonya	Shion Wakayama	Yuzu Harada
Kōketsu	Miyavi	Matt Yang King
Chihaya	Maaya Sakamoto	Victoria Grace
Tōmoku	Kenjiro Tsuda	
Tsukuyomi	Chafurin	Keone Young
Rōshu	Mamoru Miyano	
Ōkubo	Kenichi Suzumura	Paul Nakauchi

== Production ==
Netflix first announced the project as part of their Geeked Week in June 2021. Kyōhei Ishiguro was announced as the film's director from a script by Michiko Yokote and with character designs by Atsushi Yamagata. Arect served as the animation studio. In September 2021, the cast of the film was revealed to star Yūki Nomura (in his voice acting debut), Daisuke Hirakawa, and Shion Wakayama; and shortly afterward, Simu Liu, Fred Mancuso, and Yuzu Harada were announced to be voicing the English dub. Miyavi also starred in the film, making his voice actor debut. The film is animated using 3D computer graphics with art in the style of Japanese woodblock prints.

== Reception ==
On the review aggregator website Rotten Tomatoes, 40% of 5 critics' reviews are positive, with an average rating of 6.20/10.
