= Nizo Yamamoto =

Japanese art director (1953–2023)

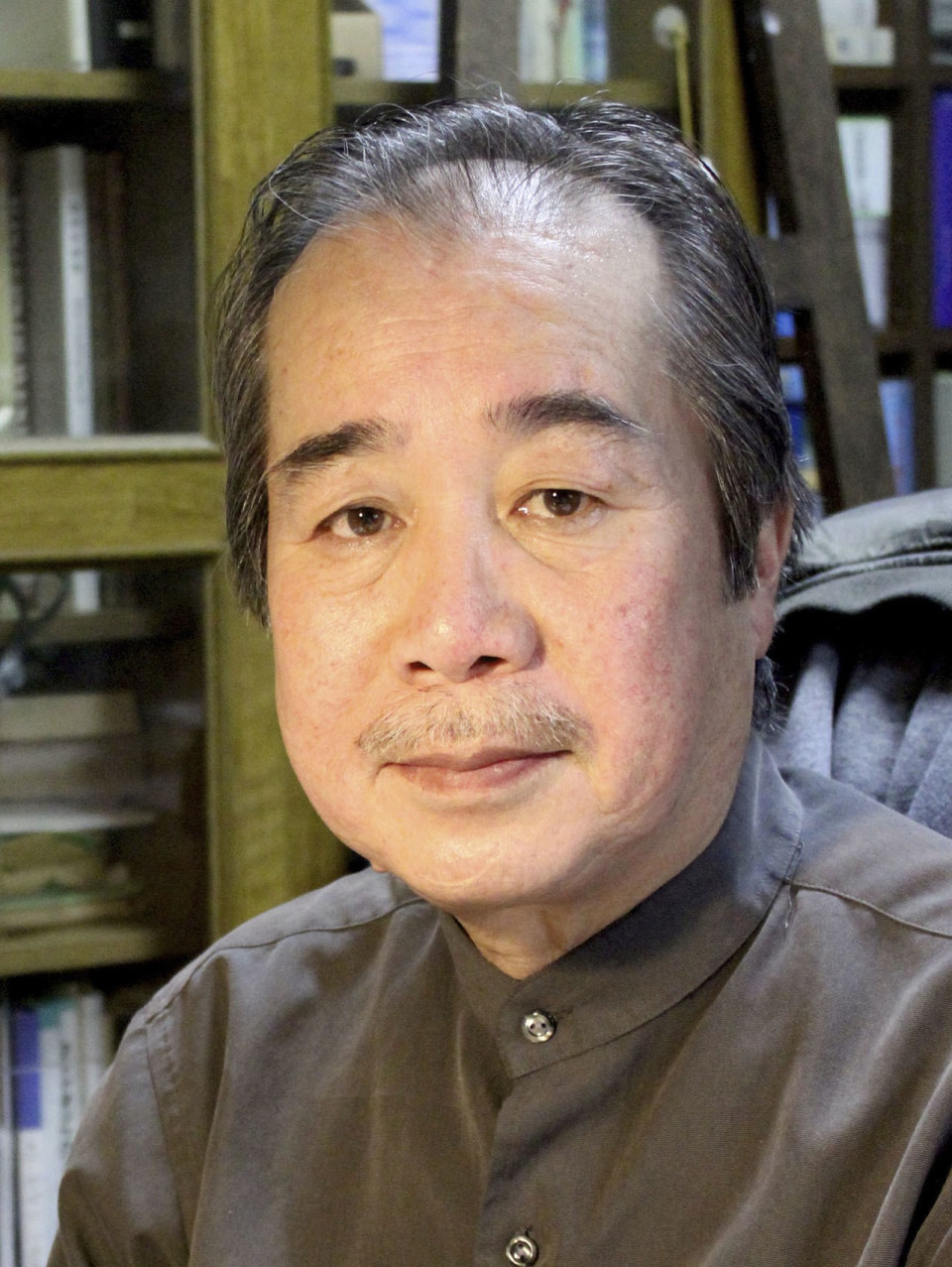

Nizo Yamamoto (山本 二三, Yamamoto Nizō), 27 June 1953 – 19 August 2023) was a Japanese art director. He began his career working on Future Boy Conan, but also worked on numerous films, most notably Studio Ghibli films such as Castle in the Sky, Grave of the Fireflies, Princess Mononoke, and Spirited Away. Additionally, he worked on Mamoru Hosoda's film The Girl Who Leapt Through Time and Makoto Shinkai's film Weathering with You. He died of stomach cancer on 19 August 2023, at the age of 70.

== Works ==
=== Director ===
- Onigiri Kororin - (おにぎりころりん), 1991
- Miyori no Mori - (ミヨリの森), 2007
- Tenjo Taifu - (天上大風～わたしが出遇った良寛さま～), 2017

=== Art director ===
- Future Boy Conan - (未来少年コナン), 1978
- Jarinko Chie - (じゃりン子チエ), 1981
- Sherlock Hound - (名探偵ホームズ), 1984
- Castle in the Sky - (天空の城ラピュタ), 1986
- Grave of the Fireflies - (火垂るの墓), 1988
- Little Nemo: Adventures in Slumberland - (NEMO ニモ), 1989
- Fujiko F Fujio no SF Tanpen Theater Ep.1 - (藤子F不二雄SF短編シアター「宇宙船製造法」), 1990
- Ojisan Kaizou Kouza - (おじさん改造講座), 1990
- Onigiri Kororin - (おにぎりころりん), 1991
- Dōgen Sama - (道元さま), 1992
- The Wolf and the Seven Young Goats - (おおかみと7ひきのこやぎ), 1993
- Tōi Umi kara Kita Coo - (遠い海から来たCOO), 1993
- Tobira wo Akete - (トビラを開けて), 1995
- Princess Mononoke - (もののけ姫), 1997
- Clover - (CLOVER), 1999
- Yocchan no Biidama - (よっちゃんのビー玉), 1999
- Fantastic Children - (ファンタジックチルドレン), 2004
- The Girl Who Leapt Through Time - (時をかける少女), 2006
- Kawa no Hikari - (川の光), 2009
- The Bears'School Jackie & Keity - (くまのがっこう ジャッキーとケイティ), 2010

=== Assistant background art director ===
- Monarch: The Big Bear of Tallac - (シートン動物記 くまの子ジャッキー), 1977
- Bannertail: The Story of Gray Squirrel - (シートン動物記 りすのバナー), 1979

=== Background art ===
- Anne of Green Gables - (赤毛のアン), 1979
- Lupin the 3rd Part II - (ルパン三世 TV第2シリーズ), 1980
- Phoenix 2772 - (火の鳥2772 愛のコスモゾーン), 1980
- Sanshiro Sugata - (姿三四郎), 1981
- Adieu Galaxy Express 999 - (さよなら銀河鉄道999 アンドロメダ終着駅), 1981
- Haguregumo - (浮浪雲), 1982
- The Golden Bird - (グリム童話 金の鳥), 1987
- The Story of Yanagawa's Canals - (柳川堀割物語), 1987
- Robot Carnival - (ロボットカーニバル), 1987
- Goku: Midnight Eye II - (MIDNIGHT EYE ゴクウ II), 1989
- Cyber City Oedo 808 - (電脳都市OEDO808), 1990
- A Wind Named Amnesia - (風の名はアムネジア), 1990
- Soreike! Anpanman: Baikinman no Gyakushuu - (それいけ!アンパンマン ばいきんまんの逆襲), 1990
- Only Yesterday - (おもひでぽろぽろ), 1991
- Legend of Crystania – The Motion Picture - (はじまりの冒険者たち レジェンド・オブ・クリスタニア), 1995
- Anne no Nikki - (アンネの日記), 1995
- Whisper of the Heart - (耳をすませば), 1995
- Memories: Magnetic Rose - (MEMORIES Episode.1「彼女の想いで」), 1995
- Spriggan - (スプリガン), 1998
- Perfect Blue - (パーフェクトブルー), 1998
- Spirited Away - (千と千尋の神隠し), 2001
- A Tree of Palme - (パルムの樹), 2002
- Nitaboh - (NITABOH 仁太坊-津軽三味線始祖外聞), 2004
- Arashi no Yoru ni - (あらしのよるに), 2005
- Fullmetal Alchemist the Movie: Conqueror of Shamballa - (劇場版 鋼の錬金術師 シャンバラを征く者), 2005
- Highlander: The Search for Vengeance, 2007
- Porphy no Nagai Tabi - (ポルフィの長い旅), 2008
- Mai Mai Miracle - (マイマイ新子と千年の魔法), 2009
- Welcome to the Space Show - (宇宙ショーへようこそ), 2010
- Je t'aime - (Je t'aime), 2010
- Rainbow Fireflies - (虹色ほたる 〜永遠の夏休み〜), 2012
- The Life of Budori Gusuko - (グスコーブドリの伝記), 2012
- Weathering with You - (天気の子), 2019

=== Art books ===
- Nizou Yamamoto Works from Film (山本二三画集 フィルムからの言葉). Kadokawa Shoten, 1993. ISBN 978-4048524629
- The Background Art Of Yamamoto Nizo (山本二三背景画集). Kosaido Publishing, 2012. ISBN 978-4331516010
- Yamamoto Nizo Landscape Painting (山本二三 風景を描く). Bijutsu Shuppan, 2013. ISBN 978-4568389050
- 100 Views Yamamoto Nizo (山本二三百景 新装版). EI Publishing, 2019. ISBN 978-4777954452
