= Children of the Whales =

Japanese manga series

- First volume cover

クジラの子らは砂上に歌う (Kujira no Kora wa Sajō ni Utau)
- Genre: Dystopian; Post-apocalyptic; Science fantasy
- Manga
- Written by: Abi Umeda
- Published by: Akita Shoten
- English publisher: NA: Viz Media
- Magazine: Monthly Mystery Bonita
- Original run: June 6, 2013 – January 6, 2023
- Volumes: 23
- Anime television series
- Directed by: Kyōhei Ishiguro
- Produced by: Tomomi Kyōtani; Haruka Kazuya; Natsuki Uetake; Miyuki Yamada; Yuki Takamura; Shūhei Nantan
- Written by: Michiko Yokote; Kyōhei Ishiguro
- Music by: Hiroaki Tsutsumi
- Studio: J.C.Staff
- Licensed by: Netflix
- Original network: Tokyo MX, SUN, KBS, BS11
- Original run: October 8, 2017 – December 24, 2017
- Episodes: 12
- Manga

Kujira no Kora wa Sajō ni Manabu!
- Written by: Abi Umeda
- Published by: Akita Shoten
- Magazine: Monthly Mystery Bonita
- Original run: April 2018 – June 2021
- icon

Children of the Whales (Japanese: クジラの子らは砂上に歌う, Hepburn: Kujira no Kora wa Sajō ni Utau; lit. "Whale Calves Sing on the Sand") is a Japanese manga series written and illustrated by Abi Umeda. It serialized in Akita Shoten's Shojo manga magazine Mystery Bonita from 2013 to 2023. The manga is licensed in North America by Viz Media. An anime television series adaptation produced by J.C. Staff aired in Japan from October to December 2017, and was released globally on Netflix in March 2018.

== Synopsis ==
The story focuses on a boy called Chakuro, who lives on a giant vessel called a Mud Whale that drifts over the sea of sand. In the Mud Whale, society is divided into two kinds of people: the Marked, who can move objects with their minds using a strange power called "thymia", at the expense of shortened lifespans, and the Unmarked, people who lack thymia but enjoy longer lifespans. Chakuro and his friends have never seen anyone from the outside world, and they spend their days yearning to explore and learn about it. In year 93 of the vessel's exile, the Mud Whale encounters a lonely island and Chakuro finds a girl inside, starting an adventure that changes the lives of everyone.

== Characters ==
Chakuro (チャクロ)
Voiced by: Natsuki Hanae (Japanese); Johnny Yong Bosch (English)
The protagonist and narrator of the story. Chakuro is a Marked boy who works as an archivist for the Elders in the Mud Whale hoping that his records will improve life for future generations. Curious and gentled he sometimes dreams to see the world outside the Mud Whale and immediately befriends Lykos after finding her on the abandoned island.
Lykos (リコス, Rikosu)
Voiced by: Manaka Iwami (Japanese); Melissa Fahn (English)
A mysterious girl found on an island that was about to be scavenged by the Mud Whale's people for resources. "Lykos" is not really her name, it actually refers to a mysterious creature that feeds off the emotions of anyone that comes near it. Chakuro simply calls her "Lykos" for the sake of convenience. She is at first reluctant to speak to anyone, but with Chakuro's help she learns to express herself more openly. It is revealed that she is an Apathetia, a thymia user that offers its emotions to a Nous and the younger sister of Orca, a high ranking member of the Allied Empire. She chooses to stay on the Mud Whale and teaches them how to fight.
Ouni (オウニ)
Voiced by: Yūichirō Umehara (Japanese); Todd Haberkorn (English)
A Marked boy who is said to possess the greatest potential for thymia in the Mud Whale. He is the leader of the Moles, a group of young people who gained their name because they often break the rules of the Mud Whale and thus spent a lot of time imprisoned in the belly of the ship. Obsessed with leaving the Mud Whale, Ouni has earned a reputation as a troublemaker. When Lykos is found by Chakuro, Ouni sees the opportunity to escape the Mud Whale. During the second invasion by the Allied Empire, he sneaks onto enemy ship with Chakuro, Nibi, Lykos, and Ginshu. After seeing Nibi die, he awakens an unknown power that allows him to use thymia in the belly of Skyros and subsequently destroys it. It is suspected that he is a Daimonas, a thymia user with the ability to destroy Nouses.
Suoh (スオウ, Suō)
Voiced by: Nobunaga Shimazaki (Japanese); Bryce Papenbrook (English)
An Unmarked man who worked as an assistant for the Council of Elders and was researching a way to extend the life of the Marked. He is Chakuro's friend and Sami's elder brother, he often gives them advice for how they can help the Mud Whale's people. He often clasps his hands, which Chakuro notes is his way to suppress his emotions. He was appointed Mayor of the Mud Whale after the initial invasion by Skyros and told to sink the ship. After refusing he was thrown into jail.
Ginshu (ギンシュ)
Voiced by: Mikako Komatsu (Japanese); Reba Buhr (English)
A girl who often helps in the everyday activities of the Mud Whale's people, as a member of the Vigilante Corps. She is energetic and calls Chakuro "Chakky."
Liontari (リョダリ, Ryodari)
Voiced by: Daiki Yamashita (Japanese); Griffin Burns (English)
An Apatheia of the Allied Empire who stands out for his excessive emotions. He is sadistic and takes pleasure in killing the citizens of the Mud Whale due to their capacity for emotion. During the invasion he was defeated by Shaun, but managed to escape back to the Empire.
Shuan (シュアン)
Voiced by: Hiroshi Kamiya (Japanese); Douglas Cavum (English)
A mysterious man and the former leader of the Vigilante Corps. He follows Suoh and other Unmarked members of the Mud Whale.
Sami (サミ)
Voiced by: Hisako Kanemoto (Japanese); Christine Marie Cabanos (English)
Chakuro's friend and Suō's younger sister. She seems to harbor feelings for Chakuro and becomes mildly jealous of Lykos upon seeing how close she and Chakuro become. When a mysterious group of soldiers attack the Mud Whale, she shields Chakuro from their bullets and dies. She returns as a spirit, kisses, and confesses her feelings to Chakuro before disappearing.
Kicha (キチャ)
Voiced by: Ayaka Asai (Japanese); Cristina Vee (English)
A girl, member of the Moles.
Taisha (タイシャ)
Voiced by: Anne Yatco (English)
An Unmarked woman and former mayor of the Mud Whale.

== Media ==
=== Manga ===
Abi Umeda launched the series in the July 2013 issue of Akita Shoten's shōjo manga magazine Monthly Mystery Bonita on June 6, 2013. The series has been collected into 23 volumes as of March 2023. The series ended serialization on January 6, 2023. Viz Media announced during their panel at Anime Boston 2017 that they have licensed the manga.

A comedy spin-off manga series was serialized in Monthly Mystery Bonita magazine from April 2018 to June 5, 2021.

No.	Original release date	Original ISBN	English release date	English ISBN
1	December 16, 2013	978-4-253-26101-2	November 21, 2017	978-1-4215-9721-8
2	April 16, 2014	978-4-253-26102-9	January 16, 2018	978-1-4215-9722-5
3	September 16, 2014	978-4-253-26103-6	March 20, 2018	978-1-4215-9723-2
4	February 16, 2015	978-4-253-26104-3	May 15, 2018	978-1-4215-9724-9
5	July 16, 2015	978-4-253-26105-0	July 17, 2018	978-1-4215-9725-6
6	December 16, 2015	978-4-253-26106-7	September 18, 2018	978-1-4215-9727-0
7	April 15, 2016	978-4-253-26107-4	November 20, 2018	978-1-4215-9728-7
8	October 14, 2016	978-4-253-26108-1	January 15, 2019	978-1-4215-9729-4
9	March 16, 2017	978-4-253-26379-5	March 19, 2019	978-1-4215-9730-0
10	September 15, 2017	978-4-253-26380-1	May 21, 2019	978-1-9747-0369-2
11	January 16, 2018	978-4-253-26381-8	July 16, 2019	978-1-9747-0370-8
12	June 14, 2018	978-4-253-26382-5	September 17, 2019	978-1-9747-0705-8
13	October 16, 2018	978-4-253-26383-2	November 19, 2019	978-1-9747-0883-3
14	March 14, 2019	978-4-253-26384-9	January 21, 2020	978-1-9747-1079-9
15	August 19, 2019	978-4-253-26385-6	July 21, 2020	978-1-9747-1486-5
16	March 16, 2020	978-4-253-26386-3	January 19, 2021	978-1-9747-1983-9
17	June 16, 2020	978-4-253-26387-0	July 20, 2021	978-1-9747-2111-5
18	November 16, 2020	978-4-253-26388-7	November 16, 2021	978-1-9747-2459-8
19	April 16, 2021	978-4-253-26389-4	March 15, 2022	978-1-9747-2852-7
20	September 16, 2021	978-4-253-26390-0	October 18, 2022	978-1-9747-3246-3
21	February 16, 2022	978-4-253-26391-7	March 21, 2023	978-1-9747-3610-2
22	August 16, 2022	978-4-253-26392-4	August 15, 2023	978-1-9747-3886-1
23	March 16, 2023	978-4-253-26393-1	February 20, 2024	978-1-9747-4359-9

=== Anime ===
An anime adaptation of the series was announced in the February 2017 issue of Mystery Bonita on January 6, 2017. The anime adaptation, which was later confirmed to be a television series, is directed by Kyōhei Ishiguro and written by Michiko Yokote, with animation by J.C.Staff, character designs by Haruko Iizuka and music by Hiroaki Tsutsumi. It aired from October 8 to December 24, 2017, on Tokyo MX and other channels. It ran for 12 episodes and will have two OVA. It was released globally by Netflix in March 2018. The opening theme song "Sono Saki e" (その未来へ) is performed by singer-songwriter RIRIKO, while the ending theme song "Hashitairo" (ハシタイロ) is performed by rionos.

No.	Title (Note: All English titles are taken from Netflix.)	Original release date
1	"It was Our Entire World"; Transliteration: "Watashitachi no daiji na sekai no subete datta" (Japanese: 私たちの大事な世界の全てだった)	October 8, 2017
2	"Sinners of Falaina"; Transliteration: "Kujira (Farena) no tsumibitotachi" (Japanese: 鯨(ファレナ)の罪人たち)	October 15, 2017
3	"I've Had Enough Of This World"; Transliteration: "Konna sekai wa, mō dō demo ii" (Japanese: こんな世界は、もうどうでもいい)	October 22, 2017
4	"Let's Suicide In The Sand With The Mud Whale"; Transliteration: "Dorokujira to tomo ni suna ni mesareru no da yo" (Japanese: 泥クジラと共に砂に召されるのだよ)	October 29, 2017
5	"I Don't Want to Run"; Transliteration: "Nigeru no wa iyada" (Japanese: 逃げるのはイヤだ)	November 5, 2017
6	"Tomorrow, I Might End Up Having To Kill Someone"; Transliteration: "Ashita, hito o koroshi te shimau kamo shire nai" (Japanese: 明日、人を殺してしまうかもしれない)	November 12, 2017
7	"I Want To See Your Future"; Transliteration: "Omae tachi no mirai ga mitai" (Japanese: お前たちの未来が見たい)	November 19, 2017
8	"Disappear From This World"; Transliteration: "Konoyo kara kie te shimae" (Japanese: この世から消えてしまえ)	November 26, 2017
9	"I Want To See Where Your Choice Leads"; Transliteration: "Kimi no sentaku no, sono saki ga mitai" (Japanese: 君の選択の、その先が見たい)	December 3, 2017
10	"I'm Setting Off On A New Journey"; Transliteration: "Atarashī tabi ni deruwa" (Japanese: 新しい旅に出るわ)	December 10, 2017
11	"It's Just A Dream"; Transliteration: "Yume no Hanashi da" (Japanese: 夢の話だ)	December 17, 2017
12	"I'm Glad I Was Born Here"; Transliteration: "Koko ni umarete yokatta" (Japanese: ここに生まれてよかった)	December 24, 2017
