= The Credits Roll into the Sea =

Japanese manga series

- Cover of the first volume, featuring Umiko Chino

海が走るエンドロール (Umi ga Hashiru Endorōru)
- Manga
- Written by: John Tarachine
- Published by: Akita Shoten
- English publisher: NA: Dark Horse Comics
- Imprint: Princess Comics Bonita
- Magazine: Mystery Bonita
- Original run: October 6, 2020 – November 6, 2025
- Volumes: 9
- Anime film
- Directed by: Taichi Ishidate
- Studio: Kyoto Animation
- Released: 2027
- icon

The Credits Roll into the Sea (Japanese: 海が走るエンドロール, Hepburn: Umi ga Hashiru Endorōru; 'The Seas Roll on the End Credits') is a Japanese manga series written and illustrated by John Tarachine. It was serialized in Akita Shoten's Mystery Bonita magazine from October 2020 to November 2025, with its individual chapters collected into nine volumes. An anime film adaptation produced by Kyoto Animation is set to be released in 2027.

== Plot ==
Umiko Chino, an elderly woman in mourning for her husband, visits the movie theater for the first time in years and meets Kai, a young man who studies filmmaking at an art school. Both soon notice their tendency to observe the audience's reaction to a film rather than the film itself, prompting Kai to challenge Umiko on seeking her own desires. Inspired by Kai's drive, Umiko enrolls at the art school, where she witnesses and struggles to understand the aspirations of a much younger generation of students. Umiko questions on what type of experience is valued, and she seeks for change within this new environment through filmmaking.

== Media ==
=== Manga ===
Written and illustrated by John Tarachine, the series was serialized in Akita Shoten's Mystery Bonita magazine from October 6, 2020, to November 6, 2025. A spin-off chapter was published in the same magazine in January 2026. Its individual chapters were collected into nine tankōbon volumes.

At Anime NYC 2025, Dark Horse Comics announced that they licensed the series for English publication.

==== Volumes ====
No.	Original release date	Original ISBN	English release date	English ISBN
1	August 16, 2021	978-4-25-326521-8	July 7, 2026	978-1-5067-5213-6
2	February 16, 2022	978-4-25-326522-5	October 6, 2026	978-1-5067-5214-3
3	July 14, 2022	978-4-25-326523-2	—	—
4	February 16, 2023	978-4-25-326524-9	—	—
5	August 16, 2023	978-4-25-326525-6	—	—
6	March 14, 2024	978-4-25-326526-3	—	—
7	November 15, 2024	978-4-25-326527-0	—	—
8	July 16, 2025	978-4-253-26528-7	—	—
9	May 15, 2026	978-4-253-01328-4	—	—

=== Anime film ===
An anime film adaptation was announced in May 2026. It will be produced by Kyoto Animation and directed by Taichi Ishidate. The film is set to be released in Japan by Shochiku in 2027.

== Reception ==
In the 2022 edition of the Kono Manga ga Sugoi! guidebook's list of the best manga for female readers, the series ranked first; it ranked sixth on the 2023 edition's list. It was nominated for the 10th Manga Taishō in 2022. The manga was nominated for the 27th Tezuka Osamu Cultural Prize in 2023; it was also nominated for the 29th edition in 2025. It ranked 28th on Da Vinci's 2023 Book of the Year list.

By July 2025, the series had over 1 million copies in circulation.
