= Miyori no Mori =

Japanese manga series

- The cover of Miyori no Mori

ミヨリの森
- Genre: Supernatural, slice of life
- Manga
- Written by: Hideji Oda
- Published by: Akita Shoten
- Magazine: Mystery Bonita
- Original run: April 2003 – November 2003
- Volumes: 1
- Manga

Miyori no Mori no Shiki
- Written by: Hideji Oda
- Published by: Akita Shoten
- Magazine: Mystery Bonita
- Original run: 2007 – 2008
- Volumes: 2
- Anime film
- Directed by: Nizo Yamamoto
- Produced by: Nippon Animation, Fuji TV
- Written by: Satoko Okudera
- Music by: Takefumi Haketa
- Studio: Nippon Animation
- Released: August 25, 2007
- Runtime: 107 minutes
- Manga

Zoku Miyori no Mori no Shiki
- Written by: Hideji Oda
- Published by: Akita Shoten
- Magazine: Mystery Bonita
- Published: 2008

Miyori no Mori (ミヨリの森; "Miyori's Forest") is a 2003 manga series by Hideji Oda and a 2007 anime television film based on it. Two manga sequels, Miyori no Mori no Shiki (ミヨリの森の四季; "The Four Seasons in Miyori's Forest") and Zoku Miyori no Mori no Shiki (続・ミヨリの森の四季; "The Four Seasons in Miyori's Forest: Sequel") were published in 2007 and 2008.

== Anime ==
A TV movie was produced by Nippon Animation and aired on the Fuji TV network on August 25, 2007. It was the directorial debut of Nizo Yamamoto, known for his art direction on a number of Studio Ghibli films, as well as The Girl Who Leapt Through Time. Besides helming the project, Yamamoto also was the art director, and drew storyboards. The film reunited Yamamoto with The Girl Who Leapt Through Time's screenwriter Satoko Okudera. Yū Aoi starred in the film as the titular character. Miyori no Mori had a budget of ¥210 million ($1.7 million), unusually high for a television movie.

== Plot ==
The movie begins with a flashback, from when Miyori is a baby. While on a family visit to her grandparents in Komori Village, she goes missing while her mother and father fight over being so far away from the city. The whole family searches while her grandparents dog, Kuro (meaning black) follows a trail to a massive cherry tree only to find baby Miyori playing with a bear cub. When the dog barks the bear suddenly grows to a massive size and roars, causing Kuro to turn completely white. In the meantime, a myriad of forest spirits appear; and in particular the spirit of the cherry tree (who resembles a heavenly maiden) picks Miyori up and tells her that it is her forest. We find out afterward that her parents found her in that tree and got her down.

The story then jumps ten years in the future. Miyori has become a moody, cynical ten-year-old. Her mother has recently left the family and her father is taking her to live with her grandparents as he feels he cannot take care of Miyori and work at the same time. Miyori considers herself a modern city girl from Tokyo and so resents being abandoned in the boonies. Although her grandparents are very nice, Miyori is dour and generally standoffish. Almost immediately though, strange things start to happen. On a walk she sees a massive tiger and finds her way to the old cherry tree, which was snapped in half in a bad storm in the last year. Falling asleep, she has a bad dream about her past (in the movie it's about her parents marriage failing and being bullied; while in the manga she has a sort of film noir dream about shooting her parents with a gun). The dream is consumed by a friendly forest spirit (Moguri). As more and more spirits introduce themselves to an incredulous, but increasingly surprised Miyori; she also finds out her grandmother is considered a wise woman (although also called a witch) by the locals and is considered the current human guardian of the forest.

Miyori starts school but has difficulty adjusting as she has no idea how to deal with the mix of younger and same age children who are much more sincere and direct than her Tokyo classmates; she also runs afoul of Daisuke, the class clown/bully. Her frustration grows as the forest spirits continue to pester her, and in an attempt to be left alone, finds a fresh spring that's haunted by the ghost of a woman who committed suicide. The ghost shows Miyori that a dam will soon be built, submerging everything. Miyori then uses that information to taunt Daisuke, who insists on going to the spring to find out for himself. However, Daisuke does not return and feeling guilty, Miyori goes to look for him. She finds him in the clutches of the ghost with a demon form (who hates men) and the two of them fight. During this fight, Miyori faces up to the fact that she has been blaming others for her situation and chooses to start moving forward again. This revelation allows her to exorcise the ghost (which was possessing a stoat) and save Daisuke. The two become friends; and Miyori resolves to take her job as guardian seriously and try to prevent the dam from being built.

People from the dam project show up and start "scouting the area", looking for an endangered species of eagle. They explain that if the species is found then the dam cannot be built as the land would then be eligible to become a preserve. Miyori and the other children, thinking it will help; try to find them first, but Miyori realizes soon that they will need more help. To make matters more complicated, Miyori's mother suddenly shows up because she's lonely(in the manga she shows up with her new beau who is unstable and kidnaps Miyori briefly. She escapes unharmed with help from the spirits). Miyori's mom offers to take her back to Tokyo so they can live together. Miyori is not very interested in this offer as she knows her mother's habits and general selfish character. During the night, Miyori calls a meeting of the spirits to ask them for help finding the eagles, but none of them have any idea how to find them. On a suggestion, she turns to the spirit of the wind (Fukurin) for help, and he in turn agrees to ask any eagles he comes across to consider living in the forest. The next day, Miyori's mom heads home but not before repeating her offer; which Miyori turns down saying that unless her mother gets back together with her father, she won't consider it. Her mother agrees to at least talk to her father (while in the manga she's much less sympathetic and says since Miyori is her daughter, she won't be able to survive in the country).

Worried that the eagles will not move to the forest before it's too late, one of the spirits (Bokuriko) shapeshifts to appear as an eagle, only for him (and the children) to discover that the dam people are actually looking to kill the eagles and thus smooth the way for the dam to be built. Bokuriko escapes, but is injured. He is healed thanks to the spirit of the cherry tree. Miyori is given a greater understanding of her and the forest's place in the world and vows to protect it, even if she must sacrifice herself. She then gathers a great number of spirits together and they agree to help her chase the dam people away.

The following day, many, many more hunters show up to try and hunt down the "injured eagle". Miyori and the spirits scare the living daylights out of them while the other village children prevent them from escaping after they are chased from the forest. Soon after the police arrive to take them into custody and Daisuke and the others get a glimpse of Miyori riding one of the forest spirits. A month later things have calmed down and the local paper reports that a family of eagles has likely moved into the area, thus ending the dam's chance of being built. Miyori joyously tells all the spirits that they are safe and reaffirms her desire to stay and continue to protect the forest. The movie ends with Miyori in the cherry tree, which is recovering and will bloom the next year.

The later volumes of manga continue to follow Miyori's exploits in the village and the forest.

== Cast ==
Character	Japanese Voice actor	English voice actor
Miyori	Yū Aoi	
Sakura tree Spirit	Chitose Hajime	
Granny	Etsuko Ichihara	
Negojii	Masaaki Tsukada	
Grandpa	Shinpachi Tsuji	
Daisuke	Yūsuke Numata	
Bokuriko	Aya Takashima	
Kanoko	Hiroyuki Amano	
Mrs. Kōko	Kyōko Sasaki	
Washirashi	Midori Matsuo	
Miyori's Mother	Noriko Yoshizaki	
Miyori's Baby	Satomi Kōrogi	
Fūkūrin	Takashi Nagasako	
Miyori's Father	Toshihito Ito	
