= Kamen Tantei =

Japanese manga series

- Cover of the first Japanese volume

仮面探偵
- Genre: Mystery
- Manga
- Written by: Matsuri Akino
- Published by: Akita Shoten
- English publisher: Tokyopop
- Original run: 1999 – 2000
- Volumes: 4

Kamen Tantei (仮面探偵; lit. 'Masked Detective') is a mystery manga by Matsuri Akino that was published by Akita Shoten and licensed by Tokyopop.

The first volume contains the following Chapters:

- A Detective Appears
- Who Did It?
- Too Many Detectives
- A Dangerous Date
- (Extra) Invitation to the Mystery Novel Club

== Reception ==
"This is fun, and it may be some of the best mystery comics geared at the teenage audience." – Leroy Douresseaux, Comic Book Bin. "It seems to be written as a love letter to the classic mystery novel, but the execution is so over the map that it's hard to pin down exactly what Akino's trying to do here." – Greg Hackmann, Mania. "Following the hallmarks of Japanese mystery, the story in Kamen Tantei features convoluted murder schemes and a puzzle-solving aspect that'd be considered old-fashoned in English-language novels." – Kevin Gifford, Newtype USA. "I highly recommend this series as it has a lot of Akino-sensei's trademark humor." – Lori Henderson, Manga Life.
