= Lance N' Masques =

Japanese light novel and anime series

- First light novel volume cover

ランス・アンド・マスクス (Ransu Ando Masukusu)
- Genre: Action, Fantasy
- Light novel
- Written by: Hideaki Koyasu
- Illustrated by: Shino
- Published by: Pony Canyon
- Imprint: PoniCan Books Light Novel Series
- Original run: December 3, 2013 – August 17, 2018
- Volumes: 9
- Manga

Lance N'Masques -inside PLUS-
- Written by: SakiRyo
- Published by: Pony Canyon
- Magazine: Pony Manga
- Original run: June 2014 – September 2015
- Volumes: 1
- Anime television series
- Directed by: Kyōhei Ishiguro
- Produced by: Atsushi Aitani; Takao Aoki; Jun Fukuda; Shigeki Hosoda; Yoshinori Kusumi; Gō Tanaka; Masato Mukōda
- Written by: Hideaki Koyasu
- Music by: Hiroaki Tsutsumi; Hideakira Kimura
- Studio: Studio Gokumi
- Licensed by: NA: Ponycan USA
- Original network: TBS, BS-TBS, CBC, Sun TV
- Original run: October 1, 2015 – December 17, 2015
- Episodes: 12

Lance N' Masques (Japanese: ランス・アンド・マスクス, Hepburn: Ransu Ando Masukusu) is a Japanese light novel series written by Hideaki Koyasu with illustrations by Shino. Pony Canyon has published the series in nine volumes from 2013 to 2018 under their Poni Can imprint. An anime television series adaptation by Studio Gokumi aired from October 1 to December 17, 2015.

== Plot ==
The protagonist of the story is Yōtarō Hanabusa, a member of the surviving 21st century Knights, called the "Knights of the world." Wanting to be a normal person rather than a knight, he leaves everyone behind to set out on his own, but old habits die hard and he finds that like it or not he reflexively acts like a "White Knight" any time someone's in trouble. One day he meets a girl, Kidoin Makio, and learns that she is forced to live completely alone; he takes her under his wing and begins to look after her, all the while hiding his identity as the masked "Knight Lancer" she idolizes.

== Characters ==
Yōtarō Hanabusa (花房 葉太郎, Hanabusa Yōtarō)
Voiced by: Daiki Yamashita
The male protagonist. One of the last remaining knights in the twenty-first century, he has been trained to fight for justice and behave in a "chivalrous" manner that is far removed from normal modern behavior, to such an extent that some individuals have called him strange or even "perverse". This behavior even ruined his friendship with a girl years ago, and since then he has wanted nothing more than to be a normal person. However, his "white knight syndrome" has been so deeply ingrained that he cannot help reverting to old habits when someone is in danger. Out of embarrassment, he wears a mask to hide his identity whenever he does this. After he learns that Makio lives alone and is not allowed to have any relationships, he decides to stay with her and protect her.
Makio Kidōin (鬼堂院 真緒, Kidōin Makio)
Voiced by: Ari Ozawa
The female protagonist. Daughter of a prominent family, she lives alone and Yōtarō watches over her. She loves the idea of "heroes" who fight for justice and never bow for anyone. For some time she has wanted to be a hero herself and trains every day. One day, when she falls while training, Yotaro, in disguise, saves her. Ever since she has adored her "Knight Lancer", but does not realize that "pathetic" Yōtarō is the same person. After some time, she decides that rather than becoming a hero, she will instead become a great "Lady" whom Knight Lancer can be proud to protect.
Yoriko Sudō (朱藤 依子, Sudō Yoriko)
Voiced by: Manami Numakura
A maid and Yōtarō's stern mentor. Her iron fist has guided his training since childhood, to the point that he blames her for his "White Knight Syndrome".
Alice Cleveland (アリス・クリ―ヴランド, Arisu Kurivurando)
Voiced by: Suzuko Mimori
A bright and cheerful knight apprentice who serves as Yōtarō's squire.
Shirohime (白姫)
Voiced by: Ayaka Suwa
A horse that squeals like a pig that was bred and raised to be Yōtarō's steed.
Yuifa/Liu Yu-Hua (リュウ・ユイファ)
Voiced by: M.A.O
Makio's personal maid and the only one to stay at the mansion with her long-term. She was once an orphan taken in by the criminal organization "Ban" where she used her hacking skills to commit a variety of crimes. After the knight Gai destroyed Ban, she and the other orphans grew up under his care.
Sae Igarashi (五十嵐 冴, Igarashi Sae)
Voiced by: Yumiri Hanamori
Yōtarō's classmate and friend. She considers Yōtarō to be a very kind, gentle and dependable boy, and frequently is shown quite close to him; that said, she considers such things as wearing masks and kissing girls' hands to be perverted, and even called Yōtarō a pervert when he saved her before joining her school. After he saves her again and she learns his identity and the reasons for his mask, she forgives him but asks that he stop doing "perverted" things.
Tafei
Voiced by: Mami Koyama
An older female knight who's acquainted with Kongouji and Yōtarō's father. Officially, she serves as Knight Leader of East Asian Sector.
Shin Hanabusa (花房 森, Hanabusa Shin)
Voiced by: Akira Ishida
Yōtarō's father, a legendary knight, and Yuma Kidoin's knight.
Yuma Kidoin
Voiced by: Unknown
Makio's mother. Shin Hanabusa's princess whom he failed to protect.
Gai Kongouji (金剛寺 鎧, Kongouji Gai)
Voiced by: Takashi Matsuyama
An older knight who serves and protects Makio's father. Years ago, he personally destroyed the criminal organization Ban, and took in all the numerous orphans they'd kidnapped and trained to commit crimes for them. The children alternately call him their "Boss" or their "father".

== Media ==
=== Light novels ===
No.	Release date	ISBN
1	December 3, 2013	978-4-86529-009-7
2	May 3, 2014	978-4-86529-027-1
3	October 3, 2014	978-4-86529-099-8
4	March 3, 2015	978-4-86529-116-2
5	October 3, 2015	978-4-86529-153-7
6	December 3, 2015	978-4-86529-170-4
7	December 17, 2016	978-4-86529-253-4
8	June 17, 2018	978-4-86529-291-6
9	August 17, 2018	978-4-86529-293-0

=== Anime ===
An anime television series adaptation aired from October 1 to December 17, 2015. Kyōhei Ishiguro directed the series at Studio Gokumi, and original author Hideaki Koyasu was in charge of the scripts. The opening theme is "Light for Knight" by Suzuko Mimori and the ending theme is "Little*Lion*Heart" by Ayana Taketatsu.

==== Episodes ====
No.	Title	Original release date
1	"He's a Real Hero"; Transliteration: "Honmono no Hīrō na noda" (Japanese: 本物の騎士(ヒーロー)なのだ)	October 1, 2015
Trained from a young age to defend the honor of those in trouble, Yōtarō Hanabusa is appointed as a member of the Knights of the World. He yearns for a life away from knighthood but his body reacts to a lady's scream that he must come to her rescue, what he dubs as "White Knight Syndrome". Yōtarō comes across Makio Kidōin, the daughter of a wealthy family that he rescues from a fall of a cliff and is taken into her mansion after being found starving outside. He learns that Makio lives alone in the mansion except for one of her maids Liu Yuhua, and has a fascination for heroes especially for Yōtarō who saved her in disguise that she dubs "Knight Lancer". Yōtarō dons the persona after three men in suits attempt to kidnap Makio. Knight-in-training and Yōtarō's squire Alice Cleveland, his steed Shirohime, and his maid and mentor Yoriko Sudō find him at the Kidōin mansion.
2	"Are You Prepared"; Transliteration: "Sono Kakugo ga Aru no Ka" (Japanese: その覚悟があるのか)	October 8, 2015
Worried for Makio's well being, Yōtarō decides to stay with her a little longer to protect her from any incoming danger. After seeing her attempt to climb a rock cliff and proclaiming that Knight Lancer will come to rescue her, he scolds Makio in that Knight Lancer wouldn't want a lady who constantly puts herself into trouble. Yōtarō visits the Kidōin Company building to talk with Makio's father but instead meets with Gai Kongouji, a third high-ranking member of the Throne Knights. After learning that Makio is being sent overseas by her father and that the men in suits from before are part of the criminal organization Ban, Yōtarō attempts to leave but Gai stops him and get into a fight that involves Yōtarō's lance being broken. Returning to the Kidōin mansion, he finds Alice knocked out and Makio missing.
3	"I Am Here Now, My Lady"; Transliteration: "Omataseshimashita, Redi" (Japanese: お待たせしました、レディ)	October 15, 2015
Arriving at the Kidōin mansion Yōtarō reads Makio's letter to Knight Lancer, thanking him for saving her from before and opening her eyes to a real hero. He also learns from Liu that the criminal organization Ban is led by Gai and her brother Yuyan was responsible for taking Makio from her house. Yōtarō, Yoriko and Shirohime arrive at the airport to fend off Yuyan and rescue Makio, with help from Liu's hacking skills. Yōtarō's father Shin, sends him a coffin containing his lance Rhongomyniad, and is able to defeat Gai in a duel by destroying his lance. Makio's father Akira and Shin converse about how Makio should be able to live in Japan without trouble, while also hinting at Shin's previous failure to save her mother and Akira's wife Yuma. The next morning, Makio wears a frilly red dress and denounces her attempts at being a hero, and instead proclaims that she will be a great lady for Knight Lancer to both rescue and be married to.
4	"Daddy"; Transliteration: "Pāpa" (Japanese: パーパ)	October 22, 2015
After it was decided that Makio would remain in Japan, her father Akira sent her to Shinra Academy to take elementary school classes, with Yōtarō, Alice and Yuhua taking high school classes to keep an eye on her. He converses with a student in his class that he saved from before, Sae Igarashi, who despises Knight Lancer and his valiant efforts she deems as perverted. Yōtarō also comes across Sylvia Marlowe, his senior knight who takes him and Sae to an abandoned building where Makio and everyone else use as space for the Knight Club created by Nori Hizuki, a third-year student who taught Makio the concept of heroes. Yuyan, wanting revenge for what happened to Gai, comes across Yufeng, a girl formally part of the Ban organization and tells her about how Knight Lancer is responsible for their organization's demise. Yōtarō senses danger on his way home to school and dons the Knight Lancer persona to rescue Yufeng being harassed by members of Ban. After taking them down, he's in shock when she hugs him and calls him her father.
5	"From Now On, We're Family"; Transliteration: "Kyō Kara Kazoku Desu!" (Japanese: 今日から家族です！)	October 29, 2015
Sylvia explains to Yōtarō that Yufeng was the reason she's in Japan and the person she's looking for. He asks to assist in the search and Sylvia accepts as she goes off to find her. Back at the Kidōin mansion, Yōtarō receives a call from Yuyan using Sae's cellphone, and hears that he has kidnapped her. He arrives at the meeting place and asks Yuyan to let her go. After shooting at him, Yufeng destroys Yuyan's guns and chases after him, with Yōtarō following suit after freeing Sae from her restraints. Sylvia meets up with Yuyan and is stabbed in the thigh by Yufeng to protect him. After being told that her shifu was murdered by Yuyan, she attempts to kill him but instead punctures Yōtarō in the abdomen. Heartbroken by the action, Yufeng runs off and encounters Yoriko, resulting in a fight that sends her off a cliff. Yōtarō saves her and gets into a duel with Yoriko that ends in a stalemate. Makio comes across Yufeng and brings her to the mansion as her and Knight Lancer's daughter.
6	"Just This Once"; Transliteration: "Kyō dake wa tokubetsudakara ne!" (Japanese: 今日だけは特別だからね！)	November 5, 2015
Wanting to help Yufeng get close to everyone, Makio has Yōtarō and the gang go to a hot spring at Shinogi Inn. Her timid behavior and constant need to atone for her actions causes Yōtarō to don his Knight Lancer persona and comfort her by having a family bonding moment in the hot springs. Sae learns from Yōtarō that this was the place that saw him lose a childhood friend because of his knighthood.
7	"Be Mine"; Transliteration: "Ore no mono ni nare yo" (Japanese: オレのものになれよ)	November 12, 2015
Yōtarō and Yuyan get abducted by the Four Gods, knights sworn loyalty to Chief Sun Dafei of the World Knights' East Asia branch, and taken back to his hometown of Penglai Island. Yoriko and Sylvia head to Penglai to bring them back, with Alice put in charge to watch over Makio. Also desperate to see them return home, Makio, Yufeng, Alice, Shirohime and Yuhua follow suit to the island.
8	"Give Me Courage"; Transliteration: "Yūki o kudasai" (Japanese: 勇気をください)	November 19, 2015
Makio and the others arrive in the town of Penglai Island and reunite with Yuyan but come across the Four Gods. Each one is confronted by a knight by donning the personas that Makio gave them: Yufeng as Shadow Saber against Hanna, Sylvia as Silver Lancer against Ming, Alice as Sunny Lancer against Gil-Ha, and Yoriko as Rose Lancer confronting Chief Dafei. Dorgon, leader of the Four Gods, searches for Yufeng but comes across Makio looking for Yōtarō.
9	"Charge"; Transliteration: "Totsugeki" (Japanese: 突撃)	November 26, 2015
As each one of the Four Gods gets defeated by Makio's family, The duel between Yoriko and Chief Dafei ends with the latter being taken down. Dorgon arrives to see his chief seemingly dead and confronts Yoriko about her actions. Yōtarō stands in his way to protect her.
10	"Be Who You Want to Be"; Transliteration: "Naritai jibun ni nare" (Japanese: なりたい自分になれ)	December 3, 2015
Yōtarō and Dorgon fight each other after the Yoriko-Chief Dafei duel that goes back forth with both knights fairly even in strength. Yōtarō seemingly has the upper hand until Makio sees him with disdain and is about to be killed, but only for Dafei to take Dorgon's attack instead and collapses from exhaustion. Dorgon apologizes for his actions and says that he will atone for them. Gil-Ha meets with Yōtarō's father Shin, who's disappointed with how his battle turned out, and warns him to lie low for awhile. Dafei promotes Yōtarō the rank of Arch Knight as an apology to Yoriko after the whole ordeal. Back at the Kidōin mansion, Makio talks with Alice about Yōtarō being Knight Lancer after seeing him in battle. A ship container travelling the desert holds the World Knights' Africa branch, making a plan of attack.
11	"Knighthood"; Transliteration: "Kishi michi" (Japanese: 騎士道)	December 10, 2015
Following the Penglai Island incident, Yōtarō returns to his ordinary life in Japan by heading back to school with Makio and his friends, with Yufeng and Yuyan also applied to the same school as them. Alice dons her Sunny Lancer persona in order to keep Makio from thinking that Yōtarō is Knight Lancer, only for her to be upstaged by Yufeng in her Shadow Saber persona. During training at the Knight Club, Makio's suspicion of Yōtarō causes her to run back home, and is met by Shin who kidnaps her. As the group search for her and get abducted by the Africa branch of the World Knights, Yōtarō is confronted by their chief Wadjet Raja, who extends an invitation for him to join their side. He refuses and has to battle the Per-Wadjet who've taken his friends, losing his mask in the process and being soundly defeated. As Wadjet mentally coerces him to join the Africa branch, Shin arrives to stop her.
12	"That's Why I am a Knight"; Transliteration: "Sore ga boku no kishidearu imina ndesu" (Japanese: それが僕の騎士である意味なんです)	December 17, 2015
Shin dispatches with the Per-Wadjet and sends Wadjet running off, later confronting Yōtarō to fight him. He refuses to face his father and Yoriko arrives to hold him off while they run away, just as he mentally scars his son by telling her that his training methods would have broken him if he had been under his tutelage. Outside on the container ship, Shin returns with Shirohime's mother Shirotsubaki and challenges Yōtarō to fight him, and get back Makio who's placed in a birdcage. The two square off in a duel, with Shin's lance Rhonogomyniad starting to cause Yōtarō's to slowly disappear. Makio tells him that she knew he was Knight Lancer and did not want to believe that because she did not want her hero to leave. Inspired by her words, Yōtarō regains his soul and his lance reappears to defeat Shin, with Makio's mother Yuma appearing to him as he's reminded of their time together. The next day, Dafei and Gai visit Yoriko in the hospital, only to spot Shin attempting train his son again in his own way, with Yoriko having faith that he'll be alright. Yōtarō prepares to return home to resume his knight training and brings Makio along with him because of the oath that Knight Lancer gave to protect her.

== Reception ==
The anime adaptation's first episode received poor reviews from Anime News Network's staff during the Fall 2015 season previews. Rebecca Silverman was optimistic of both the Maiko plotline and world-building involving the knights but found negative qualities in the overall production and introduction of the supporting cast. Other staffers were less than favorable. Lynzee Loveridge was critical of the faulty logic and lack of "normalcy" in the plotting, while Nick Creamer called it "flavorless anime custard" for being an "extremely bland light novel adaptation." Theron Martin compared the plot to Kure-nai but with production that is well below its quality level. Hope Chapman criticized the story for playing out like an amalgam of "subpar 4-koma anime" with comedy that comes across more like "pure filler than intentional humor." Zac Bertschy saw the introduction of the premise as "barebones" with characters that offer nothing to get the viewer interested in them.
