= Musashi Number 9 =

Japanese manga series

- Musashi #9

9番目のムサシ (Kyūbanme no Musashi)
- Genre: Adventure, Action, Military
- Manga
- Written by: Miyuki Takahashi
- Published by: Akita Shoten
- English publisher: NA: CMX Manga
- Magazine: Kirara 16 (1996–1999); Mystery Bonita (1999–2007)
- Original run: April 1996 – March 2007
- Volumes: 21

Musashi #9 (9番目のムサシ, Kyūbanme no Musashi) is a Japanese manga series by Miyuki Takahashi about a secret agent working for a mysterious world organization known only as "Ultimate Blue". #9 is their one of their top agents, a 16-year-old girl who goes by the code name "Musashi #9". Her aliases include Shinozuka Kou and Shinosaki Kei. The series starts as a collection of unconnected stories which feature #9 but focus mainly on the more ordinary people she comes into contact with in the course of saving the world. Gradually, a thread is woven between these one-shot stories, in which Kou strikes up a relationship with the solitary and depressive Shingo Tachibana. Their lives become irrevocably intertwined in spite of her fairly drastic efforts (for his sake) to leave him behind. The series is relatively graphic with clear depictions of Musashi's activities, such as fighting and killing off bad guys.

== Plot ==
At the 2nd book Kou's new mission is to protect Shingo Tachibana. Shingo's best friend was a photographer and accidentally took a picture of a sniper shooting someone from the top of a building. His best friend was murdered, but never revealed where the picture was hidden. Lonton (the sniper working for the Chinese Triads who'd killed Shingo's best friend) is now after Shingo, thinking he knows where the picture is located. In the end Shingo and Kou take out Lonton and he is sent to prison.

Kou stays with Shingo for the next few books, and not soon after Shingo begins to fall in love with Kou. Kou tries to remain emotionless and focus on the mission at hand, to protect Shingo), but she too is falling for him. Shingo goes through a lot trying to tell Kou he loves her; the first time her told her was when a car had just hit him and he was dazed. She heard him, but instead pretended that it was her double and that in his daze he couldn't recognize the difference between 19 (her male double) and her. She pretend she never heard, and Shingo remains quiet about it, thinking of a better way to tell her.

== Arc - Mission 5 ==
=== Mission Summary ===
At this point in time, there is a large ship dressed up as an ordinary cargo ship within the middle of Tokyo Bay. At the top of this hidden ship are four large tomahawk missiles which are pointed at Greater Tokyo. The FF armed terrorist organization is behind this whole issue. If the FF leaders are given back to this organization—in which they are currently captured—the terrorist organization will not need to launch its missiles to destroy the greater portion of Tokyo. Such an action is forced because the FF terrorists are also equipped with hostages; if the CIA refuses to move, the missiles will automatically be fired and many shall be killed. Thus, the organization needs its members released within the time span of 24 hours. Due to the severity of this issue, the Prime Minister has assigned for Musashi to effectively stop this scheme as a member of Ultimate Blue—the most secret of organizations.

=== Musashi's Arrival ===
When Musashi finally arrives after the time span of four hours, she assumes the role of a random kid who supposedly heard from her friend to meet her at the school—the main area in which the terrorists are keeping the 24 children hostage and Musashi. Upon arrival Musashi is assumed to be a girl, and is placed in an alternate room away from the others.

=== Conclusion ===
After Musashi was effectively taken away and all of the hostages were set in a single group, the leader of the terrorists effectively saw through the false cover of a secret agent who had posed as a captured coach. After the leader then ordered the death of this undercover agent as to avoid a sudden unwanted conclusion, they set fire to their weapons to destroy this nuisance. Suddenly, these blows would be effectively evaded and Musashi would show her true self—a feared member of Ultimate Blue. By secretly replacing the terrorist's weapons with fakes, Musashi gains the upper hand and wins. The terrorist leader, however, presses the command button to release the set missiles atop their ship. To the immense surprise of the leader and everyone around Musashi, the ship is destroyed by an Ultimate Blue space satellite as it releases its destructive beam when the missiles are activated. Thus, the leader's plan was brought to its true conclusion and Ultimate Blue elaborated its hidden prowess once again.

== Sequels ==
Following the end of the original manga, several sequel serializations have been released. The sequels are as follows:

- Musashi #9: Mission Blue (9番目のムサシ ミッション・ブルー) from 2007 to 2010.
- Musashi #9: Red Scramble (9番目のムサシ レッドスクランブル) from 2010 to 2014.
- Musashi #9: Silent Black (9番目のムサシ サイレント ブラック) from 2015 to 2019.
- Musashi #9: Ghost & Gray (9番目のムサシ ゴースト アンド グレイ) from 2020 to present.
