= Words Bubble Up Like Soda Pop =

2020 Japanese animated film by Kyōhei Ishiguro

- Theatrical release poster

Japanese name
- Kanji: サイダーのように言葉が湧き上がる
Transcriptions
- Revised Hepburn: Saidā no Yō ni Kotoba ga Wakiagaru
- Directed by: Kyōhei Ishiguro
- Written by: Kyōhei Ishiguro; Dai Satō
- Produced by: Yoshimoto Ishikawa; Hiroyuki Birukawa; Satoshi Fukao; Motoki Mukaichi; Shūzō Kasahara; Atsushi Koishikawa
- Starring: Ichikawa Somegorō; Hana Sugisaki; Megumi Han; Natsuki Hanae; Yūichirō Umehara; Megumi Nakajima
- Cinematography: Kōhei Tanada; Yoshihiro Sekiya
- Music by: Kensuke Ushio
- Production companies: Sublimation; Signal.MD
- Distributed by: Shochiku (Japan); Netflix (international)
- Release dates: July 25, 2020 (Shanghai International Film Festival); July 22, 2021 (worldwide)
- Running time: 87 minutes
- Country: Japan
- Language: Japanese

Words Bubble Up Like Soda Pop (Japanese: サイダーのように言葉が湧き上がる, Hepburn: Saidā no Yō ni Kotoba ga Wakiagaru) is a Japanese animated slice-of-life romantic comedy-drama film produced by Sublimation and Signal.MD and directed by Kyōhei Ishiguro. It premiered at the 2020 Shanghai International Film Festival. It was released to Japanese theaters on July 22, 2021, and on Netflix the same day internationally. Set in a rural part of Japan with a large shopping mall, the film follows two people who have trouble communicating with others. Yui "Cherry" Sakura is a shy boy who can only express himself well through his writing of haiku. Yuki, aka "Smile", covers her mouth with a mask to hide her braces that try to fix her buckteeth and is an online influencer. A fateful meeting at the mall starts a romance between them.

== Plot ==
At the local Oda Nouvelle Mall, Yui "Cherry" Sakura is working at an elderly care center for summer break. Cherry is a quiet and reserved boy who prefers to write haiku to express his feelings but struggles with reciting them in front of an audience. Amidst a chaotic chase between delinquent Beaver and the mall security, Cherry accidentally swaps phones with Smile, an online influencer who wears a face mask to hide her buckteeth. The pair connect online, and eventually start to meet in-person, taking an interest in each other's hobbies.

Smile starts working at the elderly care center and helps in rehearsing the Daruma Folk Song for the upcoming summer festival at the mall. Fujiyama, a vintage record shop owner and regular at the care center, tells Cherry and Smile of his wish to listen to the record "Yamazakura" one more time, of which he only has the album cover. Cherry and Smile decide to help Fujiyama in finding the record and find out that it is a music recording made by Fujiyama's late wife.

Surmising that the record may be hidden somewhere in the shop, Cherry and Smile employ the help of several friends at the mall and scour the entire place, finally finding the record behind a refrigerator. While making preparations to play the record, Smile asks Cherry to watch the fireworks at the summer festival together, and Cherry accepts. However, Smile shortly after shatters the record while attempting to flatten it.

The next day, Cherry and Smile decide to apologize to Fujiyama once more but are sidetracked when it is discovered that Cherry will be moving away on the day of the festival. Disappointed, Smile bids farewell to an ashamed Cherry.

On the day of the festival, Smile presents Fujiyama with a reassembled record as an apology and is shocked to find a working copy repurposed as a wall clock in the elderly care center. Reenergized by this revelation, Smile devises a plan to play the record during the care center's performance at the summer festival. As Cherry's family car drives past the mall, he sees his haiku written about Smile spray painted on the street signs by Beaver. Mustering his courage, Cherry races to the festival and confesses his feelings for Smile in the form of several haikus, some of which were inspired by "Yamazakura". As the fireworks show starts, Smile reciprocates by taking off her mask and revealing her smile.

In the post-credits scene, Cherry and Smile share a kiss while the old record plays.

== Voice cast ==
Character	Japanese voice	English voice
Cherry/Kouichi "Yui" Sakura	Ichikawa Somegorō VIII	Ivan Mok
Smile/Yuki	Hana Sugisaki	Kim Wong
Beaver	Megumi Han	Sam Lavagnino
Japan	Natsuki Hanae	Marcus Toji
Yasuyuki/Toughboy	Yūichirō Umehara	Andrew Kishino
Juri	Megumi Nakajima	Victoria Grace
Mari	Sumire Morohoshi	Yuuki Luna
Akiko Fujiyama	Kōichi Yamadera	Ping Wu
Tsubaki Fujiyama	Kikuko Inoue	Kim Mai Guest
Tanaka	Aya Hisakawa	
Kouchi	Hiroshi Kamiya	
Motopuri	Junichi Yanagita	
Maria	Maaya Sakamoto	
Miyuki	Manami Numakura	
Akiko Matsushita	Minori Suzuki	
Sae	Nanako Mori	
Nami	Shizuka Itō	
Kanta	Yasuaki Takumi	

== Production and release ==
The film was originally announced at FlyingDog's Inu Fes concert. At the concert, it was also announced to be directed by Kyōhei Ishiguro, with animation production by Sublimation and Signal.MD, scripts by Dai Satō, character designs by Yukiko Aikei, and music by Kensuke Ushio. In December 2019, it was announced that it would open in Japanese theaters on May 15, 2020, and would star Ichikawa Somegorō VIII and Hana Sugisaki. In April 2020, it was announced the film would be delayed due to the COVID-19 pandemic. In November 2020, it was announced the film would premiere on June 25, 2021, following the delay. After being delayed again, the film opened in Japanese theaters on July 22, 2021. The film's main theme is "Cider no Yō ni Kotoba ga Wakiagaru" performed by Never Young Beach. The insert song for the film is "Yamazakura", performed by city pop artist Taeko Onuki. Internationally, the film was streamed on Netflix both dubbed and subbed, starting on the same day as the Japanese theatrical release.

=== Manga adaptation ===
A manga adaptation of the film by Imo Ōno started serialization in Monthly Comic Alive on November 27, 2019. It ended on March 27, 2021.

During their panel at New York Comic Con 2022, Yen Press announced that they have licensed both the manga and light novel adaptations.

== Reception ==
=== Critical response ===
On the review aggregator website Rotten Tomatoes, 100% of 6 critics' reviews are positive, with an average rating of 7.6/10.

Kim Morissy from Anime News Network highly praised the film as a "sweet teen rom-com" and the "perfect pick-me-up," commending its "pop-art inspired visuals, relatable characters, and remarkable musical score," while noting that its "reliance on Japanese wordplay may affect translation for foreign audiences." On Decider, John Serba gave it a "Stream It" recommendation, praising its "visually lovely" art style and the quiet, charming way its protagonists work through their insecurities, though he noted that the central teen-romance fodder can feel "rather trite and banal."

Allen Moody of THEM Anime Reviews praised the film as an "extremely good-natured romance", highlighting the charming idiosyncrasies and fascinating quirkiness of the lead characters, though he noted that certain plot points were highly predictable and telegraphed well in advance. Clara V. Nguyen, for The Harvard Crimson, gave it a highly positive review, describing it as a "teen dramedy" that "makes a splash" with its neon-heavy color palette and inventive reinterpretations of romance tropes, while praising how it unites music, poetry, and animation to celebrate everyday art without turning saccharine.

Melvyn Tan of Anime Trending reported that the film "sparkled with charm" despite a "plodding experience" in its middle stretch, praising its bright pop art aesthetic, delightful first half, and an absolutely wonderful finale, though he noted that a heavy subplot left the central romance underdeveloped. Writing for The Indiependent, Alex Daud Briggs said, "Words Bubble Up Like Soda Pop is a warm-hearted love story with two adorable main leads and coated in a vibrant colour palette", calling it a cute and fluffy slice of life that is perfect for a slow day.

=== Accolades ===
In 2020, the film was nominated for the Mainichi Film Award for Best Animation Film. The film was also nominated for Best Film at the 2022 Crunchyroll Anime Awards.
