= Bride of Deimos =

Japanese horror manga series and OVA

- First tankōbon volume cover

悪魔(デイモス)の花嫁 (Deimosu no Hanayome)
- Genre: Dark fantasy; Romance
- Manga
- Written by: Etsuko Ikeda
- Illustrated by: Yuuho Ashibe
- Published by: Akita Shoten
- English publisher: NA: ComicsOne; (expired)
- Imprint: Princess Comics
- Magazine: Princess; Viva Princess
- Original run: December 6, 1974 – 1990
- Volumes: 17
- Original video animation

Deimosu no Hanayome: Ran no Kumikyoku
- Directed by: Rintaro
- Written by: Etsuko Ikeda
- Music by: Yasuo Fukazawa
- Studio: Madhouse
- Released: August 31, 1988
- Runtime: 30 minutes
- Manga

Deimosu no Hanayome: Sai Shūshō
- Written by: Etsuko Ikeda
- Illustrated by: Yuuho Ashibe
- Published by: Akita Shoten
- Imprint: Bonita Comics
- Magazine: Mystery Bonita
- Original run: May 7, 2007 – April 2014 (on hiatus)
- Volumes: 6
- icon

Bride of Deimos (Japanese: 悪魔(デイモス)の花嫁, Hepburn: Deimosu no Hanayome) is a Japanese dark fantasy manga series written by Etsuko Ikeda and illustrated by Yuuho Ashibe. It premiered in Princess magazine in December 1974, later moving to Viva Princess, where it ran until the magazine became defunct with the release of its October 1990 issue. Akita Shoten collected the chapters into 17 compiled volumes published under the Princess Comics imprint; ComicsOne licensed the series for an English-language release in North America and published seven volumes before going out of business. In August 1988, the manga inspired an original video animation (OVA) adaptation directed by Rintaro and produced by Madhouse. In May 2007, Bride of Deimos resumed serialization in Monthly Bonita magazine, with the subtitle "The Final Chapter" (最終章, Sai Shūshō). It was put on hiatus in April 2014, with six compiled volumes published as of May 2014.

== Plot ==
Bride of Deimos revolves around high school girl Minako Ifu, who has become the focus of the attentions of the demon Deimos. Minako appears to be the physical reincarnation of Deimos' lover and younger twin sister, Venus, the former goddess of love. In order to rescue Venus from the fatal punishment she received as a result of their relationship, he has to bring Minako to the underworld so Venus can possess her body. Over the course of the manga, the reader sees the various ways that Deimos attempts to accomplish this, interspersed with random chapters of Deimos involved in bringing suffering and death to whichever humans he happens to encounter.

== Characters ==
=== Main characters ===
Minako Ifu (伊布 美奈子, Ifu Minako)
Voiced by: Mayumi Shō
Minako is the main female protagonist in the series. She is a cheerful, kind, blonde-haired, blue-eyed high school girl. She is considered very beautiful, which often inspires jealousy in other girls and passion or romantic feelings in men, often to the point of obsession. She appears to be the physical reincarnation of the Goddess of Love, Venus, and is therefore the focus of Deimos' desires. She first encounters Deimos in a dream, where he attempts to seduce her, but she looks at his shadow (which reveals he's a demon) and pulls away. Because her nature tends to inspire love and/or jealousy, she is regularly seen as a rival (often unknowingly) by other women. She is usually then victimized in some way through physical abuse or imprisonment, which regularly culminates in an attempt on her life. She also seems to attract supernatural trouble and is prone to possession. She has been taken over (by Venus and others) on multiple occasions. Deimos is usually the one who rescues her from these predicaments, claiming that he is only intent on preserving her for his own purposes. Throughout the series, Minako becomes more subdued and less outgoing due to Deimos' interference and becomes hesitant to become involved in romantic relationships, as Deimos drives away or precipitates the death of most of her suitors. She tolerates Deimos' presence because she knows she cannot get rid of him and engages in futile attempts to stop him from doing evil if she is aware of his machinations. There are some indications she does care for him a little, and struggles with the fact she is attracted to him.
Deimos (デイモス, Deimosu)
Voiced by: Nachi Nozawa
Deimos is considered one of the main antagonists in the story; however, there are several chapters that are devoted to him as the protagonist as well. Deimos used to be a very handsome Greek youth (and presumably also a god, though it is never directly stated in the manga) and the twin brother of Venus, the Goddess of Love. However, the pair had romantic feelings for each other, and when Zeus caught them kissing, they were both struck down by his wrath. When Deimos awoke again, he had been transformed into a devil like creature with horns, large black feathered wings, hairy clawed feet, and pointy ears. In the midst of this shock, Deimos searched for Venus and found her imprisoned and disfigured in the underworld. He vows to rescue her and get revenge on Olympus and the gods. In order to free Venus, though, he has to find a girl who is the living image of Venus, then bring her to Hades so Venus can possess her body. Deimos spends many centuries searching before he finds Minako Ifu, and thus begins to pursue her and try to convince and/or trick her into coming with him to the underworld. Over the course of time though, it appears that Deimos has come to have real affection for Minako, as he tends to rescue her from harm and dangerous situations, and on at least one occasion has actually defended her from Venus. Deimos appears to be torn between his devotion to Venus and his growing love for Minako, though in general he is still more likely to support Venus and try to placate her jealousy. The love triangle is never resolved as the series never finished. When Deimos is not pursuing Minako (and also the time during which he was looking for her) Deimos spends his time traveling around and leaving horror and death in his wake. Rather than taking a direct approach, Deimos usually provides the impetus in the form of suggestions or cursed items to cause people to do bad things, usually in the name of revenge. Though cursed himself, Deimos is still extremely powerful, and can mostly hide his demon form and appear as a human. However, mirrors and his shadow reflect his true nature, showing his wings and horns regardless of his outward appearance. Like his namesake in Greek mythology, he delights in causing terror and misery to humanity and gods alike if he gets the chance.
Venus (ヴィーナス)
Voiced by: Toshiko Fujita
Venus is the Goddess of Love and Deimos' younger twin sister. She looks exactly like Minako with longer hair, and she wears a Greek style dress and a tiara with a large red gem in the center. When caught kissing Deimos, Zeus strikes them both down. Venus dies and is punished by being imprisoned in Hades (which always appears to be underwater). She is hung by thorny vines, upside down from a tree. Her right eye has also been gouged out to ruin her vaunted beauty, thus she tends to keep her hair over her face to hide the empty socket. Venus' spirit can escape for brief periods of time in the form of a white butterfly. She usually will go to Deimos, though on occasion she has been drawn to women in similar situations to herself. She has a great deal of jealousy and hatred toward any woman who attracts Deimos' attention, including Minako. She is also angry with Deimos for his behavior regarding her reincarnation, but she can never quite bring herself to act against him; she will instead reproach him or attempt to harm Minako. There are a couple of chapters that deal with Venus' tools as the Goddess of Love; one in which Minako spends an interlude as Venus and must give her magical belt to Hera (the belt makes anyone who views the wearer fall in love with them) to ruin a woman who had caught the eye of Zeus and one in which Deimos borrows her tiara and uses it to destroy twins whom Zeus has proclaimed the most beautiful in Olympus. He taunts the twins that whoever is the most beautiful may have the tiara and take the position as the Goddess of Love, and the two bicker and fight until one pushes the other into a fire and kills her. The surviving twin goes mad and dances off the edge of a cliff and dies not long afterward.

=== Recurring characters ===
The manga tends to be a series of stand-alone stories that have Deimos' appearance as the only thing in common apart from the chapters that involve Minako. However, there are a couple of characters who make more than one appearance.

Angel
As her name indicates, Angel is a winged emissary from "God" in heaven, sent to collect good souls. Angel appears as a young woman with light fluffy hair and large eyes. In her angelic form she has white feathered wings, a halo, and wears a long, flowing robe. However, Angel's actions and intentions are questionable. She has been seen coming to Earth when she's bored and will make bets with Deimos regarding human nature. She also engineered the death of a good young man so that she could collect his soul when it was at its most beautiful state, even though the man would have lived for many years more.
Death
The anthropomorphic manifestation of Death, he appears as a skeletal reaper in a black, hooded robe. He and Deimos cross paths several times, and Deimos does not interfere with him unless it has something to do with Minako. Death marks her to die at one point, but he only has one day to accomplish reaping her soul and Deimos saves her by outwitting him. Otherwise, Deimos tends to stay out of his way and implies to Minako that even Death has a modicum of power greater than his own.

== Media ==
=== Manga ===
Bride of Deimos was written by Etsuko Ikeda and illustrated by Yuuho Ashibe. It premiered in the January 1975 issue of Akita Shoten's monthly shōjo (girls') manga magazine Princess on December 6, 1974; it ended in the October 1990 issue of Princess's sister magazine Viva Princess, when the magazine itself ceased publication. Akita Shoten collected the chapters into 17 tankōbon volumes published under the Princess Comics imprint from November 1975 to November 1990. The company re-released the series twice: first, in 12 aizōban volumes published under the Princess Comics Deluxe imprint from August 1994 to January 1995, and second, in 12 bunkoban volumes published under the Akita Bunko imprint from July 1996 to September 1997. ComicsOne licensed the series for an English-language release in North America and published seven volumes before going out of business in 2005.

Almost 20 years after its last chapter, Bride of Deimos resumed serialization in the June 2007 issue of Akita Shoten's monthly shōjo manga magazine Mystery Bonita on May 7, 2007. Titled Deimosu no Hanayome: Sai Shūshō (悪魔の花嫁 最終章; "Bride of Deimos: The Final Chapter"), the series was put on hold in April 2014 to allow Ashibe to resume her other long-running manga series, Crystal Dragon. Akita Shoten has published six tankōbon volumes of Sai Shūshō under the Bonita Comics imprint as of May 2014.

=== Original video animation ===
A 30-minute original video animation (OVA) titled Deimosu no Hanayome: Ran no Kumikyoku (悪魔の花嫁～蘭の組曲; "Bride of Deimos: The Orchid Suite") was released in Japan on August 31, 1988. It was produced by Madhouse and directed by Rintaro, with the script written by series author Etsuko Ikeda and the music composed by Yasuo Fukazawa. It was distributed on VHS by Akita Shoten and Toei Video. Adapting a chapter of the manga, Ran no Kumikyoku is centered on a wealthy brother and sister who live in seclusion. The brother raises a special breed of orchid and takes care of his disabled older sister. The pair have a dysfunctional relationship that ends in death for any potential suitors for either of them. Minako ends up in the crossfire of this feud when she visits the mansion and catches the eye of the brother.

== Reception ==
Jason Thompson of Anime News Network described Bride of Deimos as a "funky mixture of gory horror and mythology, of Buddhism, Christianity, and Greek myth", with "enjoyable old-school shojo manga artwork". He further praised the variety of its "absurd but imaginative" episodic tales and its "special 1970s bizarreness", reminiscent of a Mario Bava horror film. In a review of the first volume, Publishers Weekly agreed that the decades-old manga "retains all its power to chill", crediting Ashibe's "use all manner of odd angles and perspective" in her artwork "to convey Minako's off-kilter world ... that veers between ordinary and mystical."
