= Crystal Dragon =

Japanese manga series by Yuuho Ashibe

クリスタル☆ドラゴン (Kurisutaru Doragon)
- Genre: Historical fantasy
- Manga
- Written by: Yuuho Ashibe
- Published by: Akita Shoten
- Imprint: Bonita Comics
- Magazine: Bonita; Mystery Bonita
- Original run: 1981 – present
- Volumes: 30

Crystal Dragon (Japanese: クリスタル☆ドラゴン, Hepburn: Kurisutaru Doragon) is a Japanese historical fantasy manga series written and illustrated by Yuuho Ashibe. Set in Ireland and Roman Britain, the story follows a black-haired girl named Arianrhod and her fight against Balor Evil-Eye, the Gothic warlord who destroyed her home tribe. Joining her in the fight are Henruda, the daughter of a Celtic chieftain, and Legion, the Silver Knight.

== Media ==
=== Manga ===
Crystal Dragon began serialization in Akita Shoten's monthly shōjo (girls') manga magazine Bonita in 1981, later transferring to its sister magazine Mystery Bonita. The series went on hiatus from 2007 to 2014, during which Ashibe resumed her other long-running manga series, Bride of Deimos. It went on hiatus again in summer 2020 due to unspecified circumstances. In April 2021, Ashibe announced that the series is nearing its climax. Akita Shoten has published 30 tankōbon (compiled volumes) of Crystal Dragon under the Bonita Comics imprint as of November 2020; the company also published 12 bunkoban (paperback novel-sized volumes) under the Akita Bunko imprint from July 2003 to July 2007. Internationally, the series is licensed in Indonesia by Elex Media Komputindo.

No.	Release date	ISBN
1	March 10, 1982	978-4-25-309015-5
2	May 30, 1982	978-4-25-309016-2
3	December 5, 1982	978-4-25-309017-9
4	May 30, 1983	978-4-25-309018-6
5	July 5, 1984	978-4-25-309019-3
6	December 1, 1984	978-4-25-309020-9
7	May 5, 1985	978-4-25-309021-6
8	October 1, 1985	978-4-25-309022-3
9	April 1, 1986	978-4-25-309023-0
10	November 10, 1986	978-4-25-309024-7
11	July 1, 1987	978-4-25-309071-1
12	September 5, 1989	978-4-25-309072-8
13	August 5, 1990	978-4-25-309073-5
14	August 25, 1992	978-4-25-309074-2
15	December 25, 1997	978-4-25-309075-9
16	November 15, 1998	978-4-25-309076-6
17	March 10, 2000	978-4-25-309077-3
18	August 25, 2001	978-4-25-309129-9
19	March 20, 2002	978-4-25-309130-5
20	October 25, 2002	978-4-25-309131-2
21	July 20, 2003	978-4-25-309547-1
22	June 25, 2004	978-4-25-309548-8
23	May 15, 2005	978-4-25-309549-5
24	April 15, 2006	978-4-25-309550-1
25	January 15, 2008	978-4-25-326000-8
26	October 25, 2015	978-4-25-326001-5
27	September 25, 2016	978-4-25-326002-2
28	March 25, 2018	978-4-25-326003-9
29	March 25, 2019	978-4-25-326004-6
30	November 25, 2020	978-4-25-326005-3
