= Tales of Yajikita College =

Japanese manga series and OVA

やじきた学園道中記 (Yajikita Gakuen Dōchūki)
- Manga
- Written by: Ryōko Shitō
- Published by: Akita Shoten
- Magazine: Bonita (1982–1991); Mystery Bonita (2003–2006)
- Original run: 1982 – 2006
- Volumes: 29
- Original video animation
- Directed by: Yoshihisa Matsumoto
- Produced by: Hiroshi Tazaki (ep. 1); Kazuhiko Ikeguchi (ep. 1); Hiroyuki Yonemasu (ep. 2); Michihisa Abe (ep. 2)
- Written by: Mami Watanabe
- Music by: Nobuhiko Kashihara
- Studio: J.C.Staff
- Released: September 15, 1989 – July 25, 1991
- Episodes: 2

Tales of Yajikita College (やじきた学園道中記, Yajikita Gakuen Dōchūki; transl. "Yakita Academy Travel Journal") is a manga series by Ryōko Shitō (市東亮子, Shitō Ryōko). The manga was published by Akita Shoten; 29 volumes (1982–1991, Bonita (ボニータ, Bonīta) magazine), 2003–2006, Mystery Bonita (ミステリーボニータ, Misutarī Bonīta) magazine, and compiled into 29 tankōbon volumes.

== Plot ==
The stories follow the adventures of Shinokita Reiko (Kita) and Yajima Junko (Yaji) as they move from school to school fighting corruption, Yakuza, gangs, and ninja. Both Yaji and Kita have extraordinary hand-to-hand fighting skills, which they actually work on improving. Yaji's family runs a dojo and Kita's father is a police captain. The characters are based on the theme in Tōkaidōchū Hizakurige, where the characters, often called Yaji and Kita, frequently find themselves in hilarious situations.

== Characters ==
Junko Yajima (Yaji-san) (矢島 順子, Yajima Junko)
A young woman with shoulder-length black hair. She learned martial arts at her father's dojo. She has a light-hearted personality and sense of humor and can sometimes rush in to a situation without considering the consequences.
Reiko Shinokita (Kita-san) (篠北 礼子, Shinokita Reiko)
A young woman with light brown hair in a bobbed hairstyle. She is an expert at kendo and the sword and is more serious and considered in her actions than Junko.
Tokunari Yukiya (徳成 雪也, Yukiya Tokunari)
Head of the United Kanto Group, has long brown hair and a feminine appearance although he is excellent in both martial arts and diplomacy.
Kotetsu Kakuunsai (各雲斉 小鉄, Kakuunsai Kotetsu)
He works for the United Kanto Group and has long black hair which is usually tied back. He sometimes wears round glasses when he plays an undercover timid student. He is a Kouga ninja and often helps Junko and Reiko on instructions from Tokuzen Yukiya.

== Media ==
=== Manga ===
The manga began serialization in 1982 in Bonita magazine and then in 2003 was transferred to Mystery Bonita magazine, both published by Akita Shoten. It was later compiled into 29 tankōbon volumes.

The manga has been reprinted and collected in multiple editions:

- Yajikita Gakuen Doraka: 29 volumes (1982–1991, Bonita. 2003–2006, Mystery Bonita, Akita Bookstore).
- Yajikita Gakuin dori Shōwa taishi Hatchobori: 1 volume (2010, Princess GOLD, Akita Bookstore).
- Yajikita Gakuen Doraku II: 12 volumes (2010–2015, published by Princess GOLD, Akita Shoten).

=== Anime ===
Tales of Yajikita College was adapted into two OVAs series by J.C.Staff released on September 15, 1989, and July 25, 1991.

==== Episode list ====
No.	Title	Original release date
1	"Phantom Clan Sumeragi"; Transliteration: "Maboroshi no Sumeragi Ichizoku-hen" (Japanese: 幻の皇(すめらぎ)一族編)	September 15, 1989
In a scene from the past, the Sumeragi Clan ere seen chasing one of their own members. In the present, Genzo Murasame, Chairman of the Murasame (Mitsuba) Academy asks Reiko and Junko to investigate incidents at the academy while he is away on business, and they meet the President of the student council, Kikumura, who is suspicious of their presence. That night, while house-sitting Genzo Murasame's home, they come under attack from ninjas after Murasame who they refer to as Tsukikage. The girls are assisted by their ally, Kotetsu, but meanwhile, Junko sees a ghostly image of a young woman. Kotetsu suspects that the ninjas are from the Sumeragi Clan who have a reputation for handling assassinations and financial manipulation. Elsewhere, Murasame receives blackmail money from a corrupt politician for in exchange for providing secret Sumeragi case files. Kotetsu has discovered that a traitor stole the secret files of the Sumeragi Clan causing the leader to committed seppuku, leaving his son Yosuke and daughter, Masako who later died. On his return home, Murasame is attacked by Sumeragi ninja led by Kikumura, who is Yosuke in disguise, and asserts that he is the traitor Tsukikage, but Kotetsu intervenes again to stop the fight. Suddenly, the spirit of Masako appears and causes the book containing the stolen Sumeragi cases to be burned, removing Murasame's source of wealth. Junko explains that the spirit of Masako had been protecting Yosuke, and that there is no longer need for conflict and revenge. Following the incident, the Murasame Academy is closed and the Sumeragi Clan cease operations.
2	"Yearning for Tree Peony"; Transliteration: "Botan Bojou-hen" (Japanese: 牡丹慕情編)	July 25, 1991
Three masked men beat up a young man, and report back to Miss Shirotae Anenokoji that they have taken care of the Chairman's spy as she trims her favorite Fuso Tsukasa peony plant. In a flashback, Shirotae places two Oukadai High School ID booklets before a Jizo Bosatsu shrine and makes a vow, sacrificing some of her hair. Back in the present, Yukiya saves a man whose car's brakes have failed. They discover that he is the board chairman of Oukadai High School, well-known for martial arts and that the car has been sabotaged. Reiko and Junko enroll at Oukadai, and encounter members of the "Fusokai" group bullying a day student. They learn about the "Fate Legend" that says that a "Punisher" will extract vengeance those who cannot do so themselves. Reiko and Junko visit the Jizo Bosatsu shrine where Kotetsu tells them the story of 10 years ago when the leader of the Kendo club, began wreaking havoc, but he was punished and he and his brother were banned from the school. Miss Shirotae is the current leader of the Shadow Military Clan and she asks Reiko and Junko to join her, but they refuse, and are rescued by the arrival of Mr. Nakamura, the maths teacher. At the Martial Arts Hall, Shirotae harshly trains members of the Fusokai group and Reiko suspects that Shirotae become a Yasha (dark spirit) (夜叉 or やしゃ), intent on exposing and defeating the "Punisher" to prepare the way for the one she loves to enter Oukadai. Later, Reiko and Junko realize that Mr. Nakamura is the "Punisher". Shirotae asserts that Reiko is a Marishi-ten, but Shirotae challenges her to a kendo match. As they start, Yukiya arrives with an arm-full of Fuso Tsukasa peonies for Shirotae from Senokimi in Nagano, the man she loves, including a poem asking her to abandon her Fusokai group and instead make the school bloom to atone for the acts of his brother.
