= Kyōhei Ishiguro =

Japanese film & anime director

- イシグロキョウヘイ
- Born: April 2, 1980 (age 46); Hadano, Kanagawa
- Occupation: Anime director
- Years active: 2009–present
- Known for: Your Lie in April
- Spouse: Yukiko Aikei (m. 2013)

Kyōhei Ishiguro (Japanese: イシグロキョウヘイ, Hepburn: Ishiguro Kyōhei; born April 2, 1980) is a Japanese anime director. He debuted in 2009, and after doing the storyboards for three series, he was given the full directorial role in the anime adaptation of Your Lie in April. After directing other television series, he debuted as a film director with Words Bubble Up Like Soda Pop.

== Biography ==
Kyōhei Ishiguro was born in Hadano, Kanagawa on April 2, 1980. After working for Sunrise, he made his directorial debut with the eighth episode of Fairy Tail. He also did storyboarding for Wandering Son, Saki Achiga-hen episode of Side-A, and My Little Monster.

In 2013, Ishiguro married character designer Yukiko Aikei. In 2014, Ishiguro made his full directorial debut with the anime adaptation of Naoshi Arakawa's Your Lie in April., which won the 2016 Sugoi Japan Award in the anime category. Following Your Lie in April's success, Ishiguro directed the anime adaptation of Lance N' Masques. He also later directed the television series adaptations of Occultic;Nine and Children of the Whales.

In 2021, Ishiguro made his debut as a film director with Words Bubble Up Like Soda Pop. It was nominated for the Mainichi Film Award for Best Animation Film in the same year. He also directed the 2021 film Bright: Samurai Soul.

== Works ==
=== TV series ===
- Fairy Tail (2009) (episode 8 director)
- Wandering Son (放浪息子, Hōrō Musuko) (2011) (storyboards)
- Saki Achiga-hen episode of Side-A (咲 Saki 阿知賀編 episode of Side-A) (2012) (storyboards)
- My Little Monster (となりの怪物くん, Tonari no Kaibutsu-kun) (2012) (storyboards)
- Psycho-Pass (2012) (episode 9 director)
- Your Lie in April (四月は君の嘘, Shigatsu wa Kimi no Uso) (2014–2015) (director)
- Lance N' Masques (ランス・アンド・マスクス, Ransu Ando Masukusu) (2015) (director)
- Occultic;Nine (オカルティック・ナイン, Okarutikku Nain) (2016) (director)
- Children of the Whales (クジラの子らは砂上に歌う, Kujira no Kora wa Sajō ni Utau) (2017) (director)

=== Films ===
- Words Bubble Up Like Soda Pop (サイダーのように言葉が湧き上がる, Cider no Yō ni Kotoba ga Wakiagaru) (2021) (director)
- Bright: Samurai Soul (2021) (director)
