= Matsuri Akino =

Japanese manga artist

Matsuri Akino (秋乃 茉莉, Akino Matsuri; born July 7 in Tokyo), is a Japanese manga artist from Mitaka, Tokyo, now a resident of Yokohama.

Her work is a mix of the fantasy, mystery, and horror genres. Her self-portrait is usually a kappa, sometimes with braids or an odango hairstyle.

== Major works ==
=== Reikan Shouhou Kabushikigaisha ===
"Reikan Shouhou Kabushikigaisha" (霊感商法株式会社) was serialized in monthly manga magazine "Apple Mystery" (アップルミステリー) (Oozora Shuppan (宙出版), SHUFU-TO-SEIKATSU SHA(主婦と生活社)). The story first appeared in 1988 in "Horror Party (ホラーパーティー) Vol.1" (SHUFU-TO-SEIKATSU SHA). 15 volumes were originally released, now out of print, but without conclusion. It is currently available in a 10 volume Sonorama Comic Bunko version.

==== Television drama ====
In August 1991, a TV dramatization "Reikan Shouhou Kabushikigaisha - hoshi ni noroi wo - "(霊感商法株式会社～星に呪いを～) was broadcast as part of the TBS TV program "Monday Drama Special" (月曜ドラマスペシャル, Getsuyoubi Dorama Supesharu). Starring Cha Katou (加藤茶, Katou Cha) it consisted of four parts, three of which were loosely based on chapters from the manga.

Episode Titles

- "Rinshitaiken" (臨死体験, Near-death experience)
- "Sotsugyou" (卒業, Graduation)
- "Hoshi ni noroi wo" (星に呪いを, wish on a star)
- "Last Concert" (ラスト・コンサート)

=== Pet Shop of Horrors ===
For details see, Pet Shop of Horrors.

== List of works ==
| Title "romanization" (original Japanese, note) | Release date | Publisher | notes |
|---|---|---|---|
| "Hikari to yami no Legend" (光と闇のレジェンド): "tasogare no machi Epurieru" (黄昏の町エプリエル); "Hikari no Machi Feriru" (光の町フェリル) Vol. 2; "Yami no machi Dimosu" (闇の町ディモス) Vol. 3; "Iseki no machi Faramu" (遺跡の町ファラム) Vol. 4; "RPG Rule hen" (RPGルール編, RPG Rule book) | (July, 1990 - April, 1992) | Oozora Shuppan (宙出版) | RPG replay series, and rule book Illust: Matsuri Akino, By: Bouken Kikakuyoku (冒険企画局, Adventure Planning Service); Out of print |
| "Reikan Shouhou Kabushikigaisha" (霊感商法株式会社) | (August 25, 1990 - December 10, 1996) | Oozora Shuppan | 15 volumes total - out of print re-issue, 10 volumes total (Asahi Sonorama -> Asahi Shimbun) |
| "Pet Shop of Horrors" | (March 10, 1995 - September 10, 1998) | Oozora Shuppan | 10 volumes total - out of print re-issue, 7 volumes total (Asahi Sonorama -> Asahi Shimbun) |
| "Yokohama Alien" (ヨコハマ異邦人) | (September, 1995 - May, 1996) | Kadokawa Shoten | 2 volumes - out of print re-issue, 1 volume (Asahi Sonorama -> Asahi Shimbun) |
| "Oki ni Mesu Mama" (お気に召すまま, As You Like It) | (May, 1997–1998) | Kadokawa Shoten | 3 volumes total re-issue, 1 volume Bunkasha (ぶんか社) |
| "Kamen Tantei" (仮面探偵, Masked Detective) | (January, 1999 - May, 2000) | Akita Shoten | 4 volumes total |
| "Kaze yo, banri wo kakeru yo - Ka Mokuran monogatari" (風よ、万里を翔けよー花木蘭物語) | (July, 1999) | Kadokawa Shoten | original work: Yoshiki Tanaka, Tale of Hua Mulan |
| "Genju no Seiza" (幻獣の星座) | (November 10, 2000 - August 28, 2007) | Akita Shoten | 14 volumes total |
| "Kenja no ishi" (賢者の石, Elixir(Philosopher's stone)): "Zakuro no meikyuu" (柘榴の迷宮) Vol. 1; "Bara yori mo akaku yuki yori mo shiroku" (薔薇よりも赤く雪よりも白く) Vol. 2; "Gothic Anatomia" (ゴシックアナトミア) Vol. 3; "Ophiuchus no keifu" (オフィウクスの系譜) Vol. 4; "sen no yoru no tabibito" (千の夜の旅人) Vol. 5; "rakuen no kizu" (楽園の疵) Vol. 6; "chinmoku no shima" (沈黙の島) Vol. 7; "suijou no meiru" (水上の迷路) Vol. 8; "Death Stalker" (デス・ストーカー) Vol. 9; "Jerusalem" (聖地(エルサレム)) Vol. 10; "kurowashi no keifu" (黒鷲の系譜) Vol. 11; "datenshi no shiro"(堕天使の城) Vol. 12; "Crescent Moon" (二十三夜(クレッセントムーン)) Vol. 13 | (November, 2000 - ) | Bunkasha (ぶんか社) | |
| "Shin Kamen Tantei" (新仮面探偵, New Masked Detective) | (June, 2001) | Akita Shoten | |
| "Shoumaku no nai satsujin" (終幕のない殺人, Murderer without Finale) | (March 20, 2003) | Akita Shoten | original work: Yasuo Uchida (内田康夫, Uchida Yasuo) |
| "Gensou Fantasy" (幻想ファンタジー): "Kinrei yawa" (金鈴夜話) Vol. 5; "Ginrei yawa" (銀鈴夜話) Vol. 6; "Suikyou shou" (水鏡抄) Vol. 7; "Hisui shou" (翡翠抄) Vol. 8; "Seiryuu shou" (青竜抄) Vol. 9; "byakko shuu" (白虎抄) Vol. 10; "suzaku shuu" (朱雀抄) Vol. 11; "genbu shuu" (玄武抄) Vol. 12 | (April 25, 2005 - October 24, 2008) | Shueisha | Anthology, serializes Iten no tsubasa |
| "Vampire Anthology" (バンパイアアンソロジー): "gekka no chinkon-ka-hen"(月下の鎮魂歌編) Vol. 3; "akatsuki no koumori-hen" (暁の蝙蝠編) Vol. 4; "Kanbi naru gishiki-hen" (甘美なる儀式編) Vol. 5 | (August, 2002 - January 20, 2004) | GAKKEN, 学研研究社 | Anthology, serialized Yoru no Kakaku |
| "Nisen-nen me no Propose" (二千年めのプロポーズ, A Man For Megan) | (May 14, 2004) | Oozora Shuppan | original work: Darlene Scalera, American Title: "Three wishes" (Harlequin Ginger Blossom) |
| "Yoru no Kakaku" (夜の過客, Night Exile) | (June 28, 2004 - August 27, 2005) | GAKKEN | 2 volumes re-issue, 1 volume Bunkasha |
| "Sangokushi Anthology bushouranbu" (三国志アンソロジー武将乱舞) | (June 28, 2004) | Futabasha (双葉社) | Anthology, Romance of the Three Kingdoms |
| "Gensou Shokan" (幻想書簡): "sei" (聖); "ka" (架); "rei" (麗); "kai" (戒) | (May 14, 2004 - January 28, 2005) | GAKKEN | Anthology, serialized Yoru no Kakaku |
| "Shin Petshop of Horrors" (新Petshop of Horrors) | (January 30, 2005 - December 2012) | Asahi Sonorama -> Asahi Shimbun | 12 volumes, completed |
| "Meitantei Nekomaru-Senpai no Jikenbo" (名探偵猫丸先輩の事件簿) Vol. 1 | (February 25, 2005) | Akita Shoten | Anthology, original work: Jun Kurachi (倉知淳, Kurachi Jun) |
| "Meitantei Asami Mitsuhiko, ryojou Mystery" (名探偵浅見光彦 旅情ミステリー) Vol. 3 & 4 | (October, 2005 - February, 2006) | Akita Shoten | Original work: Yasuo Uchida |
| "Black Jack M Vol. 1"(ブラック・ジャックM) | (December 9, 2005) | Akita Shoten | Anthology, original work: Osamu Tezuka |
| "Kurayami no Fantasy" (暗闇のファンタジー, Twilight Phantasies) | (January 14, 2006) | Oozora Shuppan | Original work: Maggie Shayne, two volumes. |
| "Maboroshi no Hana, Yoi no Tsuki" (幻華宵月) | (September 22, 2006) | Asahi Sonorama | Illustration Collection |
| "Maid in Wonderland"(メイドインワンダーランド) | (February 23, 2007) | Asahi Sonorama | Anthology |
| "Mugen Anthology" (夢幻アンソロジー) Vol 5. - 26: "Gensou Sokkyoukyoku" (幻想即興曲, Fantasy Impromptu) Vol. 5; "Gensou Kumikyoku"(幻想組曲, Fantasy Suite) Vol. 6; "Gensou Sayokyoku" (幻想小夜曲, Fantasy Serenade) Vol. 7; "Gensou Yasoukyoku" (幻想夜想曲, Fantasy Nocturne) Vol. 8; "Gensou Hensoukyoku" (幻想変奏曲, Fantasy Variation) Vol. 9; etc. | (March, 2007 - ) | Shoudensha (祥伝社) | anthology, serialized "Chihiro ni sakuhana"(千尋に咲く花), "kadafuraiden" (華佗風来伝), and "meikuro no kanon" (冥黒の奏音) |
| "Iten no Tsubasa" (倚天の翼) | (April 30, 2007 - May 25, 2009) | Shueisha | 2 volumes |
| "Mike-neko Holmes no bouken" (三毛猫ホームズの冒険, The Adventures of Mikeneko HOLMES) Vol. 2 | (July, 2007) | Akita Shoten | Original work: Jirō Akagawa |
| "Uchida Yasuo, Asami Mitsuhiko Mystery & ryojou Suspense" (内田康夫 浅見光彦ミステリー&旅情サスペンス) Vol. 3 | (July, 2007) | Akita Shoten | Original work: Yasuo Uchida |
| "Kaitou Alexandrite"(怪盗アレキサンドライト, Alexandrite mysterieux de voleur) | (August 9, 2007 - August 16, 2011) | Bunkasha | 8 volumes |
| "Chihiro ni sakuhana" (千尋に咲く花) | (May, 2008 - May 25, 2009) | Shoudensha | 2 volumes |
| "Kada furaiden" (華佗風来伝) | (June 8, 2010 - April 8, 2011) | Shoudensha | 2 volumes |
| "Hare, tokidoki raijin" (晴れ、ときどき雷神) | (October 15, 2010 - June 15, 2012) | Akita Shoten | 3 volumes |
| "Kugutsu hanayuugi ~Chinese Coppelia" (傀儡華遊戯~チャイニーズ・コッペリア) | (March 17, 2012 - ) | Bunkasha | 4 volumes |
| "Meikoku no kanon" (冥黒の奏音) | (June 8, 2012 - ) | Shoudensha | 2 volume |
| "Tsukiakirakani hoshimarenari" (月明らかに星稀なり) | (September 25, 2012) | Shueisha | 1 volume |
| "Colorful Crow" (カラフル・クロウ) | (March 15, 2013 - ) | Akita Shoten | 1 volume |
| "Petshop of Horrors Passage-ron" (Petshop of Horrors パサージュ編) | (August 23, 2013 - ) | Mugentou Comics (夢幻燈コミックス), an imprint of Harlequin (ハーレクイン) | 5 volumes |
| "Petshop of Horrors Ark Adrift" (Petshop of Horrors 漂泊の箱舟編) | (December 27, 2018 - ) | Mugentou Comics (夢幻燈コミックス), an imprint of Harlequin (ハーレクイン) | 3 volumes |

- Magazines are not listed.

== See also ==
- Pet Shop of Horrors
- Genju no seiza
- Kamen Tantei
- Japanese television drama
