= Genju no Seiza =

Japanese manga series

- Cover of the first volume

幻獣の星座 (Genjū no Seiza)
- Genre: Supernatural, comedy, fantasy
- Manga
- Written by: Matsuri Akino
- Published by: Akita Shoten
- English publisher: US: Tokyopop
- Magazine: Suspiria Mystery
- Original run: 2000 – 2007
- Volumes: 14

Genju no Seiza (幻獣の星座, Genjū no Seiza; lit. Constellation of the Imaginary Beast) is a Japanese supernatural manga created by Matsuri Akino. The series is focused on Kamishina Fuuto, a teenager who has spiritual senses, and his struggle to maintain a normal life while being a reincarnation of the High Priest of Darashaal.

The manga is published by Akita Shoten in 14 graphic novels. It was licensed and distributed in the United States by Tokyopop, but it seems that the project has been discontinued.

== Premise ==
In the distant country of Darashaal, they have found their leader of fifteen years of age. He is the 42nd High Priest of Darashaal, and is supposed to be a reincarnation of the first spiritual leader. But he isn't. The high priest is actually an impostor appointed by the Chinese government and the Dragon god Nāga so the Chinese can claim the scared country. The real ruler is in Japan.

Kamishina Fuuto is a normal teenager who recently transferred schools. He can sense people's auras and hence sees the personality of the students. While lying on the lawn a large bird tries to approach him. It transforms into a half-man half-bird hybrid named Garuda. He claims that Fuuto is the true heir to the throne of Darashaal.

Throughout the story, though Fuuto refuses to take on his role as the Holy King, he learns almost the same lessons as the King should have. In his experiences with more Guardian Beasts and the Supernatural world, he grows to learn of mortality, and the roads people make for themselves and others.

== Main characters ==
Fuuto Kamishina
Son of a world famous photographer living in Japan, Fuuto grew up loving his single mother and resenting his father for leaving the family. As a boy with strange powers which only increase over time, he is revealed to be the heir to the throne of Darashaal, a title and role he refuses to take.
Mayu
A young girl who uses a wheelchair and living in a castle with Prof Ichigo, she often appears to be either emotionless or angry. Mayu is able to see the guardian beasts and other spirits for who they are, sometimes she is the only one to sense something wrong.
Garuda
The first guardian beast who discovers Fuuto's heritage. To those without special powers he appears to be a large bird, but a select few sees him as a man with a bird's head and wings.
Hanuman
The first assassin sent by Naga to kill the "Impostor King", Hanuman appears to be a small monkey with a childish air. After swearing loyalty to Fuuto, his role takes up most of the childish humor of the story. He appears to adore Sohki, much to Genro's chagrin.
Genro
A general wolf god who gets irritated whenever someone calls him a dog, Genro was sent by Naga to check on Hanuman's progress and to slay the Impostor King should the monkey fail. Unlike Hanuman, Genro is extremely cautious around Sohki and often freaks when the latter gets too close to him.
Ohko
This tiger assassin was extremely loyal to Atisha, but he decides to watch Fuuto for a while.

=== Darashaal's people ===
Naga
The dragon god who appointed the current king to the throne, he is described to be the rival of Garuda.
Atisha
The current king of Darashaal, he is often seen meditating in a locked, dark room. Fuuto's age, but almost his complete opposite in personality as he is humble and quiet.
Sohki
The Kirin, who is supposedly the only beast not under the command or control of the Holy King and his subjects. He is blind and deaf, but can read thoughts. Sohki often teases and mocks anyone he meets, but when serious he is said to be able to easily destroy Japan.
Lamia
The snake guardian beast, in ancient Greece and the orient, she was feared as a succubus, and is very clever and tenacious. Lamia was the first female assassin sent by Naga to slay the 'impostor king'.
Yamantaka
Third assassin sent by Naga after Genro and Hanuman were 'brainwashed by the false king', he is a minotaur who confronts Fuuto when the boy is on a school field trip without his guardians.

=== Humans ===
Kimihiko Ichigo
The guardian of Mayu, this 32-year-old man is a graduate of Meio Academy and a multi-field scholar from an ancient Kyoto family. He is very interested in the supernatural, even though he has no sixth sense himself.
Tserin
Fuuto's mother, originally from a nomadic tribe in Tibet. Though kind and gentle, she is in a constant state of anxiety both due to Fuuto's strange powers and the fear of being discovered by Kento's mother, whom she mistakenly thought would try to deport her.
Kento Kamishina
Fuuto's father, a world famous photographer, and currently missing. He disliked his family business and at 18 left so that he could pursue his hobby of taking photos. A constant traveller, he met Tserin while travelling in Tibet, and eventually married her.
Takako Kamishina
Kento's mother, Fuuto's grandmother, and the godmother of a yakuza family. She is a dignified and may appear to be a fierce figure, but her love for Kento and Fuuto is true.
Seishun Abeno
A friend of Fuuto's and descendant of Abe no Seimei, he is heir of the divinatory family in Kyoto. He has an inferiority complex due to his lack of occult power. He may appear to be a fragile and rich boy, but is extremely intelligent and can easily adjust to new situations.
Abe no Kagari
Granddaughter of Abe no Seimei who looks exactly like Mayu, but is stubborn and full of curiosity.

== Release ==
=== Volume list ===
| No. | Original release date | Original ISBN | North American release date | North American ISBN |
|---|---|---|---|---|
| 01 | — | 978-4253129534 | August 8, 2006 | 978-1-59816-607-1 |
| 02 | — | 978-4253129541 | December 12, 2006 | 978-1-59816-608-8 |
| 03 | — | 978-4253129558 | April 10, 2007 | 978-1-59816-609-5 |
| 04 | — | 978-4253129565 | August 7, 2007 | 978-1-59816-610-1 |
| 05 | — | 978-4253129572 | December 11, 2007 | 978-1-59816-611-8 |
| 06 | — | 978-4253129589 | April 8, 2008 | 978-1-59816-612-5 |
| 07 | — | 978-4253129596 | August 12, 2008 | 978-1-59816-613-2 |
| 08 | — | 978-4253129602 | August 3, 2010 | 978-1-59816-614-9 |
| 09 | — | 978-4253129619 | | |
| 10 | — | 978-4253129626 | | |
| 11 | — | 978-4253129633 | | |
| 12 | — | 978-4253129640 | | |
| 13 | — | 978-4253129756 | | |
| 14 | — | 978-4253129763 | | |

== Reception ==
Pop Culture Shock admired Genju's "beautiful artwork" and "appealing characters," as well as the costume design, which used period-accurate detail from Japan's Taisho era.
