= Hideji Oda =

Japanese manga artist

Hideji Oda (小田ひで次, Oda Hideji; born 1962 in Iwate Prefecture, Japan) is a Japanese manga artist.

== Career ==
Oda attended a design school for three years and then submitted his work to the manga magazine Monthly Afternoon. He won the Afternoon Shiki Shō, the newcomers award of the magazine, and published his first work as a professional manga artist in 1992 with the first chapter of the series Kakusan, which he published in Afternoon afterwards.

His work has been associated with the Nouvelle manga movement. His book A Patch of Dreams has been translated into English by Fanfare/Ponent Mon.

His manga Miyori no Mori has been adapted into an anime television film.

== Works ==
- Kakusan ("A Diffusion Disease", 2 volumes, Kodansha, Monthly Afternoon, 1992–1998)
- Coo's World (2 volumes, Kodansha, Monthly Afternoon, 1999–2000)
- Miyori no Mori (1 volume, Akita Shoten, 2004)
- A Patch of Dreams (1 volume, Asuka Shinsha, 2005 - sequel to Coo's World)
- Miyori no Mori no Shiki (2 volumes, Akita Shoten, 2007–2008)
- Zoku Miyori no Mori no Shiki (Akita Shoten, 2008)
